= Education in Sambalpur =

Sambalpur is a city in Sambalpur district in the Indian state of Odisha. It lies at a distance of 321 km from the state capital Bhubaneswar. In the year 1876, Sambalpur was established as a municipality. It is currently the headquarters and the largest city of Sambalpur district. It is also the commercial capital of Western Odisha. Sambalpur is famous for Hirakud Dam, Sambalpuri Saree, Sambalpuri songs, Sambalpuri dance, the Sitalsasthi Carnival, The Leaning Temple of Huma and Gandhi temple.

Sambalpur University

== List of educational organizations in Sambalpur ==
=== Universities and autonomous institutes ===
- Indian Institute of Management Sambalpur
- Odisha State Open University
- Sambalpur University
- Veer Surendra Sai University of Technology
- Sambalpur University Institute of Information Technology
- Gangadhar Meher University
- Veer Surendra Sai Institute of Medical Sciences and Research

=== Colleges ===
- Netaji Subash Chandra Bose College
- Government Women's College
- Lajpat Rai Law College, Sambalpur
- Hirakud College, Hirakud
- Orissa Medical College of Homeopathy & Research, Sambalpur
- Burla College, Burla
- Govt College Of Physical Education, Sambalpur
- Sambalpur Nursing College, Dhanupali
- Dr Parshuram Mishra Institute of Advanced Studies in Education, Sambalpur
- Silicon Institute of Technology, Sambalpur
