= Ghanteswari Temple =

Hindu Temple in Odisha, India

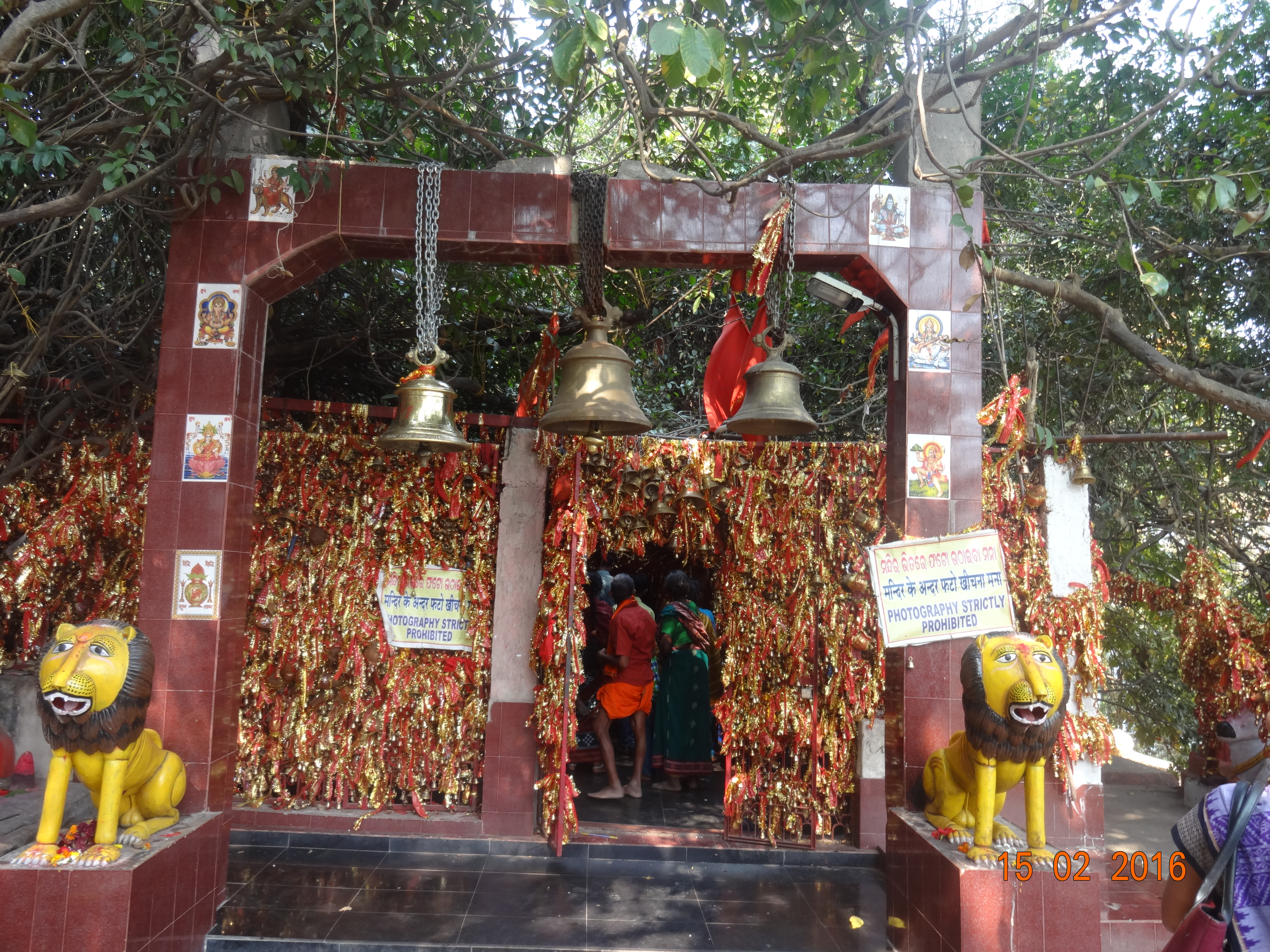
Ghanteswari Temple

Maa Ghanteshwari temple is a temple in Chiplima in Odisha, India.

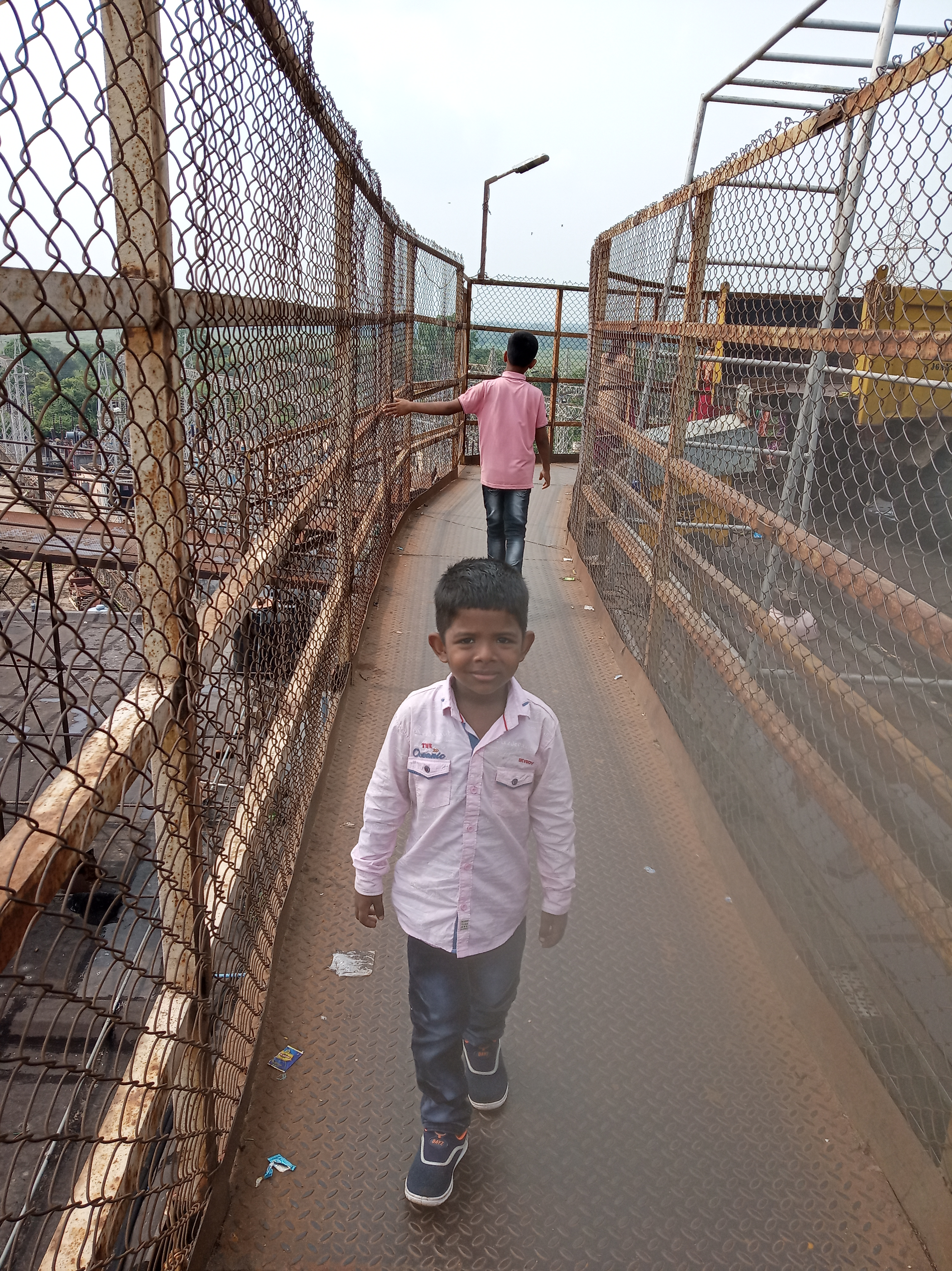

As the name suggests there are bells everywhere.

Maa Ghanteshwari Temple is situated 33 kilometres (21 mi) southwest of the district capital Sambalpur on the bank of Mahanadi River. The Chipilima Hydro Powerplant (CHEP) is located near the temple on the same river bank.

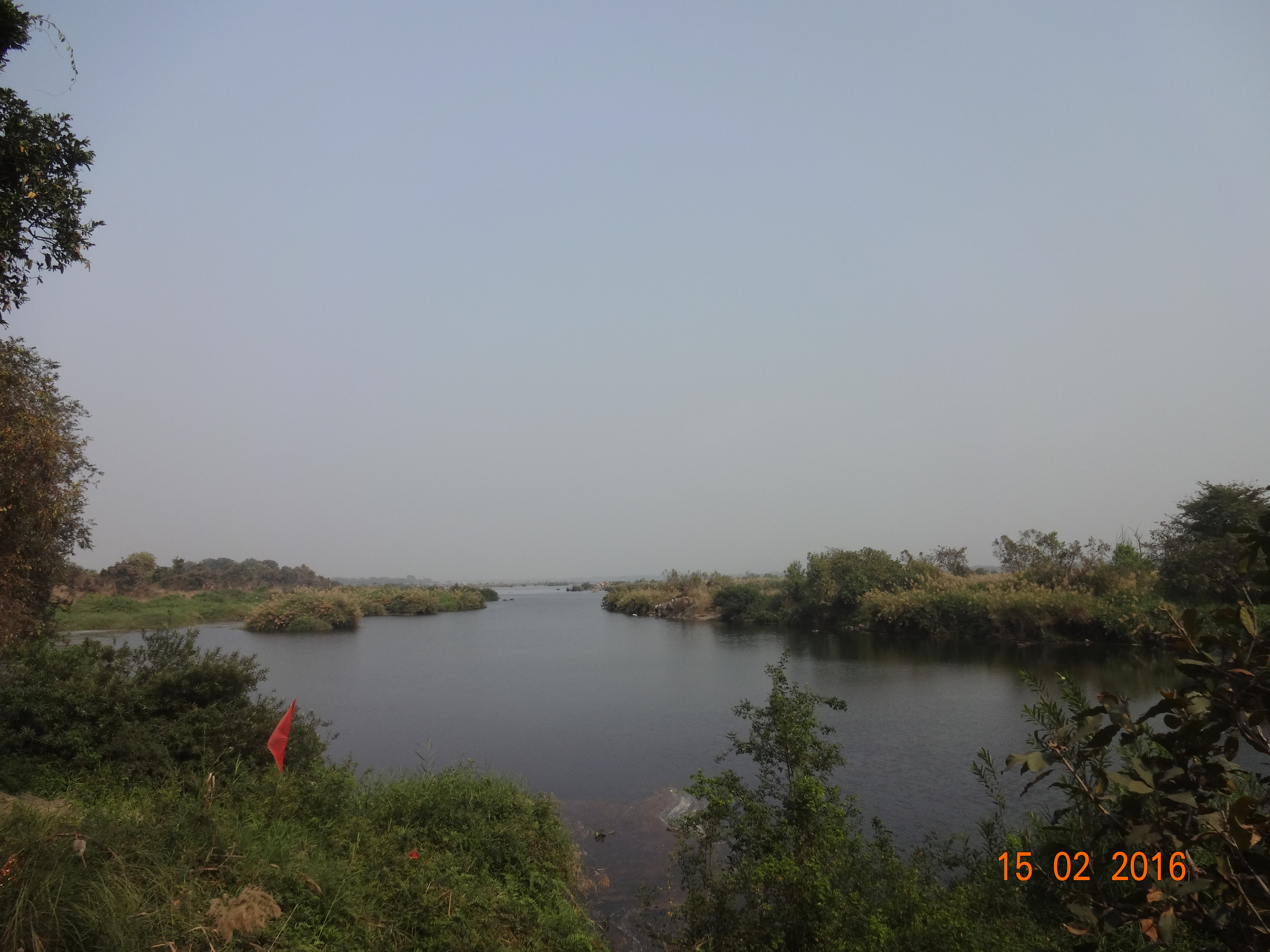
Natural Scenery near Ghanteswari

== See also ==
- List of Hindu temples in India
