= Gangadhar Meher =

Indian (Odia-language) poet born in Utkala (1862-1924)

Swabhav Kabi Gangadhara Meher
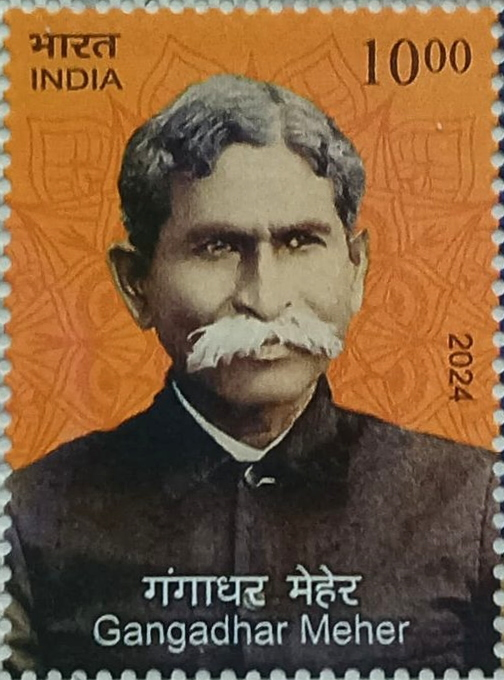
- Gangadhara Meher on a 2024 stamp of India
- Born: 9 August 1862; Barpali, Bargarh, Odisha, India
- Died: 4 April 1924 (aged 61)
- Education: Std V
- Occupation: Judicial Moharir (Accountant)
- Known for: Odia poet
- Notable work: Tapaswini; Rasa-Ratnakara; Balarama-deba; Pranaya Ballari; Kichaka Badha; Indumati; Ayodhya Drusya; Padmini
- Spouse(s): Shanta Devi; Champa Devi (after the death of Shanta Devi)
- Children: Arjuna Meher; Bhagaban Meher; Basumati Meher; Lakhmi Meher
- Parents: Chaitanya Meher (father); Sevati Devi (mother)
- Website: www.gangadharmeher.org

Swabhaba kabi Gangadhar Meher Tanti was an Odia poet of the 19th century. He is one of the most prolific and original contributor to Odia literature.

== Childhood ==
Gangadhara was born in an Odia Bhulia family on 1862 on the full moon day of Shravana Purnima at Barpali of present-day Bargarh district of Odisha. Chaitanya Meher was working as a village Vaidya (Ayurvedic doctor) besides his family profession of weaving. But as he could not maintain his family with the income of these works, he opened a village school and began to teach a few children. Gangadhara Meher could read up to the Middle Vernacular Standard hurdling over diverse disadvantages, and his keen eagerness for literature eventually sparked his skills in writing poems.

As a young boy, he heard the Jagamohana Ramayana composed by Balarama Dasa and afterwards he himself read it as well as the Odia Mahabharata by Sarala Dasa. He also read and mastered a great number of Sanskrit books; of which 'Raghuvamsham', deserve mention. Tulasi Ramayana in Awadhi used to be held by him in great respect. He used to read Bengali magazines and newspapers.

Gangadhara got married at the age of 10. As his father's pecuniary condition was not satisfactory, Gangadhar used to go to school in the morning and help his father in weaving in the afternoon. His clear and beautiful hand writing also garnered attention from many people willing to get their transcribed by him. The pecuniary condition of the family improved a bit due to his hard labour when to the misfortune of the family, the ancestral house caught fire.

== Career ==
The then Zamindar of Barpali, Lal Nruparaj Singh offered him the post of an Amin (Patwari). Coming to learn of amicable behaviours and good virtues of Gangadhara, the Zamindar promoted him to the post of a Moharir. He continued to serve in the said post and was transferred to Sambalpur, Bijepur and Padmapur and at last transferred to him own native place Barapali on a salary of Rs. 30/- per month.

The poet was very liberal and progressive socially. During the last age of his life, the poet organized an All Odisha Social Conference of Mehers with a view to uplifting the entire weaver society. Nearly three thousand Mehers from different parts of Odisha assembled in the Conference. The poet put up twelve proposals for the reform of the society and all were passed unanimously.

== Literary career ==
Gangadhara started composing poems from a very young age. His first writings follow the style and technique of the ancient Odia writers. His first kabya (poetic work) was "Rasa-Ratnakara". Then being persuaded by some friends he changed his ways and wrote poems and kabyas in the modern Odia style. Kabibara Radhanatha Ray praised his writing very much. The works produced by Gangadhara Meher are marked by vivid imagination, in beauty and clarity of language, in the novelty of style, in point of forceful character painting and in the lively description of nature from different perspectives. His writings remain as some of greatest creations in Odia literature. His literary career was frequently influenced by the writings of Radhanath Rai, who wrote in western influences. A research was conducted in North orissa University which reveals many similarities between Gangadhar Meher and western romantic poets like P.B Shelley, Lord Byron, John Keats.The treatment of nature is equally same in their poetries.

== Legacy ==
In 1949, Sambalpur College which is in Sambalpur district, opened in 1944 was renamed Gangadhar Meher College in his honour later upgraded to a university, now it is known by Gangadhar Meher University. In 2015, this college was upgraded to a university. Sambalpur University, Burla, instituted the Gangadhar Meher National Award for Poetry which is conferred annually on the foundation day of Sambalpur University. In January 2020 the Gangadhar Meher National award will be conferred to Viswanath Prasad Tiwari.

== See also ==
- List of Indian poets
- Odia literature
- Odia language
