= Budharaja =

Indian town

Coordinates: 21.484476°N 83.979280°E

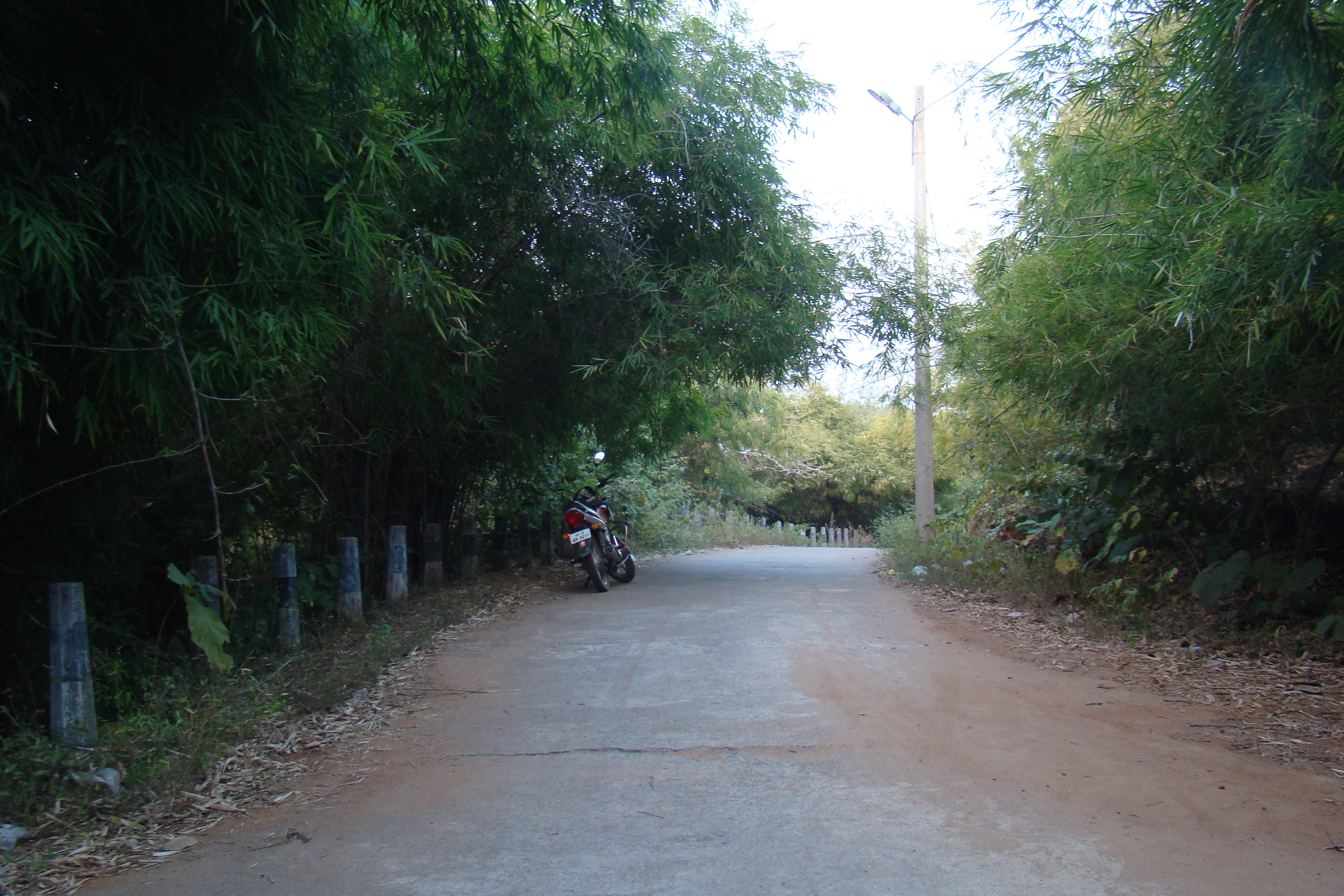
The road leading to Siva temple

Budharaja is a small hillock in Sambalpur, Odisha, India. There is a Shiva temple situated on the top of hill and middle of the sambalpur city. A concrete road goes to the temple from the base. The locality on the eastern side of the hillock is known as Budharaja due to its proximity to the hillock. Currently a Watch Tower is under construction to increase tourism.

== Gallery ==
View of SBP from NH 6

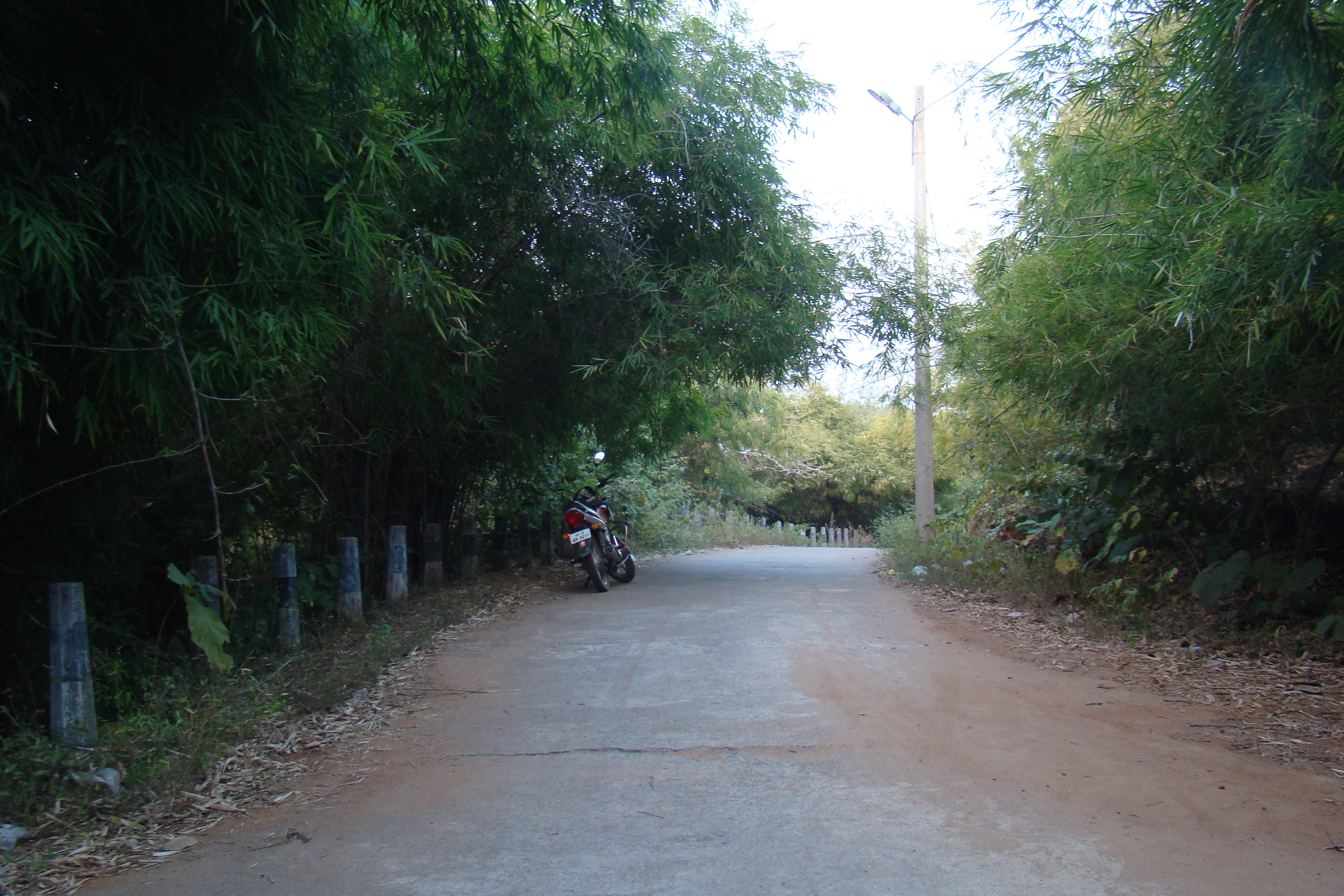
Road to Budharaja Hill-top

View from Budharaja Hill, Hindalco factory at far view

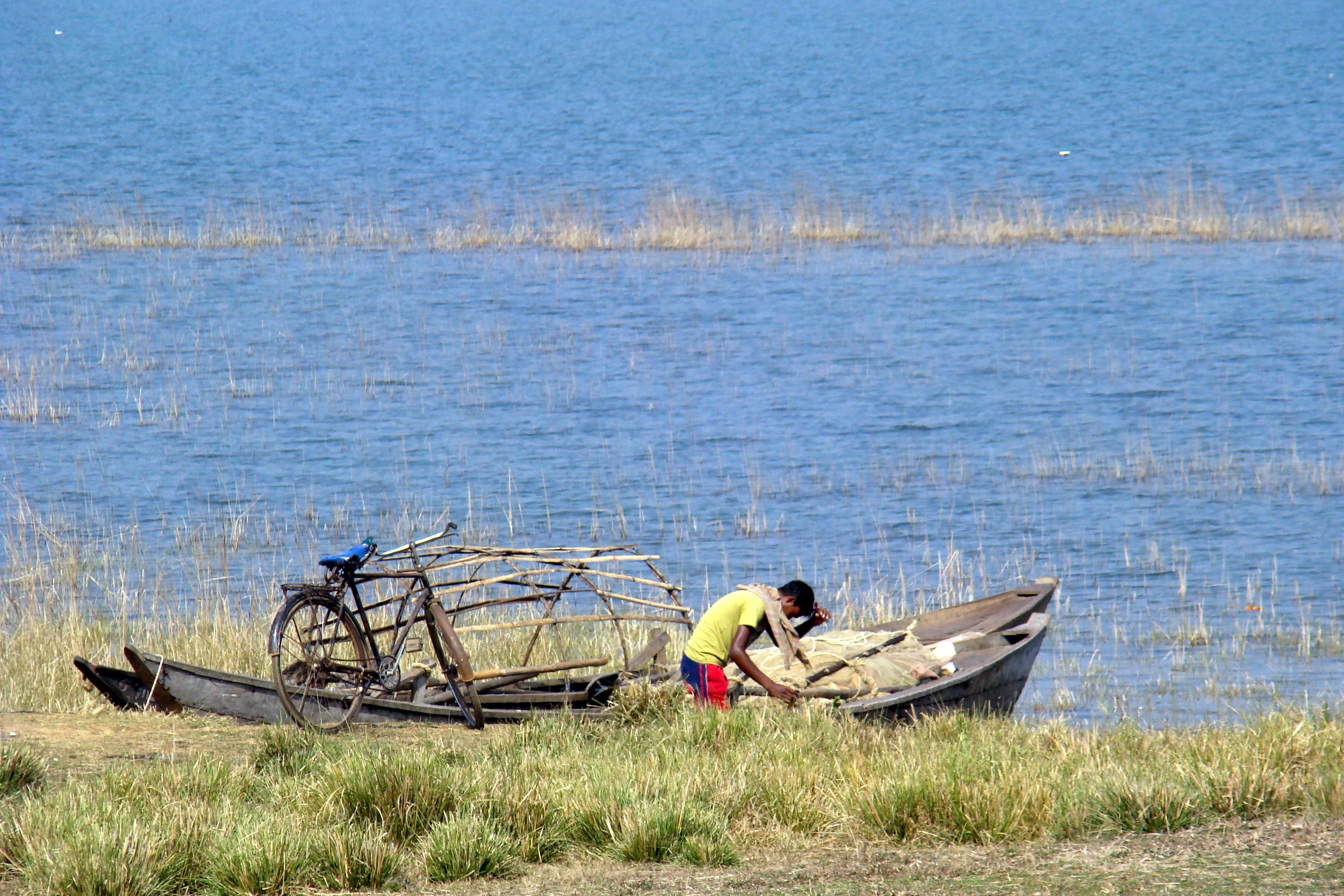
Fisherman at work in Hirakud Dam

Morning Sky at SBP

- References
