= Zilla School, Sambalpur =

Coordinates: 21.4629°N 83.9801°E

Chandra Sekhar Behera Zilla School
- Sambalpur Zilla School
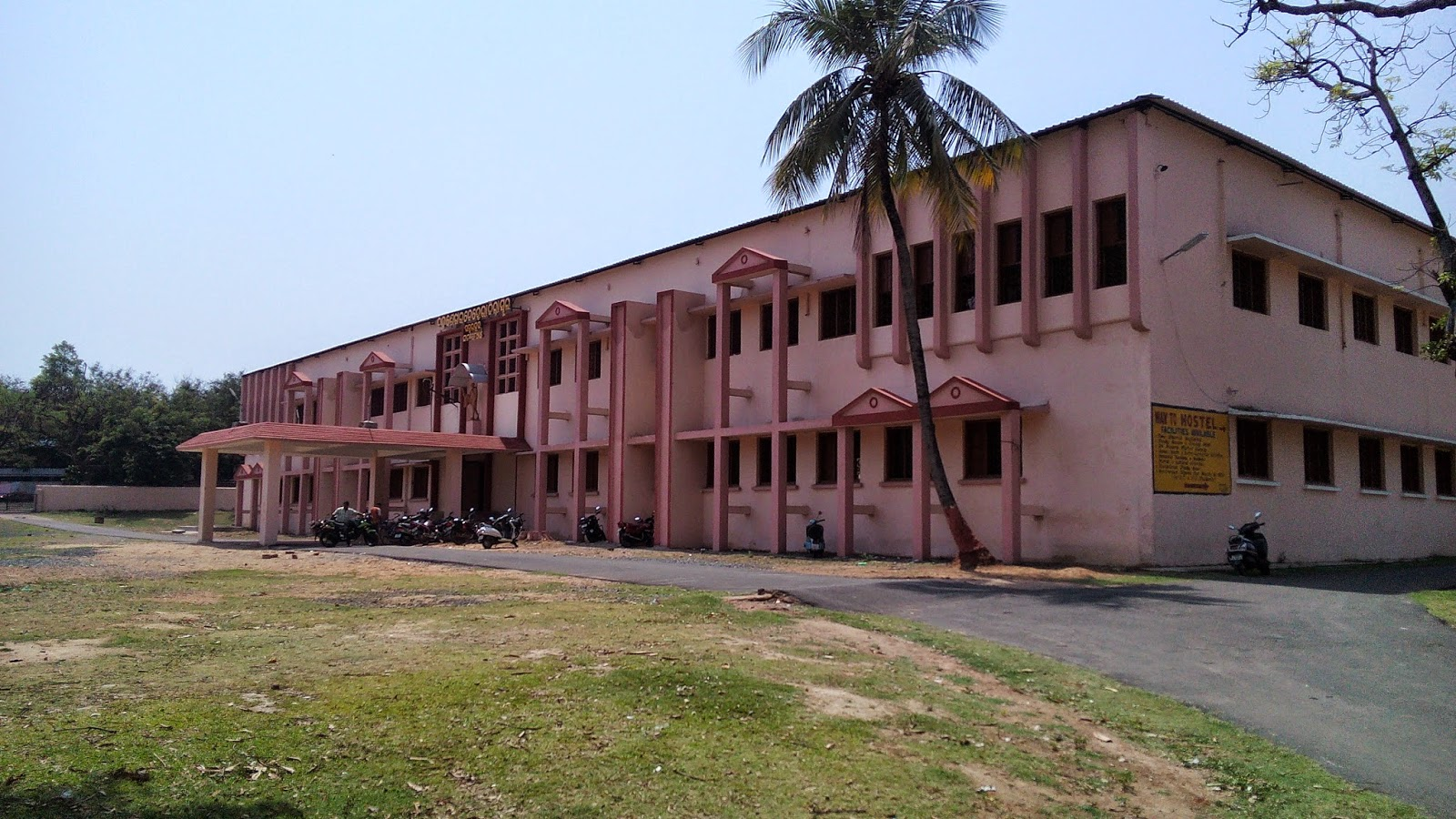
- CSB Zilla School
- India; Sambalpur, Odisha

Information
- School type: High School
- Established: 1852
- Authority: Department of Schools and Mass Education, Odisha
- Classes offered: From Class 6 to 10
- Language: ODIA
- Nickname: CSBZS

Chandra Sekhar Behera Zilla School is a government educational institution providing education at the high school level in Sambalpur, Odisha. Subjects taught include the Mathematics, General science, Social Sciences, Physical Sciences, Electronics, Retail, Odia, English, Parsi, Urdu etc The main objective of this institution is to disseminate knowledge to the students in different fields. Simultaneously this institution also aims at the overall development of the students' physical, mental, and moral capacities. Games and Sports are also an integral part of this institution which inspires the students to be physically fit. There are also many societies and associations related to social service and cultural programmes. N.C.C., Rovers and Rangers (a Scouting organization), and the Red Cross to build enthusiasm and a feeling of national integration in the students.

In 1852, the Anglo-Vernacular School was set up at Sambalpur. It was housed in a building (with stone-and-mud walls and stone-and-lime floor) constructed near the Raja-Palace Rajabakhri: That site now houses the Lady Lewis Girls' High School. Eventually, out of the Anglo-Vernacular School, the Zilla School emerged in 1864. In the year 1952, the school was renamed as Chandra Sekhar Behera Zilla School, to commemorate the contributions of a renowned socio-cultural savant and freedom-fighter : Chandra Sekhar Behera (1873–1936). The School moved into its new building in 1954. In 2017, a statue of A. P. J. Abdul Kalam was erected in the school premises.

== Timeline of CSB High school ==
- 1850—On 30 April opened by John Cadenhead, first Principal Assistant as Sambalpur Public School at old Raj Darbar of Sambalpur palace with 7 students
- 1851—on 17 November, when the student strength rose to 60, Cadenhead died on this day.
- 1852—Govt. took over the school, it became government school and the name was changed to Sambalpur School.
- 1864—British Govt. decided to have one Zilla School at each District HQ. Hence Sambalpur School became Zilla School.
- 1868—Dharanidhar Mishra of Sambalpur became the first matriculate who appeared entrance at Calcutta.
- 1876—Demand to open Entrance class was submitted before education committee by Trilochan Supakar alias Brahma.
- 1882—name got changed as Morris School by the name of Sir J.H.Morris, chief commissioner, C.P.
- 1885—Permission granted to have an entrance at Sambalpur.
- 1886—from 6 students of Morris School 3 selected to appear entrance at Balasore center, two Madhusudan Mishra and Madan Mohan Pujari became a success.
- 1890—Morris School again became Zilla School.
- 1895—Money was sanctioned to build a new school building as Darbar Hall was in a dilapidated condition.
- 1897—Baikunthanath Pujari who was the first B.A of Sambalpur became the first-ever M.A also who passed from Presidency College, Calcutta.
- 1927—on 3 January Zilla School was shifted to a newly built building near Road Railway Station. Girls M.E school got established at the old Zilla School building.
- 1942—because of Bombing near Kujang by the Japanese in 2nd world war State Secretariat was shifted to Sambalpur and started working at Zilla school. A thatched roofed house got constructed nearby to run Zilla school.
- 1944—this year Secretariat got shifted to Cuttack. On 7 July Sambalpur College was started at the original Zilla school building. The Girl's M.E. school which was running at the old Zilla School building near Raja Bakhri was elevated to be a girl's high school, named after Alice Margaret Rose Lewis, the lady of Sir Hawthorne Lewis, Governor of Odisha, who opened both the college and the Girls High School.
- 1952—Zilla School got the name as Chandrasekhar Zilla School.
- 1954—on 1 July, Zilla school was shifted near Circuit house hill, where it is presently having.
- 1966—on 9 and 10 October Centenary functions of the school was celebrated.
- 1974—Because of the negligence of knowledge about this region, many in coastal Odisha thought that Sambalpur school was named after Samanta Chandrasekhara. So the name at Sambalpur school was again got changed to Chandrasekhar Behera Zilla School. Chandrasekhar Behera is the first Advocate, first elected Municipality Chairman, who is the first to propose the establishment of Congress in Odisha.
