= National Highway 42 (India, old numbering) =

Highway in Odisha, India

National Highway 42

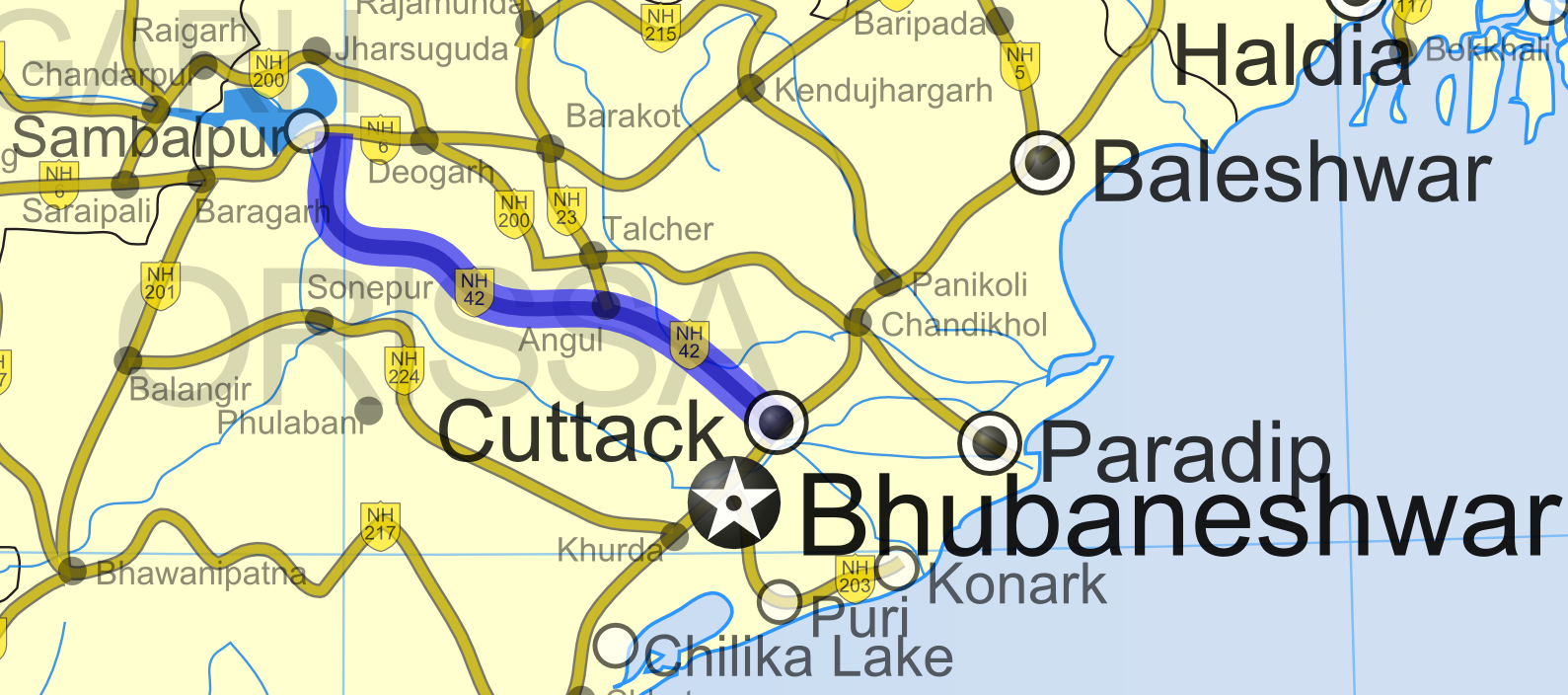

Route information
- Length: 261 km (162 mi)

Major junctions
- East end: NH 6 Northeast of Cuttack, Odisha
- West end: Sambalpur, Odisha

Location
- Country: India
- States: Odisha
- Primary destinations: Cuttack - Dhenkanal - Angul - Sambalpur

Highway system
- Roads in India; Expressways; National; State; Asian
← NH 41	→ NH 43

National Highway 42 (or NH 42) is a National Highway of India entirely within the state of Odisha. It links NH 5 northeast of the city of Cuttack with NH 6 in Sambalpur. NH 6 runs for a total length of 261 km (162 mi).

== See also ==
- List of National Highways in India by highway number
- National Highways Development Project
