= Sambalpur =

Sambalpur Sambalpore
- City
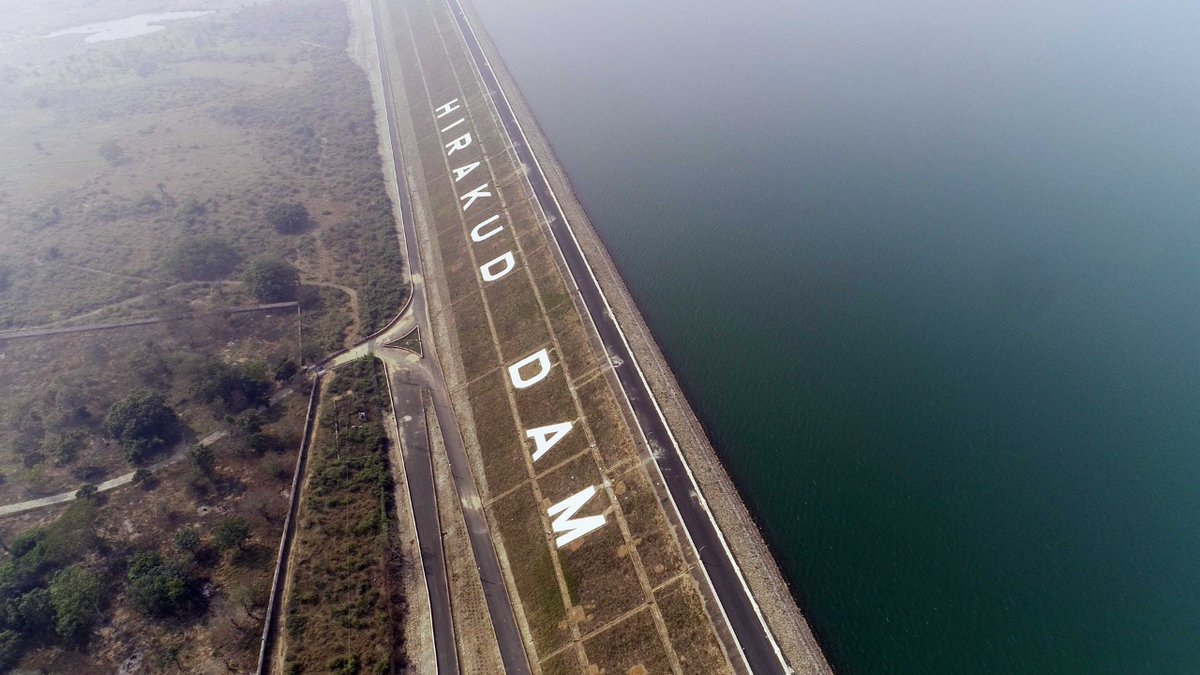
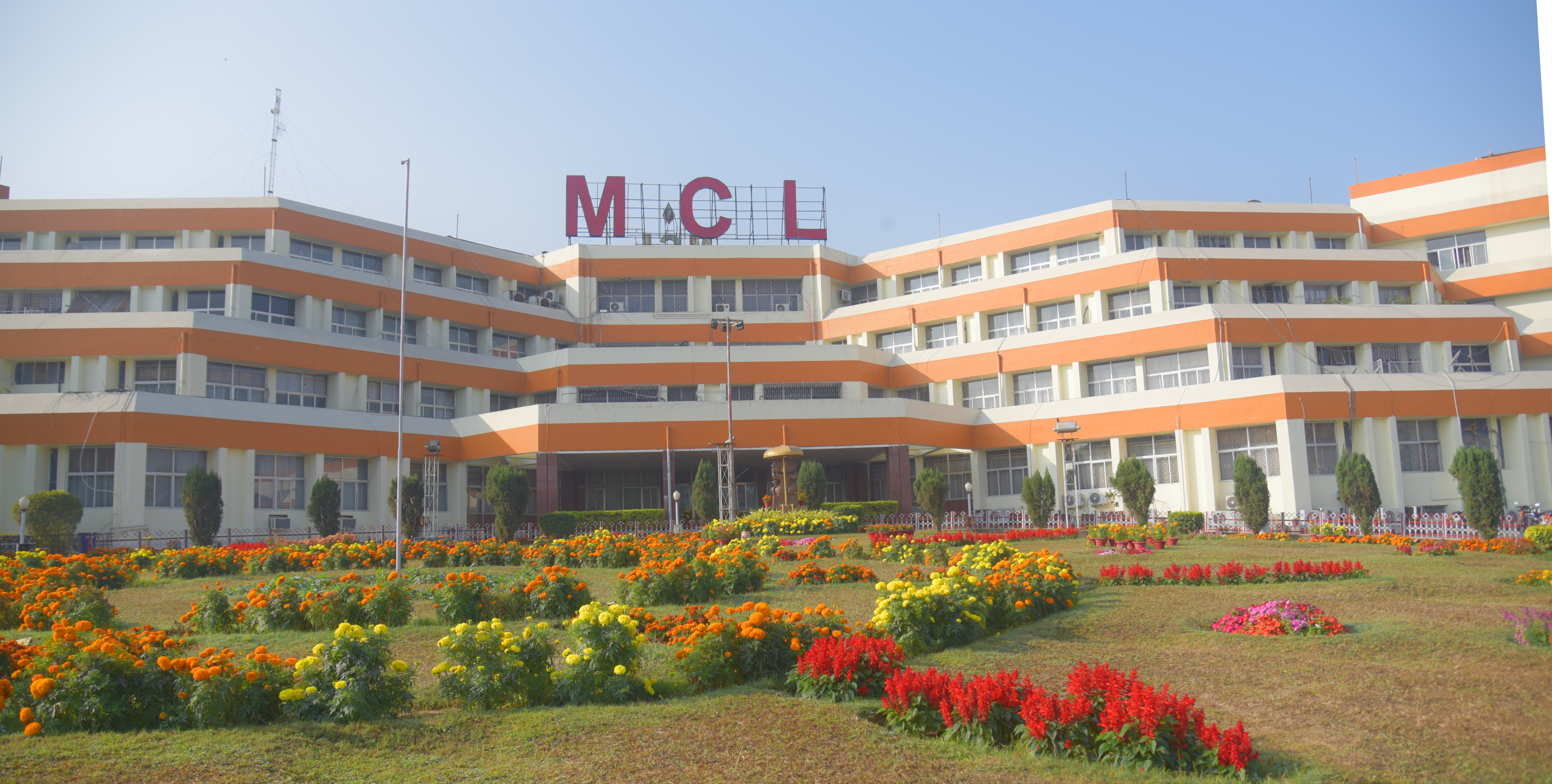
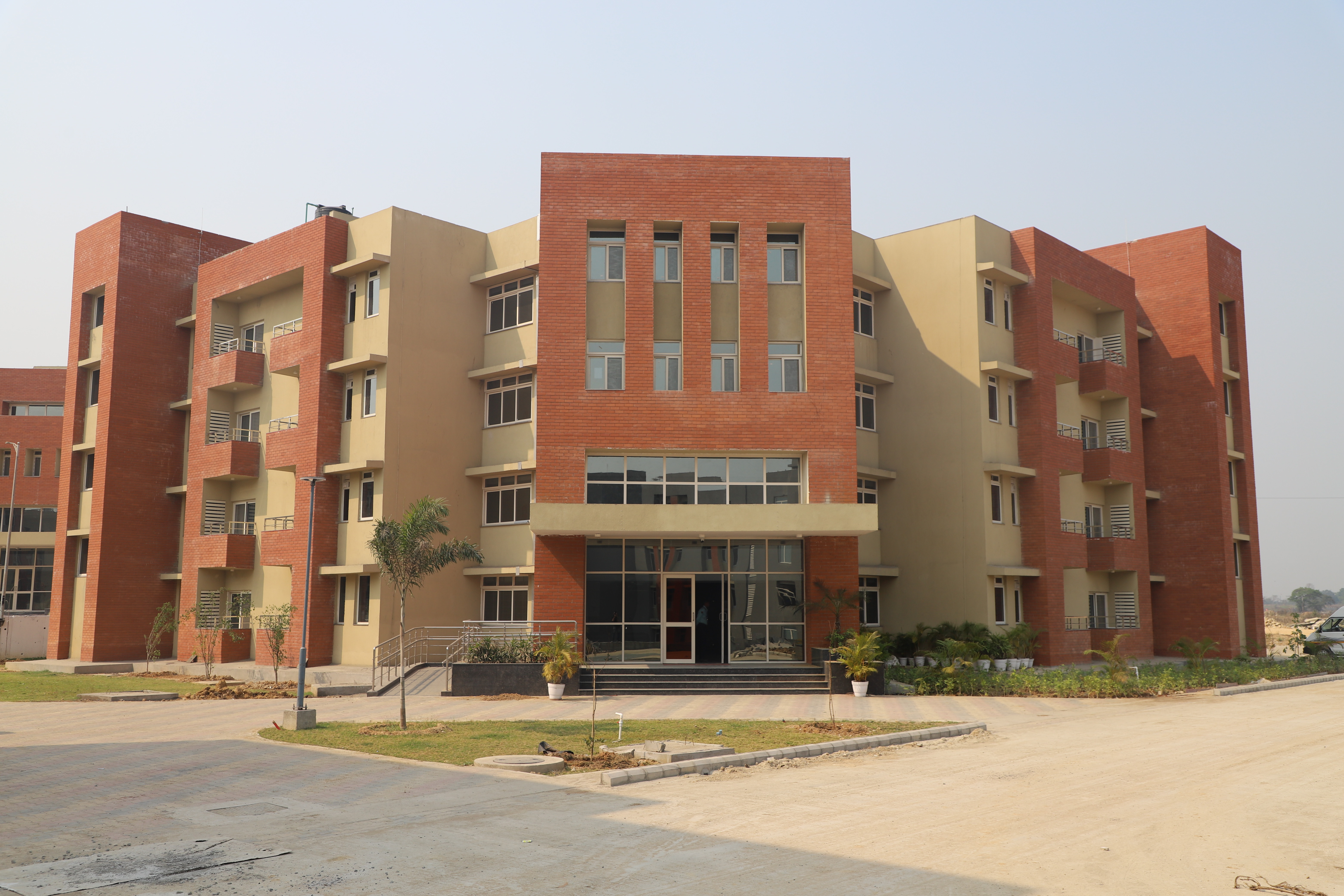
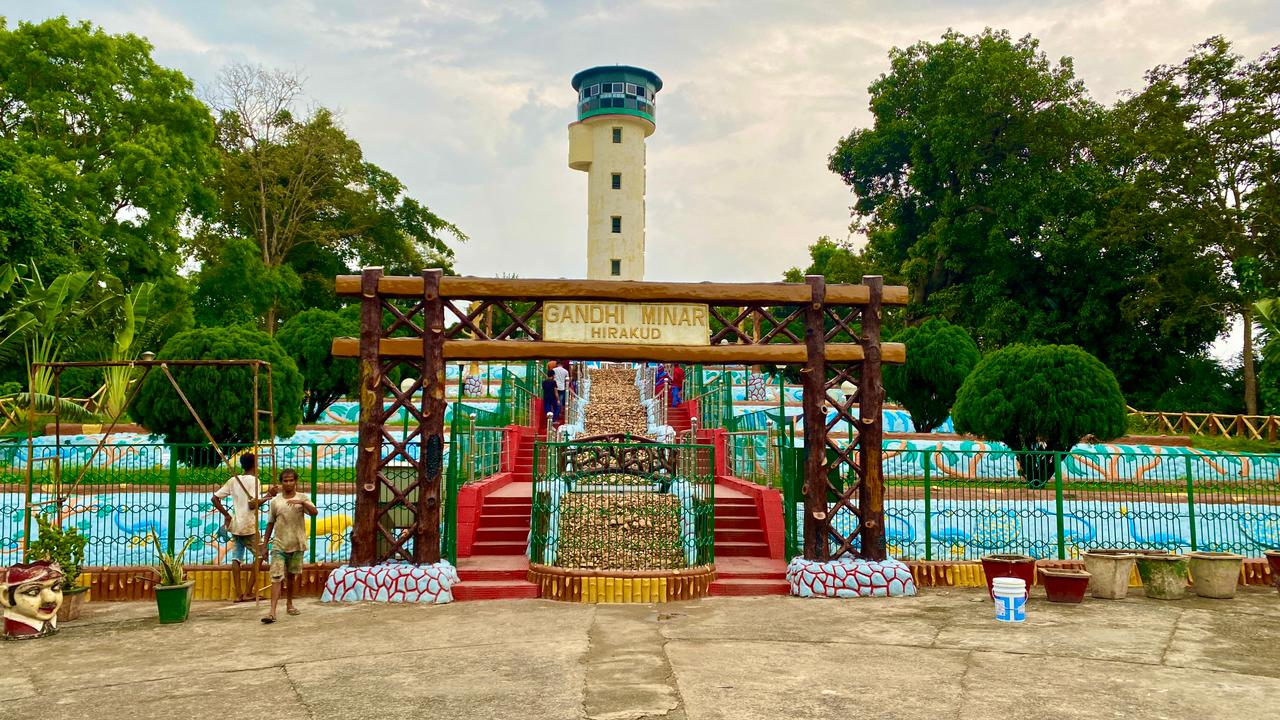
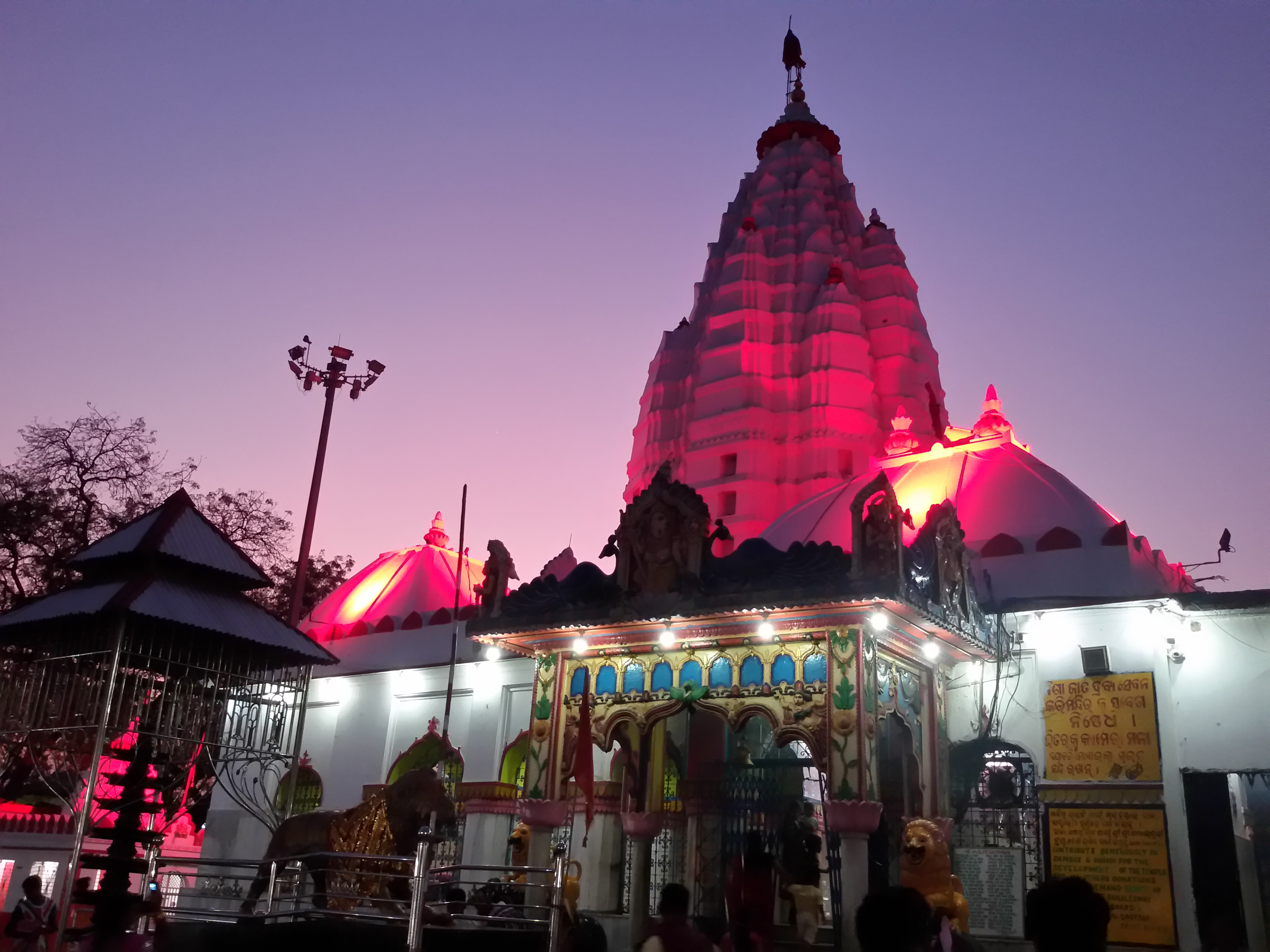
- Hirakud Dam Mahanadi Coalfield Limited IIM Sambalpur Gandhi Minar, Hirakud Samaleswari Temple
- Nickname: Handloom City
- Location in Odisha, India Sambalpur (India)
- Coordinates: 21.47°N 83.97°E
- Country: India
- State: Odisha
- District: Sambalpur
- Named for: Maa Samaleswari

Government
  - Type: Municipal Corporation
  - Body: Sambalpur Municipal Corporation (SMC)
  - District Magistrate: Siddheshwar Baliram Bondar, IAS
  - Municipal Commissioner: Shri Rehan Khatri, IAS
  - Member of Parliament: Dharmendra Pradhan, BJP
  - Member of Legislative Assembly: Jay Narayan Mishra, BJP

Area
  - Total: 303 km^{2} (117 sq mi)
  - Rank: 5th
- Elevation: 135 m (443 ft)

Population (2011)
  - Total: 335,761
  - Rank: 133rd in India and 5th in Odisha according to 2011 census
  - Density: 1,110/km^{2} (2,870/sq mi)
- Demonym: Sambalpuria

Languages
  - Official: Odia, English
  - Spoken: Sambalpuri
- Time zone: UTC+5:30 (IST)
- PIN: 768001-768XXX
- Telephone code: 0663
- Vehicle registration: OD-15
- Literacy: 63.59%
- Website: smcsambalpur.nic.in

Sambalpur (Odia: [sɔmbɔlɔpuɾɔ]), also known as Sambalpore, is the fifth-largest city in the Indian State of Odisha. It is located on the banks of river Mahanadi, with a population of 335,761 (as per 2011 census). Prehistoric settlements have been recorded there. It is the home of the Sambalpuri sari.

== Overview ==
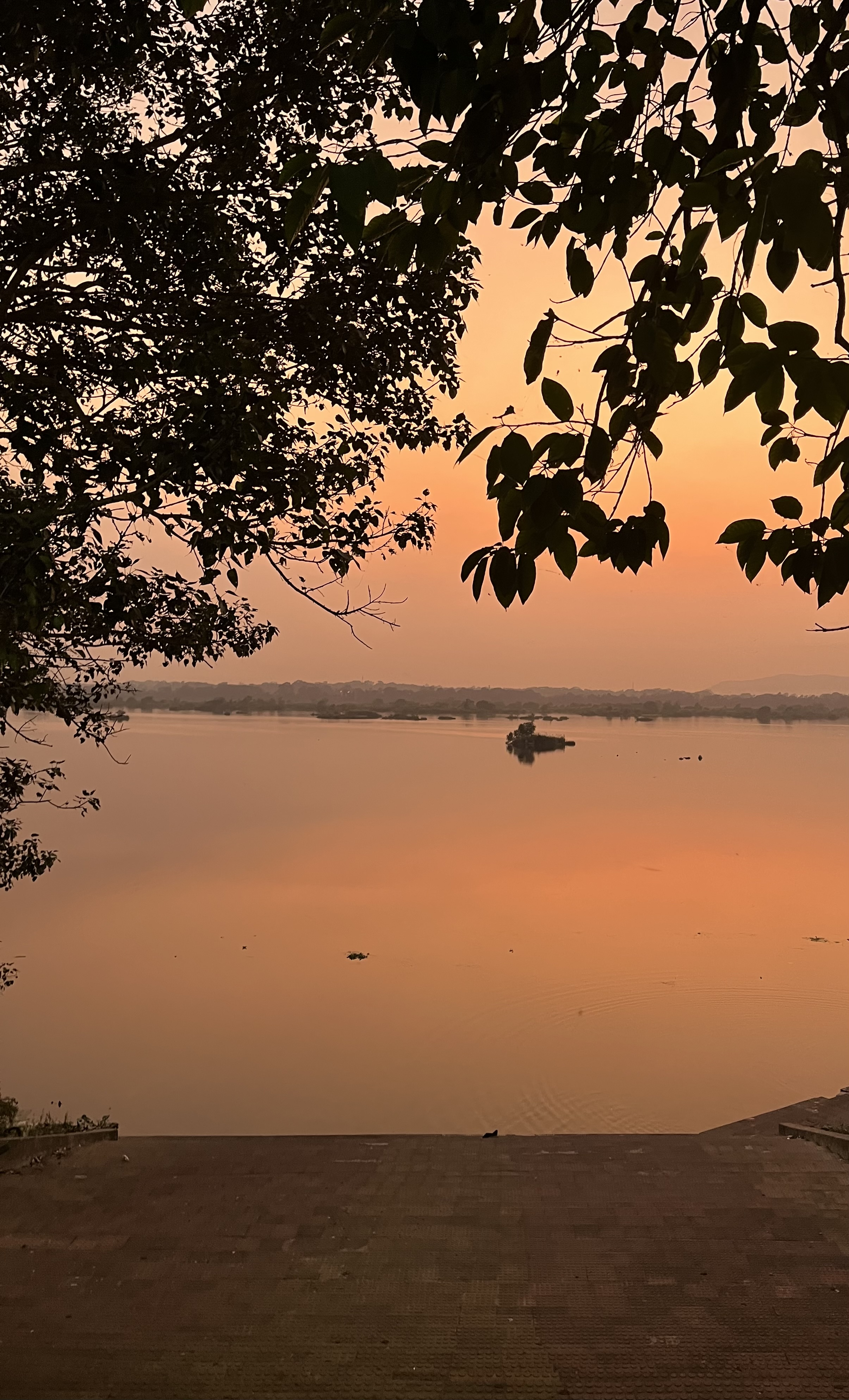
The Mahanadi river in the orange sky during evening time near sunset

The city contains many temples, historic buildings and parks. Educational institutes include Sambalpur University, Veer Surendra Sai Institute of Medical Sciences and Research (VIMSAR), Veer Surendra Sai University of Technology (VSSUT), Gangadhar Meher University, Indian Institute of Management Sambalpur and Odisha State Open University (OSOU). Hirakud Dam, the longest earthen dam in the world and the largest artificial lake of Asia, is at Sambalpur.

After the independence of India, many commercial and government establishments sprung up in and around Sambalpur. It is a major railway junction of Odisha with the headquarters of Sambalpur Railway Division under the East Coast Railway Zone. National Highway 53, National Highway 55 pass through the City and State Highway 10 & 15 originate from the city.

== Etymology ==
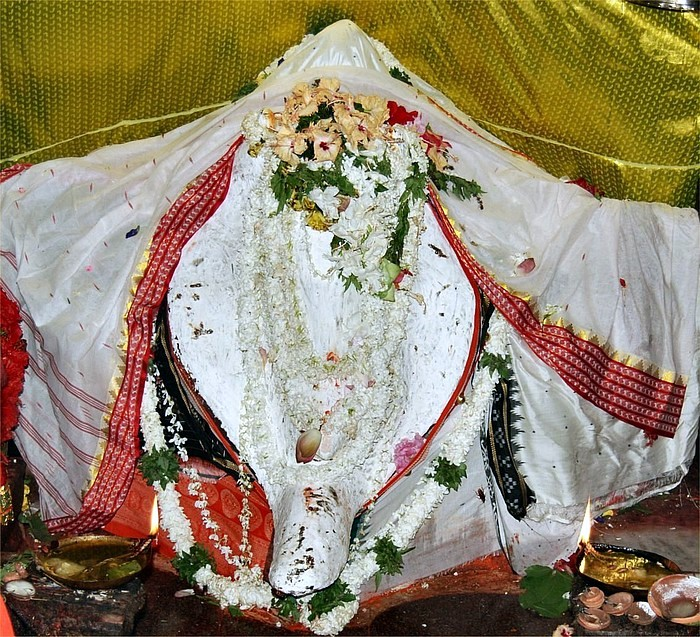
Maa Samalei, the Hindu deity from whom the city derives its name

Sambalpur derives its name from the Hindu Goddess Samalei (Odia: ସମଲେଇ ମାଁ), who is regarded as the reigning deity of the region. The region in which Sambalpur city is located was also known as Hirakhanda from ancient times. Historically, it has also been known as "Sambalaka". Claudius Ptolemy called it "Sambalak".

== History ==
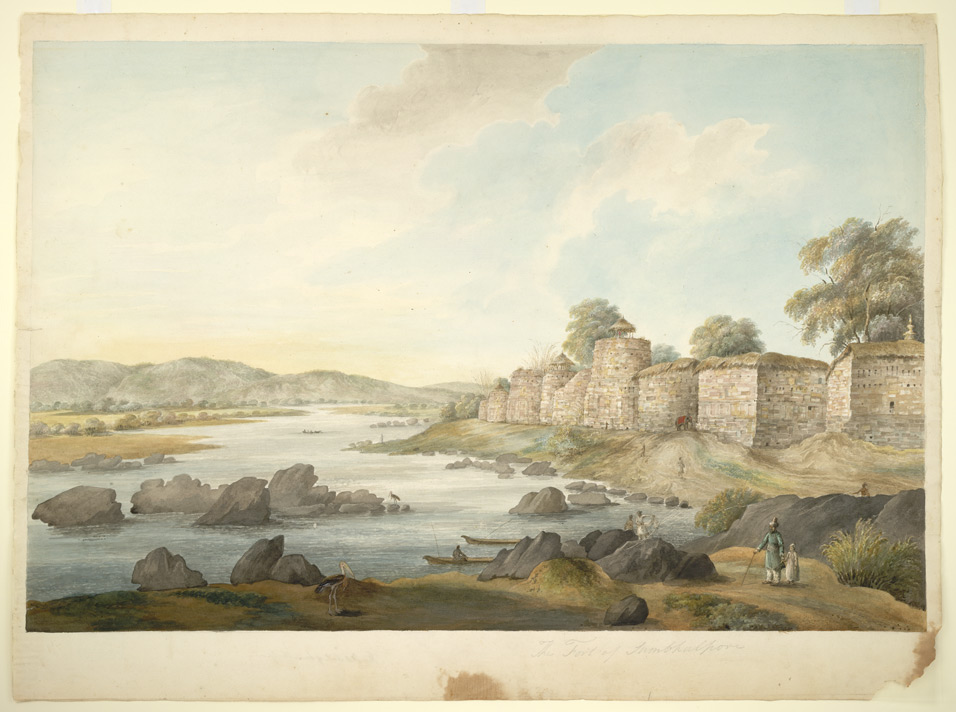
The fort at Sambalpur in 1825 (British Library)

Artifacts have been discovered that indicate settlement in prehistoric times. Some historians identify it as the city of "Sambalaka" mentioned by the second century CE Roman geographer Ptolemy, who mentioned that the city produces diamonds. In the fourth century CE, the Gupta emperor conquered the territory of "Dakshina Koshala", comprising roughly present day Sambalpur, Bilaspur, and Raipur. In the early sixth century CE Chalukya king Pulakesin II is said to have conquered south Kosala by defeating the then Panduvamsi king Balarjuna Sivagupta. The next dynasty to rule South Kosala was the Sombvamsi dynasty. Somavamshi King Janamajaya-I Mahabhavagupta (Circa 882–922 CE) consolidated the eastern part of Kosala comprising the modern undivided Sambalpur and Bolangir districts and established matrimonial relationship with the Bhauma-Kara dynasty ruling over the coastal modern Odisha. After Uddyotakeshari (c. 1040–1065 C.E.), the Somavamshi kingdom declined gradually. The dynasty lost its territories to the Nagas in the north-west, and the Gangas in the south. After the decline of Somvamshis the area came under Telugu Chodas for a short period. The last Telugu Choda king of south Kosala was Somesvara III who was defeated by Kalachuri king Jajalladeva-I around 1119 CE. The kalachuris had an intermittent conflict with the Ganga Dynasty of Utkala (present-day coastal Odisha). Ultimately Kalachuris lost the Sambalpur Sonepur region to Gangas during reign of Anangabhima Deva-III (1211–1238 C.E.). The Ganga kingdom ruled the Sambalpur region for two more centuries, but faced aggression of the Bengal sultanate from the north and Vijayanagara and Bahmani empires of the south. These struggles weakened the Ganga hold on Sambalpur. Ultimately Ramai Deva, a Chauhan Rajput from North India founded Chauhan rule in western Orissa.

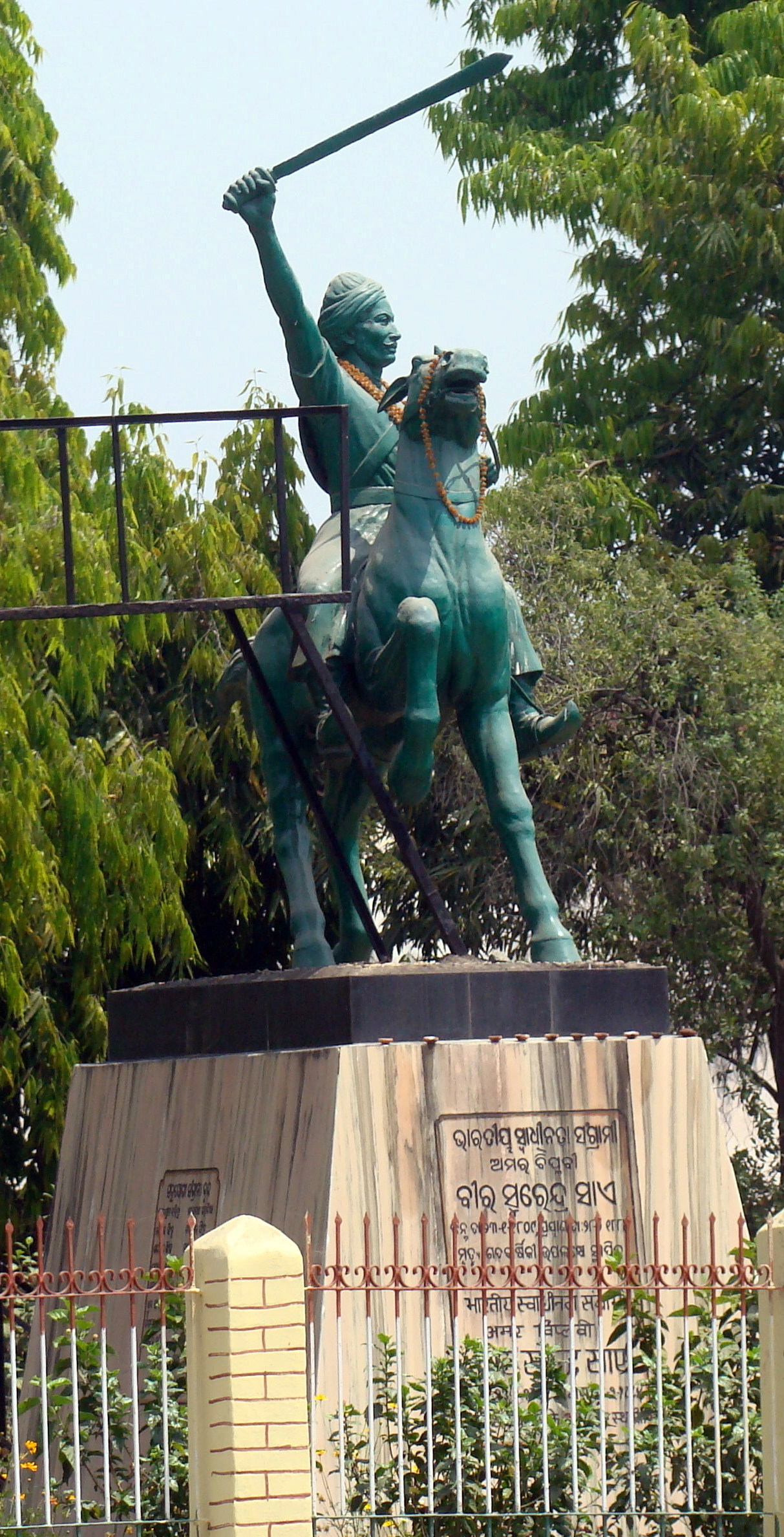
Statue of Veer Surendra Sai at Jail Chhak

Sambalpur came under the Bhonsle of Nagpur when the Maratha conquered Sambalpur in 1800. After the Third Anglo-Maratha War in 1817, the British Government returned Sambalpur to the Chauhan king, Jayant Singh, but his authority over the other princely states was taken out.

In January 1896, Hindi was made the official language of Sambalpur, replacing the Odia language, which after violent protests was reinstated again. During the partition of Bengal in 1905 Sambalpur and the adjacent Odia-speaking tracts were amalgamated with the Odisha Division under Bengal Presidency. Bengal's Odisha division became part of the new province of Bihar and Odisha in 1912, and in April 1936 became the separate province of Odisha, with addition of Undivided Ganjam and Koraput districts from Madras Presidency. After Indian Independence on 15 August 1947, Odisha became an Indian state. The rulers of the princely states of Western Odisha acceded to the Government of India in January 1948 and became part of Odisha state.

From 1825 to 1827, Lieutenant Colonel Gilbert (1785–1853), later Lieutenant General Sir Walter Gilbert, 1st Baronet, G.C.B., was the political agent for the South West Frontier with headquarters at Sambalpur. Several paintings made during his stay at Sambalpur by an unknown artist are currently in the British Library and Victoria and Albert Museum.

=== Vajrayana Buddhism ===
Although it is generally accepted that Tantric Buddhism first developed in the country of Uddiyana or Odra Desha under King Indrabhuti, there is an old and well known scholarly dispute as to whether Uddiyana or Odra was in the Swat valley, Odisha or some other place.

Indrabhuti, the oldest known king of Sambalpur, founded Vajrayana, while his sister, who was married to Yuvaraja Jalendra of Lankapuri (Suvarnapur), founded Sahajayana. These new Tantric cults of Buddhism introduced the mantra, mudra and mandala along with six Tantric Abhicharas (practices) such as Marana, Stambhana, Sammohana, Vidvesan, Uchchatana and Vajikarana. The Tantric Buddhist sects made efforts to raise the dignity of the lowest of the low of the society to a higher plane. It revived primitive beliefs and practices a simpler and less formal approach to the personal god, a liberal and respectful attitude towards women and denial of caste system.

From the seventh century A.D. onwards, many popular religious elements of heterogeneous nature were incorporated into Mahayana Buddhism which finally resulted in the origin of Vajrayana, Kalachakrayana and Sahajayana Tantric Buddhism. Tantric Buddhism first developed in Uddiyana, a country which was divided into two kingdoms, Sambhala and Lankapuri. Sambhala has been identified with Sambalpur and Lankapuri with Subarnapura (Sonepur).

== Geography and climate ==
Sambalpur

Climate chart (precipitation, max. and min. temperature)
J	F	M	A	M	J	J	A	S	O	N	D
15 28 18	21 29 21	21 31 25	25 32 27	69 33 28	178 33 28	291 32 27	361 32 27	261 32 27	169 32 25	66 30 21	11 28 18
- █ Average max. and min. temperatures in °C
- █ Precipitation totals in mm
- Source: India Meteorological Department
Imperial conversion
J	F	M	A	M	J	J	A	S	O	N	D
0.6 82 64	0.8 84 71	0.8 88 77	1 89 80	2.7 91 82	7 91 82	11 89 80	14 89 80	10 90 80	6.6 90 77	2.6 87 70	0.4 83 64
- █ Average max. and min. temperatures in °F
- █ Precipitation totals in inches

Sambalpur is located at 21°.27' North Latitude and 83°.58' East Longitude. The average elevation is 150.75 metres (494.6 ft) above the mean sea level. Sambalpur falls under the Zone-3 seismic number, which shows the possibility of an earthquake.

Sambalpur lies on the bank of the river Mahanadi. The river flows to the west of the city and separates Burla from Sambalpur and Hirakud. The Hirakud Dam lies upstream of Sambalpur. Budharaja is a small reserve forest located within the city. Sambalpur experiences an extreme type of climate with hot and dry summers followed by humid monsoons and cold winters. The hot season commences from the first week of March and lasts until the second half of June. In May, the temperature rises up to 47 °C (117 °F). In December, the temperature comes down to 5 °C (41 °F). Sambalpur gets rainfall from the south western monsoon. The most pleasant months in Sambalpur are from October to February, during which time the humidity and heat are at their lowest. During this period, temperatures during the day stay below 30 °C (86 °F) and drop to about 20 °C (68 °F) at night. This season is followed by a hot summer, from March to May. The summer gives way to the monsoon season. Since 1982 as per the data available with District Emergency section, Sambalpur, there has not been a single occurrence of cyclone in Sambalpur. There are possibilities of strong winds with the speed of 53 km/h (33 mph) before the onset of monsoon. The relative humidity is high during the rainy season, generally being over 75%. After the rainy season the humidity gradually decreases and the weather becomes dry towards the winter. The best time to visit Sambalpur is between September and March. The heaviest-ever recorded rainfall in Sambalpur was 581.9 mm (22.91 in) in 1982, which was the highest ever in Odisha until September 2010. The low-lying areas of the Sambalpur town on Mahanadi river are prone to flooding.

Climate data for Sambalpur, Odisha (Normals: 1991–2020, Records: 1901–2012)
Month	Jan	Feb	Mar	Apr	May	Jun	Jul	Aug	Sep	Oct	Nov	Dec	Year
Record high °C (°F)	33.9 (93.0)	37.8 (100.0)	44.7 (112.5)	46.6 (115.9)	47.7 (117.9)	49.0 (120.2)	42.9 (109.2)	40.0 (104.0)	39.9 (103.8)	40.9 (105.6)	36.1 (97.0)	34.1 (93.4)	49.0 (120.2)
Mean daily maximum °C (°F)	27.9 (82.2)	31.2 (88.2)	35.4 (95.7)	39.5 (103.1)	41.2 (106.2)	37.1 (98.8)	31.9 (89.4)	31.5 (88.7)	32.7 (90.9)	32.8 (91.0)	30.7 (87.3)	28.4 (83.1)	33.3 (91.9)
Mean daily minimum °C (°F)	11.5 (52.7)	14.8 (58.6)	18.9 (66.0)	22.9 (73.2)	25.3 (77.5)	25.1 (77.2)	24.1 (75.4)	23.9 (75.0)	23.6 (74.5)	21.0 (69.8)	15.8 (60.4)	11.5 (52.7)	19.8 (67.6)
Record low °C (°F)	3.6 (38.5)	5.2 (41.4)	8.8 (47.8)	14.4 (57.9)	16.0 (60.8)	17.0 (62.6)	18.2 (64.8)	16.8 (62.2)	17.8 (64.0)	11.5 (52.7)	7.4 (45.3)	3.8 (38.8)	3.6 (38.5)
Average rainfall mm (inches)	15.2 (0.60)	15.0 (0.59)	14.5 (0.57)	15.4 (0.61)	30.1 (1.19)	228.5 (9.00)	402.2 (15.83)	494.6 (19.47)	238.7 (9.40)	52.8 (2.08)	4.1 (0.16)	5.8 (0.23)	1,516.9 (59.72)
Average rainy days	1.2	1.2	1.5	1.4	2.6	9.2	16.0	16.8	10.7	3.7	0.5	0.8	65.7
Average relative humidity (%) (at 17:30 IST)	57	52	47	40	39	57	79	81	78	71	66	62	61
Source: India Meteorological Department

== Transport ==
Roads

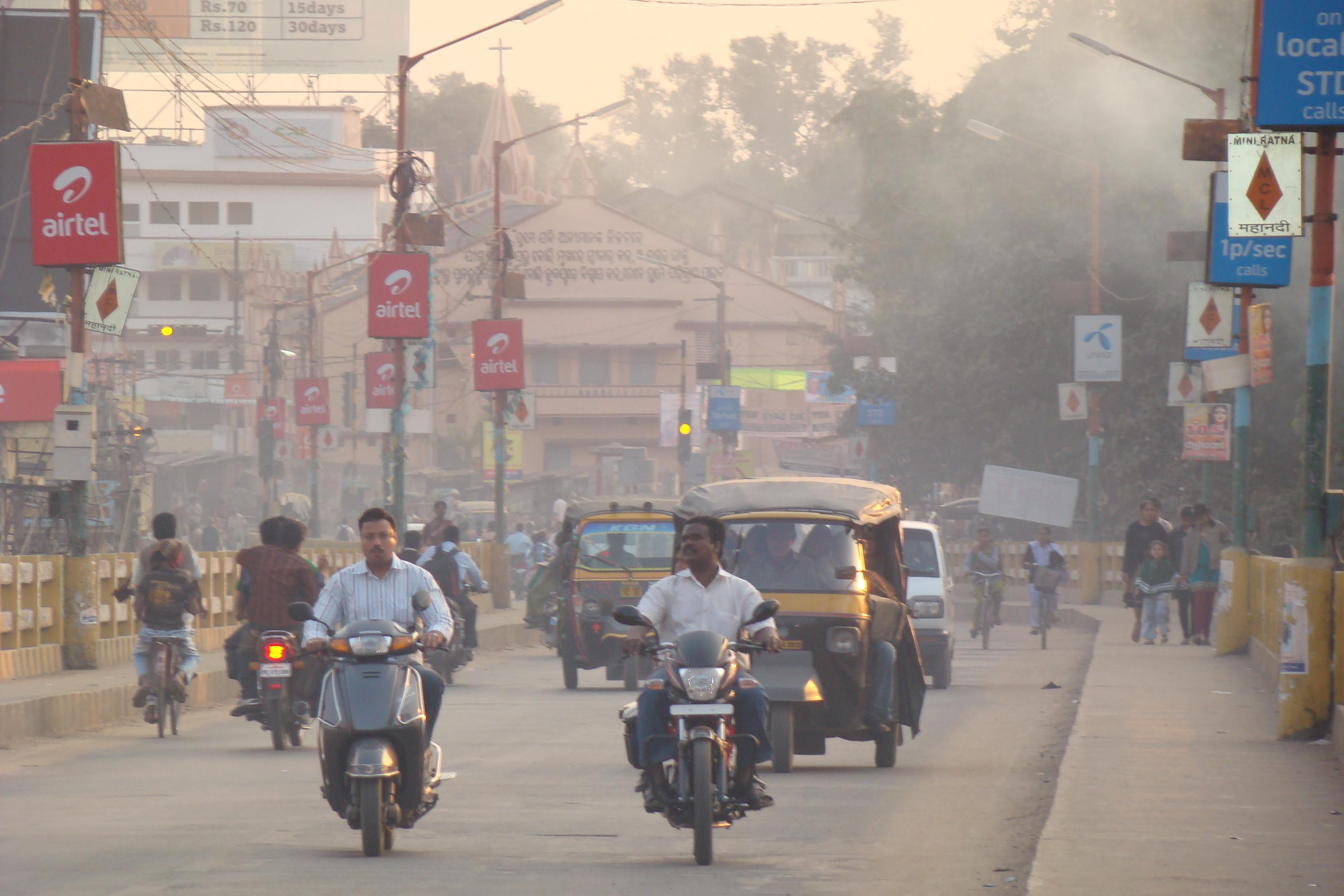
Commuters coming back after office hours, Fatak.

Sambalpur is connected to the rest of Odisha and India by national highway – NH 53/Economic Corridor 1 (EC1), which is a part of Asian Highway-AH46 (Mumbai-Kolkata Highway). NH 55 connects with Cuttack and Bhubaneswar, State Highway 15 connects with Sonepur, State Highway 10 (SH10) connects with Jharsuguda and Rourkela and the new Biju Expressway connects Rourkela-Sambalpur-Bargarh-Jagdalpur. Most parts of the city are well connected with government-provided Mo Bus services.

Rail

Sambalpur is one of the three railway divisions under East Coast Railway zone of Indian Railways. Sambalpur Junction railway station (SBP) is a major railway station in Odisha and headquarters of Sambalpur railway division. This railway station is the cleanest railway station of East Coast Railway declared by Indian Railway. There are three other railway stations serving Sambalpur: Sambalpur City Railway Station, Hirakud, across the Mahanadi and Maneswar Railway Station.

Air

The nearest airport is Veer Surendra Sai Airport, Jharsuguda (62 km; 39 mi). Biju Patnaik International Airport, Bhubaneswar is located at a distance of (325 km; 202 mi). Other nearby airports are Swami Vivekananda International Airport, Raipur and Birsa Munda Airport, Ranchi.

== Demographics ==
Historical population
Year	Pop.	±%
1891	14,571	—
1901	12,870	−11.7%
1941	17,079	+32.7%
1950	23,525	+37.7%
1961	38,915	+65.4%
1971	64,675	+66.2%
1981	110,283	+70.5%
1991	189,611	+71.9%
2001	226,469	+19.4%
2011	269,565	+19.0%
1891 to 1981 data of Sambalpur Municipality; from 1991 onwards the data presented is of Sambalpur Municipal Corporation Area; Source:

Religions in Sambalpur M Corp (2011)
Religion	Percent
Hinduism	90.25%
Islam	6.21%
Christianity	2.34%
Sikhism	0.82%
Other or not stated	0.38%

Sambalpur city is governed by a Municipality which comes under Sambalpur Municipal Corporation Area. As of 2011 India census, Although Sambalpur city has a population of 183,383, its urban population is 269,575, of whom 138,826 are males and 130,749 are females; this includes Burla and Hirakud. Sambalpur has an average literacy rate of 85.69%, in which male literacy is 90.30 and female literacy is 80.92 percent. The sex ratio is 942 and the child sex ratio is 882. The total children (0–6) in Sambalpur city were 18,555 as per the Census India report of 2011. There were 9,857 boys while 8,698 were girls.

Languages spoken in Sambalpur M Corp (2011)
1. Odia (48.36%)
2. Sambalpuri (26.27%)
3. Hindi (11.65%)
4. Urdu (2.38%)
5. Bengali (1.89%)
6. Mundari (1.04%)
7. Telugu (1.03%)
8. 'Other' Hindi (1.00%)
9. Others (6.38%)

== Economy ==
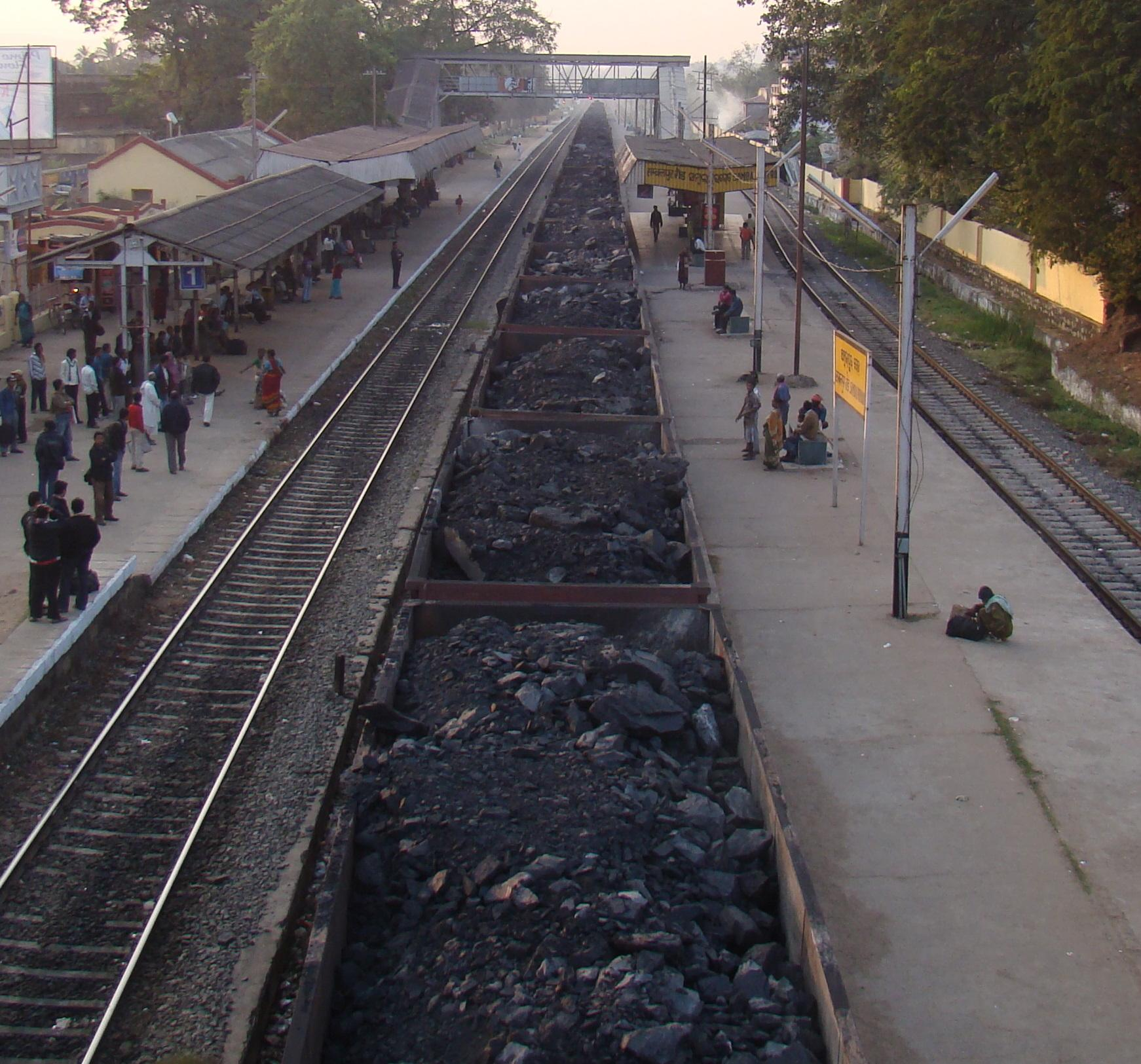
A coal laden goods train at Sambalpur Road

The economy of Sambalpur is basically dependent on trade. Most of the residents are either salaried or self-employed. Forest products play an important role in the economy in terms of contribution to revenue and domestic product. Kendu leaf, Coromandel ebony or East Indian ebony (Diospyros melanoxylon) also forms part of the local economy, with many bidi manufacturing units functioning in Sambalpur.

Gole Bazaar is the main merchandising area of the city. It is famous for handloom and other textile products. Other merchandising areas are Khetrajpur, Fatak, V.S.S. Marg, Budharaja and Farm road. Budharaja is the central hub of the malls and jewellery shops.

Mahanadi Coalfields Limited, a subsidiary of Coal India Limited located at Sambalpur, produced 100.28 million tonnes (98.70 million long tons; 110.54 million short tons) of coal and had a profit before tax during 2010–2011 at Rs 4039.30 crore. Hirakud, in the vicinity of Sambalpur, was conceptualized as an industrial town by the erstwhile Chief Minister of Odisha, Biju Patnaik. On completion of the Hirakud Dam, power intensive industries such as aluminium smelters, cable manufacturing, steel re-rolling mills etc. established their presence in Hirakud. In the 1970s, Hirakud was a major industrial centre of Odisha, perhaps next only to Rourkela. At this point in time however, the main functional unit at Hirakud is the aluminium smelter of Hindalco and its associated units. The smelter set up by Jindal Steel and Power in 1959 at Hirakud and later acquired by Hindalco, was the country's second aluminium smelter operating on grid power sourced from the hydro power station of the Hirakud Dam. It was the first in India to adopt clean coal combustion technology that uses a circulating fluidised bed, which is considered environmentally friendly. Currently the smelter has a capacity of 213,000 tonnes per year (210,000 long tons per year; 235,000 short tons per year), and provides employment to around 1700 people.

== Education ==
Sambalpur University

The pre-collegiate medium of instruction in schools is predominantly English and Odia. The medium of instruction in educational institutions after matriculation in colleges is English. Other media of instruction also exist in Sambalpur. Schools and colleges in Sambalpur are either government-run or run by private trusts and individuals. The schools are affiliated with either the Orissa State Board under BSE or CHSE, Indian Certificate of Secondary Education (ICSE) and the Central Board for Secondary Education (CBSE). After completing 10 years of schooling in secondary education, students enroll in higher secondary school, specialising in one of the three streams – Arts, Commerce or Science.

Since the 2000s, there have been a large number of professional institutions established in a variety of fields. The earliest schools established in Sambalpur were the CSB Zilla School (1852) and the Lady Lewis Girls High School (1942). VSS Medical College was established in 1959 and VSSUT in 1956. High School for Blind (1972) and High School for Deaf and Dumb (1972), Burla are Govt. educational institutions imparting education to physically challenged children.

Sambalpur Football Academy

Sambalpur Kala Parishad is the pioneering organisation for the promotion of Sambalpuri dance, and has been responsible for the revolutionary growth of this dance. It imparts education and training on this form of dance.

Educational institutions in the city include Gangadhar Meher University, Government Women's College, Netaji Subhash Chandra Bose College, Lajpat Rai Law College, Silicon Institute of Technology, Sambalpur, Delhi Public School, Kendriya Vidyalaya, St. Joseph's Convent Higher Secondary School (SJC-SBP), Gurunanak Public School, Madnawati Public School (MPS), Indian Public School (IPS), St. John's School, Seven Hills Residential School (SHRS), Sri Aurobindo School (SAIIE&R) and DAV Public School. A new Indian Institute of Management, Sambalpur (IIM) has been set up in the city. The Sambalpur chapter of the Institute of Cost Accountants of India was set up in 2010.

== Notable people ==
- Bhima Bhoi: blind poet
- Krupasindhu Bhoi: Member of Parliament, Sambalpur Constituency
- Gangadhar Meher: poet of Odisha
- Laxminarayan Mishra: freedom fighter, politician
- Pramod Kumar Mishra: Principal Secretary to P.M.
- Sarat Pujari: actor in Odia Film Industry
- Suresh Pujari: Minister of Revenue and Disaster management of Odisha
- Veer Surendra Sai: freedom fighter of Odisha, Lion King of Sambalpur
- Dr Isaac Santra: social worker
- Shraddhakar Supakar: social activist, politician and writer, MLA of Sambalpur, Member Of Rajya sabha

== Culture ==
=== Sambalpur Lok Mahotsav ===
Sambalpur Lok Mahostav

A cultural manifestation of the hidden age-old traditional performing art of a vast geographical area is possible through this annual celebration of the festival called Lok Mahotsav. This festival is a reflection of the socio-anthropological evolution of the people of India. Lok Mahotsav shows the integrity and unison of the heritage, culture, music and lifestyle of Western Odisha. Live performances of folk music and dance from all parts of India are shown under one stage.

=== Sitalsasthi Carnival ===
This is the marriage ceremony of the god Siva and goddess Parvati. Sitalsasthi is a carnival of folk dance and music along with decorated stands of gods and goddesses. People from all walks of life participate in large numbers in the carnival. Artists from different states of India take part in the carnival making it a colourful extravaganza.

=== Kalki Avatar and Sambalpur ===
Kalachakra tantra was first taught by the Buddha to King Indrabhuti, the first dharmaraja of Shambhala. It is widely believed that the next Hindu avatar known as Kalki will be born at Sambalpur or Shambhala, as this place was known in olden times. There are several mentions of the place Shambhala in different Hindu and Buddhist religious texts as the birthplace of Kalki. The Mahabharatra (Vana Parva, 190.93–97) and Srimad-Bhagavatam Bhag.12.2.18 give reference of Shambhala as the birthplace.

== Tourism ==
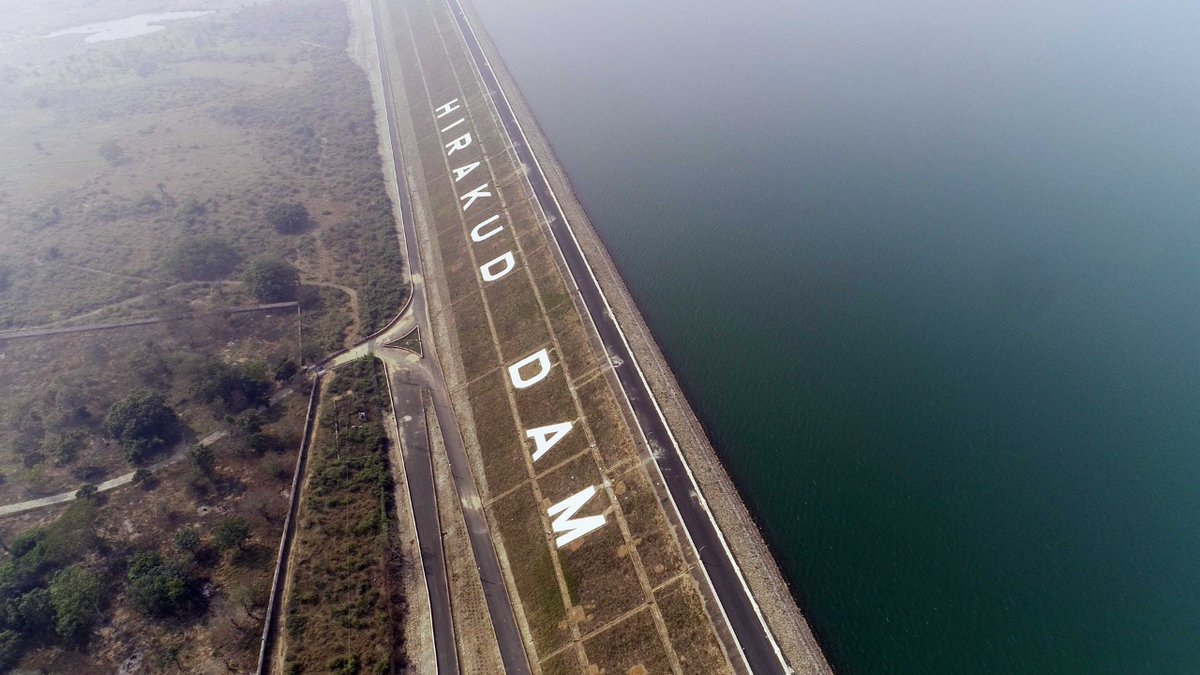
Hirakud Dam

The world-famous Hirakud Dam, built in 1956 across the Mahanadi River, about 15 km (9.3 mi) from Sambalpur, is a major tourist attraction. It is one of the longest dams in the world, about 26 km (16 mi) in length. It also forms the biggest artificial lake in Asia, with a reservoir covering 743 km^{2} (287 sq mi) at full capacity with a shoreline of over 640 km (400 mi). It also attracts a large number of migratory birds in winter.

The Leaning Temple of Huma, located about 25 km (16 mi) from Sambalpur, built in the 17th century, leans at an angle of approximately 47 degrees to the west. (Pasayat, 1998, 2003, 2004, 2007, 2008). It is one of a kind in India.

Samaleswari Temple is the main temple of the goddess Samaleswari, located on the banks of river the Mahanadi. Sambalpur owes its name to her.

Chiplima (Chipilima Hydro Electric Project (CHEP)) located about 37 km (23 mi) from Sambalpur, is known for a natural fall (24.38 m (80.0 ft) in height) harnessed for generating electricity. It is an ideal picnic spot and famous for Ghanteswari Temple, the presiding deity of the place. This temple played an important role for river navigation in the past.

=== Lost Temples of Hirakud Dam ===
These are remnants of temples submerged after the dam was completed in 1957. In summer, due to the receding water of the dam, the structures become visible. These hidden treasures have finally caught the attention of historians and steps are being taken to understand the historical significance of these temples which periodically go under water, only to resurface again. Many temples have been destroyed after 58 years of underwater existence. However, some remain intact.

Interest in these lost temples has been rekindled after two stones, etched with writing ('Shila Lekha'), were recovered from what is believed to be the Padmaseni temple of the submerged Padmapur village. The temples located inside the reservoir area were part of the then Padmapur, one of the oldest and most populous villages in the region prior to the dam construction. More than 200 temples were submerged by the dam; nearly 150 temples have either perished or are underwater and about 50 are visible during summer. These lost temples present excellent opportunities for scuba diving enthusiasts to explore under the Hirakud Dam. These temple are visible to visitors on boats only during the summer months of May and June.

== Politics ==
Sambalpur is part of Sambalpur (Lok Sabha constituency). Sitting MP from Sambalpur is Mr Dharmendra Pradhan of Bhartiya Janata Party (BJP). The current MLA of Sambalpur (Odisha Vidhan Sabha constituency) is Jayanarayan Mishra of Bhartiya Janata Party (BJP). Previous MLAs from this seat were Dr. Raseswari Panigrahi (BJD), who won this seat in 2014; Durgashankar Pattanaik of INC, in 1995 and 1990; Sraddhakar Supakar of INC in 1985; Ashwini Kumar Guru of INC (I) in 1980; and Late Dr. Jhasaketan Sahu of JNP in 1977. Sriballav Panigrahi of Indian National Congress represented Sambalpur in the Odisha Lesgislative Assembly in 1971 and 1973.

== See also ==
- Sambalpuri cinema
- Sambalpuri language
- Sambalpuri saree
