= Isaac Santra =

Indian physician (1892–1968)

- Born: 3 November 1892; Sambalpur, Odisha, India
- Died: 29 August 1968 (aged 75); Sambalpur, Odisha, India
- Resting place: 21.47°N 83.97°E
- Occupation: Physician
- Known for: Leprosy eradication efforts
- Spouse: Rajkumari Das
- Children: Two daughters and three sons
- Awards: Padma Shri; Rai Saheb

Isaac Santra was an Indian physician, gandhian and social worker, known for his contributions for the eradication of Leprosy from India. The Government of India honoured him in 1956, with the award of Padma Shri, the fourth highest Indian civilian award for his services to the nation.

== Biography ==
Isaac Santra was born on 3 November 1892 in Sambalpur in the western part of the Indian state of Odisha to a pastor and his wife in a family with meagre financial resources. Going against the wishes of his father who wanted the young Isaac to be pastor, he did his schooling in Sambalpur and joined Shri Ramachandra Bhanj Medical College, Cuttack in 1919 to secure a medical degree. His experience during his medical education and the social stigma associated with the disease of leprosy impacted the young man and he decided to pursue his career treating the disease. Santra started his medical career by joining the Central Government service and headed the Leprosy Survey of India during 1927 to 1931. In 1932, he was selected as a member of the Leprosy Prevention Society of Great Britain and retained the position till his retirement in 1947. He also served on deputation to countries such as Japan and Nigeria during various occasions as Leprosy Expert of the International Leprosy Association. Notes on Leprosy in Japan is a publication he has brought out in 1953, post his service in Japan.

After retirement from government service, Santra tried to gather resources and, by obtaining government assistance, he founded Hatibari Kushtashram, in 1951, later to be known as Hatibari Health Home, in Hatibari, a village near the Jujomura Block[Odisha] states. At a time when Dapsone, a drug for the treatment of leprosy was yet to be formulated, he turned to ancient Indian scriptures such as Sushruta Samhita and came out with a medicine made of chaulmoogra (Hydnocarpus wightianus) and started treating leprosy patients with this drug. The place soon developed into a treatment and rehabilitation centre from where patients cured of the disease will be assisted in reintegration into the mainstream society. He served the Health Home till his death after which the centre was taken over by Hind Kustha Nibarini Sangha (HKNS), and was brought under the jurisdiction of the Government of Odisha.

Isaac Santra was married to Rajkumari Das and one of his sons, Dilip Kumar Santra is also a medical doctor. His eldest son, Prasanta Chitta Santra served in the Indian Air Force and retired as Air Vice Marshall. Dr. Santra died on 29 August 1968, aged 76, succumbing to the injuries sustained during a domestic accident at his home in Sambalpur.

== Awards and recognitions ==
The British Government conferred the title of Rai Saheb on Santra in 1938. The Government of India recognized his services to the society by awarding him the fourth highest Indian civilian honour of Padma Shri in 1956. The village of Sambalpur is home to a social institute, Isaac Santra Institute of Social Work and Community Health, named after him. Smile Foundation India, a non governmental organization, has named one of its children's home as Dr. Isaac Santra Balniketan.

== See also ==
- Health in India
