= Gangadhar Meher University =

Private university in Odisha, India

- Other names: GMU, GM UNIVERSITY
- Former names: Sambalpur College, Gangadhar Meher College
- Motto: Knowledge Imparts Immortality
- Type: Public
- Established: 1944; 82 years ago (as college); 2015; 11 years ago (as university)
- Accreditation: UGC
- Chancellor: Governor of Odisha
- Location: Sambalpur, Odisha, India; 21.4828°N 83.9798°E
- Campus: Urban
- Website: www.gmuniversity.ac.in

Gangadhar Meher University, Amruta Vihar, formerly Sambalpur College and Gangadhar Meher College, is a state university situated in Sambalpur, Odisha, India. It is named after the Odia poet, Gangadhar Meher. N. Nagaraju is the current vice-chancellor, while Jugaleswari Dash is the registrar and Uma Charan Pati the deputy registrar.

== History ==
The university was established in 1944 as Sambalpur College with 192 students. The name of the institution was changed to Gangadhar Meher College in 1949. It was upgraded to a university in 2015, and has been renamed as Gangadhar Meher University.
