= Indian Institute of Management Sambalpur =

Business school in Sambalpur, India

- Motto: navasarjanam śucitā samāveśatvam
- Motto in English: Innovation, Integrity and Inclusiveness
- Type: Public business School
- Established: 23 September 2015 (10 years ago)
- Budget: ₹304.67 crore (US$32 million) (FY2024-25 est.)
- Chairperson: Chandan Chowdhury
- Director: Mahadeo Jaiswal
- Faculty: 74
- Students: 728
- Postgraduates: 630
- Doctoral students: 98
- Location: Basantpur, Goshala, Sambalpur, Odisha, 768025, India; 21.41942°N 83.91580°E
- Campus: 237 acres (960,000 m^{2}); Rural area
- Colors: Blue and White
- Nickname: The Handcrafted IIM
- Website: iimsambalpur.ac.in

Indian Institute of Management Sambalpur (informally known as IIM Sambalpur; abbreviated as IIM-S) is a public business school located in Sambalpur, Odisha, India.

== History ==
IIM Sambalpur was announced in 2014 by the central Ministry of Human Resource Development (MHRD) and founded on 23 September 2015. The first batch of students started in September 2015.

It was initially mentored by IIM Indore until appointment of its independent director. IIM Sambalpur was registered as a Society under Societies Registration Act, XXI of 1860 on 19 August 2015. The present campus of IIM Sambalpur has been set up at Jyoti Vihar, Burla, Sambalpur, Odisha. IIM Sambalpur has been allotted a piece of land measuring over 237 acres (960,000 m^{2}) in Basantpur, for the permanent campus by the Government of Odisha.

As of 2021 it's headed by Mahadeo Jaiswal as the director.

== Campus ==
In 2018, the Government of India proposed a budget of ₹400 crore (US$42 million) for facilitating the construction of the permanent campus. The Government of Odisha has selected 237 acres (960,000 m^{2}) of land for the construction of the permanent campus of IIM Sambalpur at Basantpur. Prime Minister Narendra Modi laid the foundation stone of the permanent campus on 2 January 2021. The permanent campus of IIM Sambalpur is inaugurated by PM Narendra Modi on 3 February 2024.

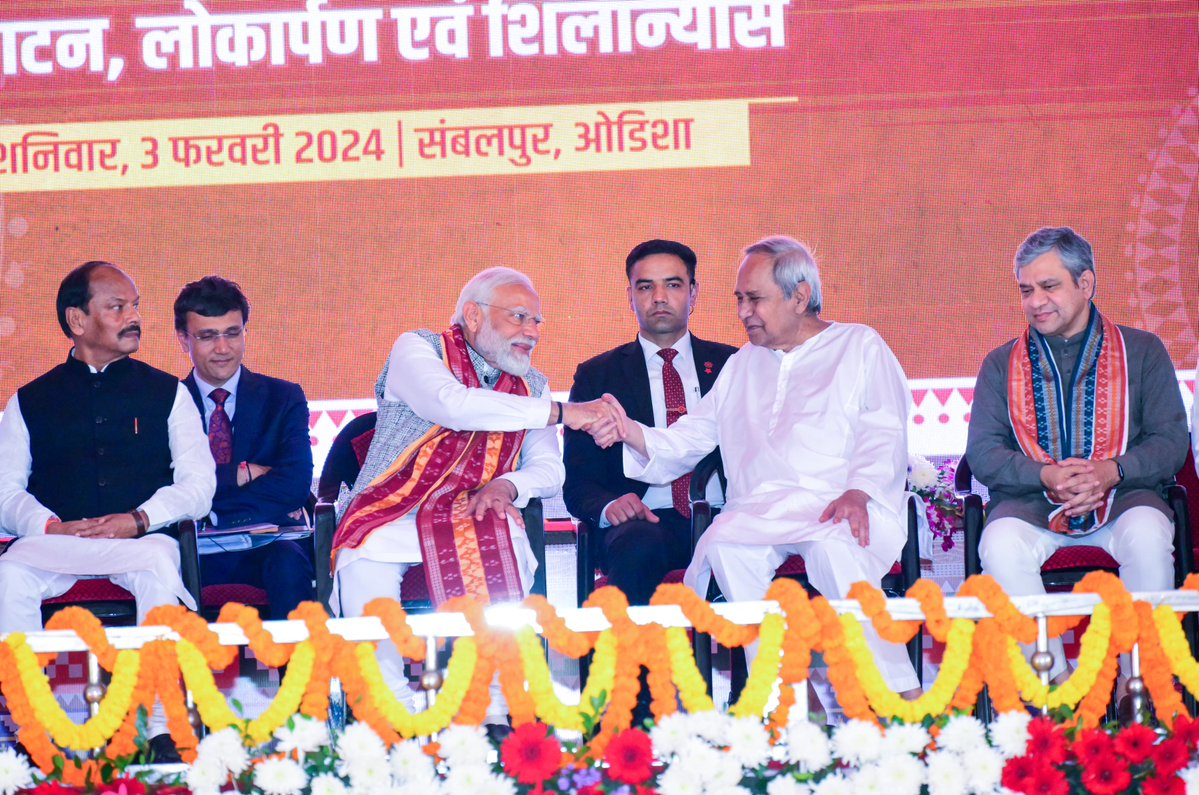
Narendra Modi, Naveen Patnaik shaking hand at the inauguration of IIM Sambalpur campus

== Organisation and administration ==
The university is governed by a board of governors, which include the chairperson, director, twelve board members and secretary. In 2016, Arundhati Bhattacharya, former Chairperson of the State Bank of India, was appointed as the chairperson of the institute in 2016.

== Academics ==
IIM Sambalpur offers various postgraduate diplomas in management. Admission is based on Common Admission Test conducted jointly by the IIMs and on various other processes conducted by IIM Sambalpur.IIM SAMBALPUR also started two new Bachelor's of science programs in data science and artificial intelligence (DSAI)and management and public policy (MPP)

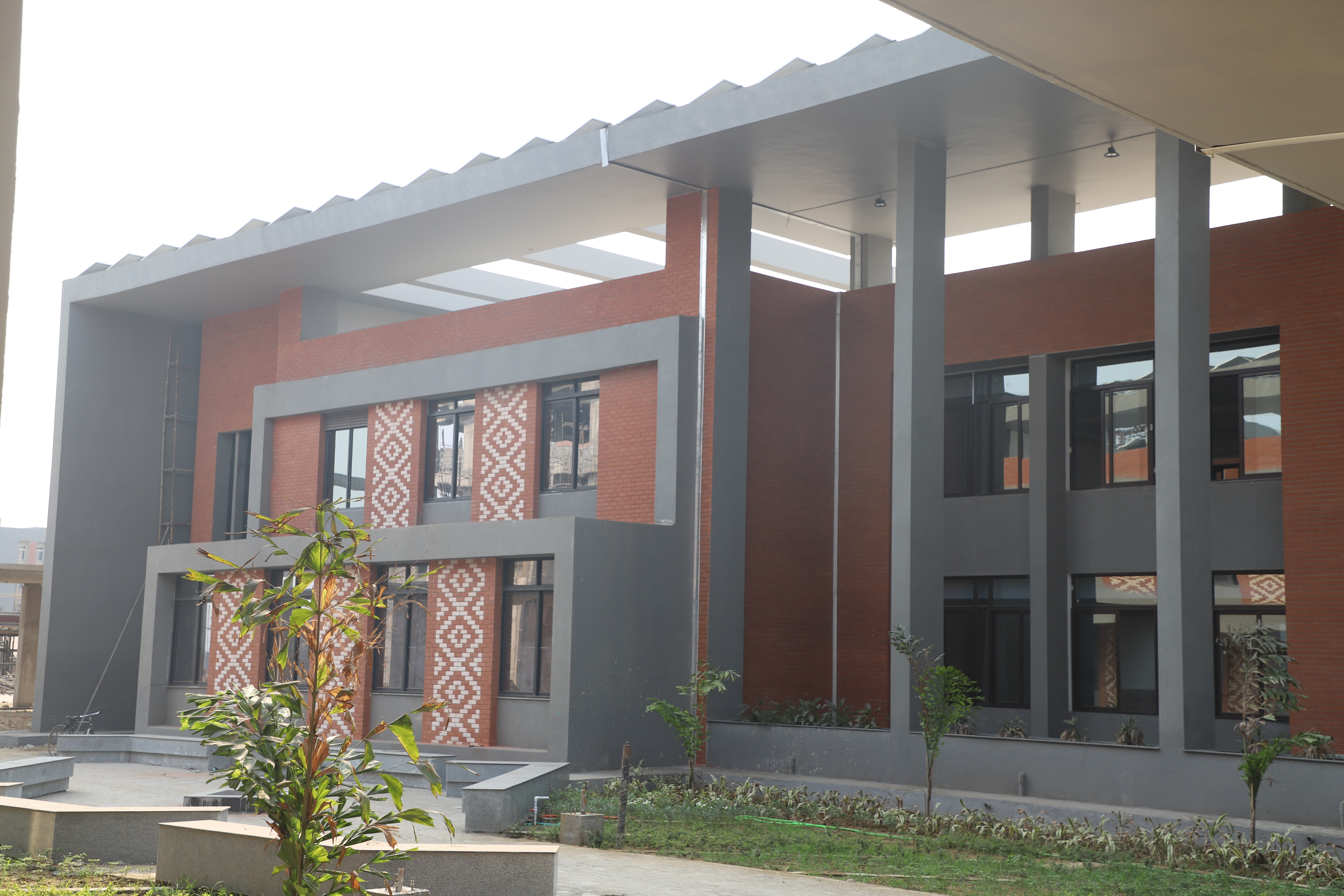
IIM Sambalpur New Campus

Like other IIMs, IIM Sambalpur currently offers master's in management and two undergraduate degrees as per the approval of the Indian Institute of Management Bill, 2017. These include two-year full-time programmes (PGP), one-year full-time residential programme for experienced professionals (PGPX), and also offers Doctor of Business Administration level fellowship programmes. The institute conducts a number of executive education and faculty development programmes.

=== Collaborations ===
IIMSAM has affiliations with Alba Graduate Business School, Greece. The students of IIM Sambalpur who partake in the exchange program would spend an entire trimester at the host University at no additional academic fees. The agreement allows for the exchange of a limited number of students who are selected on the basis of their interests and a screening process. As a first step of the collaboration between the two premier B-Schools, IIM Sambalpur sent two of its students for a four-day Summer B-School program in Athens. The students learned about the Greek economy, Greek philosophy, visited multiple industries and corporate offices and were taken to some of the famous historical sites in Athens.

=== Admission ===
IIM Sambalpur offers different academic programs and has admission processes and eligibility respectively. Its process is based on the course candidate opt for. CAT score is the basic exam to apply for admission in Post graduate program and JEE MAINS and IPMAT INDORE for the BS 4 yrs program of the academic programs. Total seats are further divided into the category where IIM accept admission on the category basis. Good academic record and percentage score is another major aspect.

IIM's also conducts its analytics writing test and personal interview (AWT & PI) in Ahmedabad, Banglore, Hyderabad, Kolkata, & New Delhi cities of selected candidates. Seats in IIMSAM are reserved, based on government instruction 27% of seats are reserved for NC-OBC, 15% for SC, 7.5% for ST candidates, 5% for Persons with Benchmark Disabilities (PwD), and up to 10% for Economically Weaker Sections (EWS).

=== Ranking ===
IIM Sambalpur was ranked 34 among management institutions by the National Institutional Ranking Framework (NIRF) in 2025.

=== Placements ===
The placement process at IIM Sambalpur is a student-driven process that institutionalises placements for the entire batch. The placement Committee elected by the students liaisons between the Institute administration, students and recruiters. Placements for the PGPs are characterised by two phases - summer placements for the first-year batch and final placements for the graduating batch. The summers process is conducted in Nov/Dec for the first yearites. The second year placement committee handles the process for them. The placement process for the graduating is conducted in two stages. The first is the laterals process in January where firms interview students with prior work experience and offer them mid-level managerial positions. The second stage is the final placement process in around February. This process is handled by the newly elected committee among the PGP1s to avoid any conflict of interest and ensure a fair process. Companies from multiple sectors across different geographies hire candidates for a wide range of functions.

== Student life ==
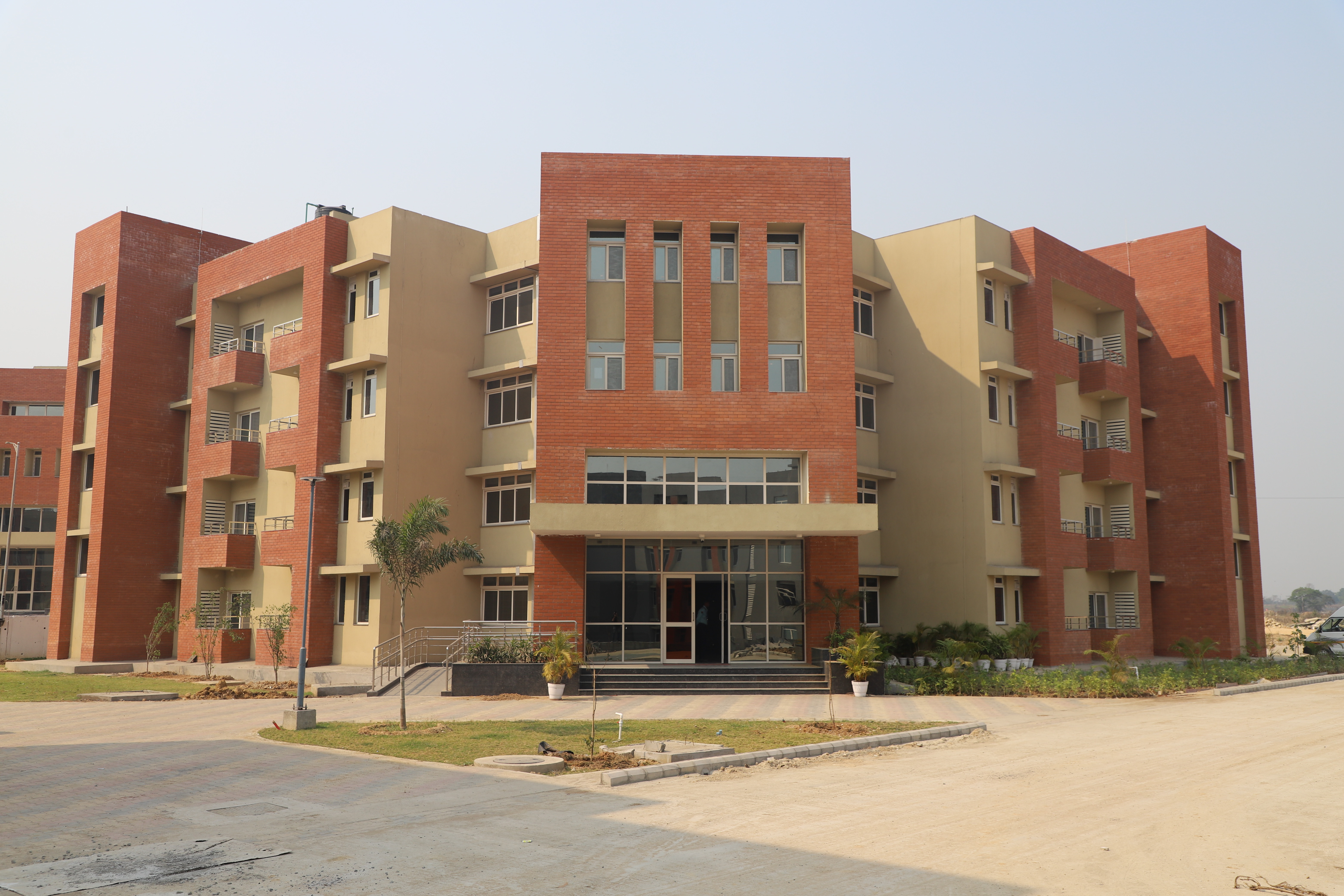
Hostel block of IIM Sambalpur in the permanent campus

=== Accommodation ===
There are three hostel buildings and an annex building taken inside the campus of the institute; two for boys and one for girls. The students of IIM Sambalpur are provided rooms on a twin sharing basis.

The rooms are properly ventilated and well furnished with a bed, almirah, mattress, study-tables and chairs provided to each student. Housekeeping staff maintains the cleanliness of the rooms on a daily basis.

Wi-Fi has been made available which is accessible from anywhere within the campus premises. Each hostel also has a separate common room where a TV and table tennis facilities are installed to cater to the recreational needs of the students.

Currently there's no provision for Married students so they cannot opt to live with their family in hostels. Stay in dormitories is mandatory for students. Basic amenities including washing machines, refrigerators and TVs are available at each dorm.

=== Events ===
The institute organises multiple events each year. Some of the events include Marmagya and Ethos. Marmagya is a two-day annual business conclave organised by the Industry and Alumni Relations Committee. Panel discussions are held on different domains such as marketing, finance and IT/consulting. The theme of Marmagya 2022 was ‘Redefining the business dynamics’.

Ethos is the annual cultural festival of the institute. Its yearly editions have been centred on themes like diversity, colour or going green. Other events such as Ballyhoo Street, Ad selfie etc. are organised under Ethos.

== Controversies ==
In the academic year 2018–19, the institute increased its intake capacity from 60 to 120 students. Since the institute operates from a temporary campus, it failed to arrange hostels for the students, and there were 111 students. Due to a lack of accommodation, 12 students were forced to leave the institute, and the strength of the 4th batch decreased from 111 to 99. The institute director, Mahadeo Jaiswal, alleged that the Government of Odisha had allotted three hostel buildings. Still, Sambalpur University provided only two after the Memorandum of Understanding was signed.

== See also ==
- List of MBA schools in India
