= JRD Tata Jubilee Park =

Park in Odisha, India

- Park
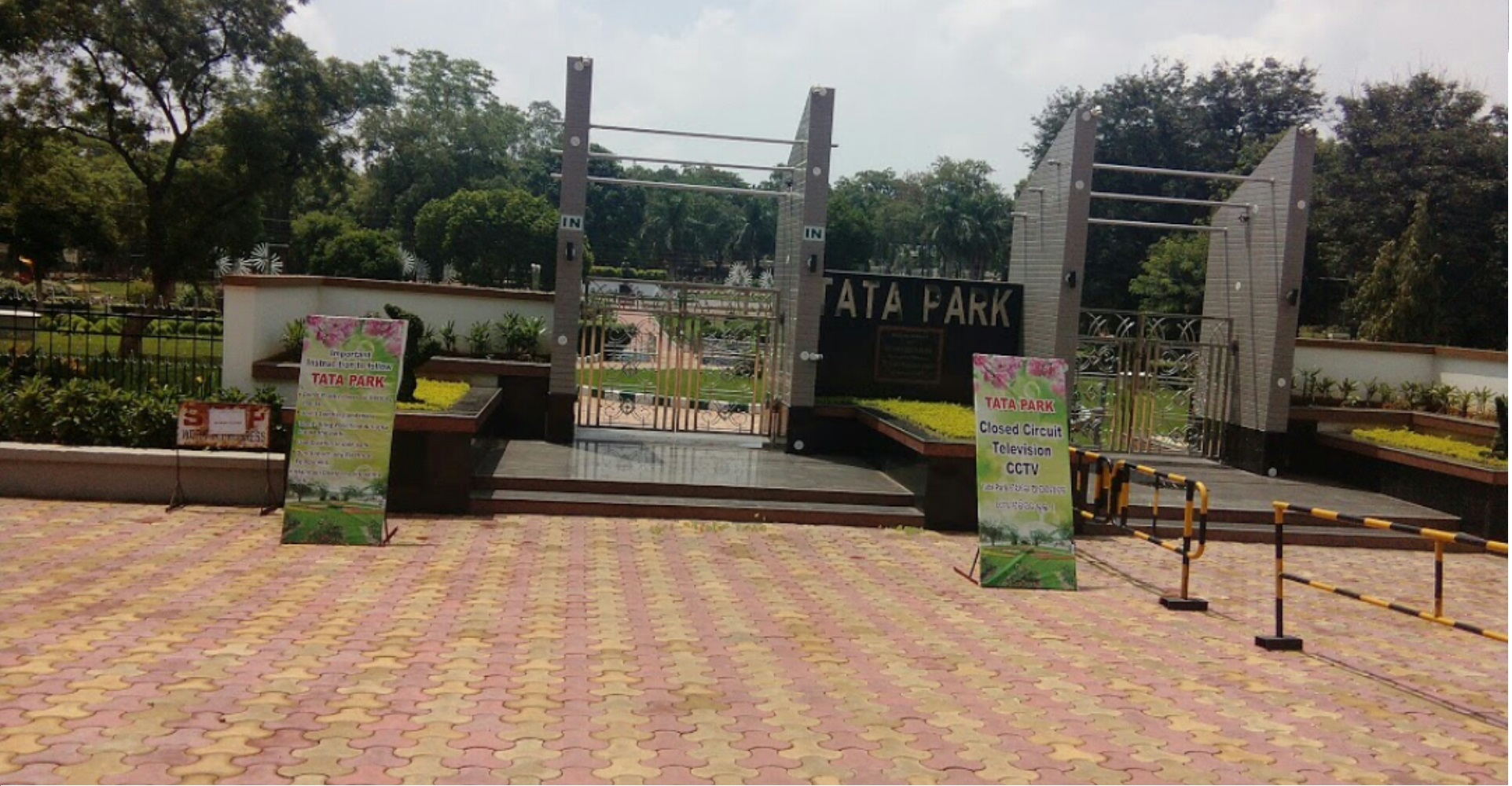
- main entrance gate

- Location in Odisha, India JRD Tata Jubilee Park (India)
- Coordinates: 21.80167°N 83.86389°E
- Country: India
- State: Odisha
- District: Jharsuguda
- Established: 3 March 2017
- Time zone: UTC+5:30 (IST)

JRD Tata Jubilee Park is located in the heart of the Gumadera area in the Belpahar city of Jharsuguda district of Odisha, India. The park contains a wide collection of aromatic and beautiful flowers which add a sense of calmness and peace to the environment.

== History ==
JRD Tata Jubilee Park or Tata Park, Belpahar was formerly named as Jubilee Park. It signifies the importance and memories of JRD Tata. On 3 March 2017, the Park was again renewed and inaugurated by Mr. Priyabrata Panda, managing director of TRL Krosaki Refractories Limited.

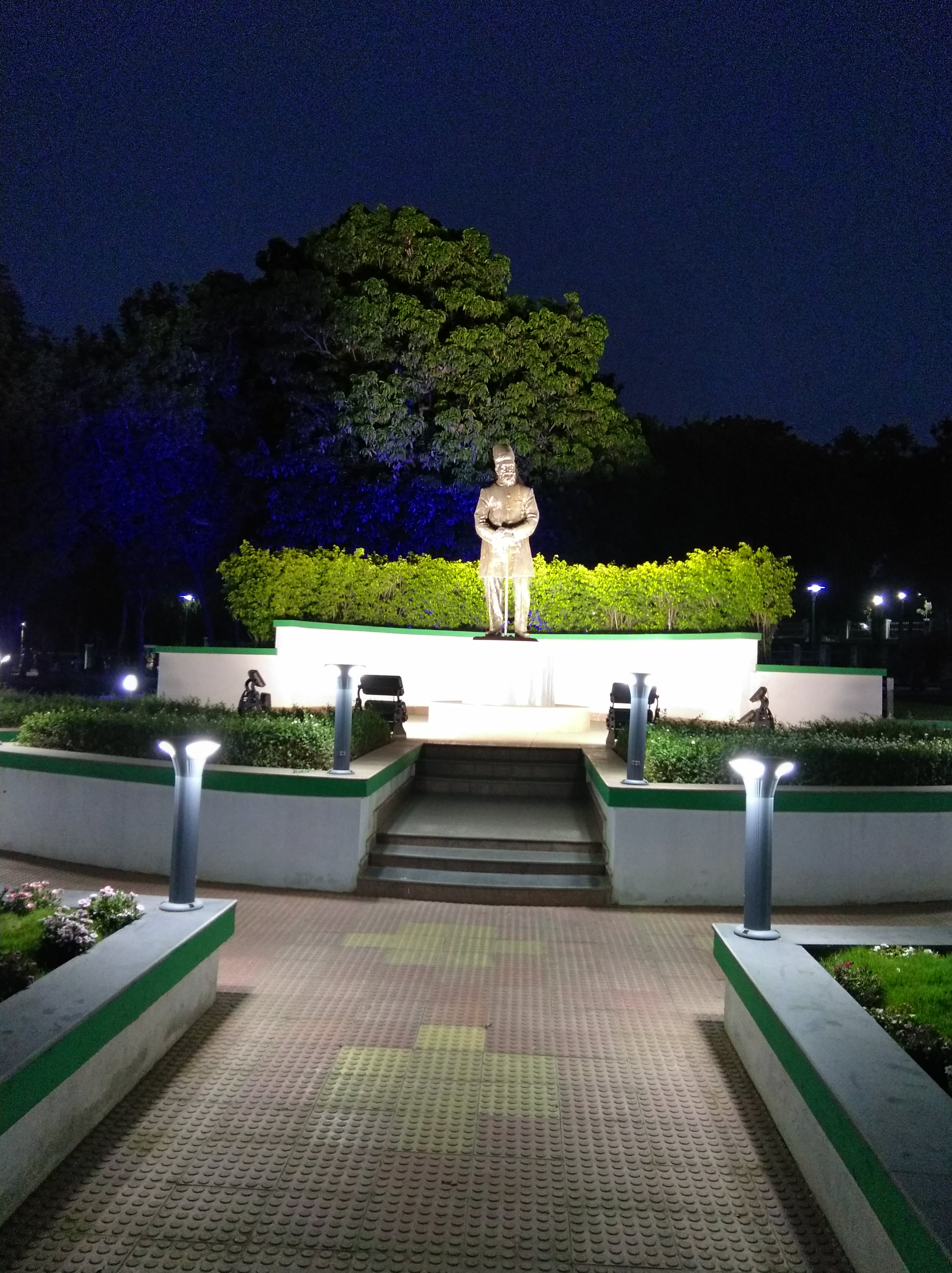
Statue of JRD Tata

== Main Attraction ==
Tata Park has led to great attraction during its open timings. People from far distances come here to spend times with their family and their friends. There are fitness centers, small gym equipment, child games. Its water fountain, fish pond and musical path attract a large number of visitors especially in the evening timing. In the morning, people come here for jogging as well as performing yoga and other exercises. The central statue of JRD Tata adds to the beauty of the park. Along with it lightning and nice surrounding are other advantages.

== Features ==
The public park features seating areas, children's play equipment, and a stream-fed pond inhabited by fish, turtles, and ducks. Security is maintained through on-site guards and CCTV surveillance. Admission is free, and parking facilities are available for visitors.

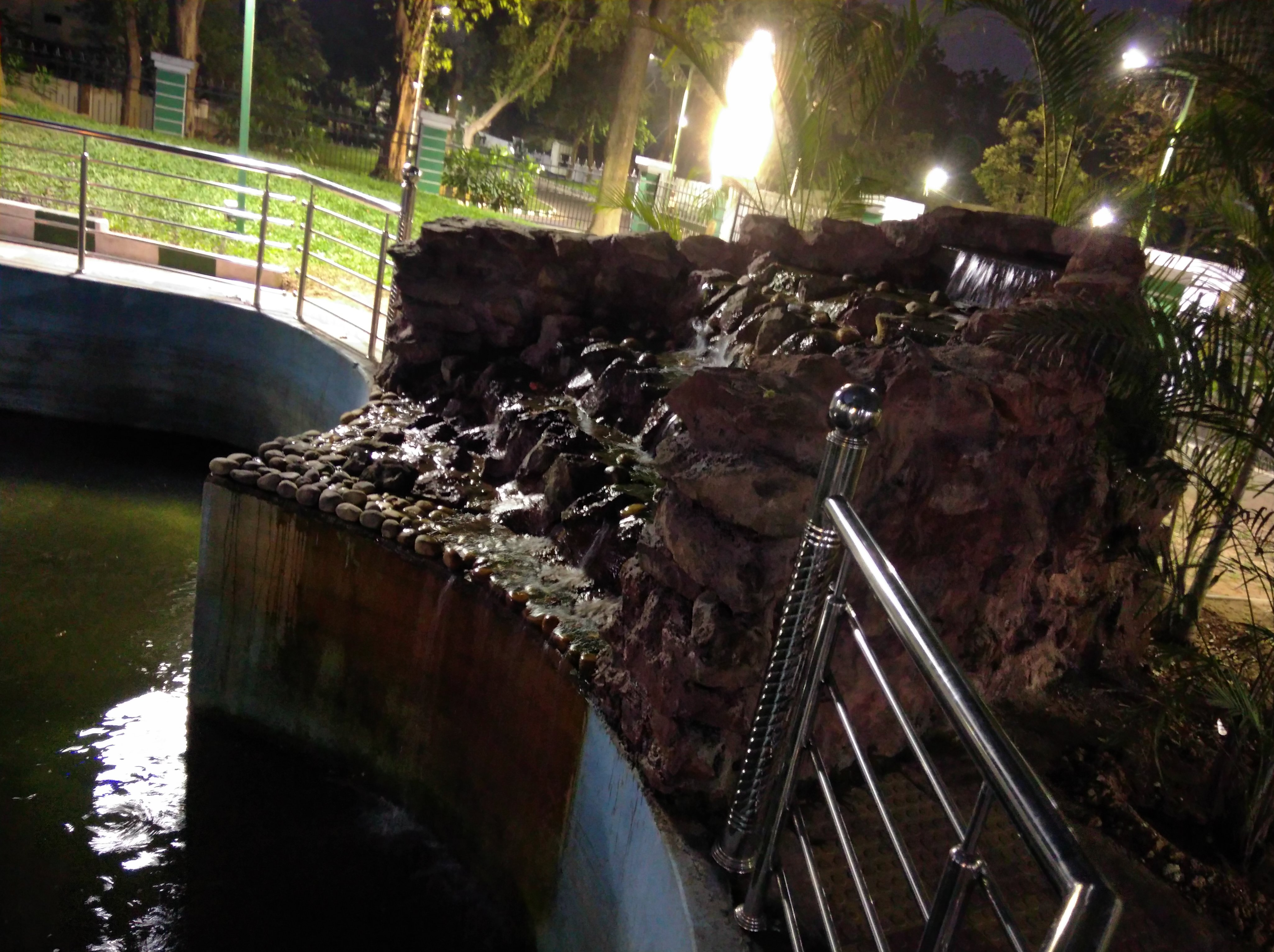
Stream like water flow to fish pond

== Connectivity ==
The park is well connected by road transport, due to which it is easily accessible.

== Images ==
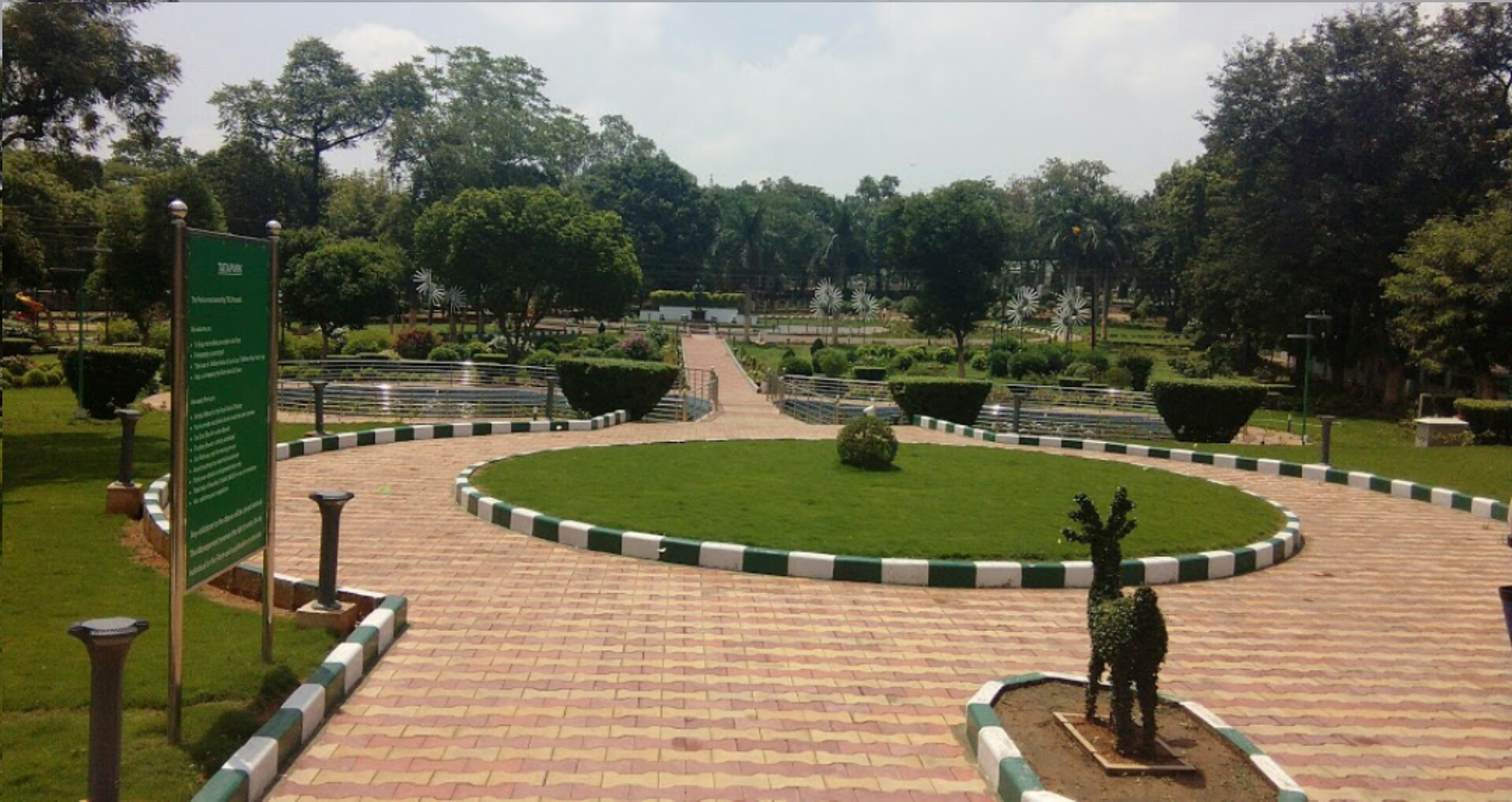
The inside view of the park

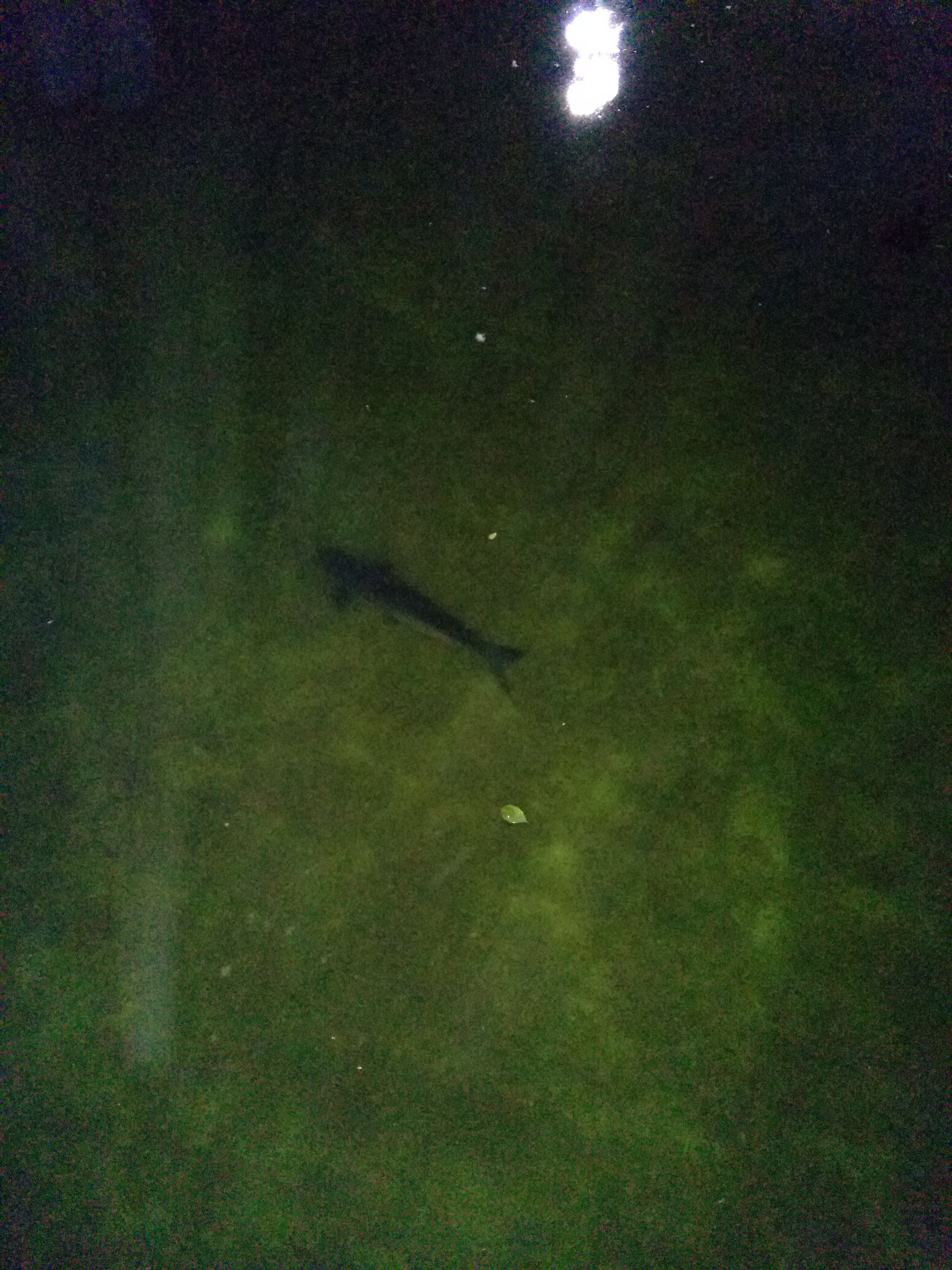
Fish in the fish pond

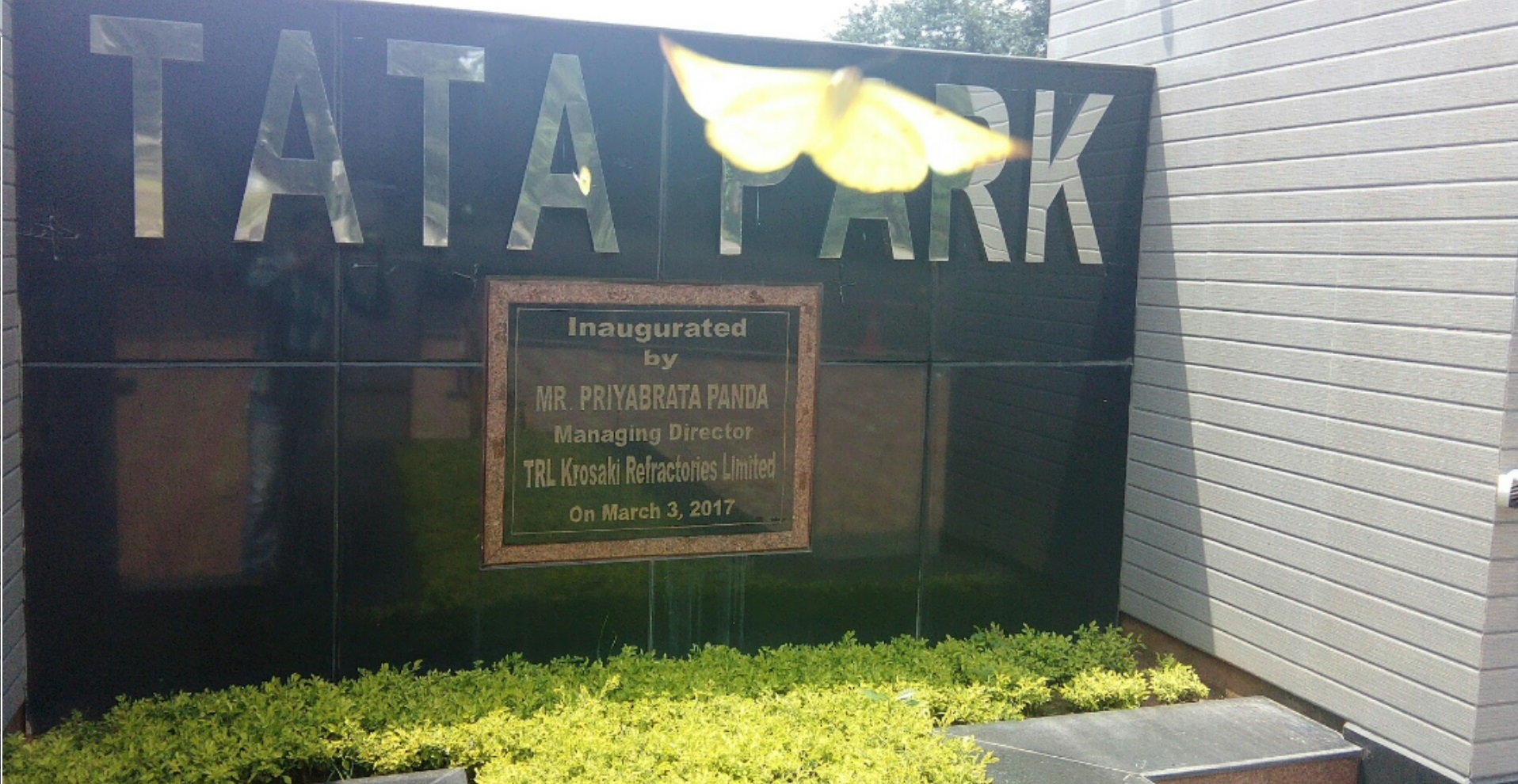
The foundation stone

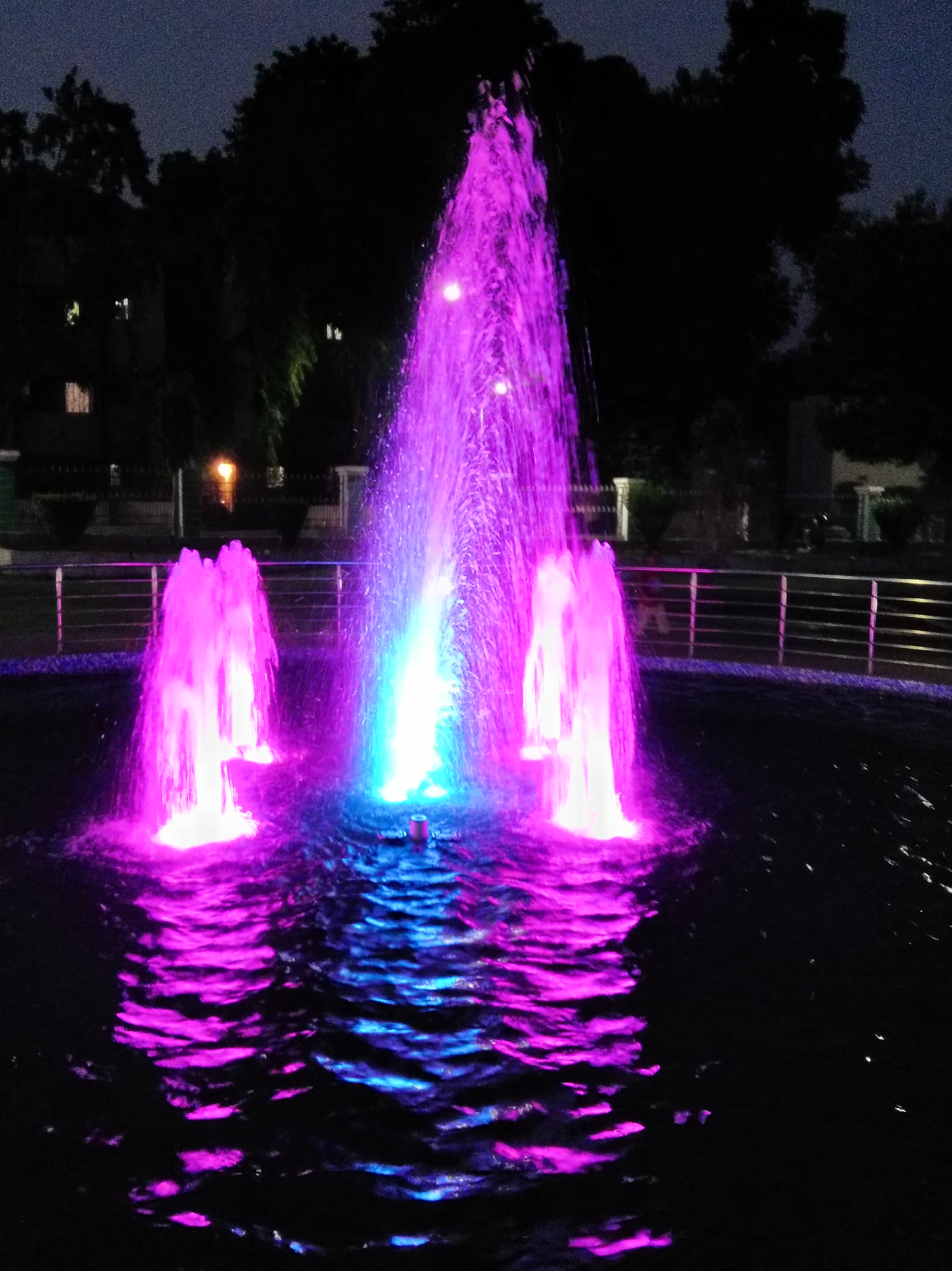
The water fountain inside the park

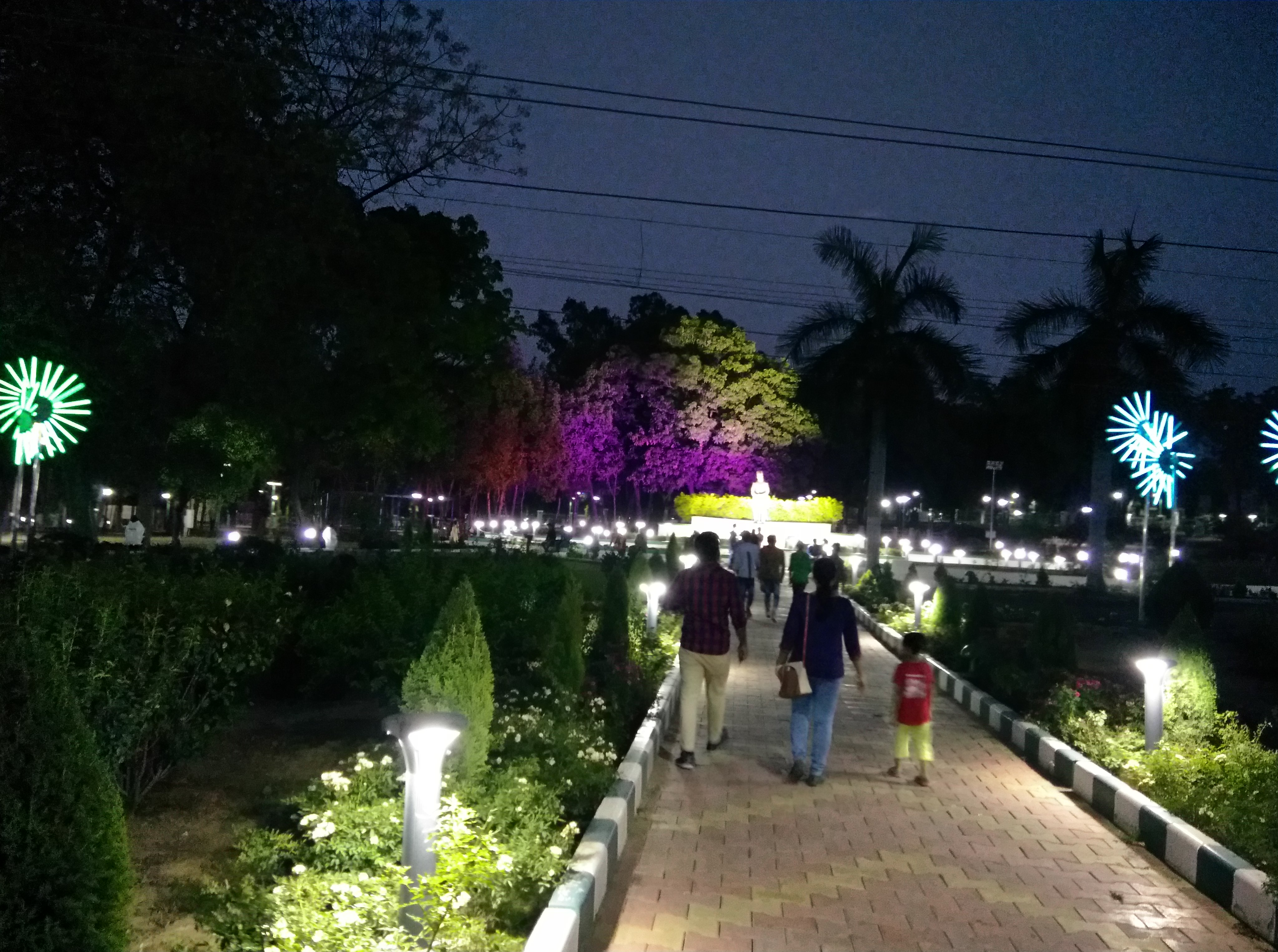
Night view of the musical path
