= List of colleges affiliated to the Sambalpur University =

Affiliated colleges with Sambalpur University, Odisha

There are about 200+ colleges affiliated to Sambalpur University excluding four other colleges Nababharat Shiksha Parishad, SLB Medical College, Sardar Raza's Medical College and Sarala Nursing College with totalling more than 200 colleges.

Colleges that are affiliated to Sambalpur University are from the district of Sundargarh, Deogarh, Jharsuguda, Sambalpur, Bargarh, Boudh, Athmallik Sub-Division of Angul include:-

Name	Location
Athmallik +3 Degree College, Athmallik, Angul	Angul (Athmallik)
Janata College, Boinda, Angul	Angul (Athmallik)
Kishorenagar +3 Degree College, Kishorenagar, Angul	Angul (Athmallik)
Kishorenagar Higher Secondary School, Kishorenagar, Angul	Angul (Athmallik)
Athmallik Higher Secondary School, Athmallik, Angul	Angul (Athmallik)
Solapada +3 Degree Mahavidyalaya, Thakurgarh, Angul	Angul (Athmallik)
+3 Kashi Bishwanath M.V. paiksahi, Athmallik	Angul (Athmallik)
+3 Degree College, Tora, Bargarh	Bargarh
Anchal College, Padampur, Bargarh	Bargarh
Anchalik Kishan College, Bheden, Bargarh	Bargarh
Barpali College, Barpali, Bargarh	Bargarh
Bijepur College, Bijepur, Bargarh	Bargarh
Dadhibaman College, Bhatli, Bargarh	Bargarh
Ghess College, Ghess, Bargarh	Bargarh
Imperial College, Bargarh	Bargarh
Katapali College, Katapali, Bargarh	Bargarh
Larambha College, Larambha, Bargarh	Bargarh
Mahata Gandhi Degree College, Bhukta, Bargarh	Bargarh
Mandosil College, Mandosil, Bargarh	Bargarh
Pallishree College, Chichinda, Bargarh	Bargarh
Attabira College, Attabira, Bargarh	Bargarh
Panchyat College, Bargarh	Bargarh
Panchayat Samiti College, Gaisilate, Bargarh	Bargarh
Panchayat Samiti College, Jharbandh, Bargarh	Bargarh
Remunda College, Remunda, Bargarh	Bargarh
Shakuntala Bidyadhar Women's Degree College, Kamgaon, Bargarh	Bargarh
Sohela College, Sohela, Bargarh	Bargarh
Sri Nrusinghanath Ayurvedic College, Paikmal, Bargarh	Bargarh
Trust Fund College, Bargarh	Bargarh
Vindhya Vasini College, Nursinghnath, Bargarh	Bargarh
Women's College, Bargarh	Bargarh
Women's College, Padampur, Bargarh	Bargarh
Katapali +3 College, Barpali -Katapali, Bargarh	Bargarh
Vikash School of Business Management, Bargarh (waiting affiliation)	Bargarh
Bhairabi College, Purunakataka	Boudh
Boudh Panchyat college, Boudh	Boudh
Maa Maheswari College, Baunsuni, Boudh	Boudh
Panchayat Samiti College, Kantamal, Boudh	Boudh
Deogarh College, Deogarh	Deogarh
Ekalabya Panchayat Samiti College, Kansar, Deogarh	Deogarh
Panchayat Samiti Snatak Mahavidyalaya, Barkot, Deogarh	Deogarh
Panchayat Samiti College (+3)Budhapal, Reamal, Deogarh	Deogarh
Palsama Science College, Palsama, Deogarh	Deogarh
+3 Panchyat College, Kalla, Deogarh	Deogarh
Reamal College, Reamal Deogarh	Deogarh
Model Degree College, Deogarh	Deogarh
+3 Degree Women's College, Deogarh	Deogarh
Belpahar College, Belpahar, Jharsuguda	Jharsuguda
Brajrajnagar College, Brajrajnagar, Jharsuguda	Jharsuguda
Draupadi Institute of Educational Technology, Sunarimunda, Jharsuguda	Jharsuguda
Laxmi Narayan College, Jharsuguda	Jharsuguda
Mahima Degree College, Bijaapali, Panchagaon, Jharsuguda	Jharsuguda
Pradosh Kumar Smruti Smaraki College, H.Katapali Jharsuguda	Jharsuguda
Panchayat Anchalik Mahavidyalaya, Kumarbandh, Jharsuguda	Jharsuguda
Panchayat Samiti College, Kolabira, Jharsuguda	Jharsuguda
Panchayat Samiti College, Laikera, Jharsuguda	Jharsuguda
Sovan Memorial Panchayat College, Kirmira, Jharsuguda	Jharsuguda
Women's College, Jharsuguda	Jharsuguda
Sarala Nursing College, Jharsuguda (Noc)	Jharsuguda
Bamra Trust Fund College, Bamra, Sambalpur	Sambalpur
Basudev Godabari Degree College, Kesaibahal	Sambalpur
Bhima Bhoi College, Rairakhol	Sambalpur
Burla College, Burla, Sambalpur	Sambalpur
Charles Babbage College of Information Technology, Sambalpur	Sambalpur
Dutika Sahu College, Laida, Sambalpur	Sambalpur
Dr.Jhasketan Sahu College, Parmanpur, Sambalpur	Sambalpur
Dr.Parshuram Mishra Institute of Advanced Studies in Education, Sambalpur	Sambalpur
Gram Panchayat Rural College, Kuntara, Sambalpur	Sambalpur
Government College of Physical Education, Kulundi, Sambalpur	Sambalpur
Government Women's College, Sambalpur	Sambalpur
Hirakud College, Hirakud, Sambalpur	Sambalpur
Jamankira College, Jamankira, Sambalpur	Sambalpur
Kuchinda College, Kuchinda, Sambalpur	Sambalpur
Lajpat Rai Law College	Sambalpur
Maa Jhadeswari College, Dhama, Sambalpur	Sambalpur
Naktideul College, Naktideul, Sambalpur	Sambalpur
Netajee Subhas Chandra Bose College, Sambalpur	Sambalpur
Orissa Medical College of Homopathy and Research, Sambalpur	Sambalpur
Parbatigiri College, Mahulpali, Phuljharan, Sambalpur	Sambalpur
Sambalpur Nursing College, Dhanupali, Sambalpur	Sambalpur
Saraswat Mahavidyalaya Godbhaga, Sambalpur	Sambalpur
Surajmal College, Rampella, Sambalpur	Sambalpur
Veer Surendra Sai Medical College, Burla, Sambalpur	Sambalpur
Asian Workers’ Development Institute, Rourkela, Sundargarh	Sundargarh
Anchalik Sahojog Degree College, Subdega	Sundargarh
Bonaigarh College, Bonaigarh	Sundargarh
College of Arts, Sc.& Tech. Bandamunda, Sundargh	Sundargarh
Dalmia College, Rajgangpur, Sundargarh	Sundargarh
Dr Ambedkar Memorial Institute of Information Technology and Management Studies, Jagda, Rourkela	Sundargarh
Gandhi Mahavidyalaya, Deogaon, Rourkela, Sundargarh	Sundargarh
Government College, Rourkela, Sundargarh	Sundargarh
Government College, Sundargarh	Sundargarh
Government Women's College, Sundargarh	Sundargarh
Hrushikesh Ray Mahavidyalaya, Rourkela, Sundargarh	Sundargarh
Ila Memorial Panchayat Samiti Degree College, Kinjirma, Sundargarh	Sundargarh
Ispat College, Rourkela, Sundargarh	Sundargarh
Jadupati +3 Degree college, Sihidia, Sundargarh	Sundargarh
Jasoda Bishnu College, Sardhapali, Sundargarh	Sundargarh
Kalyani Ray Mahavidyalaya Rourkela, Sundargarh	Sundargarh
Kinjirkela College, Kinjirkela, Sundargarh	Sundargarh
Lahunipada College, Lahunipada, Sundargarh	Sundargarh
Lephripada College, Lephripada, Sundargarh	Sundargarh
Maharshi Dayananda Mahavidyala, Garh-Mahulpali, Sundargarh	Sundargarh
Manikeswari College, Garhtumulia, Sundargarh	Sundargarh
Neelashaila Mahavidyalaya Jhirpani, Rourkela, Sundargharh	Sundargarh
Panchayat Samiti Degree College, Bargaon, Sundargarh	Sundargarh
Panchayat Samiti Degree College, Bhedabhahal, Sundargarh	Sundargarh
Priyadarshini Mahila Mahavidyalaya, Jalda, Sundargarh	Sundargarh
Rourkela Institute of Management Studies, Rourkela, Sundargarh	Sundargarh
Rourkela College, Rourkela, Sundargarh	Sundargarh
Rourkela College of Teacher Educational Training, Rourkela, Sundargarh	Sundargarh
Municipal College, Rourkela, Sundargarh	Sundargarh
Sarbati Devi Women's College, Rajgangpur, Sundargarh	Sundargarh
Sushilabati Government Women's College Rourkela, Sundargarh	Sundargarh
Shrama Shakti College, Biramitrapur, Sundargarh	Sundargarh
S.R.D.M.N. Panchyat College, Sargipali, Sundargarh	Sundargarh
Subodh Ray Mahavidyalaya, Bisra, Rourkela	Sundargarh
Utkalmani Homoeopathic Medical College, Rourkela, Sundargarh	Sundargarh
Vedvyas Mahavidyalaya, Rourkela, Sundargarh	Sundargarh
Vesaja Patel College, Duduka, Sundargarh	Sundargarh
Hi-Tech Medical College, Rourkela (New college)	Sundargarh
+3 Women's College, Kantabanji	Sundargarh
