= Laxminarayan Mishra =

Freedom fighter and Indian Revolutionary leader

Pandit Laxminarayan Mishra
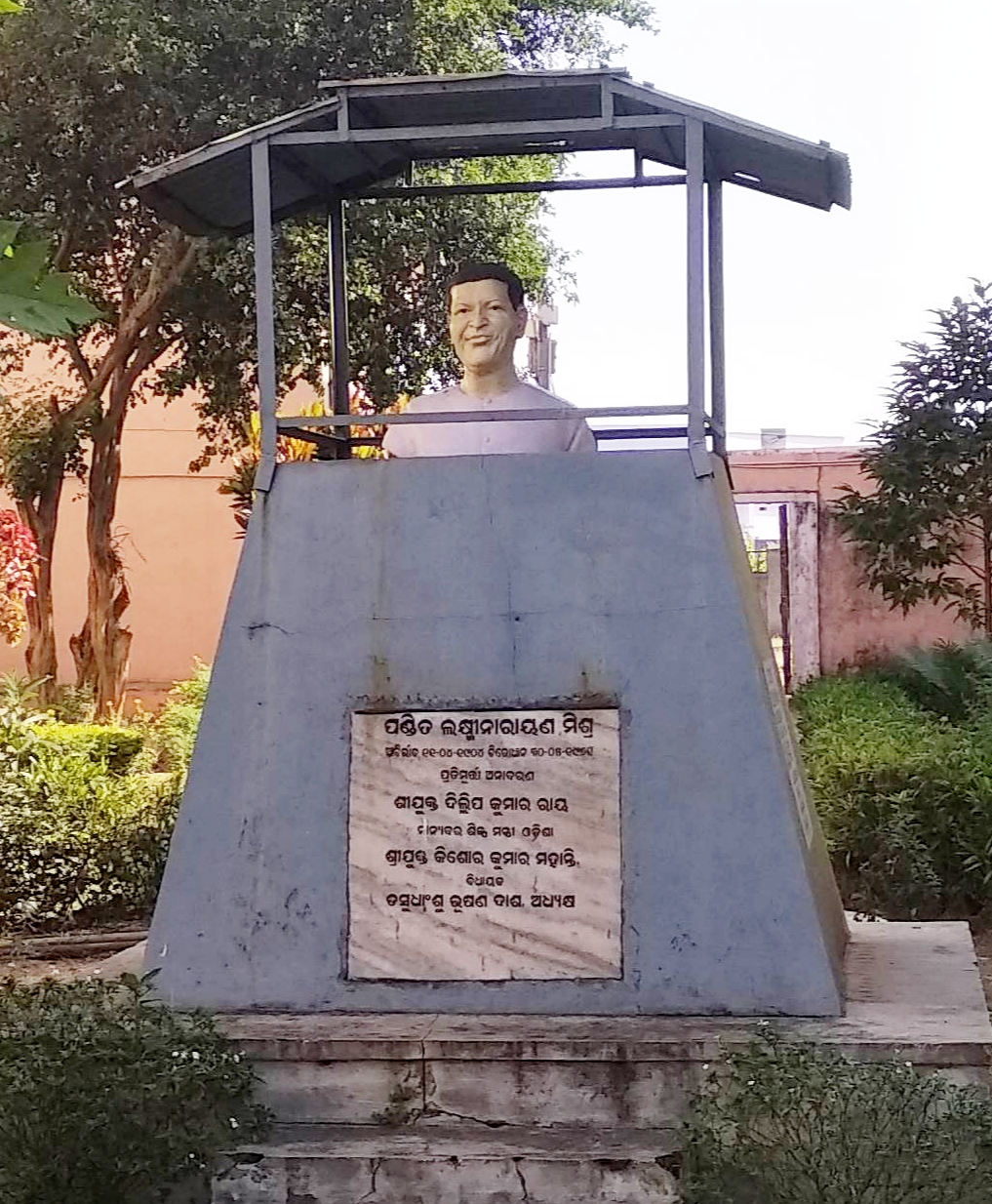
- Statue of Laxminarayan Mishra at Laxminarayan College, Jharsuguda
- Born: Laxminarayan Mishra; 11 April 1904; Nandapada, Sambalpur, Bengal Presidency, India
- Died: 30 May 1961 (aged 57); Jharsuguda, Odisha, India
- Cause of death: Assassination (stabbing)
- Occupations: Freedom fighter, politician, educationist, social reformer, writer
- Years active: 1919-1961
- Known for: Indian Independence Movement, Quit India movement, Non cooperation movement
- Political party: Indian National Congress
- Parent(s): Krupasindhu Mishra (father), Revati Devi (mother)
- Relatives: House of Mishras of Sambalpur: Sangamitra Mishra (daughter); Shibananda Mishra (grandson); Dr Satyajit Mishra (grandson); Gayatri Mishra (granddaughter); Satyakam Mishra (great-grandson); Stuti Mishra (great-granddaughter); Swasti Dash (great-granddaughter); Smriti Mishra (great-granddaughter)

Pandit Laxminarayan Mishra (11 April 1904 – 30 May 1961) was an Indian Nationalist, educationist, politician and writer from Odisha, India. He was one of the most active nationalists of Western Odisha. Being a staunch nationalist and a follower of the Indian Independence movement, he left school and joined the movement. He spent his years preaching ideas of revolution and in time was spent 17 years in prison. In prison he spent a considerable amount time learning many languages such as Gujarati, Persian, and Urdu, as well as religious readings. This earned him the title of Pandit from many other freedom fighters. His descendants live in Sambalpur.

Mishra was born in 1904 to Krupasindhu Mishra and Revati Devi who were Hindu Brahmins. He spent his childhood in Nandapada, Sambalpur. He attended Gurupada Primary school and later went to Zilla School, Sambalpur. At Zilla school at 10th standard, he with his friends left school and joined the independence movement. They were responsible for spreading and preaching the movement in many parts of Odisha. He also performed a protest against the visit of the crown prince of England to India on 17 December 1921 for which he was arrested on 31 March 1922 for his activities and was fined Rs 50. But on his refusal to pay a fine he was sentenced to one month imprisonment. In 1930, he joined the Salt Satyagraha and Civil Disobedience Movement on whose leadership the tricolor flag was hoisted in Sambalpur schools. Although he was not formally educated, he was a prolific writer on religion and literature.

== Early life ==
Mishra was born in the undivided Sambalpur District in the British Raj (present Sambalpur District) of the Odisha state in India on 11 April 1904. He was the third son of Krupasindhu Mishra and Revati Devi. Mishra was from a middle-class Brahmin family and went to Gurupada primary school and C.B.S Zilla school in Sambalpur where he was a good student. But in January 1921, after being inspired by Gandhi’s call for boycott of government school, he held a meeting with his schoolmates at the Budharaja foothill on 2 January 1921 where the students decided to boycott the government school where they studied. Accordingly, Laxminarayan left the Zillah school when he was in class X along with Nrusingha Guru, Bhawani Shankar Mishra, Krutartha Acharya and Abdul Majid which created a sensation in national medias, as they were the first in the country to boycott government owned High School which was followed by others in India.

== Indian Independence Movement ==
He and his school friends organized the ‘hartal’ in the town which spread to other parts of the district. Thereafter they toured to different villages to spread the message of non-cooperation and charkha and were able to enroll 2,800 satyagrahis to carry on satyagraha. Besides Charkha, Laxmi Narayan was particularly preaching for giving up alcohol, withdrawal from government schools and colleges, dissociation from courts and amicable settlements of disputes in panchayat level. He also successfully organized a protest meeting against the visit of the crown prince of England to India on 17 December 1921. He was arrested on 31 March 1922 for his activities and was fined Rs 50. But on his refusal to pay a fine he was sentenced to one month imprisonment.

In 1930, he joined the Salt Satyagraha and Civil Disobedience Movement on whose leadership the tricolor flag was hoisted in Sambalpur schools. In spite of the prohibitory order, he organized a meeting and 'hartal' in protest against the salt policy of the government and was arrested and sent to Hazaribagh jail in 1931. After his release in 1934, he was accorded a heroic reception in Sambalpur. During this time, he joined the Harijan uplift programme by visiting their localities, cleaning them and arranging drinking water by digging wells there. He started a night school for them and was also able to get sanctioned Rs 728 for them from provincial Harijan Sangha for the development of their localities. It was at his initiatives in March 1938 an Exhibition of Charkha was held at the village Talpatia and resolutions were passed to remove untouchability between different classes of the Harijans, to open a cotton Depot at Talpatia, to move the Government to include the Harijans amongst the panchas etc.

In 1937, the district witnessed celebrations to commemorate the release of the veteran freedom fighter Laxminarayan Misra from prison. Misra had been imprisoned for his participation in anti-imperialist activities.

He was imprisoned for his revolutionary activities. Mishra's release was met with great enthusiasm and celebration especially among the people of Puri. On 3 August 1937, a meeting was organized at the Simha dwara in Puri to welcome Misra. The meeting was presided over by Acharya Harihara Das and attended by a large number of people. In his address, Das urged the people to work actively towards the country's independence and well-being. The next day, on 4 August, Biswanath Das, another prominent freedom fighter, arranged a reception for Misra at Puri. Congress leaders also organized a meeting in his honour in the following days, which was attended by many people. In his speech, Mishra called for the establishment of communal unity among the people.

Mishra was an active nationalist in Western Odisha. He was imprisoned for seventeen years for his role in the independence movement. While in jail he studied religion, culture and political thought.

He was involved in moments such as the non-corporation movement, drive against untouchability, the Nagpur flag march, move against the partial exclusion of the district of Sambalpur, the struggle against the zamindars and the state rulers, and the quit India movement. He also aroused the people to fight against the oppressive zamindars and rulers of the princely states by joining their movements. Under his inspiration the people of Padampur and Khariar estates decided not to cooperate with government officials.

During the Quit India Movement in 1942, he was arrested after his return to Sambalpur from the AICC session which evoked protest in the town.

As a staunch revolutionary he very often said, 'Revolution is my profession'. He had spent about seventeen years in jail. But prison life provided him the opportunity to read and learn which made him a good writer. Besides Odia and English, he had also learnt Bengali, Sanskrit, Urdu, Hindi and Telugu. He was assassinated in 1971. Mishra spoke Odia, Sanskrit, Urdu, Bengali, Telugu, Hindi, and English.

== Death ==
In the midterm elections of 1961, Mishra delivered his last public speech at Jhanda Chhak, Jharsuguda. He then departed for Bhilai near Raipur from Jharsuguda station where he was to deliver a talk in the Rabindra Centenary Celebrations. However, he was assassinated there. After his stabbing, he was transported to the nearby hospital where he was declared dead.

== Ideology ==
Pandit Laxminarayan Mishra was an anti-colonial and nationalist leader who believed in full independence from the English crown. He also thought of equal rights to the minority groups and wanted social stigma to be abolished.

== Personal life ==
Mishra spent his life reading literature and was a prolific reader of and often quoted Indian authors such as Rabindranath Tagore and Gangadhar Meher. Although he was not formally educated, he was a reputed author whose books were used in many universities in the Indian subcontinent. He often spent his time reading many Hindu texts such as the Bhagavat Gita. He also spent a considerable amount of his time both pre- and post-independence attending many social ceremonies.

== Mishras of Sambalpur ==
Laxminarayan Mishra was born into a Brahmin Family in Nandapada, Sambalpur. His daughter Sangamitra Mishra married into the wealthy House of Mishras of Sambalpur who traditionally held the title of Zamindari in the Athmallik State since the 1890s. Her Husband, the 4th Zamindar of Kalamati and Aida- Rajendra Prasad Mishra moved to Sambalpur later where the family resides today. The Zamindari of Kalamati worked autonomously by the end of the 19th century and some lost records even write them as “Prince” of Kalamati and Aida. Thus the title today is roughly “Prince of Kalamati and Aida” although the local variant Zamindar is also used by the locals. As per genealogical records, Rishi Mishra was the last hereditary prince of Kalamati-Aida before 1947 after which the title became ceremonial and continued to be used locally today. Satyakam Mishra is the next in line to hold the title of “Prince/Zamindar of Kalamati-Aida”

=== House of Mishras of Sambalpur ===
Mishra Family (1870s-present)
- Pandit Laxminarayan Mishra (1904-1961) m. Kamala Mishra (1910s-1970s)
  - Sangamitra Mishra (1930s–2022) m. Rajendra Prasad Mishra (1930s-2019)- Zamindar/Honorary Prince in Athmallik state, Zamindari extends upto 1870s acc to sources
    - Shibananda Mishra m. Jaswini Mishra
      - Smriti Mishra (2015–present)
    - Dr Satyajit Mishra m. Dr Monica Nanda
      - Stuti Mishra (2002–present)
      - Satyakam Mishra (2006–present)- current heir to the Zamindari as per male primogeniture
    - Gayatri Dash m. Sanjay Dash
      - Swasti Dash (2003–present)

== Honours ==
He has been honored as the namesake of various institutions, including Laxminarayan College, Jharsuguda.

His statue is near the GM University, Sambalpur.

He has been honoured by many rewards posthumously

His biography was written in Odia by his daughter Sangamitra Mishra.
