= Koilighugar Waterfall =

Koilighuar Waterfall କୋଇଲି ଘୋଘର ଜଳପ୍ରପାତ
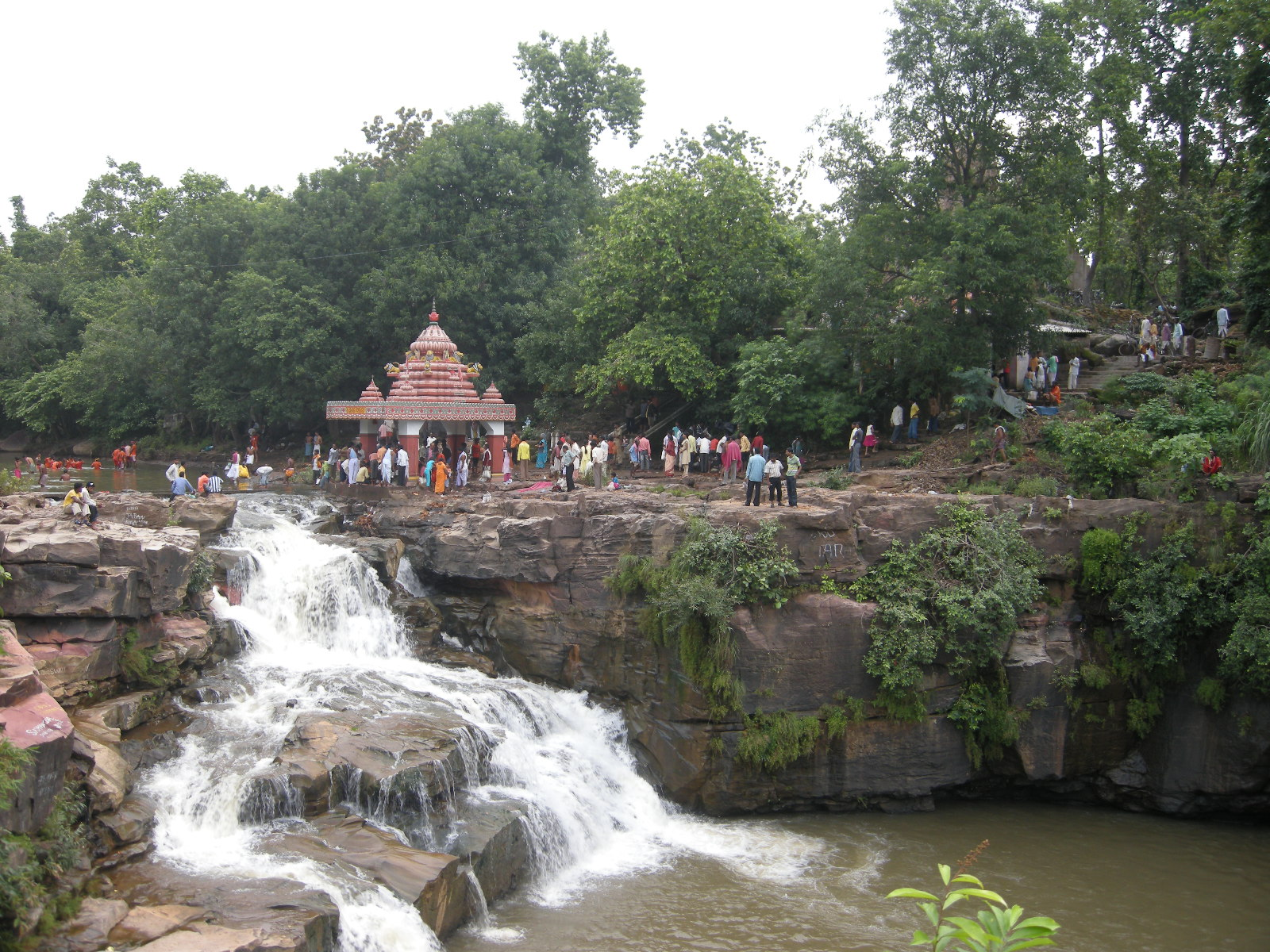
- Interactive map of Koilighuar Waterfall କୋଇଲି ଘୋଘର ଜଳପ୍ରପାତ
- Location: Jharsuguda district, Odisha, India
- Coordinates: 21.806311°N 83.668752°E
- Total height: 200 ft (61 m)
- Number of drops: 1
- Watercourse: Ahiraj

Koilighugar Waterfall is in Jharsuguda district, Odisha, India.

== Location ==
From Gobindpur Chowk in National Highway 49, which is between Jharsuguda and Raigarh, take a right turn. A 6 km (3.7 mi) drive from there through thick śāl and mahua forests will take one to Koilighugar Waterfall. Gobindpur is 20 km (12 mi) from Belpahar.

== Places of interest ==
The Koilighugar Waterfall, around 200 ft (61 m) in height, is in Lakhanpur, near the village Kushmelbahal. The waterfall is in a rivulet named Ahiraj which originates from the 'Chhuikhanch' forest. After the waterfall, the rivulet flows westwards to merge into the Mahanadi river. It is a picturesque beauty spot with its sylvan backdrop.

Inside the fall there is a Shivalingam known as Maheswarnath. The lingam is submerged in water and is not ordinarily visible. For the benefit of the pilgrims, another Shivalingam has been created outside the waterfall.

Koilighugar has an annual fair on the occasion of Sivaratri.

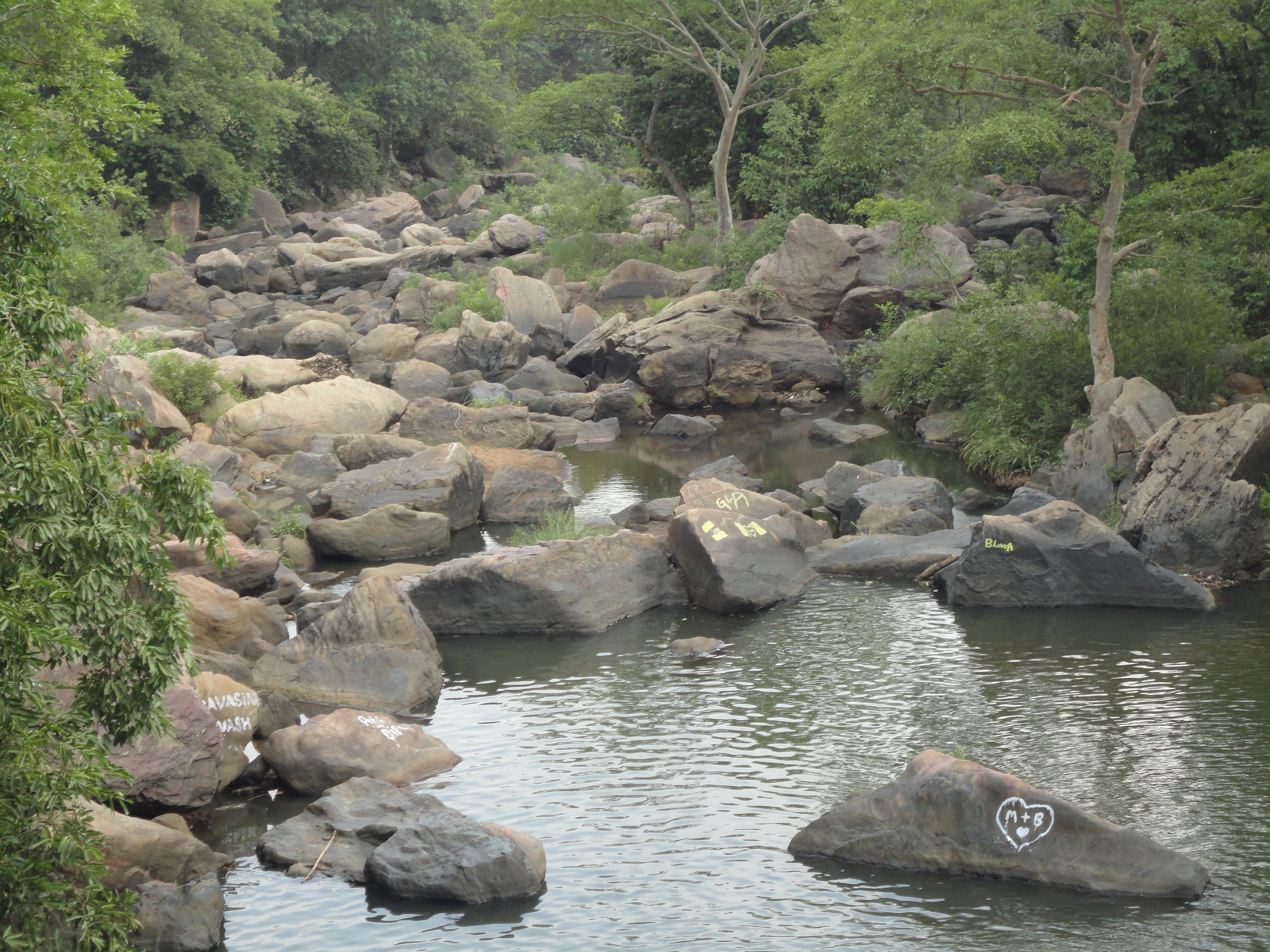
Koilighugar Stream, near the waterfall.

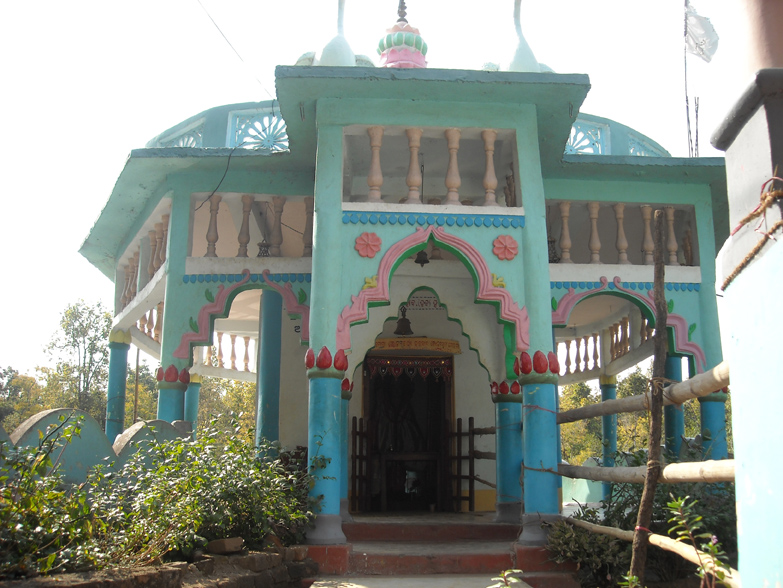
shantikutir temple koilighugar

== See also ==
- List of waterfalls
- List of waterfalls in India
