= TRL Krosaki Refractories Limited =

Indian refractory company

- Formerly: Tata Refractories Limited; TRL
- Founded: 1958; 68 years ago in Belpahar
- Parent: Tata Group (until 2011); Krosaki Harima Corporation (from 2011)

TRL Krosaki Refractories Limited (Formerly Tata Refractories Limited and TRL) is an Indian refractory company. It was established in 1958 in Belpahar, a city in Jharsuguda district of Odisha.

It mainly produces basic, dolomite, high alumina, monolithics, silica, flow control products and tap hole clay refractories having a consolidated installed capacity of 4,00,000 MT per annum.

Its key customers are the steel, cement, glass, copper and aluminium industries. During the year 2010–2011, the company achieved the distinction of being the first Indian refractories company to cross ₹1,000 crore (US$214.26 million) consolidated turnover. Current gross revenue stands at ₹2,299.15 crore (US$492.62 million)

== History ==
In 1958, Tata Steel formed a new refractory factory at Belpahar namely Belpahar Refractories Limited born JV between TISCO and Didier Werke, Germany. Fortune 500 Programme Launched Major modernization and expansion projects undertaken Over the years, strategies were drawn, plans were executed to modernize and grow the Plant. One of the key strategy nicknamed as "Fortune 500" in 2003 helped the Company achieve an annual Turnover of Rs.500 Crores by end of 2007.It was later renamed Tata Refractories under the Tata Group. In 2011, Tata sold 51% of its shares to Krosaki Harima Corporation of Japan, and the refractory company's name was changed to TRL Krosaki Refractories Limited.
