= Lakhanpur, Odisha =

Tehsil in Jharsuguda, Odisha, India

Lakhanpur
- Village
- Location in Odisha, India Lakhanpur (India)
- Coordinates: 21°46′0″N 83°46′0″E
- Country: India
- State: Odisha
- District: Jharsuguda

Languages
  - Official: Odia
- Time zone: UTC+5:30 (IST)
- Vehicle registration: OD 23
- Website: odisha.gov.in

Lakhanpur is a tehsil in Jharsuguda district, Odisha, India. It is one among the largest block of Odisha and a village under Brajrajnagar assembly constituency and Bargarh parliamentary constituency.

== Geography ==
It is located at 21°46′0″N 83°46′0″E.

== Location ==
National Highway 49 passes through Lakhanpur.

== Places of interest ==
The Koilighugar Waterfall, around 200 ft in height, is in the Lakhanpur, near the village Kushmelbahal. The waterfall is in a rivulet named 'Ahiraj' which originates from the 'Chhuikhanch' forest. After the fall the rivulet flows west wards to merge into the river Mahanadi. It is a picturesque beauty spot with its sylvan back drop.

Inside the fall there is a Shivalingam known as 'Maheswarnath'. The lingam is submerged in water and is not ordinarily visible. For the benefit of the pilgrims, another Sivalingam has been created outside the waterfall.

Koilighugar has an annual fair on the occasion of Sivaratri.

The second historical place is Bikramkhol

Vikramkhol also spelled Bikramkhol (Odia: ବିକ୍ରମଖୋଲ) is a prehistoric archaeological site located near Jharsuguda, Odisha state, India and lies in Reserved Forest of Belpahar range, at a distance of 24 km from Lakhanpur. The place is known for prehistoric rock art and rock inscriptions dated around 3000 BCE.
