= Jamkani =

- Location within Odisha Location within India
- Coordinates: 21.799557°N 83.877248°E
- Country: India
- State: Odisha
- District: Jharsuguda

languages
  - official: Oriya language
- Time zone: UTC+5:30 (IST)
- PIN: 768217

Jamkani is a village coming under Belpahar Municipality. The populants here generally speak Sambalpuri language. It is present at a distance of about 0.8 km from the TRL Stadium of Gumadera and nearly 1.4 km from Belpahar Railway Fatak. Nearly 10000 people reside in this place as of now, the correct population cannot be predicted because of village area. The total census is calculated for Belpahar.

== Nearby places ==
Jamkani is surrounded places like Bandhbahal, Belpahar, Brajrajnagar, Jurabaga, Chingriguda, Chuali Barna. Jamkani village contains many localities or sub villages like Muchbahal, Mahulpada, Harijanpada, etc.

== Economy ==
Generally people of Jamkani do farming, mining, employees in TRL Krosaki, Some also earn their living by selling coals. Few of them have shops to cater with their needs. Selling fisheries and crops are also professions here.

== Transport ==
Jamkani is not connected by any railway. It is well connected by roadways via Jamkani Road. Transport is predominantly using private vehicles, as it is far away from public transport.

== Places of interest ==
Jamkani village has many temples. Some of the well known temples are Maa Kali Dakshineswari Mandir, Hanuman Mandir of Muchbahal and Mahulpada. There is also a playground near the Kali temple, which holds many football and cricket matches among teams of nearby places. There is also a nearby coal mine in this area. Kantapali Railway station is present near to this area.

== Education ==
Small students here are sent to kindergarten in the locality. Two Govt funded primary schools are present in Jamkani. They are:

- Jamkani UP School
- Muchbahal Primary School

High School

- Jamkani high school
