= Veer Surendra Sai Airport =

Airport in Odisha, India

- IATA: JRG; ICAO: VEJH

Summary
- Airport type: Public
- Owner: Airports Authority of India
- Serves: Jharsuguda
- Location: Durlaga, Jharsuguda, Odisha, India
- Opened: 22 September 2018; 8 years ago
- Elevation AMSL: 757 ft (231 m)
- Coordinates: 21°54′48″N 84°03′01″E
- Website: Jharsuguda Airport

Map
- Location of airport in Odisha JRG (India)

Runways
Direction	Length		Surface
Direction	ft	m	Surface
06/24	7,844	2,391	Concrete

Statistics (April 2025 – March 2026)
- Passengers: 4,42,601 (▲41.2%)
- Aircraft movements: 4,566 (▲43.9%)
- Cargo tonnage: 12 (▲ -%)
- Source: AAI

Veer Surendra Sai Airport (IATA: JRG, ICAO: VEJH), also known as Jharsuguda Airport, is a domestic airport serving Jharsuguda, Odisha, India. The airport is located 5 kilometres (3.1 mi) north-east from the city centre. The airport is located in Durlaga village, approximately 8.5 km (5.3 mi) from Jharsuguda Junction Railway Station. The airport is named after the revolutionary Veer Surendra Sai and it is the second commercial airport in the state of Odisha. The airport caters to areas like the districts of Jharsuguda, Sambalpur, Sundergarh, Bargarh, Debagarh, Bolangir, Subarnapur, Boudh of Odisha and Raigarh, Korba, Surguja and Jashpur districts of Chhattisgarh.

== History ==
In the last two years of World War II, the allied forces had anticipated a Japanese onslaught from the North-East and a string of airfields were made in the region. These included the airfields at Jharsuguda, Amarda Road, Charbatia, Hijli, Dudhkundi, Digri, Salua, Chakulia, Kalaikunda and Bishnupur. After India gained Independence from the British, the airfield was abandoned.

In July 2013, the Government of Odisha sanctioned ₹50 crores to kick-start the ₹ 175-crore airport development project which was to be jointly executed by the Airports Authority of India (AAI) and the state government. On 30 July 2014, Odisha government signed a memorandum of understanding (MoU) with the Airports Authority of India for the mentioned.

In August 2018, the airport received a 4C category licence from the Directorate General of Civil Aviation (DGCA), making Jharsuguda the second commercial airport in Odisha after Biju Patnaik International Airport in Bhubaneswar. The airport is eligible to land A-320 type Airbus aircraft.

On 22 September 2018, Prime Minister Narendra Modi inaugurated the airport, in the presence of Odisha Governor Ganeshi Lal, Chief Minister Naveen Patnaik, Union Petroleum and Natural Gas Minister Dharmendra Pradhan, former Union Minister of Civil Aviation Suresh Prabhu and former Bargarh Lok Sabha Member Prabhas Singh.

In October 2026, the Union government approved ₹2,100 crore for the expansion of the airport. The tentative expansion plan includes extending the airport’s runway from the present 2,391 metres to 3,600 metres, construction of a second terminal building, development of a new administrative complex, a parallel taxi track, and addition of more aircraft parking bays and aprons. The project will also entail installation of approach lighting systems and advanced navigational infrastructure.

== Facilities ==
=== Terminal ===
Inaugurated in September 2018, the passenger terminal is built over an area of 5,500 square metres (59,000 sq ft) with a modular design for handling 150 arriving and 150 departing passengers at a time with a scope for future expansion. The runway can land Airbus A321 and Boeing 737 aircraft.

The airport was renamed after freedom fighter Veer Surendra Sai by the cabinet on 1 November 2018. The interiors of the terminal building depict local handcraft such as world-famous Sambalpuri sari, Sambalpuri dance, artwork and tourist destinations of Odisha.

== Airlines and destinations ==
Airlines	Destinations
IndiGo	Bengaluru, Delhi, Kolkata
Star Air	Bhubaneswar
