= Adhapara =

Adhapara New Adhapara, Nua-adhapara
- village
- Location in Odisha, India
- Coordinates: 21.703°N 83.844°E
- Country: India
- State: Odisha
- District: Jharsuguda

Population
  - Total: 1,500

Languages
  - Official: Odiya
- Time zone: UTC+5:30 (IST)
- PIN: 768234
- Telephone code: 06645
- Vehicle registration: OR-
- Nearest city: Jharsuguda
- Literacy: 70%
- Website: odisha.gov.in

Adhapara is a small village in the district of Jharsuguda in Odisha, India.This village migrated from Hirakud Dam area in the year 1957. As of 2011, there were a total of 332 families living in the village. It is about 35 km away from Jharsuguda.

Like the rest of Orissa, the language spoken in the village is Sambalpuri and Oriya. The village is situated near (about 2/3 km away) from Ib-Thermal Power Station (a govt. Of ORISSA PSU). According to the 2011 State Census, Adhapara had a higher literacy rate than rest of Orissa. Schools located in the village include U.P School Adhapara, M.E School Adhapara, and Jawahrlal High School, Adhapara. However, in 2013, schools in Adhapara and others in the Jharsuguda district reported only having one teacher per school.

A Hospital is located in the village and participates in free health camps in the region by providing doctors to diagnose ailments of participants.
