= Belpahar =

Town in Jharsuguda, Odisha, India

- Town
- Location in Odisha, India Belpahar (India)
- Coordinates: 21.8218°N 83.8458°E
- Country: India
- State: Odisha
- District: Jharsuguda

Population (2001)
  - Total: 32,807

Languages
  - Official: Odia
- Time zone: UTC+5:30 (IST)
- PIN: 768218
- Vehicle registration: OR-23/OD-23
- Sex ratio: 1.166 ♂/♀
- Website: odisha.gov.in

Belpahar is a town and a municipality in Jharsuguda district in the state of Odisha, India. Belpahar is famous for its geographical location, as it is the center for many coal mines areas nearby. Krosaki TRL Limited is located in Belpahar while there is Mahanadi Coalfields Limited and Ib Thermal Power station in the vicinity. It has a railway station which levels 55 metres high above the sea level. This area is among the fastest-growing industrial zones in Odisha.

== Demographics ==
As of the 2011 Census of India, Belpahar had a population of 38,832. Males constitute 54% of the population and females 46%. Belpahar has an average literacy rate of 75%, higher than the national average of 59.5%; with 60% of the males and 40% of females literate. 11% of the population is under 6 years of age.

=== Villages near Belpahar ===
Belpahar has many villages and cities under its municipality. Some of the villages and localities include Muchbahal, Jurabaga, Jamkani, Mahulpada, Gumadera, Kuiltapada, Limtikra, Chingriguda, Jurabaga, Kadel Munda, Chhualiberna, Kadupada, Nayapada, Kisanpada, Khukhelmal, Gotiapada, Harijanpada, Jahajpadia, Malipada, Mirdhadera.Gandhinagar, Rehmatnagar Belpahar municipality is surrounded by localities like Jharsuguda, Brajrajnagar, Piplimal, Kudaloi, Kudopali, Kantapali, Kirmira, Khairkuni, Darlipali, Liakhai, and Junadihi.

== Transport ==
Belpahar is well connected by road, rail air. Belpahar railway station is well connected with trains from Howrah, Mumbai, New Delhi, Bhubaneswar and Ahmedabad. Jharsuguda which is 22 km from Belpahar is connected from the rest of the country including Chennai and Bangalore.

Belpahar is connected through direct buses from Rourkela, Bhubaneswar, Sambalpur, Bhadrak and Raipur. National Highway 200 connects Belpahar directly to Raipur.

== Economy ==
Belpahar is surrounded by many coal mines. The IB thermal power plant is located near Belpahar. The major industry is TRL Krosaki Ltd. (formerly Tata Refactories Limited). Other important industries surrounding Belpahar are IB Thermal Power Plant and Mahanadi Coal Field. Other Industries:- (i) New Simplex Industries (ii) Shyam Engineering Works (iii) ICI Chemicals (iv) Ib Valley Metal Forming (P) Ltd.

== Education ==
Belpahar has six major schools. Girdhar Lal Tanna High School (GLHS), Aadarsh Balika Utchya Vidyalay (ABUV), Belpahar English Medium School (BEMS), Vivekananda International School (VIS), and the Belpahar Refractory High school (BRHS), which prepares students for higher secondary education. Beside this Saraswati sishu vidya mandir (SSVM) also groom students in there gurukul like green campus near Kadelpita of Belpahar. Of these, Girdhar Lal H.S. is the oldest. BEMS & VIS follow the curriculum of ICSE (Class 10) and ISC (Class 12). BRHS follow the curriculum of the Odisha State Board of secondary education and it is the leading Odia medium school in the district of Jharsuguda. For higher studies, Belpahar college offers graduate degrees in commerce and arts. Apart from these many government primary schools are present in different villages of Belpahar. Other than this nearby places like Bandhbahal and Brajrajnagar offer schools like D.A.V public school for students.

== Sports ==
TRL Ground is one of the biggest ground in state. Surrounded by gallery of sitting capacity 10,000 people at once. It has witnessed many state level cricket tournament and national level ladies' football tournament. Moreover, various events like Balyashree Olympiad are organized here. Parades and various cultural programs from schools during Independence day and Republic day are held here. On the eve of Dussehra, a huge Ravan idol is burnt here with a great pomp and joy. Regular football and volleyball matches are held here.

== Places of interest ==
Belpahar also has some nearby tourist attractions such as Koili Ghoghar (35 kilometres from Belpahar), Lal Pathar (8 km from Belpahar), Khadu (5 kilometres from Belpahar), Bikramkhol in Banjari village, Ullapgarh & Ujjalpur (7 kilometres from Belphar), Jagannath Temple, Nava Durga Temple (Gandhi Nagar, Belpahar) and IB river (8 kilometres from Belpahar). The Sani mandir at Sukha Bandh also attracts many devotees.

Belpahar has one park named Jubilee Park having a large variety of flowers and water fountain cover with light work. The name of this park has been changed to JRD TATA Park.

Apart from this, Belpahar also has a TRE club for the employees working in TRL Krosaki Ltd. The club has gym and a library, known by Gopabandhu Library. Another hall, called Jubilee Hall, holds many functions including marriages, pujas, and some magic.

Belpahar and surrounding areas are full of minerals. Makarchatta - (3 kilometres from Belpahar), Sitaram pahad (2.5 km from Belpahar). Bikram Khol(4 kilometres from Belpahar), Lal pathar(4.5 kilometres from Belpahar), Khadu(5 kilometres from Belpahar), Banjari (3 kilometres from Belpahar).

=== Bikram Khol ===
On NH-200 at about 5 km from Belpahar there is a village known as Banjari. In the vicinity of the village the ancient cave of Bikramkhol is located. In this inaccessible dense forest ancient people lived surviving on fruits, roots and animal meat. During 4000 BC there was evolution of human civilization in the region and a script was developed by them.

There are some ancient script engraved in the wall of Bikramkhol and also paintings of animals. Circular holes have been dug in the wall where weapons, dress and other articles of use were being kept suspended. Even on the floors circular holes have been dug to pound the grains. Bikramkhol has been declared a tourist spot by the Central Government and tourists, historians and researchers from all over the country and abroad.

=== Koili Ghoghar ===
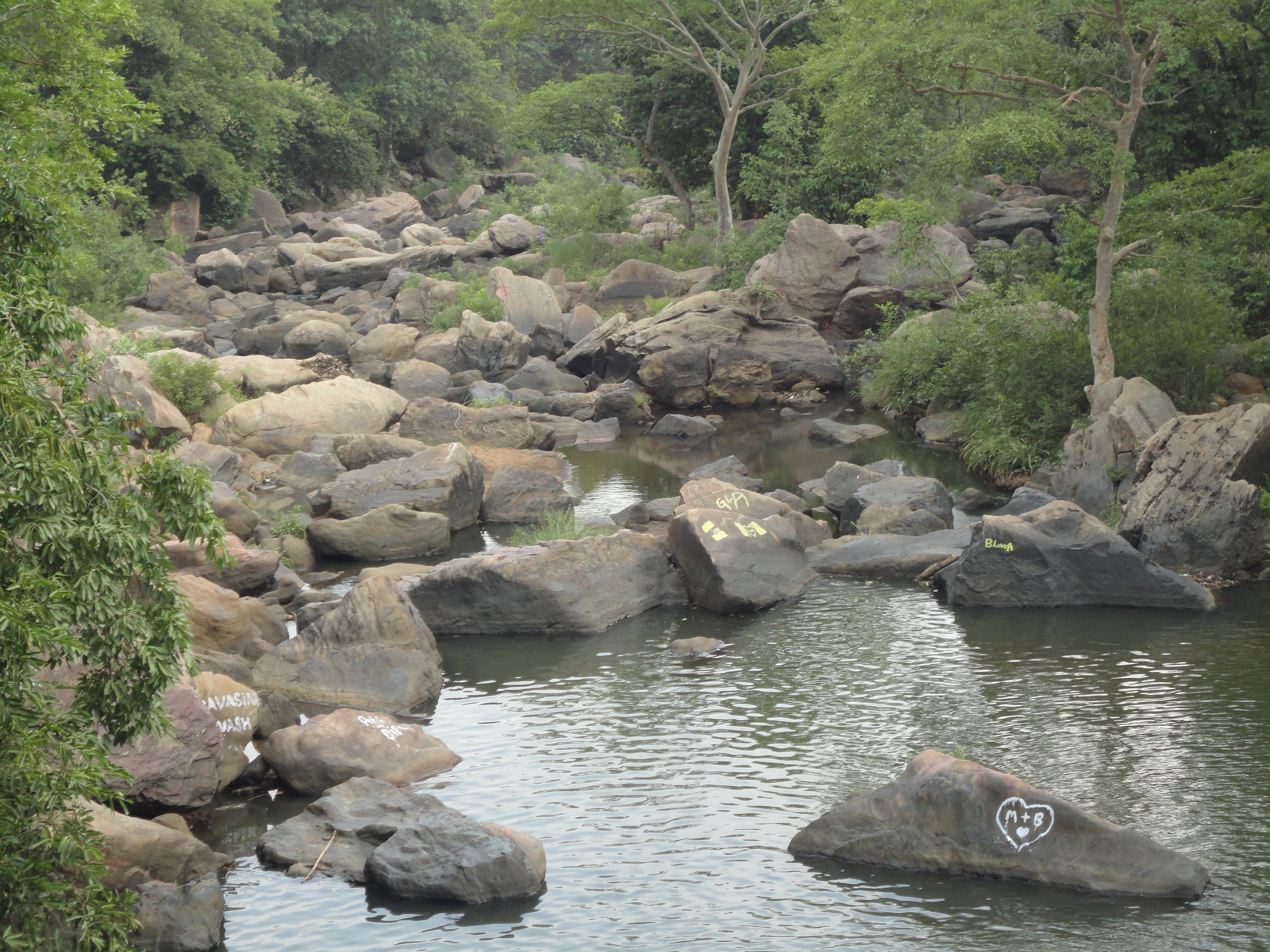
View of Koili Ghoghar

A scenic tourist spot about forty-five minutes away from Belpahar Railway Station on the way to Raigarh, Koili Ghoghar houses a river carving its way out of rock faces and cascading down in steps. The area is inhabited by ducks and monkeys. It is a popular picnic spot. There is also a Shiva temple and a temple venerating a local deity. The town also has a Maa Tarini temple, near the NAC Checkpost, in the dense forest.

=== Ullapgarh ===
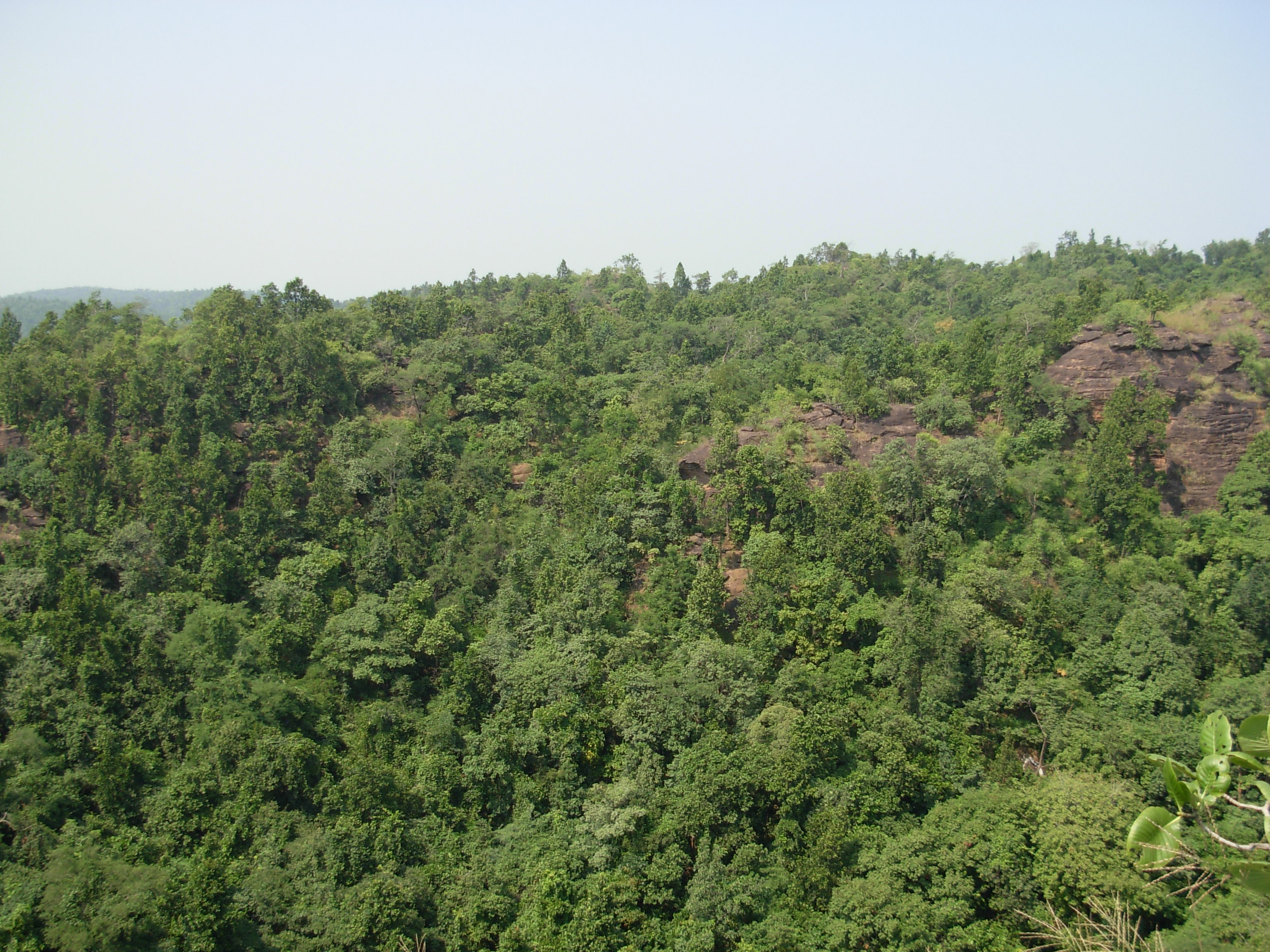
View of surrounding hillocks from Ullapgarh

A hillock located approximately fifteen minutes from Belpahar Railway Station, this site served as a refuge for revolutionaries during the Indian independence movement. Rock-carved spaces used to hold torches remain visible today. Reaching the summit requires navigating steep terrain and hot weather conditions, but the top offers expansive views of the surrounding green landscape. Visitors should note that trails can be easy to lose and caution is recommended. The location is commonly used as a local picnic spot.

On the foot of Maheswar Pahad, there is a small village called "Ulap". About one kilometer from the village, the ruins of Ulapgarh are situated. At this place, the Maheswar pahad is about 1000 ft high and on the top there is a huge plain surface. On this rectangular plain stone surface the fort of Ulapgarh had been constructed. The plain stone fine surface is about 400 metre long and 250 metre wide. On the eastern side of the fort there are almost 7 km of densely forested Baramunda Hills and on the western side, the Belpahar Railway Station is located at a distance of 5 km. On the north there is a dense forest stretching up to Hemgir and in the south stretching up to Badjob village.

A 12 ft (3.66 m) wide and 500 ft (150 m) long moat had been constructed which stretches from east to west. There was a Sivalingam and a place of worship in the Fort. A well had been dug on the stone floor which provided drinking water to the inmates of the Fort throughout the year.

On the stone floor, there are many square holes and 70 round holes. The diameters of the hole vary from 1-4 inches. Wooden poles used to be put on these holes to support super structures for living room, store room, arsenals, kitchen, sleeping room, etc.

About 1000 people could take shelter at Ulapgarh at a time. On the western side of Ulapgarh and down hill there is Ushakothi cave. On the walls and floors of this cave also there are many circular and square holes. Probably the defence personnel of the fort used to suspend their clothes and other belonging from wooden poles fitted to these holes. The soldiers of the dense forest of Maheswar hill could easily over power and defeat the enemies before they could climb up the hill and attack the fort.

It is believed that Ulapgarh was being used as a residential fort by some kings of "Naja" Dynasty. This is being researched by both Indian and foreign researchers and historians.
