= Women's college, Jharsuguda =

+2 and +3 Women's college in Odisha

Women's College, Jharsuguda
- Type: Undergraduate college
- Established: 1982
- Affiliations: Sambalpur University
- Principal: Mrs Balbinder Kaur
- Location: Mangal Bazar Rd, Marwari Para, Jharsuguda,, Odisha, 768201, India; 21.855747°N 84.0174453°E
- Campus: Urban
- Website: womenscollegejharsuguda.edu.in

Women's College, Jharsuguda, is a full-fledged aided College of the Government of Odisha located in Jharsuguda district of Odisha. It was founded on 19 May 1982. The college is part of Sambalpur University. It imparts teaching in Arts, Science and Commerce both in +2 or senior secondary education and +3(three year) degree course stage with honours teaching facilities.

The college conducts both undergraduate and graduate programmes in Science, Arts and Commerce.

== College ==
Being a Degree College it is also recognized as a junior college. The Degree college comes under College code-14082404 and The Junior under the College code-14082202. (Note: INPUT : District as Jharsuguda; Block as Jharsuguda(MPL); In College type - switch between junior, degree and vocational)

== Junior college and vocational ==
Along with Women's College other Government college recognized by Odisha Government in Jharsuguda (MPL) Block area of Jharsuguda.

=== Other junior colleges ===
Other junior colleges that are present in the Jharsuguda (MPL) Block area include:-

- Laxmi Narayan Higher Secondary School, Jharsuguda
- Aryabhatt Higher Secondary School, Bijunagar, Bombay Chowk, Jharsuguda
- Hemalata Science Higher Secondary School, Sarbahal, Jharsuguda
- Black Diamond Higher Secondary School, Jharsuguda
- Pradosh Kumar Smruti Smaraki Higher Secondary School, H. Katapali
- Salegram Sakunia Higher Secondary School, Talpatia

== See also ==
- Jharsuguda district
- Laxminarayan College, Jharsuguda
- Education in India
- Literacy in India
- List of institutions of higher education in Odisha
