= Laxminarayan College, Jharsuguda =

+2 and +3 Colleges of India

Laxminarayan College
- ଲକ୍ଷ୍ମୀନାରାୟଣ ମହାବିଦ୍ୟାଳୟ
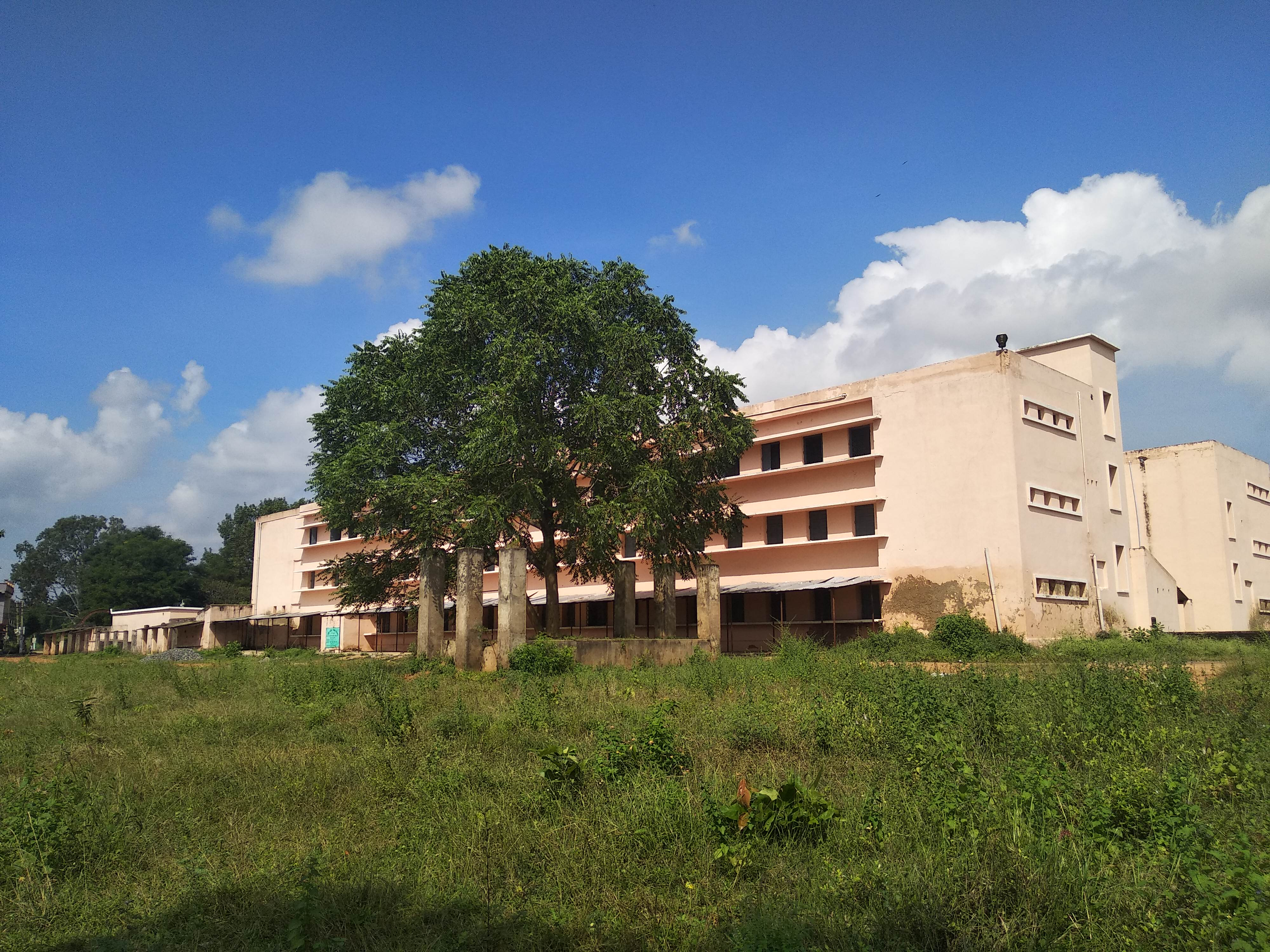
- Motto: Together we make the difference
- Type: Undergraduate college
- Established: 18 August 1969; 57 years ago
- Affiliations: Sambalpur University
- President: Naba Kishore Das
- Principal: Mrs. Snehalata Mishra
- Location: Badheimunda, Jharsuguda, Odisha, 768201, India; 21.8583024°N 84.0430793°E
- Campus: Rural
- Location within Odisha Location within India

Laxminarayan College, Jharsuguda, also called L. N. College, is a full-fledged aided College of the Government of Odisha located in Jharsuguda district of Odisha. It was founded on 18 August 1969. This college comes under Sambalpur University. It imparts teaching in Arts, Science and Commerce in +2 or senior secondary education, +3(three year) Degree Course with honours, and Post Graduation courses.

== History ==
Established on 18 August 1969, the college is one of the oldest in western Odisha. Laxminarayan College is a fully aided educational institution of the government of Odisha, having many UGC- scale teachers. The college was credited with a "B+" grade by NAAC in 2024.

== College ==
Being a Degree College it is also being recognized as a junior college and also offers vocational courses. The Degree college comes under College code-14082303 and The Junior and vocational under the college code-14082101 and 14081802 respectively.

== Affiliation ==
This college is afflicted to Sambalpur University. This college is recognised as Laxmi Narayan (Degree) College, Jharsuguda.

== Junior College and Vocational ==
Along with L. N. College other Government college recognized by Odisha Government in Jharsuguda (MPL) Block area of Jharsuguda.

=== Other junior colleges ===
Other junior colleges in the Jharsuguda(MPL) Block area include :-

- Women's Higher Secondary School, Jharsuguda
- Aryabhatt Higher Secondary School, Bijunagar, Bombay Chowk, Jharsuguda
- Hemalata Science Higher Secondary School, Sarbahal, Jharsuguda
- Black Diamond Higher Secondary School, Jharsuguda
- Pradosh Kumar Smruti Smaraki Higher Secondary School, H. Katapali
- Salegram Sakunia Higher Secondary School, Talpatia

== List of governing Bodies ==
These are the list of governing Bodies of L. N. College Jharsuguda.

Member Name	Designation
Mrs Balbindar Kaur	PRESIDENT
PRINCIPAL I/C	SECRETARY (EX-OFFICIO)
Bigyana Bhusan Bhanja	MEMBER( TEACHERS REPRESENTATIVE)
Soudamini Pandey	MEMBER(W)( TEACHERS REPRESENTATIVE)
BADAL KU SARKAR	MEMBER (NON-TEACHING STAFF REPRESENTATIVE)
HARISH GANATRA	MEMBER (CHAIR PERSON, JHARSUGUDA MUNICIPALITY)
MANORANJAN MOHAPATRA	MEMBER ( MP NOMINEE)
PRATAP BEHERA	MEMBER (MLA NOMINEE)
ARUNIMA HOTA	MEMBER [DHE(O) NOMINEE] (W)
BHARATI DASH	MEMBER [VICE-CHANCELLOR NOMINEE(W)]
MOTILAL TANTY	MEMBER (SC)
ER ABID ALI	MEMBER (MINORITY COMMUNITY)
SIDDHARTHA SARKAR	MEMBER (DONOR)
MARIA GORATI DUNGDUNG	WOMAN MEMBER
LIPIKA MOHAPATRA	WOMAN MEMBER

== List of Principals ==
These are the list of principles of L. N college Jharsuguda.

Principal Name	Qualification	DOJ	DOD
Prof. Govinda Chandra Sahoo			
Dr. S. L. Mishra	M, Sc, M.Phil, Ph.D	01-10-2023	
Mr. N. K. Panda	M.Com, M.Phil, L.L.B	01-10-2021	30-09-2023
Lt. B. B. Dash	M.Sc., M.Phil, L.L.B	01-07-2021	31-09-2021
Sri R. K. Debata	M.A	01-01-2021	30-06-2021
Sri G.C. Meher	M.Com	01-10-2011	06-02-2014
Sri D.S. Naik	M.Sc.	30-06-2010	30-09-2011
Sri P.C. Behera	MA	23-06-2009	30-06-2010
Maj(Dr) B.K, Patel	M.Sc, Ph.D.	11-06-2007	16-06-2007
Maj (Dr) B.K, Patel	M.Sc, Ph.D.	01-09-2006	10-06-2007
Sri D.K Nayak	M.Sc	10-08-2000	31-08-2006
Sri R.K Khamari	M.A, (In charge)	11-11-1989	09-08-2000
Dr. S.K Suar	M.A, Ph.D. (In charge)	01-10-1999	10-11-1999
Sri S. Patel	M.A, B.Ed.	22-07-1998	30-09-1999
Sri D.K. Nayak	MSc (Incharge)	01-07-1998	21-07-1998
Sri D. Panda	M.Sc	08-08-1997	30-06-1998
Sri D. K. Nayak	M.Sc (Incharge)	01-04-1997	07-08-1997
Dr. S.B Dash	M.Sc, Ph.D.	01-09-1989	31-03-1997
Sri B.B. Meher	MA, OES(I)	07-01-1987	31-08-1989
Sri P. K. Kar	M.A (Incharge)	07-05-1986	06-01-1987
Dr. R.N Nanda	MSc, Ph.D.	11-10-1982	07-05-1986
Sri A Sahani	M.A, OES, (I)	03-06-1982	10-10-1982
Dr. N. B Dhal	M.Sc, Ph D (Incharge)	01-03-1982	02-06-1982
Sri H. Mishra	M.Sc, (In charge)	01-02-1982	28-02-1982
Dr. B. K. Naik	M.Sc, Ph.D., OES, (I )	01-02-1979	31-01-1982
Dr. N. B Dhal	M.Sc, Ph.D. (In charge)	12-08-1978	01-02-1979
Sri B. C. Naik	M.A (Patna) MA (UtkaI), OES (I)	07-09-1973	12-08-1978
Dr. N. C. Mishra	M.Sc, Ph.D. (Incharge)	07-09-1973	12-08-1978
Sri P. C.Mohapatra	M.A., OES (I)	18-08-1969	07-09-1973

== Building ==
Although the main building of the college is housed in an erstwhile Hostel of the Engineering School of Jharsuguda, later on many new infrastructures along with a sports complex financed by the UGC has been added. The building will be shifted to a new place after the approval of Government of Odisha.

== Naac Grade 2018 ==
According to latest reports of N.A.A.C 34th Meeting of the Standing Committee (30 November 2018), list of Institutions Recommended for Accreditation by NAAC 2nd cycle report, L. N. College had ranked Grade C with CGPA 1.94. The grade system of N.A.A.C usually lasts for 5 years and after the completion of 5 years the NAAC team again visits the respective college for grading.

N.A.A.C grades institute with 8 grade ladder :-

Sl. No	Range of institutional CGPA	Letter Grade	Performance Descriptor
1.	3.51 – 4.00	A++	Accredited
2.	3.26 – 3.50	A+	Accredited
3.	3.01 – 3.25	A	Accredited
4.	2.76 – 3.00	B++	Accredited
5.	2.51 – 2.75	B+	Accredited
6.	2.01 – 2.50	B	Accredited
7.	1.51 – 2.00	C	Accredited
8.	≤ 1.50	D	Not Accredited

== See also ==
- Education in India
- Education in Odisha
- Women's college, Jharsuguda
- List of institutions of higher education in Odisha
- List of colleges affiliated to Sambalpur University
