= Binod Chandra Nayak =

Indian Odia poet (1919–2003)

- Born: 2 September 1919; Telipalli, Sundargarh
- Died: 15 November 2003 (aged 84)
- Writing career
- Notable work: Sarisrupa

Binod Chandra Nayak (2 September 1919 - 15 November 2003) was an Odia writer. He was known for his writing that was influenced by modern poetry while being romantic. He was awarded the 1970 Kendra Sahitya Akademi award for his poetry collection Sarisrupa.

== Early life and career ==
He was born on 2 September 1919 at Telipalli, Sundargarh. He was a postgraduate in English Literature before working for government of Odisha. He retired as principal of Laxminarayan College, Jharsuguda, in 1978. He also worked as chairman of Odisha Sahitya Akademi. He was awarded with an honorary D.Litt. degree from Sambalpur University. He died in 2003.

== Published works ==
- Haimanti, 1933
- Chandra o Tara - 1951
- Nila Chandrara Upatyaka - 1951
- Nayaka, Binoda (1969). Sarisrpa (in Odia). Larka buksa. OCLC 30883706.
- Nayaka, Binoda (1969). Ilabrtta (in Odia). Bikasa Pratishthana. OCLC 30883593.
- Nayaka, Binoda (1962). Nandadebi (in Odia). Bikasa pratishthana. OCLC 31095254.
- Nayaka, Binoda (1962). Sata tarara dipa (in Odia). Sarasvata Pustaka Bhandara. OCLC 20146974.
- Nayaka, Binoda (1970). Pohala dvipara upakatha (in Odia). Je. Mahapatra. OCLC 40969448.
- Nayaka, Binoda Candra (1989). Rajakiya nihsangata (in Odia). Grantha Mandira. OCLC 499639714.
- Nayaka, Binoda (1990). Kañcana Kuntalara tarabari (in Odia). Kataka Shtudentas Shtora. OCLC 24626578.
- Nayaka, Binoda (1987). Binodanayaka kabitasañcayana (in Odia). Odisa Buk Shtora. OCLC 21152256.

== Awards ==
- Atibadi Jagannath Das Samman - 2000
- Kendra Sahitya Akademi Award - 1970
