= Anchal College, Padampur =

Undergraduate college under Odisha Government

Anchal College
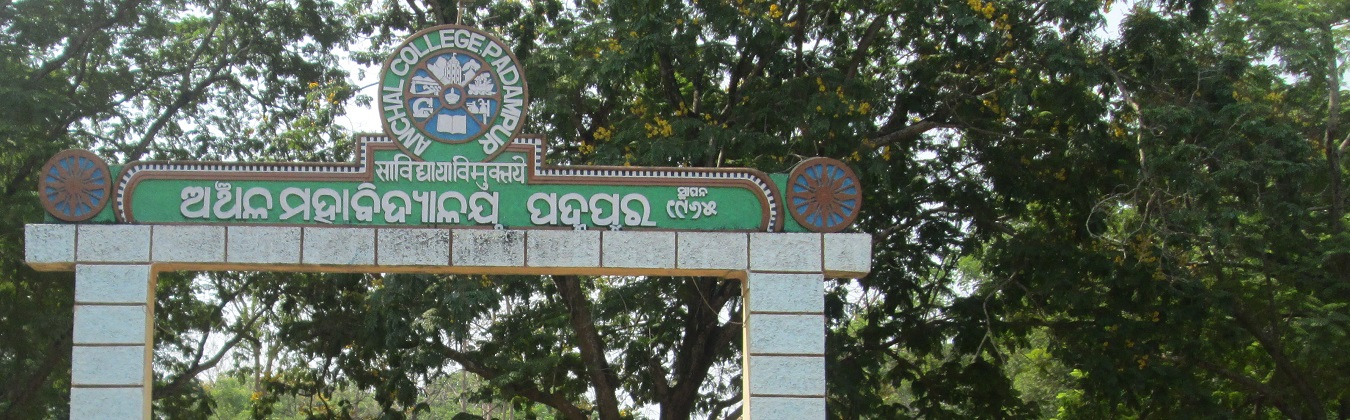
- Type: Undergraduate college
- Established: 1965
- Affiliations: Sambalpur University
- Principal: Sri. Khageshwar Dash
- Location: Padampur, Bargarh, Odisha, India; 20°59′18.8″N 83°02′30.4″E
- Campus: Rural, 15.8 acres (6.4 ha)
- Website: anchalcollege.org

Anchal college is a public undergraduate college in Bargarh District of Odisha, India. Established in 1965, the college was initially affiliated to Utkal University. After the establishment of Sambalpur University in 1966, the college came to be affiliated to this new university. This college provides education in Higher Secondary and Degree level in Arts, Science and Commerce. This instituite had also signed MoU with KISS university.

== History ==
The college is one of the oldest college in western Odisha being established in the year 1965. This college is a fully aided educational institution of the government of Odisha, having many UGC- scale teachers. The college was credited with a "B" grade by NAAC. This college was early afflicted with Utkal University, till when in 1969 Sambalpur University came into existence and afflicted with the new university. It is present in the revenue district of Bargarh. Several alumni have highlighted their association with this college in their books.

== Department ==
The college provides teaching in the following courses: Botany, Chemistry, Commerce, Economics, Education, English, History, Mathematics, Oriya (Odia language), Philosophy, Physics, Political science, Sanskrit, Zoology, and Information Technology.

== NAAC Grade 2016 ==
The National Assessment and Accreditation Council (NAAC) is an independent autonomous body that works under University Grants Commission (UGC) which was established in the year 1994 with its headquarters in Bengaluru. The overall work of this autonomous body is to improve the quality of education, by visiting college and providing grades it decides the condition of the institution and provides funds. According to the latest reports of Meeting of the Standing Committee, list of Institutions Recommended for Accreditation by NAAC 2nd cycle report, Anchal College had ranked Grade B with CGPA 2.21 C.G.P.A. The grading system of N.A.A.C usually lasts for 5 years and after the completion of 5 years, the NAAC team again visits the respective college for grading.

N.A.A.C grades institute with 8 grade ladder:

Sl. No	Range of institutional CGPA	Letter Grade	Performance Descriptor
1.	3.51 – 4.00	A++	Accredited
2.	3.26 – 3.50	A+	Accredited
3.	3.01 – 3.25	A	Accredited
4.	2.76 – 3.00	B++	Accredited
5.	2.51 – 2.75	B+	Accredited
6.	2.01 – 2.50	B	Accredited
7.	1.51 – 2.00	C	Accredited
8.	≤ 1.50	D	Not Accredited

== Controversy ==
In 2023, allegations of inappropriate conduct were raised against Dr. Biranchi Sahoo, Head of the Economics Department at Anchal College, Padampur, in Odisha's Bargarh district. Several students accused him of sending unsolicited and inappropriate messages to female students through WhatsApp over a period of years. The allegations gained public attention after a student reportedly filed a complaint and screenshots of alleged conversations circulated on social media. In response, students organized protests demanding action. Local authorities intervened, and the college governing body was directed to conduct an investigation. Dr. Sahoo denied wrongdoing and offered an alternative explanation for his communications with students.

== Notable alumni ==
These are a list of alumnis of Anchal college.

- N.K Pujhari
