= Jharsuguda =

Town in Odisha, India

Jharsuguda Jhārsuguṛā (Odia)
- city
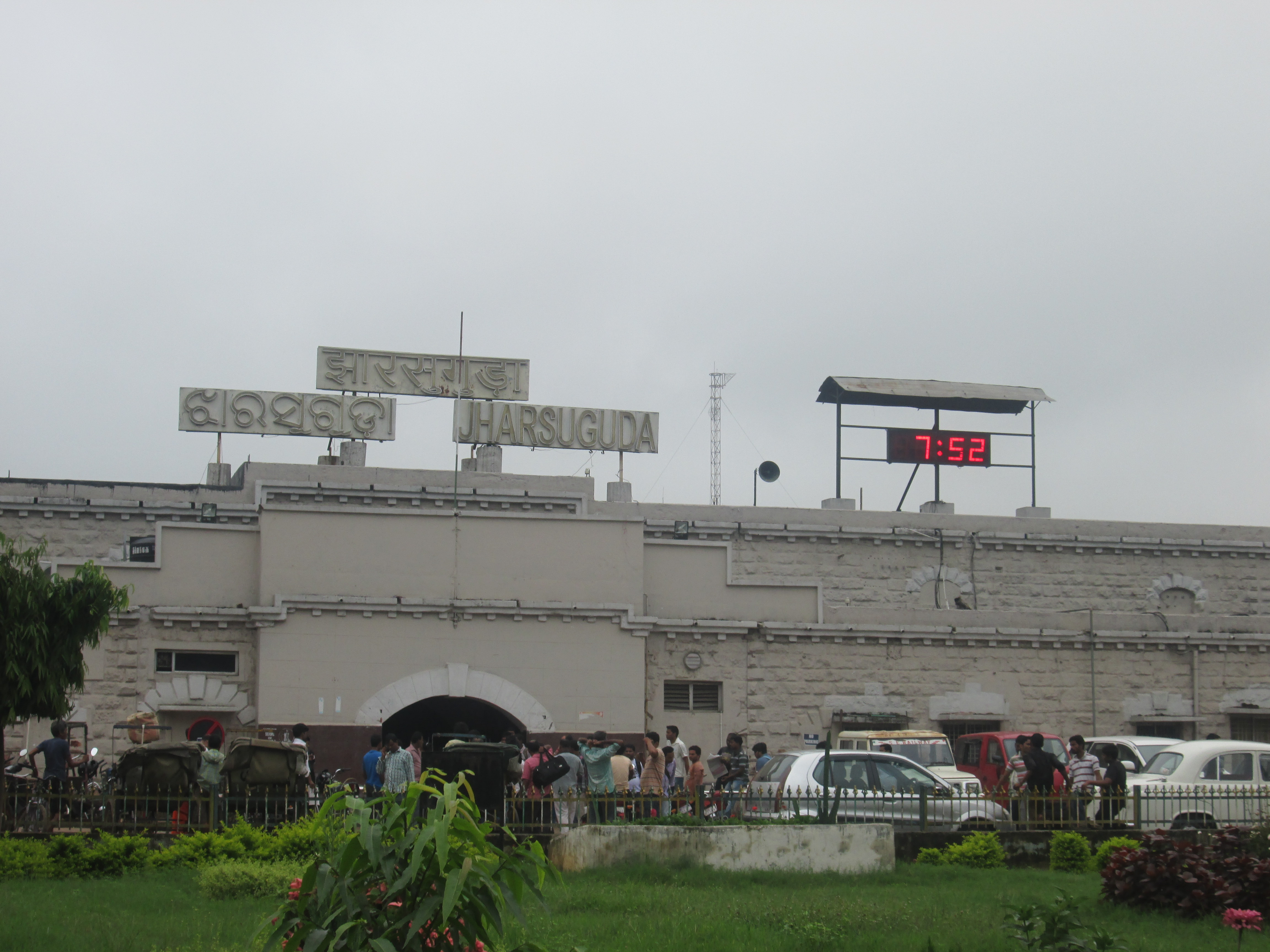
- Nickname: JSG
- Location in Odisha, India Jharsuguda (India) Jharsuguda (Asia) Jharsuguda (Earth)
- Coordinates: 21.85°N 84.03°E
- Country: India
- State: Odisha
- District: Jharsuguda
- Established: 1951

Government
  - Type: Municipality

Area
  - Total: 45 km^{2} (17 sq mi)
- Elevation: 218 m (715 ft)

Population (2011)
  - Total: 97,730
  - Density: 2,200/km^{2} (5,600/sq mi)
- Demonym: Jharsugudia

Languages
  - Official: Odia
  - Local: Sambalpuri
- Time zone: UTC+5:30 (IST)
- PIN: 768201
- Vehicle registration: OD-23 (Previously OR-23)
- Website: jharsuguda.nic.in

Jharsuguda (Odia pronunciation: [dʒʰaɾɔsuɡuɽa]) is a town and district headquarters of Jharsuguda district of Odisha, India. It is an industrial hub, consisting mainly of metallurgical industries. It is well connected to major cities of India through rail and air. It has an airport Veer Surendra Sai Airport. It is popularly known as the "Powerhouse of Odisha" due to its Mega Steel, Aluminium & Power Projects. Jharsuguda has often been referred as "Little India" as well because of its diverse demography, language and culture.

== Major Tribes ==
This district has major tribal populations among them important tribes are Sabara, Kisan, Kurukh, Bhuiyan, Munda and Santal. This district has unique diversity in terms of tribal culture, language and other focal culture. Kurukh people speak their mother tongue Kurukh language with Sadri language. Munda people speak their Ho language and Kisan people speak their Kisan dialect and Kharia speak their Kharia. Sadri and local Odia dialect is also quite popular among tribal communities.

== Geography and Climate ==
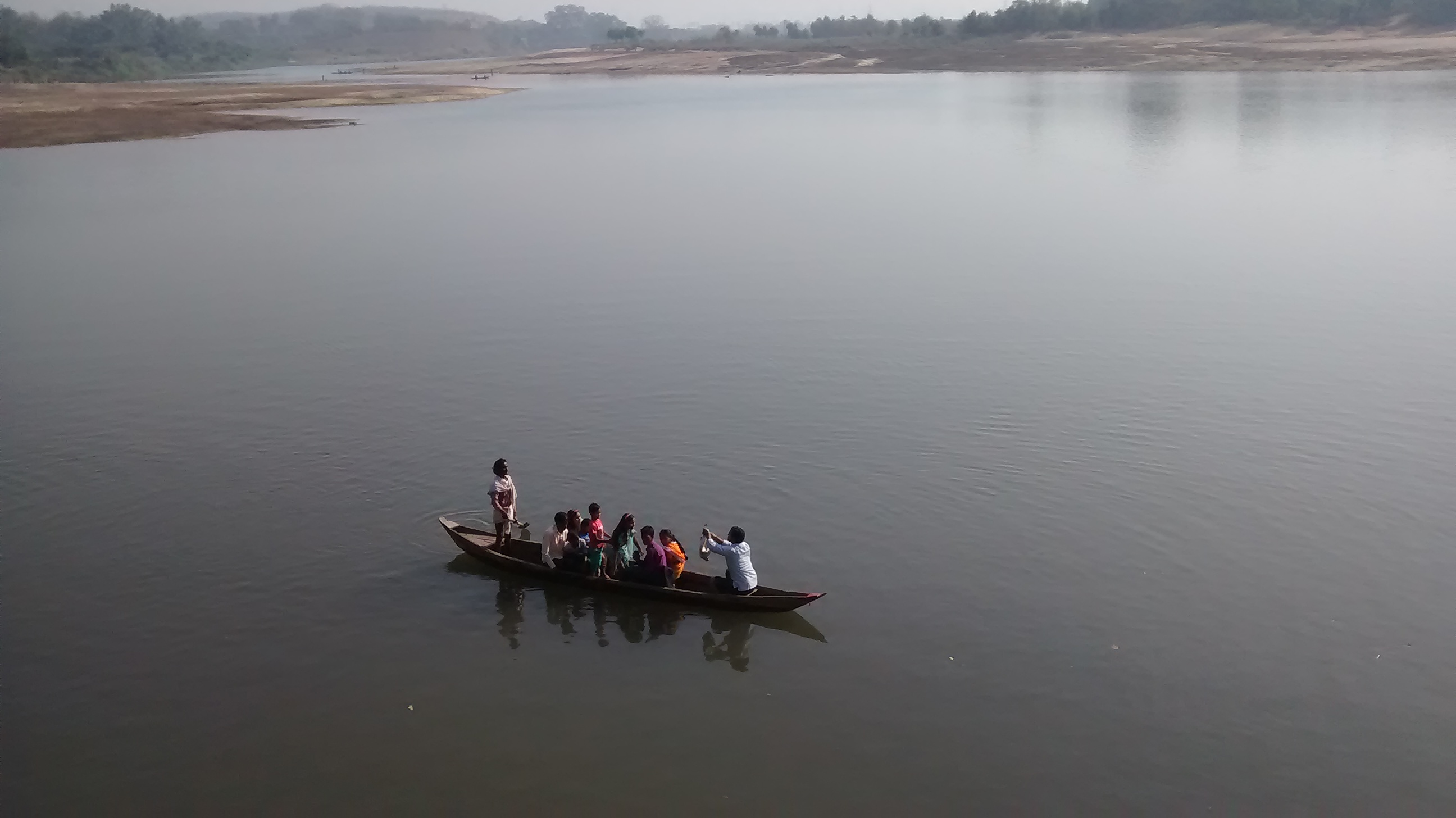
The Ib River

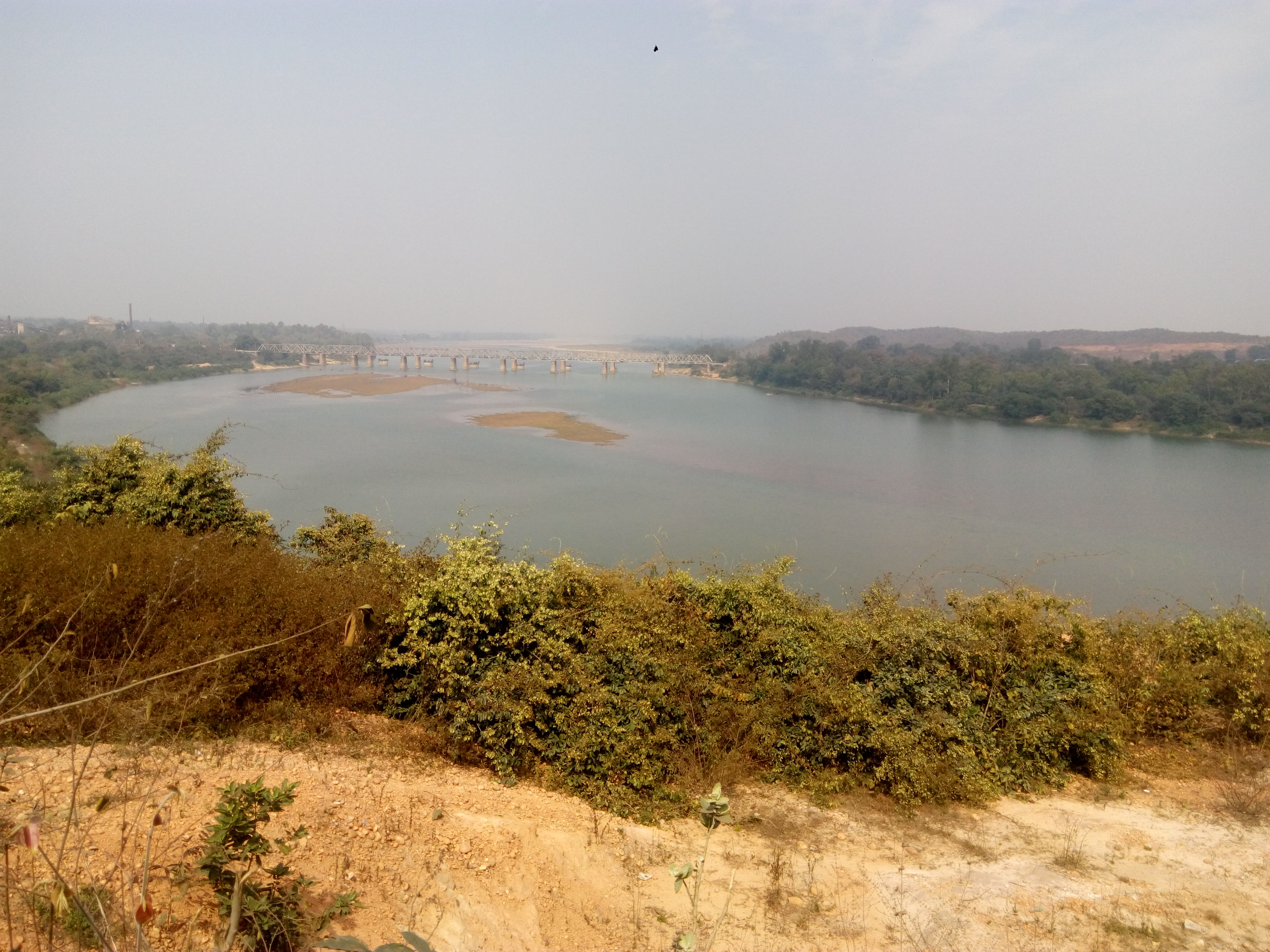
Autumn view of the Ib river

Jharsuguda is located at 21.85°N 84.03°E. It has an average elevation of 218 metres (715 ft). It is located in Western Odisha. State highway 10 and National Highway 49 (NH-49) pass through this place. The Ib river flows along the western side of Jharsuguda town and the river Bheden flows in the south. The area of the town is 70.47 km^{2}, and has a population of 579,499.

The town is situated at 21.82° north longitude and 84.1° latitude and at a height of 700–750 feet above mean sea level. The highest temperature recorded during the summer months is 48.0 °C. It has an average rainfall of 1,527 mm.

Climate data for Jharsuguda (1991–2020, extremes 1951–present)
Month	Jan	Feb	Mar	Apr	May	Jun	Jul	Aug	Sep	Oct	Nov	Dec	Year
Record high °C (°F)	35.0 (95.0)	38.4 (101.1)	43.4 (110.1)	46.2 (115.2)	48.0 (118.4)	47.1 (116.8)	41.7 (107.1)	36.2 (97.2)	38.5 (101.3)	36.8 (98.2)	35.6 (96.1)	32.8 (91.0)	48.0 (118.4)
Mean daily maximum °C (°F)	28.0 (82.4)	31.4 (88.5)	36.1 (97.0)	40.1 (104.2)	41.3 (106.3)	36.8 (98.2)	31.9 (89.4)	31.2 (88.2)	32.0 (89.6)	32.4 (90.3)	30.4 (86.7)	28.0 (82.4)	33.4 (92.1)
Daily mean °C (°F)	20.1 (68.2)	23.4 (74.1)	28.0 (82.4)	31.1 (88.0)	34.1 (93.4)	31.1 (88.0)	28.1 (82.6)	27.8 (82.0)	28.2 (82.8)	26.9 (80.4)	23.6 (74.5)	20.3 (68.5)	26.9 (80.4)
Mean daily minimum °C (°F)	12.3 (54.1)	15.4 (59.7)	19.7 (67.5)	24.5 (76.1)	27.2 (81.0)	26.7 (80.1)	25.3 (77.5)	24.9 (76.8)	24.5 (76.1)	21.7 (71.1)	16.8 (62.2)	12.6 (54.7)	21.1 (70.0)
Record low °C (°F)	5.6 (42.1)	7.2 (45.0)	11.1 (52.0)	15.8 (60.4)	16.7 (62.1)	16.3 (61.3)	17.4 (63.3)	16.6 (61.9)	16.7 (62.1)	12.1 (53.8)	8.4 (47.1)	5.8 (42.4)	5.6 (42.1)
Average rainfall mm (inches)	12.3 (0.48)	11.3 (0.44)	15.0 (0.59)	25.8 (1.02)	38.6 (1.52)	211.8 (8.34)	421.4 (16.59)	402.0 (15.83)	248.8 (9.80)	67.4 (2.65)	15.0 (0.59)	6.3 (0.25)	1,475.6 (58.09)
Average rainy days	1.2	1.2	1.6	2.3	3.4	9.5	16.1	17.8	11.3	3.7	0.9	0.4	69.3
Average relative humidity (%) (at 17:30 IST)	43	34	27	24	30	55	77	80	76	65	55	48	51
Source 1: India Meteorological Department
Source 2: Tokyo Climate Center (mean temperatures 1991–2020)

== Culture ==
Religions in Jharsuguda
Religion	Percent
Hinduism	89.73%
Islam	5.78%
Christianity	3.69%
Others	0.8%

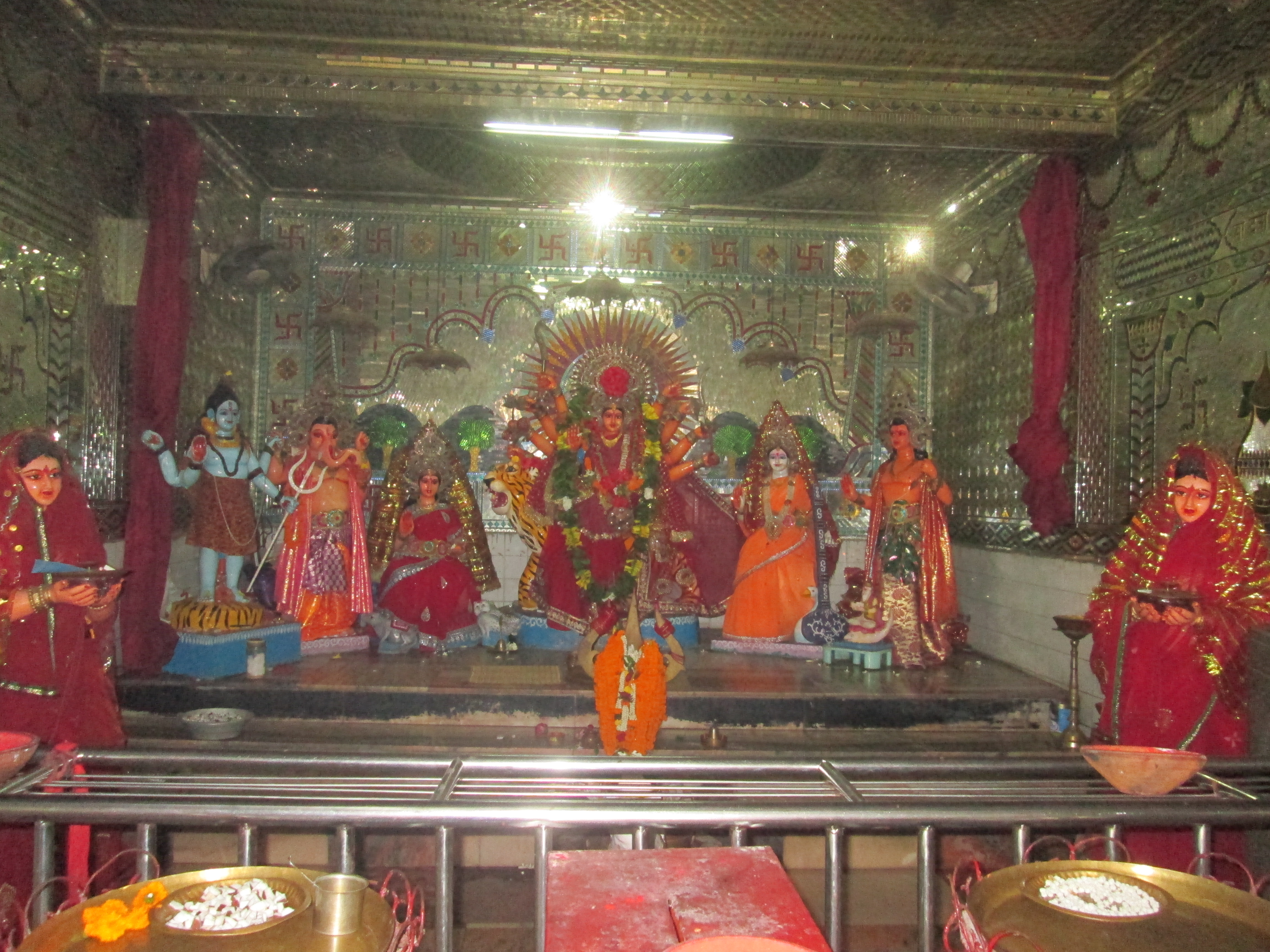
Kanaka Durga Mandir

Jharsuguda is a cosmopolitan city housing people from various regions of India. Major festivals celebrated in the town are:

- Nuakhai: This is an important festival for the people of Western Odisha. This festival falls during Autumn season. It is a harvest festival celebrated after the first crops are harvested (similar to baisakhi in Punjab). Families gather during this period and eat together. After that, the younger take the blessings of elders and dance with friends.
- Bhai Jauntia: A festival observed by the women of this region where a sister prays for the betterment of her brother.
- Rath Yatra: Rath Yatra is celebrated in the town & villages of the district. Lord Jagannath, his elder brother lord Balabhadra and his younger sister Subhadra travel in a wooden car to their mausi mandir.
- Durga Puja: Durga Puja has been celebrated in public pandals in the town for more than half a century. It is one of the most celebrated festival locally in Jharsuguda. Most remarkable and favoured among these are specially Durga pandals of Sarbahal, Chowki para and Mangal Bazar and Puja by Sri Santimai Mukharjee in Chowki Para are major crowd pullers for their majestic and innovative pandals. Traditional Bengali crowd gathers in KaliMandir which is one of the oldest Durga Puja in Jharsuguda
- Ganesh Puja: Ganesh Chaturthi or Ganesh puja is also one of locally most celebrated festival which is a 10-day public celebration.
- Diwali and Chhat: It is celebrated with great pomp and show.
- Kirtan (Nama Yangya) (Brundamal, Sarbahal, Sahapada, Buromal and Chowki Para): People pray to Krishna and Rama.

=== Languages ===
Languages spoken in Jharsuguda Town (2011)
1. Odia (40.3%)
2. Sambalpuri (8.83%)
3. Hindi (24.4%)
4. Kisan (3.56%)
5. Bengali (2.93%)
6. Others (19.9%)

== Transport ==
Since the Colonial era, the city has had a relatively developed transportation network. Primary modes of transport are auto rickshaws, taxi and private and state operated buses.

The Jharsuguda Airport is operational since 2019 at Durlaga. It had an airstrip since British times, which is currently upgraded to a full-fledged airport. First flight from Jharsuguda took off in September 2018 after Prime Minister of India, Narendra Modi, inaugurated VSS Airport (Veer Surendra Sai Airport) on 22 September 2018.

On 28 February 2019, low cost airline Spicejet announced regional connectivity from Jhasurguda to various state capitals such as Kolkata, Hyderabad as well as with New Delhi under the UDAN (Ude Desh ka Aam Nagrik) regional connectivity scheme.

Jharsuguda railway station is an important railway junction on the Tatanagar–Bilaspur section of the Howrah-Nagpur-Mumbai line and the Jharsuguda-Vizianagaram line. The railway station comes under South Eastern Railway.

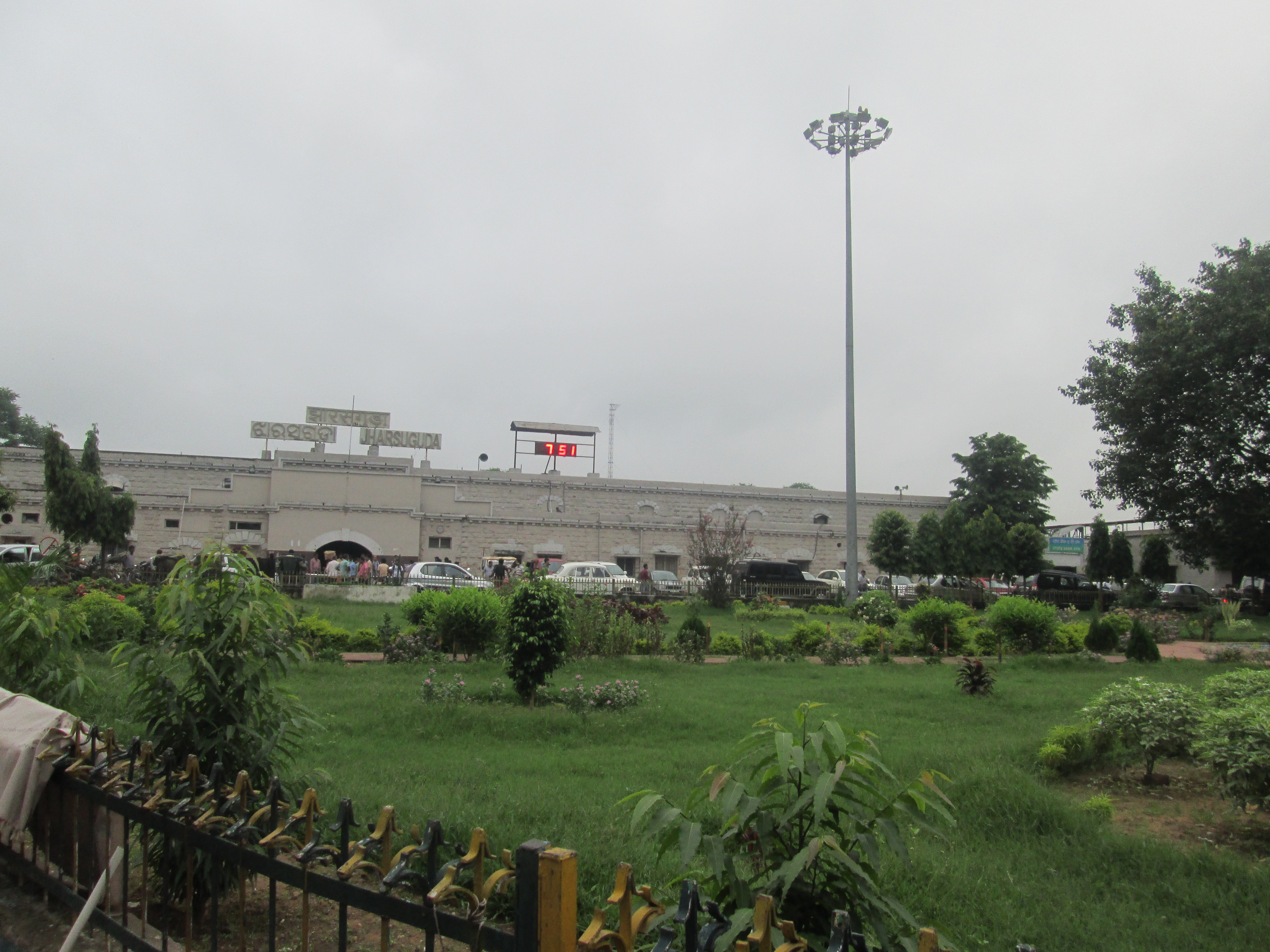
Jharsuguda Railway Station

Jharsuguda is connected to various towns of the states by State Highway 10 (now a part of Biju Expressway) and National Highway 49.

== Politics ==
The current Member of the Legislative Assembly from Jharsuguda Assembly Constituency is Tankadhar Tripathy, who won the seat in 2024. Jharsuguda is currently under Bargarh constituency of the Lok Sabha. This constituency came into existence in 2008 as a part of delimitation of parliamentary constituencies based on the recommendations of the Delimitation Commission of India in 2002. Jharsuguda was previously under the Deogarh constituency of the Lok Sabha. The current Member of Parliament from Bargarh is Suresh Pujari from the Bharatiya Janta Party, taking office in 2019.

== Education ==
The pre-collegiate medium of instruction in schools is predominantly English, Sambalpuri, Hindi and Odia. The medium of instruction in educational institutions after matriculation in colleges is English. Other medias of instruction also exist in Jharsuguda. Schools and colleges in Jharsuguda are mostly government-run, but schools run by private trusts and individuals also exist. The schools are affiliated with either the Odisha State Board under the Board of Secondary Education (BSE), Central Board of Secondary Education or Council of Higher Secondary Education (CHSE), Indian Certificate of Secondary Education (ICSE), Central Board of Secondary Education (CBSE). After completing 10 years of schooling in secondary education, students enroll in higher secondary school, specialising in one of three streams – arts, commerce or science.

In November 2016, the professional accounting body Institute of Chartered Accountants of India opened a branch at Jharsuguda. The biggest name in Jharsuguda district is Laxminarayan Mishra, who was a freedom fighter, writer, a nationalist during British raj and a politician from western Odisha.

== See also ==
- Jharsuguda (Odisha Vidhan Sabha constituency)
