= Jharsuguda district =

District in Odisha, India

- District of Odisha
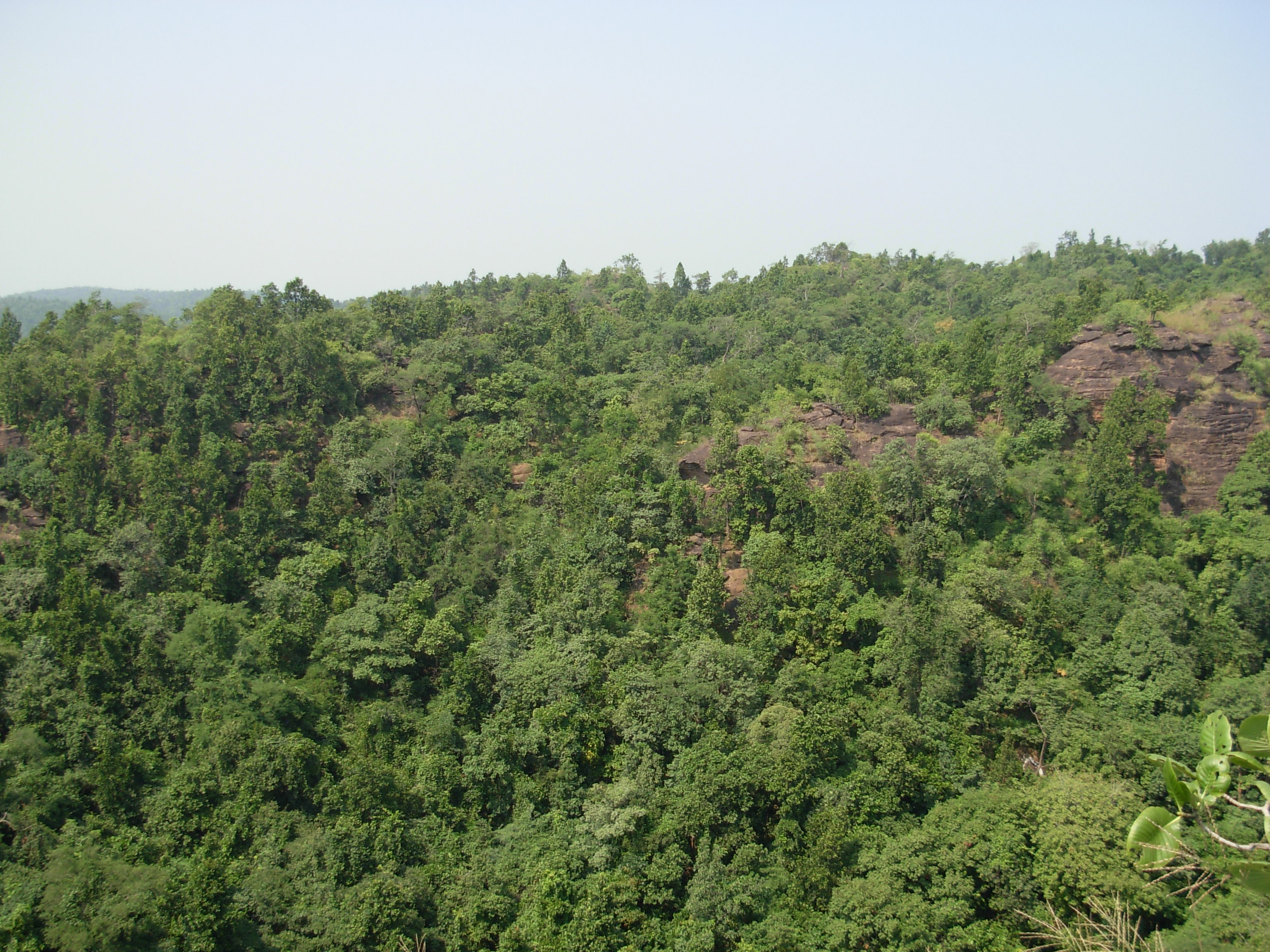
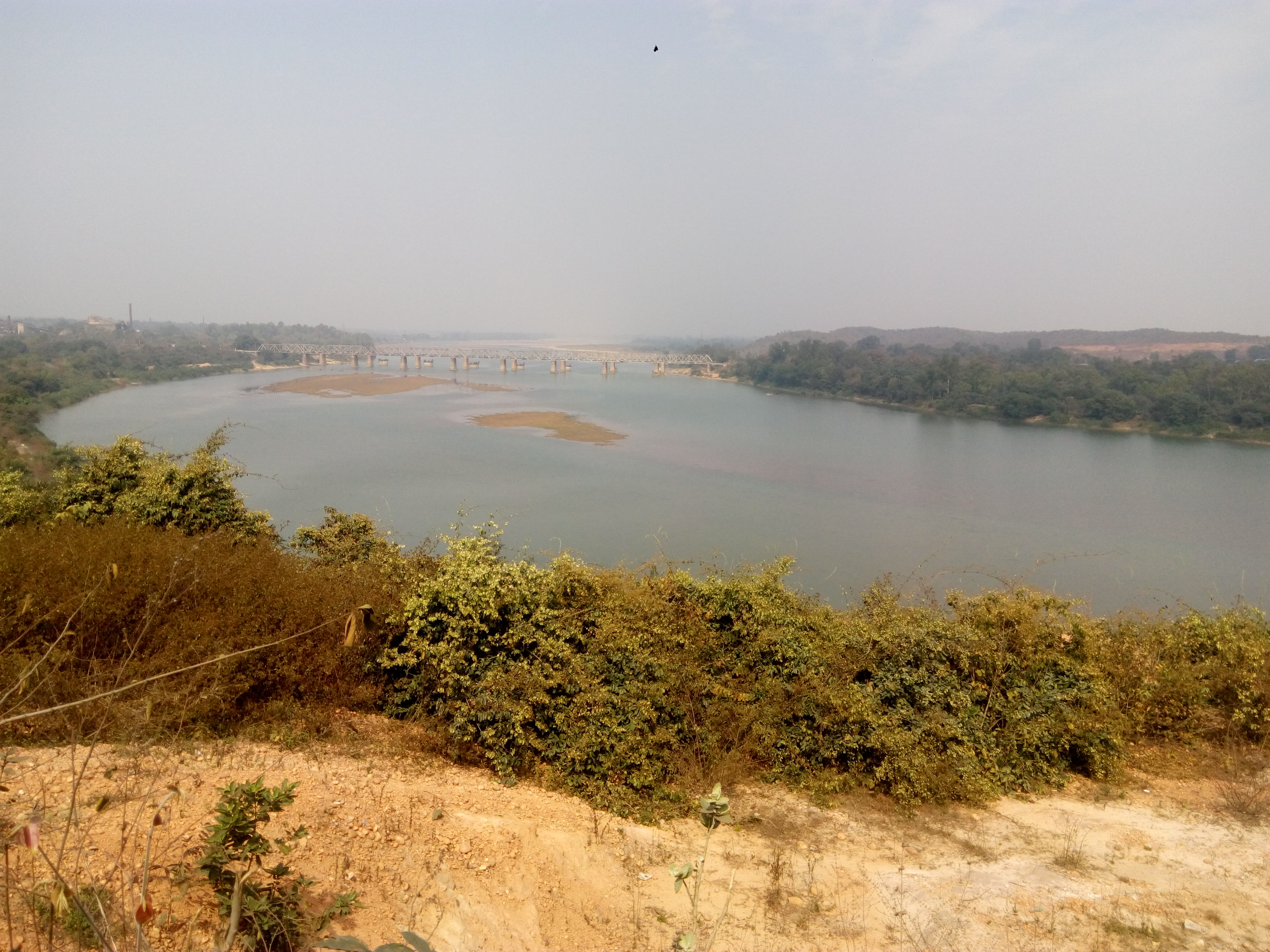
- Top: View of hills near Ullapgarh; Bottom: Ib River near Jharsuguda
- Interactive map of Jharsuguda district
- Coordinates: 21.85°N 84.016°E
- Country: India
- State: Odisha
- Headquarters: Jharsuguda

Government
  - Collector: Aboli Sunil Naravane, IAS
  - Divisional Forest Officer Cum Wildlife Warden: Sushant Kumar, IFS
  - Member of Lok Sabha: Suresh Pujari

Area
  - Total: 2,081 km^{2} (803 sq mi)

Population (2011)
  - Total: 579,505
  - Density: 278/km^{2} (720/sq mi)

Languages
  - Official: Odia, English
  - Local: Sambalpuri, Kurukh, Munda, Kharia
- Time zone: UTC+5:30 (IST)
- PIN: 768 201,2,3
- Vehicle registration: OD-23
- Nearest city: Sambalpur, Rourkela, Sundargarh
- Sex ratio: 1.057 ♂/♀
- Literacy: 71.4%
- Lok Sabha constituency: Bargarh
- Vidhan Sabha constituency: 2, 1.Brajarajnagar, 2.Jharsuguda
- Climate: Aw (Köppen)
- Precipitation: 1,527 mm (60.1 in)
- Avg. summer temperature: 46.7 °C (116.1 °F)
- Website: www.jharsuguda.nic.in

Jharsuguda district is a district in Odisha, India with Jharsuguda town as its headquarters. This region is rich in coal and other mineral reserves. Of late, many small and medium scale iron and steel units have been set up in the vicinity of Jharsuguda town, giving impetus to the industrial growth of the district.

== Major tribes ==
This district has the major tribal populations and among them important tribes are Sabara, Kisan, Kurukh, Bhuiyan, Munda, Santal. This district has unique diversity in terms of tribal culture, language and other focal culture. Kurukh people speak their mother tongue Kurukh language with Sadri language. Munda people speak their Ho language and Kisan people speak their Kisan dialect and Kharia speak their Kharia. Sadri and local Odia dialect is also quite popular among tribal communities.

== Geography ==
Jharsuguda district has three urban agglomerations, municipalities of Jharsuguda town and Brajrajnagar and municipality of Belpahar. Jharsuguda has its own airport named Veer Surendra Sai Airport. The district is bordered by Raigarh district of Chhattisgarh to the west, Sundergarh district to the north, Sambalpur district to the east and southeast and Bargarh district to the southwest. The district is mainly open plain, with some hills in the north.

== Divisions ==
The district comprises five blocks, primary being Lakhanpur, Kolabira, Laikera, Kirmira and Jharsuguda.

Belpahar sub-division includes 12 villages and two town. The most populous villages are Lakhanpur & Chhualiberna. The main festival of Chhualiberna is Narsingh Puja which held on month of December. Brajrajnagar is also famous for Rampur's Ramchandi mandir on bank of the Ib river. Rampur Colliery is famous for the Mahanadi Coalfields Limited, the oldest coal mines in India. Another one most popular gram panchayat is Hirma, which is under Jharsuguda block; it is 10 km (6.2 mi) from district headquarter, and the main festival is Samalei Bali Jatra (Kandagarh).

== Economy ==
There are lot of coal mines situated in this area.

Brajrajnagar is an industrial town, near Ib Valley Coalfield of Mahanadi Coalfields Limited. Brajrajnagar also boasts of a large paper mill, i.e., Orient Paper Mills of the Birla Group of Industries. However, this mill has been defunct for more than a decade now. Brajrajnagar is also a tourist hub with several large temples including Brajeswari temple near railway station, Ramchandi Mandir, Laxmi Narayan Mandir, Jagannath Temple, Shiv Mandir in Lamtibahal, Shani Mandir in college road, Mukteswar Temple in hill top colony, Shiv Mandir in Rampur as well as Shiv Temple of G.M. Office, Aditya Mandir in jharsuguda road, Mangala and Tarini Mandir in college road.

In 2006 the Ministry of Panchayati Raj named Jharsuguda one of the country's 250 most backward districts (out of a total of 640). It is one of the 19 districts in Odisha currently receiving funds from the Backward Regions Grant Fund Programme (BRGF).

The district once had an airport during World War II. In 2018 this airport was modernised into Jharsuguda Airport.

== Demographics ==
Historical population
Year	Pop.	±% p.a.
1901	142,665	—
1911	165,203	+1.48%
1921	172,699	+0.44%
1931	192,997	+1.12%
1941	217,378	+1.20%
1951	235,313	+0.80%
1961	247,185	+0.49%
1971	292,876	+1.71%
1981	368,251	+2.32%
1991	446,726	+1.95%
2001	514,853	+1.43%
2011	579,505	+1.19%

Religions in Jharsuguda district (2011)
Religion	Percent
Hinduism	95.53%
Islam	2.21%
Christianity	1.81%
Other or not stated	0.45%

Languages of Jharsuguda district (2011)
1. Sambalpuri (42.3%)
2. Odia (27.4%)
3. Hindi (9.59%)
4. Kisan (6.42%)
5. Munda (2.21%)
6. Kharia (1.86%)
7. Chhattisgarhi (1.43%)
8. Bengali (1.27%)
9. Sadri (1.11%)
10. Others (6.43%)

According to the 2011 census Jharsuguda district had a population of 579,505, roughly equal to the nation of Solomon Islands or the US state of Wyoming. This gives it a ranking of 530th in India (out of a total of 640). The district had a population density of 274 inhabitants per square kilometre (710/sq mi). Its population growth rate over the decade 2001–2011 was 13.69%. Jharsuguda had a sex ratio of 951 females for every 1,000 males, and a literacy rate of 78.36%. 39.89% of the population lives in urban areas. Scheduled Castes and Scheduled Tribes made up 18.05% and 30.50% of the population respectively.

At the time of the 2011 Census of India, 42.26% of the population spoke Sambalpuri, 27.42% Odia, 9.59% Hindi, 6.42% Kisan, 2.21% Mundari, 1.86% Kharia, 1.43% Chhattisgarhi, 1.27% Bengali and 1.11% Sadri as their mother tongue.

== Notable people ==
- Hemananda Biswal: Chief Minister of Odisha and a veteran Congress leader
- Kishore Kumar Mohanty: Speaker of Odisha Assembly and veteran BJD leader

== See also ==
- Adhapara
- Jharsuguda
