= Young Tinker Foundation =

Indian non-profit organization

- Founded: 2015; 11 years ago
- Founders: Anil Pradhan; Vaishali Sharma
- Type: Non-profit organisation
- Purpose: STEM education, rural education, hands-on learning
- Locations: Bhubaneswar, Odisha, India; Hyderabad, Telangana, India
- Region served: India
- Website: youngtinker.org
- Formerly called: Navonmesh Prasar Foundation

Young Tinker Foundation (also known as the Young Tinker Educational Foundation) is a non-profit organisation based in India. Through practical, hands-on learning, it aims to expand access to STEM (Science, Technology, Engineering, and Mathematics) education in underprivileged, rural, and tribal communities across India.

== History ==
Young Tinker Foundation was founded in 2015 by Anil Pradhan, then a Civil Engineering undergraduate at Veer Surendra Sai University of Technology (VSSUT), Burla, after he returned to his home village, Baral, on the river island of 42 Mouza in Cuttack district, Odisha. Finding that the educational conditions in the village have changed little over the preceding decade, Pradhan established the International Public School for Rural Innovation (IPSRI), initially operating under a tin shed with three students and offering free instruction in science, technology, and innovation.

IPSRI and its programmes were organised under the Navonmesh Prasar Foundation (NPF), the name Navonmesh comes from Sanskrit, roughly meaning new beginnings or new light. Vaishali Sharma, a fellow VSSUT student, co-founded the organisation and helped develop its early curriculum.

Pradhan and Sharma turned down traditional engineering jobs after graduating in 2017 in order to devote all of their attention to the project. The Young Tinker Foundation (YTF) was later created by expanding and rebranding the Navonmesh Prasar Foundation. Before joining full-time in 2022, Sharma temporarily supported the campaign financially by working as a software engineer.

== Programs & Activities ==
=== Young Tinker Spaces (YTS) ===
Young Tinker Spaces are innovation hubs run in partnership with schools & colleges. The foundation runs these spaces to equip the students with the necessary tools & provide hands-on experience for project-based learning. As of 2025, more than 200 Young Tinker Spaces had been established across India.

=== Tinker-on-Wheels (ToW) ===
Tinker-on-Wheels (ToW) is a mobile makerspace programme that uses an autorickshaw to transport a fully equipped science and innovation laboratory to schools, particularly in areas lacking permanent laboratory infrastructure. The mobile unit provides instruction in robotics, 3D printing, artificial intelligence, machine learning, IoT, coding, and design thinking, delivered through the foundation's FATAC framework (Feel, Align, Think, Act, Check). Each ToW unit is designed to reach more than 10,000 students annually. The programme was expanded to Uttar Pradesh in April 2025.

The foundation also runs the Young Tinker Fellowship and IDEAS Programme.

== Awards & Recognition ==
- National Youth Award (awarded to Anil Pradhan in 2021)
- World Rank 3 + Videography Award, NASA Human Exploration Rover Challenge (High School Division in 2021)
- Rohini Nayyar Prize for Outstanding Contribution to Rural Development (2024)
- Forbes 30 Under 30 Asia – Social Impact (2025)

== See also ==
- Atal Tinkering Labs
- NASA Human Exploration Rover Challenge
- Veer Surendra Sai University of Technology
