= Western Odisha Development Council–sponsored medical colleges =

The Western Odisha Development Council sponsors upcoming medical colleges (also called WODC Medical Colleges) in Balangir, Kalahandi and Sundergarh district of Western Odisha. These medical colleges are partly sponsored by the Western Odisha Development Council in India.

== Sardar Rajas Medical College, Hospital & Research Centre (Bhawanipatna) ==
For a medical college at Bhawanipatna, an MoU was signed among Selvam Educational and Charitable Trust, Tamil Nadu, and Western Odisha Development Council (WODC). After a long public agitation the construction work for the project was started. For the Rs 100- crore project, it was agreed that WODC would chip in with Rs 10 crore in eight installments on the basis of progress of work and State Government would provide 25 acres of land on lease. Later in 2013 the admission was started for this medical college after obtaining permission from MCI. Students found various deficiencies in the college hampering their education and clinical learning. The hospital was never functional but doctors for lease were hired to be shown in MCI inspection and patients from nearby villages were gathered to show them as crowd visiting, making it a good show for taking clean chit from MCI. This was also brought into the notice of CBI and there was a trail for this. The students were 124 in number, started protesting which later on attracted the attention of local public of the district and the college was declared closed by the state government as there was a case pending at High Court of Odisha filed by the students earlier and the litigation between everyone went to the Supreme Court of India eventually. The agitation was led by M Sameer Krishna Reddy and supported by Subhalaxmi Dash, Neushree Pani, Praveen Kumar Sahu, Liwa Pattnaik, Ajit Ku. Dash, Sarada Prasad Swain and Ankita Swain. Local leaders were Shri A. K. Nanda, Shri Pradipta Kumar Naik, Shri Bhakta Charan Dash, Shri Himanshu Meher, Shri Chinmaya Behera, Shri Samanta Khamari, Shri Badri Pattnaik various other leaders of the district were participating for the same in full dedication. Various means of protest and lawful steps were taken with the support of parents and local leaders. Finally the students were settled at various colleges in the state by the direction of Hon'ble Supreme Court of India and the local people got a new medical college sanctioned by the state government forcibly.

== Balangir Medical College ==
Earlier it was reported that the RVS Educational Trust will set up the proposed Medical College and Hospital in Balangir. It was also mentioned that a high-level committee, headed by the Development Commissioner of Odisha has given green signal to the Coimbatore-based RVS Group. The CM of Odisha had asked the Western Odisha Development Council (WODC) to go ahead with the memorandum of understanding. However, it did not work out. It was further reported that the Odisha government plans to set up a Government medical college at Balangir as the PPP method is not working.

== Hi-Tech Medical Medical College (Rourkela) ==
It is a part of HI-TECH Group of institutions, which is probably going to start in 2012. It has 100 M.B.B.S seats (Affiliated by Sambalpur University) and is approved by MCI to give admission to 100 eligible students qualified in OJEE 2012. It has 10% reservation seats for Western Odisha candidates and the college will be sponsored by Western Odisha Development Council(WODC).

== See also ==
- Western Odisha
- Kalahandi Balangir Koraput
