= Kosal movement =

Movement for proposed separate Kosal state in India

The Kosal state movement is an effort by people of the Western Odisha region of India to secede from the state of Odisha. Organizations like Western Odisha Yuva Manch (WOYM), Kosal Youth Coordination Committee (KYCC), Kosal State Coordination Committee (KSCC), Koshal Sena, Koshal Mukti Bahini and Koshal Mukti Morcha are mainly leading this.

== Origin of the movement ==
The demand for secession from the state of Odisha arose mostly because of the prolonged underdevelopment and backwardness of this region. Pro-separatist groups have repeatedly claimed the state government is not doing enough for the development of undeveloped districts of western Odisha.

To develop the western Odisha region, the state government has established a Western Odisha Development Council (WODC). A significant budget is allotted to this council from the total budget of Odisha. But the WODC headquarter is located in the state capital Bhubaneswar rather than in Western Odisha.

== Reasons for the campaign ==
=== Poverty ===
The incidence of chronic poverty in western Odisha, coupled with government failures to address its rising trends have been the most important factor for the demand for a separate state in Odisha. A majority of the region's population lack the purchasing power to buy sufficient food each day. In the backward districts of Kosal region—Boudh, Sonepur, Balangir and Nuapada more than 60% of people live below the poverty line. Recurrent droughts, inadequate irrigation and uneven land distribution have made Kosal a "hunger belt" in Odisha since Independence. The results included large-scale deaths from starvation, child-selling, out-migration and malnourishment.

=== Industrialization and environmental degradation ===
Western Odisha also experiences mining and environmental degradation and tribal displacement. It is reported that farmers from more than eight district depend on water from Hirakud reservoir. Farmers are angry because industries are using a huge amount of this water, leading to frequent protests.

=== Access to health services ===
There are four government medical colleges in this region, which are in Sambalpur, Balangir, Kalahandi and Sundergarh. The first college was (Veer Surendra Sai Institute of Medical Sciences and Research) in western Odisha.

Later, a medical college at Balangir named Bhima Bhoi Medical College and Hospital was started in the year 2018. Also two medical college was established at Sundergarh and Bhawanipatna.

=== Language ===
The major language of the area is Sambalpuri. It is variously seen either as a dialect of Odia or as a language in its own right, and has so far eluded recognition by the state or union governments.

== History ==
The demand of a separate state is more than three decades old. Lawyer of Supreme Court Shree Prem Ram Dubey was first person to feel the need of a separate state; he submitted a memorandum to the President of India. Local parties from Jharkhand claimed inclusion of Sambalpur and Sundergarh District into Jharkhand. Dubey formed the Kosal Sammelani, which urged the state and union government not to enter into any negotiation with any claimant for the transfer of any part of proposed state. Dubey asserted that while Punjab has only 46,000 km^{2}, western Odisha has 75,000 sq. km and a population of one crore, still was not provided statehood. He also published the first newspaper for the region "Kosal Khabar" and constituted the "Kosal Sena". He wrote the books Hame Kosli Hamar Bhasa Kosli and "Why Kosal State". In 'Kosal Khabar' he propounded the solutions to carve a separate state to end the discrimination by coastal people on the Kosalites. He was spearhead in most of the protest programmes. The movement was independently supported by former BJP MLA Balgopal Mishra. As reported in "The Indian Express" the Odisha PCC president Hemananda Biswal had strongly opposed the demand for a separate state. Addressing the media, he told in Bhubaneswar that, "the Congress party is committed to the establishment of the Western Odisha Development Council (WODC) and the Bill in this connection is pending before the legislature". Balgopal Mishra reacted to it saying "there is a growing demand for a separate state; it was regrettable that the newly elected MP and some legislators of Bolangir district had failed to see the writing on the wall".

Mishra is famous for his "Kosal Mukti Rath" to generate public opinion in favour of his demand. He generated a lot of public support for a separate state despite stiff opposition from the ruling party. Sapan Mishra of Sambalpur, along with some dedicated youth, chalked out a route map for 'Kosal Mukti Rath' traversing the region, which ultimately made it a mass movement from a class movement. Later, the "Kosal Rayej Kriyanusthan Committee", which fought Odisha State Assembly & Lok Sabha Election for the cause, was formed.

In 2004 the Deputy Prime Minister L.K. Advani told reporters in Balangir that India could consider the demand for a separate Kosal state only if the Odisha Assembly passed a resolution in this regard, claiming "a consensus is needed in this matter".

=== 2005-2009 ===
Various political parties demanded the formation of a new Kosal state composed of the most backward districts of Western Odisha; the call was led by political parties and organisations like Kosal Kranti Dal, Koshli Ekta Manch, Kosal Party, Odisha Sanskrutika Samaj, Kosal Rajya Sangharsha Samiti, Veer Surendra Sai Manch and All Kosal Students Union (AKSU).

For the first time, a sitting MP from the Indian National Congress party (Sambalpur) and former minister Shri Amarnath Pradhan warned that "If the State Government continued to neglect us then we will not hesitate to demand a separate state".

In 2009, Sambalpur University Student Union, Rajendra College Balangir Student Union and Balangir Women's College Union supported demands for a separate state. In addition, the bar associations in Sambalpur and Balangir demanded the formation of a separate state. Frequently, bandhs (strikes or acts of civil disobedience) are observed in parts of Western Odisha demanding a separate state. Activists have distributed maps of the proposed Koshal state and torn up the Odisha map as a symbolic declaration of separation from Odisha.

On 23 December 2009, thousands of members of the Kosal Kranti Dal (KKD) staged a demonstration near the Odisha assembly building. The separatist supporters marched on the main street of the capital city Bhubaneswar. Later they gathered to hear dozens of leaders speak about the apathy of the state and central governments towards Western Odisha. According to The Statesman, the protest dharna (peaceful sit-in) was led by the KKD's president Pramod Kumar Misra; other leaders of the party addressed the protestors, exhorting them to launch a mass movement for separate statehood. Mishra said, "We have separate language. Our culture and traditions are different. Our regions are the poorest in India despite having huge mineral and forest wealth. Only a separate state can improve the condition of our people."

On 27 December 2009, The Pioneer published an article saying senior BJD leader and Minister Ananga Udaya Singh Deo was opposed to the creation of a separate state. Addressing the BJD foundation day in Bhubaneswar, Singh Deo said the demand for a separate state gained momentum because the past Congress governments had neglected their interests. "They had only allotted ₹1 crore for the region's development. But our BJD Government gave ₹50 crore for the first time to the Western Odisha Development Council (WODC) and then enhanced it to ₹100 crore", he said.

=== 2010 ===
After this the members of All Kosal Students' union, led by convener Dolamani Pradhan, held a demonstration before the Collectorate in Balangir town protesting against the anti-Kosal remark by AU Singh Deo, WODC's chairman Prof. Niranjan Panda and Chief Minister of Odisha Naveen Patnaik and later burning their effigies.

Indo-Asian News Service reported that rail services in Odisha were affected on 10 January 2010 when activists of Kosal Kranti Dal blocked the tracks to press their demand for a separate state. Hundreds of activists blocked tracks at many places in Western Odisha, including at Balangir, Bargarh, Boinda, Rourkela and Kesinga. Similar protests were also reported in Sambalpur and Jharsuguda, where separatists demanded a "separate state any cost". It was also reported that more than 100 protesters courted arrest at Balangir town and the party leader Pramod Mishra said they will hold more agitations in the coming days. Pramod Mishra also said, "We were forced to merge with Odisha in 1948. What this region has got after 60 years of merger? Only acute poverty and backwardness." On Tuesday, 19 January 2010 The Pioneer BBSR edition reported about the allegation of CPI(M) State secretary Janardan Pati that the indifference on the parts of the two main political parties in the State, the BJD and the Congress, over the issue is encouraging the demands for separate states. It was reported that members of the KKD and All Kosal Students' Union held a Raasta roko (roadblock) at different places on the Bargarh-Borigumma section of National Highway 201 and at Puintala on the Khurda-Balangir section of NH-224 for three hours from 10 am to 1 pm on 14 February 2010.

Led by the KKD and the Koshal State Coordination Committee (KSCC), it has been decided that 26th day of August every year will be observed as Kosal Bandh Day. From 2012 until 2015, the same was being observed in the region for demanding of a new separate state. All ten districts take part in the bandh.

=== 2013 ===
"Now Union Government and Government of Odisha should take immediate steps for creation of separate Kosal state, otherwise stir will intensify."

— Nirmal Das, spokesperson of Kosal Kranti Dal addressing the Bandh on Monday, 26 August 2013

"Mishandling of long pending demand for establishment of a bench of High Court in Western Odisha by the Odisha government is fueling the separate statehood issue."

— Sriballav Panigrahi, former Congress MP of Deogarh Lok Sabha constituency.

On 26 August 2013, a 12-hour Kosal Bandh was observed after a call given by the KSCC demanding separate Kosal state. Normal life in Sambalpur was paralysed as rail and road communications, shops and offices remained closed for the day. At a meeting held in Balangir on 10 August 2013, it was decided that there would be a bandh on 26 August 2013 in Western Odisha.

The one-day shutdown evoked large response; shops, businesses and educational institutions remained closed while people took to rallies and staged demonstrations at many places. They also picketed central and state government offices, banks and other financial institutions. Agitators obstructed trains and highways; as result passengers train remained stranded. Both government and private buses remained off the road. Fuel stations, cinema halls, malls and other commercial centres remained closed. KKD, Kosal Raijya Kriyanushtan Committee, Kosal Sena and Kosal Parishad had jointly called for a bandh in the region.

=== 2014 ===
On 26 August 2014, the region led by the KKD conducted their annual bandh. The Kosal coordination committee organized a motor cycle rally from Samaleswari temple of Bargarh town on 24 August 2014 to create awareness among locals regarding the campaign and ordered the bandh.

=== 2015 ===
The Balangir wing of Koshal State Coordination Committee (KSCC) took out a motorcycle rally in the town on Monday to alert the people to participate in the bandh. Gopalji Panigrahi of Balangir Action Committee said the fight for a state will continue until the demand is fulfilled by the Government of India.

=== 2016 ===
"We oppose the word 'Koshali'. The language of the region is known as 'Sambalpuri'. However, efforts are being made to change the name of the language to 'Koshali' on the pretext of a separate Koshal state. We do not oppose the demand of creation of a separate state but, we cannot accept the change of the name of the language."

— Deepak Panda, joint convener of Hirakhand Samukhya addressing their oppose to the Bandh

"In 1936 and 1948, the political leaders of Odisha merged our land with the State through a conspiracy. We are demanding a separate State as per the provisions of Article 2 and 3 of the Constitution. The only solution to the problems like regional imbalance, discrimination in education, employment, industrialisation and development is formation of a separate State".

— Pramod Kumar Mishra, Koshalbadi leader of Balangir

On 3 March 2016, members of the KKD and people of Western Odisha, led by the Balangir district president Bharat Prusti and general secretary of the All Kosal Students' Union Dolamani Pradhan, protested against the "continuous neglect and exploitation" by the Odisha government and demanded formation of a separate state. The demonstrators tore a map of Odisha and burnt a compact disc containing the song Bande Utkala Janani. The KKD also organised a massive rally and meeting, which was attended by delegates from eleven districts of Western Odisha. The president of KKD Pramod Mishra said the people had gathered to protest against their continuous exploitation by the successive Governments at Bhubaneswar.

The KSCC, composed of representatives of organisations in 10 districts, has called a 12-hour bandh in Western Odisha on 26 August 2016. The vehicular movement was also normal in the Sambalpur town despite the bandh call. Despite the KSCC's call, many organisations of Sambalpur including Hirakhand Samukhya, Sambalpur District Bar Association, Sambalpuri Bhasha Sanskruti Parishad and Bharati Samaj had asked people not to take part in the bandh. The dawn-to-dusk shutdown observed by the KKD evoked a partial response in Sundargarh district, but normal life was disrupted.

== See also ==
- Kosalananda Kavya
- Prem Ram Dubey
- Kosal Kranti Dal
- KOSHAL MUKTI SENA
