= Kosal Kranti Dal =

Kosal Kranti Dal (KKD) is a regional political outfit of Odisha with particular focus on western Odisha which is known for its separatist movement for a separate Koshal state as per article 2 & 3 of Indian Constitution. KKD is mainly focusing on the creation of a separate Kosal state by the bifurcation of Odisha.The KKD was formed in the year 2007 with veteran Koshalbadi leader and potential advocate Pramod Mishra became its first president. Later on Bunde Dharua of Jharsuguda became the president. Now KKD central office is located at Jharsuguda and Narayana Mohapatra is the president.

== History ==
As reported by various news agencies KKD was floated in Odisha in 2007. The Party secretary Mr. Baidyanath Mishra said that KKD had been recognized by the Election Commission. Since 2007 it is fighting assembly and lok sabha elections. Mishara announced that "the party would fight for a separate state comprising ten districts of western Odisha and Athmallik sub-division of Angul district as he alleged that the area remained neglected by successive governments during the past 60 years."

As of 2013, it is quite active conducting strikes in the proposed 10 Western Odisha districts, which is widely being supported by the local public. It has intensified its demand in the wake of Telangana being granted statehood.

== Main demands ==
- Separate Kosal state comprising Western Odisha districts and Athmallik subdivision.
- Recognition of Sambalpuri language and culture.
- Development of Western Odisha with regards to education, agriculture, infrastructure and health services.
- Recognition of history of Kosal.
- Demand for second State reorganisation panel.

== See also ==
- Kosal state movement
- Kosli language movement
- Kosalananda Kavya
- Prem Ram Dubey
