= Sujeet Kumar (politician) =

Indian politician

Member of Parliament, Rajya Sabha
- Incumbent
- Assumed office 4 April 2026

Chairperson, Parliamentary Standing Committee on Personnel, Public Grievances, Law and Justice
- Incumbent
- Assumed office 03 October 2026

Member of Parliament, Rajya Sabha
- In office 3 April 2020 – 6 September 2024
- President: Droupadi Murmu
- Prime Minister: Narendra Modi
- Constituency: Odisha

Personal details
- Born: 17 November 1975 (age 51) Bhawanipatna, Odisha, India
- Party: Bharatiya Janata Party
- Other political affiliations: Biju Janata Dal (until 2024)
- Spouse: Swati Kumar
- Children: Shreyas Kumar (son)
- Parents: Satya Narayan Seth (father); Kusum Devi (mother)
- Education: Harvard University, John F. Kennedy School of Government; University of Oxford - Said Business School; VSSUT Burla
- Website: https://www.sujeetkofficial.com/

Sujeet Kumar (born 17 November 1975) is an Indian politician of the Bharatiya Janata Party, representing Odisha in the Rajya Sabha (The Council of States or The Upper House of the Indian Parliament) and is currently serving his third term. He also serves as the Chairman of Parliamentary Standing Committee on Personnel, Public Grievances, Law and Justice. In addition to his political career, Kumar is a lawyer and a trained arbitrator, practicing in the Supreme Court of India, as well as in various High Courts and Tribunals. He has held several significant positions, including Chairman of the Committee on Petitions in the Rajya Sabha, where he was one of the youngest members to chair a Parliamentary Committee. Previously, he served as the Advisor to the Special Development Council (SDC) of the Government of Odisha, with a rank equivalent to Chief Secretary, and as the Special Secretary of the Odisha State Planning Board. These roles involved senior-level policy planning and development responsibilities within the state government. He recently published a book titled "AI on Trial" along with Tauseef Alam.

== Education ==
Sujeet Kumar pursued his education in his hometown of Bhawanipatna, situated in the Kalahandi districtof Odisha. He later earned a Bachelor of Engineering (BE) degree from Veer Surendra Sai University of Technology (formerly UCE Burla) and a Bachelor of Laws (LLB) degree from Sambalpur University.

Kumar was awarded the inaugural Skoll Scholarship for Social Entrepreneurship, which facilitated his pursuit of an MBA at Saïd Business School, University of Oxford. He further enhanced his academic credentials by completing a Master in Public Administration (MPA) degree from the Harvard Kennedy School at Harvard University.

== Career ==
Kumar began his professional career as a software engineer with Infosys Technologies Ltd. He later transitioned to the development sector, working with the United Nations Development Programme (UNDP) on its "ICT for Development" project in Odisha, which aimed to introduce digital technology to remote areas of the state. Subsequently, Kumar joined the World Economic Forum (WEF) in Geneva, Switzerland, where he was involved in designing and managing significant projects.

In 2011, Sujeet Kumar returned to India and established the Kalinga Kusum Foundation, a social enterprise, as well as LexMantra LLP, a business and legal consulting firm. He continues to serve as an advisor and mentor to these organizations, offering strategic direction and guidance.

Kumar's career spans multiple sectors, including corporate, government, and development work at international, national, and grassroots levels. He has participated in various conferences and forums both in India and internationally. In recognition of his contributions as a policymaker and legal entrepreneur, as well as his work at the intersection of law, technology, development, and public policy, Kumar received the Youth Inspiration Award in 2017. His connection with the academics has led him to be adjunct and visiting faculty and various universities and institution of India and abroad.

On 22 December 2021, Kumar was unanimously appointed as the convenor of the All Party Indian Parliamentary Forum for Tibet. He is also a founding member of the Formosa Club Indo-Pacific chapter and serves as the co-chair of the Inter-Parliamentary Alliance on China (IPAC).

== Legal Practice ==
Sujeet Kumar is a practicing legal professional, working in the Supreme Court of India, various High Courts, and Tribunals. He also established a law firm LexMantra that provides legal services to domestic and international corporations, multinational companies, multilateral and government agencies, investors, and individuals.

Kumar holds memberships in several professional organizations, including being a Life Member of the Orissa High Court Bar Association, the International Bar Association, the International Centre for Alternative Dispute Resolution (ICADR), the Indian Council of Arbitration (ICA), and the Construction Industry Arbitration Council (CIAC), Indian Institute of Public Administration (IIPA), Indian Law Institute (ILI), IIPA, International Bar Association, Harvard Club of India & Ox-Bridge Society of India, the Supreme Court of India Bar Association, and serves as a Patron Member of the Bar Association of India (BAI).

== Publication ==
=== Book ===
Kumar has authored a book 'AI on Trial' that was released on 4 April 2025 by the then vice-president of India. It is a book that examines the relationship between artificial intelligence and contemporary legal systems. It discusses the emerging questions of accountability, liability, and governance associated with the development and use of AI technologies. Across its seven chapters, the book outlines key principles of AI, approaches to assigning responsibility, and various legal challenges arising from autonomous decision-making.

=== Op-Eds ===
Kumar has authored a range of opinion articles addressing public policy, governance, foreign affairs, legal reform, and socio-economic issues in India. His writings cover diverse themes, including the need for strengthened accountability frameworks in Indian legislative processes, the relevance of the Dalai Lama's teachings in contemporary times, and discussions on India's long-term national development trajectory.

His op-eds also examine evidence-based policy approaches, the role of technology in democratic systems, and the evolving dynamics of India–Taiwan relations. Several pieces focus on India's regional diplomacy, climate policy, and soft power, as well as perspectives on addiction treatment, consumer safety in the cosmetics sector, and constitutional questions relating to the separation of powers.

Other notable contributions analyze geopolitical developments, including Pakistan's economic and security landscape, the implications of caste census data, and debates around inclusivity in policymaking. Collectively, his writings reflect engagement with domestic and international policy debates, governance challenges, and India's position in the global context.

== Advocacy ==
=== Advocacy for Bharat Ratna for His Holiness the Dalai Lama ===
Kumar has advocated for Bharat Ratna to His Holiness Dalai Lama. Sujeet Kumar has served as the Convener of the All Party Indian Parliamentary Forum for Tibet (APIPFT) since December 2021. The APIPFT is a cross-party group in the Indian Parliament that brings together lawmakers from various political parties to advocate for the Tibetan cause and promote solidarity with the Tibetan community in India. Kumar has been a vocal advocate for the conferment of the Bharat Ratna, India's highest civilian award, on the 14th Dalai Lama, Tenzin Gyatso.

== International Engagement ==
Kumar is actively involved in international parliamentary diplomacy, with a primary focus on human rights in Tibet, Indo-Pacific security, and technology governance. He has represented India in various multilateral forums and serves in leadership roles within several inter-parliamentary organizations. Kumar recently launched the Parliamentary Forum for 'Tech Diplomacy' fostering collaboration between legislators on the responsible and inclusive usage of emerging technologies.

Kumar has consistently engaged with international representatives and institutions on matters concerning India's domestic policies and international stance. He has firmly opposed what he considers to be misrepresentations of India's internal affairs on international platforms. In 2026, Kumar wrote to US Congressman Riley M. Moore, rejecting his criticism of India's proposed Foreign Contribution (Regulation) Amendment Bill, 2026, and asserting that the proposed amendments do not target any particular religion or community. He also wrote to the United States Commission on International Religious Freedom (USCIRF) regarding its remarks on Sharjeel Imam. Through these interventions, Kumar has emphasised the importance of presenting India's legislative and constitutional matters accurately in international discourse.

=== Tibet and Indo-Pacific ===
On December 22, 2021, Kumar was appointed as the Convener of the All-Party Indian Parliamentary Forum for Tibet (APIPFT). Following his appointment, he undertook an official visit to the Tibetan Parliament-in-Exile in Dharamshala to strengthen legislative coordination between Indian and Tibetan representatives and discuss strategic advocacy with the Tibetan leadership.

As Convener of the APIPFT, Kumar delivered the keynote address at the 8th World Parliamentarians' Convention on Tibet in Washington, D.C., held on June 22–23, 2022. He participated in panels discussing human rights violations and religious repression in Tibet, engaging with international figures such as then-US House Speaker Nancy Pelosi, Sikyong Penpa Tsering, and Congressman Jim McGovern. He has also talk at Copenhagen Democracy Summit 2022 on Standing up to China's Authoritarianism - Parliamentary Perspective.

He continued this advocacy at the 9th World Parliamentarians' Convention on Tibet held in Tokyo from June 2–4, 2025. Serving on the drafting committee, he spoke on the implementation of the "Resolve Tibet Act" and worked with legislators, including Canadian Minister Arif Virani and Austrian MEP Hannes Heide, to adopt the Tokyo Declaration and Action Plan.

From September 12–14, 2022, Kumar attended the Inter-Parliamentary Alliance on China (IPAC) Annual Summit in Washington, D.C. Addressing an assembly of legislators from over 30 countries, he outlined India's strategic perspective on border tensions along the Line of Actual Control. He held discussions with US Senators Bob Menendez and Marco Rubio and UK MP Iain Duncan Smith regarding the preservation of Tibetan culture and the security of Taiwan within a free Indo-Pacific framework.

Expanding his engagement in the region, Kumar co-founded the Indo-Pacific chapter of the Formosa Club. From October 2–12, 2022, he joined a parliamentary delegation to Taipei, Taiwan, where he met with President Tsai Ing-wen and Foreign Minister Joseph Wu. The delegation's agenda focused on strengthening the India-Taiwan strategic partnership, particularly in the areas of semiconductor cooperation, democratic governance, and cultural ties.

Recently, Kumar was nominated to represent India at the Global Conference on AI governance in Kuala Lumpur where he advocated for India's vision in governance of emerging technology and the pathway to Viksit Bharat.

=== Inter-Parliamentary Delegations and Initiatives ===
Kumar has represented the Parliament of India at several significant international summits. From January 8–10, 2023, he was a member of the Indian delegation to the 13th Plenary Session of the Asian Parliamentary Assembly in Antalya, Turkey, where discussions centered on regional security and sustainable development.

From March 23–27, 2024, he accompanied Rajya Sabha Deputy Chairman Harivansh as part of the Indian delegation to the 148th Inter-Parliamentary Union (IPU) Assembly in Geneva, Switzerland. During the assembly, he participated in bilateral meetings with counterparts such as Hakob Arshakyan, the Vice-Speaker of Armenia, to discuss cooperation in technology and renewable energy. Later, on January 13–14, 2025, he represented India at the Third World Summit of Committees of the Future in Santiago, Chile, where he spoke on "Innovative Anticipatory Governance" and India's parliamentary practices.

In the domain of technology policy, Kumar co-founded the Parliamentarians' Forum for Tech Diplomacy, which he launched on April 22, 2025, in New Delhi. The initiative, launched in collaboration with Australian legislators such as Dylan Wight and Mathew Hilakari, aims to facilitate parliamentary oversight of Artificial Intelligence and establish digital governance standards. Additionally, on November 18, 2025, he hosted an International Parliamentary Exchange at the Odisha Legislative Assembly, welcoming a delegation of 40 parliamentarians from 12 countries to promote subnational diplomatic ties and cross-cultural understanding.

== Parliamentary Committees ==
Kumar is currently serving as the Member of the Standing Committee on Communications and Information Technology; Subordinate Legislation; Standing Committee on Science Technology, Environment, Forests and Climate Change; Consultative Committee for the Ministry of External Affairs and Indian Council of World Affairs.

Kumar has previously served on several key parliamentary bodies, holding positions across a wide spectrum of legislative and governance domains. He has served as Chairman of the Committee on Petitions of the Rajya Sabha and as a member of the Standing Committee on Home Affairs, the Committee on Official Language, the Press Council of India, Committee on Rural Development, Committee of Privileges, and Consultative Committee on East Coast Railways.

== Private Members Bills ==
Kumar has introduced several Private Members' Bills in Parliament over some very important issues. Key Bills introduced are:

1. The Silver Economy (Growth and Empowerment) Bill, 2026 - A bill to provide for the promotion, growth and empowerment of the silver economy in the country by recognising senior citizens as active contributors to economic productivity, innovation and social capital; to establish institutional mechanisms for employment, entrepreneurship and mentorship by senior citizens; to promote age-ready infrastructure and age- tech innovation for senior citizens and for matters connected therewith or incidental thereto.
2. The Temple Autonomy, Governance and Cultural Heritage Management Bill, 2026 - A bill to give effect to the constitutional guarantee of religious autonomy under articles 25 and 26 of the Constitution of India by providing a national framework for autonomous, transparent, community-led and professionally governed management of Hindu temples and religious endowments; to ensure protection of India's temple heritage, rituals and traditions; to secure financial integrity and optimal utilisation of temple assets for religious and community welfare purposes; and for matters connected therewith or incidental thereto.
3. The Advanced Medical Response Infrastructure and Training Bill, 2026 - A bill to recognise emergency survival during the Golden Hour as a public health right intrinsically linked to the right to life; to establish a decentralized national emergency survival ecosystem through mandatory public access defibrillation, universal life-support education, digital integration of emergency response assets, legal protection for citizen responders, and coordinated institutional responsibility across public and private sectors; and for matters connected therewith or incidental thereto
4. Machine Created Intellectual Asset Bill, 2025 - A bill to establish a legal framework for the recognition of content, attribution of authorship and protection of intellectual property right in AI-generated works, addressing the interests of creators, developers, users, and the public, with a focus on ensuring access, transparency, fairness, and the ethical use of AI technologies and for matters connected therewith or incidental thereto.
5. The Ecocide (Prevention and Accountability) Bill, 2025 - to provide for the recognition, prevention, and punishment of ecocide, ensure restoration of environmental harm, and promote environmental justice in accordance with constitutional and international environmental principles and for matters connected therewith or incidental thereto.
6. The Classified Information and Espionage Control Bill, 2025 - a bill to establish a comprehensive legal framework for the classification, protection and management of sensitive information relating to national security; to regulate the authorised access, handling and disclosure of such information; to penalise unauthorised access and disclosure, including acts of espionage; to safeguard constitutional rights and ensure transparency; and to repeal the Official Secrets Act, 1923, along with matters connected therewith or incidental thereto.
7. The Sustainable Fashion (Promotion and Regulation) Bill, 2025 – This bill establishes a legal framework to promote environmentally sustainable and socially just practices in India's fashion industry. It proposes creating a Sustainable Fashion Commission to regulate waste, ensure fair labour standards, and advance a circular economy. Key measures include green certification, awareness campaigns, and education, aligning the sector's growth with sustainability, worker welfare, and national development goals.
8. The Viral Hepatitis (Prevention and Control) Bill, 2025 - This bill seeks to prevent and control Viral Hepatitis while safeguarding affected individuals' rights. It prohibits discrimination, ensures informed consent for testing and treatment, and mandates confidentiality. The bill directs government efforts toward antiviral therapy, awareness programs, and workplace safety. It also establishes grievance redressal mechanisms through Viral Hepatitis Complaint Officers and imposes penalties for violations related to discrimination and confidentiality breaches.
9. The Central Educational Institutions (Reservation in Admission) Amendment Bill, 2023 - This bill proposes reservations for women in Central Educational Institutions to address gender disparities in higher education. It seeks to promote equality under Article 14 of the Constitution and enhance women's access to education, thereby enabling greater societal participation.
10. The Antiquities and Art Treasures (Amendment) Bill, 2023 - This bill aims to strengthen the penal provisions under the Antiquities and Art Treasures Act to combat the smuggling of cultural heritage. It highlights the need to address insufficient punitive measures against the illicit export of antiquities and art treasures. The bill seeks to review and revise the penal provisions concerning the export or attempted export of antiquities and art treasures in violation of the Antiquities and Art Treasures Act.
11. The Net Zero Emissions Bill, 2022 - This bill provides a framework for achieving net-zero emissions by 2070 in line with India's commitments under the United Nations Framework Convention on Climate Change. It includes provisions for maintaining a vulnerable population registry to protect communities from severe climate events.
12. The Code of Criminal Procedure (Amendment) Bill, 2022 - This bill seeks to redefine procedural frameworks concerning bail provisions. It addresses the lack of definitions for terms like "Bail" and "Anticipatory Bail" in the current Code of Criminal Procedure and aims to refine the categorization of offences.
13. The Cigarettes and Other Tobacco Products (prohibition of advertisement and regulation of trade and commerce, production, supply and distribution) (Amendment) Bill, 2022 - This bill proposes amendments to the Cigarettes and Other Tobacco Products (Prohibition of Advertisement and Regulation of Trade and Commerce, Production, Supply and Distribution) Act, 2003, including a comprehensive ban on tobacco use in public places and raising the legal age for purchasing tobacco products to 21 years.
14. The Prevention and Prohibition of Witch-branding and Witch-hunting and Other Harmful Practices Bill, 2022 - This bill aims to prevent and prohibit practices such as witch-branding and witch-hunting. It proposes measures for protecting individuals, especially women, from associated violence and discrimination eliminating the torture, oppression, humiliation, killing, sexual assault, stigmatization, discrimination, ostracization while providing provisions for relief and rehabilitation of victims.
15. The Legislation and Expenditure Accountability Bill, 2022 - This bill seeks to enhance accountability and Parliamentary oversight in legislative and policy-making processes. It also aims to improve the quality of expenditure by the Union Government.
16. The Indian Penal Code (Amendment) Bill, 2023 - a bill further to amend the Indian Penal Code, 1860.

== Public Cause ==
=== Drone Centre of Excellence ===
Kumar's approach to the development of his nodal district, Kalahandi, has been noted for its innovative character and has been viewed as a model for similar initiatives. Under the Sansad Adarsh Gram Yojana (SAGY), he established India's first Centres of Excellence for Drone Technology (CoEs) in two government schools located in the villages of Sagada and Bhatangpadar in Kalahandi district. The initiative aims to equip tribal youth, particularly women, with advanced skills in drone technology, thereby promoting technical empowerment and fostering a new generation of "drone didis."

=== Sansad Adarsh Gram Yojana (SAGY) ===
In 2020, Mr Kumar adopted the Gram Panchayats of Sagada and Bhatangpadar in Kalahandi district, Odisha, under the Sansad Adarsh Gram Yojana (SAGY) with the objective of advancing inclusive and participatory rural development. Both GPs, home to a population comprising more than 95% Scheduled Castes and Scheduled Tribes, had long experienced deficits in basic infrastructure, education, healthcare, and livelihood opportunities, and had been significantly affected by Left-Wing Extremism despite their proximity to the district headquarters of Bhawanipatna. Their selection under SAGY was intended to address these structural gaps and demonstrate a replicable model of rural transformation through targeted, convergence-based interventions. Development activities undertaken included road construction, provision of safe drinking water, installation of solar lighting, creation of smart classrooms, construction of girls’ hostels, skill development programmes, and the promotion of environmentally sustainable livelihoods.

During the implementation period, Mr Kumar followed a multi-stakeholder approach involving district and block administrations, community institutions, civil society partners, and local representatives. Progress was regularly monitored through review meetings, field visits, and direct engagement with residents to ensure timely execution of projects and resolution of challenges. Support from successive state administrations and central leadership contributed to the continuity of the initiative. Through these coordinated efforts, SAGY in Sagada and Bhatangpadar aimed to strengthen local governance structures and foster measurable improvements in socio-economic indicators, positioning the two Gram Panchayats as emerging examples of sustainable and community-driven rural development.

=== SDC Cup 2020 ===
As the Advisor to the Special Development Council (SDC) of the Government of Odisha, Sujeet Kumar oversaw the organization of the SDC Cup 2020, a football tournament designed to engage indigenous youth from Odisha. The event featured competitive matches at district and state levels, culminating in a final match at Barabati Stadium, Cuttack, attended by Odisha Chief Minister Naveen Patnaik and Indian football legend Bhaichung Bhutia. Supported by the Football Association of Odisha (FAO) and the All India Football Federation (AIFF), the championship involved over 10,000 participants from nine tribal-dominated districts, with competitions held in both men's and women's categories.

=== Kalahandi Dialogue ===
Kumar initiated the “Kalahandi Dialogue” (http://www.kalahandidialogue.org/) held in September 2018, as a collaborative platform to engage stakeholders including policymakers, global leaders, development practitioners, entrepreneurs, social entrepreneurs, elected representatives, intellectuals, and local citizens in discussions on development. The event, hosted in Kalahandi, aimed to foster dialogue and action on regional development issues and served as an inspiration for similar platforms.

=== Legislative Engagement ===
Kumar was involved in legislative engagement and advocacy through Kalinga Kusum, a non-profit organization, in partnership with UNICEF. This initiative aimed to orient Odisha Legislative Assembly members (MLAs) on areas such as budgeting, child rights, and ease of doing business. Kumar provides mentorship support to Kalinga Kusum and promotes the use of technology to enhance governance and address critical challenges.

=== Child-Friendly Constituency (CFC) ===
Kumar played a role in conceptualizing and implementing the Child-Friendly Constituency (CFC) initiative, developed in collaboration with the Kalinga Kusum Foundation and UNICEF. The initiative focuses on creating constituencies that prioritize child welfare and rights. The first CFC project in India was implemented in the Khandapada Assembly Constituency of Odisha's Nayagarh district, with the support of local MLA Anubhav Patnaik. The project received recognition from UNICEF for its innovative approach to promoting child-friendly policies.

== Awards, Recognition and Honorary positions ==
- Awarded by Shri Amit Shah, Home Minister, Government of India as a 'Special Appreciation' for promoting liver health and raising awareness about liver related diseases.
- Awarded as Outstanding Parliamentarians at the Uday India National Conclave – Developed Odisha 2036.
- Awarded as the Second Sarat Kar Memorial Award for Best Young Parliamentarian.
- Odisha Youth Inspiration Award 2017, Odisha Diary Foundation
- Mason Scholar and Hauser Fellow, Harvard Kennedy School, 2010–11
- Asia Pacific Leadership Fellow (APLP) at East West Centre, Hawaii, 2009–10.
- Chair of Young Indians (Yi), Bhubaneswar Chapter 2012-13
- Global Leadership Fellow, One of twenty fellows selected by the World Economic Forum (WEF), Switzerland from about 3000 odd applicants, 2006
- Adjunct Faculty, Sri Sri University (SSU) & Advisor, SSU Global Centre for Indigenous Study
