= Madhab Chandra Dash =

Indian ecologist and environmental biologist

- Born: 28 November 1939 (age 86); Malati Patpur, Puri, Odisha
- Education: Ravenshaw College, Utkal University, University of Calgary
- Known for: Vermitechnology, Environmental Biology, Soil Biology, Environmental Impact Assessment
- Scientific career
- Fields: Ecology, Conservation Biology, Environmental Pollution
- Doctoral advisor: J. B. Cragg

Madhab Chandra Dash (born 1939 in Puri, Odisha) is an Indian ecologist and environmental biologist. He is currently a member of the Appellate Authority, Water (PCP) Act, 1974 Government of Orissa. He is a former vice chancellor of Sambalpur University (2001–2004). He is a past chairman of the Orissa State Pollution Control Board (1997–2001) and a former member of the Central Pollution Control Board, New Delhi.

Dash taught ecology at the School of Life Sciences, in Sambalpur University from 1973 until 1997 and was instrumental in expansion of the department as well as making it one of the early academic departments in India to focus on a broader life science curricula. He became a full professor in 1975 and was the head of the department from 1974 until 1987.

== Educational background ==
Madhab Chandra Dash was born in 1939 in Puri, Orissa in a Brahmin family. He completed an undergraduate degree in Zoology (Honours) from Ravenshaw College in Cuttack and later completed a masters in Zoology at Utkal University. Dash received his doctoral (PhD) degree in 1970 from the University of Calgary under the guidance of J. B. Cragg. His thesis was titled "Ecology of enchytraeidae (Oligochaeta) in Rocky Mountain forest soils (Kananaskis region, Alberta, Canada)".

After completing his PhD, he returned to India and help grow biological sciences in the State of Orissa and joined the School of Life Sciences at Sambalpur University.

== Contributions ==
Dash has done pioneering work in vermitechnology, soil ecology, conservation of sea turtles, population biology, quantitative ecology, energetics of soil oligochaetes, larval energetics of amphibia, environmental impact assessment (EIA), sustainable development, environmental pollution and its mitigation. He has been instrumental in providing guidance to 41 doctoral students and numerous masters students.

His work on vermitechnology was one of the earliest in India during the late 1970s and he produced one of the early studies on turtle migration and breeding on the coast of Orissa (Gahirmatha). He co-authored one of the earliest book on turtle migrations and population studies to the east coast of India, Gahirmatha in Orissa in 1990. He has conducted work on environmental pollution especially in relation to iron-ore industries, steel and aluminium industries.

Dash was a former Member, National Expert Committee for EIA & EMP of Mining Projects (1995–1997 – 3 years), of the Ministry of Environment & Forests, Government of India, New Delhi.

From 2002 until 2005, he was the Chairman of the National Steering Committee (which consisted of ten high level expert members) for Tropical Soil Biology and Fertility programmes sponsored by TSBF, Nairobi, UNEP, MoEF, (Govt. of India), Jawaharlal Nehru University, New Delhi on "Conservation and Sustainable Management for Below Ground Bio-diversity" operating at multiple centers and also contributed to the second phase of the programme from 2007 until 2009.

Dash was the Chairman, Expert Committee (that consisted of 11 members) for Environmental clearance to the Thermal Power Plants set up by Ministry of Environment and Forests (MoEF notification No. S.O.-319(E)) from April, 1997 to 2008 by Government of Orissa, Bhubaneswar.

He was the Chairman of the visiting team of National Assessment and Accreditation Council (UGC), Bangalore to Colleges and Universities – from 2002 to 2007. He has led over 15 major research projects in Ecology and Environmental Sciences, EIA & EMP etc. sponsored by variety of national and international institutions such as Smithsonian, USA, World Bank, UGC & CSIR, New Delhi, MoEF, New Delhi, Govt. of Orissa.

Dash has been an expert advisor to the "House Committee on Environment" of Orissa Legislative Assembly, Government of Orissa since 2005. Prof. Dash has also consulted widely by the industry especially on environment matters (EIA, EMP, Environmental Law).

Dash has published more than 200 peer reviewed scientific papers and authored more than 17 books and numerous book chapters for leading publishers across the world such as Cambridge University Press UK, Academic Press USA, Macmillan India and Tata McGraw Hill, India.

== Awards and recognition ==
Dash was awarded by the State Government of the Orissa in 1991 its highest scientific honour (Samanta Chandrasekhar Award) for his seminal contributions of life sciences research.

He is a fellow of Fellow, National Academy of Science (Allahabad), India and a Fellow, National Institute of Ecology (New Delhi), India.

Two species of Indian earthworms have been named after him for his contribution to the field of vermitechnology.

== Selected Books and Book Chapters ==
Dash, M.C. 1979. Consumers in "Grassland Ecosystems of the World" (Ed. T.T. Coupland), Cambridge University Press, U.K. 609.653 p.

Dash, M.C. (co-author), 1980. Decomposer Subsystems. In "Grassland Systems Analysis and Man". (Eds. Breymeyer and van Dyne). Cambridge University Press, U.K. 609–653 p.

Dash, M.C. 1987. The Other Annelids (other than Polychaetes). In "Animal Energetics Vol. I" (Eds. Pandian and Vernberg). Academic Press, USA. 261–299.

Dash, M.C. 1993. Fundamentals of Ecology. Tata- McGraw Hill, New Delhi (1999, 5th Reprint), 2nd revised edition 2001, 10th reprint, 2008, 525 p., 3rd revised edition, 2009 (in Press)

Dash, M.C. 2000. Role of Enchytraeids in Tropical Agro eco-systems. "In management of Tropical Agro eco-systems and the beneficial of soil Biota". Oxford & IBH Publication (P) Ltd.

Dash, M.C. 2004. Ecology, Chemistry and Management of Environmental Pollution. Macmillan India Ltd., New Delhi. 322 p.

Dash M. C. (2012). Charles Darwin's Plough: Tools for Vermitechnology. IK International Publishers. ISBN 9381141274 ISBN 978-9381141274.
