= Burla, India =

Burla
- Locality
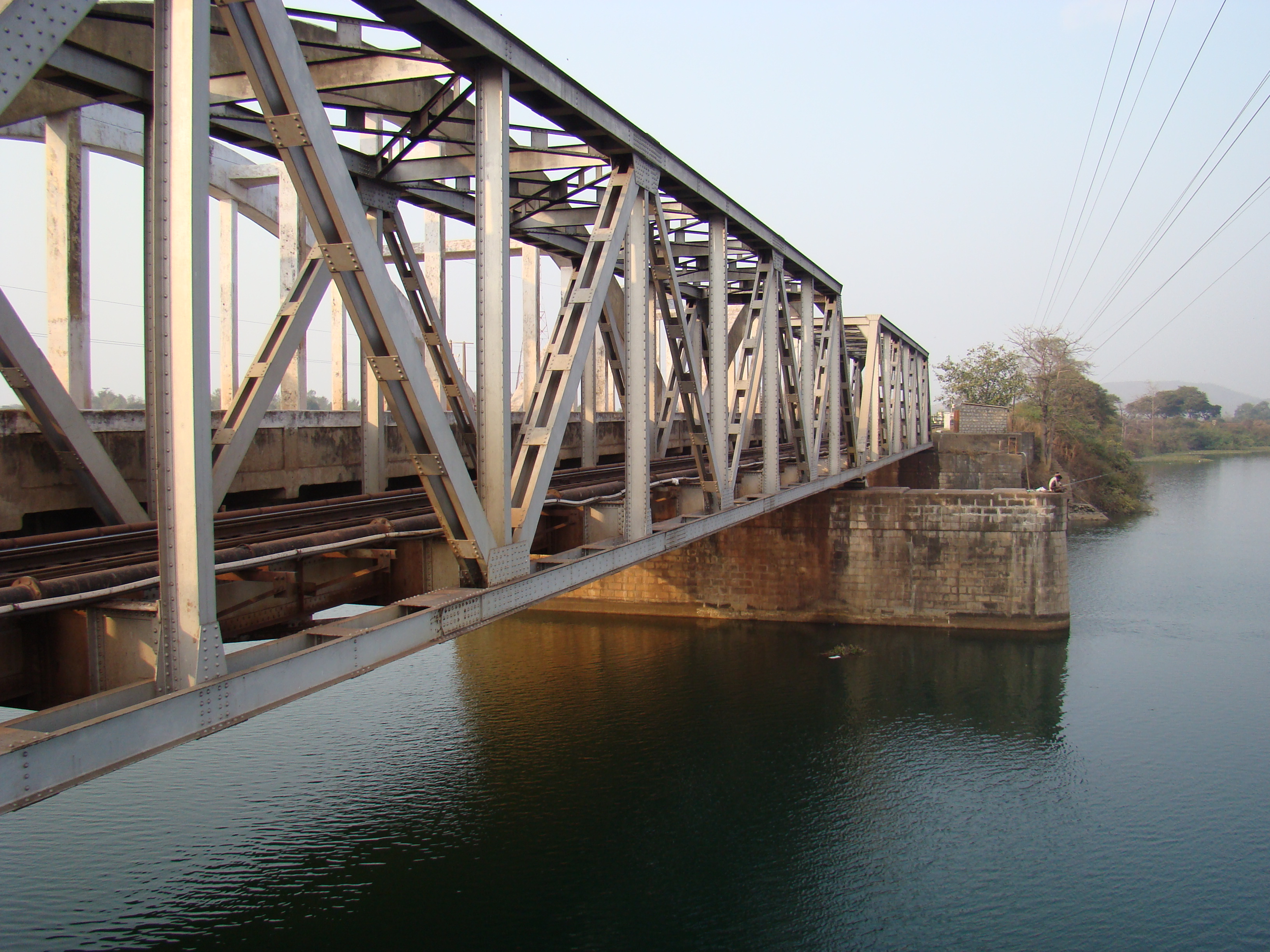
- Power Channel at Burla

- Location in Odisha, India Burla (India)
- Coordinates: 21.5°N 83.87°E
- Country: India
- State: Odisha
- District: Sambalpur
- Elevation: 173 m (568 ft)

Population (2001)
  - Total: 39,188

Languages
  - Official: Odia
- Time zone: UTC+5:30 (IST)
- Vehicle registration: OD-15
- Website: odisha.gov.in

Burla is a town in Sambalpur city in the state of Odisha, India. It earlier had a Notified Area Council (NAC) until 2014 after which it was included in Sambalpur city under Sambalpur Municipal Corporation (SMC). It was earlier a small town on the banks of the Mahanadi. One can reach this place by road with National Highway 6 which is one of the busiest trunk routes in India as it connects Hazira to Kolkata. Hirakud Railway Station is at one end of the town and a walking distance from the Mahanadi Coal Limited (MCL).

== Geography ==
Burla is located at 21.5°N 83.87°E. It has an average elevation of 173 metres (567 feet). The locality lies at one end of Hirakud Dam which is located around 2 km west of the town. The Jawahar Minar overlooks the Hirakud Dam, the lake and the surrounding forests of Barapahad (Twelve Hills). At the other side of the dam is the township of Hirakud.

== Overview ==
Burla is situated in a half an hour distance from Central area of Sambalpur and one hour distance from Bargarh, which are connected by National Highway 6. Burla houses three leading institutions of Odisha: Sambalpur University and the Institute of Information Technology (SUIIT), Veer Surendra Sai Medical College and Veer Surendra Sai University of Technology (VSSUT) (formerly called University College of Engineering-UCE). The town is horse-shoe shaped with an artificial lake in the middle and NH6 traversing through one end.

The town centre is small and is divided into 'Kaccha Market' and 'Pukka Market' and hosts numerous small stores and stalls, which are mostly family-based small business enterprises, However after demolition drive of 2023 most of the shops in market was destroyed.

'Sambalpuri' is a dialect of the Odia language, and this Sambalpuri dialect is traditionally spoken in the town of Burla, however people here are also fluent in proper Odia and Hindi.

== Demographics ==
As of 2001 India census, Burla had a population of 39,188. Males constitute 52% of the population and females 48%. Burla has an average literacy rate of 74%, higher than the national average of 59.5%; with male literacy of 81% and female literacy of 66%. 11% of the population is under 6 years of age.

== Economy ==
The area's economy is driven by education, medicine, civil engineering, and electrical engineering. Veer Surendra Sai Medical College is the largest hospital in Western Odisha. Veer Surendra Sai University of Technology is the oldest engineering college in Odisha. Sambalpur University is one of the three oldest Universities in Odisha, the other two beings Utkal University and Berhampur University. All these institutes of higher learning make Burla a top-tier destination for thousands of students every academic year.

The Hirakud Dam, which is the longest earthen dam in the world, caters to the hydro-electric power generation needs of the State. Numerous civil and electrical engineers reside in Burla. The headquarters of the Mahanadi Coal Fields Ltd. (a subsidiary of Coal India Limited) area located in Burla. A IIM called Indian Institute Of Management-Sambalpur has come up in this township.

== Education ==
Burla is a university town which is home to the Sambalpur University, the Veer Surendra Sai Institute of Medical Sciences and Research and the Veer Surendra Sai University of Technology, Burla, besides numerous schools and colleges, thus the student population at the height of academic year is sizable. All three centres for higher learning have their own auditorium which are well equipped.

Sambalpur University is one of the older universities in the State and has numerous colleges under its jurisdiction. The 'University' as it is popularly known in the region has a large campus within the rolling hills and is a community in itself. The university is popularly known as Jyoti Vihar the main tag line of the university is "SA Vidya Ja Vimuktaye" meaning "That is education which liberates".

In 2010 opened an institute of information technology as an autonomous constituent of Sambalpur University, named Sambalpur University Institute of Information Technology. The Government of Odisha funded 10 crores for the academic building while the Western Odisha Development Council funded the institute with a sum of 50 lakh rupees. It is designed in line with the institutes of information technology, offering two B.Tech degree courses in electronics and communications engineering and computer science engineering; three M.Sc degree courses in computer sciences, bioinformatics and electronics, MCA and two M.Tech degree courses in embedded systems and computer science. Presently functioning in the CCNA building of Sambalpur University, It has three fully-equipped computer science labs and one electronics and physics lab. The students were scheduled to move to a new academic building by August 2013. It is the brainchild of former Vice-Chancellor of Sambalpur University, Sri Arun K Pujari.

VSS Medical College is one of the premier medical colleges of the state and is centrally located in the town. It houses the ICMR Malaria Research Centre. Govt. of Odisha has principally decided to give this college an autonomous status naming Veer Surendra Sai Institute of Medical Science and Research (VIMSAR).

University College of Engineering (UCE) is one of the oldest engineering colleges in India. It celebrated its golden jubilee in 2006. A bill was passed in the State Assembly to make it a State Unitary University and it has been renamed as Veer Surendra Sai University of Technology. This college has been a vast source for intellectual capital in the engineering sector, both public and private.

Higher Secondary (10+2) education is imparted by the Burla NAC College, the University Higher Secondary College and the DAV Public School.

The town has numerous schools. The Burla Boys High School, the Burla Girls High School, the DAV, the Sathya Sai School, the University High School, Sri Aurobindo School, Saraswati Shisu Vidya Mandir, The Saint Lukes school, The Xavier's school, and the Officer's Colony upper primary (UP) and middle schools are prominent.

Various inter-institutional activities are organized among the educational institutions that enhance the academic experience of members of the institutions in Burla. Burla has a thriving sports culture with several local cricket, football and badminton teams including those from the University, Medical College and the Engineering University. Annual sports tournaments are a regular feature of the community.

== Culture ==
The locality organises several festivals through the year most notably the Rath Yatra, the Durga Puja, the Viswakarma Puja, Ravan Poda, Ganesh Puja & Saraswati Puja and Shivaratri. Durga Puja is the time when the whole town wears a festive look with three main celebration-centres (pandals as they are locally referred to as) organised by three different puja-committees. Diwali is also celebrated with its usual fanfare and holi is a major festival as well. One of the distinct celebrations takes place during Shivaratri which is celebrated on a mountain-top Shiva temple. This mountain-top Shiva temple is deserted throughout the year except for the two days of celebration during Shivaratri. The three higher educational institutions viz. the Sambalpur University, the VSS medical college and the Veer Surendra Sai University of Technology also organise student fairs and annual celebrations.

During Durga Puja festival Ravanpoda (Burning of the demon Ravan described in Ramayan in Tretaya Yuga) is organised by the people of different sect and religion mainly by Sikhs in the city for the last 55 years. The poda is organised under the hill of Chandli Dungri in a big playground.

Nuakhai is a major festival of people which is celebrated after offering new rice to Goddess Samaleswari. During the festival, all the family members stay together and celebrate the festival by taking the blessings of elders. To promote art and culture, a festival named 'NUAKHAI BHETGHAT' is celebrated every year and has been continuously organized for 28 years. 'BURLA UTSAV' is celebrated with every 3–4 years. Cultural troupes from different parts of India take part in this Utsav. In 2013, "Aamar Utsav" celebrated a Cultural Dance Programme of Western Odisha in the Bharati Club field in the month of December. "Aamar Utsav" represent religious, cultural dance, music, tribal martial dance connected with western Odisha's people's traditions.

== Nature ==
Burla is situated on the banks of the river Mahanadi and is surrounded by mountains and verdant forests. The large lake created by the Hirakud Dam attracts various bird species in the winter months and the surrounding forests also have wildlife such as hyenas, elephants, leopards and deer. In summer, temperatures reach 50 degrees Celsius and in winter they can go as low as 5 degrees Celsius. The jungles, river bed and dam itself attract thousands of tourists to the town every year. During winter, many of the Siberian birds come to the lake created by the Hirakud Dam.

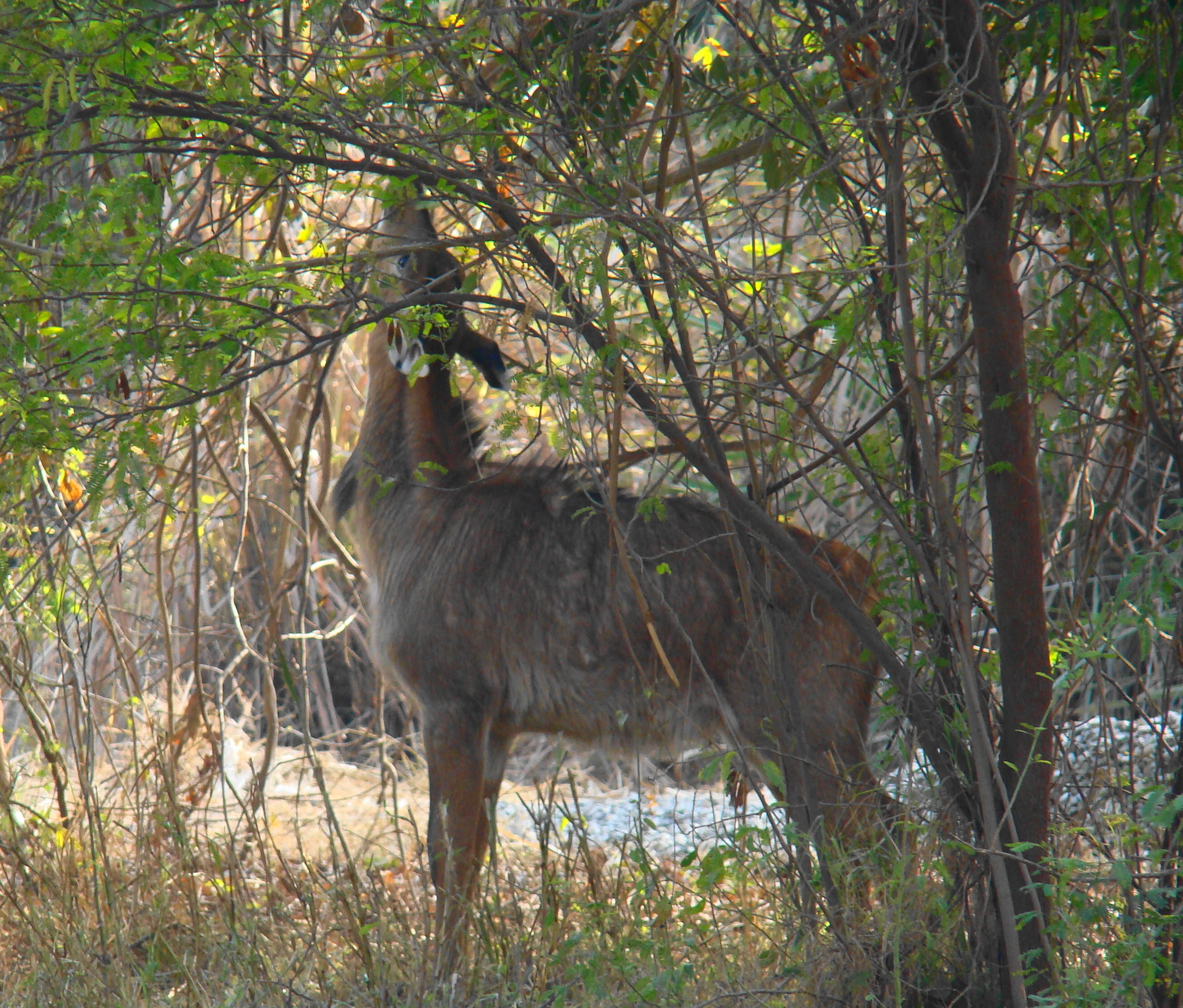
Nilgai browsing in the nearby jungle

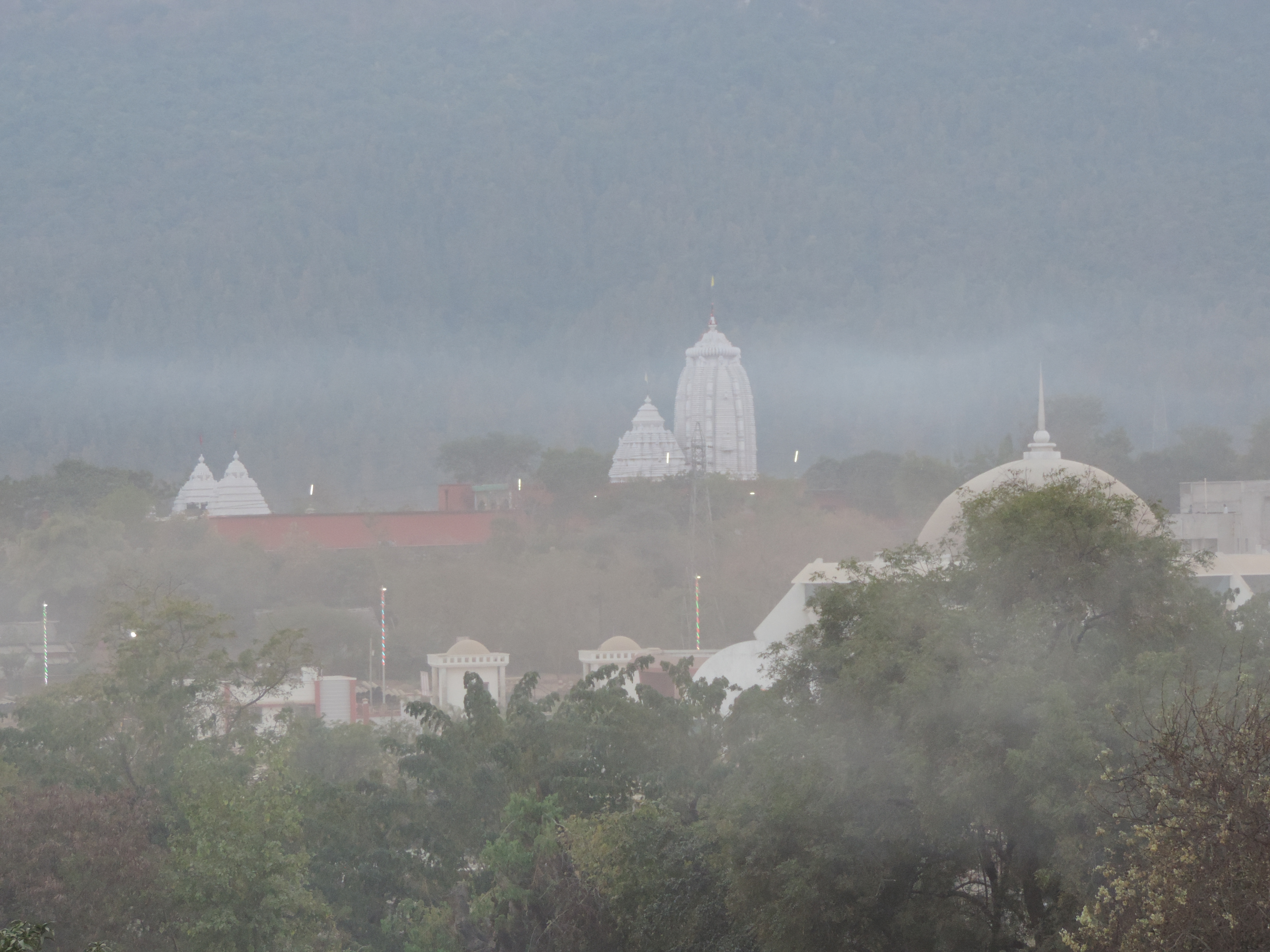
The Jagannath temple on the top of the mountain

== Places of interest ==
Hirakud Dam is about 2 km from the main town. It is the world's longest earthen dam. The reservoir is Odisha's largest water resource for the purposes of irrigation. The attached hydro-electric power generation units are Odisha's largest source of electric power. A canal having its origin from Hirakud dam goes to Chipilima for electricity production. The dam is open to visitors. Only official vehicles are allowed to drive on the dam. During the monsoon, the dam opens its floodgates and one can witness the power of water. The Right Dyke stretches for more than 11 km along Mahanadi. Forests stretch all along the dyke and during the winter months, they provide good locations for picnics and nature lovers.

Jawahar Minar, named after India's first prime minister Jawaharlal Nehru, stands near the dam's main site. The Minar has a plaque in memory to all the workers who lost their lives during its construction. Jawahar Minar provides scenic views of the dam, the forests and the huge lake. Sunrise and sunsets are a treat to the eyes from the Minar.

The Ghanteswari Temple is another place of attraction which finds its place on the bank of Mahanadi at Chipilima.
