= Parshuram Mishra =

Botanist, educationist

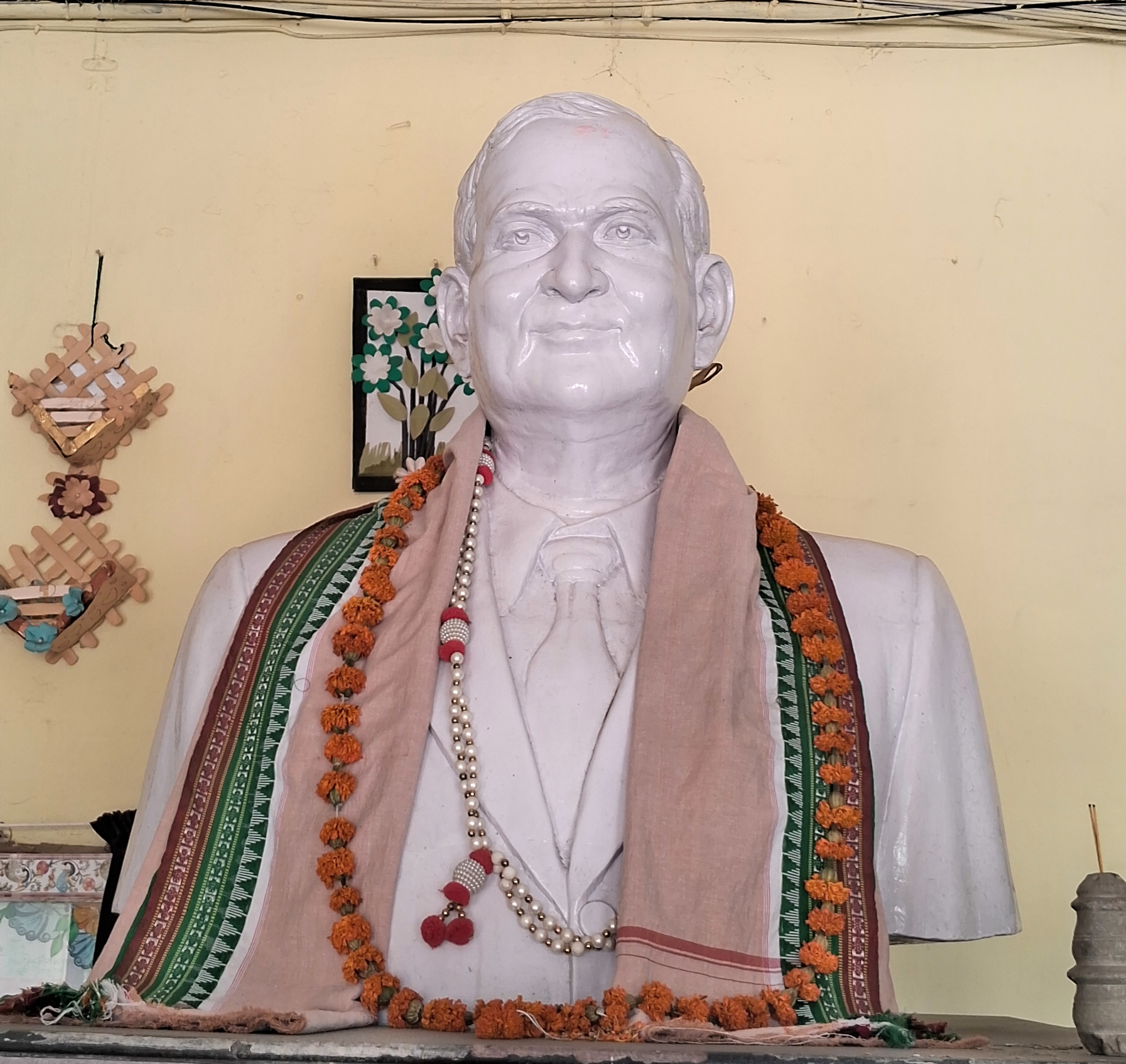
- Statue of Parshuram Mishra at PMIASE,Sambalpur
- Born: 25 January 1894; Sambalpur district
- Died: 4 August 1981 (aged 87)
- Occupation: Botanist, poet
- Parent(s): Loknath Mishra; Kunti Devi
- Awards: Padma Shri in literature and education; Odisha Sahitya Akademi Ovation (1972)

Parshuram Mishra (25 January 1894 – 4 August 1981) was an Indian botanist, educationist and the first vice chancellor of the Sambalpur University. He completed his college studies at the University of Calcutta in 1961 and secured a doctoral degree (PhD) from the University of Leeds, the first person from Odisha to secure a doctoral degree from the university. He was a former member of faculty at Leeds during which period he published several botanical articles. Returning to India, he became the vice chancellor of Utkal University. When the Government of Odisha started Sambalpur University in 1967, Mishra was made the first vice chancellor.

The Government of India honoured him in 1960, with the award of Padma Shri, the fourth highest Indian civilian award for his services to the nation. Dr. P. M. Institute of Advanced Study in Education, an institution started in 1988 for advanced studies in education is named after him.

== Early life ==
Parshuram Mishra was born on 25 January 1894 in the village of Tulundi, located near Barapali in Sambalpur district of present-day Odisha. He was born to Loknath Mishra and Kunti Devi. His father worked initially as a Patawari and later became a Revenue Inspector. From an early age, Mishra developed a strong attachment to nature. His childhood experience in village shaped his interest in field of Botany.

== Education ==
Mishra received his primary and lower secondary education in local rural schools. Due to limited educational facilities in the district, he later joined the only high school in Sambalpur after his father was transferred there. He passed the matriculation examination in 1913 and was awarded a district scholarship.

He pursued his Intermediate Science (I.Sc.) studies at Ravenshaw College, Cuttack (Now, Ravenshaw University), under the University of Calcutta, completing it in 1915. For higher studies, he moved to Presidency College, Calcutta, where he studied Chemistry, Botany, and Human Physiology, graduating with a B.Sc. degree in 1917. He completed his M.Sc. in Botany in 1920.

Later, Mishra pursued advanced research in plant anatomy and joined the University of Leeds in England as a research scholar in 1938 under Prof. J. H. Priestley. He was awarded the Doctor of Philosophy (Ph.D.) degree in 1940 for his research contributions.

== Personal life ==
Mishra married during his high school years, which was a common social practice at the time. Despite early responsibilities, he continued to excel academically. He was known to be a reserved and shy individual in his youth, particularly after moving from a rural environment to urban academic settings like Calcutta. Over time, he developed a broader outlook through interaction with peers and exposure to intellectual circles.

He was deeply influenced by his school teacher, Fakir Mishra Kavyatirtha, whom he regarded as an ideal mentor. This influence contributed to his interest in teaching and educational service. In addition to his scientific pursuits, Mishra had a literary inclination and composed poetry reflecting his sensitivity towards nature and life.

== Career and Achievements ==
Mishra began his academic career as an officiating professor of Botany at Ravenshaw College in 1920. He later served as a lecturer and conducted significant research under the guidance of Dr. Parija.

In 1948, he was appointed Principal of Gangadhar Meher College, Sambalpur (Now, the college is upgraded to G.M University), and retired from government service in 1950. He subsequently served as Vice-Chancellor of Utkal University from 1952 to 1955, where his tenure was formally appreciated by the university senate.

In 1967, he became the first Vice-Chancellor of Sambalpur University, playing a key role in its establishment and early development. His administrative leadership helped in framing the statutes, rules, and academic structure of the institution.

== Awards and Honours ==
Dr. Parshuram Mishra was awarded the Padma Shri by the Government of India in 1961 in recognition of his contributions to education and science. Sambalpur University conferred upon him the honorary Doctor of Science (D.Sc.) degree in 1972. He was also recognized in the field of literature; his poetry collection “Bibartan” received an award from the Odisha Sahitya Akademi in 1972. Dr. P. M. Institute of Advanced Study in Education, a teacher training institution started in 1988 for advanced studies in education was named after him.

== Gallery ==
Statue and Institute made and named after Dr. Parshuram Mishra
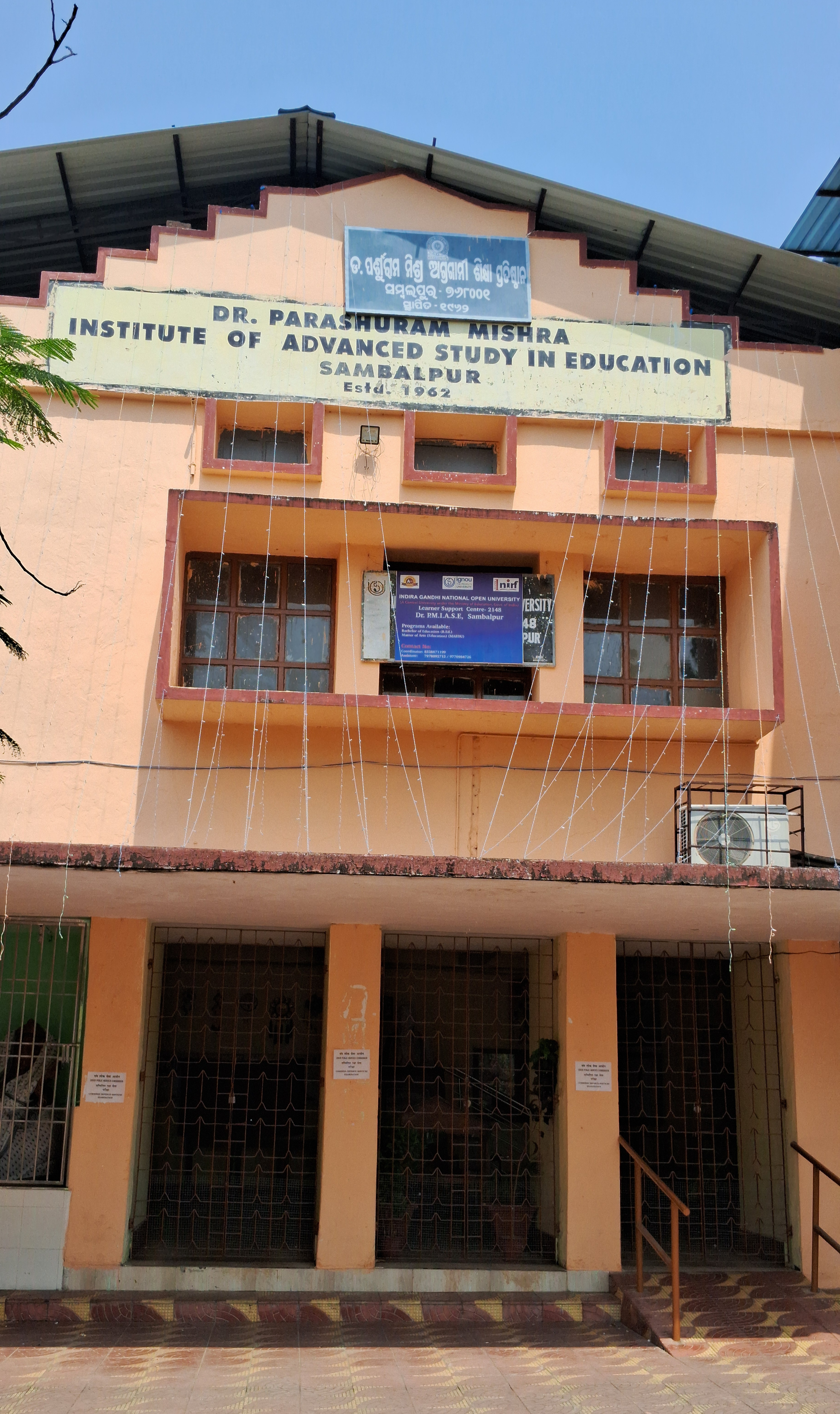
This Teacher Training college Dr. P.M IASE is named after Parshuram Mishra

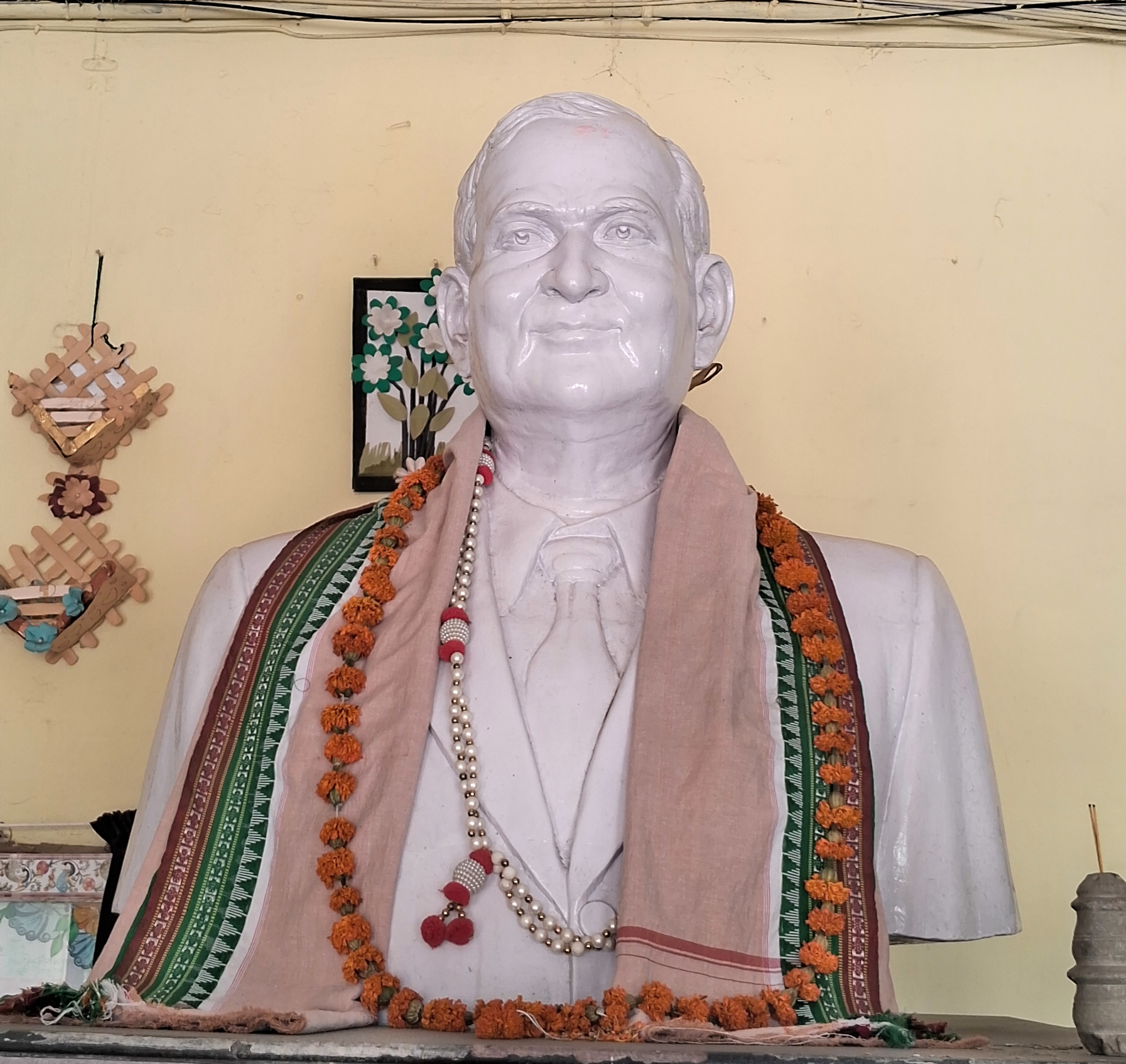
Statue of Parshuram Mishra at PMIASE,Sambalpur

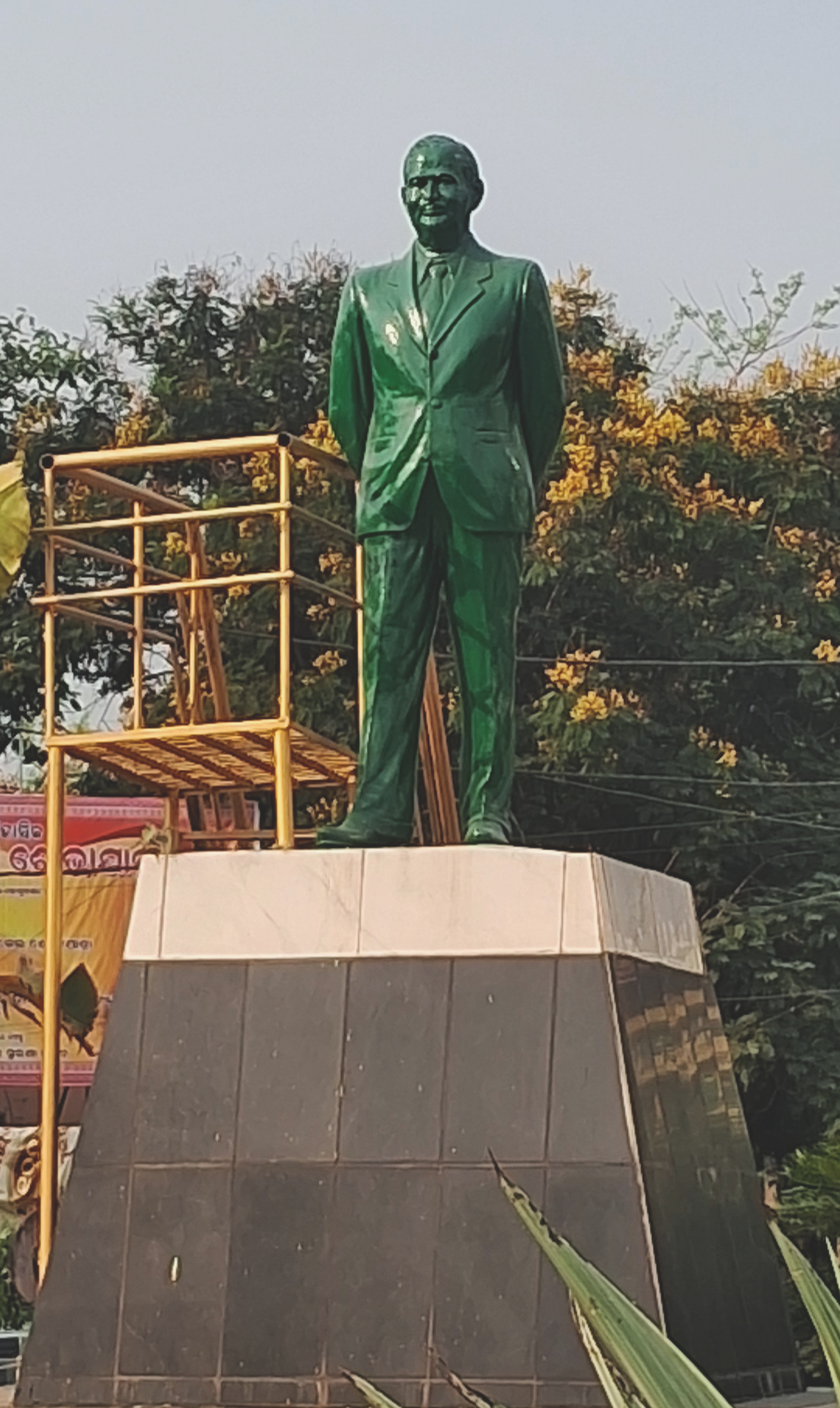
Statue of Parshuram Mishra at Bhutapada Chowk

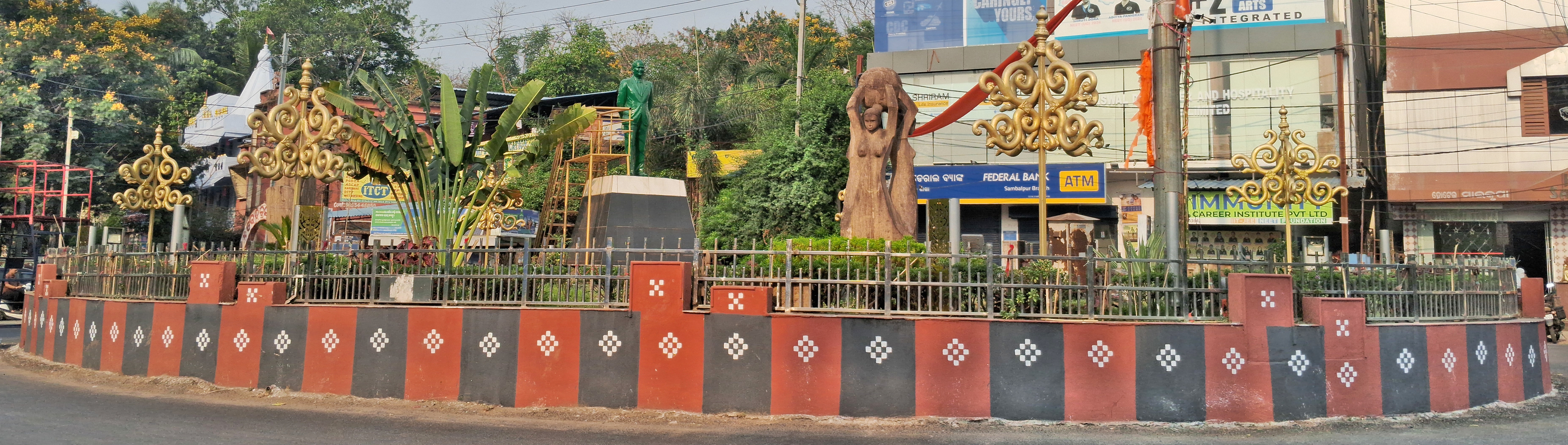
Statue of Parshuram Mishra at Bhutapada Chowk, Sambalpur

== Death ==
Dr. Parshuram Mishra passed away in 1982 at the age of 88.
