= Prem Ram Dubey =

Indian lawyer and politician

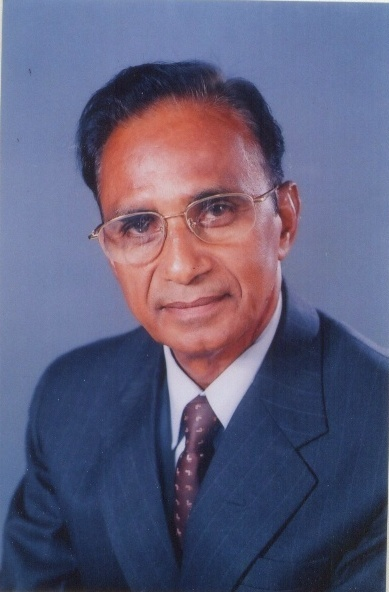
- Born: 22 October 1933
- Died: 17 September 2012 (aged 78)

Prem Ram Dubey (22 October 1933 – 17 September 2012) was an Indian lawyer and politician. He was the founding father of the Kosal State Movement, which campaigns for statehood for Western Odisha.

== Early life and education ==
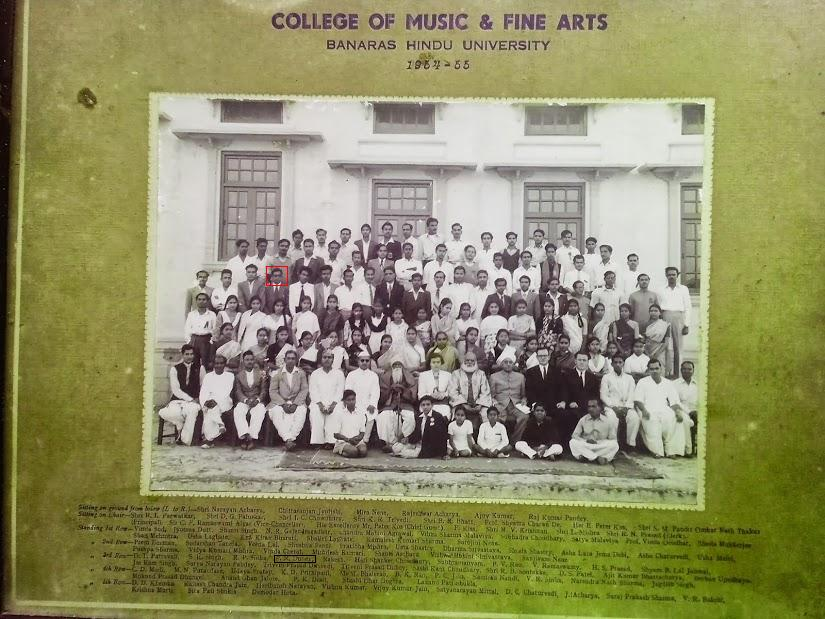
Prem Ram Dubey in BHU

Prem Ram Dubey was the eldest of four sons of Malik Ram Dubey, the Gauntia (chief village headman) family of Anterdol Dandpat, one of many villages submerged in the construction of the Hirakud Dam. He was educated at Guhalpada for his first three years at Anterdol, then subsequently at Balanda village until the age of seven. Thereafter, he was sent to Sambalpur to join Class IV at Zilla School, where he continued his education until Matriculation.

He continued to East Hostel, Ravenshaw College, for his B.A, Hons, before being admitted to Banaras Hindu University, Banaras, where he simultaneously pursued Masters in Law, Philosophy, Music, and Fine Arts. He secured the First position in Masters in Law and won the Benaras Hindu University's Gold Medal. However, he was unable to collect the Medal as he was called home due to the evacuation orders issued ahead of the construction of the Hirakud Dam. These events surrounding the planning and construction of the dam and the removal of the residents of the area from their land had a profound influence on Dubey and his thinking.

In 1955, he married Shashikala, the daughter of Indian independence activist Jwala Prasad Mishra and Smt Vedvati Mishra.

== Career ==
Initially, Dubey was forced by his father to follow the family occupation of cultivating paddy, but was soon drawn away to follow his career in law and politics. In 1967, he joined Sambalpur Law College as a part-time lecturer. He resigned due to internal politics, but returned shortly after having been elected as the Senior Senate Member and Syndicate of Sambalpur University. After a short tenure in this position, he became the Dean of Law at Sambalpur University. He also accepted the position of Principal of Sambalpur Law College. Dubey then joined the Congress Party, following in the path of his uncle Bodhram Dubey, then regional President of Congress. With his uncle, he attended the Simla National Summit of Congress, where he met future Prime Minister Chandra Shekhar. However, he gradually became disillusioned with the Congress Party and concluded that they were unwilling to help the people of Kosal. In 1988, he established his own political party, the Western Orissa Peoples' Front, which became known as the Kosal Party in 1992.

Dubey thereby became the founding father of the Kosal state movement and submitted a memorandum to the President of India. Local parties from Jharkhand claimed inclusion of Sambalpur and Sundergarh District into Jharkhand. Dubey formed the Kosal Sammelani, which urged the state and union governments not to enter into any negotiation with any claimants for the transfer of any part of the proposed Kosal state. Dubey argued that while Punjab has only 46,000 km^{2}, western Odisha, with 75,000 sq. km and a population of one crore, had not been granted statehood.

He also published the first newspaper for the region, Kosal Khabar, and constituted the "Kosal Sena". He wrote the books Hame Kosli Hamar Bhasa Kosli and "Why Kosal State". In 'Kosal Khabar' he expanded on his ideas to establish a separate state to end discrimination by coastal people against the peoples of the Odishan interior, and spearheaded most of the protest programmes.

== Other activities ==
Outside of politics, Dubey worked as a lawyer in Sambalpur, and also wrote articles about history and language. His historical research is mentioned in several historical books, including Dakshin Kosal Ka Prachin Itihas by Dr. P.L. Diwan. One article, "The politics of Language", asserts that the Oriya language was established as the spoken language of Sambalpur and Kalahandi districts by the British Government, which led Sambalpuri-speaking regions to be claimed as Oriya speaking regions, and later to be denied statehood.

== Death ==
Prem Ram Dubey died on 17 September 2012 after a prolonged illness. Courts in Sambalpur were suspended for a day in his honour.
