= Sujata Kujur =

Indian field hockey player (born 2003)

Sujata Kujur (25 January 2003) is an Indian hockey player from Odisha. She plays for the India women's national field hockey team as a midfielder. She plays for Odisha in the domestic tournaments.

== Early life ==
Kujur is from Sundergarh district, Odisha. Her father's name is Dina Kujur. She did her graduation at a college affiliated with Sambalpur University and also played for SU. She started playing hockey at the age of 10. She is youngest of three children in her family.

== Career ==
=== International ===
She made her Junior India debut in August 2023, in the 2023 Four Nations Junior Women's Invitational Tournament at Düsseldorf. In June 2023, she was part of the Indian team that won the Junior Asia Cup at Kakamigahara, Japan. In December 2023, she representing India in the 2023 10th FIH Junior World Cup for women at Santiago, Chile.

Kujur made her senior India debut at Perth in Australia, in May 2025. She was part of the Indian team that played five matches, including three tests against the senior Australian women's team.

Later, she trained as part of the 40 probables at the Senior India camp at SAI, Bangalore and was selected to play the FIH Pro League 2024-25 European leg, which was played from June 14 to 29 at London, Antwerp, and Berlin.

=== Domestic ===
Kujur was the skipper of the Sambalpur University team that won the 4th Khelo India University Games at Guwahati in February 2024.
