= Sambalpur University Institute of Information Technology =

Academic institution In India

Sambalpur University Institute Of Information Technology
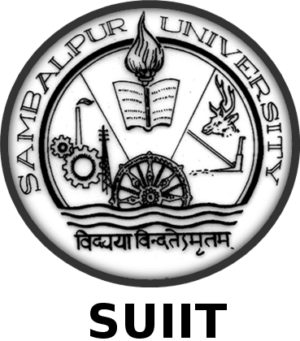
- An autonomous constituent institute of Sambalpur University in the line of IIITs
- Motto: Leveraging Technology, Inspiring Innovation, Flourishing Mankind
- Type: Public
- Established: 2010
- Affiliations: UGC
- Director: Dr. Sudarson Jena
- Location: Sambalpur, Odisha, India; 21.4853833°N 83.8832933°E
- Campus: Jyotivihar, Sambalpur
- Acronym: SUIIT
- Website: www.suiit.ac.in

Sambalpur University Institute of Information Technology (SUIIT) was established in 2010.

== History ==
SUIIT was set up in 2010 as a government institute of Sambalpur University and is the first technical institute which was to be set up in a general university after 2002 in Odisha. SUIIT is the brainchild of former vice-chancellor Prof Arun Pujari. Most of the courses being offered by the SUIIT were pulled out from different existing departments of Sambalpur University. Electronics was taken out of physics department, computer science from mathematics while bioinformatics was pulled out from life sciences department. Only the undergraduate courses newly add in SUIIT. While the state government had given an initial budget of Rs 10 crore in 2009-10 for the institute, Rs 5 crore from Directorate of Distance and Continuing Education (DDCE) was given to it for construction of its buildings inside the varsity.

== Location ==
The present campus of the university is located at Burla, 2 km away from NH 6. The campus of this university is in the vicinity of Mahanadi Coal Fields Limited, VSSUT and located on the foothills of the Hirakud Dam.

== Admission ==
From the year 2017, admissions into the B.Tech. courses will be through OJEE Counselling. Candidates both regular and lateral entry can take admission only through OJEE 2017 Counselling by following appropriate admission procedure. For detail eligibility criteria and admission/counselling procedure, the candidate may refer OJEE website. There is no other way to take admission into B.Tech. programmes. Refund and reservation policy are as per rules.

== Academics ==
- Computer Science and Engineering (CSE)
- Computer Science and Engineering with Specialization in Artificial intelligence (AI) and Machine Learning(ML)
- Computer Science and Engineering with Specialization In Information and Cyber Security (ICS)
- Electrical and Electronics Engineering (EEE)
- Electronics and Communication Engineering (ECE)

== Hostels ==
New hostels were inaugurated and started functioning from 1 August 2016 and another new hostel in 2017.

== See also ==
- List of institutions of higher education in Odisha
- IIT Bhubaneswar
- NIT Rourkela
- IIIT Bhubaneswar
- Veer Surendra Sai University of Technology
