= Antarduli =

Antarduli (alt. Anterdole) was a village in India, located in Sambalpur district in the state of Odisha, which is located on the eastern side of the country. It was one of least 249 villages partially or completely submerged by the construction of Hirakud Dam reservoir which was completed in 1957.

Anterdol was a relatively big, prosperous and ancient village. Unlike most of the common villages it had been declared a Dandapat.
