= Vermitechnology =

Vermitechnology is an overarching term for the following subtopics:

- Vermifiltration: A process for purifying effluent that utilises earthworms (also called vermidigestion)
- Vermicomposting: Utilising earthworms for composting organic material
- Vermiculture: the commercial rearing of earthworms to be used for other processes e.g. fishing

Vermitechnology includes the study and commercial application of technologies that utilise earthworms for degrading waste organic materials for sanitation and agricultural re-use. Organic wastes degraded and stabilised by earthworms include those suspended or dissolved in water and also solid organic material.
