= Odisha Teacher Eligibility Test =

Entrance exam in Odisha

Odisha Teacher Eligibility Test (OTET) is the complete state government controlled entrance type test for recruitment of teachers in various government schools in Odisha. It is conducted by BSE, Odisha. Board of Secondary Education (BSE), Odisha conducts Odisha Teacher Eligibility Test (OTET) in order to select candidates for the appointment of teacher for Classes I to VIII in government, private aided, and private unaided schools of Odisha.
