= Sambalpur University =

Public research university in Odisha, India

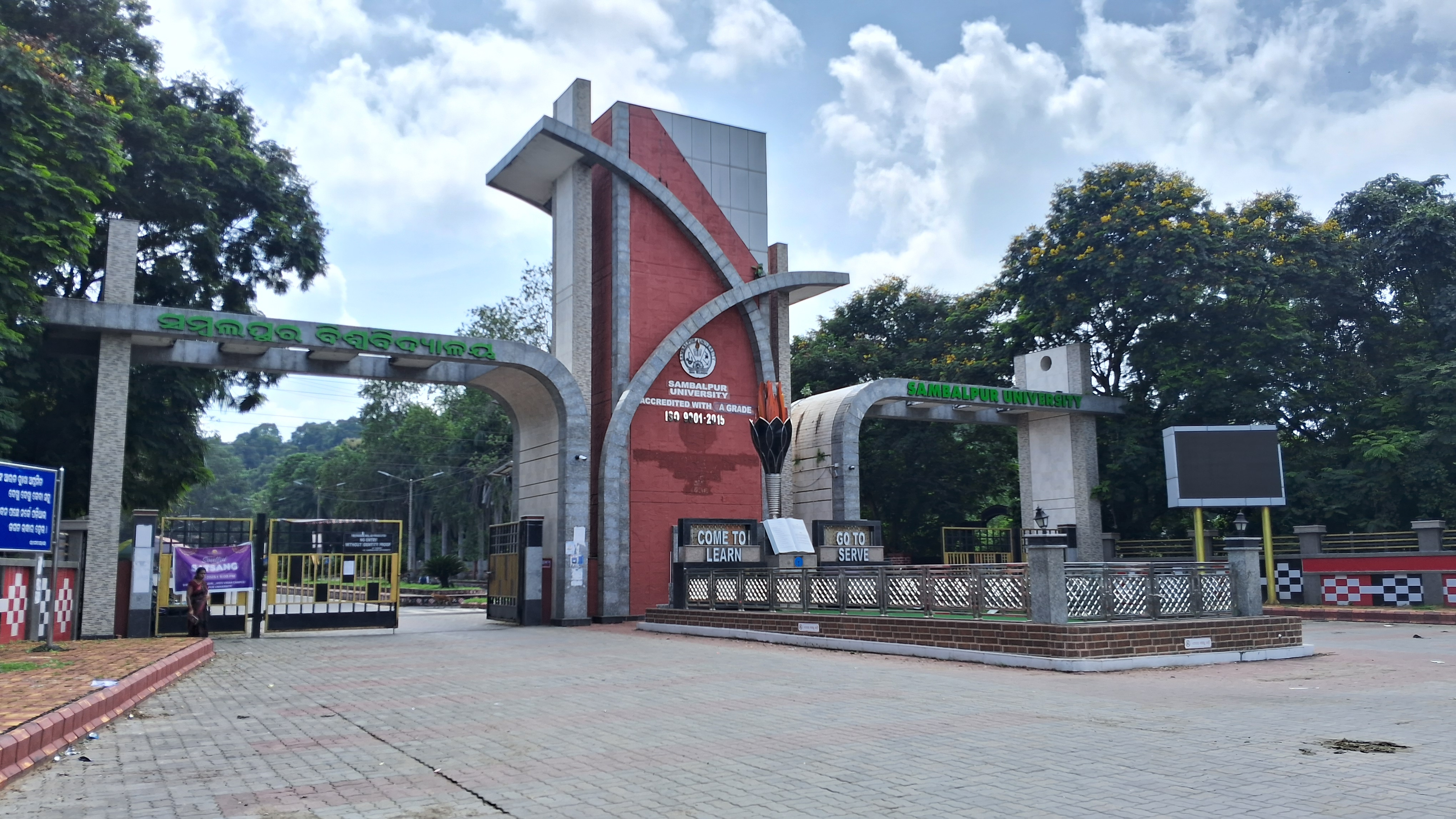
- ସମ୍ବଲପୁର ବିଶ୍ଵବିଦ୍ୟାଳୟ
- Motto: Vidyaya Vindatemrutam (Sanskrit)
- Motto in English: That is education which liberate
- Type: Public
- Established: 1 January 1967; 59 years ago
- Accreditation: NAAC
- Affiliations: UGC, NAAC
- Chancellor: Governor of Odisha
- Vice-Chancellor: Bidhu Bhushan Mishra
- Location: Sambalpur, Odisha, India; 20.473°N 85.891°E
- Campus: 670 acres (270 ha)
- Website: www.suniv.ac.in

Sambalpur University is a public research university located in Burla town, of district Sambalpur, India, in the state of Odisha. Popularly known as Jyoti Vihar, it offers courses at the undergraduate, post-graduate and doctoral (Ph.D.) levels. The governor of Odisha is the chancellor of the university. The campus is located 15 km away from Sambalpur.

== History ==
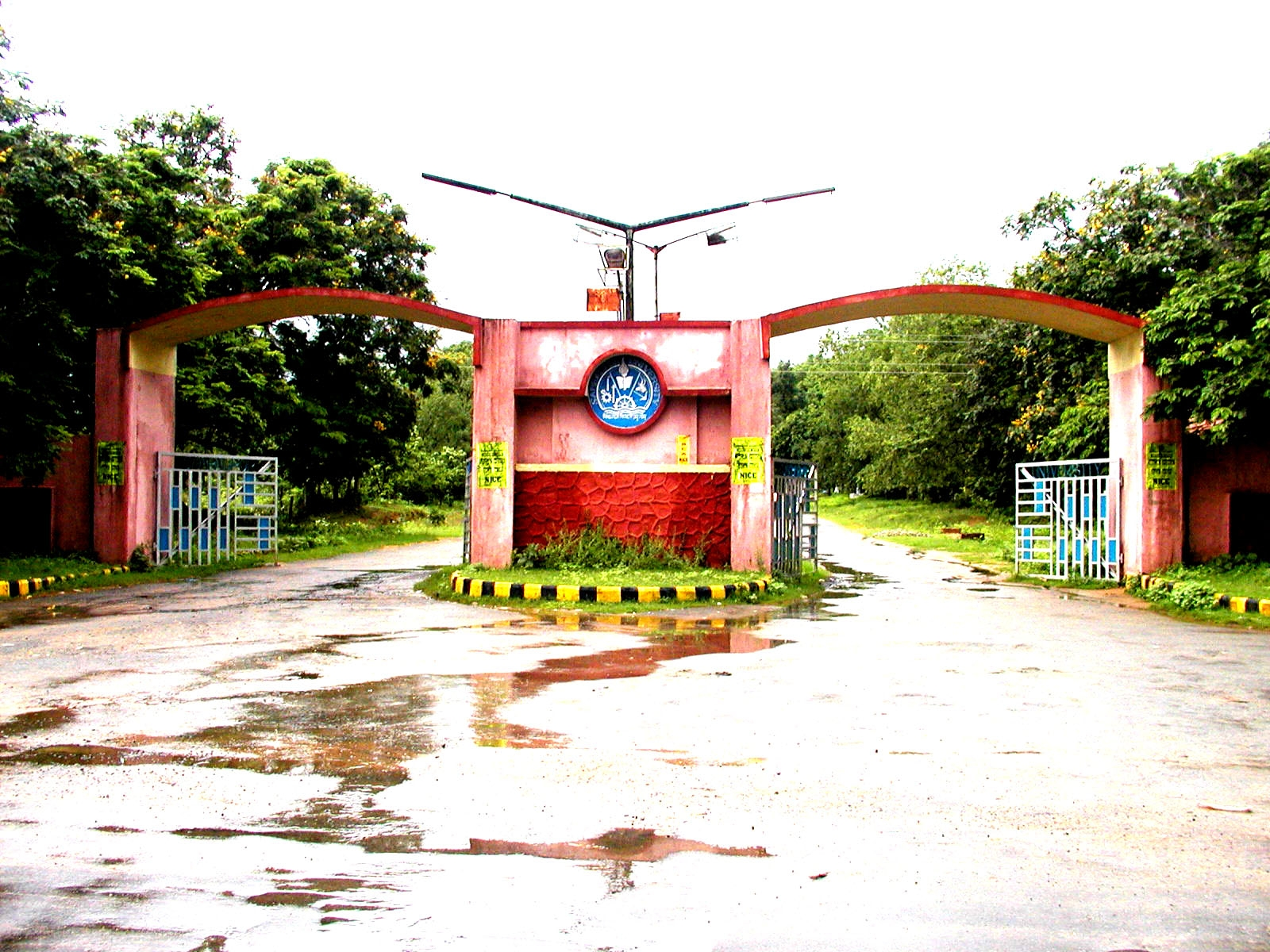
Samabalpur University old gate back to '90s

On 10 December 1966, the Odisha Legislature passed the Sambalpur University Act, which provided for the establishment of a university in the western part of Odisha. This institute started from 1 January 1967. The first vice-chancellor was Prof. Parasuram Mishra. The university started functioning in 1967 in a rented private building at Dhanupali, Sambalpur; then in a government building at Ainthapali, Sambalpur. In 1973 the university was shifted to the present campus named Jyoti Vihar at Burla.

== Location ==
The present campus of the university at Burla is 2 km away from NH 6. The campus is in the vicinity of Mahanadi Coal Fields Limited, VSSUT and located close to Hirakud Dam.

== Infrastructure and facilities ==
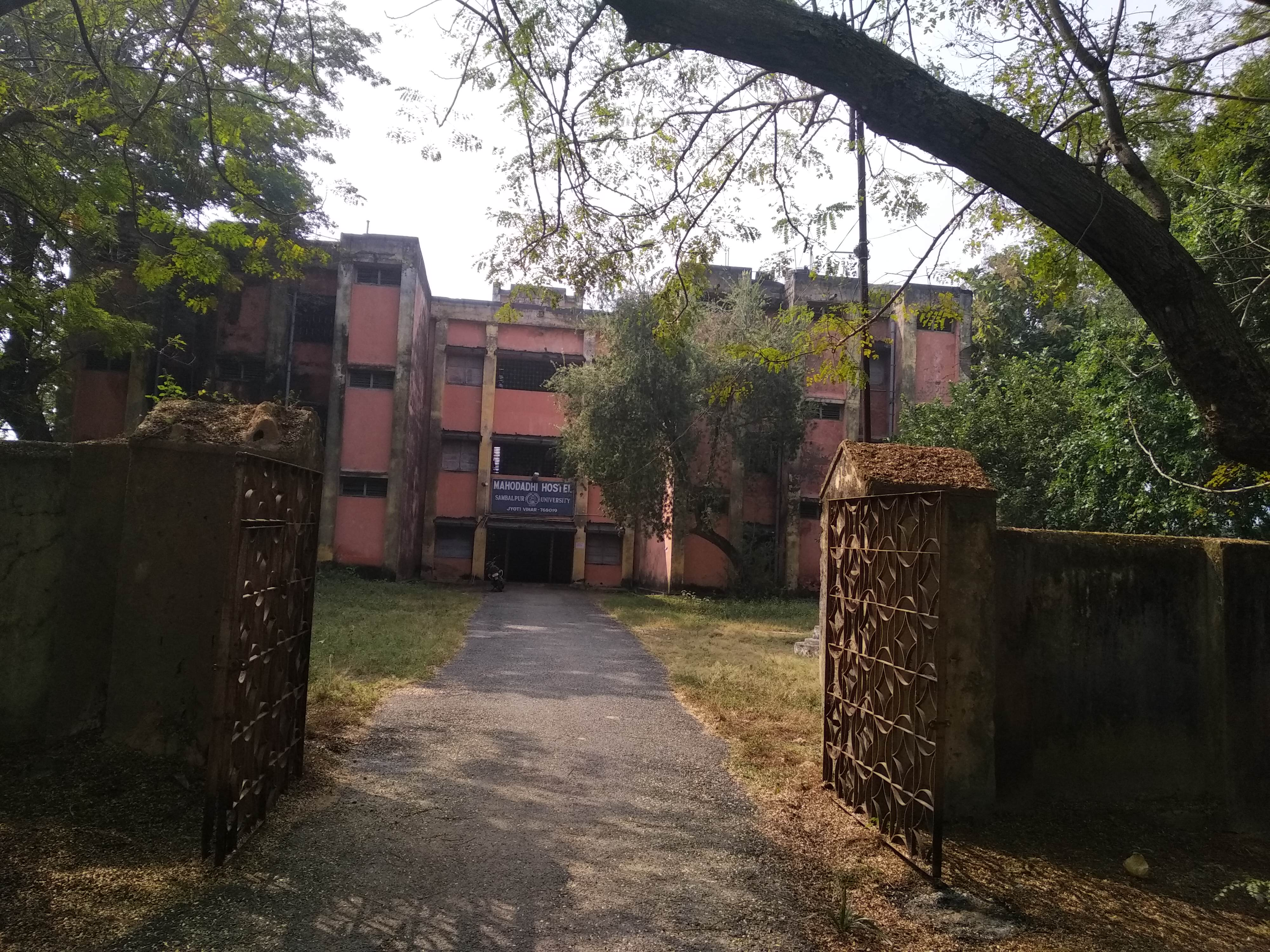
Mahodadhi Hostel

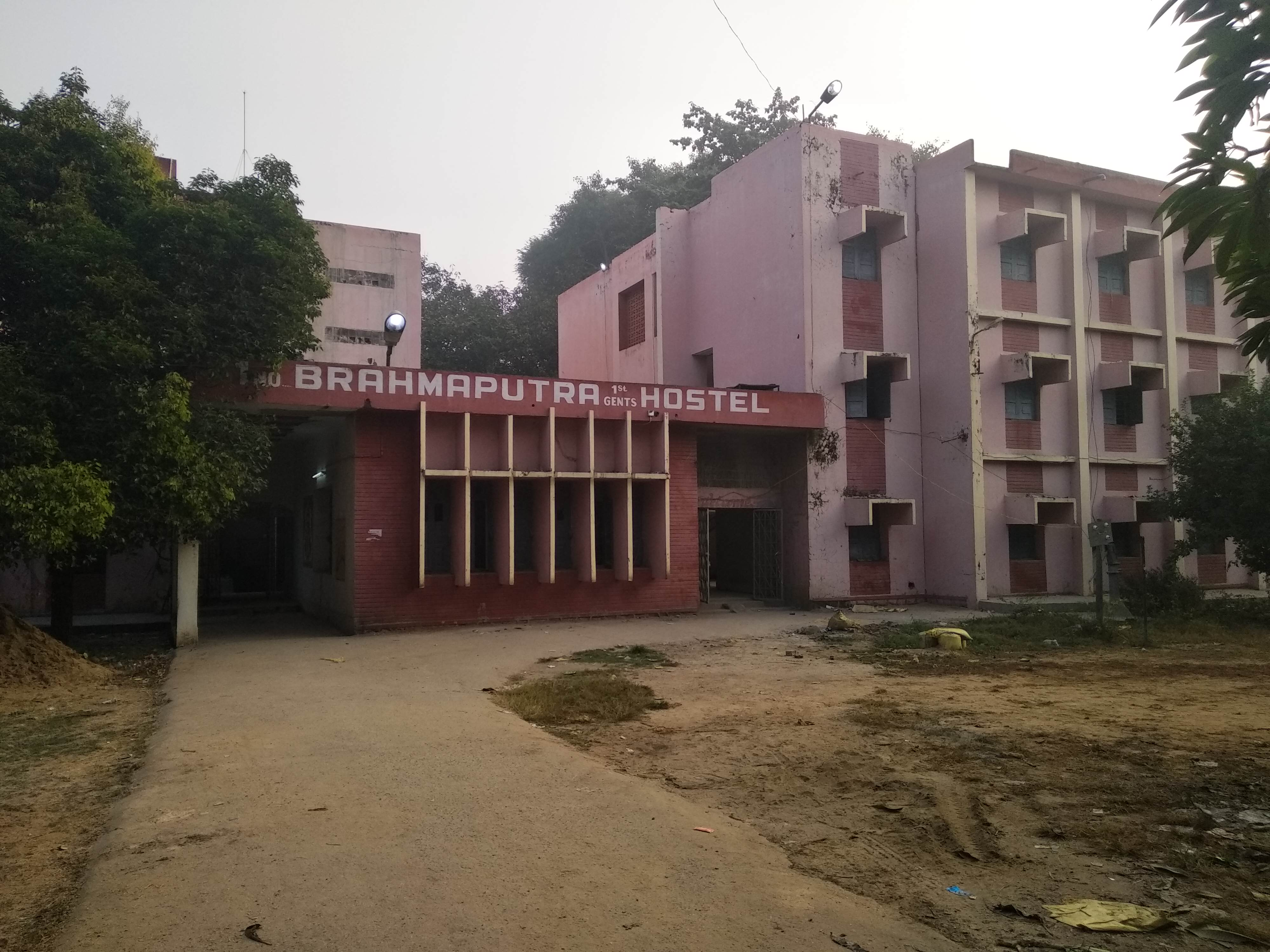
Brahmaputra 1st Gents Hostel

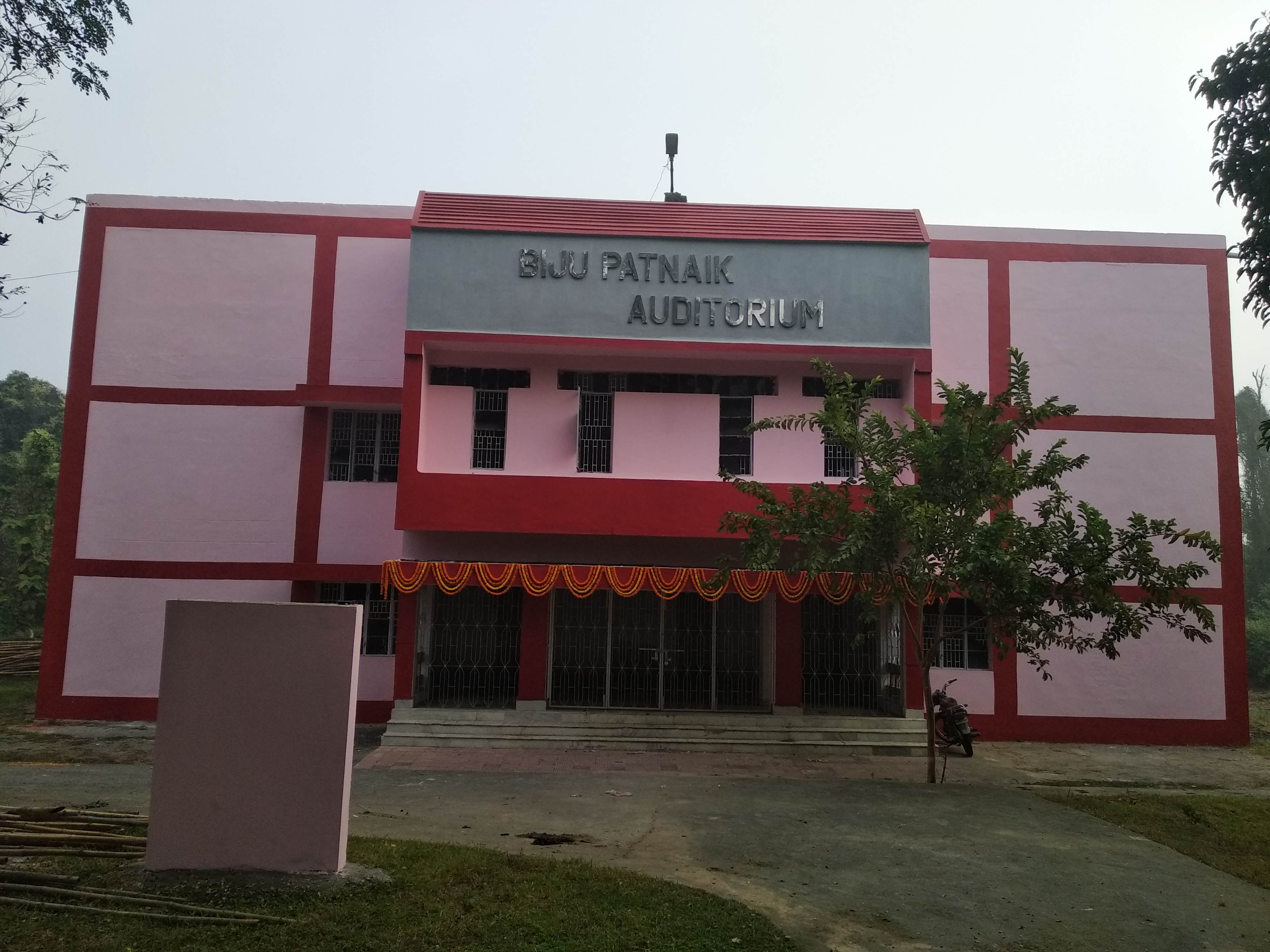
Biju Patnaik Auditorium

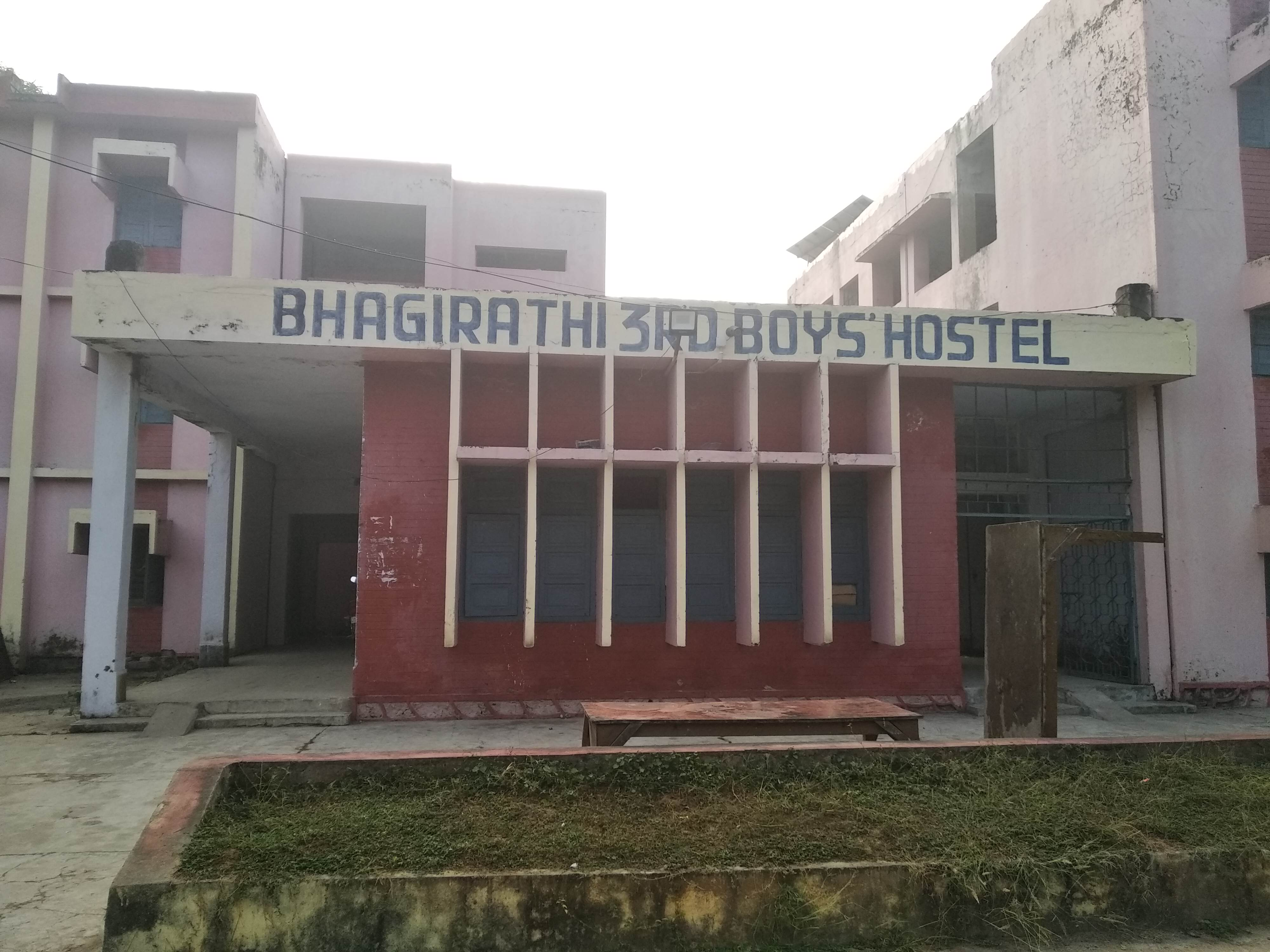
Bhagirathi 3rd boys Hostel

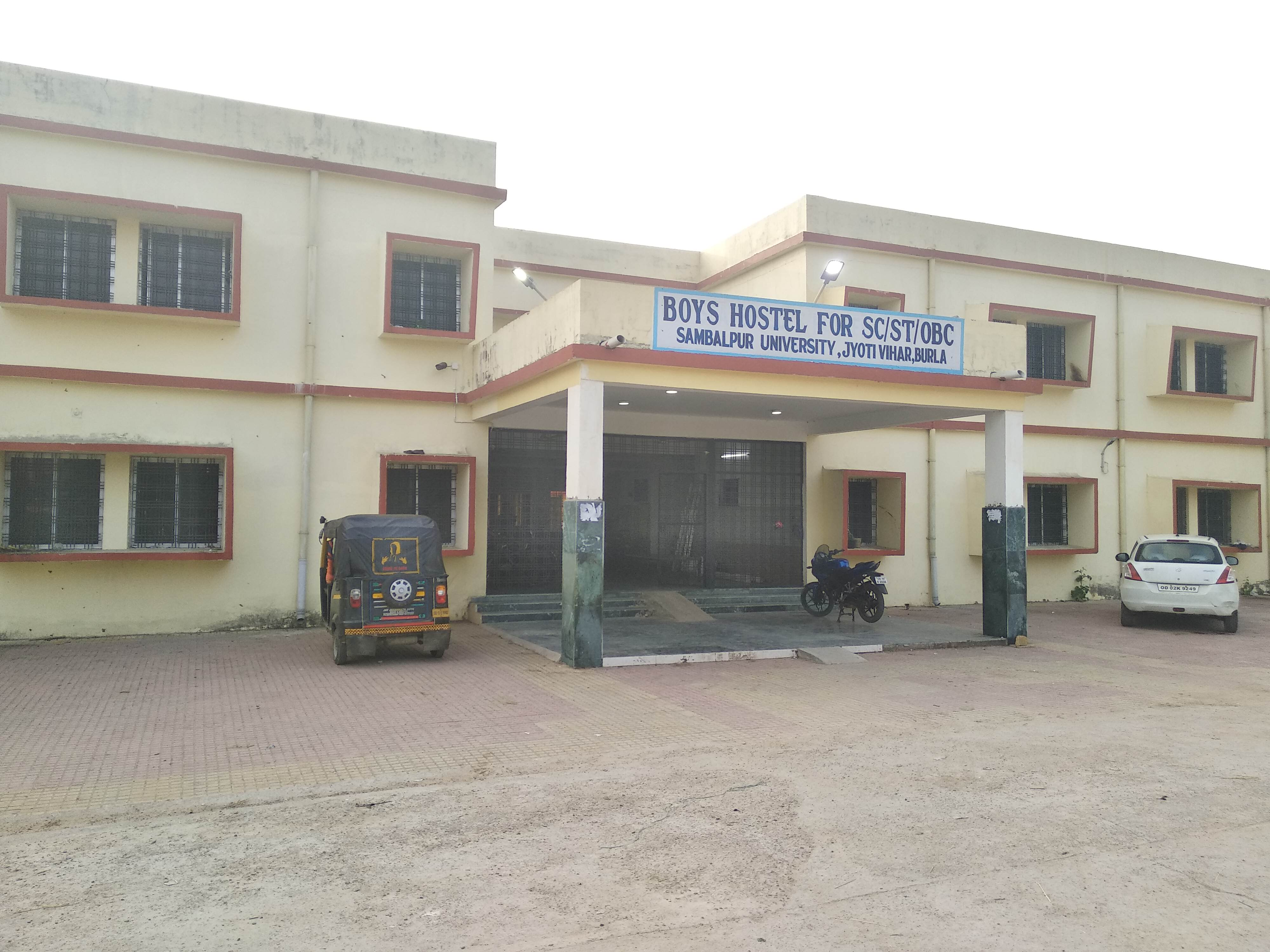
Ib Hostel

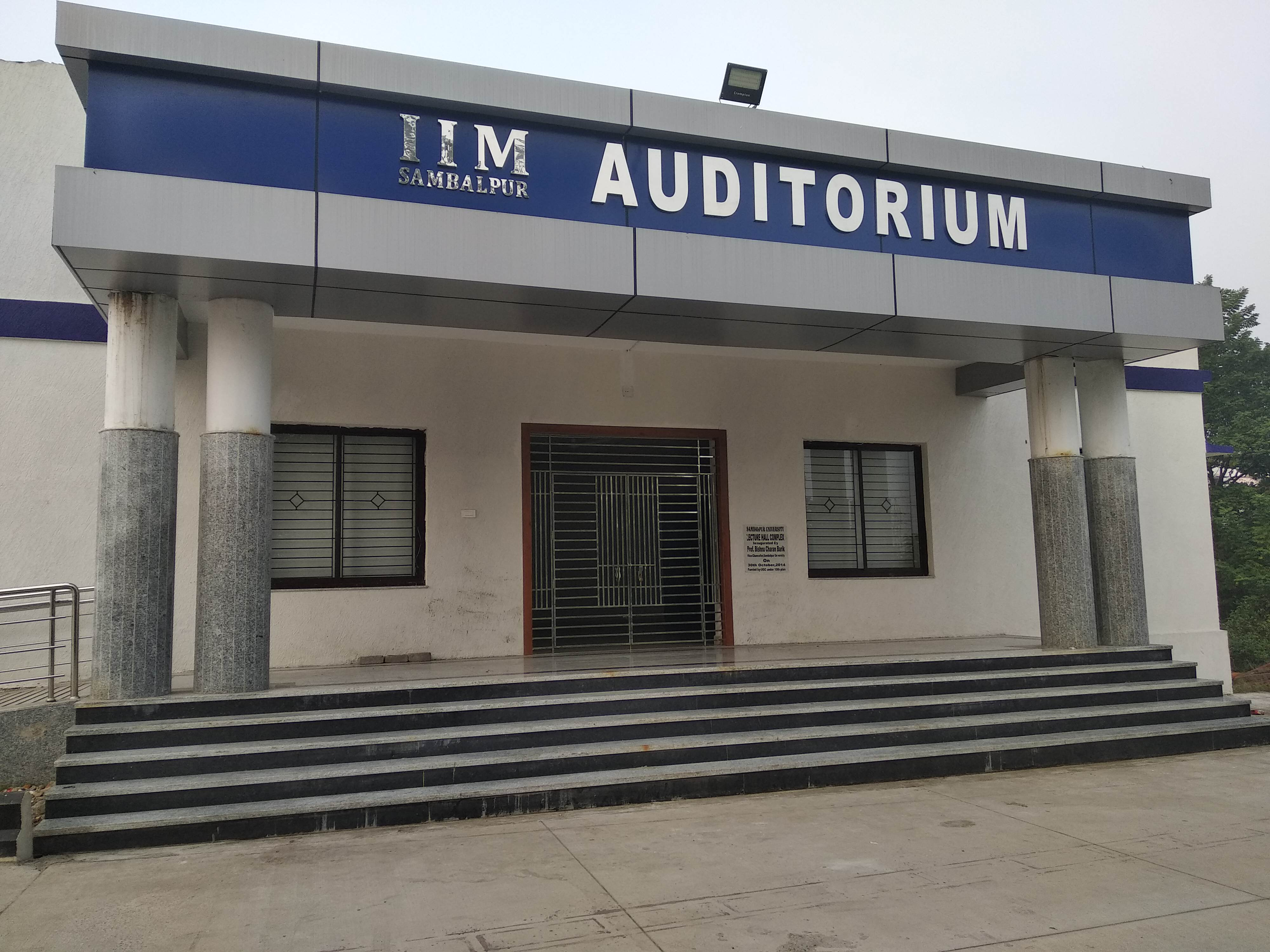
I.I.M Auditorium

Sambalpur University is located at Burla town, Odisha. The university is spread over 670 acre surrounded by dense reserve forest of Burla town. This university is said to be one of the knowledge hubs of Odisha.

There are postgraduate hostels in the university campus out of which seven are for girls (Narmada Ladies hostel, Pravavati Devi Ladies Hostel, Silver Jubilee ladies hostel, M.C.L Coalfield Ladies hostel (new), Baitarani Ladies Hostel, Indravati Ladies Hostel, I.I.M-S Ladies Hostel) and eight are for boys (Bramhaputra Boys Hostel, Mahanadi Boys Hostel, Bhagirathi Boys Hostel, Academic Staff Hostel, Mahodadhi M.phil Hostel, Golden Jubilee Boys Hostel, I.I.M-S Boys Hostel, I.B hostel or SC/ST/OBC Boys Hostel). The university provides basic facilities to the boarders in the hostels like common room with television, reading room with newspaper and magazine, guest room, first aid, STD telephone booth, canteen etc. There are two nationalized banks (State Bank Of India and U.C.O Bank), one post-office, one Health Center, 2 Auditorium Biju Patnaik Auditorium and I.I.M Auditorium, one Police-Out Post, one faculty house and one community center have been established in the university campus for providing services to students/teachers and employees in the campus.

Admission to PG diploma, M.A, M. Sc, M.Tech, M.Phil, M.C.A, M.B.A and P.hd courses are being conducted through an entrance examination.

== Academics ==
=== Undergraduate Course ===
+3 Arts/ Science/ Commerce, LLB, BBA-LLB B.A.-LLB, B.Ed, BCA, Bachelor of Journalism & Mass Communication, Bachelor of Library & Information Science, Bachelor of Physical Education (BPEd), BAMS, BHMS, MBBS, B. Sc. (Nursing) and Bachelor in Physiotherapy are offered by this University.

=== Post Graduate Department ===
The postgraduate (PG) departments of Sambalpur University offer PG Diploma, MA, M Sc., M Tech, M.Phil, PhD, and D.Sc degrees. All the departments are actively involved in research and well equipped for research facility for NET/JRF/GATE students. This university offers a limited numbers of scholarships for students to pursue their research work in various fields. Following are the courses taught in various fields.

The university provides post-graduation education in 42 subjects through 30 post-graduation departments, with Education and Centre of foreign Languages as the recently added department continuing from the year 2018.

P.G departments available in University Campus:

1. P.G Department of Anthropology - Established in 1976.
2. Department of Biotechnology and Bioinformatics (Self financing) - It was established in 2016. It provides self financing course in M.Sc. Biotechnology 2016, Bioinformatics (ii) M.Sc. Bioinformatics 2016, P.G. Diploma in Bioinformatics 2018.
3. Nano Research Centre - Established in 2017.
4. Department of Business Administration - It provides regular as well as self financing courses in Executive MBA estd. in 2004, MBA Rural Management estd. in 2012, MBA (Agri-Business) estd. in 2017. Recently there was a need felt to remove the self financing courses of M.B.A Rural Management due to less applicant, from the year 2020-21 the course may be discontinued according to the department coordinator.
5. School of Chemistry - Established in 1969, provides regular courses including self finance such as in M.Sc. Applied Chemistry.
6. Department of Computer Sciences and Applications - Established in 1988.
7. Department of Earth Science - Established in 1984. Provides regular, including self financing in M.Tech. Geospatial Technology 2011
8. M Tech in Geospatial Technology - Established in 2012.
9. P.G Department of Economics - Established in 1971. Provides regular, including self financing in (M.B.A, financial Management).
10. Centre for foreign Language (Self Financing) - Established in 2018, it offers Chinese Language, and French Language only.
11. Department of Education (Self Financing)- Established in 2017, recently established in the year 2018 with self financing in Integrated B.Ed-M.Ed.
12. Department of English - Established in 1969.
13. P.G Department of Environmental Science - Established in 1989, provides regular including self financing in M.Tech. Environmental Science & Engineering, M.Tech. in Safety, Health & Environmental Technology.
14. Department of Hindi - Established in 2010.
15. P.G Department of History - Established in 1969, there is one Museum in History department which is in the name of professor N.K Sahoo, called Prof. N. K Sahoo Museum. There is a Manuscript Conservation Centre (MCC) under the National Mission for Manuscripts which was established in 2003.
16. P.G Department of Home Science - Established in 1976.
17. P. G Department of Law - Established in 1986.
18. Library and Information Science - Established in 1976.
19. School of Life Sciences - Established in 1971, provides regular as well as self financing in M.Sc. Microbiology.
20. School of Mathematical Sciences - Established in 1969.
21. Department of Odia - Established in 1968.
22. School of Performing Arts (Dance & Drama) - Established in 2010, imparts education in Dance and Drama.
23. Political Science and public Administration - Established in 1967, M.A. in Political Science, P.G. Diploma in Human Rights Education, Certificate Course in Human Rights Education.
24. School of Physics - Established in 1969, Provides regular, including self financing in M.Sc. Medical Physics.
25. Sanskrit - Established in 2017, provides self financing course in M.A Sanskrit.
26. P.G Department of Sociology - Established in 1991.
27. Department of Statistics - Established in 1976.
28. P.G Department of Social Work- Master of Social work (Self Financing) - Established in 2017, provides self financing course in Master of Social Work.
29. Master in Performing Arts - Established in 2010.
30. P.G Department of Food Science Technology (FST & FS) and Nutrition (Self Financing) - Established in 2010, recently established in 2017 with self financing course in MTech. Food Sc. & Tech., M.Sc. Food Science, M.Sc. Food Sc. & Nutrition

Miscellaneous buildings include: Administrative block, P.G Council, Private Examination Cell, Sbi Bank Branch with 2 atm, Post Office, Health centre, Sambalpur University, Market Complex, Prof. Bhubaneshwar Behera Central Library, Sambalpur University New Library, UCO bank, Kantapali 1 atm, Home Cum Canteen ( University Canteen), Central Canteen 1, Canteen 2, U.G.C - H.R.D.C Lecture Hall, U.S.I.C Sambalpur University, U.G.C Human Resources Development Center, Sambalpur University, Bhagirathi Canteen (Hostel Canteen), I.B Canteen (Hostel Canteen)

Post Graduate courses include: Post Graduate courses that are offered by this institution include Anthropology, Business Administration, Chemistry, Earth Science, Economics, English, Environmental Science, Hindi, History, Home Science, Library and Information Science, Life Science, Mathematics, Odia, Performing Arts (Drama, Dance), Political Science and public administration, Sociology and Statistics.

2 Post Graduate Diploma Courses include: Computer Application and Human Rights Education

1 Certificate course include: Human Rights Education

2 Professional courses include: It include L.L.M. and M.B.A.

9 Self financing courses include:

M. Sc. in Applied Chemistry, M. Tech. in Environmental Science & Engineering, M. Tech. in Geospatial Technology, M. Sc. in Biotechnology, Executive M.B.A., MBA (Financial Management), Master of Social Work (MSW), M. Sc. in Food Science & Nutrition, M. Tech. in Food Science & Technology

19 M. Phil Courses include: Anthropology, Business Administration, Chemistry, Computer Science, Earth Science, Economics, English, Environmental Science, History, Home Science, Library & Information Science, Life Sciences, Mathematics, Odia, Political Science, Public Administration, Physics, Sociology, Statistics.

28 P.hd Course include: Anthropology, Chemistry, Earth Science, Economics, English, Environmental Science, History, Home Science, Library & Information Science, Law, Life Sciences, Mathematics, Odia, Political Science & Public Administration, Physics, Sociology, Statistics, Food Science and Technology, Environmental Engineering, Bio Technology, Computer Science, Information Technology, Bio informatics, Electronic and Engineering, Linguistics, Remote Sensing and GIS, Management, MSW

On campus distance education

The Directorate of Distance and Continuing Education has started in the year 1998.

It include P.G. Diploma in Industrial Chemistry, P.G. Diploma in Environment Education & Management, P.G. Diploma in Industrial Safety & Management, P.G. Diploma in Mass Communication & Journalism, P.G. Diploma in Library Automation & Networking, P.G. Diploma in Social Work & HRD, P.G. Diploma in Remote Sensing & GIS, MBA (3 years).

This university includes 1 autonomous constituent institute -S.U.I.I.T (Sambalpur University Institute of Information Technology) .

Course offered by S.U.I.I.T are B. Tech. in ECE, B. Tech. in CSE, B. Tech. in EEE, M. Sc, in Electronics, M. Sc. in Computer Science, M. Sc. in Bioinformatics, MCA, M. Tech in CS, M. Tech in ESD, M. Tech in CSE.

=== Other courses include ===
University also offers DEM, Diploma in Regional Arts & Commerce, PGDCA, PGDIRPM.

== Affiliated colleges ==
Colleges that are affiliated to Sambalpur University belong to the districts of Western Odisha namely Sundargarh, Deogarh, Jharsuguda, Sambalpur, Bargarh, Boudh, and from the Athmallik sub division of Angul district.

== Gangadhar National Award ==
This award is given in the field of Literature. The award was first given in 1991 but the procedure of giving award was started in 1989. There is a delay of 1 year due to a long process of choosing an awardee, if the awardee won the prize for the year 2019 then he will get his award in the Year 2021, and the award of 2017 will be given in the year 2019. It is awarded on the celebration day of Sambalpur University foundation day, Foundation day is celebrated every year in January. Till now 28 poets have been awarded on various Indian Languages. Cash prize of Rs 50,000, angavastra, citation, a memento and a copy of Gangadhar Meher: Selected Works (An anthology of Gangadhar Meher's Poetry in English translation) is given to receipt of Gangadhar National Award.

== Notables ==
=== Notable alumni ===
- Notable alumni in politics include Naba Kishore Das, Bhakta Charan Das, Pradipta Kumar Naik, Prabhas Kumar Singh, Kapil Narayan Tiwari, Jyotirmoy Singh Mahato.
- Notable alumni in Indian film Indian film industry include producer Jitendra Mishra, Ashutosh Pattnaik.
- Notable alumni in science include mathematician Indulata Sukla, Gadadhar Misra, Karamat Ali Karamat. Chemistry Professor Bijay K Mishra is a notable scientist being awarded Samanta Chandra Sekhar Award from OBA and Prof BN Ghosh Memorial award from ISSST. Bhubaneswar Behera, botanist, Indian ecologist and environmentalist Madhab Chandra Dash and educationist Parshuram Mishra who is the recipient of Padma Shri and neurosurgeon B. K. Misra, recipient of Dr. B. C. Roy Award, the highest medical honour in India.
- Notable alumni in poetry include Gopal Rath, Hussain Rabi Gandhi, Mayadhar Swain, Srinivas Udgata, Mayadhar Swain.

Notable alumni in Sports include Dilip Tirkey a sportsperson who received honorary doctorate from Sambalpur University, Sujata Kujur, Indian hockey player.

=== Other notables ===
Prem Ram Dubey who became dean of law of Sambalpur University in 1967, Ananta Charan Sukla scholar of comparative literature, literary criticism, and philosophy. Priyambada Mohanty Hejmadi who was a former vice chancellor of Sambalpur University.

Sriballav Panigrahi who was the member of the Senate and Syndicate, Sambalpur University from 1969 to 1972.

== Notable events ==
=== Ceremony ===
Odisha Governor Ganeshi Lal, Principal Secretary to the PMO, Pramod Kumar Mishra attended 30th convocation ceremony 2019.

=== Disputes ===
There had been attempts to make self financing courses like B.Ed and M.Ed eligible for central and state level teacher eligibility test. There are at least 150 students who are studying integrated courses offered from 2017. This integrated course is also offered by other universities like North Odisha University, Fakir Mohan University and Rajendra University since 2016.

The first year batch of 2017 in Sambalpur University integrated B.Ed and M.Ed students were exempted from applying Odisha Teacher Eligibility test, Central Teacher Eligibility test and the Odisha Secondary School Teacher Eligibility test for not displaying their degree in their website, for which they were not able to apply for various entrance examination .

In 2019 there was a strike conducted by the students of Medical physics for not recognising one of the self financing course of physics department called M.Sc Medical physics. The course offered by this university was not recognised by Atomic Energy Regulatory Board (AERB) for which students cannot apply for posts like a Medical physicist. Students have called for hunger strike for its exclusion form being recognised by AERB .

There had been delay in the results of 1st year students in Bhima Bhoi Medical College and Hospital (BBMCH) which started functioning in September 2018, affiliated to the Sambalpur University for which students were on strike.

=== Changes in system ===
Odisha government in 2019 approved that academic activities of 155 colleges which are under Sambalpur University will be transferred to new universities which will commence from June 1, 2020. Government Autonomous College, Bhawanipatna, and Rajendra Autonomous College, Balangir, will be upgraded to university status which will later take colleges under their jurisdiction.

There had been attempts to make this a central university.

== See also ==
- Sambalpur University Institute of Information Technology
- List of colleges affiliated to the Sambalpur University
