= Veer Surendra Sai University of Technology =

Public unitary technical university in Odisha, India

- Former names: University College of Engineering, Burla
- Motto: Siddhirbhawati Karmajā (Sanskrit)
- Type: Public Technical University
- Established: 1956
- Chancellor: Governor of Odisha
- Vice-Chancellor: Dipak Sahoo
- Administrative staff: 260
- Students: 5089
- Undergraduates: 4400
- Postgraduates: 689
- Location: Burla, Sambalpur, Odisha, India; 21.4973°N 83.9040°E
- Campus: 502 acres (203 ha); Urban
- Website: www.vssut.ac.in

Veer Surendra Sai University of Technology, formerly known as the University College of Engineering, Burla, is a state university located in Burla, Sambalpur, Odisha, India. Established in 1956, it is the oldest engineering college in Odisha. UCE Burla, its former name, was officially changed to its current name on 10 June 2009, as a result of a resolution by the Government of Odisha to accord it with the status of a unitary university.

In 2012, the university was declared eligible to receive central assistance under Section 12B of the University Grants Commission Act, 1956.

== History ==
Veer Surendra Sai University of Technology was initially founded as University College of Engineering(UCE), Burla, under the direction of the Government of Odisha, as the first engineering college of the state, in 1956. The primary purpose of the college was to supplement white collar workers, in the form of electrical, civil, and mechanical engineers, to the nearby Hirakud Dam project. The foundation for the college was laid by the first Prime Minister of the country, Jawaharlal Nehru. The first batch contained 20 students, consisting of 3 branches, namely Civil Engineering, Electrical Engineering and Mechanical Engineering. The university later passed on to the administrative control of the Sambalpur University, and then under the control of the Biju Patnaik University of Technology. In 2008, the students of UCE actively campaigned for due recognition as an independent university, culminating in the university being founded in 2009.

== Programmes offered ==
- Bachelor of Technology (B.Tech.)
- Bachelor of Architecture (B.Arch)
- Master of Technology(M.Tech.)
- Master of Science(M.Sc.)
- Master of Philosophy (M.Phil.)
- Master in Computer Application(MCA)
- Doctor of Philosophy(Ph.D.)

== Campus ==
The university, located close to the Hirakud Dam, occupies about 350 acres in Burla. Facilities in laboratories of various departments and central facilities such as Computer Centre, Library, Internet Centre and Central Workshop, separate hostels for boys and girls, conference hall, recreational amenities and other utility services are available for the students in the campus. Government of Odisha also decided to extend the campus to another 80 acre and also approved a mass amount of ₹2000 crore for the development of VSSUT.

=== Halls of Residence ===
The university provides on-campus residential facilities to its students, research scholars, faculty members and many of its staff. The students live in hostels (referred to as halls of residence) throughout their stay in the campus. Hostel rooms are wired for internet, for which students pay a compulsory charge. There are 11 halls of residences including 5 for girls and 6 for boys.

- Marichi Hall of Residence
- Atri Hall of Residence
- Kratu Hall of Residence
- Arundhati Hall of Residence
- Anuradha Hall of Residence
- Vasistha Hall of Residence
- Visakha Hall of Residence
- Angira Hall of Residence
- Pulastya Hall of Residence
- Rohini Hall of Residence
- Vasundhara Hall of Residence
- Pulaha Hall of Residence
- Agastya Hall of Residence

== Notable Alumuni ==
- Anil Pradhan (B.Tech. '17), social entrepreneur, educator, co-founder of Young Tinker Foundation, and Forbes 30 Under 30 Asia 2025 honouree (Social Impact).
- Vaishali Sharma (B.Tech. '17), educator, social entrepreneur, co-founder of Young Tinker Foundation, and Forbes 30 Under 30 Asia 2025 honouree (Social Impact).
- Sujeet Kumar (politician) (BE '98), Member of Parliament, Rajya Sabha (Upper House) of Indian Parliament and Author
- Dr. Binay Kumar Das: Distinguished Scientist and Director General (EC Systems) at DRDO.
- Prof.Sukumar Mishra: Professor at IIT Delhi and Director of IIT Dhanbad.
- Pinakiranjan Mishra: Partner and Country Head at Ernst & Young (EY) India.
- Prof. Braja Mohan Das: Renowned geotechnical engineer, author, and Dean Emeritus at California State University, Sacramento.
- Sanjay Burman: Outstanding scientist and Director of the Centre for Artificial Intelligence and Robotics (CAIR), Bengaluru.Prof.
- Bibhuti Bhushan Biswal: First Vice-Chancellor of the Odisha University of Technology and Research (OUTR)

== Achievements ==
- AIR-1 in Design, Go-green and CAE event at BAJA-SAE India 2020 at Punjab
- AIR-1 in Dirt-X and Endurance event at Enduro Student India 2017 at Coimbatore by BAJA-SAE team.
- AIR-3 in MATLAB Innovation for ROBOCON-2018
- AIR-2 in EYANTRA Robotic Competition conducted by IIT, Bombay & MHRD
- SAE Team secured 3rd in the Cost Presentation Event and 4th in Design Evaluation Event at FFS INDIA 2k19, Coimbatore. They even secured an overall rank of 7th in the complete event.
- Winners at India Innovation Growth Programme (IIGP 2.0) organised TATA Trust & DST
- Student satellite program in Limca book of records.
- The student satellite Team was called on by the Prime Minister, Mr Narendra Modi in his monthly radio address, Mann ki Baat, for their resounding success in developing fully functional prototypes of satellite launch vehicles.
- Winners of University Challenge, IIGP 2018(Indian Innovation Growth Programme) 2.0, Government of India.

== Rankings ==
The National Institutional Ranking Framework gave the institution a rank in the 151-200 band in the engineering category and university category.

University rankings

General – India
- NIRF (Overall) (2023): 151-200
- NIRF (Universities) (2024): 151-200

Engineering – India
- NIRF (2024): 151-200

== See also ==
- Veer Surendra Sai Institute of Medical Sciences and Research
- IIT Bhubaneswar
- NIT Rourkela
- Biju Patnaik University of Technology

== Additional links ==
- https://www.bput.ac.in
