= Western Odisha Development Council =

Western Odisha Development Council (WODC) is an administrative set-up established by the government of Odisha on 11 November 1998. This council was particularly established to bring development in the backward western Odisha region. This organization is highly criticized by politicians, and members of the civil society as it has failed to live up to the expectations. Many says that formation of the Western Orissa Development Council is an acknowledgement of regional imbalance, and term it as "rehabilitation platform" for the ruling party. The Odisha State Legislative Assembly demanding removal of the chairperson of the Western Odisha Development Council (WODC) and its expert members.
