= Sambalpur State =

Former princely state of India

Coordinates: 21.47°N 83.97°E

Sambalpur State ସମ୍ବଲପୁର
- Princely State of British India
- 1570–1848
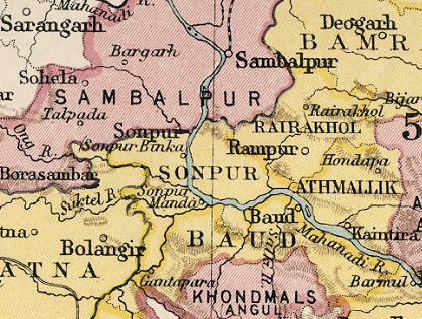
- Former state of Sambalpur as a British district in pink in the Imperial Gazetteer of India
- Capital: Sambalpur
- Area
  - 1817: 39,224 km^{2} (15,144 sq mi)
- History
  - Foundation of the state: 1570
  - Annexed by the British Raj: 1848
| Succeeded by |
| Presidencies and provinces of British India |

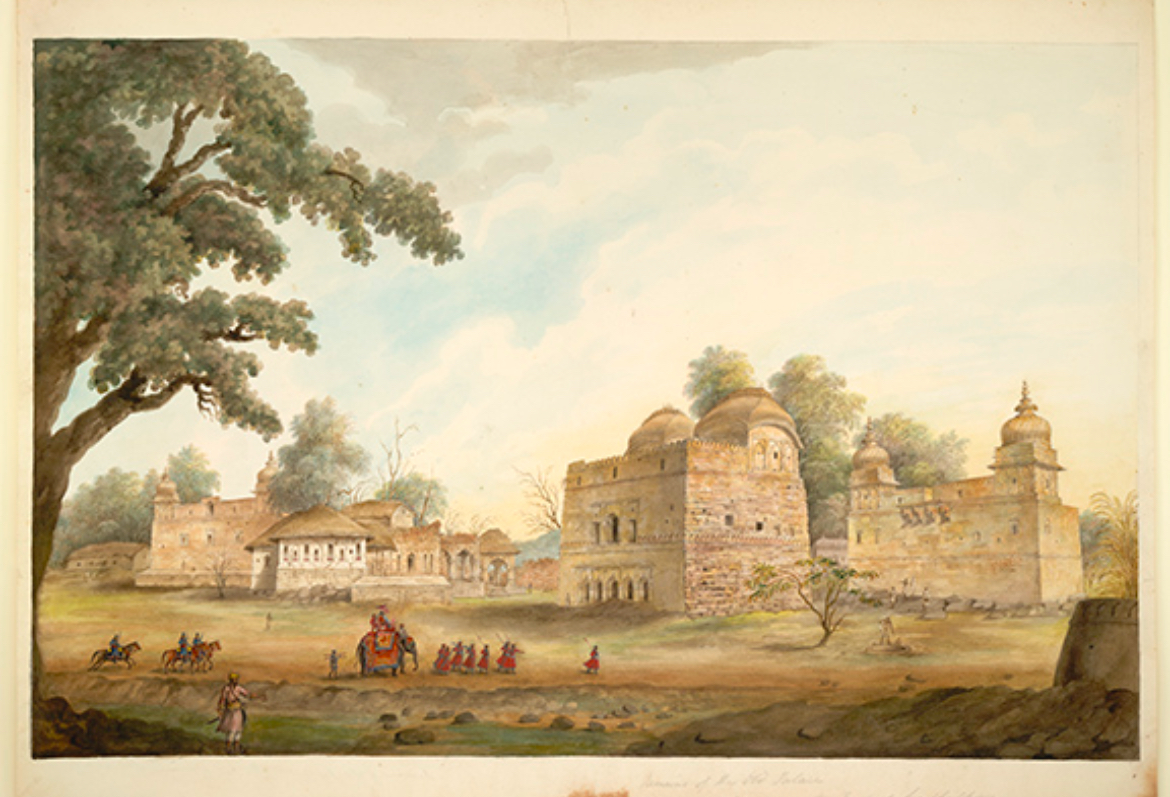
The clusters of palaces in Sambalpur, 19th century

Sambalpur State, also known as Hirakhand Kingdom, was a kingdom founded in 1570. It ruled over Western Odisha and Eastern Chhattisgarh in central-eastern India prior to the Maratha occupation in 1800 AD. From 1849 AD, it was integrated with British Raj as a British District. Its capital was present-day Sambalpur city in Western Odisha. The state was known as Hirakhand kingdom due to its famed diamond mines. The state was also called the Garhjat states. The Chauhans were one of the most influential dynasties who made significant contributions to the culture here.

== History ==
Sambalpur State was founded in the mid-16th century by Balarama Deva, a Rajput from Chauhan dynasty and younger brother of Patna State's ruler Raja Narsingh Deva. In 1570 CE, the Patna State, ruled by the Chauhan dynasty, was bifurcated. The southern portion of the Ang River was ruled by Narasingh Deva and his brother Balaram Deva received the northern side of the river of Sambalpur region. Balaram Deb established his new capital at Sambalpur. Sambalpur was ruled by the Chauhan dynasty till 1800. The kingdom of Sambalpur was also known as Hirakhand and Sambalpur was its capital.

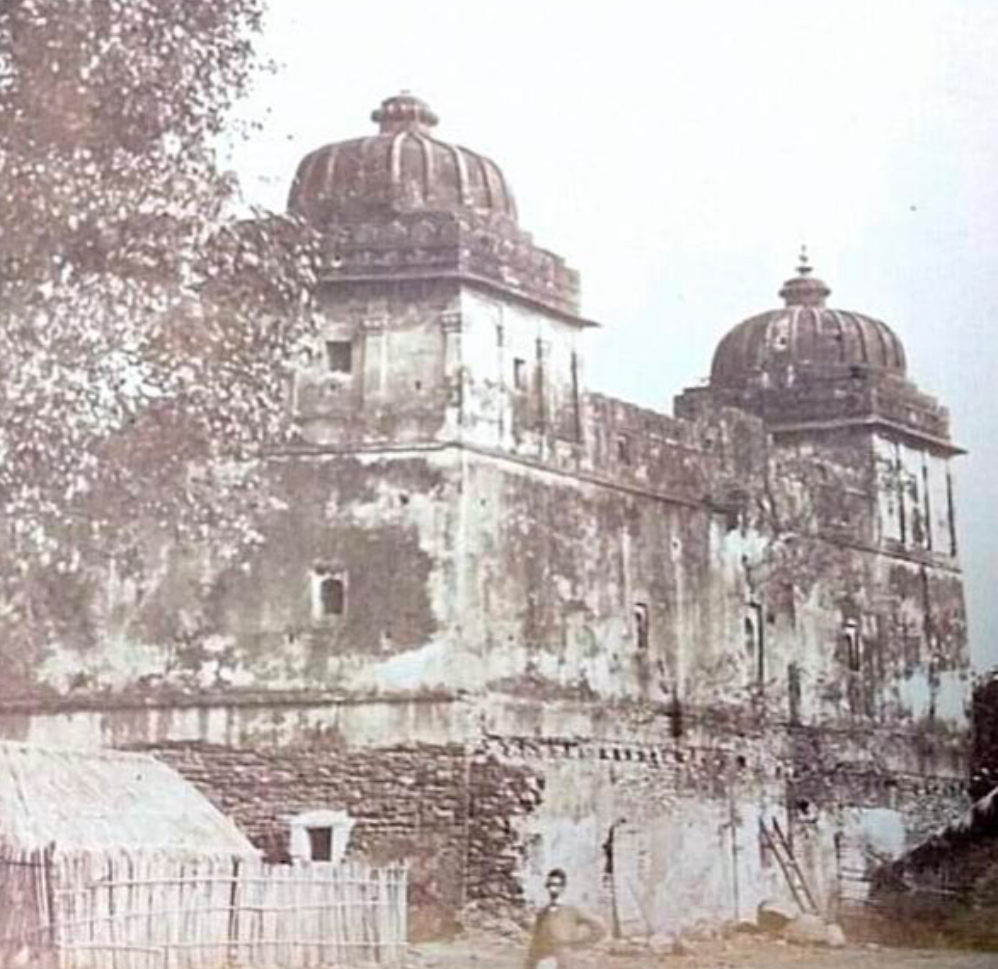
An old photograph of Jemadei Mahal or Rani Bakhri built by the Chauhans

The Garhjat states were eighteen vassal states under Sambalpur State. The Sambalpur kings favoured Sarangarh State owing to the readiness of its rulers to help their kingdom during military campaigns. Sambalpur was ruled by the Chauhan dynasty till 1800 when Sambalpur came under the Bhonsle dynasty of Nagpur State.

Sambalpur was invaded and occupied by the Marathas between 1808 and 1817. After the Third Anglo-Maratha War in 1817 the British Government returned Sambalpur to the Chauhan king, Jayant Singh, but his authority over its eighteen vassal states was withdrawn. The state was placed under British administration from 1818 to 1820, when local rule was restored and the principality became a British protectorate. When the ruler or the state died without a direct male heir in 1849, the British seized the state under the doctrine of lapse.

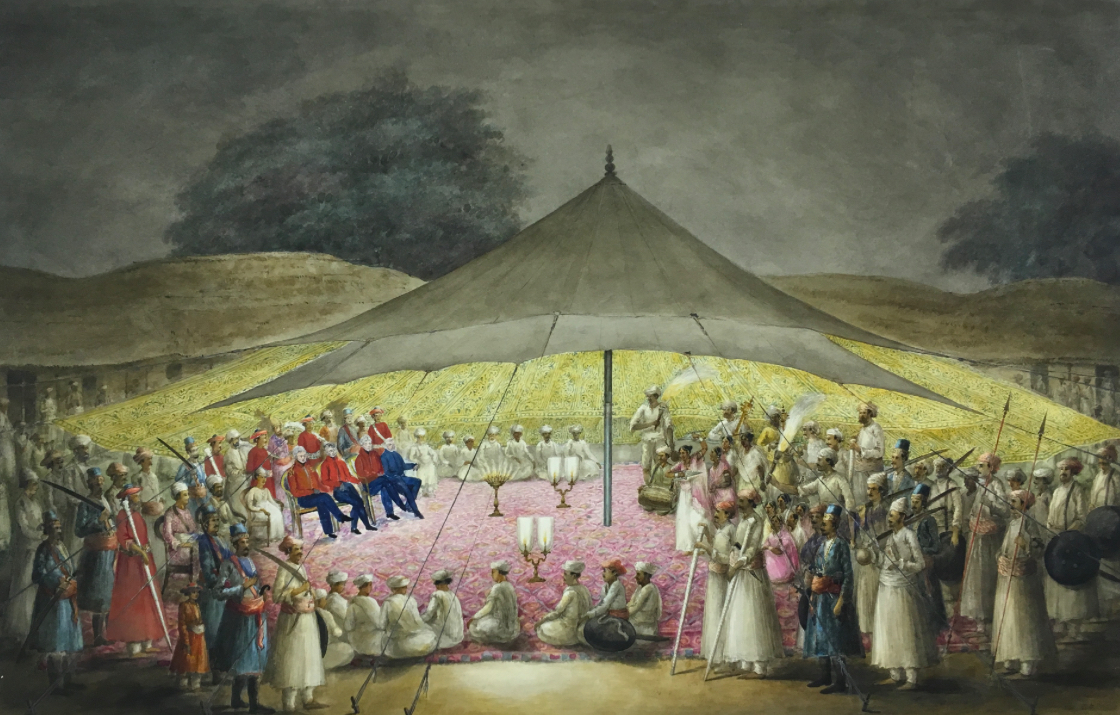
The Raja of Sambalpur entertaining Britain officials with a nautch

In 1857 during the Sepoy Mutiny there was a rebellion led by Surendra Sai of the Sambalpur ruling family, later renowned as 'Veer' (hero) Surendra Sai. The mutineers broke open the prison at Hazaribagh, where Surendra Sai was imprisoned and released all the prisoners. Surendra Sai fought against the British after reaching Sambalpur, eventually surrendering when the British suppressed the rebellion. In 1858 when Sambalpur was put under British administration it initially became part of the Cuttack division of the Bengal Presidency, but was transferred to the Central Provinces in 1862.

== Rulers ==
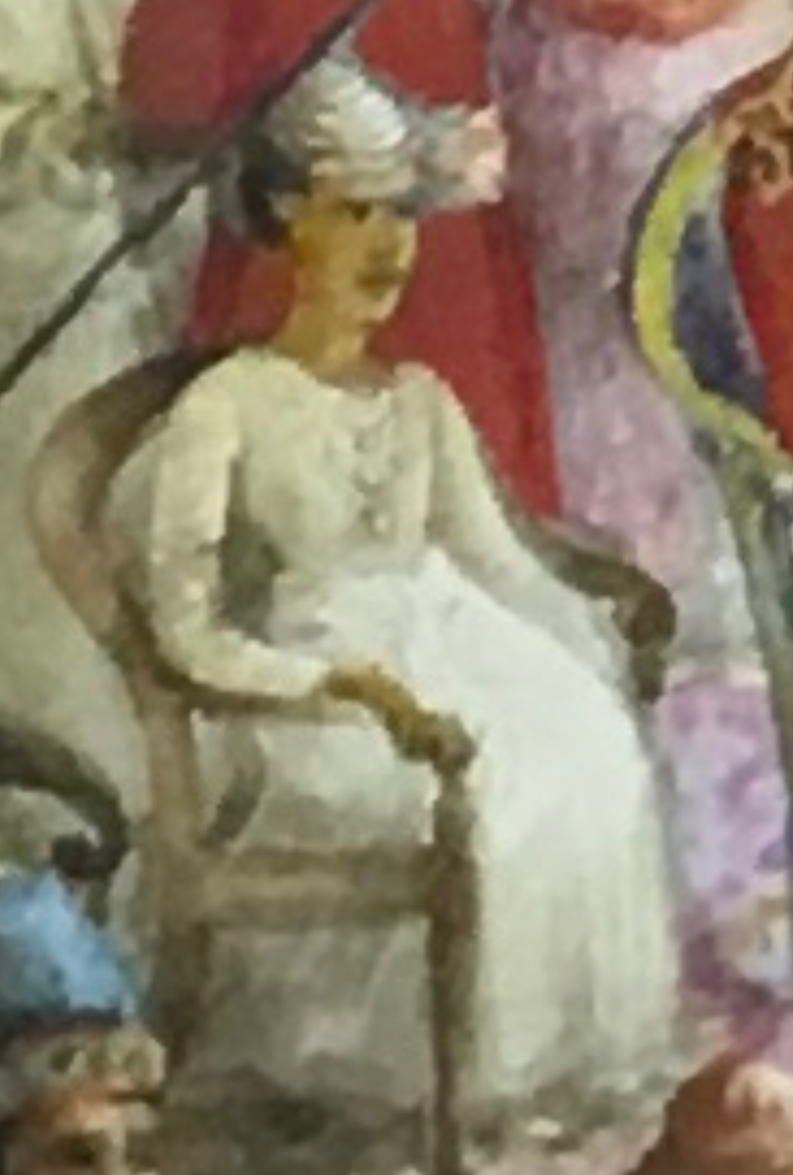
Maharaj Sai, the Raja of Sambalpur in a public durbar with British officials

The rulers of Sambalpur state of the Chauhan Dynasty:

- Balarama Deva (1570 - 1595 CE)
- Hrdayanarayana Deva (1595 - 1605)
- Balabhadra Deva (1605 - 1630)
- Madhukar Deva (1630-1660)
- Baliar Deva (1650-1688)
- Ratan Singh (1688 - 1690)
- Chhatra Sai (1690 - 1725)
- Ajit Singh (1725 - 1766)
- Abhaya Singh (1766-1778)
- Balabhadra Singh (1778 - 1781)
- Jayanta Singh (1781 - 1818)
- Maharaj Sai (1820 - 1827)
- Rani Mohan Kumari (f) (1827 - 1833)
- Narayan Singh (1833 - 1849)
- Rani Mukhyapan Devi (f) (1849 - 1849)
- Surendra Sai (in rebellion) (1809 - 1884)

== See also ==
- Maratha Empire
- Doctrine of lapse
- History of Sambalpur
- Timeline of Sambalpur
