= Paanch Amrut =

Poetry by Haldhar Nag

Paanch Amrut (Five Nectars of Immortality)
- by Haldhar Nag
- Language: Sambalpuri
- Lines: 6

Paanch Amrut is a poem by Indian poet Haldhar Nag, written in Sambalpuri. It was later translated into English by Surendra Nath as Five Nectars of Immortality, which is included in the Kavyanjali Vol.1 and in the Haldhar Nag Selected Poems. It is also the first poem in Kavyanjali.

The "five nectars of immortality" in the poem refer to the seven seas (Note: That is: North Pacific, South Pacific, North Atlantic, South Atlantic, Indian Ocean, Arctic Ocean, and Southern Ocean.), the moon in the skies, mother's breast, noble principles, and the poet's scribbles.
