= Madho Singh (Ghess) =

Indian rebel

Madhab Singh Bariha
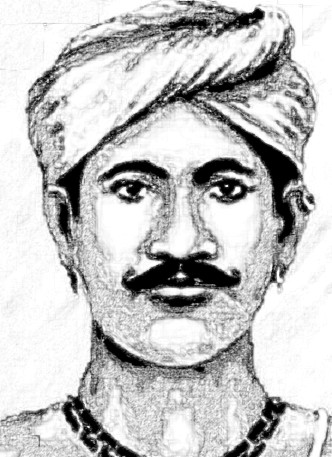
- Sketch of Madho Singh Bariha
- Born: 1786
- Died: 31 December 1858 (aged 72); Sambalpur Jail
- Cause of death: Death Sentence by Hanging
- Known for: Indian Freedom Struggle
- Movement: Sambalpur Uprising
- Children: 4
- Father: Arjun Singh Bariha

Madhab Singh Bariha or Madho Singh (Odia: ମାଧୋ ସିଂହ) was the Binjhal Zamindar (landlord) of Ghess locality of Bargarh district in Odisha and was a close associate of Veer Surendra Sai in the Sambalpur uprising against the British East India Company. He was hanged to death at the age of 72 on 31 December 1858 at Jail Chowk of Sambalpur, after being caught in the same year for his ferocious and heroic resistance to the British takeover of the region with their appalling policies. Three out of his four valiant sons were martyred while the eldest was sentenced to life imprisonment. His granddaughter Purnima committed suicide after the British hanged her rebellious husband from the Sonakhan Zamindari at Raipur.

== History ==
=== Discontent and Mobilization against the British at Ghess ===
Madho Singh considered the British as 'Bendra' (a lowborn race) due to their lack of consideration for the Indian nobility and rapid expansion on the Indian subcontinent. The British colonial authorities ignored the legitimate rights of Surendra Sai to the throne in their own favor and imprisoned him for punishing the rebellious Zamindar of Rampur within his right to authority over his land. The revenue tax demands from the British swelled up to eight times putting additional burden on the local estate rulers to pressurize their subjects for paying more taxes. The Zamindars and other chiefs beholding high sense of honor among their subjects were ordered to personally deposit the amounts at Sambalpur. Madho Singh denied to put hardship on his people to satisfy the British demands and was placed at top of a list of defaulters displayed in public. The sense of hatred against the British increased to an extreme when the Zamindar of Sonakhan Estate (Raipur), Narayan Singh and father in law of Madho Singh's granddaughter from his son Kunjel Singh was, arrested and executed at Raipur. The Sonakhan estate ruler was trying to feed his people by looting the food grains from a rich merchant who had denied helping the population suffering famine in the region. Adding to the bitterness, the British helped the cunning Zamindar of Bijepur estate to acquire the Bhatibahal region against the wishes of Madho singh.

The Ghess estate comprises roughly 25 villages under the inherited authority of Madho Singh's family collectively known as Khalsa. People from multiple local tribal and other communities like those that Kondh, Binjhal, Gond, Chauhan, etc. were recruited to participate in training for warfare and for which the expenses were provided by Madho Singh. The training sessions were confined between the full moon days of the month of Pousa until the last Tuesday of Chaitra. The Ghess estate turned into a highly charged center of nationalism and anti-British activities with strong sense of unity within the rebels. This revolutionary spirit spread to adjoining areas of Rajbodasambar, Kesaepali, Patkulunda, Bheden, Padampur and Sonakhan who also rose up after Surendra Sai called for revolt. Madho Singh and his four sons took charge of the Singora pass. The Lakhanpur estate Zamindar Balabhadra Singh Dao's son Kamal Singh Dao along with his brothers Khageswar Singh and Neelambar Singh took charge of defending Debrigarh in the Barapahar range.

=== Hostilities with the British, Capture and Execution ===
Veer Surendra Sai escaped from Hazaribagh Jail along with his aides on 30 July 1857 when the British soldiers declared mutiny there. He reached Sambalpur for forcing the British out of his territory. This development infuriated the British Assistant Commissioner R.T.Leigh who immediately sent out messages to all the local Zamindars to refrain from rebellious activities. Madho Singh who had by now openly supported the cause of freedom for his people, defied the British. He made a vow of presenting hundred and twenty enemy heads before his tutelary goddess Pataneswari and to be presented to 204 goddesses.

In December 1857 Capt. E.G. wood left Nagpur to reach Sambalpur for reinforcing the British soldiers stationed there. Madho Singh blocked his progress at the Singora pass with the rebels and killed many British soldiers. The British Captain escaped with his life and reached Sambalpur with the news of the path to Nagpur being blocked at the mountain pass by the rebels. Later he joined with R.T.Leigh in attacking the passes close to Sambalpur, which resulted in the death of Chabila Sai, a brother of Surendra Sai. A British officer named as Captain Shakespeare again attacked the pass. Hati Singh, the son of Madho Singh foiled his first attempt to gain ground but was injured in the second and had to flee due to the superior firepower of the British. Madho Singh tried to collect more weapons to face the menacing firepower and on his way to do so, he took refuge at the Paharsrigirah pass. The British officers Captain Wood Bridge, Captain Wood and Shakespeare tried to block the pass but Madho Singh caught hold of Captain Shakespeare, beheaded him during the fight and hung his headless body from the tree as a warning for the British soldiers.

Captain Wood Bridge was also killed in the fight with the rebel forces under the command of Madho Singh. Ten months later another British captain by the name Ensing Warlo marched with his men to Singora pass but was horrified to discover headless and naked corpses of the East India Company and British soldiers along with the body of captain Wood Bridge hanging from the trees at the pass. A British army Major by the name Foster burned the already abandoned empty villages of Ghess estate out of revenge. Madho Singh remained free from British capture for most of the time he held the pass. Due to ailing health at the age of 72 and after being tired spending months fighting in the forest hideouts at an old age, he needed rest and tried to move to Matiabhata village but was captured by the British forces under the command of Major Forster and hanged at the Jail Chowk in Sambalpur. By this time he had lost his son Airi Singh in the fight.

=== The Gallant Sons of Madho Singh ===
Madho Singh's youngest son Airi Singh (Uday Singh) also participated in the Indian Rebellion of 1857. Airi was in charge of the supplies to the Singora pass rebels and served as a medium of communication with Veer Surendra Sai. Some traitors from the rebel groups informed a group of British soldiers stationed at Saheba Dera about the hideout of Airi. The soldiers who reached the spot close to Singora pass did not find anyone, but while they were there the traitors identified the faithful dog of Airi that suddenly walked out of a ditch hole. Being certain of Airi being hidden in the hole, the traitors filled it with dry leaves and wood, covered it with a large stone and then put it on fire, resulting in Airi Singh suffocating to death inside his hideout. After the death of Madho Singh, his three surviving sons Hatee Singh, Kunjel Singh and Bairi Singh continued to control the mountain passes to Sambalpur. Earlier Hatee Singh had resisted the British cannon fire from Captain Shakespeare when he was fired upon by the Madras troops of the British. He lost his hearing and became senseless due to stones hitting him from the blasting off boulders, but somehow managed to escape from the spot with his followers. Hatee surrendered later due to repeated persuasion from Udanta Sai, the brother of Surendra Sai in the year 1862. The British returned him Ghess estate to send out a persuading message for his brothers along with other rebellious chiefs and to showcase an example of British generosity.

Kunjel Singh and Bairi Singh were in charge of the rebellion when a greedy Zamindar of adjacent Deori estate, with British support, threatened to take control of the Sonakhan estate of Kunjel's son in law Govinda Singh- who had just been released from Nagpur Jail. Kunjel Singh was hiding in the Khariar region with Surendra Sai at this time. On the request from his son in law, he attacked the Deori Zamindar with 120 rebels and killed him. Govinda Singh was later caught by the British and executed. On 7 March 1864 British officers Lieutenant Beril and Lieutenant Boie arrived in Badmal to arrest Kunjel but he escaped from there. Citing this as a defiance by all the brothers from Ghess nobility, they arrested all the three brothers later. Kunjel Singh and Bairi Singh were sentenced to death by hanging in Sambalpur Jail. Some believe Bairi Singh died under rigorous imprisonment and was not hanged. Hatee Singh was transported for life imprisonment to the Andaman Islands.
