= Veer Surendra Sai Museum =

Cultural museum in Odisha

- ବୀର ସୁରେନ୍ଦ୍ର ସାଇ ସଂଗ୍ରହାଳୟ
- Location in Odisha Location in India
- Established: 1904 (Original Hall); 2026 (Museum)
- Location: Dalipara, Sambalpur, Odisha 768001
- Coordinates: 21.4606°N 83.9742°E
- Owner: Government of Odisha
- Architectural style: Colonial; Neoclassical
- Budget: ₹1.44 crore
- Managed by: Sambalpur District Administration; INTACH

Veer Surendra Sai Museum (Odia:ବୀର ସୁରେନ୍ଦ୍ର ସାଇ ସଂଗ୍ରହାଳୟ; trans. Bīra Surendra Sāi Saṅgrahāḷaya), formerly known as Victoria Town Hall, is a cultural and historical museum in Sambalpur, Odisha. It was originally constructed in 1902, was renovated and inaugurated as a museum in April 2026.

== See also ==
- Veer Surendra Sai
- Colonial India
- Company rule in India
