= History of Sambalpur =

Sambalpur
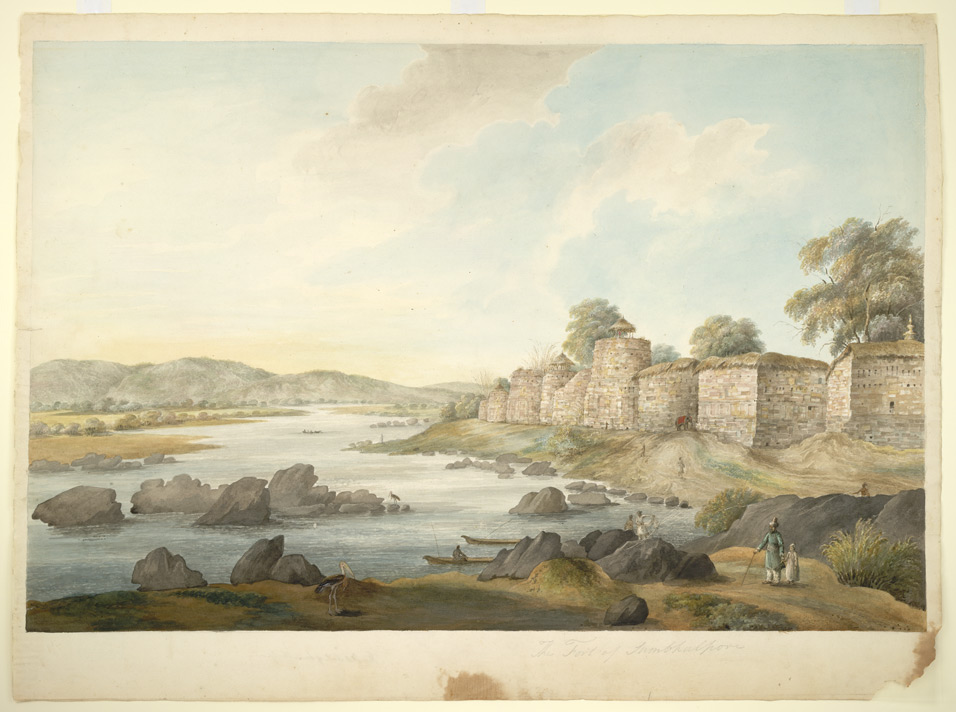
- Sambalpur in 1825, Watercolour of the fort at Sambalpur, by an anonymous artist for the Gilbert Collection, c. British Library
- Location: Odisha, India

History
- Founded: Around 5000 B.C ( mythical ) 1540 ( reestablished )

Sambalpur is a district of Odisha. Sambalpur city is the headquarter of Sambalpur district. It is named after the presiding Sambhal to Sambalpur. Sambalpur is an ancient settlement which at its earliest was a part of Dakshin Kosala. It was thus decided that it was established around 5000 BC. Sambalpur was the dwelling place of the Sabara tribes and the Hirakud was the only source of diamond in ancient times. From its establishment to its dissolution into the British Empire, it was known as the Hirakhand Kingdom probably due to its diamond mines. Sambalpur is the cultural capital of Western Odisha.

== Etymology ==
Sambalpur derives its name from that of the Goddess Samalei who is regarded as the reigning deity of the region. In history, it has also been known as 'Sambalaka'.

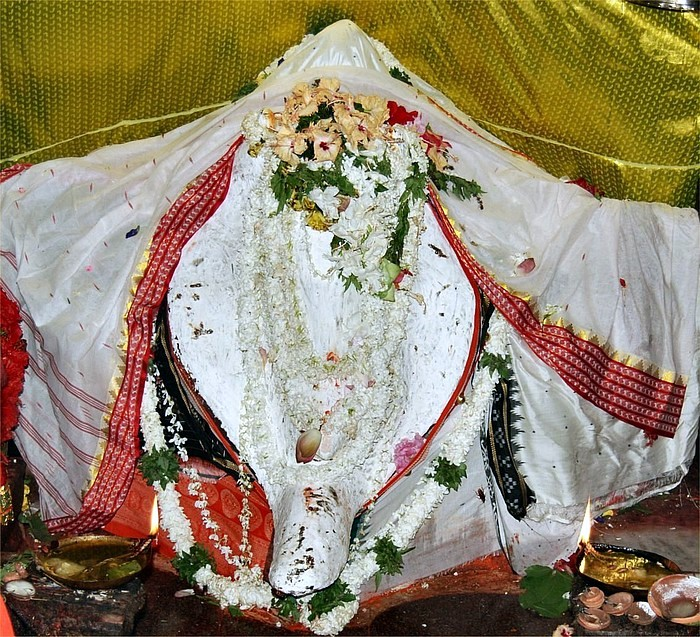
Maa Samalei, the reigning deity, after which the city of Sambalpur derives its name.

The region in which Sambalpur city is located was also known as Hirakhanda from ancient times. Ptolemy has described the place as "Sambalak". According to Tavernir, the French traveller, and Edward Gibbon, the English historian, diamonds were exported to Rome from Sambalpur.

== History ==
Sambalpur/ Sambal desh

The history of Sambalpur, as depicted by eminent historians, is full of events including Indian freedom struggle representing the different sections of society. Since Sambalpur is one of the ancient district of India, which survived even in the prehistoric age, much of the historical records about the origin and the existence of Sambalpur in the political scenario of Odisha are still in obscurity.

Sambalpur is mentioned in the book of Ptolemy (Claudius Ptolemaeus) as Sambalaka on the left bank of river "Manada", now known as Mahanadi, other evidence are available from the records of Xuanzang, and in the writings of the celebrated King Indrabhuti of Sambalaka of Odra Desha or Oddiyan (oldest known king of Sambalpur), the founder of Vajrayana Buddhism. He has written the book Jñānasiddhi. Simhadeba (1987: p. 317) affirms that the first record of Jagannatha in literature is by the Mahasiddha Indrabhuti, the Vajrayanaadept of Buddhadharma, in his famed work, the Jnana Siddhi (Sanskrit: ज्ञानसिद्धिर्नामसाधनम्; IAST: jñānasiddhirnāmasādhanam; Tibetan: ཡེ་ཤེས་གྲུབ་པ་ཞེས་བྱ་བའི་སྒྲུབ་པའི་ཐབས, Wylie: ye shes grub pa zhes bya ba'i sgrub pa'i thabs which is T2219 of the Tibetan Tengyur):

"N. K. Sahu emphasises Indrabhuti, the Raja of Sambhal (Sambalpur), who has been assigned to have ruled during the dark period of the history of western Odisha by the author to have been the propounder of Vajrayana Buddhism. He was the first Siddha to identify Buddha with Jagannath and he was the worshipper of Jagannatha whom he prays at several places of his famous work Jnana Siddhi. Before Indrabhuti there was no conception of Jagannath as a God to be worshipped.

=== Indrabhuti installed Jagannath deity ===
Moreover, Simhadeba (1987: p. 317) outlines that an installation of a Jagannath murti in a cave in Court Samalai hill Sonepur according to local folk tradition was done by Indrabhuti but the site requires archaeological investigation:

"Puri (Purushottama Puri) is the seat of Purushottama and not of Jagannath. In the 10th century A.D. a religious revolution synthesised Jagannath of Sambalpur with Purushottama of Puri. It may be said that an important cave in the Court Samalai hill near Sonepur is attributed by the local people as the earliest seat of the worship of Lord Jagannath. It appears that Jagannath of Raja Indrabhuti was installed in that cave giving rise to the tradition, which is current even in the present day. The Court Samalai hill required proper archaeological survey for coming to a definite conclusion."

French merchant Jean Baptiste Tavernier (1605–1689) in his travel account "Six Voyages en Turquie, en Perse et aux Indes (1676–77)" translated into English by Valentine Ball as "Travels in India" (2d ed., 2 vol., 1925) wrote about the numerous famous diamond mines of Sumelpur (Semelpur), the present day Sambalpur. He states that, 8,000 people were at work in these mines at the time of his visit, in the dry season at the beginning of February.

=== The Sambalpur State and beginning of British rule ===
In 1540 A.D., the kingdom of Patna, ruled by the Chauhan Rajput dynasty was bifurcated. The southern portion of the Ang river was ruled by Narasingh Deb and his brother Balaram Deb received the northern side of the river, known as kingdom of Huma. He then started marching towards the north-east direction of Patnagarh. He first established his capital in Nuagarh (present-day near Bargarh). He faced some resistance by the old settlers of Bargarh, namely two brothers Barna and Rajiar of Bhaina-Pada. Balram Deo defeated them and established a big fort (in Odia it is Bada-Garh, hence present day Bargarh). Later Balaram Deo proceeded further north and established his new capital at Sambalpur. His descendants expanded the kingdom gradually through cultural, military and administrative expansion. They claimed the title of Raja of Sambalpur. During the reign of Baliar Singh, many brahmins from puri migrated to Sambalpur and began the festival of Sital Sasthi. In the reign of Ajit Singh, significant political instability destroyed the future of the state. The Diwan of Sambalpur Dakhin Ray, then Piloo Ray and then Akbar Rai successively began controlling power and were assassinated one after other. It also flared up conflict with the Marathas. Sambalpur was ruled by the Chauhan dynasty till the 1800s when Maharaj Sai, the last king died heirless.

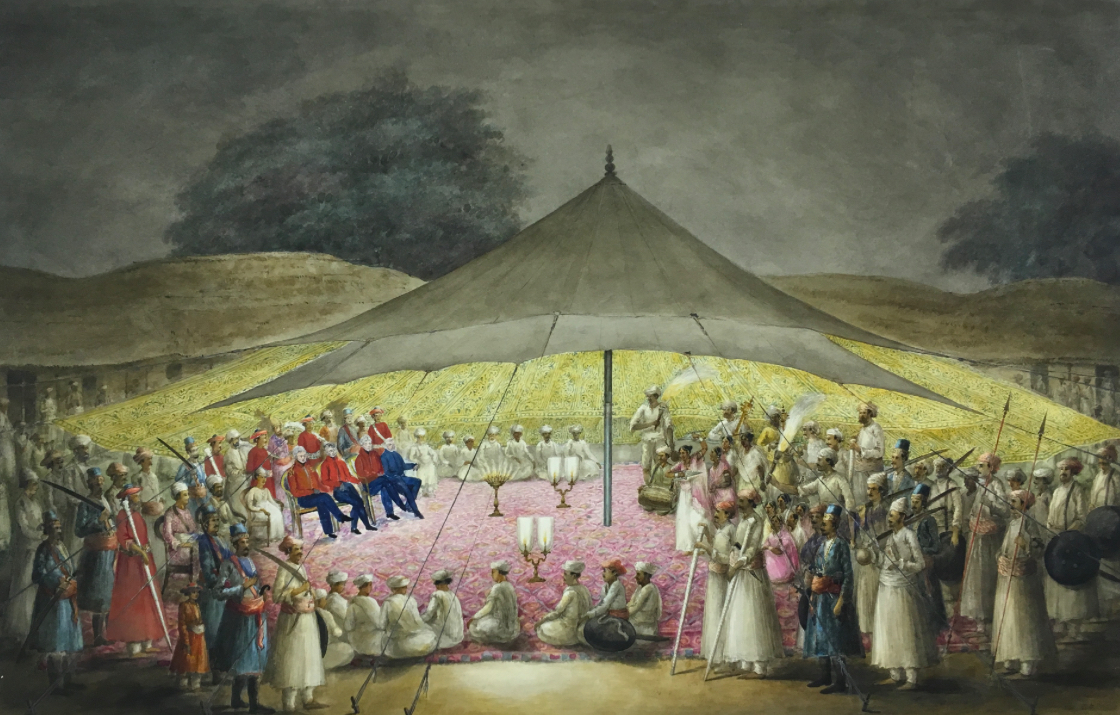
The Raja of Sambalpur entertaining Britain officials with a nautch

The kingdom struggled under many pretenders to the throne such as Veer Surendra Sai, Narayan Singh, and the widow queen. Narayan Singh was installed as the King and met with opposition. After he had no sons due to male primogeniture, the kingdom lapsed to the British. The kingdom of Sambalpur was also known as Hirakhand and Sambalpur was its capital.

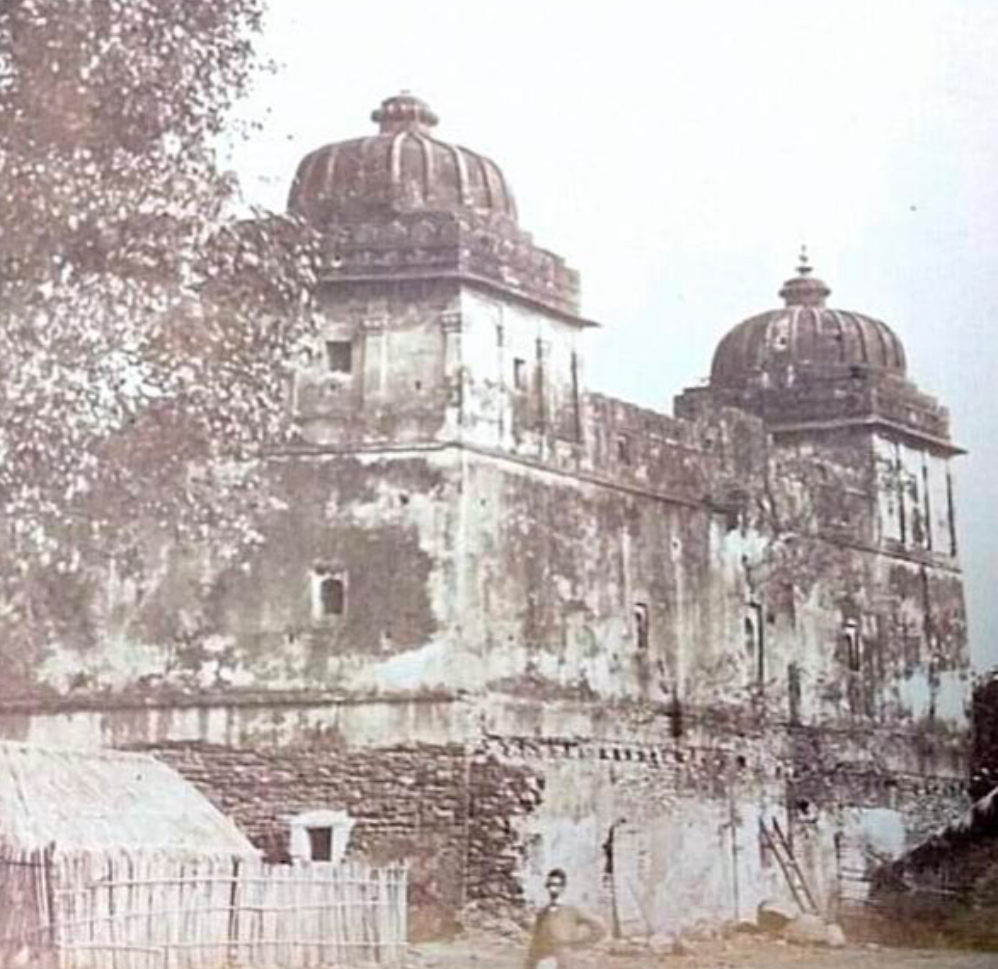
An old photograph of Jemadei Mahal built by the Chauhans

Sambalpur came under the Bhonsles of Nagpur when the Marathas conquered Sambalpur in 1800. After the Third Anglo-Maratha War in 1817, the British Government returned Sambalpur to the Chauhan king, Jayant Singh but his authority over the other princely states were taken out.

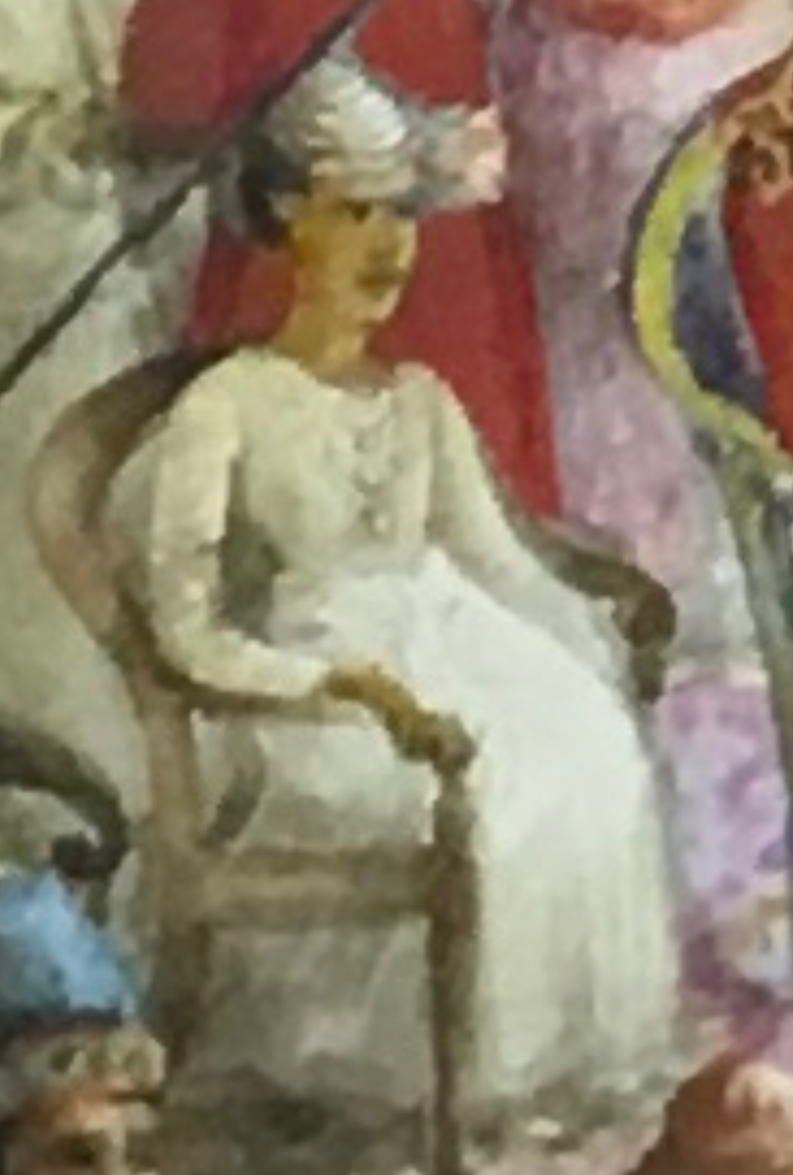
Maharaj Sai, the Raja of Sambalpur in a public durbar with British officials

1825 to 1827, Lieutenant Colonel Gilbert (1785–1853), later Lieutenant General Sir Walter Raleigh Gilbert, first baronet, G.C.B., was the Political Agent for the South West Frontier with headquarters at Sambalpur. He made few paintings during his stay at Sambalpur by an unknown artist which are currently with the British Library and Victoria and Albert Museum.

=== Sambalpur uprising ===
Maharaj Sai, the only son and heir to the throne of Sambalpur died without any heir thus political tensions arose in Sambalpur. The Queen of Sambalpur was debarred from adopting Surendra Sai and the British instead crowned Narayan Singh as king. When Narayan Singh, died in 1849 without a direct male heir, the British seized the state under the policy of doctrine of lapse. Sambalpur was kept under the South-West Frontier Agency with headquarters at Ranchi. The official language of this region at that time was Hindi. "South-West Frontier Agency" was renamed "Chhota Nagpur Division" in 1854.

The name of Veer Surendra Sai, who fought against the British Rule, is recorded in golden letters in the history of India's struggle for independence. During the Sepoy Mutiny in July 1857 the mutineers broke open the prison at Hazaribagh, where Surendra Sai was imprisoned and released all the prisoners. Surendra Sai fought against the British after reaching Sambalpur. There was no mutiny in Cuttack division, so Sambalpur was transferred to Cuttack division in 1858 and Oriya was made the official language of Sambalpur. Sambalpur along with other princely states of Western Odisha was included in the newly created Chhattisgarh division of Central Province in 1862.

=== Language issues ===
In January 1896, Hindi was made official language of Sambalpur. The people of Sambalpur, for whom Hindi was an alien language and their mother tongue is primarily a dialect of Odia, called Sambalpuri, objected it. Odia was re-introduced as the official language of Sambalpur district in 1903 as they demanded amalgamation with Odisha Division as a solution of the language crisis. This suited Lord Curzon, Sir Andrew Fraser and Mr. Risley, who were bent upon dividing Bengal on the basis of religion, so that British rule could continue in India. So the demand of amalgamation was accepted by the British Government during the partition of Bengal in 1905 when Sambalpur and the adjacent Sambalpuri speaking tracts were amalgamated with the Odisha Division under Bengal Presidency. Bengal's Odisha division became part of the new province of Bihar and Odisha in 1912, and in April 1936 became the separate province of Odisha. After Indian Independence on 15 August 1947, Odisha became an Indian state. The rulers of the Princely states of Western Odisha acceded to the Government of India in January 1948 and became part of Odisha state.

=== Twentieth Century ===
1956: Hirakud Dam was built across the Mahanadi River at Hirakud and VSSUT started functioning as University College of Engineering, Burla under Utkal University.

1966: Sambalpur University Act was passed.

1967 Sambalpur university located at Burla started functioning.

=== Vajrayana Buddhism ===
Although it is generally accepted that Tantric Buddhism first developed in the country of Uddiyana or Odra Desha under King Indrabhuti, there is an old and well known scholarly dispute as to whether Uddiyana or Odra was in the Swat valley, Odisha or some other place.

Indrabhuti, the oldest known king of Sambalpur founded Vajrayana while his sister who was married to Yuvaraja Jalendra of Lankapuri (Suvarnapur) founded Sahajayana. These new Tantric sects of Buddhism introduced Mantra, Mudra and Mandala along with six Tantric Abhicharas (practices) such as Marana, Stambhana, Sammohana, Vidvesan, Uchchatana and Vajikarana. The Tantric Buddhist sects made efforts to raise the dignity of the lowest of the low of the society to a higher plane. It revived primitive beliefs and practices a simpler and less formal approach to the personal god, a liberal and respectful attitude towards women and denial of caste system.

From the seventh century A.D. onwards many popular religious elements of heterogeneous nature were incorporated into Mahayana Buddhism which finally resulted in the origin of Vajrayana, Kalachakrayana and Sahajayana Tantric Buddhism. Tantric Buddhism first developed in Uddiyana, a country which was divided into two kingdoms Sambhala and Lankapuri. Sambhala has been identified with Sambalpur and Lankapuri with Subarnapura (Sonepur).

Many celebrated Vajrayana Acharyas like Sarah, Hadipa, Dombi, Heruka, Tantipa and Luipa came from the so-called despised classes. The sect exerted a tremendous influence over the tribal and despised classes of people of Sambalpur and Bolangir region. It was in the 9th/10th century A.D. that there appeared seven famous Tantric maidens at Patna (Patnagarh) region which was then called Kuanri-Patana. These maidens are popularly known as Saat Bhauni (Seven sisters), namely, Gyanadei Maluni, Luhakuti, Luhuruni, Nitei Dhobani, Sukuti Chamaruni, Patrapindhi Savaruni, Gangi Gauduni and sua Teluni. They hailed from so-called the low castes of the society and were followers of Lakshminkara. Because of their miraculous power and feats; they have been later on deified and worshipped by the folk people.

A systematic analysis of the trend of religious development of the period under review and circumstantial evidences reveal that Chakra Sambar Tantricism of Tantric Buddhism gained popularity in the Gandhagiri region. The chief deity of Chakra Sambara Tantra is Buddha Sambara, the deity whose worship is still popular in China and Tibet. According to Sadhanamala, god Buddha Sambara is one-faced and two-armed. He appears terrible with his garment of tiger-skin, garland of heads, a string of skulls round the head, three eyes and in Âlidhamudrâ, he tramples upon Kalaratri. A number of texts relating to the procedures of worship of God Buddha Sambara have been composed by siddhacharyas like Darikapa, Santideva, Jayadratha and others. King Indrabhuti of Shambala (Sambalpur) composed Chakra Sambara Stotra, Chakra Sambara Anubandha Samgraha, Chakra Sambara Tantraraga Sambara Samuchchaya Nama Brutti etc. The philosopher cum king Indrabhuti became the source inspiration to the adherents of Tantric Buddhist sect in Kosal including Gandhagiri region.

Indrabhuti and Laksminkara, the two royal Buddhist Acharyas created a mass of followers to their sects. In the 9th–10th century A.D. the worship and sadhana of Buddha Sambara, the presiding deity of Chakra Sambara Tantra gained popularity in the Gandhagiri region. In Gandhagiri which also contained a large number of caves and rock shelters, apparently of the Vajrayanists and Sahajayanists, the adherents of the sects used to live in seclusion and practice Kaya Sadhana or Yogic practices along with worshipping god Buddha Sambara.

This tantric Buddhist culture greatly affected the religious faith and beliefs of the tribal of Gandhagiri, so much so that eventually even today one can notice the invocation of various Buddhist Siddhacharyas and Buddhist deities in the mantras of the tribal to ward off evil spirits or cure some disease. Buddha was worshipped by many tribal in the name of Budharaja. There is also a small hillock at the heart of present-day Sambalpur by the name Budharaja.

==== Kalki & Shambhala ====
Kalachakra tantra was first taught by the Buddha to King Indrabhuti, the first dharmaraja of Shambhala.

"Lord Kalki will appear in the home of the most eminent brahmin of Shambhala village, the great souls Vishnuyasha and Sumati." (Srimad-Bhagavatam Bhag.12.2.18)

== See also ==
- Timeline of Sambalpur
