= Kavyanjali (poetry collection) =

2016 collection of poems by Haldhar Nag

- Cover of Vol. 1
- Author: Haldhar Nag
- Translator: Surendra Nath
- Language: English
- Release number: 5
- Genre: Poetry, epic poem, biography
- Publisher: (India) Zenith Star
- Publication date: 2 October 2016
- Publication place: India
- Media type: Paperback, e-book

Kavyanjali (Note: This is the transliteration of the Sanskrit "काव्यांजलि", which literally means "dedication of poetry". It is also used as a female name in India.) is collection of English poems by the Indian Kosali poet Haldhar Nag, translated by Surendra Nath. The book was first published in 2016 with a foreword written by Odia writer Manoj Das. The poems cover various themes such as spiritualism, social reality, cultural identity, etc. As of 2022, a total of 5 volumes of Kavyanjali have been published; the Vol. 3 and Vol. 4 are not collections of poems, but are epic poems and biographies respectively.

== Contents ==
=== Vol. 1 ===
The first volume (ISBN 9781696148337) was released in Bhubaneswar on 2 October 2016. It has a total of 268 pages and contains 24 poems. Nag's debut poem "Old Banyan Tree" is also included:

1. Five Nectars of Immortality
2. The Great Sati Urmila
3. Old Banyan Tree
4. Make No Silly Excuses
5. Demon
6. The Minister and the Beggar
7. A Cubit Taller
8. Wine
9. River Ghensali
10. The Cuckoo
11. Bulbul
12. What Else Could Have Happened
13. The Harlot of Tikarpada
14. The Soul is Real
15. First Clean Yourself
16. Bhai Jiuntia (Note: A traditional festival in western Odisha, held every September to October.)
17. Greatness
18. The Year
19. Too Much
20. The Dove is My Teacher
21. Light of the Earthen Lamp
22. Conscience
23. Why Did He Leave His Home
24. A Letter to Poet Haldhar

=== Vol. 2 ===
The second volume (ISBN 9781695954281) was released in Sambalpur on 10 October 2018, with a total of 244 pages, including 28 short poems and 2 long poems:

1. Lies Lead to Hell
2. Shri Samlei (Note: Samaleswari, the goddess believed in in Western Odisha.)
3. Our Village Cremation Ground
4. Profit
5. For a Little Broth of Rice
6. Kunjel Para
7. The Morning of March
8. Danseuse
9. Market of Illusion
10. Kamdhenu
11. Just Think of It
12. The Jealous Always Suffer
13. On the Death of Budhadev Das Cries Mother Samlei
14. Animals and Humans
15. Warning
16. Swachh Bharat
17. Butterfly
18. Smeared with Colours, The Old Man Was Cremated
19. The Matter Ends Here
20. The Younger Brother's Courage
21. A Song in Sanchar Tune
22. Regard for Soil
23. Untouchable
24. Lantern
25. Fire
26. Summer
27. Rains
28. God Kalia of Priest Luru
29. Slumber
30. Chhanda Charan Avtar

=== Vol. 3 ===
The third volume (ISBN 9781701787070) was released in Bargarh on 22 November 2019 and has a total of 400 pages. Its content is different from the poetry anthologies in the first two volumes. It is an epic poem with a total of 21 chapters and 1,340 verses, titled "Manifestation of Love"; the illustrations in the book are by Rhiti Chatterjee Bose, the female illustrator from Kolkata. The author tells the story of Krishna from birth to death in a new light:

1. Kamsa and Devaki
2. Balram is Born in Gopa-pur
3. Kamsa and Pootana. Incarnation of Krishna
4. The Prison Guard
5. Crossing of Yamuna
6. Nature Blooms in Gopa-pur
7. Mother Pootana
8. Twin Trees Yamla-Arjun
9. Yashoda’s Vision of the Universe
10. Balram is Named Haldhar
11. Mohan Flute
12. Rasleela
13. Akrur Fetches Krishna, Balram
14. Mathura
15. Death of Kamsa
16. Disrobing of Draupadi
17. Karna the Charitable
18. Shyamantak
19. Sudama
20. Radhe-Krishna
21. The End of Dwapar Yuga

=== Vol. 4 ===
The fourth volume (ISBN 9798696248189) was released on 11 October 2020, with a total of 368 pages. It is the biographical story of revolutionary Surendra Sai, poet Bhima Bhoi and Gangadhar Meher.

=== Vol. 5 ===
The fifth volume (ISBN 9798792985353) was released on 30 December 2021, with a total of 304 pages and contains 31 poems:

1. Tulsi Das
2. River and Ocean
3. Mahua Tree
4. Neem Tree
5. Spring Tune
6. Shivaratri
7. Bracelet
8. The Witch They Slapped with Slippers
9. What Do We Do
10. Goat
11. That Village Kuchipali
12. Dussehra Festival in Ghess
13. Attire
14. Tara Mandodari
15. Only Because You Exist
16. Victory Song
17. The Power of Goddess
18. Kirtan
19. Arrived Dussehra
20. Squirrel
21. The Little Calf
22. Five Orphans
23. Wooden Leg
24. Nuakhai Festival Meet
25. Pushpuni (Note: a Odisha festival)
26. Give Me Some Medicine
27. Forest Jasmine
28. Blessings of Guru
29. The Disrobing
30. Juapuni
31. The Village Chowkidar

== Origin ==
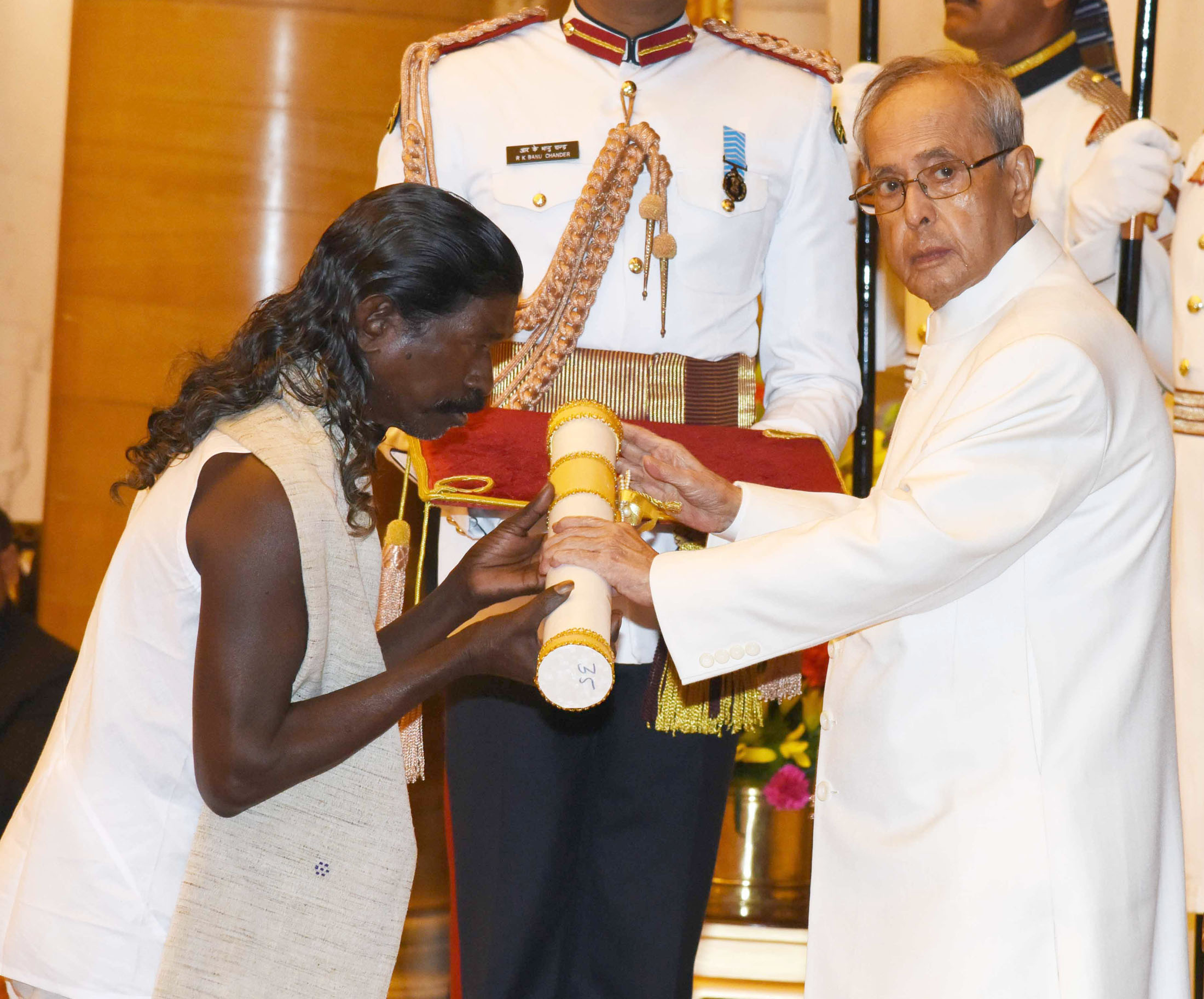
Haldhar Nag was awarded the Padma Shri in New Delhi wearing a vest, taken on 28 March 2016.

The translator, Surendra Nath, is a retired naval officer. In early 2016, he happened to see a post that went viral on social media: a dark-skinned man with long hair, wearing a vest and dhoti, and barefoot, receiving the Padma Shri from Pranab Mukherjee, the President of India. Therefore, he became curious about this "The vest poet" and began to pay attention to his works. Understanding that language was a barrier between Haldhar Nag's rich literary work and the rest of the world, Nath decided to translate Nag's poetry into English so that a wider audience could read it.

In addition, Nath also embarked on an autonomous project called "Project Kavyanjali", to translate and publish all the works of Haldhar Nag into English.
