= Balarama Deva =

- Reign: 1570 - 1595 CE
- Predecessor: Hiradhara Deva of Patna State
- Successor: Hrudayanarayan Deva
- Spouse: Kamala Kumari (Princess of Gangpur State) and Princess of Surguja
- House: Chauhans of Sambalpur
- Religion: Hinduism

Balarama Deva or Balaram Deo was the first Chauhan ruler of Sambalpur State and the tenth in line ruler of the Chauhan dynasty in the Western Odisha region during the sixteenth century. He was a powerful ruler and an excellent military strategist who ruled the hilly and forest tracts of western Odisha that was mostly inhabited by different tribal or aboriginal communities. After his ascension to the throne in the year 1570 CE, he secured the region from the neighboring Ratanpur's Haihayas and build a strong state surpassing the glory of his ancestral Chauhan state of Patna (Bolangir). Balarama Deva had also provided military assistance to the Gajapati king Ramachandra Deva of Khurda Kingdom and help to defend Khurda kingdom from the invading Muslim armies who either belonged to the Mughal Dynasty or the Golconda Sultanate. After consolidation of his authority over the regions of western Odisha and now parts of the state of Chattishgarh, Balarama Deva himself installed the idol of Goddess Samleswari as the head family deity which began the era of cultural rejuvenation in the region.

== Initial Days in the Service of the Patna State ==
After the death of the last hegemonic Gajapati Mukunda Deva in the Gohiratikri battlefield in 1568 AD, the Afghans and Mughals subsequently struggled for authority and an era of chaos had ensued. During the last quarter of the sixteenth century, Odisha was undergoing several political disturbances leading to the subsequent collapse of the central authority. The authority of the Gajapati kings of Odisha was starting to lose its imperial status and the glorious title of 'Gajapati' had begun to get limited to the rulers of a very small region of today's Khurda, Puri, Nayagarh and Cuttack districts of coastal Odisha. Though Gajapati Kings lost their sovereignty, they remain the tutelary head and Odisha princely states and ancient Zamindaris establishes and flourished under Gajapati era. During the rule of Gajapati Ramachandra Deva of Khurda, the forces of the Afghans of Bengal invaded again and again while the Mughals closely contested them for control of the region through repeated clashes. As described in the Kosalananda Kavya, Balarama Deva was sent with a force of 32,000 infantry, 700 cavalry and 30 war elephants to assist the Gajapati king by his father Hiradhara Deva. Balarama Deva was instrumental in asserting the Independence of the Chauhan rule in the Patna state during this period. He also defeated the king of neighboring Bastar region who tried to take over the regions of western Odisha.

== Foundation and Integration of the new Sambalpur State ==
=== Folklore on Partition of the Chauhan Territory ===
There are two different existing folklore which describes how Balarama Deva got to rule the northern part their ancestral kingdom around today's Sambalpur while his brother Narasimha Deva continued the rule from Patna. The first folklore speaks of Balarama Deva crossing the river Mayavati in the dark night to bring a nurse so that she could help his pregnant sister in law and the wife of Narasimha Deva who had gone to labor. His elder brother being very thankful gave him the northern part of his territory to rule. The second folklore narrates that there was an existing strife between the two brothers for accession to the throne when their mother intervened. She led both of them to a village called Kalapathar on the banks of river Ong and asked Narasimha to stand on the right bank of the river while Balarama was asked to stand on the left bank. She declared that the river would mark their boundary any attempt against it will be considered as a crime against her. In another case, the poem Jaya Chandrika written by Prahallad Dubey, the court poet of Sarangarh kingdom in the 18th Century, states that, Balarama Deva was fond of hunting and to fulfill his wishes he asked his mother for the region of Sambalpur which was situated on the bank of river Mahanadi and known for the diamond mines.

=== Partition Due to Kalachuri Haihaya Threat ===
The neighboring Haihaya ruler Kalyan Sahai had declared himself as the overlord of forty eight princely states and forts which included large parts of western Odisha along with Patna. Due to the threat of conquest from the enemy and effective decentralized administration of the Chauhan kingdom, Balarama Deva was asked to practice his authority and guardianship separately in the northern areas by his ruling brother Narasimha Deva. The Haihaya threat never materialized once Balarama Deva effectively practiced his rule on the region. Eventually after the death of Narasimha Deva, the Patna state became unimportant due to the growing effectiveness of the newly founded Sambalpur state by Balarama Deva. The poem Jaya Chandrika describes the kingdom as Huma Desha where the river Jira flowed and the center of power was located at Bargarh. Eventually to strengthen his defensive position, Balarama shifted his capital first to Chaunrpur and then to Sambalpur on the banks of river Mahanadi.

=== Military Conquests in the Region and Control Over Patna ===
Balarama deva dealt first with the Ratanpur Haihaya threat by defeating the reigning king Lakshman Sahai after the death of Kalyan Sahai and conquered the neighboring regions of Raigarh, Sakti, Sarangarh and parts of Bargarh. The states of Surguja and Gangpur became feudatory states of Sambalpur. The Ganga kingdom of Bamanda also became a vassal state after it was conquered and Rama Chandra Deva was appointed as feudal king under the authority of Sambalpur. During his conquests, the Gangpur ruler gave away his daughter Kamala Kumari in marriage to Balarama Deva and also he subsequently married another self ruling princess of Surguja when the kingdom was defeated by him. During Balarama Deva the new state was secured with eighteen forts also popularly known as Atharagarh and one of the main fort itself was the Bargarh fort which was initially built or restored by Balarama Deva as center of his power. There were also thirteen divisions in his new state.

After the death of his brother Narasimha Deva and again the death of the new successor Hamira Deva in a short span of three years, Balarama Deva sent his son Hridayanarayana Deva to rule the parent state of Patna. However, the widowed queen and the ministers complained against his rule. When the matters were investigated it was found that the corrupt ministers had created trouble in the practicing of effective authority by Hridayanarayana. Enraged by this event, Balarama expelled the ministers and the queen mother who later took shelter in the southern areas Nandpur.

== Cultural Contribution and Historical Impact ==
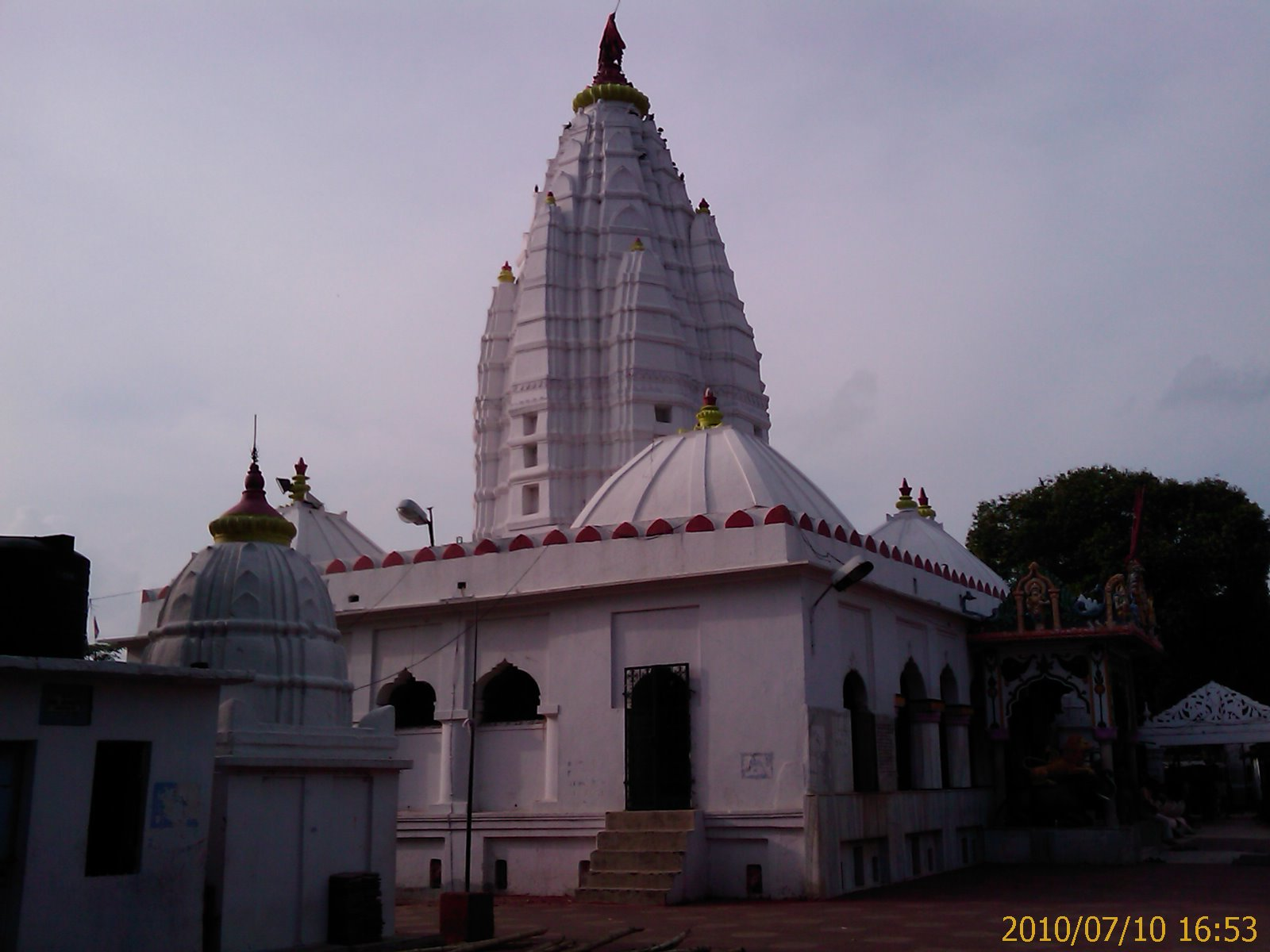
Samaleswari temple that was originally built by Balarama Deva after installing the deity under a Simuli tree and later his descendant Chhatra Sai Deo rebuild the sanctum to its present form after a century.

Balarama Deva had undertaken certain significant constructional and cultural restoration initiatives in his new kingdom. The foremost and the highly important step during his rule was to establish goddess Samleswari as the head deity of his state. Samleswari was adored by the local tribal population before in the region and their allegiance was won for himself due to this. It is also believed that the harvest festival of Nuakhai dedicated to goddess Samleswari, widely celebrated across western Odisha and neighboring regions was initiated by him. After defeating Surguja, he brought back an idol of Ananta Saya as trophy for his victory and build a temple at Sambalpur for the deity. At the height of his power the newly founded kingdom at Sambalpur extended from the river Mahanadi in the north to the river Ong in the south and from the Surangi in Phuljhar in the west to Huma on the Mahanadi in the east. He employed the Johoras for the collecting diamonds from the river bed of Mahanadi and granted them the villages of Hirakud and Junani. He granted lands to Brahmins and rebuilt or renovated the Huma temple. A temple for goddess Patneswari was built at Sambalpur during his rule.

Despite the collapse of central authority and disintegration of Odisha in the sixteenth century caused by successive invasions and betrayal within the bureaucracy, Balarama Deva was able to secure and expand the parts of his kingdom. He ensured stability, security, law and order over his new kingdom by bringing together all his subjects. Balarama Deva is described in the poem Jaya Chandrika as the Garh Sambhari Chauhan King.
