= Dhado Bargachh =

Poem by Haldar Nag

Dhado Bargachh (Old Banyan Tree)
- by Haldhar Nag
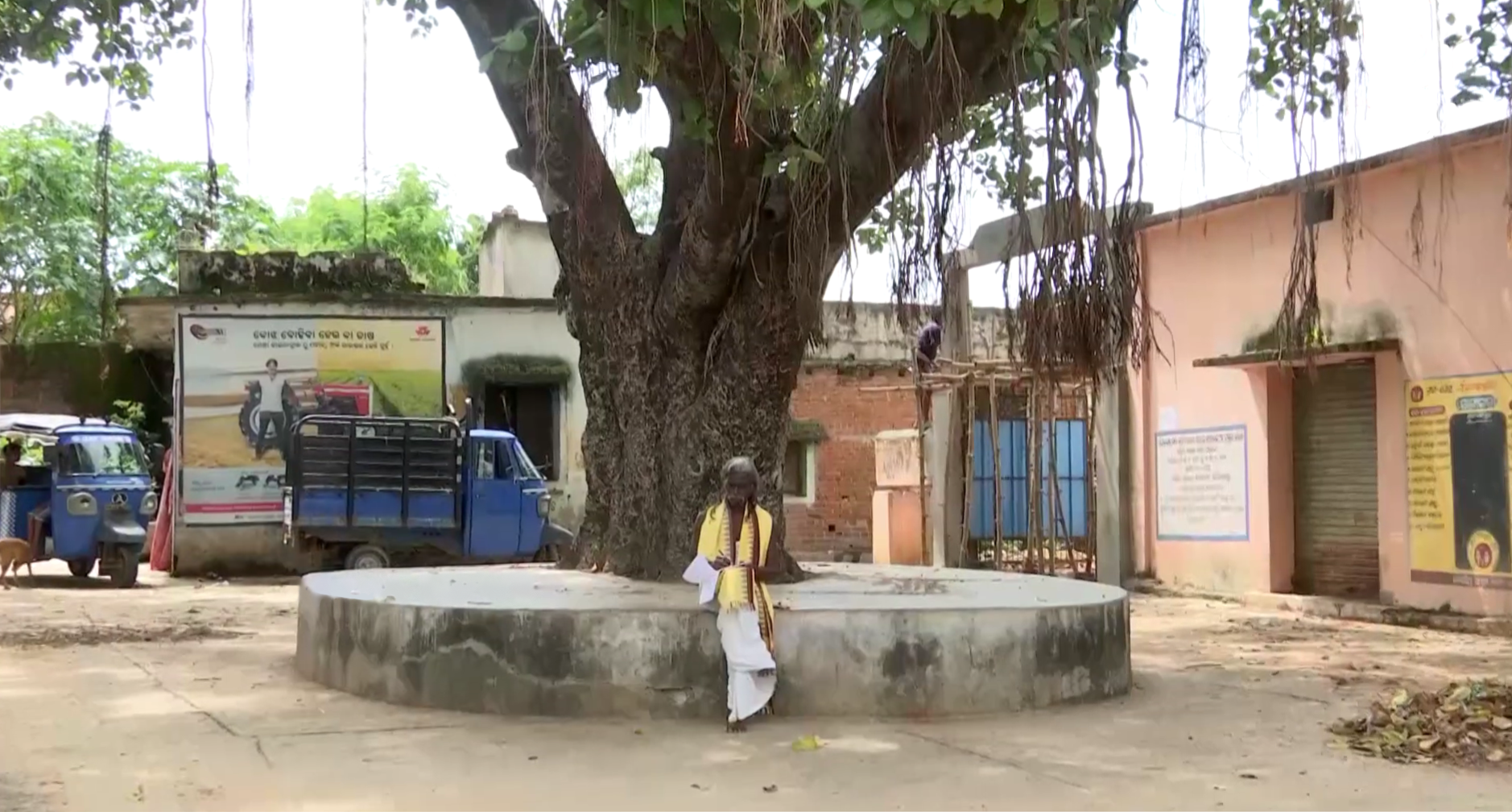
- Haldhar Nag writing poem under the banyan tree in Ghess, this tree is the prototype of poetry creation.
- Written: 1990
- Language: Sambalpuri
- Lines: 40

Dhado Bargachh or Dhodo Bargachh is a poem written by Indian poet Haldhar Nag in 1990, with a total of 10 paragraphs. The author personifies the banyan tree in the poem and describes what the banyan tree has witnessed in the past, reflecting the portrayal of life in rural India.

The poem was originally published in a local magazine and is Haldhar Nag's debut work. It was later translated into English by Surendra Nath as Old Banyan Tree, which is included in the Kavyanjali Vol.1 and in the Haldhar Nag Selected Poems.

== Background ==
The theme of Dhado Bargachh comes from a banyan tree in Ghess by the author Haldhar Nag, which existed in his grandfather's time. In this poem, the banyan tree is seen as a swing for children at the roots, a shelter for travelers, a resting place for the groom to pick up and drop off his bride, and a place for the dead to die. In the last stanza of Dhado Bargachh, the author personifies the banyan tree as a silent witness: "It sees, it knows, it hears, it finds, but it speaks not a word. It stands like a mute witness, with its strong arms spread outward."

In 1990, Nag wrote Dhado Bargachh to great success, and wrote four other poems in a row, all of which were published. After the beginning of his career as a poet, he visited nearby villages and asked the villagers to recite his poems. Soon it was given the reputation of "Lok Kabi Ratna" (Odia: ଲୋକକବିରତ୍ନ, lit. 'folk poet gem').
