= Padmashree Haldhar Nag Kavi Kutir =

Padmashree Haldhar Nag Sadhana Kutir and Sangrahalaya
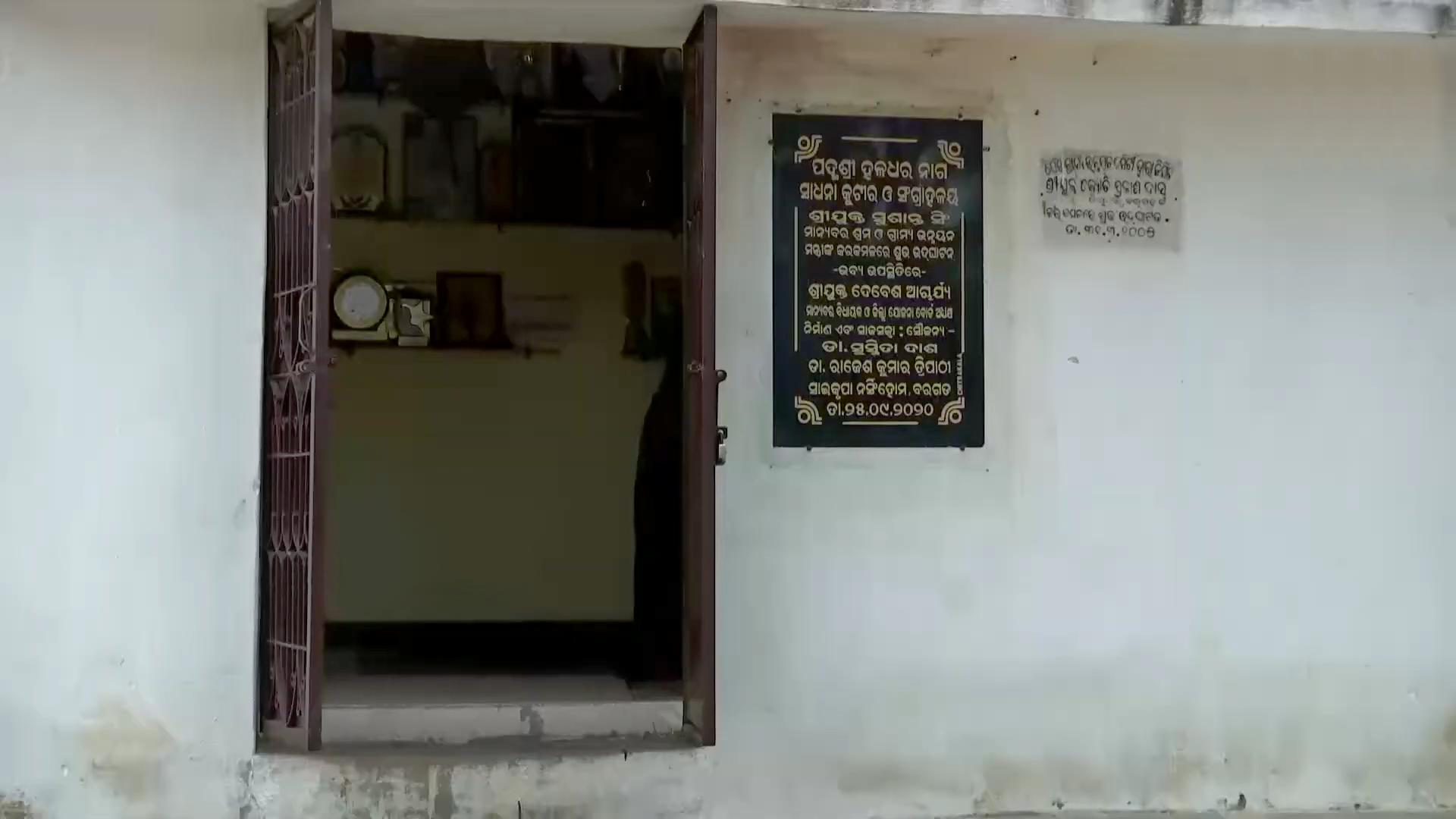

- Location within Odisha
- Former names: Haldhar Sadhana Kutir, Ghess
- Alternative names: Haldhar Nag Kutir; Haldhar Kutir

General information
- Type: House
- Location: Ghess, Bargarh district, Odisha, India
- Coordinates: 21.1896949°N 83.2843545°E
- Renovated: September 25, 2020
- Owner: Haldhar Nag

Technical details
- Floor count: 1

Padmashree Haldhar Nag Sadhana Kutir and Sangrahalaya (Note: "Padmashree" is the Padma Shri awarded to Haldhar Nag, is not a part of his name.) or Padmashree Haldhar Nag Kavi Kutir, formerly known as Haldhar Sadhana Kutir, Ghess, is the residence of the Indian "The Vest Poet" Haldhar Nag, in Ghess village, Bargarh district, Odisha, India.

Haldhar Nag Kutir is a single-storey building. It mainly displays all the awards Haldhar Nag has won, as well as portraits given to him by readers.

== History ==
The appearance of Haldhar Nag Kutir before renovation.

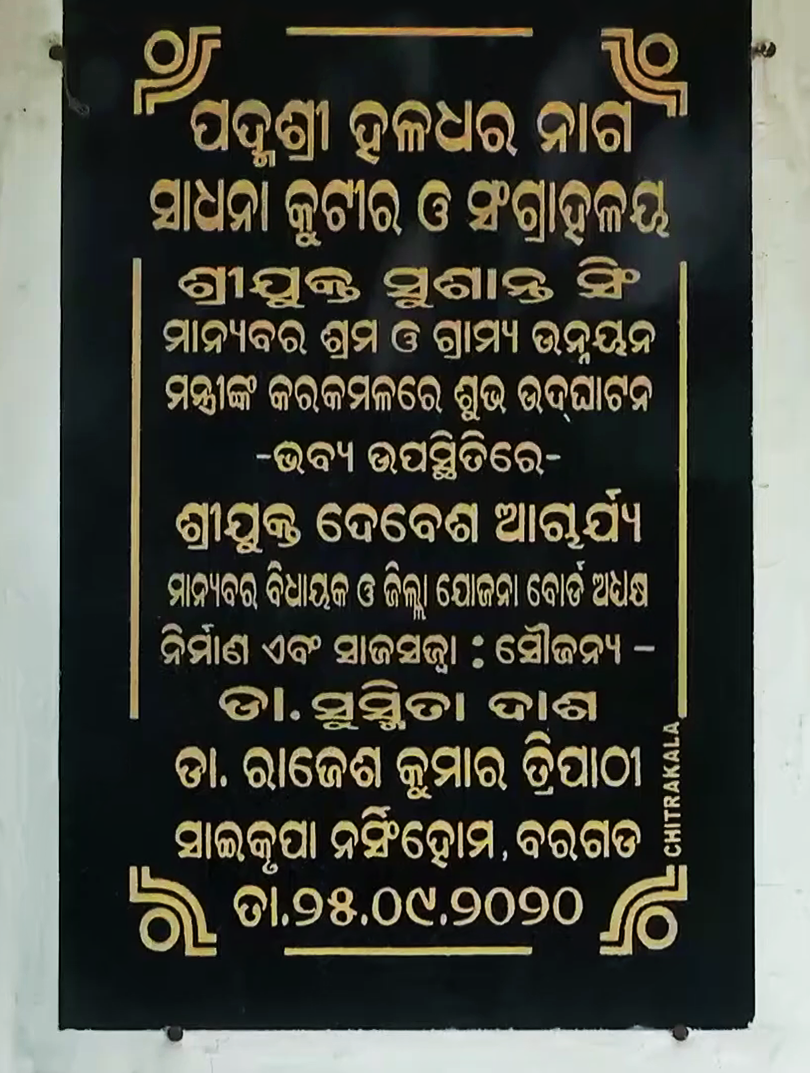
Record of the renovation of Haldhar Nag Kutir

The construction date of Padmashree Haldhar Nag Kavi Kutir is unknown. It was originally a kiosk built by Nag in his early years to sell stationery and snacks to nearby students.

Before the renovation, Haldhar Nag Kutir was dilapidated and dimly lit; the roof is made of iron sheets, and the walls were paved with discarded Coke cans, and there are no toilet and other facilities. Haldhar Nag's manuscripts and poetry collections had no cupboards to store them, so they were piled in cardboard boxes and gunny sacks and placed under the bed, causing them to be damp due to improper preservation.

In 2019 Susmita Dash and Rajesh Tripathy, a doctor couple from Bargarh, decided to renovate Haldhar Nag Kutir, and turn it into a gallery with Haldhar Nag's approval. The renovated Haldhar Nag Kutir displays all his awards and memorabilia. On September 25 of the following year, the renovation of the Haldhar Nag Kutir was completed and it was inaugurated by politicians Susanta Singh and Debesh Acharya, as the chief guests.

== Gallery ==
Appearance of Padmashree Haldhar Nag Kavi Kutir

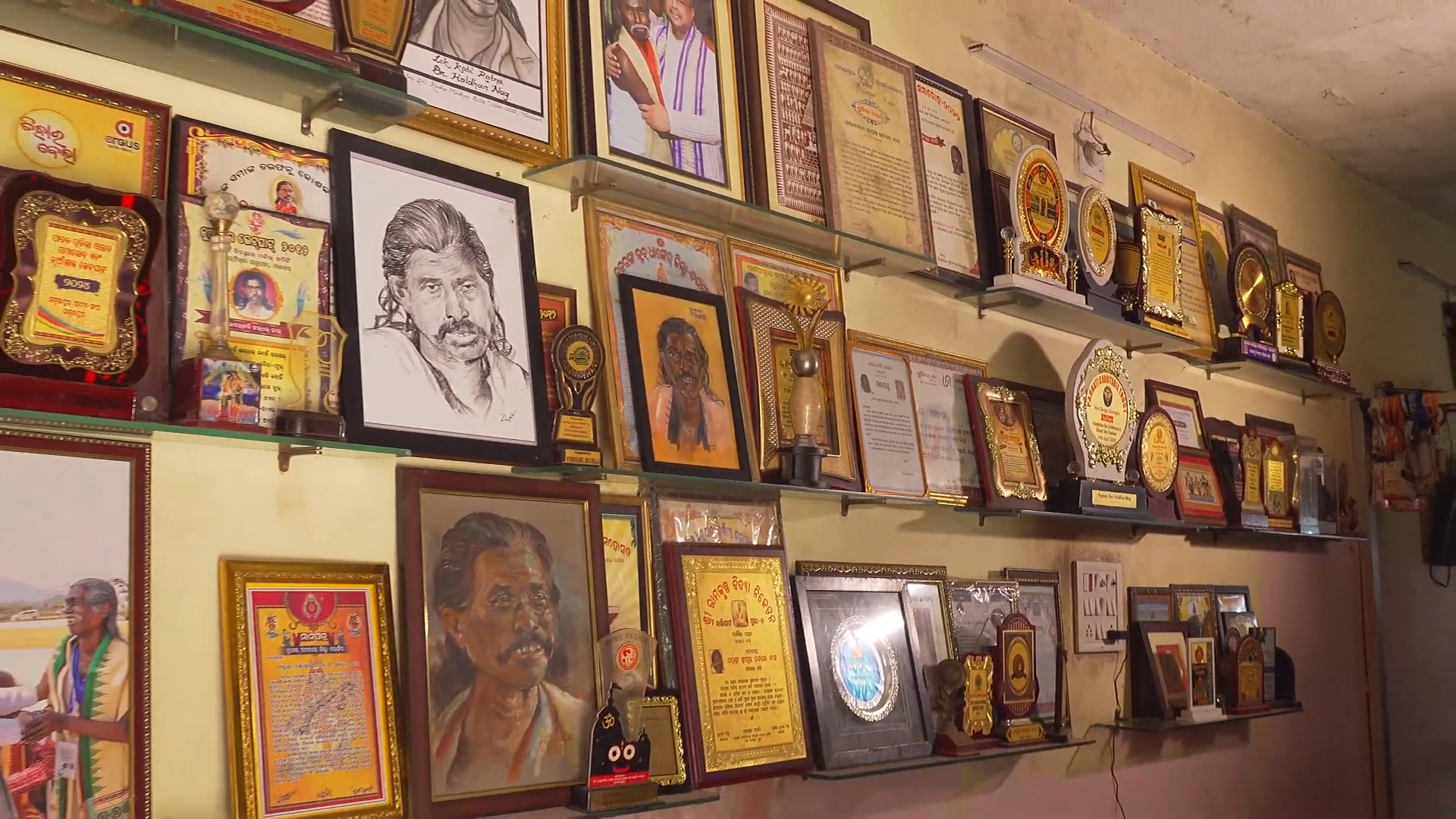
In a corner of the interior (taken in September 2025), various awards are displayed.

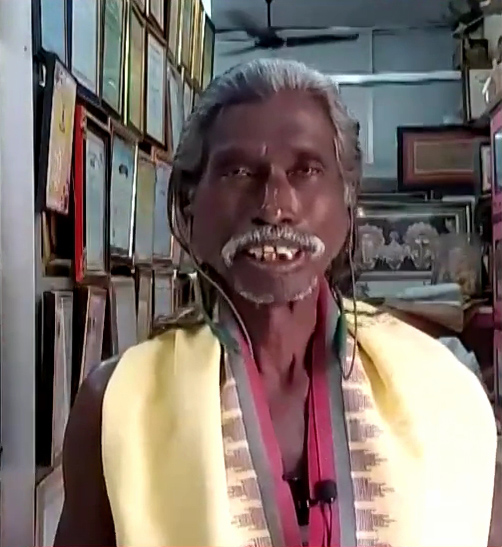
Haldhar Nag in 2022, with the interior of Haldhar Kutir in the background.

Floor plan of Padmashree Haldhar Nag Kavi Kutir (2020–2025)
