= Karunakar Singh =

Gond chieftain and anti-British rebel (d. 1858)

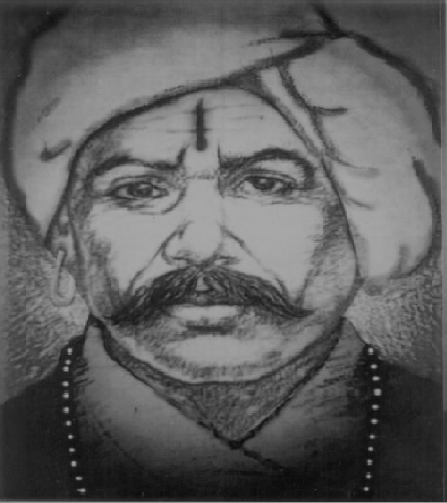
- Died: 11 February 1858; Sambalpur
- Cause of death: Death Sentence by Hanging
- Known for: Indian Freedom Struggle
- Movement: Sambalpur Uprising

Karunkar Singh Naik, commonly known as Karunakar Singh (Odia: କରୁଣାକର ସିଂହ), was an Indian chieftain and rebel leader. He was the Gond Zamindar of Kolabira in what is today the Jharsuguda district of Odisha.

He collaborated with freedom fighter Veer Surendra Sai and other rebels during the Sambalpur uprising against British East India Company troops. As a rebel leader, Karunakar played a crucial role in protecting communication channels and ensured reinforcements and supplies were available. It is believed that Karunakar commanded the rebels during Surendra Sai's absences. British troops from Madras Presidency and Nagpur attacked Karanakur's residence in Kolabira. The battle site is known as Agnitirtha (pilgrimage of holy fire) and is remembered as the last defensive stand of the rebels. Karunakar, his brother, and his nephew fought the superior forces of the British East India Company. Karunakar was later captured and hung, along with two other rebel leaders.

== British spy reports about the Kolabira Zamindari ==
As the Zamindar of Kolabira, Karunakar, along with other nearby Gauntia, inherited the right to maintain an independent militia from the Chauhan kings of Sambalpur. According to reports by British Assistant Commissioner R.T. Leigh's spies, Karunakar Singh and his 200 local fighters joined some 1400 rebels gathered in Khinda under Surendra Sai. The British spies carried an unconfirmed message that Karunakar was capable of raising a force of 8000 on short notice. This alarmed the British, who saw him as a rebel leader and a substantial threat, along with other Zamindars and Gaunitas in the region. Kolabira served as a major base for the rebellious struggle along with Khariar and Raipur.

== Operation Kolabira ==
After killing 53 rebels, along with Surendra's brother Chabila Sai, and arresting 11 at Kudopali incident, the British, under the command of Major Bates, Lieutenant Haddow, Captain E.G.Wood and Captain Knocker launched their offensive on Khinda on 4 November 1857. The attack was unsuccessful as the rebels had already departed. The British force marched to Kolabira on 6 November 1857. They launched an unsuccessful raid on Jharghati hilltop, 12 kilometers from Sambalpur, where they were expecting to find Surendra Sai with others. The rebels instead attacked the superior British force. After a brief conflict left one company Sepoy dead and another wounded, the rebels retreated, avoiding capture and leaving behind eighteen elephant loads of grain.

On reaching Kolabira, the British troops found it difficult to approach the fort due to a copse of thorny bamboo trees on the way. The fort was the residence of Karunakar and was a major base for the rebels. Company forces burned down the Demul (place of local deity) and empty houses of the villagers. According to Knocker, while finally approaching the fort, he discovered firing holes dug on the walls to facilitate musket firing from inside the structure. Haddow ordered his howitzer units to fire on the fort walls. The residence fort was burned killing rebels and villagers inside. Karunakar along with his brother Khageswar Naik and nephew Kanhei Naik resisted the attack, until running out of options and supplies.

Theories vary about the capture of Karunakar. One group of historians claims that he was captured along with 11 of his aides while sleeping. The others claim that he surrendered with 13 of his aides, including his brother and nephew given Major Edward Impey promising no harm to them. A third theory is that Karunakar was captured first and his aides surrendered at the promise that the lives of the rebels would be spared. The British hanged Karunakar on 11 February 1858 at Sambalpur after a mock trial by Lieutenant Cockburn, later defended the execution, stating that he was unaware of Impey's promise. His brother and nephew were hanged on 22 December 1861. Though other rebels were freed, the estates of rebel leaders including Kolabira were handed over to Rai Rup Singh, a treacherous local associate of the British. The ruined fort was handed to the son of Karunakara after his death.
