= Binjhal =

Binjhal (Binjhwar)
Total population
- 256,758 (2011)

Regions with significant populations
- Odisha: 137,040
- Chhatishgarh: 119,718

Languages
- Odia (Sambalpuri), Chhattisgarhi

Religion
- Animism, Hinduism

The Binjhal (also known as Binjhwar) is an ethnic group, and an offshoot of the Austroasiatic Baiga tribe, found mainly in many districts of Odisha, Chhatishgarh, Madhya Pradesh and Maharashtra in India. The 2011 census showed their population to be around 137,040. They are classified as a Scheduled Tribe by the Indian government.

== Etymology ==
There are multiple legends regarding the origin of the tribe's name. According to one legend the name is derived from the words Bin and Jhal, meaning without sweat. The name Binjhal or Binjhwar is derived from the Vindhya Range hills (also known as Vindhyanchal) and they worship their patron deity Bindhyabasini'.

== History ==
Historically the tribe has been known for fighting spirit. It is said that the tribe gave shelter to the mother of Chauhan Dynasty king Ramai Dev in 14th century. They also fought on the side of Veer Surendra Sai & Madho Singh (Ghess) during the Paika rebellion.

== Subdivisions ==
The Binjhals are divided into a number of exogamous groups called Vansas, namely Amri, Nag, Khusal, Duguke, Kamati, Mahaiinga, Bagha, Marthi Endja, Bentakar, Majhi. These are further divided into patriarchal lineages such as Surya Bansi, Nag Bansi, Hillchip, Chauhan and Rajput.

== Culture ==
Binjhal families are mostly nuclear. They follow paternal lineage and patrilocal traditions. Marriage with same exogamous vansa is prohibited. Monogamous marriages are common. Marriage by negotiation is the most common type of marriage. However cross-cousin marriage, junior levirate, junior sororate, marriage by elopement, and by capture are also allowed. Divorce, remarriage of widows, widowers and divorcees are also permitted. The groom has to pay the bride price in cash.

They practice burial in cases of deaths. However cremation is practised by the rich.

They do not have any traditional village council. Elders of the village play a central dispute resolution.

The tribe worship Hindu deities. Animist beliefs are also followed by the members.

== See also ==
- Tribes of India
