= Ghess =

Coordinates: 21.1833°N 83.2833°E

Ghess ଘେଁସ
- Village
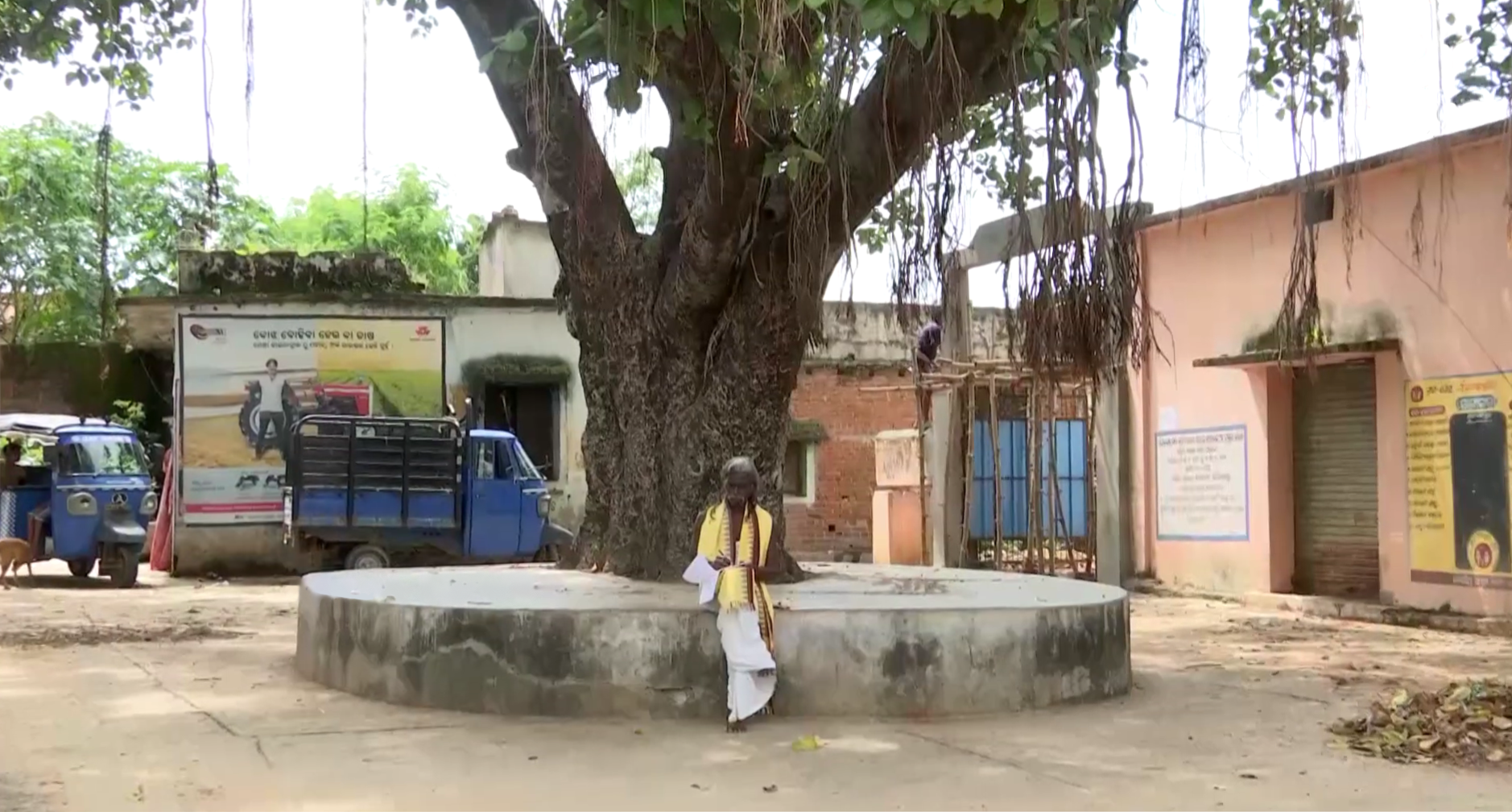
- Haldhar Nag writes poetry under a banyan tree in Ghess
- Interactive map of Ghess
- Country: India
- State: Odisha
- District: Bargarh

Languages
  - Official: Odia
- Time zone: UTC+5:30 (IST)
- Postal code: 768034
- Vehicle registration: OR-
- Nearest city: Padampur, Sohela
- Lok Sabha constituency: Bargarh
- Website: odisha.gov.in

Ghess (Odia: ଘେଁସ, romanized: Ghens, Odia pronunciation: [ɡʱẽs]) is a village in Bargarh district of western Odisha in India. Its population in 2011 was 3,342. It is known for its culture and for its role in the Indian Rebellion of 1857.

== Location ==
Ghess is situated 43 km from the district headquarters, Bargarh, and 18 km from Sohela.

== History ==
The place played an important role in the First War of Independence when the Zamindar of Ghess, Madho Singh, fought against the British along with Veer Surendra Sai, the King of Sambalpur. All male members of the Zamindar family were hanged or jailed or shot by the British. Madho Singh had four sons: Hatey Singh (hanged), Kunjal Singh (hanged), Airi Singh (shot with Chabila Sai, brother of Surendra Sai) and Bairi Singh (died out of suffocation with smoke when British set fire to the cave in which he was resting).
