= Pataneswari =

Regional Hindu goddess

Pataneswari is the tutelary deity of the city of Patna of Bihar, India.
