= Haldhar Nag =

Indian poet

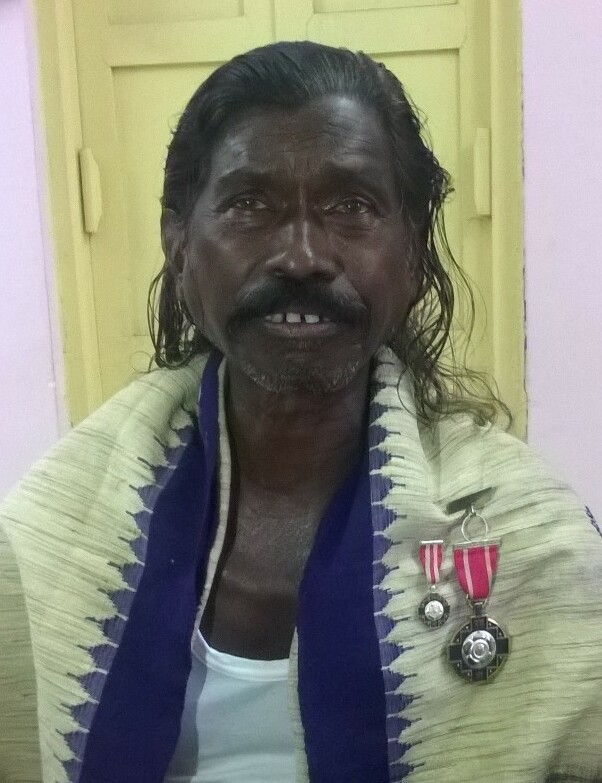
- Born: 31 March 1950 (age 76); Ghens, Bargarh, Sambalpur, Odisha, India
- Citizenship: India
- Occupations: Poet, Social worker
- Spouse: Malati Nag
- Children: 1 daughter
- Writing career
- Language: Sambalpuri
- Notable work: Kavyanjali
- Notable awards: Padma Shri

Dr. Haldhar Nag (born 31 March 1950), popularly known as Lok Kabi Ratna, is a Sambalpuri poet and writer from Bargarh, Odisha, India. He was awarded the Padma Shri, the fourth highest civilian award of India by Government of India in 2016. He has been compared to Gangadhar Meher for his style of writing.

== Personal life ==
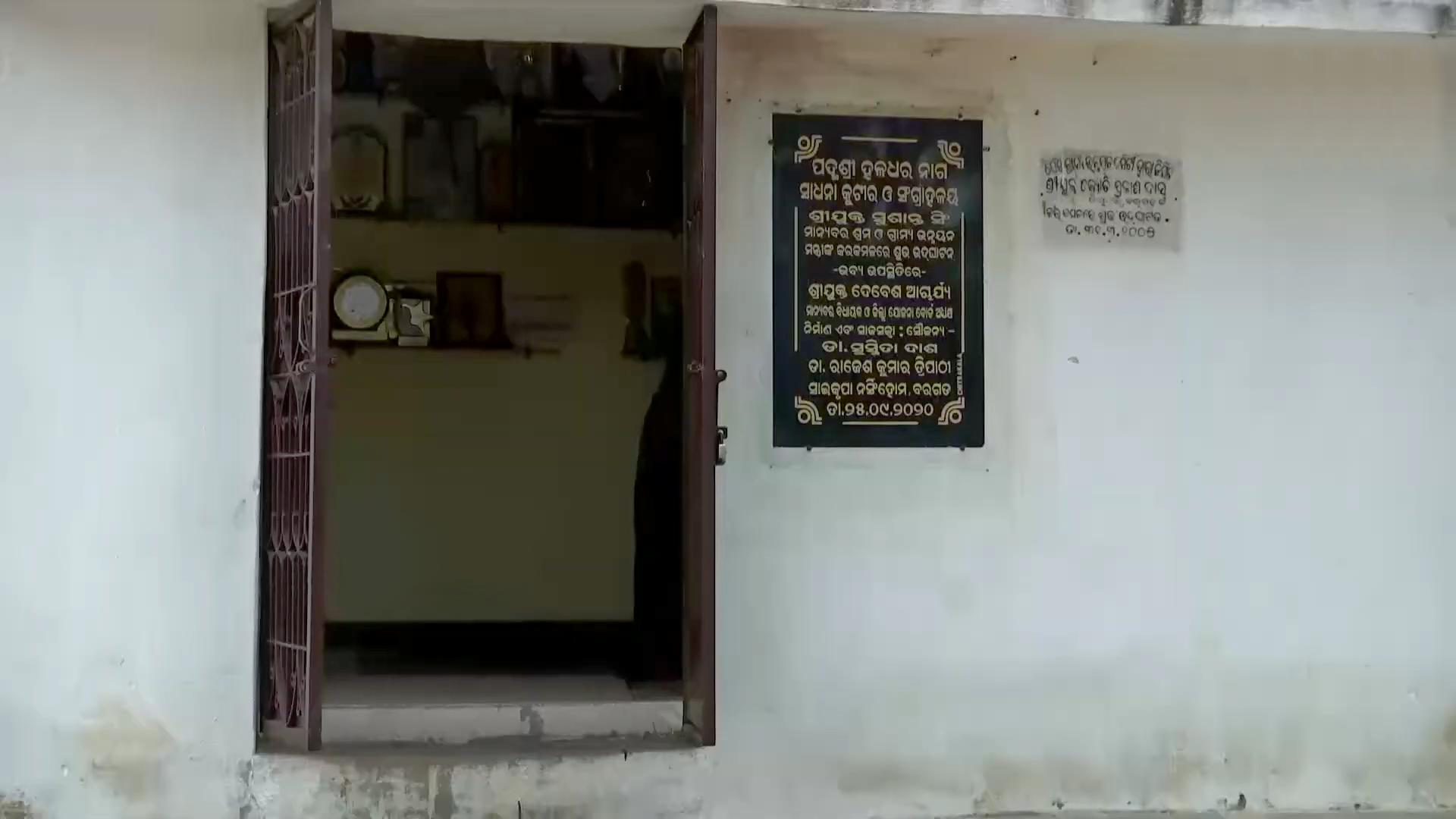
Padmashree Haldhar Nag Kavi Kutir, Nag's house.

Nag was born in a poor family of Ghens in Bargarh district of Odisha. He dropped out of school during third grade following his father's death to financially support his family.

After Nag spent two years working as a dishwasher in a sweetmeat shop, the head of his village decided to take him to work in a high school. There he spent 16 years working as a cook. During this time, he also borrowed ₹1000 to open a small stationery shop near the school.

He lives a simple life as a shop owner and hawker. He also sells Raag Chanaa (spicy chickpeas), an Indian snack popular in Western Odisha. Because he often wore a white vest and dhoti to attend events, he has been called 'The Vest Poet.'

His work was supported by Satyanarayan Mohanty of Jharsuguda, drawing the attention of the government of Odisha for the monthly honorarium for Padma Awards.

== Career ==
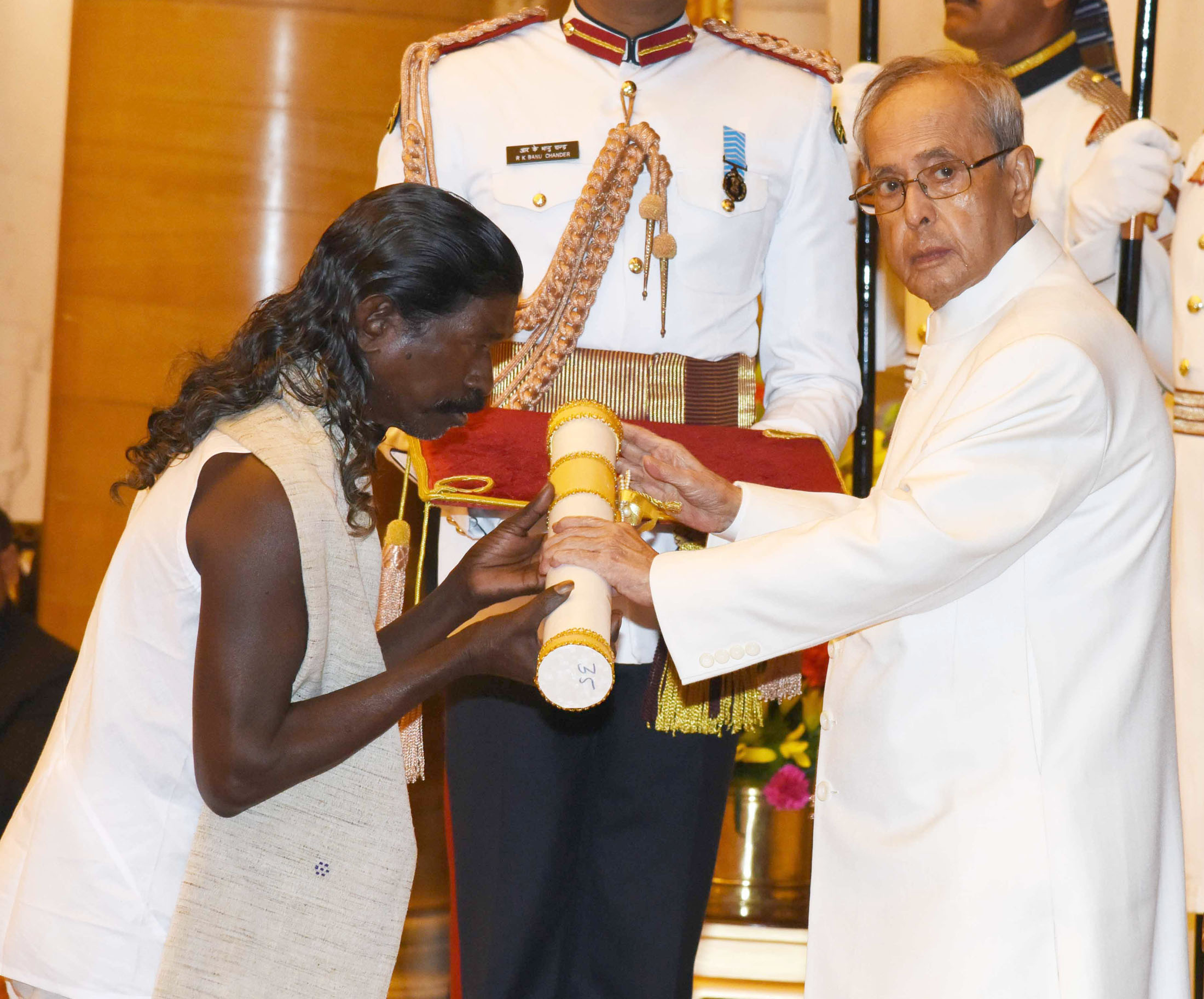
Haldhar Nag is receiving the Padma Shri award from President Pranab Mukherjee.

One of Nag's first poems was Dhodo Bargachh (The Old Banyan Tree), which he published in a local magazine. The poem was successful, and four more of his poems were published soon. His poetry is based on issues of daily life such as social issues, nature, religion and fighting oppression. He has been quoted saying "Poetry must have a real-life connection and a message for the people."

His poetry is now considered a subject of research by doctoral scholars. Sambalpur University has compiled his work in a book called Haldar Granthabali-2. He began to be known as Lok Kabi Ratna.

== Works ==
Some of his most popular works are:

- Lokgeet
- Samparda
- Krushnaguru
- Mahasati Urmila
- Tara Mandodari
- Achhia
- Bacchhar
- Siri Somalai
- Veer Surendra Sai
- Karamsani
- Rasia Kavi (biography of Tulasidas)
- Prem Paechan

Additionally, he has acted in two Sambalpuri films Sahamate Maa Samalei and Maa Budhi Kamgei Kathani. He also made a small appearance in the 2015 Hindi film Kaun Kitne Paani Mein.

=== Translations ===
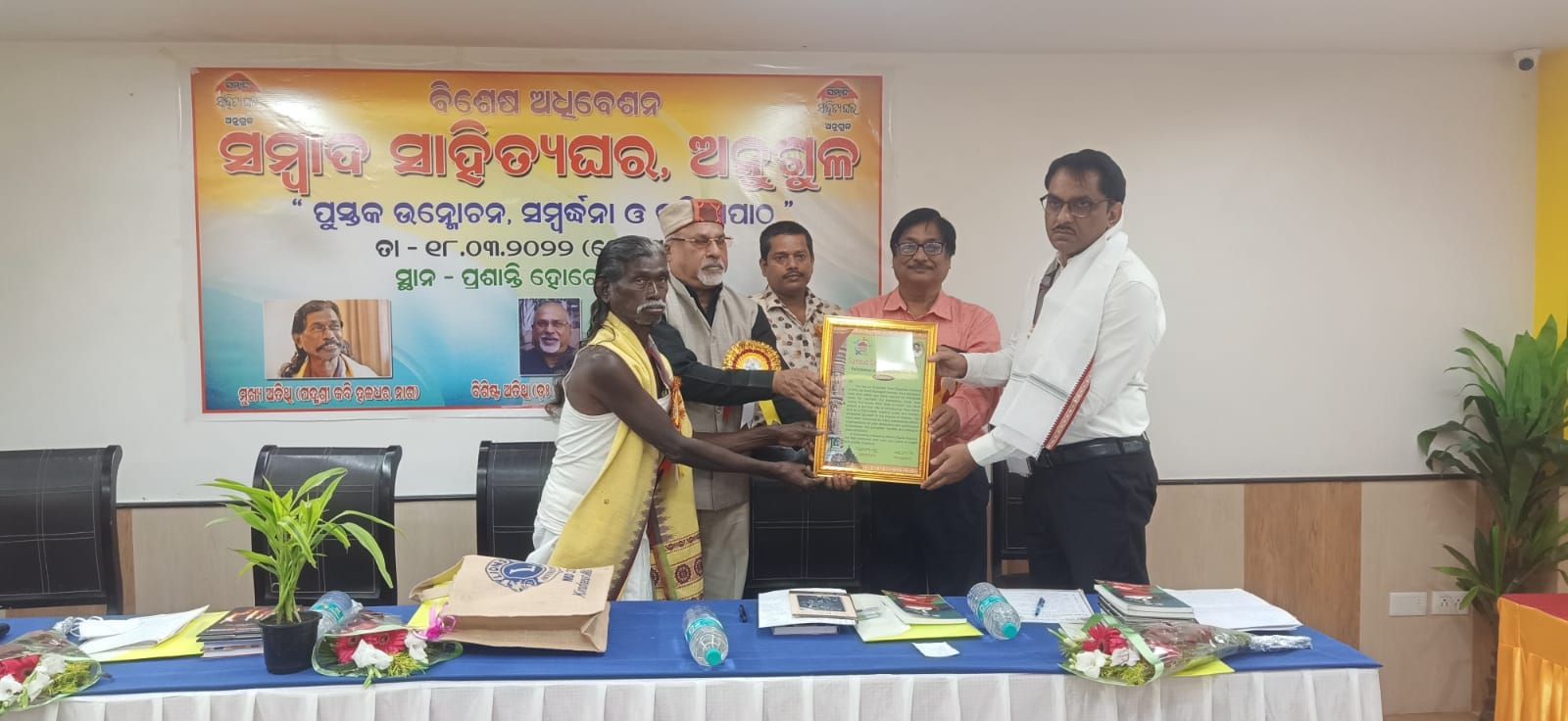
Dinesh Kumar Mali being honored in a literary program organized by Haldhar Nag's Samvad Sahitya Ghar, Angul.

In the year 2020, Hindi writer and translator Dinesh Kumar Mali translated and his released his poems in the book Haldhar Nag ka kavya-sansar. The book was intensively discussed by participants from India and abroad during a two-day international seminar organized by the Department of Hindi, Pondicherry University.

In 2021, the book Haldhar ke Lok-sahitya par vimarsh and the book Ramayan Prasangon par Haldhar ke Kavya aur yugin Vimarsh were also translated by Mali based on Ramayana contexts and published by Pandulipi Prakashan from New Delhi. They were edited by Prof. Jaishankar Babu. In November 2022, the books were honoured by Nag with the Dr Ram Manohar Tripathi Lok Seva Samman award.

== Popular media ==
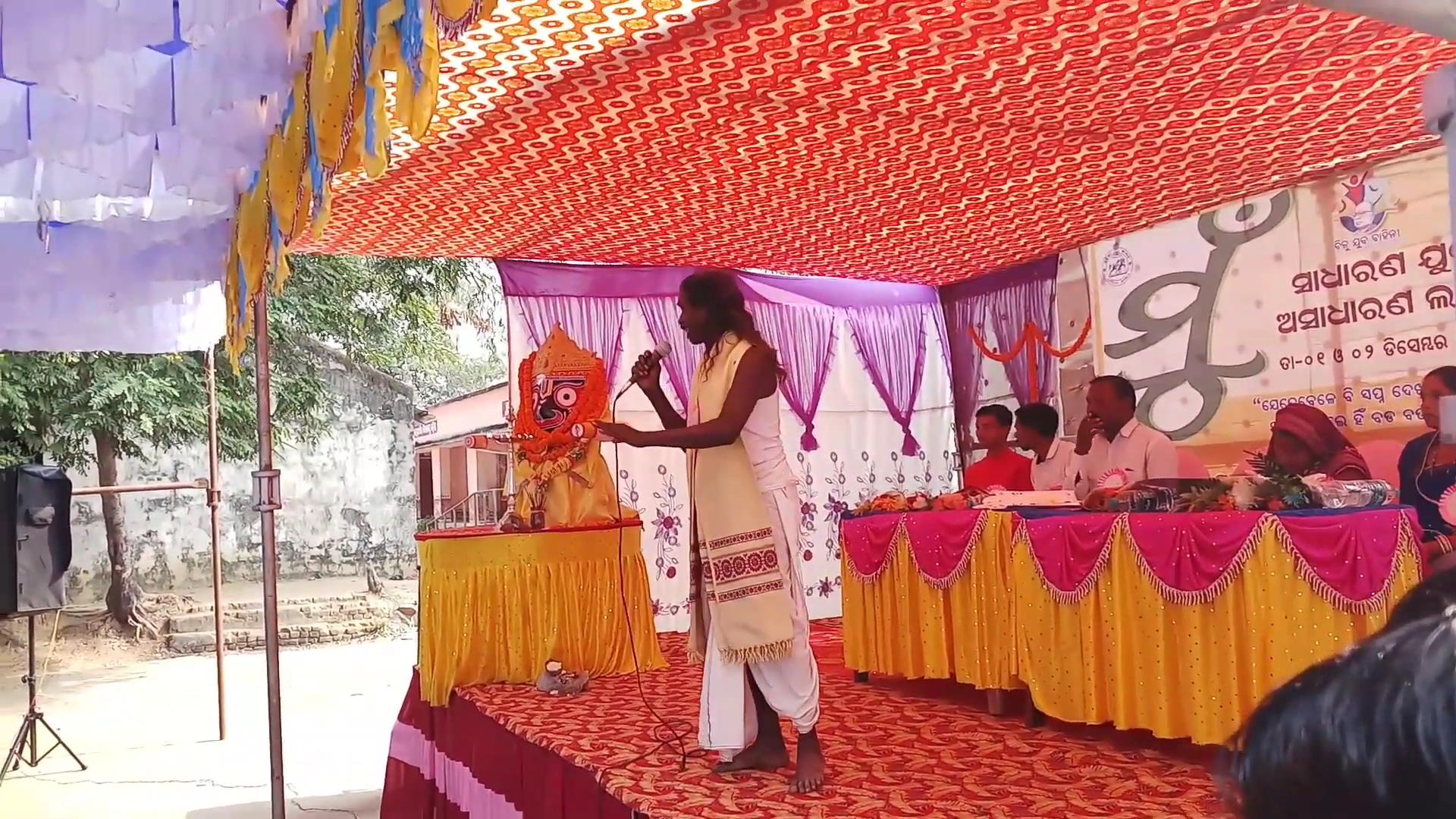
Haldhar Nag on stage, in 2018.

Documentary director Bharatbala aimed to produce 1,000 which featured unpublished stories by Nag, narrated by lyricist and film director Gulzar. His narration in this short film begins with, 'I am writing a letter to you, Haldhar, son of the soil of Sambalpur, this Adivasi poet. His language is Sambalpuri.' As part of the series, Gulzar narrated a brief summary of Nag in the approximately 8-minute long story Virtual Bharat, which is a collection of short stories about India. Following the release of the film, Gulzar also sent Nag ₹50,000 as a token of appreciation.

== Awards ==
In the year 2016, Nag received the Padma Shri award, from The 13th president of India Pranab Mukherjee for his contribution to the Sambalpuri language. In 2019, Nag was awarded an honorary doctorate in literature by Sambalpur University.

In April 2016, the then Odisha chief minister Naveen Patnaik announced that a Sambalpuri language and literature research center, named after Nag, would be established soon at the Ghens village in the Bargarh district.

== See also ==
- Sambalpuri language
- Odia language
- Odia literature
- List of Indian poets
