= Timeline of Sambalpur =

The History of Sambalpur in the Indian state of Orissa can be traced back to 100 AD. It was mentioned in the book of Ptolemy (Claudius Ptolemaeus) as Sambalaka on the left bank of river "Manada", now known as Mahanadi. Other evidence is available from the records of Xuanzang, and in the writings of the celebrated King Indrabhuti of Sambalaka of Odra Desha or Oddiyan (oldest known king of Sambalpur), the founder of Vajrayana Buddhism and the Lama cult. He has written the book Jñānasiddhi (Sanskrit: ज्ञानसिद्धिर्नामसाधनम्; IAST: jñānasiddhirnāmasādhanam; Tibetan: ཡེ་ཤེས་གྲུབ་པ་ཞེས་བྱ་བའི་སྒྲུབ་པའི་ཐབས, Wylie: ye shes grub pa zhes bya ba'i sgrub pa'i thabs which is T2219 of the Tibetan Tengyur).

== Up to 18th century ==
1540 - Balaram Dev established his new capital at Sambalpur.

French merchant Jean Baptiste Tavernier (1605–1689) visited Sambalpur.

== 19th century ==
1800 - Sambalpur came under the Bhonslas of Nagpur.

1825 to 1827, Lieutenant Colonel Gilbert (1785–1853), later Lieutenant General Sir Walter Raleigh Gilbert, first baronet, G.C.B., was the Political Agent for the South West Frontier with headquarters at Sambalpur. He made few paintings during his stay at Sambalpur by an unknown artist, which are currently with the British Library and Victoria and Albert Museum.

1849 - British seized the state under the Doctrine of Lapse.

1857 - Sambalpur Municipality established.

1858 - Sambalpur was transferred to Cuttack division.

1862 - Sambalpur along with other princely states of Western Orissa was included in the newly created Chhattisgarh division of Central Province.

1893 - The Bengal-Nagpur Railway Company opens a branch line to Sambalpur, it opened to goods traffic on 1 February and for passengers on 10 March.

1896 - Hindi was made official language of Sambalpur, by abolishing Odia language, which after violent protests by people was reinstated again in 1903

1903 - Hindi is abolished and Odia is reinstated as the official language again.

1905 - Sambalpur district is transferred to the Orissa Division of the Bengal Presidency.

1936 - New province of Orissa is formed.

== 20th century ==
1956 Hirakud Dam was constructed and VSSUT started functioning as University College of Engineering, Burla.

1966 Sambalpur University Act was passed.

1967 Sambalpur University located at Burla started functioning.

1980 A devastating flood inundated parts of Sambalpur.
