= Ong River =

Indian river

Coordinates: 20°54′N 83°49′E

Ong River is a tributary of Mahanadi river. It flows across Odisha and joins Mahanadi 240 km (150 mi) upstream of Sonepur where the Tel merges. The river rises at an elevation of 457 m (1,499 ft) and runs 204 km (127 mi) before it meets the Mahanadi. It drains an area of about 5,128 km^{2} (1,980 sq mi).

Nearby rivers to Ong river: Tel Nadi 76 km (47 mi), Gorkha Nadi 171 km (106 mi), Subarnarekha River/Swarnarekha River 431 km (268 mi), Godavari 485 km (301 mi), Manairu Vagu 508 km (316 mi).
