= Veer Surendra Sai =

Freedom fighter and revolutionary from Odisha

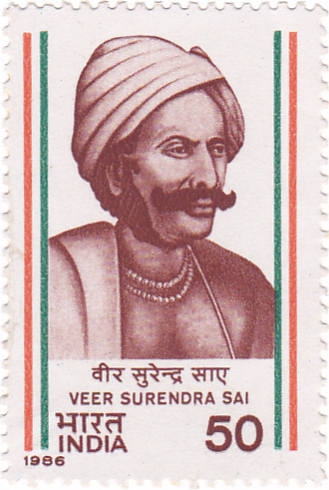
- Sai on 1986 stamp of India

Raja of Sambalpur State ( legal successor/ claimant )
- Predecessor: Maharaj Sai
- Successor: Mitrabhanu Sai
- Born: 23 January 1809; Khinda,Sambalpur, Bengal Presidency, British India, Now Odisha
- Died: 28 February 1884 (aged 75); Asirgarh, Central Provinces, British India, now Madhya Pradesh
- House: House of Chauhans of Sambalpur ( Khinda branch )

Bira Surendra Sai (23 January 1809 – 28 February 1884) was an Indian revolutionary and freedom fighter from what is now Odisha. He fought against the British rule in India after they dethroned the rulers of the Sambalpur State.

Bira Surendra Sai and his associates who were Madho Singh, Kunjal Singh, Airi Singh, Bairi Singh, Uddant Sai, Ujjal Sai, Khageswar Dao, Karunakar Singh, Salegram Bariha, Gobinda Singh, Pahar Singh, Rajee Ghasia, Kamal Singh, Hati Singh, Salik Ram Bariha, Loknath Panda/Gadtia, Mrutunjaya Panigrahi, Jagabandu Hota, Padmanabha Guru, Trilochan Panigrahi, and many others worked together and separately to counter British colonial expansion in India, preventing the British authorities from assuming control over the majority of Western Odisha region for a significant period of time. Many of them were tried and executed by the colonial authorities; Hatte Singh died at the cellular jail (also known as kala pani) in the Andamans. Lion of Sambalpur Veer Surendra Sai died in Asirgarh Jail on 28 February 1884.

== Early life and background ==
Sai was born on 23 January 1809 in the small village, Khinda, about 40 km to the north of Sambalpur, Odisha. He was one of Dharma Singh's seven children, belonging to the ruling clan of Sambalpur State. He belonged to the branch initiated by Anirudha Sai --- son of Madhekara Sai --- fourth king of Chauhan dynasty.

== Pretender to the throne ==
Maharaj Sai, the last Maharajah of Sambalpur belonged to the Chauhan dynasty. This dynasty had several members and many branches. In Sambalpur, the Maharajah could only be a male and as Maharaj Sai had no sons, he chose Surendra Sai as his legal successor. Surendra Sai was a descendant of Prince Aniruddha Sai, the brother of Maharajah Madhukar of Sambalpur who ruled many years ago. This claim however was refused by the British as Surendra Sai wished for full independent administration and did not want to be in any way affiliated with the British.

== Revolt for the throne ==
In 1827 ruler of Sambalpur, Raja Maharaja Sai died without an heir. The British Government installed his widow Rani Mohan Kumari as the ruler of the state. This conflicted the established norms in which only the male rulers were acceptable to the population. As a result, disturbances broke out, and conflict increased between the recognized ruler and other claimants to the throne of Sambalpur. Surendra Sai being one of the descendants of the ruling clan, had the most prominent claim. In time Rani Mohan Kumari became unpopular. Her land revenue policy did not satisfy the Gond and Binjhal tribal zamindars and subjects who suspected loss of power to the British. The British authorities removed Rani Mohan Kumari from power and put Narayan Singh, a descendant of royal family but born of a low caste, as the king of Sambalpur. The British Government ignored the claim of Surendra Sai for succession. Rebellion broke out in the regime of Narayan Singh. Surendra Sai and his close associates, the Gond zamindars, created many disturbances. In an encounter with the British troops Surendra Sai, his brother Udyanta Sai and his uncle Balaram Singh were captured and sent to the Hazaribagh Jail where Balaram Singh died. King Narayan Singh died in 1849. By virtue of the Doctrine of Lapse, Lord Dalhousie annexed Sambalpur in 1849, as Narayan Singh had no male successor to succeed him. During the uprising of 1857 the sepoys set Surendra Sai and his brother Udyant Sai free. The resistance to British continued in Sambalpur under the leadership of Surendra Sai. He was supported by his brothers, sons, relatives and some Zamindars.

== Uprising ==
Sai began protesting against the British at the age of 18 in 1827. He was arrested for the first time in 1840 and sent to Hazaribagh Jail. He was broken out of Hazaribagh prison by the fighters during 1857 rebellion. He moved his operations to the hilly tracts of Odisha and continued resistance until his surrender in 1862 . Before his surrender he spent 17 years in prison at Hazaribagh and after his final arrest served a term of 20 years including his detention of 19 years in the remote Asirgarh hill fort until he died.

== Attempts made to suppress him ==
The Indian Rebellion of 1857 collapsed by the end of 1858 and law and order was restored by the British throughout India, but he continued his revolution. The military resources of the British were pulled up against him and the Generals like Major Forster, Capt. L. Smith and others who earned credit in suppressing the rebellion elsewhere in India were brought to Sambalpur to stamp out his revolution. But all attempts failed and Surendra Sai succeeded in foiling strategy of the British for a long time. Major Forster, the reputed general who was vested with full military and civil power and the authorities of a Commissioner to suppress Surendra Sai and his followers, was removed by the British authority in 1861 after three years in Sambalpur. His successor Major Impey could not defeat Sai. The British seized the entire food-stock of the rebels, stopped all resources of the supply of food and other necessaries of life for them. Major Impey abandoned the idea of violent war and cautiously followed the policy of peace and good-will with the approval of the Government of India. Surendra Sai, surrendered with full faith in the honesty and integrity of the British Government. However, after the death of Impey, situations took a sudden change and the British administrators revived their hostility towards him.

== Last days ==
Sambalpur was brought under the jurisdiction of the newly created Central Provinces on 30 April 1862; Veer Surendra Sai decided to surrender soon after. However, he was said to have been disillusioned and the new setup indulged in reversal of the old liberal policy. The administrators found that the surrender of Veer Surendra Sai did not bring the revolution to an end. They stepped down to organise a conspiracy and made sudden arrest of Veer Surendra Sai and all his relations, friends and followers. Sai and six of his followers were subsequently detained in the Asirgarh hill fort. Sai spent the last part of his life in captivity. In 1884 on 23 May, Surendra Sai died in the Asirgarh fort, away from his native land.

Sambalpur was one of the last patch of land to be occupied by the British Empire in India, not counting the Princely States. This was largely due to the efforts of veer Surendra Sai. He was a very good swordsman. People of the region affectionately called him as Bira (or "Veer" meaning courageous) Surendra Sai.

== Recognition ==
- In 2009, The Government of Odisha changed the name of University College of Engineering (the oldest engineering college of the state) to Veer Surendra Sai University of Technology, Burla in honour of this great leader.
- In 2005, Government of India installed a statue of Veer Surendra Sai at the premises of Parliament of India.
- The Veer Surendra Sai Medical College, ESTD- 1959, located in Burla, Sambalpur, has been named after him.
- Government of India has released a postal stamp in his honour.
- On 23 January 2009 people of Odisha as well as India celebrated the 2nd Birth Centenary of Veer Surendra Sai. On the occasion, 'Paschim Odisha Agrani Sangathan' of Bhubaneswar brought out a book titled Veer Surendra Sai edited by Dr. Chitrasen Pasayat and Dr. Prabhas Kumar Singh. Also, another book titled Veer Surendra Sai: The Great Revolutionary edited by Dr. Chitrasen Pasayat and Sri Sashanka Shekhar Panda has been published by Anusheelan, Sambalpur.
- Veer Surendra Sai Stadium in Sambalpur, Odisha is named after him.
- In September 2018 Jharsuguda became the second city in Odisha to have an airport, which was named in honour of Sai.
- VSS (Veer Surendra Sai) Market Complex has been made in his honour at Chhend Colony of Rourkela, Odisha.
