= Sagunbhadi =

- Village
- Location in Odisha, India Sagunbhadi (India)
- Coordinates: 20.1268°N 82.645°E
- Country: India
- State: Odisha
- District: Nuapada

Languages
  - Official: Odia English
  - Local: Sambalpuri
- Time zone: UTC+5:30 (IST)
- Telephone code: 06672
- Vehicle registration: OD
- Website: odisha.gov.in

Sagunbhadi is a village in Sinapali Block of Nuapada district, in Odisha, India. The village is situated in the bank of river Udanti.

== Demography ==
As of 2011 census Total population of sagubhadi is 2056

- male-1003
- female-1053
- total sc population-423

( male-229 female-194 )

- total st population-22 (male -13 female-09 )
- total literacy-1596 (male -906 female -790 )
- percentage of literacy-80%

== Education ==
There are many educational institute in the village, namely

- U.P.M.E school
- M.E school
- BELARANEE HIGH SCHOOL
- KING STAR PUBLIC SCHOOL
- Kendriya vidyalaya
- TOLTIA junior college

== Near Town ==
Sagunbhadi is a small town in the bank of Udanti river near sinapali. The nearest towns are

- Sinapali 2 km
- Brahmanpada 10Km
- Gandabahali 10Km
- Khariar 30 km
- Bargaon, Odisha 40Km
- Nuapada 90 km
- Boden 25 km
- Dharmagarh 45 km

== Natural place ==
- Udanti river
- Jharia (forest)
