= Brahmanpada, Nuapada =

Brahmanpada Bamhanpada, Bamhanpara
- Village
- Nickname: BRPD
- Location in Odisha, India Brahmanpada (India)
- Coordinates: 20.045753°N 82.657542°E
- Country: India
- State: Odisha
- District: Nuapada

Population (2011)
  - Total: 1,349

Languages
  - Official: Odia and English
  - Local: Sambalpuri
- Time zone: UTC+5:30 (IST)
- PIN: 766108
- Telephone code: 766108
- Vehicle registration: OD, OR
- Sex ratio: 50.3:49.7 ♂/♀
- Website: odisha.gov.in

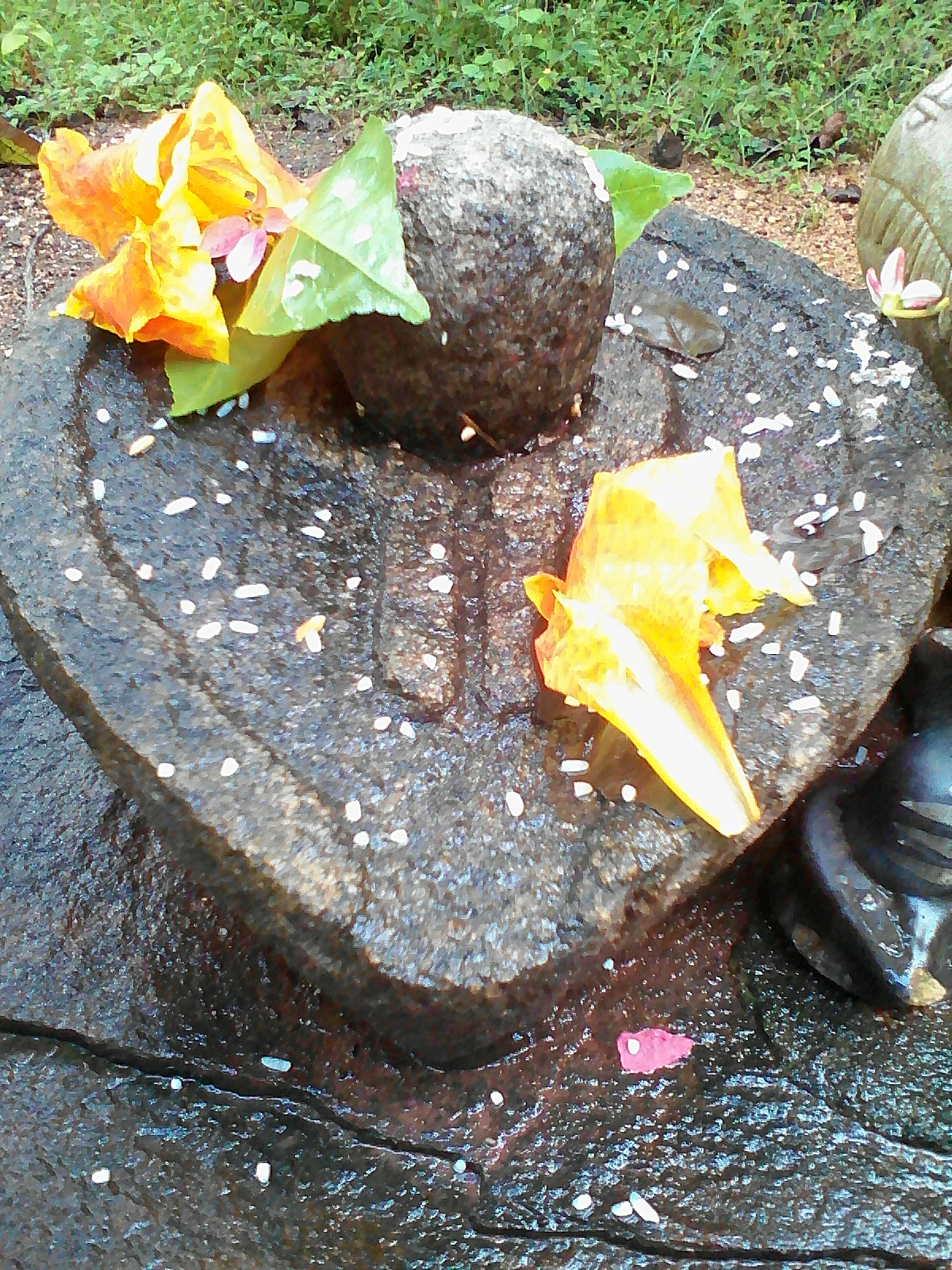
Sib ling of Jogimath Sib temple, Jogimath, Brahmanpada

Brahmanpada (also known as Bamhanpada and Bahmanpara) is a village in Western Odisha, India. It is in the Sinapali Tehsil, in the southern part of the Nuapada district. The distance from the district Headquarters Nuapada to Brahmanpada is about 100 km, while it is much closer to the Chhattisgarh state border, which is just 5 km away.

== Nearby towns ==
Brahmanpada is a village in the Sinapali Block. Nearby towns include:

- Sinapali 7 km
- Gandabahali 14 km
- Khariar 33 km
- Bargaon, Odisha 45 km
- Nuapada 99 km
- Boden 28 km
- Dharamgarh 29 km
- Raipur 230 km
- Deobhog 18 km

== Demographics ==
According to the 2011 census of India, Brahmanpada has 323 households. The effective literacy rate (i.e. the literacy rate of population excluding children aged 6 and below) is 56%.

Demographics (2011 Census)
	Total	Male	Female
Population	1349	652	697
Children aged below 6 years	191	89	102
Scheduled caste	410	199	211
Scheduled tribe	286	136	150
General	653	317	336
Literates	56%		
