= Sinapali Block =

- Panchayat Samiti
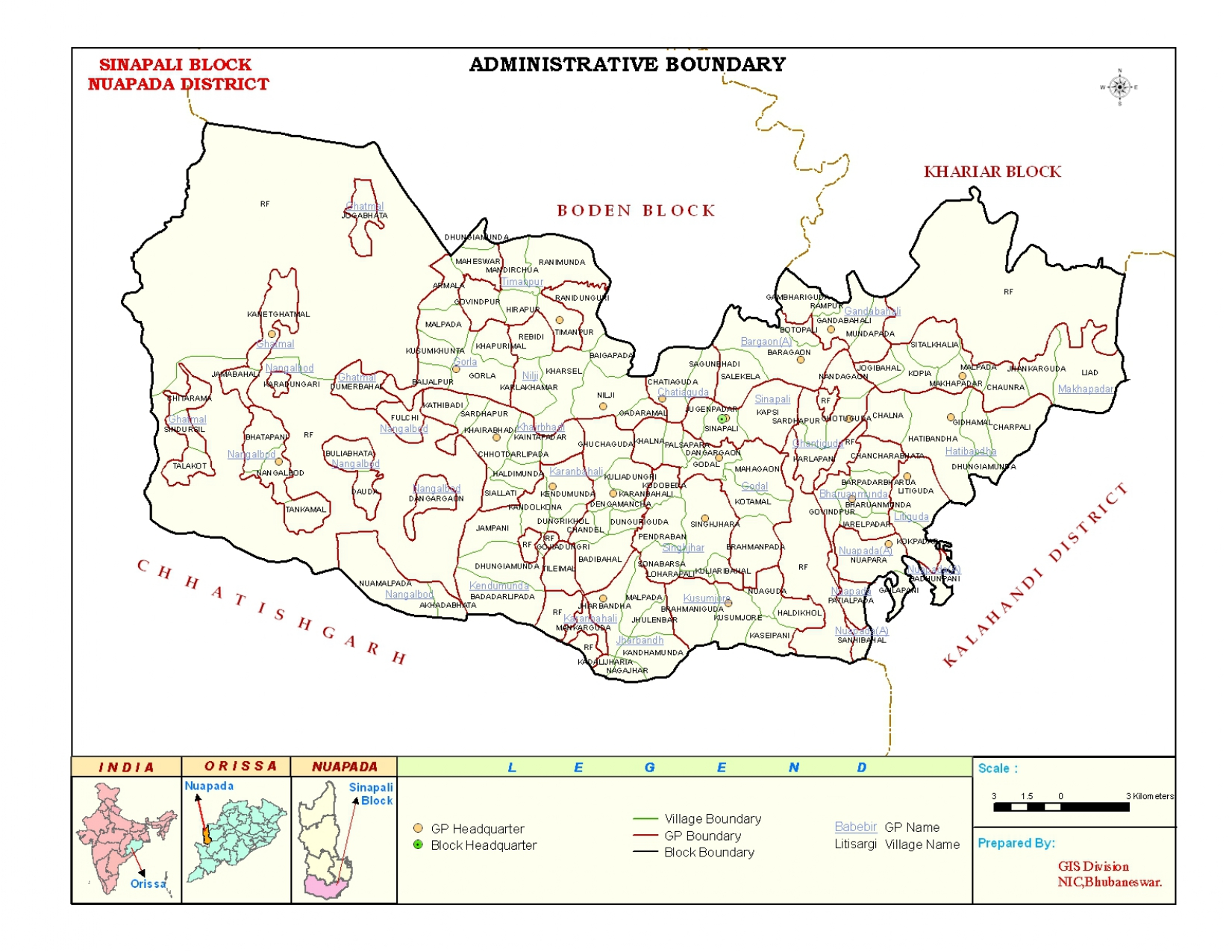
- Administrative Map
- Country: India
- State: Odisha
- District: Nuapada

Government
  - Type: Rural Local Self – Government
  - Body: Panchayat Samiti
  - BDO: Sarbeswar Jal, OAS
  - Tahasildar: Upanjali Majhi, OAS

Area
  - Total: 420.44 km^{2} (162.33 sq mi)

Population (2011)
  - Total: 109,870
  - Density: 261.32/km^{2} (676.82/sq mi)
- PIN: 766108

Sinapali is a Panchayat Samiti (Block) in Nuapada District of Odisha. There are five blocks in Nuapada and Sinapali one of them.

== Geography ==
Sinapali Block Situated in Southern part of Nuapada district.

== Administration ==
Sinapali is a Panchayat Samiti (Block) and Tahasil in Nuapada District of Odisha. Administrative head of the block is Block Development Officer (BDO). There are many block level offices are located. Some of them are as follows:-

- Tahasil Office
- Block Education Office
- Police Station
- Fire Station
- Community Health Center
- Regional Agriculture Office

=== Government ===
Sinapali Panchayat Samiti have a chairman in its Block level.

=== Gram Panchayat ===
There are 27 Gram Panchyats.

Sl No	Name of GP	Sl No	Name of GP
1	Kaintapadar	15	Chatiaguda
2	Karanbahali	16	Timanpur
3	Kusumjor	17	Niljee
4	Kendumunda	18	Bargaon
5	Khairpadar	19	Makhapadar
6	Ghatmal	20	Ranimunda
7	Ghuchaguda	21	Godal
8	Jharbandh	22	Ghantiguda
9	Nangalbod	23	Nuapada
10	Nuamalpada	24	Bharuamunda
11	Singjhar	25	Sinapali
12	Kharsel	26	Hatibanda
13	Gandabahali	27	Litiguda
14	Gorla		

=== Major Place or Small Towns ===
There have many Large Villages and towns in Sinapali block. Some important Place, Villages and towns mentioned in below.

- Hatibandha
- Gandabahali
- Singjhar
- Kendumunda
- Niljee
- Brahmanpada, Nuapada
- Chalna
- Timanpur
- Nangalbod
- Bargaon
- Bharuamunda
