= Gandabahali =

- Village/Town
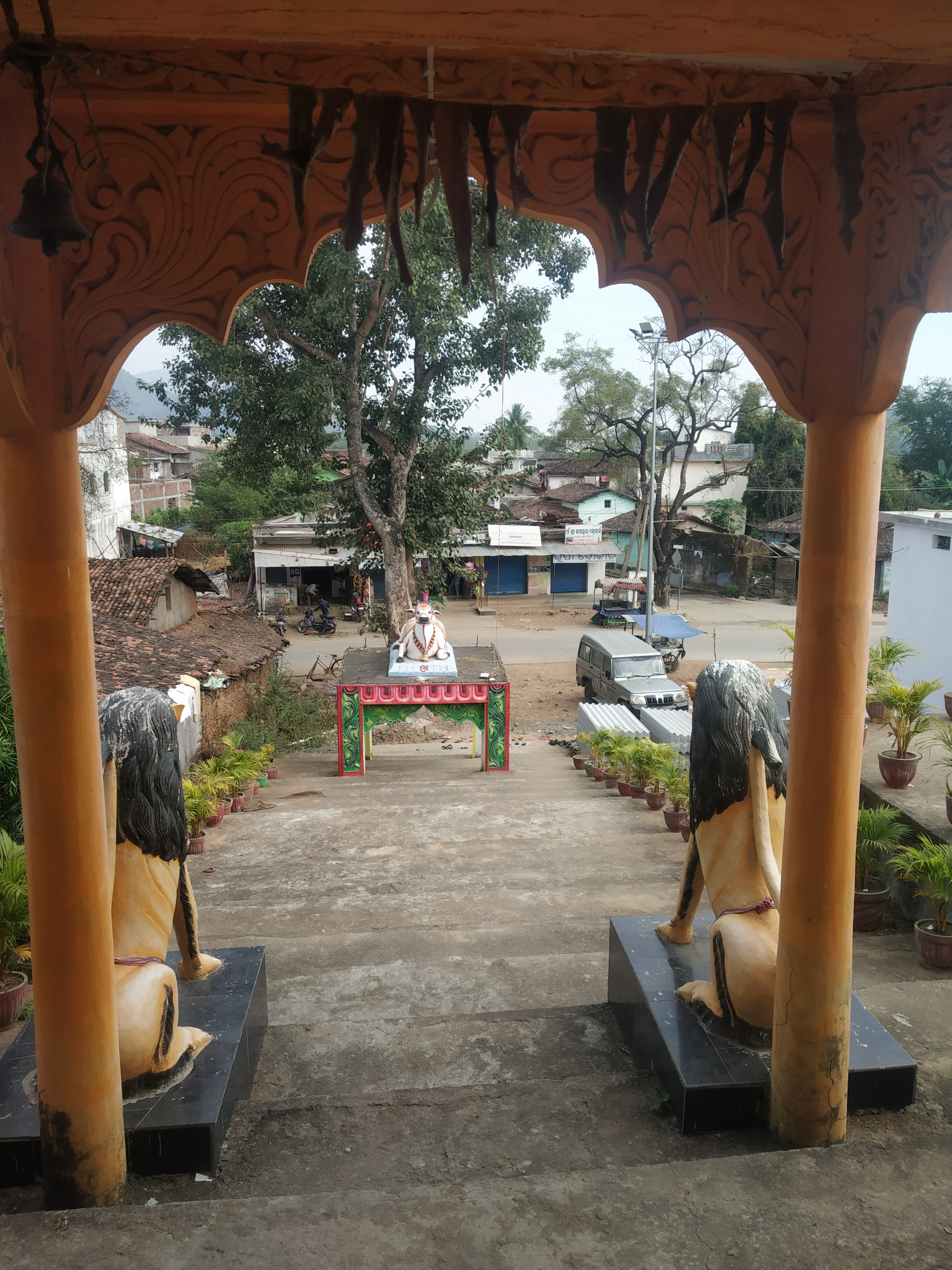
- Shiv Temple at Gandabahali
- Nickname: The Village of Festival
- Location in Odisha, India Gandabahali (India)
- Coordinates: 20.1532°N 82.7104°E
- Country: India
- State: Odisha
- District: Nuapada
- Block: Sinapali

Government
  - Body: Gram Panchayat Samiti
  - Sarpanch: Koushalya Meher
  - MP: Basanta Kumar Panda
  - MLA: Adhiraj Mohan Panigrahi

Area
  - Total: 6.53 km^{2} (2.52 sq mi)

Population (2011)
  - Total: 2,293
  - Density: 351/km^{2} (909/sq mi)
- Demonym: Ganabehelia

Languages
  - Official: English
  - Local: Kalahandia Sambalpuri Hindi Odia Chhattisgarhi
- Time zone: UTC+5:30 (IST)
- PIN: 766118
- Telephone code: 06677
- Vehicle registration: OD, OR
- Sex ratio: 50.3:49.7 ♂/♀
- Website: https://nuapada.nic.in/

Gandabahali (also spelled Ganabeheli) is a village in Sinapali Block in the south of Nuapada District in Odisha, India.

Gandabahali is a village surrounded by Chahara forest in the east, Patalganga in the west, the Sundar river in the north, and the Udanti river in the south. Gandabahali is one of the largest villages and a place of historical significance in the Sinapali Block. Local people call it the village of festivals because 13 festivals are celebrated in this village in 12 months. It is located on the banks of the Udanti River, 88 kilometres (55 mi) south of the district headquarters of Nuapada and 443 km (275 mi) from Odisha's capital, Bhubaneswar. The village has a Gram panchayat (Local Governing Council).

== History ==
The region of Gandabahali was under the rule of the Chauhan dynasty of Patna State (established by Ramai Deva in the 14th century) who were vassals of the Eastern Ganga dynasty which was declining following invasions from the northern part of the Indian subcontinent. The Chauhan reign from Patnagarh continued over the region and later expanded through the establishment of their cadet branches extending their rule over areas of Western Odisha and eastern Chhattisgarh.

In 1600, Raja Gopal Rai who belonged to the Chauhan family of Balangir was crowned as the first king of Khariar. In 1820, Raja Ratan Singh Deo (Chauhan King of Khariar) shifted his capital from Komna to Khariar. The region is said to have came under British control in 1828 after Maratha king defeated the Chauhan ruler. In the year 1862 it was in Madhya Pradesh, in 1857 it was under Nagpur, then in 1862 it would be under Raipur.

When Odisha got independence as a state on 1 April 1936, the village came under the district of Sambalpur. When Odisha was reorganised in 1949, the village came under the district of Kalahandi. After that, on 1 April 1993, Nuapada became a separate district carved out from the undivided Kalahandi district. Then, the village comes under the district of Nuapada and the block of Sinapali. It now then becomes a separate Gram Panchayat under the block of Sinapali. It is the biggest gram Panchayat of the Block of Sinapali and is an old village in this particular area of Gandabahali.

Some communities like Damba and Kandha have been living in this village from the ancient times. It is considered that it might be the name of this village as their name of the community. Then, some other communities came to this village and settled there. Most of the people in this village are part of the Bhulia (Meher) Community. They came from the city of Patnagarh and Sambalpur. This village is now known as the Bhulia (Meher) Community.

== Geography ==
Gandabahali is located in the western part of Odisha, at 20.1532°N 82.7104°E. It is close to the border of Raipur District, Chhattisgarh and Kalahandi District. It is located in a rain shadow belt, in the Mahanadi basin of the Eastern Ghats where mountains are interspersed with wide valleys. The climate is tropical, with rain in the South West monsoon season.

== Population ==
Gandabahali has a total population of 2,293, out of which the male population is 1,126 while the female population is 1,167. Literacy rate of gandabahali village is 61.01% out of which 67.50% males and 54.76% females are literate. There are about 551 houses in gandabahali village.

Census Parameter	Census Data
Total population	2293
Total no. of houses	551
Female population %	50.9 % ( 1167)
Total literacy rate %	61.0 % ( 1399)
Female literacy rate	27.9 % ( 639)
Scheduled tribes population %	17.8 % ( 409)
Scheduled caste population %	14.5 % ( 332)
Working population %	31.1 %
Child(0 -6) Population by 2011	269
Girl Child(0 -6) Population % by 2011	46.8 % ( 126)

Particulars	Total	Male	Female
Total population	2,293	1,126	1,167
Literate population	1,399	760	639
Illiterate population	894	366	528
