= Pendren =

Pendren Pendraban
- Village
- Interactive map of Pendren
- Country: India
- State: Odisha
- District: Nuapada
- Block: Sinapali

Area
  - Total: 3.42 km^{2} (1.32 sq mi)

Population (2011)
  - Total: 723

Languages
  - Official: Odia
- Time zone: UTC+5:30 (IST)
- PIN: 766108

Pendren (also referred to as Pendraban in official records) is a village in Sinapali block of Nuapada district in the Indian state of Odisha. The village covers a geographical area of 342 hectares.

== Administration ==
Pendren falls under the Khariar Assembly constituency of the Odisha Legislative Assembly.

== Education ==
Pendren has a government primary school, which also serves as a polling station as per the electoral rolls of Odisha.

== Demographics ==
According to the 2011 Census of India, Pendren had a population of 723 living in 185 households. Scheduled Castes(SC) constituted 69 residents and Scheduled Tribes(ST) 284 residents of the total population. Children aged 0–6 numbered 97, constituting 13.42% of the total population. The literacy rate of the village was 44.12%.
