= Parashkhol =

Parashkhol is a village near Nuapada in Nuapada district of Odisha state of India.
