= Dharamsagar =

Coordinates: 20°24′N 82°41′E

- village
- Location in Odisha, India Dharamsagar (India)
- Country: India
- State: Odisha
- District: Nuapada
- Talukas: Dharamsagar

Population (2011)
  - Total: 669

Languages
- Time zone: UTC+5:30 (IST)
- Website: odisha.gov.in

Dharamsagar is a village in Nuapada district in the state of Odisha in India.

== Geography ==
Dharamsagar is located on the Bhawanipatna–Raipur Highway (353 / SH-16) north of Khariar.

== Population ==
According to the 2011 Census of India, there were 181 households in Dharamsagar, with a total population of 669.
