= Boden Block =

Block in Odisha, India

Boden
- Town/Village
- Location in Odisha, India Boden (India)
- Coordinates: 20.2459°N 82.5600°E
- Country: India
- State: Odisha
- District: Nuapada

Government
  - Type: Gram Panchayat Samiti
  - MP: Basanta Kumar Panda (BJP)
  - MLA: Adhiraj Mohan Panigrahi (BJD)

Languages
  - Official: Odia, English
- Time zone: UTC+5:30 (IST)
- PIN: 766111
- Vehicle registration: OD-26
- Sex ratio: 49.5:50.5 ♂/♀
- Website: odisha.gov.in

Boden is one of the five blocks in the Nuapada District in the Indian state of Odisha. The five blocks are Khariar, Nuapada, Komna, Boden and Sinapali. The main town is Boden, 27 kilometres from Khariar, and 97 kilometres from Nuapada district headquarters. Fourteen Gram Panchayats and eighty-nine Revenue Villages make up the Boden block.

== Demographics ==
According to the 2011 Census of India, the Boden block contains a total population of 81,687 people (40,014 males and 41,673 females), including 21,253 families.

The total population is 99.45% Hindu, with the other 0.55% is unidentified.

The literacy is 53.3%; the male literacy rate sits at 57.23%, while female literacy is 34.13%.

Nearly 11,300 children are under age seven, making up 15% of the total population.

== Culture ==
The Odia language is the primary language, while Odia and English are used for educational purposes in most schools.

== Festivals ==
- Makar Sankranti
- Shivratri
- Holi
- Ganesh Chaturthi
- Dussehra
- Diwali

Most other Hindu Festivals are celebrated throughout Boden block.

=== Local Festivals ===
- Nuakhai
- Basikhai

== Patalganga ==
Patalganga, hosts a natural spring and is considered a holy place.

According to the local legend, Lakshmana and Sita traveled to this spot during the exile of Lord Rama. Feeling thirsty and finding no water, Lakshmana pierced the ground with his arrow, birthing the spring.
