= Komna, Nuapada =

Komna
- Town/Village
- Location in Odisha, India Komna (India)
- Coordinates: 20.50°N 82.75°E
- Country: India
- State: Odisha
- District: Nuapada

Government
  - Type: Gram Panchayat Samiti
  - MP: Basanta Kumar Panda (BJP)
  - MLA: Rajendra Dholakia (BJD)

Population (2001)
  - Total: 117,834

Languages
  - Official: Odia, English
- Time zone: UTC+5:30 (IST)
- PIN: 766106
- Vehicle registration: OD-26
- Sex ratio: 49.5:50.5 ♂/♀
- Website: odisha.gov.in
- Biggest Taluk or Block in Nuapada district

Komna is a town and block in Nuapada district of Odisha, India. Komna is the biggest block or taluk in Nuapada district. Komna is 39 km from its district's main city Nuapada, and 330 km from the state capital Bhubaneswar. This town is situated in western side of Odisha and near the border of Chhattisgarh state.

== Demographics ==
As of 2001, total population of Komna block was 117,834, where it constitutes 49.5% of male and 50.5% female. Due to the lack of infrastructure of the town because it is situated in Nuapada district which is considered as one of the backward districts of Odisha, certain communities or backward caste are most of the total population as total SC population of the town was 15,980 and Total ST population was 52086.

== Block Administration ==
It is the biggest block of Nuapada district. There are 27 Gram Panchayats (GP's) under Komna Block:

- Agreen Panchayat
- Bhella Panchayat
- Budhikomna Panchayat
- Darlipada Panchayat
- Gandamer Panchayat
- Jadamunda Panchayat
- Jatgarh Panchayat
- Jhagrahi Panchayat
- Kandetara Panchayat
- Komna Panchayat
- Konabira Panchayat
- Kureswar Panchayat
- Kurumpuri Panchayat
- Lakhna Panchayat
- Michhapali Panchayat
- Mundapala Panchayat
- Nuagaon Panchayat
- Pendrawan Panchayat
- Rajana Panchayat
- Samarsing Panchayat
- Sialati Panchayat
- Silva Panchayat
- Soseng Panchayat
- Sunabeda Panchayat
- Tarbod Panchayat
- Thickpali Panchayat
- Tikrapada Panchayat

== Languages ==
The chief communicative language of the town is Sambalpuri which is a dialect of Odia and is used as the official language for communication.

== Education ==
Due to lack of awareness about education among the people and protectiveness of the tribal peoples about females in the district as it affects the female literacy. Female literacy is very low as compared to male literacy of the block.

=== Absolute literates and literacy rate ===
According to the census of 2011, the block was

Description	2001 Census
Total	37,833
Male	26,577
Female	11,276
% Male	70
% Female	30

SCHOOLS

- Prathamika Balaka Vidyalaya, Komna
- Girls Proj U.P.School, Komna
- Jita Mitra High School, Komna
- Kasturaba Gandhi Balika Vidyalaya, Komna
- Krishna Public School, Komna
- Saraswati Shishu Vidya Mandir, Komna
- Sri Aurobindo Purnanga Shiksha Kendra, Komna

COLLEGES

- Panchayat Samiti Degree College, Komna
- Panchayat samiti Junior college Komna
- Panchayat Junior College, Budhikomna (Komna)

== Temples ==
ମା ସମଲେଶ୍ବରୀ ମନ୍ଦିର

ଶିବ ମନ୍ଦିର

ଜଗନ୍ନାଥ ମନ୍ଦିର

ମା ଚଣ୍ଡୀ ସମଲେଶ୍ବରୀ ମନ୍ଦିର,

ହନୁମାନ ମନ୍ଦିର

ମା ଭଣ୍ଡାରଘରୁଆଣି,

ମା ବୈଷ୍ଣଦେବୀ

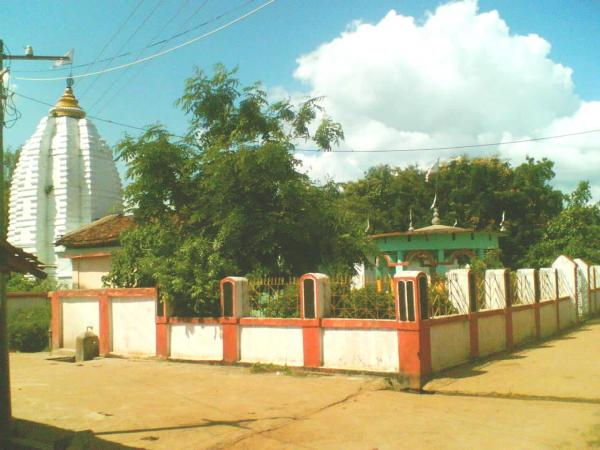
Jagannath Temple Komna

== Festivals ==
- Nuakhai
- Rathayatra
- Diwali
- Holi
- Makar Sakranti
- Dasara
