= Khariar =

Town in Odisha, India

- City
- Khadial
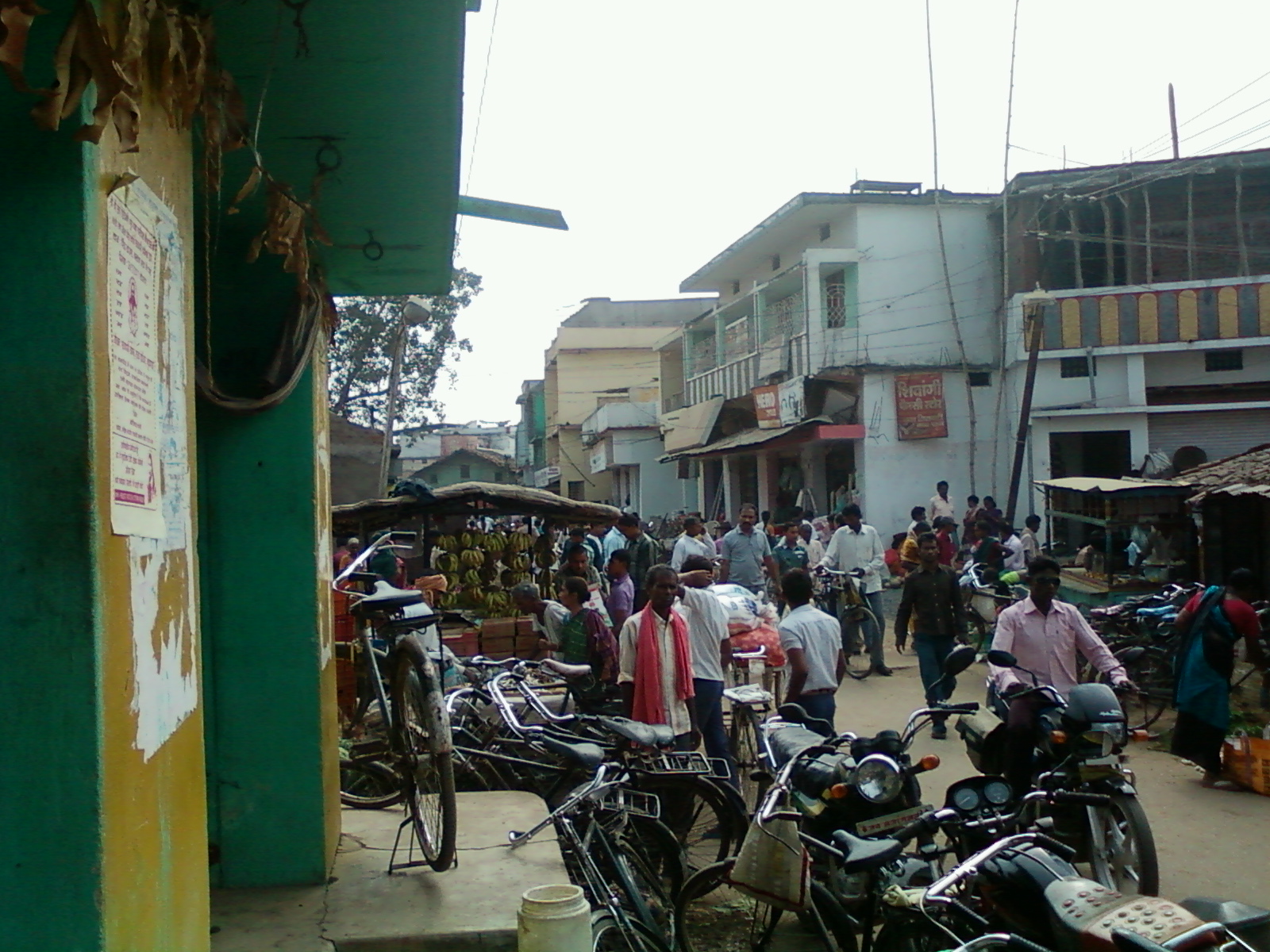
- Khariar Friday/Sukrabar Bazaar

- Location within Odisha Location within India
- Coordinates: 20°17′N 82°46′E
- Country: India
- State: Odisha
- District: Nuapada

Government
  - Type: NAC
  - Body: Khariar Notified Area Council
  - Chairman: Ujjwal Gupta
  - MLA: Sri Aadhiraj Panigrahi (INC)
  - MP: Malvika Devi (BJP)

Area
  - Total: 16 km^{2} (6.2 sq mi)
- Elevation: 226 m (741 ft)

Population (2018)
  - Total: 18,087
  - Density: 1,100/km^{2} (2,900/sq mi)

Languages
  - Official: Odia, English
- Time zone: UTC+5:30 (IST)
- PIN: 766107
- Telephone code: 06671
- Vehicle registration: OD-26
- Website: odisha.gov.in

Khariar (also called Khadial, Rajkhariar and Rajakhariar) is a town and a Notified Area Council in Nuapada District of the Indian state of Odisha.

== History ==
The region of Khariar was under the rule of the Chauhan dynasty of Patna State which was established by Ramai Deva of the Chauhan dynasty in the 14th century CE who were vassals of the Eastern Ganga dynasty which was declining following invasions from the northern part of the Indian subcontinent. The Chauhan reign from Patnagarh continued over the region and later expanded through the establishment of their cadet branches extending their rule over areas of Western Odisha and eastern Chhattisgarh. In 1600 CE, Raja Gopal Rai who belonged to the Chauhan family of Balangir was crowned as the first king of Khariar. This led to the formation of the Khariar zamindari that remained until India's independence in 1947.

== Economy ==
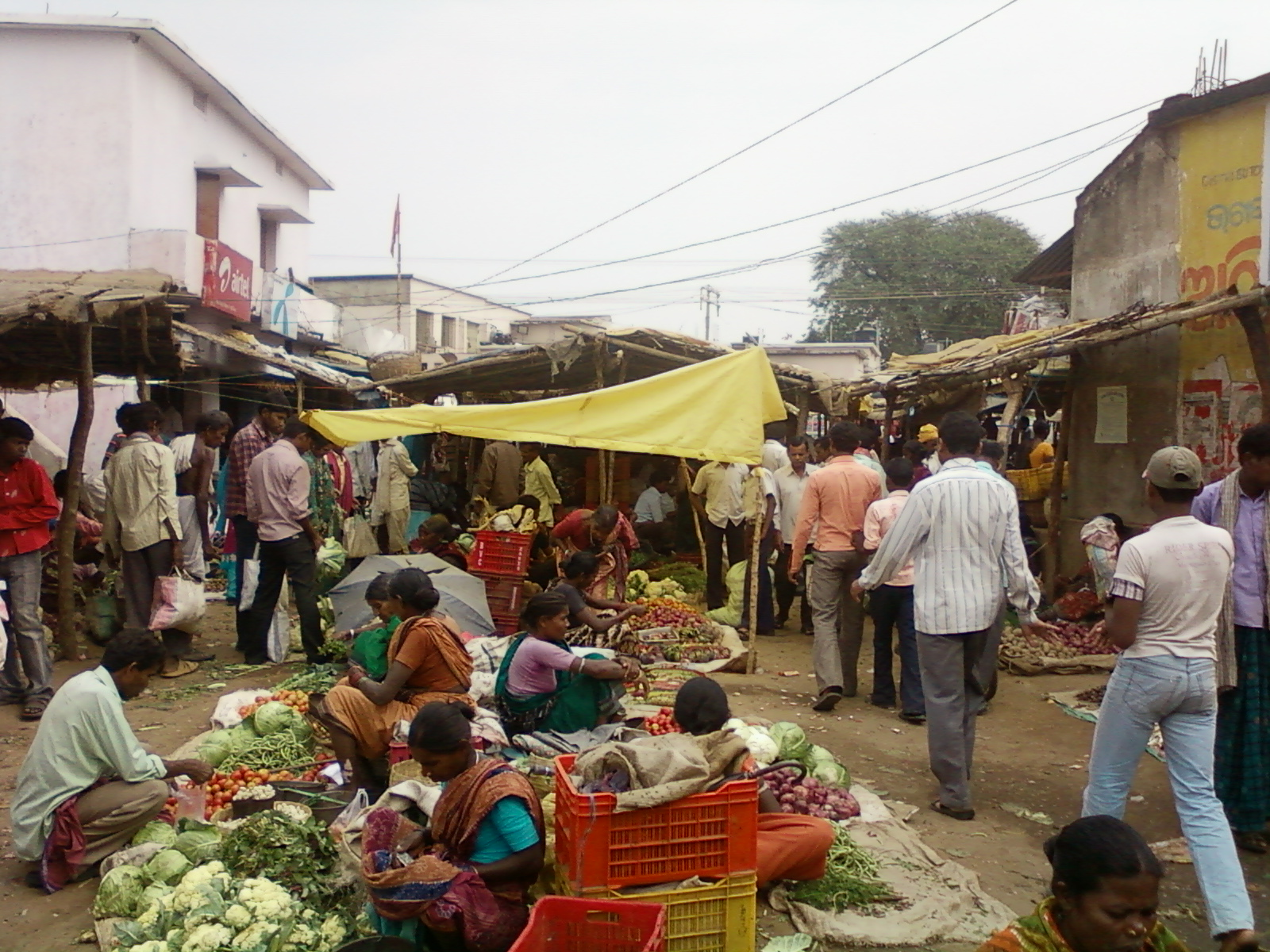
Khariar Old Daily Market

Nuapada district is located in western part of Western Odisha and Khariar is located in the middle of the Nuapada district. Khariar is one of the major towns in Nuapada district and the main business centre in the locality. It has a daily market and a weekly bazaar which takes place every Friday.

== Geography ==
Khariar town is located at 20.28°N 82.77°E. It has an average elevation of 226 m (741 ft). It is located in the western part of Odisha, close to the border of Raipur District, Chhattisgarh. It comes under a rain shadow belt. It belongs to the Mahanadi basin the Eastern Ghats where mountains are interspersed with wide valleys. The climate is tropical with the rainfall is due to the South West monsoon.

== Demographics ==
As of the 2011 Indian census, Khariar has a population of 15,087. Males constitute 51% of the population and females 49%. Khariar has an average literacy rate of 62%, higher than the national average of 59.5%. The male literacy is 72%, and female literacy is 52%. In Khariar, 13% of the population is under 6 years of age.

Odia is the official language of Khariar. English and Hindi is also spoken. Most commonly spoken dialect among people is Sambalpuri Odia.

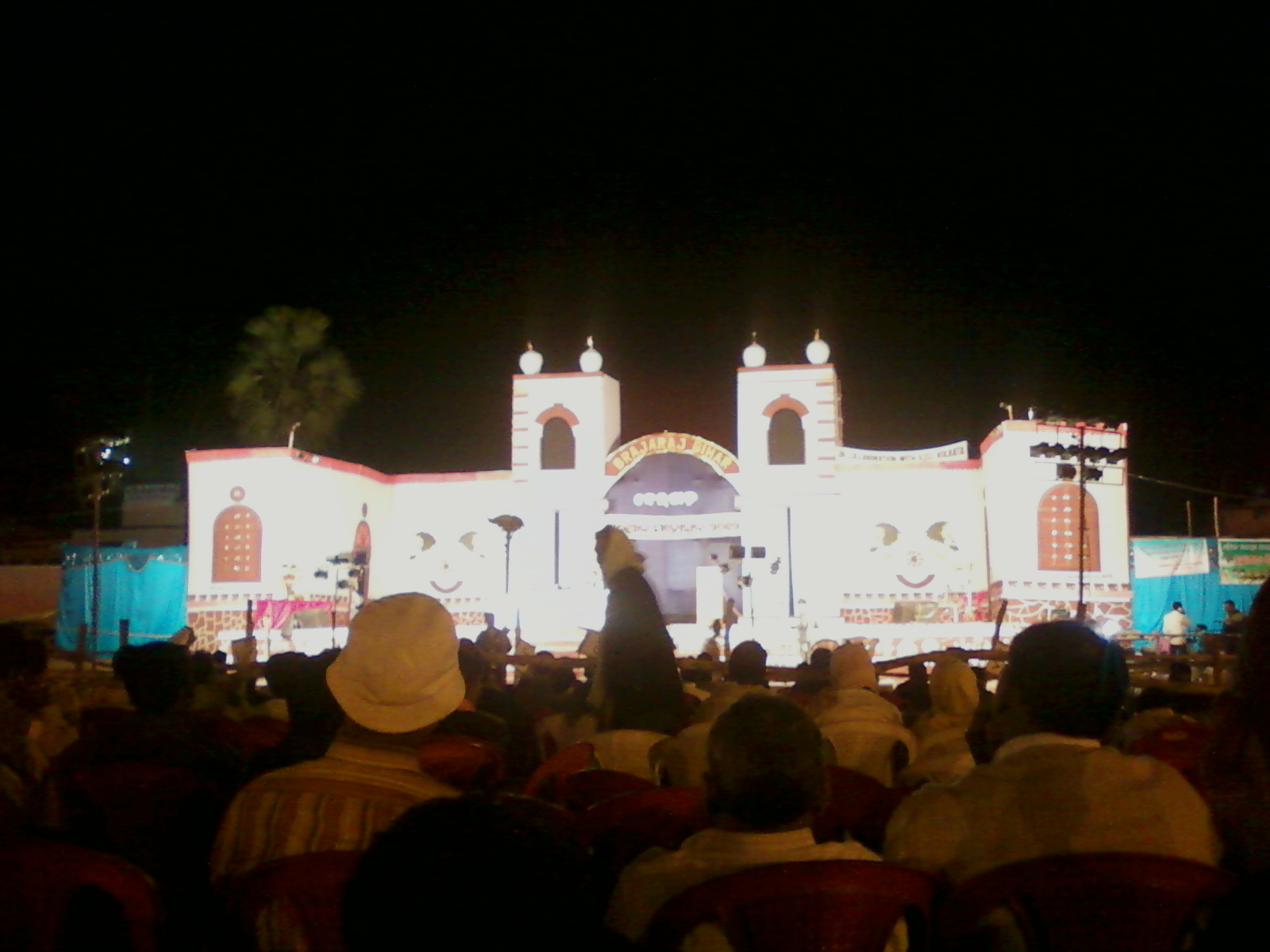
Khariar Mahotsav

== Transportation ==
Khariar is a major transportation hub in Nuapada District as people from the three blocks, namely Boden, Sinapali and Khariar. Though Khariar is not connected by rail, it is well connected by roads. The major roads passing through Khariar are NH 353 (Khariar-Raipur), NH 59 (Khariar-Gopalpur), SH 16 (Khariar-Sambalpur), and SH 44 (Khariar-Bhawanipatna). The nearest rail head is Kantabanji, which is situated 35 km from Khariar. Another nearby railway station is Titlagarh (which is also the hottest place in India). The nearest airport is Raipur Airport, situated 195 kilometres (121 mi) from Khariar.

Khariar is connected by bus via the NH 353 & NH 59. As of 2023, railway line survey work is in progress for the 220-kilometre (140 mi) Kantabanji-Rajkhariar-Ammapani-Nawarangpur-Jeypore route.

=== Nearby towns ===
- Chalanpada, 5 km
- Duajhar, 8 km
- Boden, 28 km
- Komna, 25 km
- Sinapali, 30 km
- Gandabahali, 21 km
- Kantabanjhi, 35 km
- Titlagarh, 50 km
- Nuapada, 70 km
- Balangir, 112 km
- Bhawanipatna, 70 km
- Raipur, 190 km
- New Raipur, 140 km
- Khariar Road, 78 km
- Sambalpur, 240 km
- Bhubaneswar, 430 km
- Kolkata, 838 km
- Brahampur, 338 km
- Tukla, 9 km by nh353

== Religious places ==
There are several religious places of different religions in Khariar. Some of the temples located in Khariar are:

- Maa Dukuribudhi Gudi, Duajhar
- Maa Samaleswari Temple, near Azad Chowk
- Raktambari Mandir, near Azad Chowk
- Hanuman Mandir, near Azad Chowk
- Hanuman Mandir, Puruna Bustand
- Dadhibamana Mandir, Badgudipada
- Sri Sri Radha Krishna Temple Chanabeda
- Jagannath Temple
- Ram Mandir
- Hanuman Mandir, irrigation colony
- Koshaleswar Temple, irrigation colony
- Ganesh Mandir, irrigation colony
- Bhubaneswari Mandir, irrigation colony
- Shiva Temple, Duajhar
- Maa Santoshi Mandir, Junen
- Radha Krishna Mandir, Junen
- Siva Mandir, Tirbandh
- Siva Mandir, Muktasagar
- Gayatri Mandir, Chalanpada
- Radhakrushna Madir, Damapala
- Shri Rameswara Siva Mandir, Bhaludungari
- Shiv Temple, Dalpada

Some of the other religious places of other communities are:

- Mukti Marg Church, Khariar
- Sunni Hanfi Jama Masjid, Khariar
- Sunni Jamat Eidgah, Khariar

== Places of interest ==
=== Tourist destinations ===
There are several tourist spots around Khariar, including:

- Mini Water Dam Project, Duajhar (Salepada) | this is a mini water dam or reservoir located approximately 9 km from khariar
- Patalganga: A spring located approximately 30 km from Khariar which attracts pilgrims from different parts of Nuapada district as well as from neighbouring districts.
- Tikhali Dam: Officially known as the Lower Indra Irrigation Project, this dam is situated 17 km from Khariar.
- Rusi Pitha: Rusipitha (Risipiti) is located in Tukla.
- Jogimatha-Tukla is an old site for the monks near these areas. There we can find the ancient inscriptions of religious monks.
- Ramgarh Hill: A place of worship of Maa Gadiaan, Goddess of Gandabahali village. A large elephant stone is located at this place, and it is considered to be the oldest such stone in the undivided Kalahandi district. According to an ancient belief, Rama's brother Lakshman and wife Sita resided here in their period of exile.

=== Markets ===
- Daily Market (fresh market)
- Goru/Sukrabar Bazar (weekly)
- New Daily Market (near old bus stand)
- Machh Bazaar (old daily market)
- New Machh/Mansh Bazaar (Boden Chowk-Gadramunda area)

== Culture ==
Khariar's culture is a blend of traditional festivals, food, dance etc. Khariar has a cultural heritage that arose due to intermingling of different religions. The major language used is Sambalpuri/ Kosli, which is widely used in each and every part of Khariar region. Nuakhai is the major festival celebrated in this region. The other festivals like Rathayatra, Dusshera, Holi, Diwali, Eid, Christmas, Chindaguda Duajhar (Dhanujatra, Anchalika Sanskrutik Utsav) are also celebrated in Khariar. Khariar organises Khariar Mahotsav every year, which attracts a large number of people from different places.

The activities of this town include running of schools, shops or very small industries and bus communications. Other than these activities, political activities across the town are also common.

== Notable persons ==
- Jitamitra Singh Deo, present titular Raja of Khariar. He is also a poet and historian
- Prayag Dutta Joshi, writer and activist
- Kapil Narayan Tiwari (1929–2022), member of the Odisha Legislative Assembly
