= Prayag Dutta Joshi =

Pandit Prayag Dutta Joshi
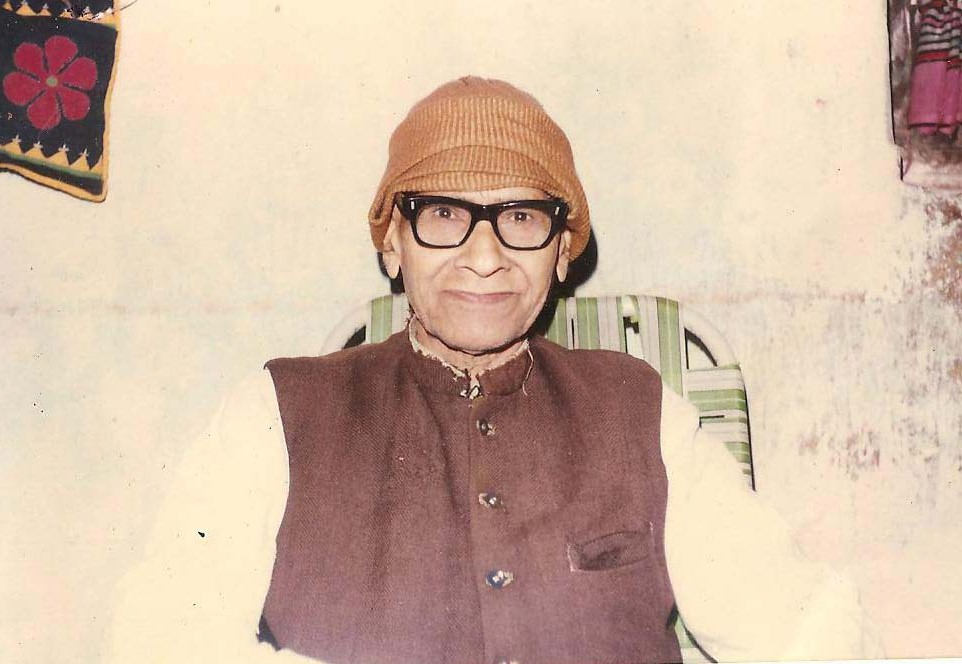
- Kosal Ratna Pandit Prayag Dutta Joshi
- Born: 25 February 1913; Khariar, Nuapada
- Occupation: writer
- Relatives: Shri Chandrasekhar Patjoshi (father); Smt. Brundabati Devi (mother)
- Writing career
- Language: Sambalpuri

Prayag Dutta Joshi was an Indian writer and Sambalpuri language (allegedly also known as Kosli) activist. He was born on 25 February 1913 to Shri Chandrasekhar Patjoshi and Smt. Brundabati Devi in Khariar, Nuapada. He spent his time in Kosal bharti kuria of Khariar.

== Education ==
He studied up to class 8th at Raj Khariar and then went to Raipur for higher studies and completed his matriculation in 1932. He privately studied Ayurveda from 1934 to 1938 in Kashi at Kabiraj Dharamdas Chaukacharya. He was awarded with gold medal for securing the first position in All India level Ayurveda examination held in 1938. During his Kashi days he had authored four volumes of books on Ayurveda in Sanskrit.

== Contribution to Kosli language ==
Prayag Dutta Joshi was the first person to declare the language of western Orissa as an independent language and named it as "Kosli", and declared that:

"ପୁନଃ ପୁନଃ ଘୋସୟାମୀ ପ୍ରସୃନ୍ବନ୍ତୁ ମନିସିଣଃ
ସ୍ଵତନ୍ତ୍ର

— କୋସଲୀ ଭାସା ନୋପ ଭାସା କଦାଚନ"

(Punah punar ghosayami Prasrunwantu manishina, Swatantraa Kosli bhasa, Nopa bhasa kadachana). "Kutek lokar gutek Bhasa Kosli amar Matru Bhasa"was his words that impress the mass to run the Kosli Bhasa Andolan. He is popularly known as 'Kosli bhashar Janak' (Father of Kosli Language) and also as 'Kosal Gaurav'and "KOSAL RATNA".

He also spearheaded the Kosli language movement. Some of his books and articles are:

- Kosli Bhasa ra Ghara Samparkiya Sabdabali - Girijhar Bhawanipatna, November 1984.
- Paschim Odisha ra Bhasa Kosli - Hirakhand Basant Milan Souvenir, January 1985.
- Aaji O Kali ra Oriya Bhasa -Dainik Hirakhand, 1 February 1985.
- Kosli Lok Sahitya Re Rititatwa - Presented at Purbanchaliya Ritisahitya held at Panchayat College Bargarh and published in the souvenir, 25, 26, 27 November 1985.
- Kosal Pradesh ra Maitri Nibandhan - Odisha Sanskrutik Samaj Jayanti Samaroh Souvenir, 1986.
- Swatantra Kosli Bhasa - Dhuan Aru Dhuka - Saptarshi, July 1986.
- Swatantra Kosli Bhasa - Bidwatbimoha - Saptarshi July 1987.
- Swatantra Kosli Bhasa ra Parichay - Saptarshi, March 1988.

A well-known name in Kosli language, literature and movement, he was the first serious scholar who attempted a linguistic study of Kosli language. In fact, it was Joshi, who so emphatically announced that the language of the region was not Odia, but Kosli. Till his death he was not only producing seminal essays on uniqueness of Kosli Bhasa and literature but also promoted many amateur Kosli writers and poets. He was also among those who for the first time in 1986, submitted a memorandum to the President of India to include Kosli under Eighth Schedule. His small booklet Koshali Bhasar Samkhipta Parichay is considered as a sacred text by Kosli writers as well as leaders of the Kosal movement.

Achievements He was felicitated by following organizations: 1979 - Khadial Sahitya Samiti 1980 - Panchapakhuda, Bhawanipatna 1984 - Mahavir Sanskrutik Anusthan, Bhawanipatna 1985 - Hirakhand Basant Milan Samaroh 1986 - Odisha Lekhak Sammukya 1987 - Jadumani Sahitya Sansad, Udaypur, Puri 1988 - Samalpuri Lekhak Sangha 1989 - Orissa Sahitya Academy.
