= Jitamitra Prasad Singh Deo =

Indian historian and archaeologist (1946–2026)

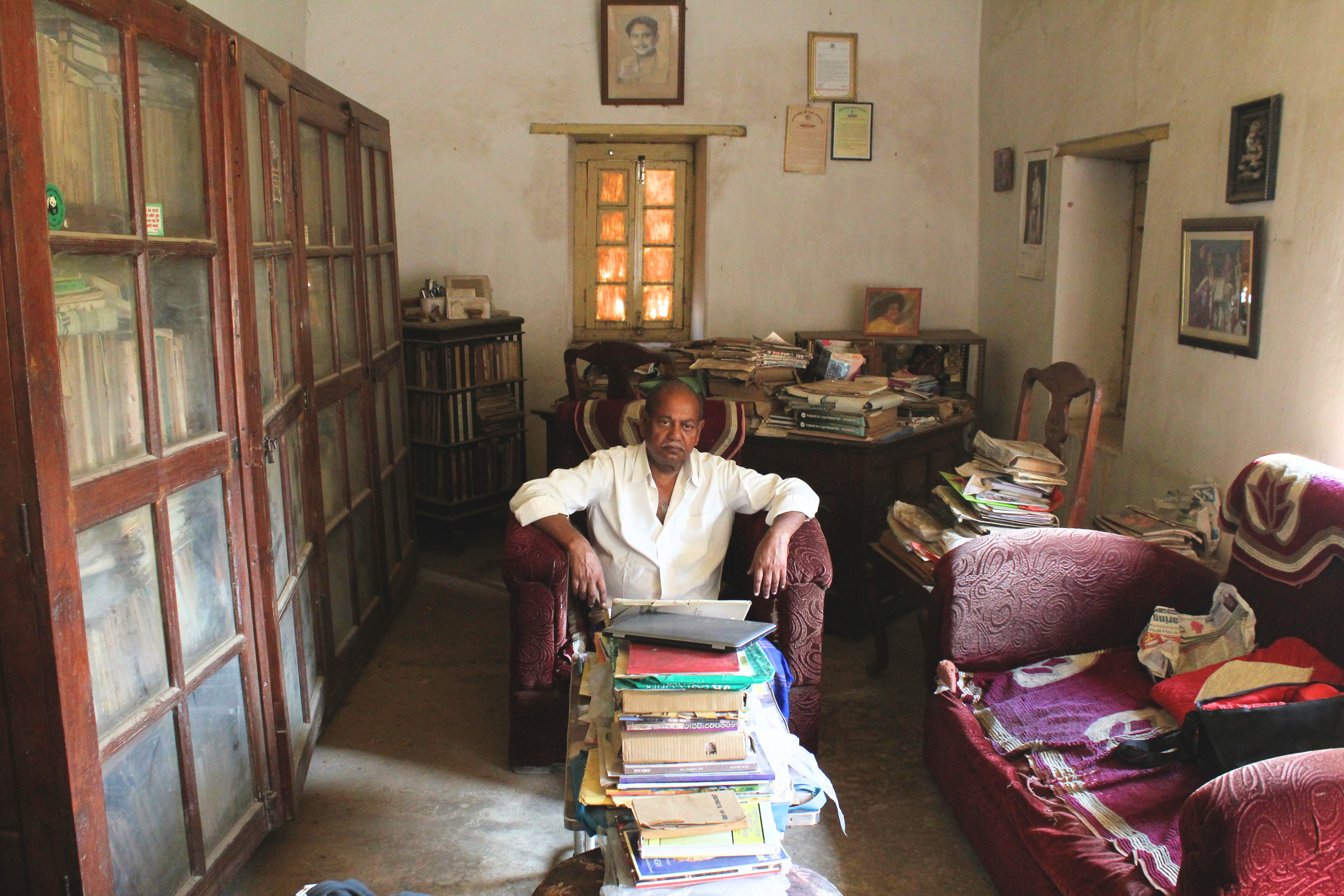
Jitamitra Prasad Singhdeo in his library at Khariar Palace, Nuapada, Odisha in 2018

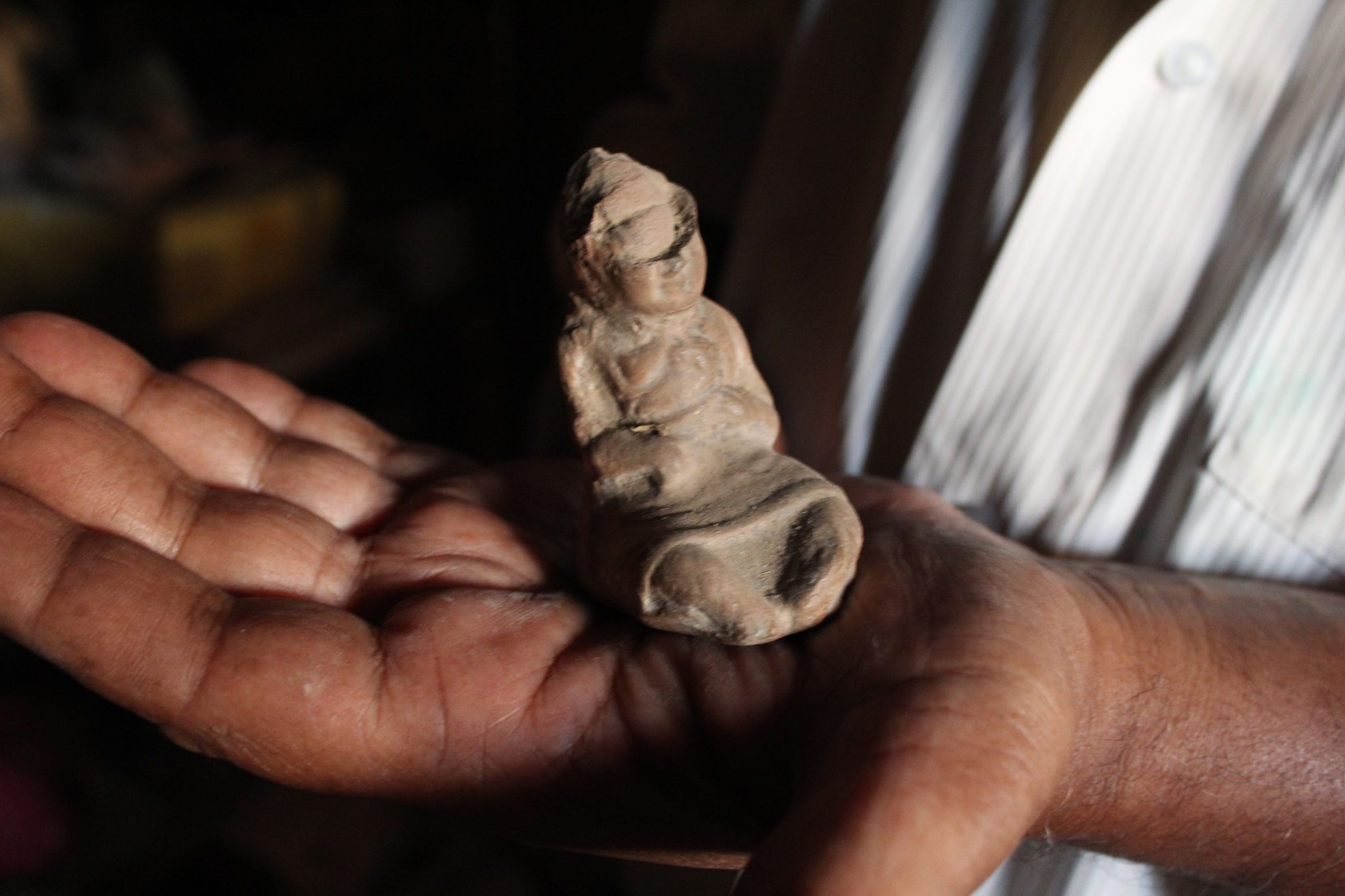
Human figurine dating to 1st century CE being held by Jitamitra Prasad Singhdeo. Find site- Nuapada, Odisha

Jitamitra Prasad Singh Deo (29 August 1946 – 4 January 2026) was an Indian historian and archaeologist from Khariar, Nuapada, Odisha. He was the titular head of the erstwhile zamindari estate of Khariar, born to eight time law maker,a noted author and poet of Odisha Raja Anup Singhdeo and Rani Soubhagya Manjari Devi.

== Education ==
Deo learnt field archaeology and trained under his uncle the late Kalahandi Maharaj Pratap Keshari Deo.

== Career ==
He has been instrumental in documenting the pre-history and ancient history of the Nuapada region and also tribal civil disobedience movements during the struggle for Indian independence in the gadjat hill tracts of Odisha. His research and exploration has helped document rare archaeological finds, tribal customs and ancient riverine trade posts along Odisha's major rivers and establish distinct connections to the larger South East Asia region and Western Odisha. He had been instrumental in the preservation and publication of the speeches made by Maharaja Sir Rajendra Narayan Bhanja Deo of Kanika made during his term in the Indian Legislative Council.(1916-1920) and also of the Utkal Sammilani

He was the president of Khariar Sahitya Samiti. He authored several books on Odisha, and discovered the pre-historic rock art of Yogimath Donger, the Ghat Ghumar rock art copper plates, gold coins of the Sharabhapuriya dynasty, a clay seal, a stone seal of Panduvamshi dynasty, Kalachuri coins, terracotta artefacts, and beads and sculptures of various types depicting human and animal figures with some having red ochre finish.

Deo has also contributed towards the research about the origins of the Jagannath deity with an indepth study on the myth, mystique and historical evidence of the origin of Jagannath. Which go counter to the traditional beliefs but reveal the little known side of deity's origins.

== Personal life and death ==
Jitamitra Prasada Deo was married to Rajshree Devi of the Puri royal family and a noted social worker, philanthrophist and agriculturalist herself. Together they have two songs and a daughter, Deo passed away on 4 January 2026, at the age of 79.

== Selected works ==
- Cultural Profile of South Kosala, Gyan books, Delhi, 2012 ISBN 8121200954
- Origin of Jagannath Deity, Giyan Books, Delhi, 1991 ISBN 812120352X
- Tantric Art of Odisha
- Fic, Victor M. (2003). The tantra: its origin, theories, art, and diffusion from India to Nepal, Tibet, Mongolia, China, Japan, and Indonesia. Abhinav Publications. p. 69. ISBN 978-81-7017-424-0.
- Character Assassination in Modern History of Orissa.
