= Bargaon, Odisha =

Bargaon ବରଗାଁ Bargaon
- Village
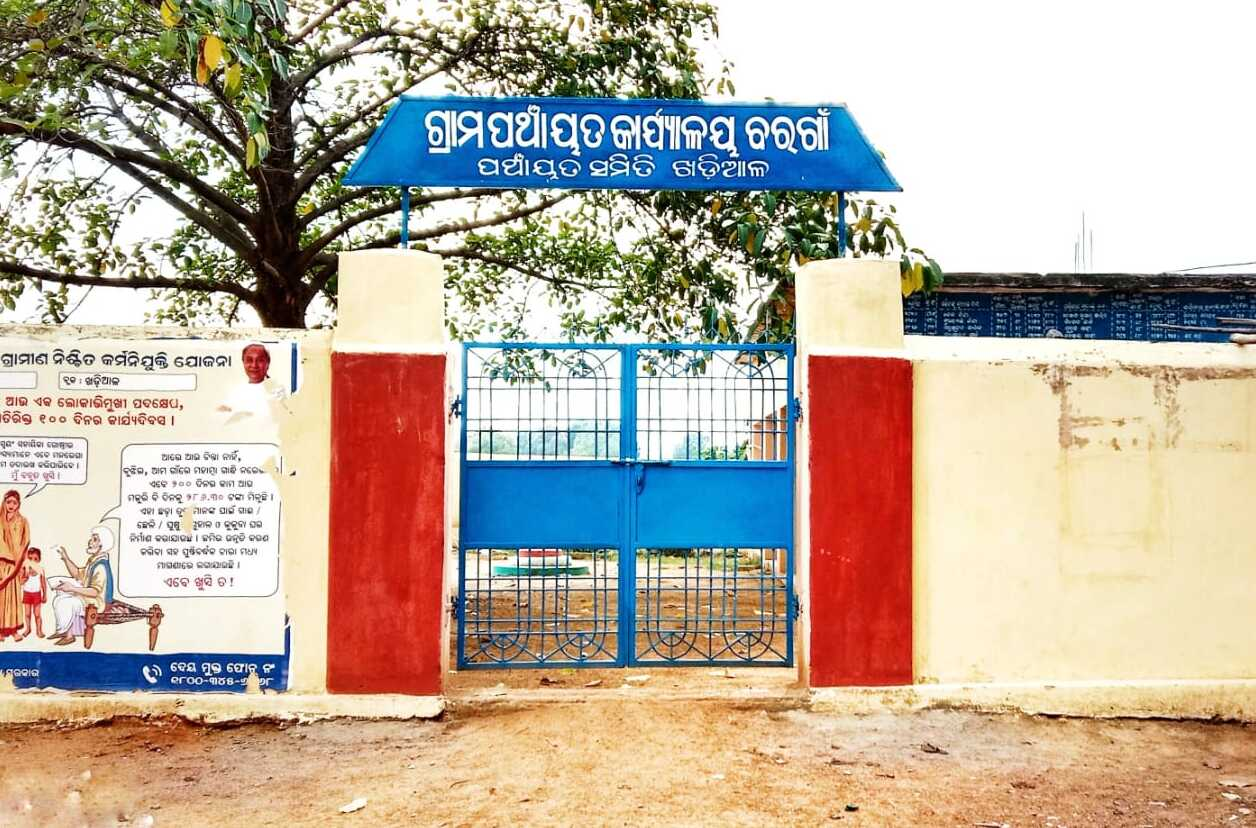
- GramPanchayat Gate
- Nickname: Baragan
- Location in Odisha, India Bargaon (India)
- Coordinates: 20.34°N 82.68°E
- Country: India
- State: Odisha
- District: Nuapada

Government
  - Type: Panchayat
  - Body: Bargaon Panchayat (1952)
  - Sarapanch: Sj. Gobinda Bihari Barik

Area
  - Total: 5 km^{2} (1.9 sq mi)
- Elevation: 252 m (827 ft)

Population (2011)
  - Total: 2,120
  - Density: 420/km^{2} (1,100/sq mi)

Languages
  - Official: Odia
- Time zone: UTC+5:30 (IST)
- PIN: 766107
- Telephone code: 06671
- Geocode: 8MRQ+GX Bargaon, Odisha
- Vehicle registration: OD-26
- Sex ratio: 1000:968 male/female
- Website: odisha.gov.in

Bargaon or Baragan is a village under Khariar tehsil in Nuapada district in the state of Odisha, India. It is situated 10 km away from the sub-district headquarters Khariar and 63 km towards south from district headquarters Nuapada.

The word "Bargaon" is composed of two words: "Bara" means 'Divine' and "gaan" or "gaon" means 'village'. On the 150th birth anniversary of Mahatma Gandhi, the village was recognised as "Lok Kala Gram" of Nuapada district by the Department of Language, Literature, and Culture of the Government of Odisha.

== Economy ==
It has a weekly bazaar that takes place every Tuesday. Most people of Bargaon are middle-class, which includes government employees.

=== Bank ===
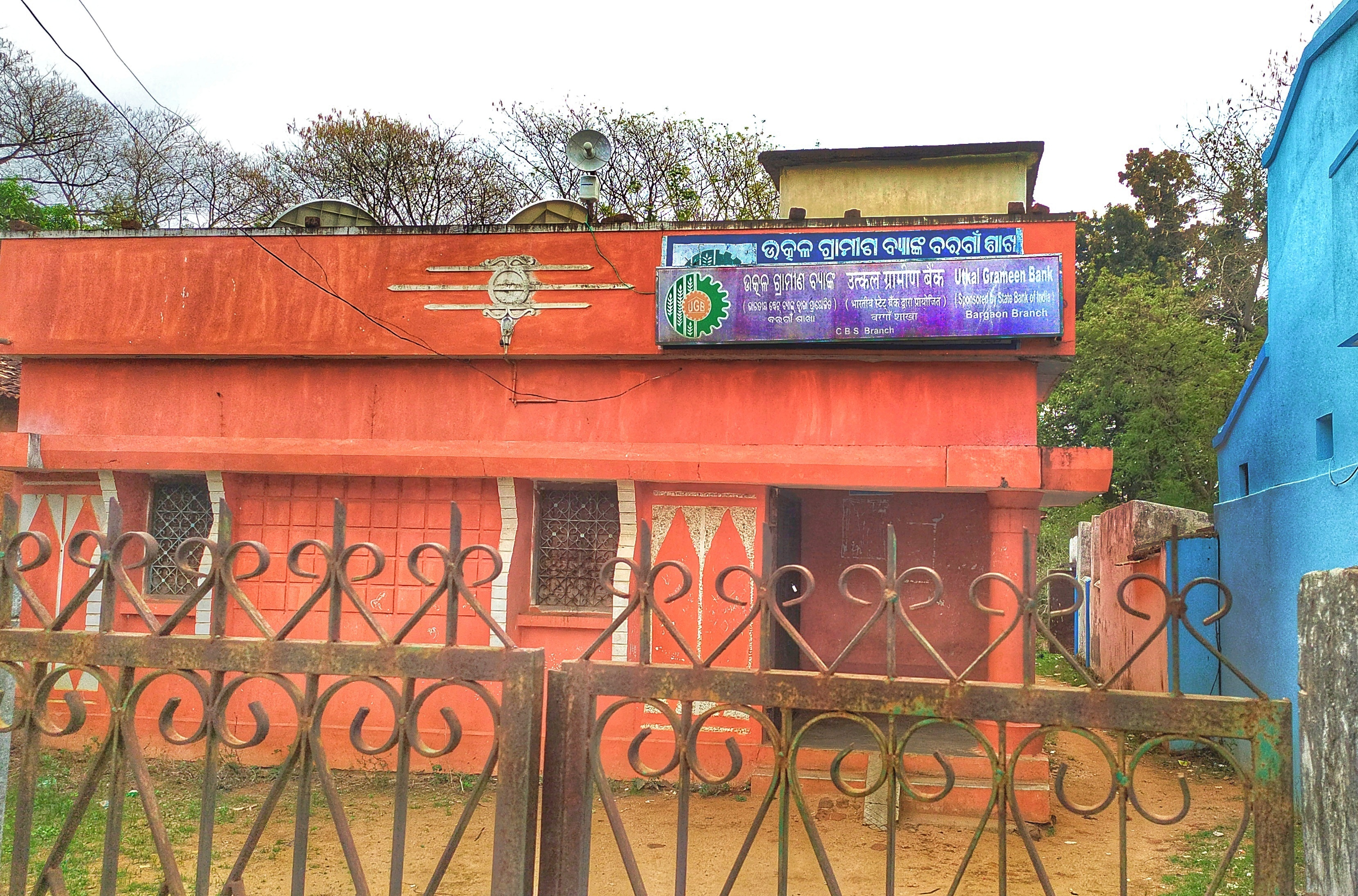
Utkal Grameen Bank

In 1984, a branch of the Kalahandi Anchalik Bank(now known as Utkal Grameen Bank) was established in the village to improve the economic standards of people.

=== Offices ===
There are multiple government offices in the village:

- Post Office
- Panchayat Office
- BARGAON Electrical Sub-Station
- Office of the Revenue Inspector (R.I.)
- BARGAON Indane Gas
- Veterinary and Artificial Breeding Centre
- Primary Agriculture Cooperative Society (PACS) Office

== Healthcare facilities ==
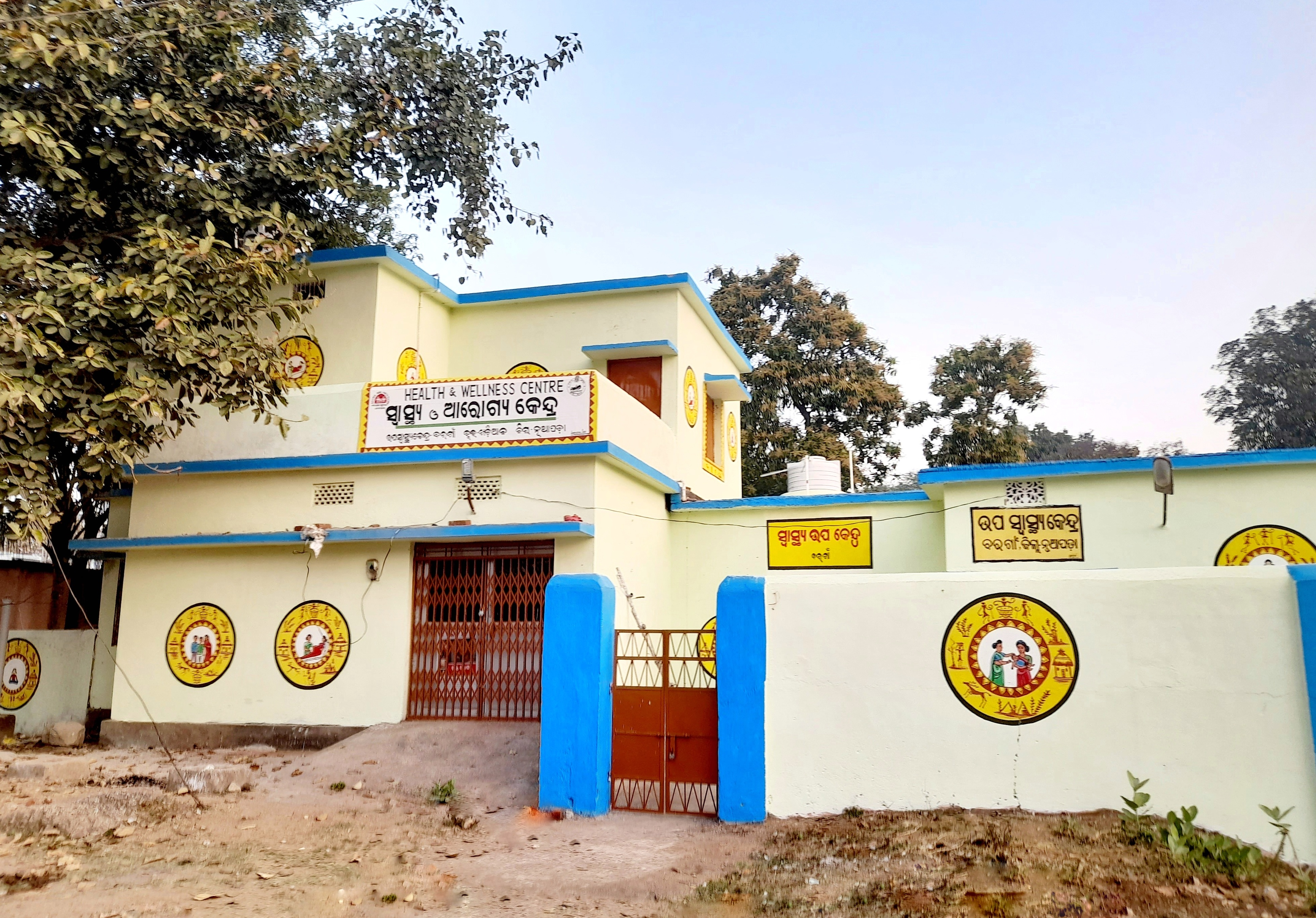
Baragaon HEALTH & WELLNESS Center

Basic health care facilities available in the village.

- Primary Health Centre (PHC)
- Primary Health Sub-centre (PHS)
- Maternity and Child Welfare Centre (MCW)

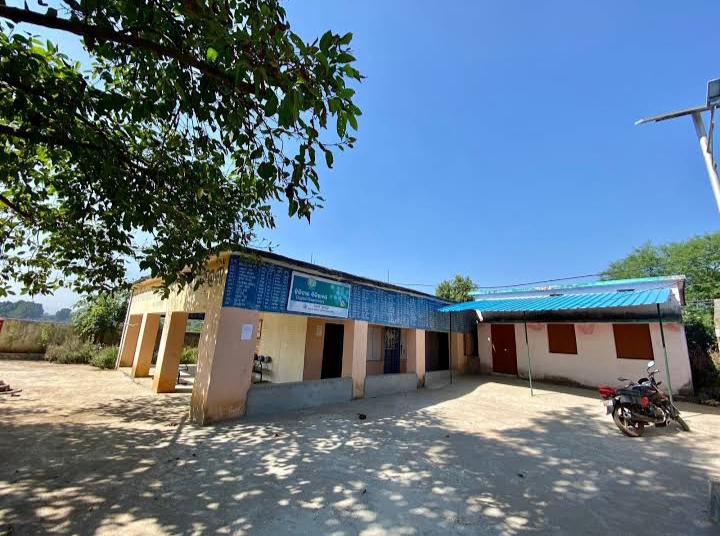
Bargaon Digital Hospital & Dispensary

- BARGAON Digital Hospital & Dispensary

== Geography & Climate ==
Bargaon is a village located within the Nuapada district. It is located at 20.34°N 82.68°E. It has an average elevation of 228 m. The village has an area of 505 hectares. Bargaon comes under a rain shadow belt.

== Places of Interest ==
- Chakadongar: A round-shaped hill is situated in the eastern part of the village. The NH353 passes through the hill. Maa Chakadongren temple is situated here.
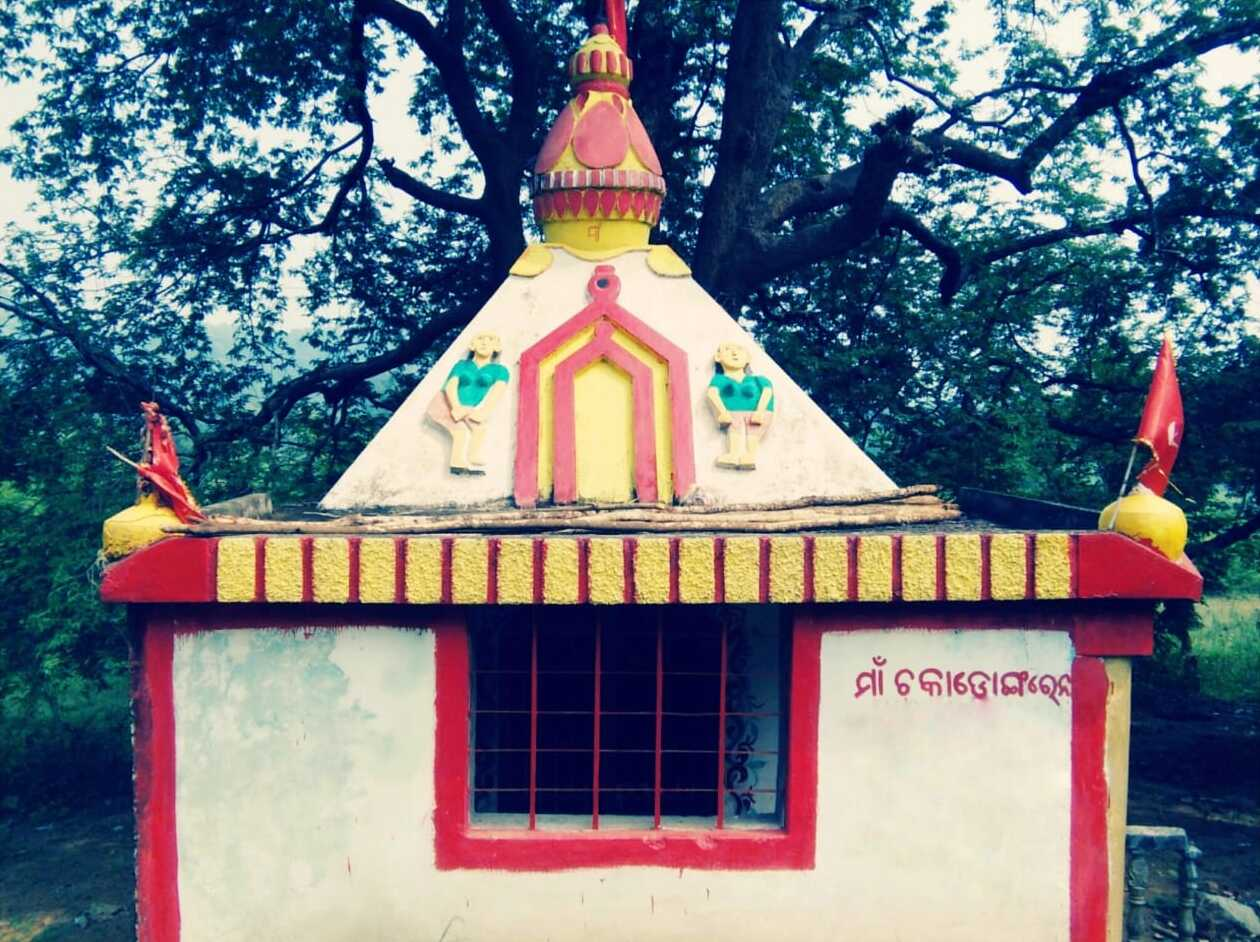
  Jai Maa Chakadongaren
- Teteldongri: Teteldongri and Uddhlu are another hillside situated on the north side of the village. Below the Teteldongri, a pond (called parject) is situated and a minor canal passes nearby.
- Dadhibaman Pokhari: A pond is situated in the northeast part of the village. The people of Bargaon use it for daily baths. Maa Bandhgosen temple is situated at the centre of the pond.
- Sundar River: One of the main tributaries of the Tel River, which flows into the Mahanadi. It is perennial and effluent in nature and maintains sluggish flow during peak summer months. It is also called as The Indra River in several places. Lower Indra Dam or Tikhali Dam is constructed in this river roughly 5 km from Bargaon.

Most of the people of Bargaon and nearby villages depend upon this river for baths as well as for drinks.

== How to Reach ==
The village is well connected with roads to many towns. National Highway 353 passes near the village, which leads to many cities such as Raipur, Mahasamund, Khariar Road, Nuapada, Bhawanipatna, and Rayagada.

The nearest railway station is Kantabanji (40 km), and the nearest railway junction is Titlagarh, which is 60 km away from Bargaon, whereas the nearest airport is located at Raipur (170 km) in Chhattisgarh.

== Demographics ==
As of the 2011 census, the population was 2,120. Of those, 270 of those are under the age of 7, representing 12.74% of the population. The literacy rate within the village is estimated at 67.41%. Odia is the local language of the people here.

== Education ==
There are a few government and private schools in the village.

=== Nursery Education ===
There are five Anganwadi Centres functioning in Bargaon for all-round development of the children.

=== Primary Education ===
Primary educators have been working in the village since 1918.

Bargaon Centre Primary School is one of the oldest schools of the undivided Kalahandi district. Other schools in the village are:

- Centre Primary School: The school was established in 1918. It is situated at the centre of the village. About 102 batches have successfully passed from this school.
- Sabarpada Project Primary School: The school was established in 2002 under the Project of District Primary Education Programme (DPEP), Govt. Of Odisha.
- Kamajori Project Primary School: The school was established in 2007 and is managed by the Department of School & Mass Education, Govt. Of Odisha.
- Bendrabahal Primary School: Bendrabahal Primary School was established in 1966 on the right side of the main road to Bargaon.
- Bargaon U.P./ME School, Bargaon: It was established in 1957 and is managed by the Deptartment of School and Mass Education, Govt. of Odisha. Odia is the medium of instruction in the school. The school has a well and a library. In the year 2017, the school was merged with the Jai Kishan High School, Bargaon.

=== Secondary & Higher Education ===
For Secondary & Higher Education, there is a Government Higher Secondary School named,

- Jai Kishan High School, Bargaon was established in 1972 by the natives of Bargaon. Later on, the Government of Odisha took over the responsibility of the school. It provides education to both boys and girls from class 6th to class 12th (+2). Both Red Cross and Bharat Scouts & Guides (BSG) are functioning in the school.

== Religious Place ==
There are 4 Shiv temples in the village. Besides these, there are some Devi mandirs also present in the village. Chakadongren and Bandhgosen are worshipped as the village goddess.

== Festivals and rituals ==
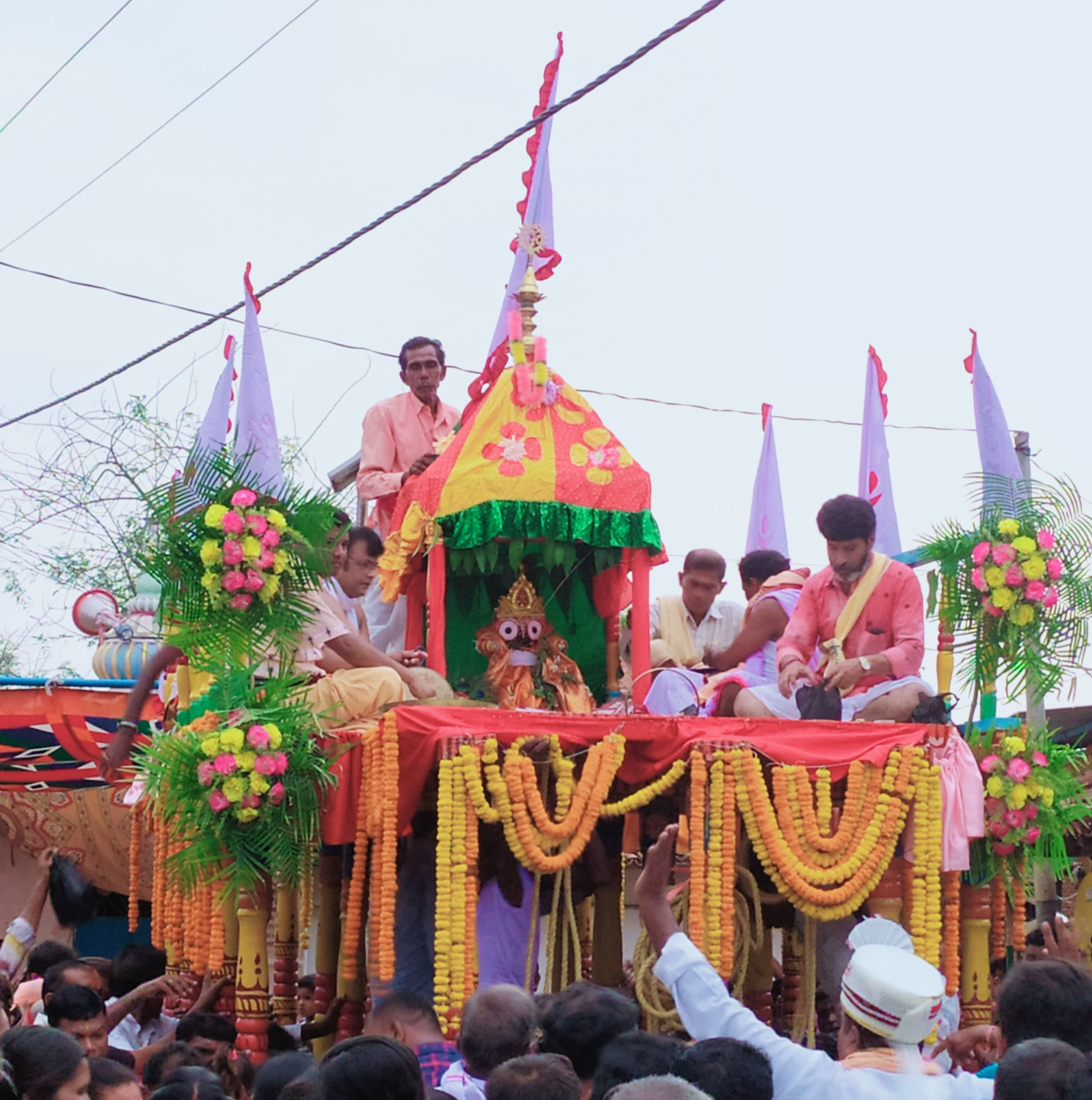
Bargaon Rathyatra 2023

Many festivals are celebrated in the village. These include:

- Rathyatra: The largest Hindu chariot festival of Odisha is also celebrated in Bargaon each year during the month of July.

During the festival, the chariot of Jagannath is drawn by a huge number of devotees from the Bargaon Jagannath Temple to Bendrabahal Gundicha Temple, where the deity resides there for a week and then returns back to the village. The day of the return of the deity is called Bahuda Jatra.

- Durga Puja: It is one of the major festivals or Puja celebrated in the village every year. The festival is observed in the month Ashwina, every year. The festival started in the year 1982 and continues to be celebrated.
- Shivaratri: It is another festival celebrated in Bargaon every year. It is celebrated in honor of Shiva. It has been celebrated in the village since 1990.
- Shri Shri Basant Madhumangal Raasleela: The most important festival is Raasleela, celebrated every year in the month January or February. It is the festival of Shri Krishna, celebrated for eight days. Some children and some adults play the role of different characters such as Krishna, Balaram, Madhumangal, Sudam, Subal, Dashi, and Shakhi. Kokolila is the most popular night of Raasleela, it is generally celebrated on the third night of the festival. Since 1889, it has been celebrated every year in the village.

Some other national and regional festivals are also celebrated in the village. They include Holi, Diwali, Nuakhai, Puspuni, Ganesha Puja, and Gaja Laxmi Puja.
