= Nuapada district =

- District of Odisha
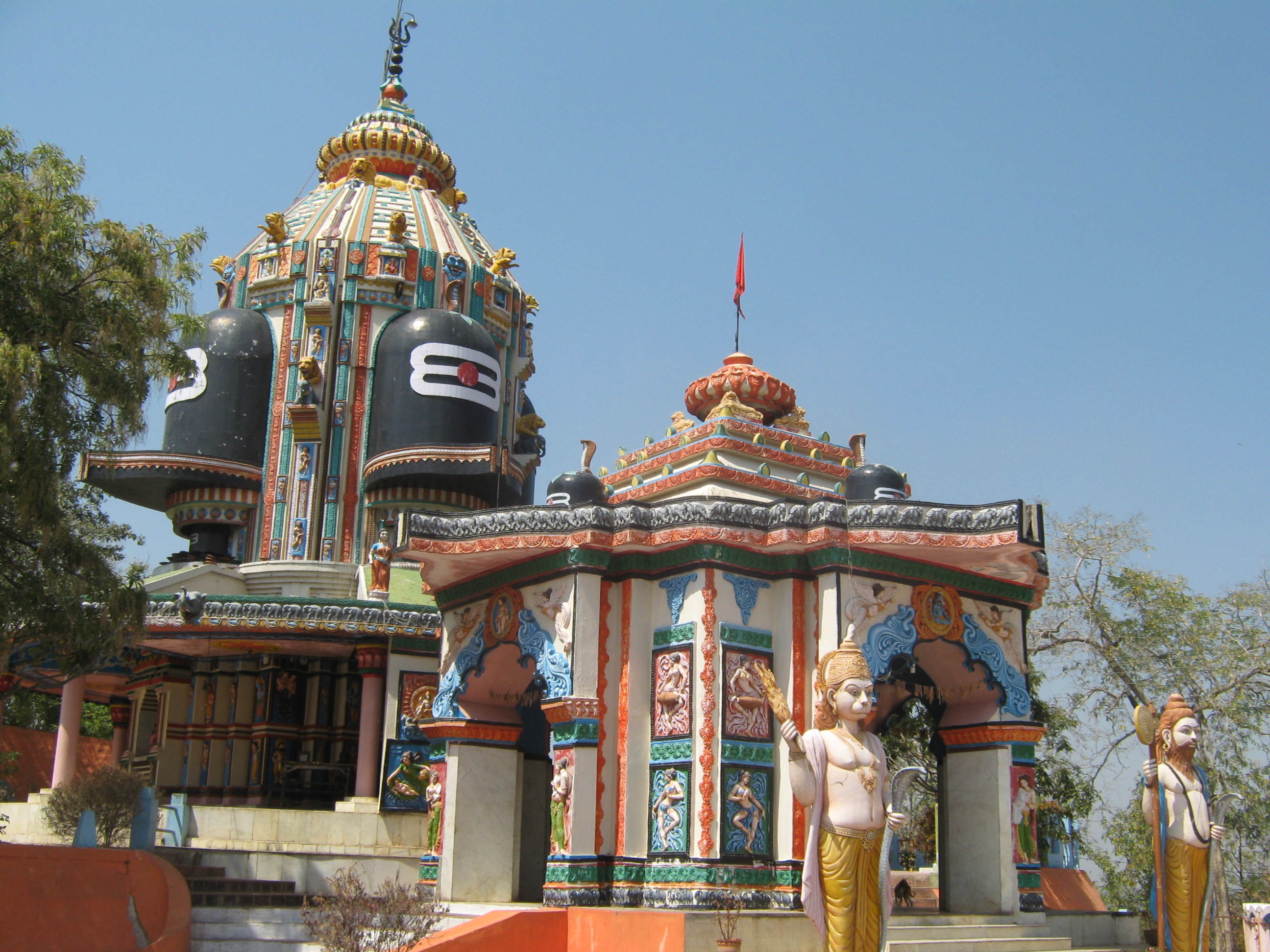
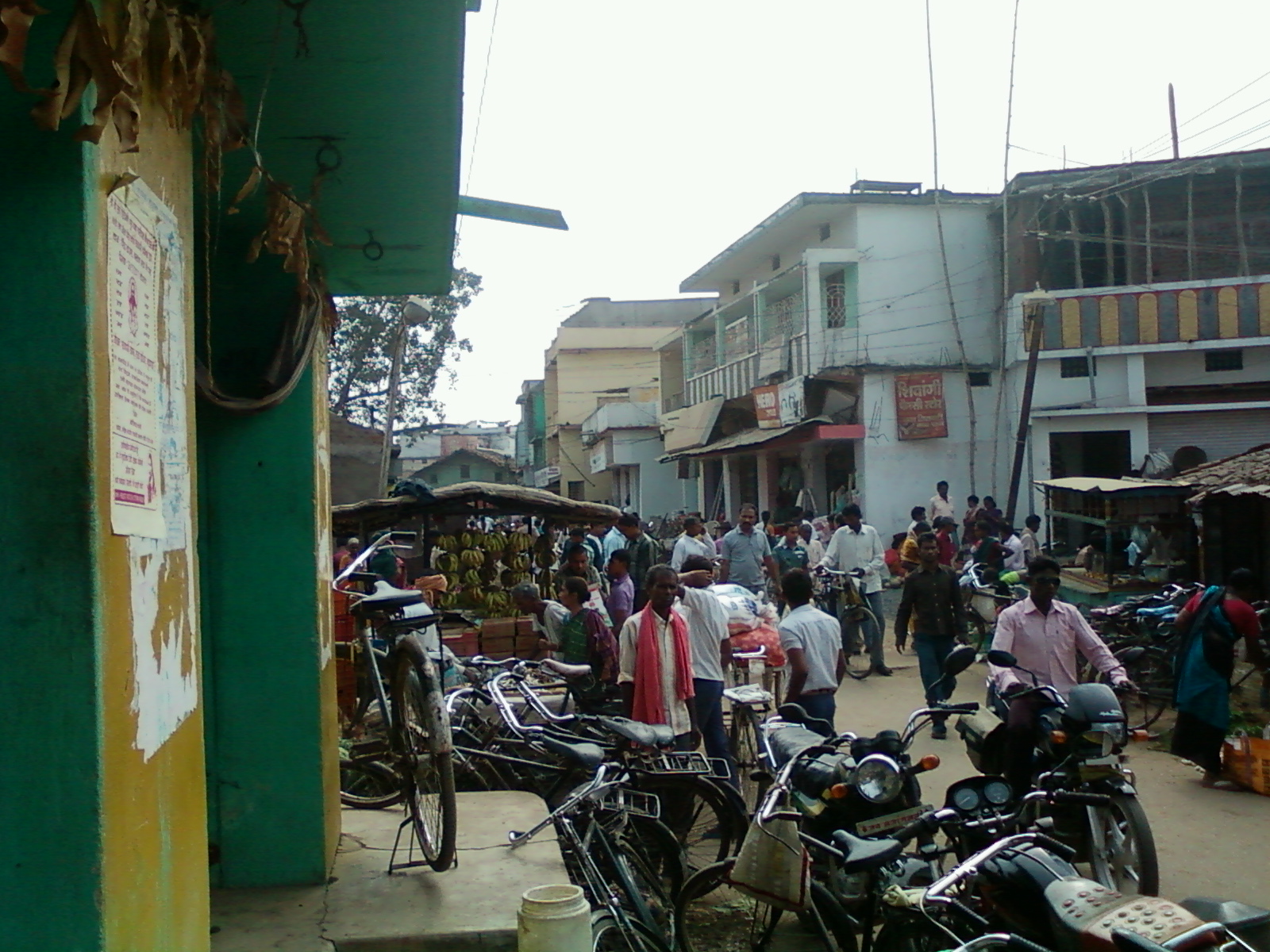
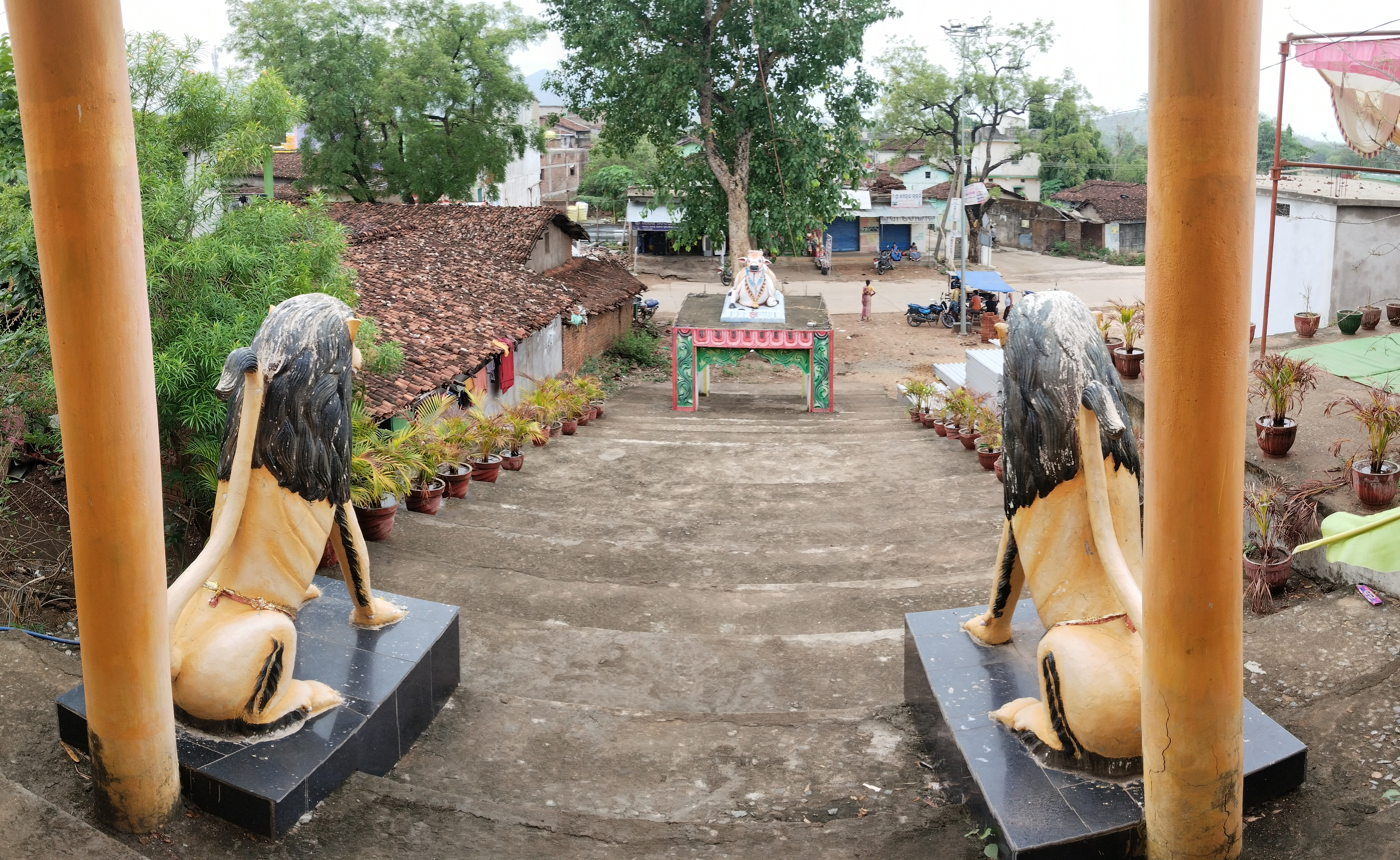
- Top: Yogeswar Temple, Patora; Middle: Street Market, Khariar; Bottom: Shiv Temple, Gandabahali

- Location in Odisha
- Coordinates: 20.65°N 82.833°E
- Country: India
- State: Odisha
- Established: 27 March 1993
- Founder: Ghasiram Majhi
- Headquarters: Nuapada

Government
  - Collector & District Magistrate: Madhusudan Dash, IAS
  - Divisional Forest Officer: Khushwant Singh, IFS
  - Superintendent of Police: Gundala Reddy Raghavendra IPS

Area
  - Total: 3,408 km^{2} (1,316 sq mi)

Population (2011)
  - Total: 610,382
  - Density: 157/km^{2} (410/sq mi)

Languages
  - Official: Odia, English
- Time zone: UTC+5:30 (IST)
- PIN: 766105
- Vehicle registration: OD-26
- Sex ratio: 1020 ♂/♀
- Literacy: 58.20%
- Lok Sabha constituency: Kalahandi
- Vidhan Sabha constituency: 2: 071-Nuapada 072-Khariar
- Climate: Aw (Köppen)
- Precipitation: 1,230 millimetres (48 in)
- Website: www.nuapada.nic.in

Nuapada district is located in the Odisha state in India, with the town of Nuapada serving as the headquarters of the district. It has one subdivision: Nuapada, and five blocks: Khariar, Sinapali, Boden, Komna, and Nuapada. Nuapada District has three Notified Area Councils: Khariar, Khariar Road, and Nuapada, six tehsils in addition to villages, such as Gandabahali, Tukla, Hatibandha, Duajher, Bargaon, Tarbod, Udyanbandh, Singjhar, Brahmanpada, Karngamal, Sarabong, Dharambandha, Lakhna, Sunabeda, Beltukri, Bhela, Niljee, and Larka etc.

== History ==
The district of Nuapada was a part of Kalahandi district until early March 1993, but for administrative convenience, Kalahandi District was divided into two parts — Kalahandi and Nuapada vide State Government Notification No. DRC-44/93/14218/R dated 27 March 1993. Nuapada District now comprises one sub-division Nuapada, six tehsils (Nuapada, Komana, Khariar, Sinapalli, Boden and jonk) and five community development blocks (Khariar, Sinapalli, Boden, Nuapada and Komna).It is believed that the District of Kalahandi formed in ancient time a part of Mahakantara territory. During 4th century CE, when Samudra Gupta led his campaign through this region a king named Vyaghraraja was ruling over Mahakantara. After Vyaghraraja, the Nala kings like Bhavadatta Varman, Arthapati and Skanda Varman ruled over this region up to about 500 CE.

In the 6th century CE a new kingdom developed in the Kalahandi tract under King Tustikara, but very little is known about other kings of his family. The Nuapada area was by that time under the kings of Sarabhapuriya dynasty whose copper plate record and gold coins are available. This region came under the occupation of the Somavamsis of South Kosala during the 8th century CE when Mahaivagupta Balarjuna was ruling from his headquarters at Sripur.

In the 9th century CE when the Somavamsis were ousted from the Sripur region and organized a new kingdom in Sonepur-Sambalpur tract, the Kalahandi portion continued to be under their rule. In fact, Mahabhabagupta Janamejaya occupied the Trikalinga territory (Koraput area) through Kalahandi. In the middle of the 10th century CE the Somavamsi dominion embraced the whole of Orissa under Yayati II Mahasivagupta. His son Udyotakesari divided this dominion and placed the western part (Kosala) under the rule of a collateral branch. Kalahandi was included in the Kosala kingdom the capital of which was Jajatinagar near Sonepur.

The rule of the Somavamsis in Kosala collapsed by the invasion of Rajendra Chola in 1022 CE and after that the territory came under the rule of the Telugu Cholas. In 1038 CE Vajrahasta V of Eastern Ganga dynasty became powerful in Parlakhemundi region and after the death of Rajendra Chola in 1044 CE he assumed independence and occupied the hilly territory including Koraput and Kalahandi.

The Gangas ruled over Kalahandi for a long period. The stone inscription at Narla reveals that one Madanamahadeva was ruling over Kamalmandala in 1231 CE apparently as a feudatory of the Gangas. Tradition preserved by the Durbar of Kalahandi reveals that the Nagas commenced their rule in Kalahandi from Vikram sambat 1062 or CE 1005. If the tradition is to be believed it may be said that the Nagas ruled over Kamalmandala as feudatories of the Gangas till 14th century CE after which they owed allegiance to the Suryavamshi Gajapatis.

It is not known when Kamalmandala became known as Kalahandi. The earliest reference to the name Kalahandi is found in the Dadhivaman temple inscription dated in Yugabda 4819, i.e., CE 1718. In British records this territory was called Karond. This territory assumed independence after the downfall of the Gajapatis of Orissa in 1568 CE According to tradition the Kalahandi kingdom commanded sovereign power over eighteen garhs before it was occupied by the Bhonsles of Nagpur in the middle of the 18th century CE In 1803 when the Marathas were defeated by the British and the coastal regions of Orissa as well as the Patna-Sambalpur group of states came under the British, Kalahandi, very probably, continued under the Marathas. The Patna-Sambalpur group was subsequently restored to Raghujee Bhonsla II in 1806. The Marathas of Nagpur became subordinate to British power after the Third Anglo-Maratha War in 1818. But Kalahandi continued to be under Maratha rule till 1853, when the Nagpur state lapsed to the British Crown as Raghuji III died without an heir. The Chauhans were ruling over Khariar since about the time of Rama Deo, the first Chauhan king of Patna. In 1590 CE Gopal Ray, a scion of the Patna family became the king of Khariar and started a line of semi-independent kings in that territory. Khariar came under the Marathas in 1741 CE and the British occupied it in 1818. In 1905 when the District of Sambalpur and some feudatory states including Kalahandi were amalgamated with Orissa Division of Bengal, the Government of the Central Provinces opposed merger of Khariar with Sambalpur and in 1906 Khariar became a part of the Mahasamund tehsil. When the separate province of Orissa was formed in 1936, Khariar was added to Orissa and was made a sub-division (Nuapada sub-division) of Sambalpur District. On 1 January 1948, Kalahandi along with other feudatory states of Orissa except Mayurbhanj, merged with Orissa and on that date the new District of Kalahandi was formed with the ex-states of Kalahandi, Patna and Sonepur. On 1 November 1949, Patna and Sonepur together constituted a separate District and the Nuapada sub-division of Sambalpur was added to the District of Kalahandi.

== Geography ==
Nuapada district is in the western part of Odisha, lying between latitude 20° 0' N and 21° 5' and between longitude 82° 20' E and 82° 40' E. Its boundaries extend in the north, west and south to Mahasamund district in Chhattisgarh and in the east to Bargarh, Balangir and Kalahandi districts. The district has an area of 3407.5 km^{2} and the administrative headquarters is located at Nuapada.

The plains of Nuapada subdivision are fringed by rugged hill ranges stretching southward, which belong to the main line of the Eastern Ghats and contain extensive plateaus of about 4000 ft (1200 m) in elevation.

== Economy ==
Due to the conspicuous absence of any industry, the economy revolves around agricultural activities. Three major irrigation projects — the Upper Jonk, the Sunder dam, and the upcoming Lower Indira Irrigation Project — provide support to 45,000 acres of land. Rice is the main crop in the entire district. Other crops like corn (maize), cotton, and onion make up a major share of crops under cultivation. More than 10,000 households migrate to other states in search of better employment opportunities every year after the harvesting season is over. Though the district is tops in MGNREGS implementation, the advance provided by labor contractors before Nuakhai festival lure ignorant laborers into the plot. Due to unregistered and uninformed migration, protection of migrant laborers has become a challenge to the government. In 2006, the Ministry of Panchayati Raj named Nuapada one of the country's 250 most backward districts (out of a total of 640). it is one of the 19 districts in Odisha currently receiving funds from the Backward Regions Grant Fund Programme (BRGF).

== Demographics ==
Historical population
Year	Pop.	±% p.a.
1901	122,559	—
1911	147,489	+1.87%
1921	150,180	+0.18%
1931	178,787	+1.76%
1941	203,379	+1.30%
1951	219,850	+0.78%
1961	267,272	+1.97%
1971	338,894	+2.40%
1981	392,683	+1.48%
1991	469,482	+1.80%
2001	530,690	+1.23%
2011	610,382	+1.41%

Religions in Nuapada district (2011)
Religion	Percent
Hinduism	98.48%
Islam	0.81%
Other or not stated	0.71%

In the 2011 Indian census, Nuapada district had a population of 610,382. roughly equal to the nation of Solomon Islands or the US state of Wyoming. This gives it a ranking of 524th in India (out of a total of 640). The district has a population density of 157 inhabitants per square kilometre (410/sq mi). Its population growth rate over the decade 2001–2011 was 14.28%. Nuapada has a sex ratio of 1020 females for every 1000 males, and a literacy rate of 58.2%. 4.99% of the population lives in urban areas. Scheduled Castes and Scheduled Tribes make up 13.46% and 33.80% of the population respectively.

Languages of Nuapada district (2011)
1. Odia (58.0%)
2. Sambalpuri (23.7%)
3. Chhattisgarhi (15.0%)
4. Hindi (1.68%)
5. Others (1.54%)

At the time of the 2011 census, 58.02% of the population in the district spoke Odia, 23.72% Sambalpuri, 15.04% Chhattisgarhi and 1.68% Hindi as their first language.

== Politics ==
=== Vidhan Sabha constituencies ===
Nuapada district is part of Kalahandi Lok Sabha constituency. The MP of Kalahandi is Malvika Devi from the BJP.

The following are the two Vidhan Sabha constituencies of Nuapada district and the elected members of that area.

== Major cities, towns, and villages ==
- Nuapada
- Khariar
- Khariar Road
- Sinapali
- Komna
- Boden
- Gandabahali

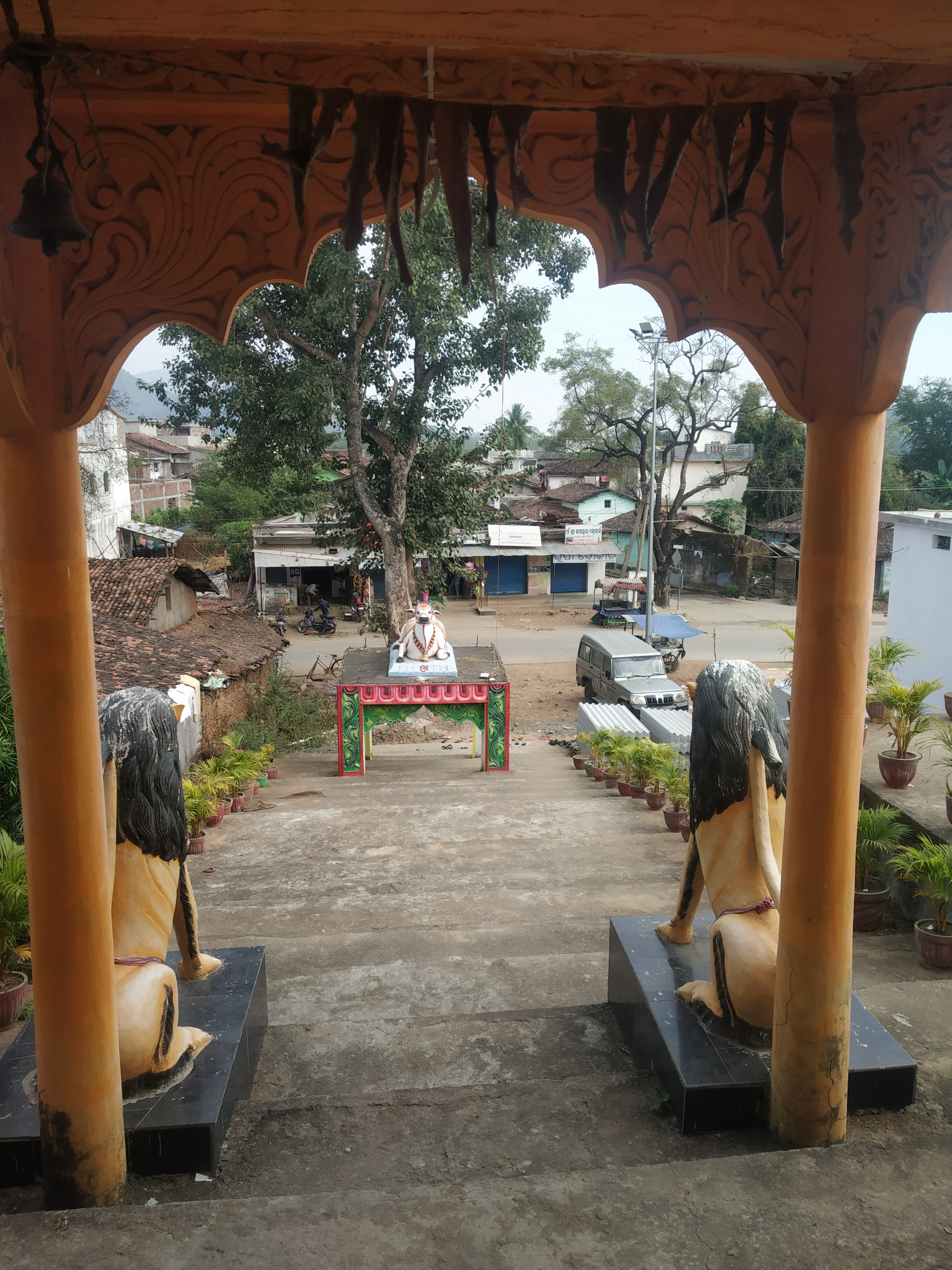
Shiv Temple, Gandabahali

- Hatibandha
- Brahmanpada, Nuapada
- Tukula
- Udyanbandha

== Notable people ==
- Rajendra Dholakia Hon’ble Member of Legislative Assembly from Nuapada
- Duryodhan Majhi former Cabinet Minister Government of Odisha and former Member of Legislative Assembly Khariar
- Basanta Kumar Panda Former Member Parlament Lok Sabha from Kalahandi
- Prayash Singh Indian Cricketers
- Adhiraj Mohan Panigrahi Hon’ble Member of Legislative Assembly from Khariar
- Jitamitra Singh Deo, Present Titular Raja of Khariar. He is also a Poet and Historian
- Prayag Dutta Joshi, Writer And Activist
- Kapil Narayan Tiwari (1929–2022), Member of the Odisha Legislative Assembly from Khariar
- Hitesh Kumar Bagartti former Member of Legislative Assembly from Khariar
- Jay Dholakia Hon'ble Member of Legislative Assembly from Nuapada
