= Hatibandha =

City in Odisha, India

- Town
- Location in Odisha, India Hatibandha (India)
- Coordinates: 22.1916°N 84.8669°E
- Country: India
- State: Odisha
- District: Sundargarh

Population (2001)
  - Total: 9,296

Languages
  - Official: Odia
- Time zone: UTC+5:30 (IST)
- Vehicle registration: OD
- Website: odisha.gov.in

Hatibandha is a census town in Sundargarh district in the Indian state of Odisha.

== Demographics ==
As of 2001 India census, Hatibandha had a population of 9296. Males constitute 53% of the population and females 47%. Hatibandha has an average literacy rate of 70%, higher than the national average of 59.5%; male literacy is 78%, and female literacy is 61%. In Hatibandha, 12% of the population is under 6 years of age.
