= Ramai Deva =

- Reign: 1360 - 1380 CE
- House: Chauhan dynasty (Garh Sambhar)
- Father: Vishala Dev (or Hutumbur Singh alias Hambir Dev)
- Mother: Jayanti Devi
- Religion: Hinduism

Ramai Deva or Ramai Deo was a Rajput ruler who founded the Chauhan Dynasty rule in the erstwhile Patna state in today’s Bolangir district of Odisha in the year 1360 A.D. At the young age of twenty he staged a coup with the popular support of the commoners and overtook the Astha Mullicks or the eight regional Gauntias ruling as independent warlords in oligarchy after the Eastern Ganga administrator of the region died. The central control of the Gangas had nearly collapsed due to outside invasions. As an energetic and remarkable leader, he established his firm control of the erstwhile Patna state Odisha that might have included some parts of Chatishgarh as well.

Ramai Dev ruled for 20 years as stated in the Sanskrit work of Kosalananda Kavyam written in the seventeenth century by poet Pandit Gangadhar Mishra from Puri. The details about Chauhan rule and Ramai Deva's rise to power in the region, is corroborated by three literary works in three different languages i.e. Kosalananda Kavyam (in Sanskrit), Jayachandrika (in Hindi) written by Prahallad Dubey the court poet of Surguja in the late eighteenth century and Nrusimha Mahatmya (in Odia) by Lakshmana Mishra in the late nineteenth century. Besides these Prabodha Chandrika written in the fifteenth century by the Raja Vaijala Deva of Patna state who is a Chauhan descendant of Ramai Deva himself also corroborates facts about him.

== The Legend of Chauhan Arrival in Western Odisha ==
According to the details placed in all the contemporary literary accounts, Ramai Deva was born to one of the queens of Hutumbur Sing alias Hambir Dev alias Vishala Dev. His father was in the line of Chauhan rulers related to Prithiviraj Chauhan ruling in the Garh Sambhar region near Mainpuri in today’s Uttar Pradesh state. His pregnant queen named Jayanti Devi fled Garh Sambhar with some of her followers when Vishala Dev was killed by a Muslim king in a battle and is identified with Firuz Shah Tughlaq. Jayanti Devi found refuge in the house of a Brahmin ruler of Kholangarh division of the Patna state known as Chakradhar Panigrahi.

Chakradhar Pangrahi adopted Ramai Deva and he grew closer to the common people when a man-eating tiger was hunted down by him. It was predefined by a ministerial council that the one who kills the tiger will become the king of Patna state over the Oligarchy practiced by all the eight local rulers. Ramai Deva likely killed all the other seven rulers and became the king of the region after his foster father abdicated the throne in his favor. The eight divisions of Patna state ruled by the eight separate Gauntias or Mullicks before his time were Patnagarh, Kagaongarh, Salebhattagarh, Jarasinghagarh, Sindhekelagarh, Kholangarh, Goragarh and Kumnagarh.

== Rule in Patna ==
Ramai Deva had followed an unbiased policy for the people of his state. He also enforced law with an iron fist on those who did not comply, were unruly and disobedient. He recovered many areas that were lost by his previous kings and administrators of the region. He created a strong and disciplined principality in the region for the Eastern Ganga domain. Kosalananda Kavyam states that during a pilgrimage to Puri and in meeting with the Ganga king Bhanu Deva III, the later was so pleased with his karizma that he gave the hand of his niece in marriage to him. The Patna state was bound by the river Mahanadi in the north, river Tel in the south and Bindra Nawagarh area in west, which is in Chatishgarh state today. Ramai Deva was an energetic person and Kosalananda Kavya describes him as a very handsome man with a miraculous physical strength. He offered his devotion to the deities Vishnu, Shiva, Ganesha, Surya and Durga and patronized them. He built the Patneswari temple for the goddess with the same name who was the presiding deity of the kingdom. He also build a Shiva temple known as Kosaleswara Mahadeva. The priests of these temples still enjoy the five small villages granted to their forefathers by Ramai Deva for carrying out their ritual duties. The villages are Deulgan, Kalangapali, Diadumer, Uchvali and Ghunghutipali.

A descendant of Ramai Deva called Balarama Deva established the Chauhan rule at Sambalpur after transferring is rule from today's Bargarh district, founded a new state called Huma Desha and dominated the region above the parent state of Patna. Balaram Deva's descendant, Baliar Singh would conquer adjoining regions to his kingdom after multiple military campaigns, one of which includes the inclusion of Surguja and some 93 battles fought with Boudh for nearly one and half a decade before finally capturing it. The foundation of Chauhan Dynasty's rule led to the stability of the region in western Odisha despite the fall of preceding central and imperial authorities in Odisha mostly based at Cuttack. Chauhans carved out the last of the most effective and essentially dominant kingdoms in Odisha after the decline of the Gajapatis and continued to rule till the nineteenth century.
