= Sinapali =

Town in Odisha, India

- Village/Town
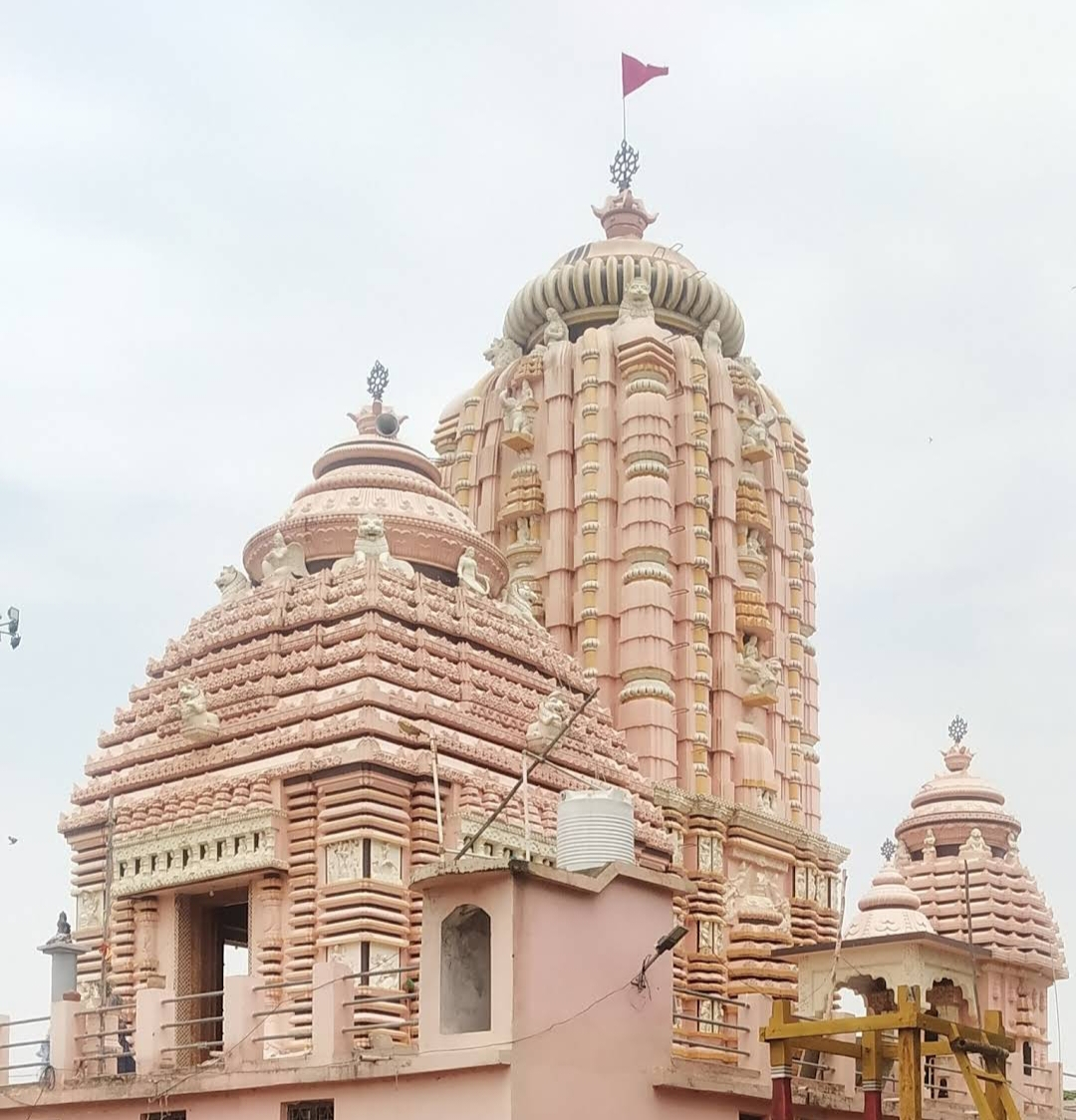

- Location in Odisha, India Sinapali (India)
- Coordinates: 20.0974°N 82.646°E
- Country: India
- State: Odisha
- District: Nuapada

Government
  - Body: Gram Panchayat Samiti
  - MLA: Adhiraj Mohan Panigrahi
  - MP: Basanta Kumar Panda

Population (2001)
  - Total: 9,987
- Demonym: Sinapalia

Languages
  - Official: Odia
  - Local: Sambalpuri
- Time zone: UTC+5:30 (IST)
- PIN: 766108
- Telephone code: 06677
- Vehicle registration: OD, OR
- Sex ratio: 50.3:49.7 ♂/♀
- Website: odisha.gov.in

Sinapali is the main town in Sinapali Tehsil in the south of Nuapada District in Odisha, India.

It is located on the bank of Udanti River, 95 kilometres (59 mi) south of the district headquarters of Nuapada (via road NH59) and 450 km (280 mi) from Odisha's capital Bhubaneswar. The village has a Gram panchayat (local governing council). Its total geographical area is 297 hectares (730 acres).

== Administration ==
Sinapali is a Panchayat Samiti block and Tahasil in Nuapada District of Odisha. The administrative head of the block is Block Development Officer (BDO). Many block-level offices are located here, including:-

- Tahasil Office
- Block Education Office
- Police Station
- Fire Station
- Community Health Center
- Regional Agriculture Office

=== Government ===
Sinapali Panchayat Samiti have a Chairman in its Block level.

=== Gram Panchayat ===
There are 27 Gram Panchyats.

== Demographics ==
According to the 2011 Census of India, Sinapali had the following population characteristics:

Number of households	1,315
Total population	5,069
Total males	2,769
Total females	2,553
Total SC population	536
Total ST population	353
Literacy rate	75.81%
Worker population	1,553

Males make up 50.3% of Sinapali's population, whereas 49.7% of the population is female.

The main languages spoken in the Sinpali and Nuapada districts are Sambalpuri, Laria. Odia and English is used in schools in Odisha for higher education.

== Economy ==
Sinapali's economy, like the rest of the Nuapada district, depends mainly upon its agricultural and forestry activities. Locals produce non-timber forest products such as the mahua flower, harida, bahada, and tol. Local agriculture is challenging due to limited irrigation facilities (less than 15%, only half of the state average).
