= Sambalpuri language =

Indo-Aryan language spoken primarily in western Odisha, India

Sambalpuri
- Western Odia
- ସମ୍ବଲପୁରୀ
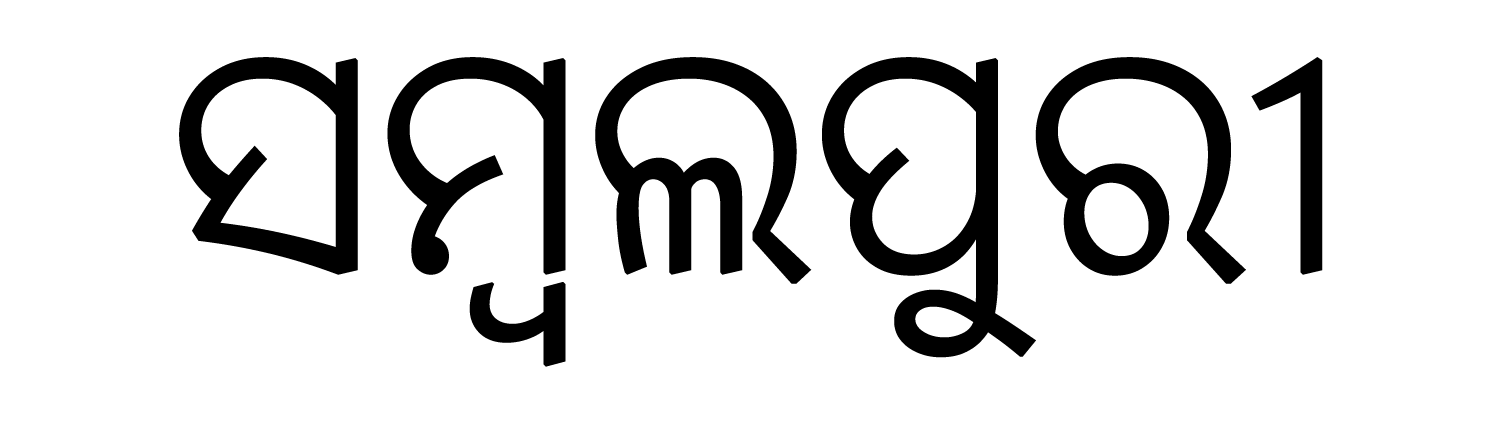
- 'Sambalpuri' in the Odia script
- Native to: India
- Region: Western Odisha
- Ethnicity: Odias
- Native speakers: 2.63 million (2011 census)
- Language family: Indo-European: Indo-Iranian; Indo-Aryan; Eastern; Odia; Sambalpuri
- Writing system: Odia

Language codes
- ISO 639-3: spv
- Glottolog: samb1325 Sambalpuri
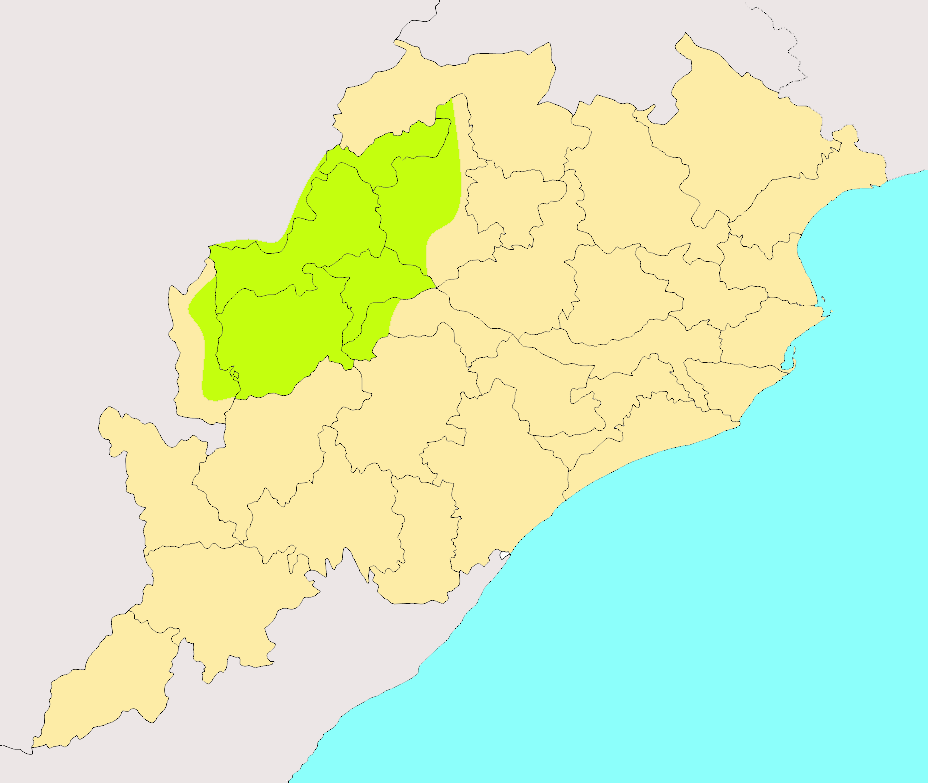
- Sambalpuri speaking areas in Odisha and Chhattisgarh

- Sambalpuri is classified as Vulnerable language by the UNESCO Atlas of the World's Languages in Danger

A multilingual person speaking Sadri, Kharia, and Sambalpuri language, recorded in China.

Sambalpuri (Sambalpuri: [sɔmbɔlɔpuɾi]) is an Indo-Aryan language variety spoken in western Odisha, India. It is alternatively known as Western Odia, and as Kosali (with variants Kosli, Koshal and Koshali), a recently popularised but controversial term, which draws on an association with the historical region of Dakshina Kosala, whose territories also included the present-day Sambalpur region.

Its speakers usually perceive it as a separate language, while outsiders have seen it as a dialect of Odia, and standard Odia is used by Sambalpuri speakers for formal communication. A 2006 survey of the varieties spoken in four villages found that they share three-quarters of their basic vocabulary with Standard Odia.

== Geographical Distribution ==
Distribution of Sambalpuri language in the district of Odisha
1. Bargarh (42.9%)
2. Subarnapur (13.8%)
3. Balangir (12.7%)
4. Sambalpur (10.4%)
5. Jharsuguda (9.30%)
6. Nuapada (5.50%)
7. Boudh (3.40%)
8. Sundargarh (1.60%)
9. Kalahandi (0.40%)

There were 2.63 million people in India who declared their language to be Sambalpuri at the 2011 census, almost all of them residents in Odisha. These speakers were mostly concentrated in the districts of Bargarh (1,130,000 speakers), Subarnapur (364,000), Balangir (335,000), Sambalpur (275,000), Jharsuguda (245,000), Nuapada (145,000), Baudh (90,700), Sundargarh (42,700) and Kalahandi (11,545).

== Script ==
The inscriptions and literary works from the Western Odisha region used the Odia script, which is attested through the inscriptions like the Stambeswari stone inscription of 1268 CE laid by the Eastern Ganga monarch Bhanu Deva I at Sonepur and the Meghla grant and Gobindpur charter of Raja Prithvi Sing of Sonepur State and also through the major epic Kosalananda Kavya composed during the 17th century Chauhan rule under Raja Baliar Singh of the Sambalpur State, which was written in Sanskrit in Odia script.

The Devanagari script may have been used in the past, (the Hindi language was mandated in administration and education in Sambalpur for the brief period 1895–1901)

There are many eminent poets from Sambalpuri language, PadmaShree Haldhar Nag, Khageswar seth, Hemachandra Acharya has contributed a lot for the language.

NRI Poet Prasanta Meher, Poet Ranjit Padhan, Hemanta Deep and many other have made a contribution.

== Phonology ==
Sambalpuri has 28 consonant phonemes, 2 semivowel phonemes and 5 vowel phonemes.

Sambalpuri vowel phonemes
	Front	Central	Back
High	i		u
Mid	e		(o)
Low		a	ɔ

There are no long vowels in Sambalpuri just like Standard Odia.

Sambalpuri consonant phonemes
		Labial	Alveolar /Dental	Retroflex	Palatal	Velar	Glottal
Nasal		m	n	ɳ			
Stop/ Affricate	voiceless	p	t	ʈ	tʃ	k	
Stop/ Affricate	voiceless aspirated	pʰ	tʰ	ʈʰ	tʃʰ	kʰ	
Stop/ Affricate	voiced	b	d	ɖ	dʒ	ɡ	
Stop/ Affricate	voiced aspirated	bʱ	dʱ	ɖʱ	dʒʱ	ɡʱ	
Fricative			s				ɦ
Trill/Flap			ɾ	ɽ~ɽʱ			
Lateral approximant			l				
Approximant		w			j		

Sambalpuri shows the loss of retroflex consonant like voiced retroflex lateral approximant [ɭ] (ଳ) which are present in Standard Odia, and a limited usage of retroflex unaspirated nasal (voiced retroflex nasal) ɳ (ଣ).

== Characteristics ==
The following is a list of features and comparison with Standard Odia:

Some key features include-

- r-insertion: insertion or paragoge of /r/ at the end of Sambalpuri verbs
- Word Medial Vowel Deletion: Syncope of certain word medial vowels, with exceptions seen in -ai diphthongs.
- Vowel Harmony: a shift of /o/ to /u/. This is also seen in the Baleswari Odia dialect and to an extent the Ganjami Odia dialect.
- Word Final Vowel Deletion: Apocope of word-final schwa (see Schwa deletion).
- Voiced retroflex consonant usage: Absence of voiced retroflex lateral approximant [ɭ] (ଳ) and limited usage of voiced retroflex nasal ɳ (ଣ).

Voiced retroflex consonant

Standard Odia	Sambalpuri	Meaning
କଣ (kaṇa)	କଣ୍ / କାଣା (kaṇ / kāṇā)	what

Word Medial Vowel Deletion: Syncope

Standard Odia	Sambalpuri	Meaning
ପଢ଼ିବା (paṛibā) padhibā	ପଢ଼୍‌ବାର୍ (paṛbār) padhbār	to study
ଗାଧେଇବା (gādheibā)	ଗାଧ୍‌ବାର୍ (gādhbār)	to bathe
ହସିବା (hasibā)	ହସ୍‌ବାର୍ (hasbār)	to laugh
ବୁଲିବା (bulibā)	ବୁଲ୍‌ବାର୍ (bulbār)	to roam
ରାନ୍ଧିବା (rāndhibā)	ରାନ୍ଧ୍‌ବାର୍ (rāndhbār)	to cook
ଖେଳିବା (kheḷibā)	ଖେଲ୍‌ବାର୍ (khelbār)	to play

Exceptions to Word Medial Vowel Deletion: seen in '-ai' diphthongs

Standard Odia	Sambalpuri	Meaning
ଖାଇବା (khāibā)	ଖାଏବାର୍ (khāebār)	to eat
ଗାଇବା (gāibā)	ଗାଏବାର୍ (gāebār)	to sing
ପାଇବା (pāibā)	ପାଏବାର୍ (pāebār)	to get
ହାଇ (hāi)	ହାଇ (hāi)	yawn
ଗାଇ (gāi)	ଗାଏ (gāe)	cow

Vowel Harmony: 'o' to 'u' phoneme shift, feature also seen in Baleswari Odia dialect

Standard Odia	Sambalpuri	Meaning
ଶୋଇବା (soibā)	ସୁଇବାର୍ (suibār)	to sleep
ଖୋଜିବା (khojibā)	ଖୁଜ୍‌ବାର୍ (khujbār)	to search

Lengthening of Vowel Sound: vowels which appear in between consonants take their longer counterpart

Standard Odia	Sambalpuri	Meaning
ପାଣି (pāṇi)	ପାଏନ୍ (pāen)	water
ଚାରି (cāri)	ଚାଏର୍ (cāer)	four

Consonant shift- shift of 'ḷ' phoneme to 'l'

Standard Odia	Sambalpuri	Meaning
ଫଳ (phaḷa)	ଫଲ୍ (phal)	fruit

Word Final Vowel Deletion(Schwa deletion Apocope)- a characteristic feature of Sambalpuri

Standard Odia	Sambalpuri	Meaning
ଭଲ (bhala)	ଭଲ୍ (bhal)	good
ବାଘ (bāgha)	ବାଘ୍ (bāgh)	tiger
କୁକୁର (kukura)	କୁକୁର୍ (kukur)	dog
ଲୋକ (loka)	ଲୋକ୍ (lok)	people
ଗଛ (gacha)	ଗଛ୍ (gach)	tree
ଫୁଲ (phula)	ଫୁଲ୍ (phul)	flower
ଭାତ (bhāta)	ଭାତ୍ (bhāt)	rice
ଘର (ghara)	ଘର୍ (ghar)	house

Sambalpuri words

Standard Odia	Sambalpuri	Meaning
ମାଛ (mācha)	ଝୁରି (jhuri)	fish
ବାଣ (bāṇa)	ଫଟ୍କା (phatka)	firecracker

== Language movement ==
There has been a language movement campaigning for the recognition of the language. Its main objective has been the inclusion of the language into the 8th schedule of the Indian constitution.

== Literature ==
- Satya Narayan Bohidar, writer and pioneer of Sambalpuri literature. Notable works include Ṭikcaham̐rā (1975), Sambalapurī bhāshāra sabda-bibhaba: bā, Saṃkshipta Sambalapurī byākaraṇa o racanā (1977)
- Prayag Dutta Joshi, Sambalpuri writer
- Nil Madhab Panigrahi, wrote Mahabharat Katha
- Haldhar Nag, Sambalpuri poet popularly known as "Lok kabi Ratna". His notable Sambalpuri works are Lokgeet, Samparda, Krushnaguru, Mahasati Urmila, Tara Mandodari, Achhia, Bacchhar, Siri Somalai, Veer Surendra Sai, Karamsani, Rasia Kavi, Prem Paechan. His works has been compiled into "Lokakabi Haladhar Granthabali" and "Surata". He was awarded the Padma Shri in 2016.
- Prafulla Kumar Tripathy, compiled the Sambalpuri-Odia Dictionary- Samalpuri Odia Shabdakosha (2001).
- Hema Chandra Acharya, wrote Ram Raha (2001), the Sambalpuri version of the Ramayana.

== See also ==
- Sambalpuri culture
- Sambalpuri cinema

== Bibliography ==
- Dash, Ashok Kumar (1990). Evolution of Sambalpuri language and its morphology (Thesis). Sambalpur University. hdl:10603/187859.
- Mathai, Eldose K.; Kelsall, Juliana (2013). Sambalpuri of Orissa, India: A Brief Sociolinguistic Survey (Report). SIL Electronic Survey Reports.
- Patel, Kunjaban (n.d.). A Sambalpuri phonetic reader (Thesis). Sambalpur University.
- Sahu, Gobardhan (2001). Generative phonology of Sambalpuri: a study (revised) (PhD). Sambalpur University. hdl:10603/187791.
- Sahu, Gopal Krishna (2002). A derivational morphology of Sambalpuri (Thesis). Sambalpur University. hdl:10603/187186.

== External links and further reading ==
- Biswal, Tuna (2010). "Politics of Sambalpuri or Kosali as a dialect of Oriy in Orissa" (PDF). Language in India. 10 (11).
- Registered newspapers and magazines published in Kosli language
- Datta, S.P. (2002). "Sambalpuri dialect". Linguistic survey of India: special studies: Orissa. Special studies / Linguistic Survey of India. Kolkata: Language Division, Office of the Registrar General, India. pp. 67–93.
