= Nuapada =

- Town/City
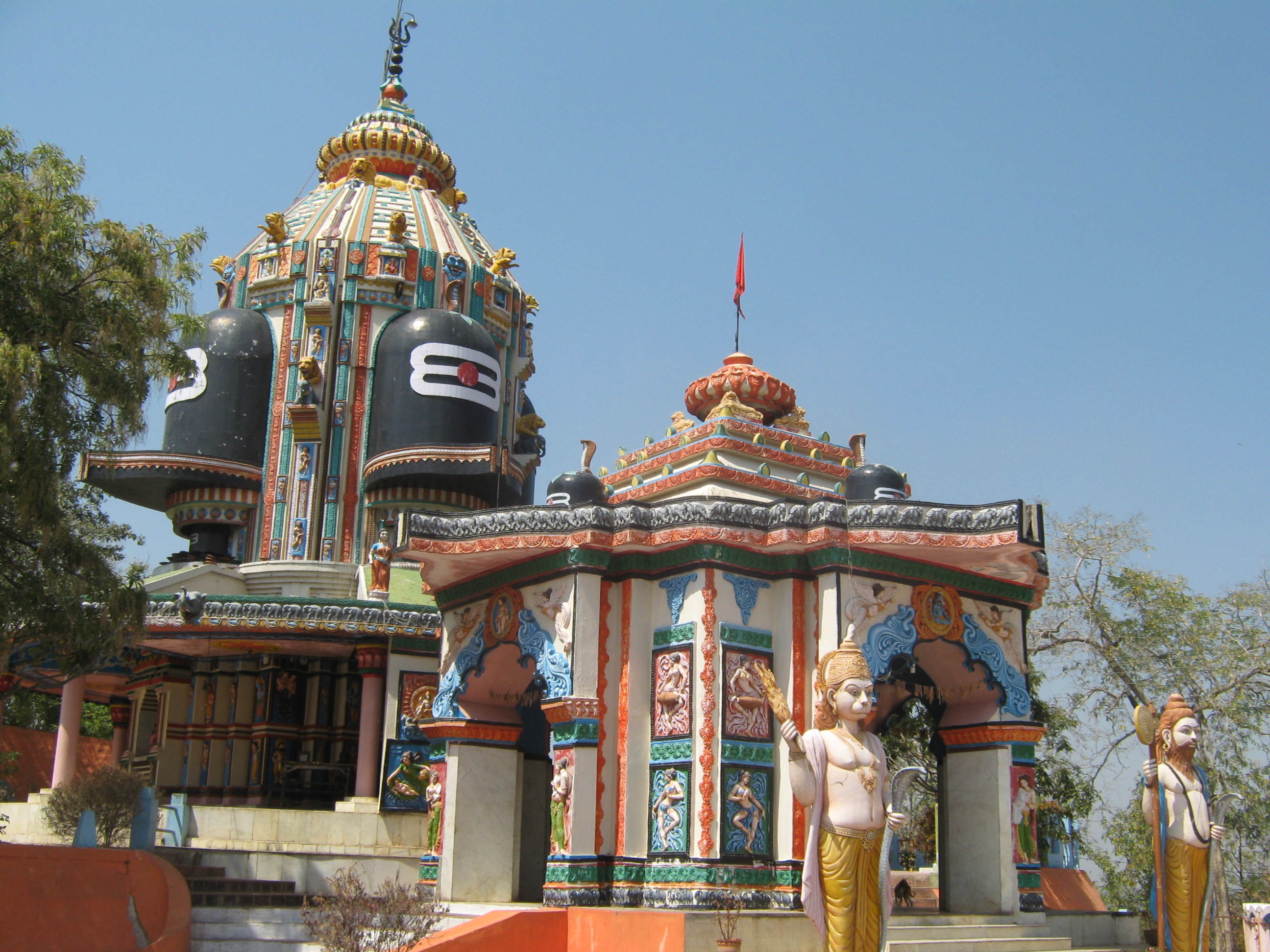

- Location in Odisha, India Nuapada (India) Nuapada (Asia) Nuapada (Earth)
- Coordinates: 20°48′22.067″N 82°32′1.849″E
- Country: India
- State: Odisha
- District: Nuapada

Government
  - Type: NAC
  - Body: Notified Area Council
  - MP: Malvika Devi (BJP)
  - MLA: Jay Dholakia (BJP)

Languages
  - Official: Odia, English
- Time zone: UTC+5:30 (IST)
- Postal code: 766108
- Vehicle registration: OD-26
- Website: odisha.gov.in
- The headquarter of Nuapada district

Nuapada is a town in western region of Odisha state of eastern India. It is the headquarter of Nuapada district. Nuapada district was carved out of the undivided Kalahandi district on 27 March 1993. It is on the western border of Odisha with Chhattisgarh. The district is part of Odisha both linguistically and culturally. It is one of the most underdeveloped districts of Odisha and India as well.

== Demographics ==
Nuapada's estimated population of 6,10,382, includes 3,01,962 males and 3,08,420 females. The estimated number of literate people in the total population is 2,99,383. It is clear that it has a low literacy rate.

== Places of interest ==
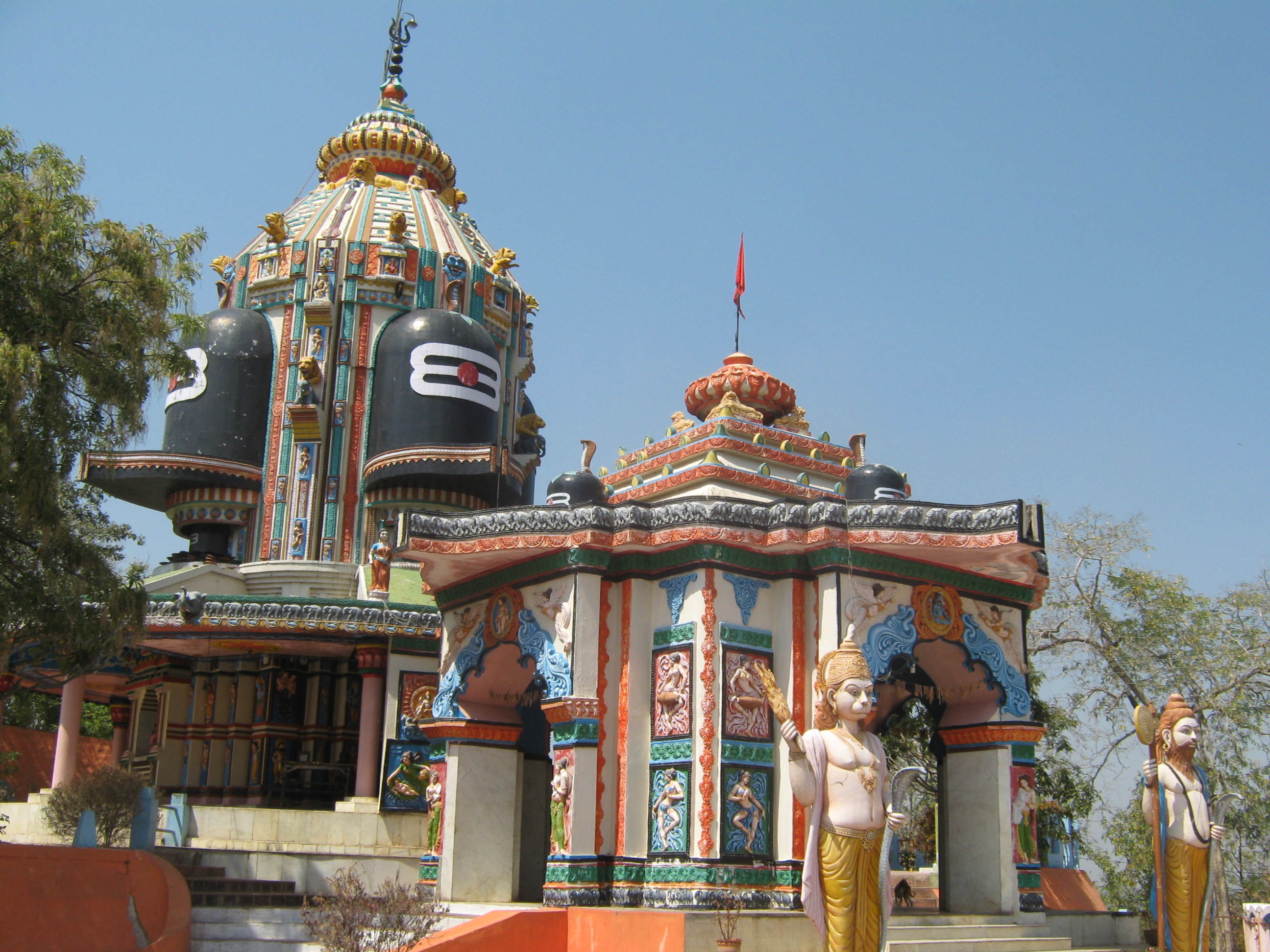
Yogeswar Temple, Patora

Situated 18 km from Nuapada Yogeswar temple at Patora is famous for its ancient and old Shiva Linga. Gulshan Kumar helped for the construction of the new temple.

== Politics ==
Current MLA from Nuapada Assembly Constituency is BJD candidate Sri Rajendra Dholakia, who won the seat in State elections of 2024. This is his fourth term as MLA. His first term was in the year 2004 as an independent candidate. Previous MLAs from this seat were Basant Kumar Panda of BJP who contested as the Member of Parliament from Kalahandi in 2019 after his two terms as MLA, Ghasi Ram Majhi who won representing JD in 1995 and 1990 and representing JNP in 1985 and in 1977, and Bhanuprakash Joshi of INC(I) in 1980.

Nawapara district is part of the Kalahandi (Lok Sabha constituency).

== People and culture ==
The language spoken in Nuapada is Sambalpuri Odia. Although it is a district headquarters, the culture is predominantly rural and agrarian. Nuapada has often been in news for alleged instances of starvation deaths in nearby places like Komana, Boden and Sinapali. Betting and country liquor is a common pastime for the local people as the place does not have any modern entertainment avenue. There is no cinema, theatre or sports facility in Nuapada.

== Schools ==
The main schools in Nuapada are-

- Kendriya Vidyalaya Nuapada
- Odisha Adarsha Vidyalaya ( Model School )
- Gyanjyoti KR Vidyalaya
- National High School
- St.Mary Public School
- K.N Kids Public School
- MEC Public School
