= Arkesh Singh Deo =

Indian politician

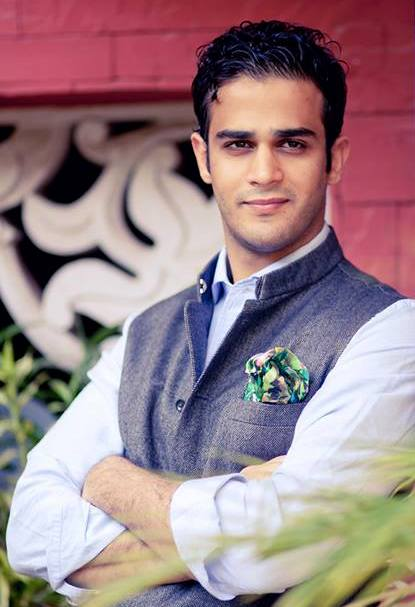
- Born: 15 January 1986 (age 40)
- Education: Doon School Dehradun, St. Stephen's College, Delhi
- Height: 1.90 m (6 ft 3 in)
- Political party: Biju Janata Dal
- Father: Ananga Udaya Singh Deo
- Relatives: Kalikesh Narayan Singh Deo (Brother); Kanak Vardhan Singh Deo (Paternal Cousin)

Arkesh Singh Deo (born 15 January 1986) is an Indian politician from Odisha and a leader of the Biju Janata Dal political party. Deo is the youngest son of politician Ananga Udaya Singh Deo and grandson of Rajendra Narayan Singh Deo, former Chief Minister of Odisha.

== Early life and background ==
Arkesh Singh Deo was born to politician Ananga Udaya Singh Deo and Vijaya Laxmi Devi. His grandfather, Rajendra Narayan Singh Deo (31 March 1912 – 23 February 1975) was an Indian politician and the last ruler of the princely state of Patna in Odisha before Indian independence in 1947 and was also the Chief Minister of Orissa from 1967 to 1971. His elder brother, Kalikesh Narayan Singh Deo is also a politician from Odisha. He attended The Doon School, in Dehradun, and later attended St. Stephen's College, Delhi.

== Career ==
Prior to entering politics, Deo was a model based in Delhi. During the 2019 Odisha Legislative Assembly election, Deo unsuccessfully contested from the Bolangir Assembly constituency.

== Personal life ==
In 2017, Deo married Adrija Manjari Singh, the granddaughter of former Prime Minister of India, V.P. Singh. However, Deo and Adrija are estranged.

== See also ==
- Bolangir (Lok Sabha constituency)
- Indian general election in Orissa, 2009
- Biju Janata Dal
- Kalikesh Narayan Singh Deo
- Sangeeta Singh Deo
