= Raj Raj Singh Deo =

Indian politician

Member of Parliament, Lok Sabha
- In office 1967–1977
- Preceded by: Hrushikesh Mahananda
- Succeeded by: Ainthu Sahoo
- Constituency: Bolangir

Personal details
- Born: 26 April 1934 Patiala, Patiala State, British India
- Died: 1 April 2004 (aged 69)
- Party: Swatantra Party
- Other political affiliations: Ganatantra Parishad
- Spouse: Premlata Kumari Devi
- Relations: Ananga Udaya Singh Deo (brother); Kalikesh Narayan Singh Deo (paternal nephew); Arkesh Singh Deo (paternal nephew)
- Children: 4, including Kanak Vardhan Singh
- Parent: Rajendra Narayan Singh Deo
- Education: Mayo College, Ajmer; Rajkumar College, Raipur

Raj Raj Singh Deo (26 April 1934 – 1 April 2004) was an Indian politician and a member of the former royal family of the erstwhile princely state of Patna in Odisha. He was a member of the Swatantra Party and represented the Bolangir Lok Sabha constituency in the 4th and 5th Lok Sabha.

== Early life and background ==
Raj Raj Singh Deo was the son of Rajendra Narayan Singh Deo, former Chief Minister of Odisha and the last ruler of the princely state of Patna, and Kailash Kumari Devi, daughter of Maharaja Bhupinder Singh of Patiala. Deo's brother Ananga Udaya Singh is also a politician. He studied in the Mayo College in Ajmer and the Rajkumar College in Raipur.

== Political career ==
Deo was a Member of the Lok Sabha in the 4th and 5th Lok Sabha, representing the Bolangir constituency. He was a member of the Swatantra Party.

== Personal life and family ==
Deo was married to Premlata Devi and had 4 children, Kanak Vardhan Singh Deo, Mitrabinda Kumari Panwar, Vardhan Singh Deo, Satyarajeshwari Singh. His son, Kanak, is a politician who has held various positions, including Deputy Chief Minister of Odisha, and is married to Sangeeta Kumari Singh Deo, who is also a politician. Deo's granddaughter Nivritti, the daughter of his son Kanak, married Lakshyaraj Singh Mewar, a businessman and member of the former Mewar royal family, and the son of Arvind Singh Mewar, a businessman.
