= Sarat Pattanayak =

Indian politician (born 1956)

President Odisha Pradesh Congress Committee
- In office 23 May 2022 – 11 February 2025
- Preceded by: Niranjan Patnaik
- Succeeded by: Bhakta Charan Das
- In office 2001–2004
- Preceded by: Janaki Ballabh Patnaik
- Succeeded by: Janaki Ballabh Patnaik

Member of Parliament, Lok Sabha
- In office 1991–1998
- Preceded by: Balgopal Mishra
- Succeeded by: Sangeeta Kumari Singh Deo
- Constituency: Balangir, Odisha

Personal details
- Born: 15 August 1956 (age 70) Saintala, Odisha, India
- Party: Indian National Congress
- Spouse: Namita Pattanayak

Sarat Pattanayak (born 15 August 1956) is an Indian politician hailing from Balangir in Odisha. He was elected to the 10th and 11th Lok Sabha, the lower house of the Parliament of India as a member of Parliament of the Indian National Congress party. He has served as the President of the Odisha Pradesh Congress Committee.

== Early life ==
He was born to Jugul Pattanayak on 15 August 1956, in Saintala near Balangir. He is married to Namita Pattanayak. They have two daughters and a son.

== Education ==
He completed his bachelor's degree from Rajendra College, Balangir later pursuing a law (LLB) degree from Gangadhar Meher College & Lajpat Rai Law College, Sambalpur.

== Career ==
Having served as an elected Member of Lok Sabha in the then ruling P V Narasimha Rao government which gave him a close quarter view of the 1992 economic liberalisation in India, Sarat also served as the Odisha Pradesh Congress Committee's president in the Indian state of Odisha. He unsuccessfully contested on an Indian National Congress MLA ticket from Nuapada Assembly Constituency during the 2024 state legislative assembly elections and lost. Though having performed miserably during his tenure the party did increase its tally of MLAs in the house.
