= Ananga Udaya Singh Deo =

Indian politician

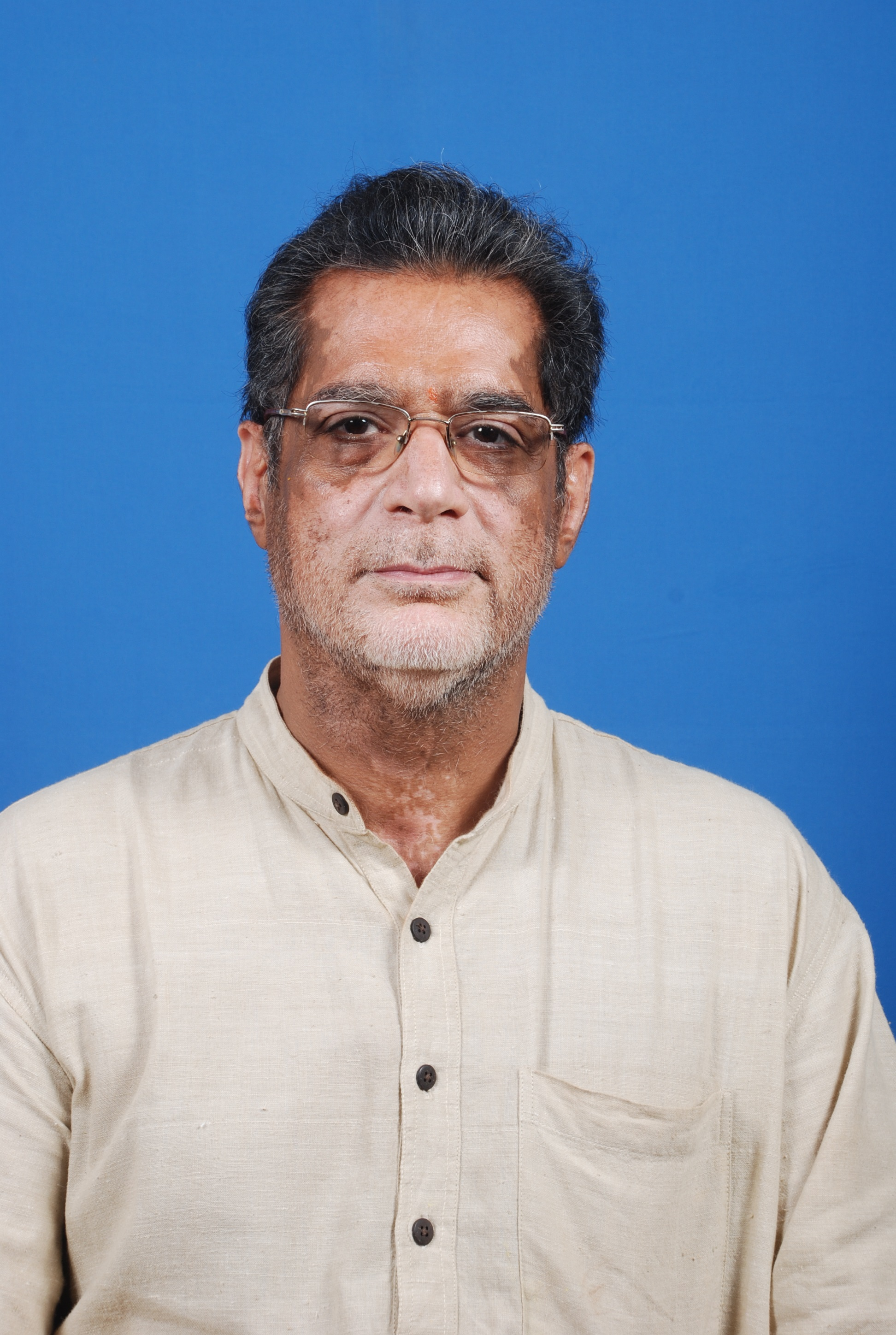

Member of Parliament in the Rajya Sabha for Odisha
- In office 3 April 2014 – 3 April 2018
- Succeeded by: Soumya Ranjan Patnaik
- Constituency: Odisha

Member of the Odisha Legislative Assembly
- In office 1990–2014
- Preceded by: Mahammad Mujafar Hussain Khan
- Succeeded by: Narasingha Mishra
- Constituency: Bolangir
- In office 1974–1977
- Preceded by: Nandakishore Misra
- Succeeded by: Ram Prasad Misra
- Constituency: Loisingha

Minister Of Odisha Govt.
- In office 1990–1995
- In office 2000–2004
- In office 2009–2012

Personal details
- Born: 11 November 1945 (age 80) Bolangir, Orissa, British India
- Party: Biju Janata Dal
- Other political affiliations: Janata Dal, Swatantra Party
- Relations: Raj Raj Singh Deo (brother); Kanak Vardhan Singh Deo (nephew)
- Children: 3, including Kalikesh and Arkesh
- Parent: Rajendra Narayan Singh Deo (father)
- Education: The Doon School
- Profession: Politician, farmer, businessman
- Website: http://www.ausinghdeo.com

Ananga Udaya Singh Deo, also known as A U Singh Deo, is an Indian politician from Odisha. He is son of former Odisha Chief Minister Rajendra Narayan Singh Deo. He is also uncle to current Odisha Deputy Chief Minister Kanak Vardhan Singh Deo.

== Background and early life ==
Ananga Udaya Singh Deo is the son of Rajendra Narayan Singh Deo, former chief minister of Odisha, and Kailash Kumari Devi, the daughter of Maharaja Bhupinder Singh of Patiala. His father, Rajendra, was the last maharaja of the princely state of Patna. Deo's brother, Raj Raj Singh, was a politician.

Deo was educated at The Doon School in Dehradun. He and former Odisha Chief Minister Naveen Patnaik attended the school at the same time.

== Career ==
Deo is a former member of the Odisha Legislative Assembly and has represented the Bolangir constituency and earlier, the Loisingha constituency. Deo has served as a cabinet minister in the Odisha Government and has held various portfolios in the state government, including excise and mines. In 2011, he resigned from the Odisha cabinet due to the hooch tragedy in Cuttack. Deo served as a Member of Parliament in the Rajya Sabha from 2014 to 2018.

== Personal life ==
Deo is married to Vijaya Laxmi Devi. They have three sons. Two of his sons, Kalikesh and Arkesh, are politicians.
