= Nityananda Misra =

Indian politician (1928–2021)

Member of Parliament, Lok Sabha
- In office 1980–1989
- Preceded by: Ainthu Sahoo
- Succeeded by: Balgopal Mishra
- Constituency: Bolangir, Odisha

Personal details
- Born: 1928 Bolangir, Odisha, British Raj
- Died: 22 July 2021 (aged 92–93)
- Party: Indian National Congress
- Spouse: Sabita Misra

Nityananda Misra (1928 – 22 July 2021) was an Indian politician. He was elected to the Lok Sabha, the lower house of the Parliament of India as a member of the Indian National Congress.
