= Ainthu Sahoo =

Indian politician

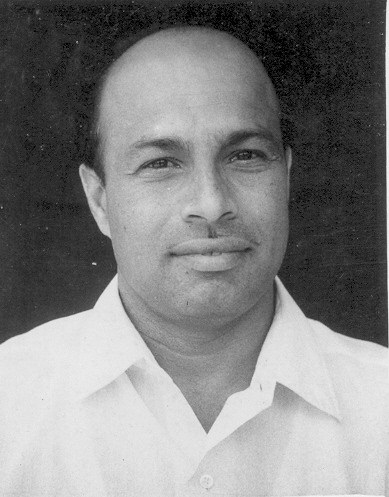
- Ainthu Sahoo

Member: 6th Lok Sabha
- Preceded by: Raj Raj Singh Deo
- Succeeded by: Nityananda Misra
- Constituency: Bolangir

Personal details
- Born: 1 January 1928 Batharla, Bolangir
- Died: November 28, 2013 (aged 85)
- Party: Janata Party
- Other political affiliations: Swatantra Party, Ganatantra Parishad, Bharatiya Lok Dal
- Spouse: Pouraamasi Devi
- Education: Rajendra College, Bolangir; Madhusudan Law College, Cuttack

Ainthu Sahoo (1 January 1928 – 28 November 2013) was an Indian politician. He represented Bolangir loksabha constituency in 6th Loksabha.

== Early life ==
Ainthu Sahoo was born to Bhagwan Sahoo at Batharla village of Bolangir District in Odisha. He studied in the Rajendra College bolangir and the Madhusudan Law College in Cuttack.

== Political career ==
He was elected to Odisha state assembly from Patnagarh assembly constituency 3 times. He also represented Bolangir Loksabha constituency in 6th Loksabha as member of swatantra party. He chaired of Western Odisha Development Council.
