= Bolangir Lok Sabha constituency =

Lok Sabha constituency in Odisha

Coordinates: 20.681917°N 83.338233°E

Bolangir OD-10
- Lok Sabha constituency
- Interactive Map Outlining Bolangir Lok Sabha constituency

Constituency details
- Country: India
- Region: East India
- State: Odisha
- Assembly constituencies: Birmaharajpur; Sonepur; Loisingha; Patnagarh; Bolangir; Titlagarh; Kantabanji
- Established: 1962
- Total electors: 18,03,544 (Note: as on 2024) (Note: as data published by election commission)
- Reservation: None

Member of Parliament
- 18th Lok Sabha
- Incumbent Sangeeta Kumari Singh Deo
- Party: BJP
- Elected year: 2024

Bolangir Lok Sabha constituency is one of the 21 Lok Sabha (parliamentary) constituencies in Odisha state in eastern India.

== Assembly Segments ==
Following delimitation, at present this constituency comprises the following legislative assembly segments:

#	Name	District	Member	Party	Leading (in 2024)
64	Birmaharajpur (SC)	Subarnapur	Raghunath Jagadala	BJP	BJP
65	Sonepur	Subarnapur	Niranjan Pujari	BJD	BJP
66	Loisingha (SC)	Bolangir	Mukesh Mahaling	BJP	BJP
67	Patnagarh	Bolangir	Kanak Vardhan Singh Deo	BJP	BJP
68	Bolangir	Bolangir	Kalikesh Narayan Singh Deo	BJD	BJD
69	Titlagarh	Bolangir	Nabin Kumar Jain	BJP	BJP
70	Kantabanji	Bolangir	Laxman Bag	BJP	BJP

Before delimitation in 2008, the legislative assembly segments, which constituted this parliamentary constituency were: Nawapara, Titilagarh, Kantabanji, Patnagarh, Saintala, Loisinga and Bolangir.

== Elected members ==
Vote share of winning candidates
2024	44.12%
2019	38.12%
2014	29.02%
2009	29.8%
2004	44.33%
1999	64.06%
1998	61.75%
1996	34.81%
1991	36.22%
1989	64.25%
1984	52.63%
1980	55.59%
1977	63.09%
1971	61.88%

Since its formation in 1962, 16 elections have been held till date.

List of members elected from Bolangir constituency are

Year	Member	Party
1962	Hrushikesh Mahanand	Ganatantra Parishad
1967	Raj Raj Singh Deo	Swatantra Party
1971	Raj Raj Singh Deo	Swatantra Party
1977	Ainthu Sahoo	Bharatiya Lok Dal
1980	Nityananda Misra	Indian National Congress (I)
1984	Nityananda Misra	Indian National Congress
1989	Balgopal Mishra	Janata Dal
1991	Sarat Pattanayak	Indian National Congress
1996	Sarat Pattanayak	Indian National Congress
1998	Sangeeta Kumari Singh Deo	Bharatiya Janata Party
1999	Sangeeta Kumari Singh Deo	Bharatiya Janata Party
2004	Sangeeta Kumari Singh Deo	Bharatiya Janata Party
2009	Kalikesh Narayan Singh Deo	Biju Janata Dal
2014	Kalikesh Narayan Singh Deo	Biju Janata Dal
2019	Sangeeta Kumari Singh Deo	Bharatiya Janata Party
2024	Sangeeta Kumari Singh Deo	Bharatiya Janata Party

== Election results ==
=== 2024 ===
Voting were held on 20 May 2024 in 5th phase of Indian General Election. Counting of votes was on 4 June 2024. In 2024 election, Bharatiya Janata Party candidate Sangeeta Kumari Singh Deo defeated Biju Janata Dal candidate Surendra Singh Bhoi by a margin of 1,32,664 votes.

2024 Indian general election: Bolangir
Party	Candidate	Votes	%	±%
BJP	Sangeeta Kumari Singh Deo	617,744	44.12	▲6.00
BJD	Surendra Singh Bhoi	4,85,080	34.64	▼1.98
INC	Manoj Kumar Mishra	2,30,874	16.49	▼4.25
NOTA	None of the above	16,064	1.15	▼0.07
Majority		1,32,664	9.48	▲7.98
Turnout		14,04,453	77.87	▲2.96
BJP hold				

=== 2019 ===
In 2019 election, Bharatiya Janata Party candidate Sangeeta Kumari Singh Deo defeated Biju Janata Dal candidate Kalikesh Narayan Singh Deo by a margin of 19,516 votes.

2019 Indian general elections: Bolangir
Party	Candidate	Votes	%	±%
BJP	Sangeeta Kumari Singh Deo	498,086	38.12	+8.29
BJD	Kalikesh Narayan Singh Deo	4,78,570	36.62	−2.84
INC	Samarendra Mishra	2,71,056	20.74	−2.97
NOTA	None of the above	16,001	1.22	−0.57
API	Dinesh Nag	13,909	1.09	
BSP	Rana Nag	12,229	0.94	
Majority		19,516	1.50	
Turnout		13,06,744	74.91	
BJP gain from BJD		Swing	+5.57	

=== 2014 ===
In 2014 election, Biju Janata Dal candidate Kalikesh Narayan Singh Deo defeated Bharatiya Janata Party candidate Sangeeta Kumari Singh Deo by a margin of 1,04,299 votes.

2014 Indian general elections: Bolangir
Party	Candidate	Votes	%	±%
BJD	Kalikesh Narayan Singh Deo	453,519	38.74	
BJP	Sangeeta Kumari Singh Deo	3,49,220	29.83	
INC	Sarat Pattanayak	2,77,616	23.71	
AAP	Saraswati Nanda	24,515	2.09	
API	Achyutananda Nag	14,626	1.24	
BSP	Rana Nag	11,513	0.98	
NOTA	None of the above	21,043	1.79	
Majority		1,04,299	8.91	
Turnout		11,70,961	74.92	
BJD hold				

=== 2009 ===
In 2009 election, Biju Janata Dal candidate Kalikesh Narayan Singh Deo defeated Indian National Congress candidate Narasingha Mishra by a margin of 90,835 votes.

2009 Indian general elections: Bolangir
Party	Candidate	Votes	%	±%
BJD	Kalikesh Narayan Singh Deo	430,150	29.8	
INC	Narasingha Mishra	3,39,315	23.51	
BJP	Sangeeta Kumari Singh Deo	1,91,739	13.28	
Majority		90,835	8.98	
Turnout		10,12,022	70.11	
BJD gain from BJP				

== See also ==
- Bolangir district
- List of constituencies of the Lok Sabha
