= Rajendra University =

University in Odisha, India

- Prajna Vihar
- Motto: आरोह तमसो ज्योतिः
- Type: Public
- Established: 3 July 1944; 82 years ago (as College); 1 September 2020; 6 years ago (as University)
- Affiliations: UGC
- Chancellor: Governor of Odisha
- Vice-Chancellor: Bibhuti Bhusan Malik
- Location: Balangir, Odisha, 767002, India; 20°42′08″N 83°28′02″E
- Campus: Urban
- Website: rajendrauniversity.ac.in

Rajendra University, formerly known as Rajendra Autonomous College is situated in Balangir, Odisha, India.

== History ==
The university was established as an Intermediate college in 1944 by Maharaja Rajendra Narayan Singh Deo, the erstwhile ruler of Patna State and one of the former Chief Ministers of Odisha as Rajendra College.

It started degree courses in July 1944 by offering B.A. (pass) class. It became a full-fledged degree college after the affiliation of Commerce Faculty (B.Com. class) in 1964–65 and Science faculty (B.Sc. class) in 1965–66. From 1978 to 1979, it started offering post graduate courses in Arts, Science and Commerce. From 1967 to 2002, this college was affiliated to Sambalpur University.

The college was granted autonomy from 1 April 2002.

In December 2019, the college celebrated its platinum anniversary where Vice President of India Venkaiah Naidu was to inaugurate, but couldn't because of bad weather. He delivered a video message and inaugurated the function.

It was upgraded by the Government of Odisha to a university on 1 September 2020. Deepak Kumar Behera was appointed as first vice chancellor of this university.

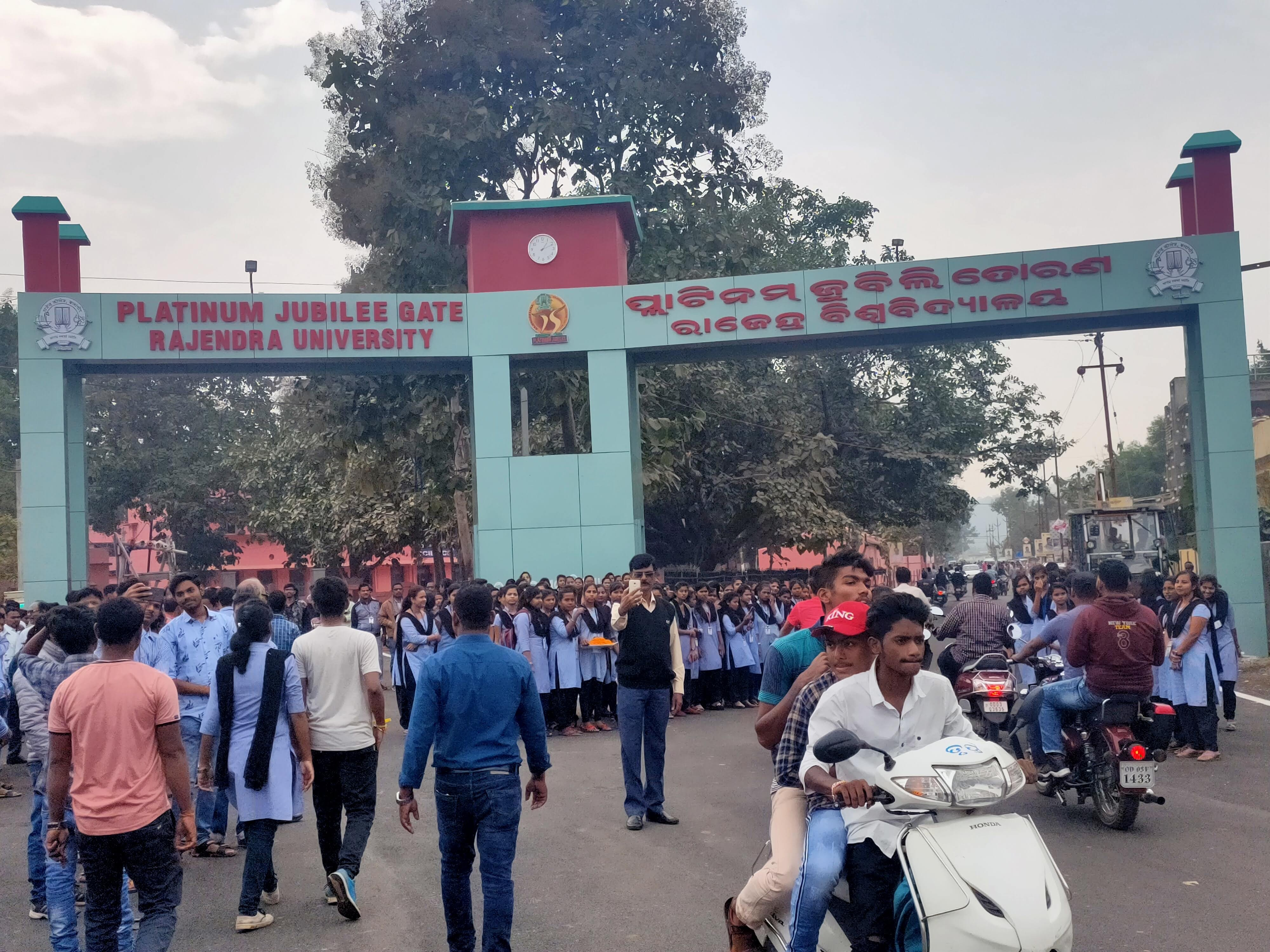
Platinum Jubilee Gate

In 2020, Chief Minister of Odisha sanctioned 50 crores for development of this university.

== Academics ==
The college offers three-year degree courses and two-year post-graduate degree programmes in following departments.

=== Arts ===
- Department of English
- Department of History
- Department of Political Science
- Department of Economics
- Department of Odia
- Department of Hindi
- Department of Sanskrit
- Department of Geography
- Department of Mathematics
- Department of Education
- Department of Philosophy

=== Science ===
- Department of Physics
- Department of Chemistry
- Department of Botany
- Department of Zoology
- Department of Mathematics
- Department of Computer Science

=== Commerce ===
- Department of Commerce

== Affiliated colleges ==
The university has jurisdiction over colleges in Balangir and Subarnapur district.

| Name | Location |
|---|---|
| Agalpur Panchayat Samiti College, Roth, Balangir | Balangir |
| Agalpur Science College, Agalpur, Balangir | Balangir |
| Anchalik Degree Mahavidyalay, Kusang, Balangir | Balangir |
| College Of Teacher Education, Balangir | Balangir |
| Dayanand Anglo Vedic (DAV) College, Titilagarh, Balangir | Balangir |
| Kantabanji Degree Vocational College, Kantabanji, Balangir | Balangir |
| Government Ayurvedic College, Balangir | Balangir |
| Government Bolangir College (Even.) Balangir | Balangir |
| Government Women's College, Balangir | Balangir |
| Jagannath College, Sahajbahal, Balangir | Balangir |
| Jawaharlal College, Patnagarh, Balangir | Balangir |
| Jyoti Vikash College, Bhainsa, Balangir | Balangir |
| Loisinga College, Loisinga, Balangir | Balangir |
| Mahimunda College, Mahimunda, Balangir | Balangir |
| Panchayat Samiti College, Muribahal, Balangir | Balangir |
| Panchyat Degree College, Ghasian, Balangir | Balangir |
| Panchayat Samiti Degree College, Bangomunda, Balangir | Balangir |
| Panchayat Samiti 3 Mahavidyalaya Deogaon, Balangir | Balangir |
| Panchayat Samiti College, Belpada, Balangir | Balangir |
| Panchayat Samiti College, Lathore, Balangir | Balangir |
| Patneswari Women's College, Patnagarh, Balangir | Balangir |
| Radheshyam Anchalik Degree College, Bilaisarda, Balangir | Balangir |
| Saswat Mahavidyalaya Jarasingha, Balangir | Balangir |
| Sudam Charan Degree College, Chandanbhati, Balangir | Balangir |
| Sushree Institute of Technical Education, Sadaipali, Balangir | Balangir |
| Tusra Degree College, Tusra Balangir | Balangir |
| Yuvadaya College of Advanced Technology, Balangir | Balangir |
| +3 Women's College, Kantabanji | Balangir |
| Area Education Society (AES) College, Tarbha, Subarnapur | Subarnapur |
| Biju Patnaik Degree Women's College, Sonepur | Subarnapur |
| Birmaharajpur College, Birmaharajpur, Subarnapur | Subarnapur |
| Dunguripali College, Dunguripali, Subarnapur | Subarnapur |
| Gram Panchayat College, Lachhipur, Subarnapur | Subarnapur |
| Jaloe Degree College, Jaloe, Subarnapur | Subarnapur |
| Panchayat Samiti Degree College, Ullunda, Subarnapur | Subarnapur |
| Shree Ram College, S.Rampur, Subarnapur | Subarnapur |
| Sidhartha College, Binka, Subarnapur | Subarnapur |
| Sonepur College, Sonepur, Subarnapur | Subarnapur |
| Anchaliik Degree College, Subalaya, Subarnapur | Subarnapur |

Ghuna degree college ghuna, Balangir
