= Narasingha Mishra =

Indian politician

Narasingh Mishra
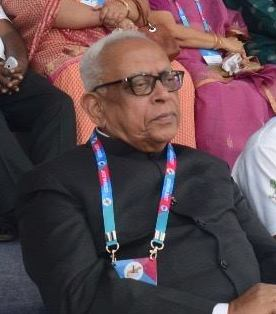

Leader of Opposition in the Odisha Legislative Assembly
- In office 11 Jun 2014 – 29 May 2019
- Preceded by: Bhupinder Singh
- Succeeded by: Pradipta Kumar Naik

Member of Odisha Legislative Assembly
- In office 2014–2024
- Preceded by: Ananga Udaya Singh Deo
- Succeeded by: Kalikesh Narayan Singh Deo
- Constituency: Bolangir
- In office 2004–2009
- Preceded by: Balgopal Mishra
- Succeeded by: Ramakanta Seth
- Constituency: Loisingha
- In office 1995–2000
- Preceded by: Panchanana Mishra
- Succeeded by: Niranjan Pujari
- Constituency: Binka
- In office 1990–1995
- Preceded by: Balgopal Mishra
- Succeeded by: Balgopal Mishra
- Constituency: Loisingha

Minister of Law Government of Odisha
- In office 15 March 1990 – 15 March 1995
- Chief Minister: Biju Patnaik
- Preceded by: Hemananda Biswal
- Succeeded by: Raghunath Patnaik

Personal details
- Born: 23 December 1940 (age 85) Loisingha, Odisha, India
- Party: Indian National Congress
- Other political affiliations: Janata Dal
- Spouse: Kusum Mishra
- Education: Madhusudan Law University, Cuttack
- Profession: Lawyer, Agriculturist, Politician

Nrusingha Mishra (born 23 December 1940) is a politician from Odisha, India. He was the Leader of Opposition in the 15th Odisha Legislative Assembly.

He was the Deputy Leader of the Congress from 2004-2009. But he was first elected to the state legislature in 1990 from JD and served as the Law Minister. He has represented Balangir region from the Indian National Congress party several times. He was the Leader of Opposition (LoP) from 2014-2019. In the 2019 Odisha election, he has got elected instead of his main opponent Arkesh Narayan Singh Deo of BJD by margin of 5431 votes.

== Background ==
Narasingha Mishra (Narsing Mishra/Narasingh Mishra) comes from the small village of Chhatamakhana near Balangir in Odisha. His father, Judhisthira Mishra, was a lawyer and a member of the Constituent assembly of India. Born into a family where politics was a part and parcel of the daily life, he joined politics at the age of 18 and was enrolled as a member of the Communist Party of India and continued as such until 1993. During that period, he held many party positions and successfully led several agitations.

He has had a very successful practice as a lawyer. Except for the period when he was a minister he has remained in active practice. Notable amongst his achievements for public cause as a lawyer was, the Orissa High Court directive to state government for direct procurement of paddy from farmers.

== Political career ==
Although he joined the state legislature only in 1990, he was considered to be a power center in Balangir for a long time by being in Communist Party before 1990. He is said to be the mentor of many peasant leaders and former public representatives from the region and this probably makes him a potential force irrespective of the party he represents.

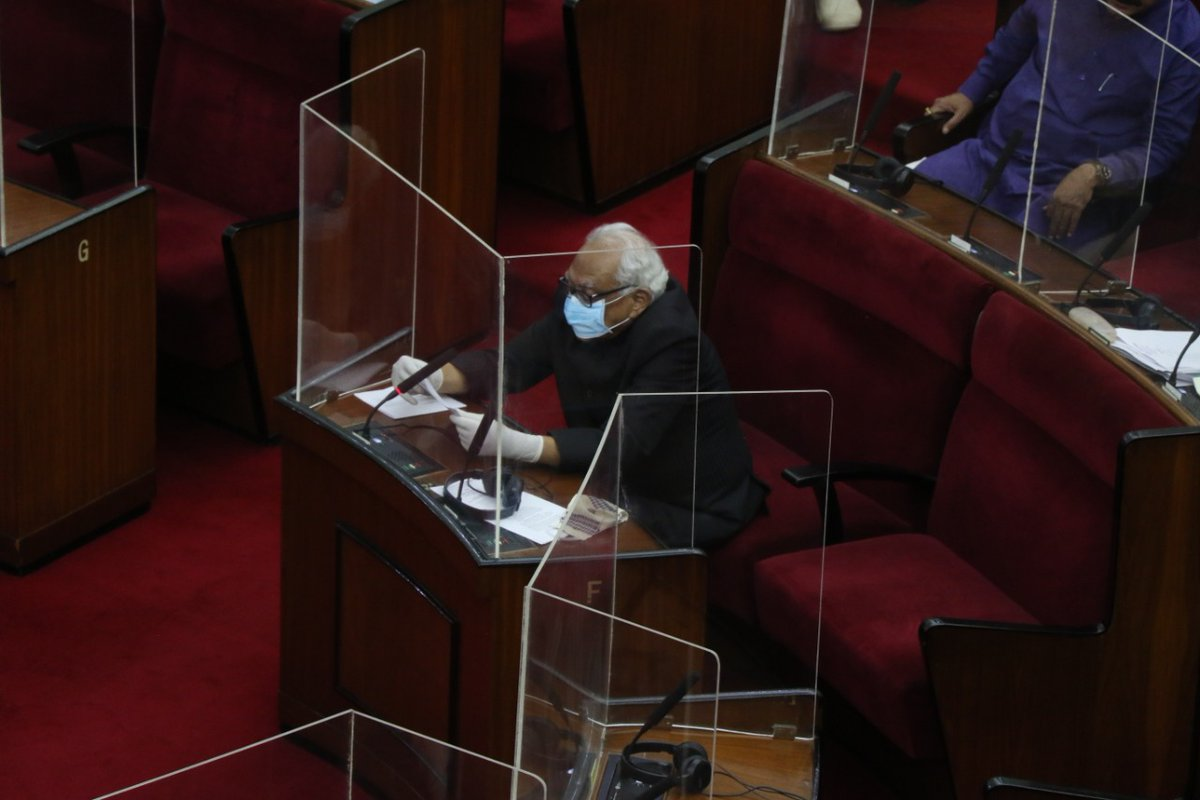
Narashingha Mishra attending the monsoon session of Odisha assembly during the COVID-19 pandemic

He switched from the Communist Party to the Janata Dal in 1990. He was first elected to the Orissa Assembly in 1990 from the Janata Dal from Loisingha under the Bolangir district. Fortunately the Janata Dal came to power in Orissa the same year. He was appointed as Cabinet Minister in Law Department. One of his major contributions as a minister was the Special Courts Bill, with which Odisha aimed to fight corruption in high places. He again won in 1995 as a Janata Dal MLA of Binika. This happened despite Congress victory in Orissa in 1995. When JD split in 1997, he went to JD(S). In 2000, Congress lost to BJD-BJP alliance. He lost the same year. So then he joined Congress.

After losing the 2000 elections he fought back from Loisinga in 2004 and was the Deputy Leader of Orissa Congress. He did not contest in state level election in 2009. He moved to national level, aiming to be the MP of Bolangir but he lost to BJD. He is currently a part-time member of the Law Commission of India. He returned to state level elections in 2014. He this time didn't contest from Loisinga but moved to Balangir Town. He won the Balangir Sadar constituency twice in 2014 and 2019 from Congress, defeating the BJD veteran A.U. Singh Deo twice. He was the leader of principal opposition in Odisha from 2014 to 2019.

Earlier he was silent regarding the issues of separate Koshal state but from some years it is seen from his press conference that he is opining for a separate state if injustice is done to western part of Odisha. Later he became very vocal for Koshal issue. He paused his political career in 2024 by not contesting anywhere but he is still in Congress.

== Professional ==
- Member, Odisha State Bar Council from 1985 to 1990.
- Member 19th law commission, Govt. of India.
- Vice President of State unit of Indo-Soviet-Cultural Society.
- Vice President of State unit of International Peace Council.
- Chairman, Special Committee constituted by Odisha Legislative Assembly.
- Chairman, Special Committee to examine and suggest necessary amendment to the existing Rules of Procedure and Conduct of Business in the Odisha Legislative Assembly.
- Member of Public Accounts Committee

== See also ==
Law Commission of India
