= Sambalpuri drama =

Sambalpuri drama are a typical drama performance in Sambalpuri language of Odisha, India.

== Origin ==
The "naach gaana" in the streets of villages of the western Orissa regions are traditionally based on the plots of Ramayana, Mahabharata and other religion epics. During the early days Ram-Parshuram bhet was recognized as a form of street play. Currently "Ramlila" is performed in several villages. Majority of the dramas are performed in open air auditoriums where people stand surrounding the stage to observe. The great visionary Pundit Prayag Dutt Joshi wrote one drama Kapat Biha in 1936 and it was staged in Raj Khariar in that year.

== Theatre and organizations ==
- Sambalpuri drama are organized at different parts of Odisha and showcase the Sambalpuri drama theater tradition. Generally, artists from different parts of Odisha and other parts of the country are invited for this festival.
- Sambalpuri Naatbadi a state level drama festival is also organized at Sadeipali, Balangir during the month of January. Various cultural organizations of Odisha participate in the week-long Sambalpuri drama festival.
- Matkhai Mahotsav, a multilingual theatre festival is also organized in Balangir town. This festival brings artists and cultural troupes from all part of India together. Various local cultural troupes also perform folk musics viz. Ghubukudu and Kendra.
- Yuba Udayan Association, Jharuapara, Sambalpur started in 1997 to bring all the theatre activists together.
- Veer Surendra Sai All Odisha Sambalpuri Drama Competition was born for the revival of Sambalpuri drama activities by Yuba Udayan Association, Jharuapara, Sambalpur. In the inaugural year only 19 plays were presented and the next fourteen years witnessed 455 plays being staged. Sambalpuri theatre has engaged scripts, directors and artists to work for performing these dramas.
- Belpahar Uchhab "Machan" 18 to 22 Dec every year
- Belpahar Uchhab Machan National Theatre festival. The festival started in 2004.
- NATYA KRANTI Balangir. A 40-year-old drama organization started by Abdul Jamal khan. Kranti Balangir staged play's all over India. NATYA KRANTI stage 3-4 plays every year. One of the most popular plays by Natya Kranti is Bigul (the beginning) by Akram Durrani.

== Notable Sambalpuri Odia Drama ==
- "PACHEN" (The Farmer's Stick)
- Devi Ambalika (Kranti balangir)
- "Badkha Dada" Mirror Theatre
- Kuili Kuili Kia Raja
- Maet Maa (mother earth)
- Dwithiya Gandhi
- Bhat Muthe
- Lal Paen (The Red Water)
- Pachen
- Dhankhed
- File
- Tangar
- Aljhat
- E Phul
- Pari
- Ram Naam Sat Rahe
- Aahinsaka
- Bhok
- Antankbad (Kranti Balangir)
- Tanko
- Guhu
- Kurey Phular Katha
- Antra (Kranti balangir)
- Ubelia Utpat
- Siluan
- Angen
- Mousumi (A Symbolic Pay on Monsoon wind)
- Tumar aamar Katha
- Surusthi
- Aintha
- Ujaar
- Gadhar Katha
- Kua ra Gharen Kuili Raja
- Luhur Rang
- Vikash (The Development)
- Tokemara
- Khaman Rani
- Lahanger
- Tokemara
- Tirkut
- Bhanga Kachen Chaka Jan
- Bigul By Akram durrani (Kranti Balangir)
- Badkha Dada by Mirror Theatre, Belpahar
- April-27 (a Sambalpuri Solo play) by Mirror Theatre, Belpahar
- Black Paradise by Akram durrani(Kranti balangir)
- Swayam Brahma by Akram durrani (Kranti balangir )
- Adham
- Chhuchhata
- Asha
- Ramarajya
- Laal chithi
- Debri gaal
- Time-up By Akram Durrani (Mime)
- Rikshabala
- Joker
- Vaisnaba Janato
- Tar sesh Ichha
- Santha Kabi Bhima Bhoi
- Sampannata(Rise of unbroken)

written and directed by Akram durrani.  Kranti Balangir
