= Kanak Vardhan Singh Deo =

Indian politician

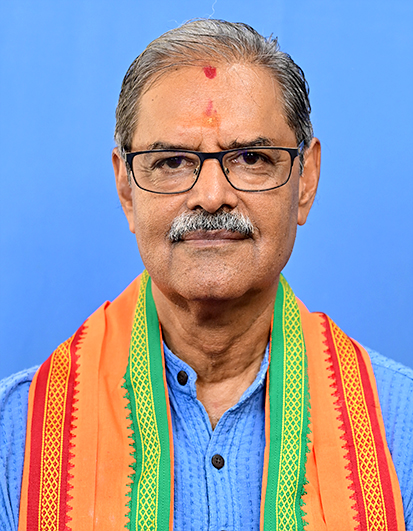

5th Deputy Chief Minister of Odisha
- Incumbent
- Assumed office 12 June 2024 Serving with Pravati Parida
- Governor: Kambhampati Hari Babu
- Chief Minister: Mohan Charan Majhi
- Ministry and Departments: Agriculture and Farmer’s Empowerment; Energy
- Preceded by: Basant Kumar Biswal (2000)

Minister of Urban Development Government of Odisha
- In office 18 May 2004 – 9 March 2009
- Chief Minister: Naveen Patnaik
- Preceded by: Samir Dey
- Succeeded by: Naveen Patnaik

Minister of Public Enterprises Government of Odisha
- In office 6 August 2002 – 9 March 2009
- Chief Minister: Naveen Patnaik
- Preceded by: Bed Prakash Agarwal
- Succeeded by: Naveen Patnaik

Minister of Industry Government of Odisha
- In office 6 March 2000 – 16 May 2004
- Chief Minister: Naveen Patnaik
- Preceded by: Amarnath Pradhan
- Succeeded by: Biswabhusan Harichandan

Member of Odisha Legislative Assembly
- Incumbent
- Assumed office 4 Jun 2024
- Preceded by: Saroj Kumar Meher
- Constituency: Patnagarh
- In office 1995–2019
- Preceded by: Bibekananda Meher
- Succeeded by: Saroj Kumar Meher
- Constituency: Patnagarh

Personal details
- Born: 14 June 1956 (age 70) Bolangir, Odisha, India
- Party: Bharatiya Janata Party
- Spouse: Sangeeta Kumari Singh Deo
- Children: Nivritti Lakshyaraj Mewar
- Parent: Raj Raj Singh Deo (father)
- Relatives: Lakshyaraj Singh Mewar (son-in-law); Ananga Udaya Singh Deo (paternal uncle); Kalikesh Narayan Singh Deo (paternal cousin); Arkesh Singh Deo (paternal cousin)
- Education: Bachelor of Arts
- Alma mater: Delhi University

Kanak Vardhan Singh Deo is an Indian politician from Odisha and a member of the former royal family of the princely state of Patna, Bolangir. A member of the Bharatiya Janata Party (BJP), Deo is serving as the 5th Deputy Chief Minister of Odisha, holding the portfolios of the Ministry of Agriculture and Farmers' Empowerment and the Ministry of Energy since 2024 under Mohan Majhi. He is also a member of the National Executive of the BJP. Deo is the grandson of former Chief Minister of Odisha, Rajendra Narayan Singh Deo.

== Early life and background ==
Kanak Vardhan Singh Deo is a member of the former royal family of Patna, which is now in Odisha. He is the son of the former Member of Parliament from Bolangir, Raj Raj Singh Deo. Deo is a grandson of former Chief Minister of Odisha, Rajendra Narayan Singh Deo and Kailash Kumari Devi, daughter of Maharaja Bhupinder Singh of Patiala. Deo completed his B.A. from Delhi University.

== Career ==
Deo was a Cabinet Minister of Industry and Public Enterprise from 2000 to 2004 and from 2004 to 2009 and also served as Urban Development and Public Enterprise minister in the Naveen Patnaik government until Patnaik left the National Democratic Alliance in 2009.

Deo won the 2024 Odisha Legislative Assembly election representing Bharatiya Janata Party (BJP) from Patnagarh Assembly Constituency in Bolangir district. He is also a former president of BJP Odisha.

On 12 June 2024, he took oath as Deputy Chief Minister of Odisha along with Pravati Parida and Mohan Charan Majhi as Chief Minister at Janata Maidan, Bhubaneswar. Governor Raghubar Das administered their oath. Prime Minister Narendra Modi, Home Minister Amit Shah, Defence Minister Rajnath Singh, along with Chief Ministers of 10 BJP-ruled states were present.

== Personal life ==
His wife, Sangeeta Kumari Singh Deo, was a Member of Parliament of the 12th, 13th, 14th and 16th Lok Sabha of India. They have a daughter, Nivritti Kumari. Nivritti is married to businessman and member of the former Mewar royal family, Lakshyaraj Singh Mewar, the son of Arvind Singh Mewar, who was also a businessman.
