= Bhupinder Singh of Patiala =

Maharaja of Patiala (r. 1900–1938) and cricket player

Sir Bhupinder Singh GCSI GCIE GCVO GBE
- Maharaja of Patiala (more)
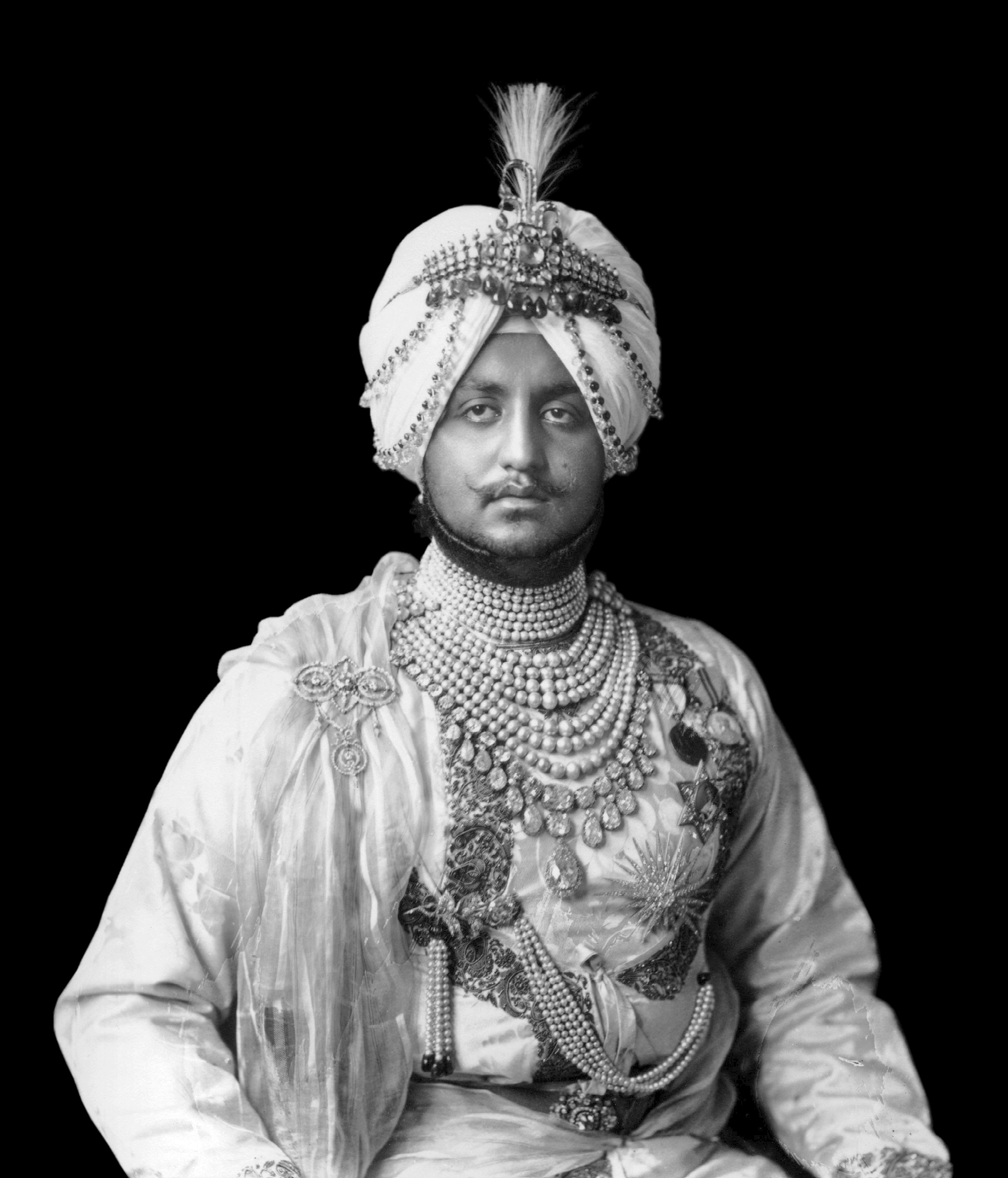
- Bhupinder Singh, c. 1911

Maharaja of Patiala
- Reign: 8 November 1900 – 23 March 1938
- Predecessor: Rajinder Singh
- Successor: Yadavindra Singh
- Minister of State: See list: Liaqat Hayat Khan
- Born: 12 October 1891; Moti Bagh Palace, Patiala, Patiala State, Punjab Province, British India
- Died: 23 March 1938 (aged 46); Patiala, Patiala State, Punjab Province, British India
- Spouse: 10
- Issue Detail: Estimated at 52, including Yadavindra Singh and Bhalindra Singh
- Dynasty: Phulkian
- Father: Rajinder Singh
- Mother: Jasmer Kaur Manshahia
- Religion: Sikhism
- Cricket career

Cricket information

Domestic team information
- Years: Team
- Hindus
- Marylebone Cricket Club

Career statistics
Competition	FC
Matches	27
Runs scored	643
Batting average	17.37
100s/50s	0/1
Top score	83
Balls bowled	72
Wickets	2
Bowling average
5 wickets in innings	0
10 wickets in match	0
Best bowling	2-40
Catches/stumpings	4/0
- Source: ESPNcricinfo

Bhupinder Singh of Patiala

2nd President of Indian Olympic Association
- In office 1928 - 1938
- Preceded by: Dorabji Tata
- Succeeded by: Yadavindra Singh

Sir Bhupinder Singh (12 October 1891 – 23 March 1938) was the Maharaja of Patiala and a cricket player. Singh's reign as Maharaja of the princely state of Patiala, in British India, lasted from 1900 to 1938. He was a member of the Phulkian dynasty. During his reign, Singh was most noted for his extravagance, contributions to sports, and for being an ally to the British Raj. Many of Singh's children married notable individuals and through his children, Singh has many notable descendants.

== Early life and background ==
Bhupinder Singh was born on 12 October 1891 in Moti Bagh Palace, Patiala. Singh was born into the Jat Sikh Phulkian dynasty and Sidhu clan. He was educated at Aitchison College in Lahore. Singh was sent to the princely state of Dholpur, supposedly because of threats to his life due to intrigues in the Patiala court. He returned to Patiala in the beginning of 1900, only months before his father's death.

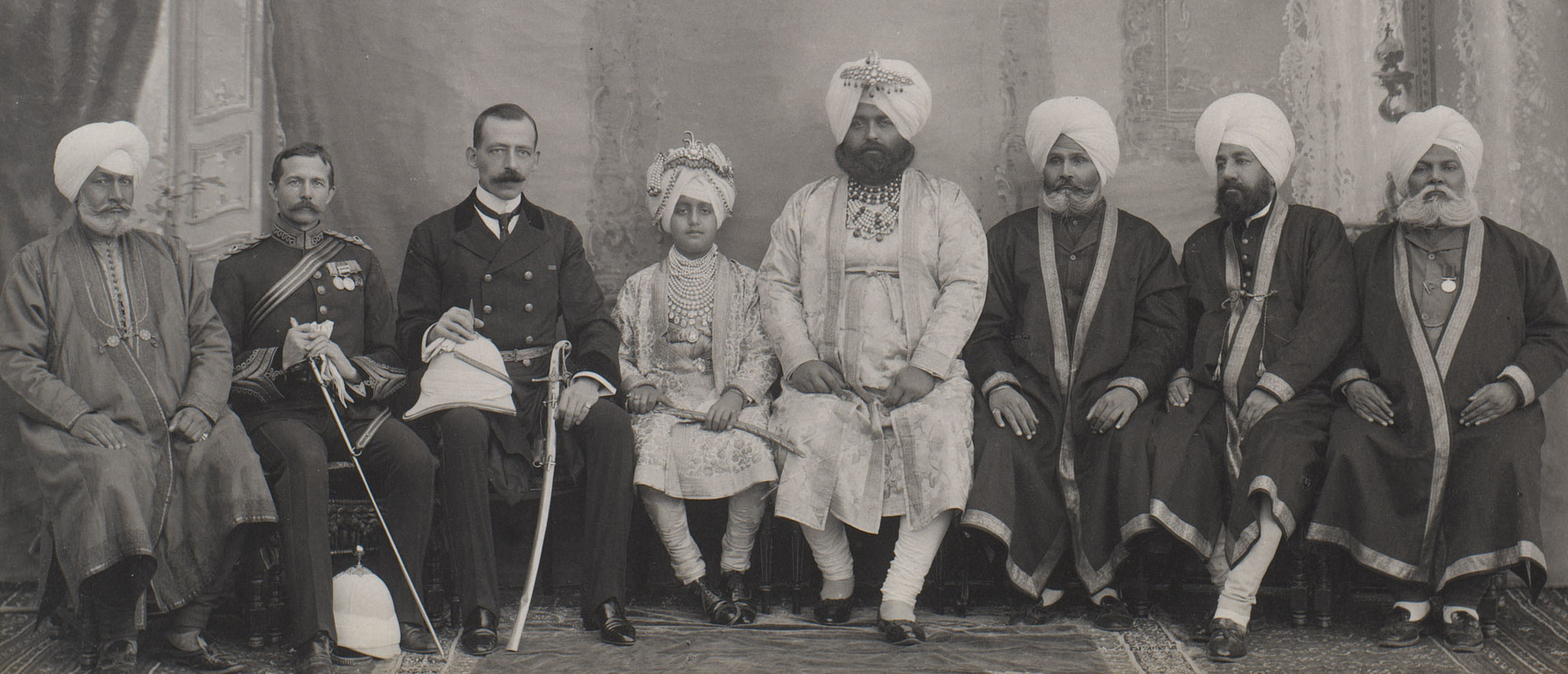
Photograph of an adolescent Maharaja Bhupinder Singh of Patiala State and suite, Bourne & Shepherd, 1903

At the age of 9, Singh succeeded as Maharaja of Patiala State upon the death of his father, Maharaja Rajinder Singh, on 9 November 1900. Rajinder Singh had died due to alcoholism; Singh's mother, Jasmer Kaur, had died some years earlier of tuberculosis. A Council of Regents ruled in his name until he took partial power shortly before his 18th birthday on 1 October 1909, and was invested with full powers by the Viceroy of India, the 4th Earl of Minto, on 3 November 1910.

== Reign ==
=== Administration and foreign policies ===
Singh was well known for the construction of buildings with bold architectural designs in Patiala, including the Shri Kali Devi Temple. Other buildings he constructed include Chail View Palace in the summer retreat of Kandaghat; Chail Palace; and Oak Over and Cedar Lodge in Shimla, which are now the residences of the Chief Minister of Himachal Pradesh and the Punjab State Guest House, respectively. He had a unique monorail system built in Patiala, known as Patiala State Monorail Trainways. Singh founded the State Bank of Patiala in 1917. Although Patiala was a 17-gun salute state, Singh himself received a personal 19-gun salute. Singh was a member of Freemasonry and in 1916, he consecrated a Masonic lodge in Patiala.

He represented India at the League of Nations, was Chancellor of the Chamber of Princes for 10 years between 1926 and 1938, and was a representative at the Round Table Conference. During his tenure as Chancellor of the Chamber of Princes, Singh fought for the rights of princely states in various jurisdictional and administrative matters. However, his proposals were rejected by the British Raj and even the larger 21-gun-salute states did not join him in his efforts. In one of the elections for the chancellorship, Singh's cousin Udai Bhan Singh, the Maharaj-Rana of Dholpur, challenged him and was defeated. Prior to the election, Singh wrote to Udai Bhan, stating that Udai Bhan would cause a family feud if he continued to challenge Singh, his cousin, in the elections. Despite Udai Bhan having the support of the British Raj's political departments, including that of the British Residents in many of the Indian Princely States, Singh managed to win the election by using his wealth to secure votes and even provided his election canvassing committee with the use of his private plane to court support from other rulers.

=== Military support ===
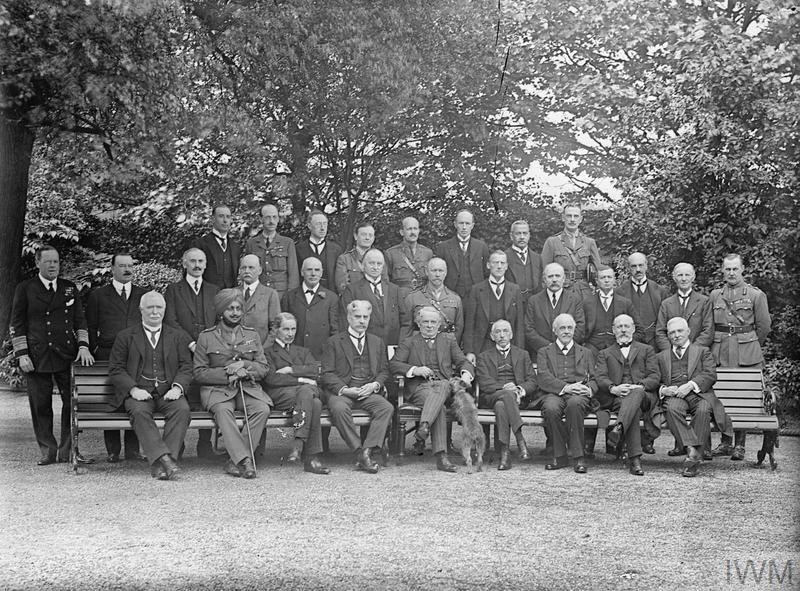
The British Empire's Imperial War Cabinet in 1918. Singh is seated second from left

Singh served on the General Staff in France, Belgium, Italy and Palestine in the First World War as an honorary lieutenant-colonel, and was promoted honorary major general in 1918 and honorary lieutenant-general in 1931. During the First World War, Singh also served on the Imperial War Cabinet in 1918 and on the Imperial War Conference. He was awarded 43 medals during the First World War. Most of the buildings of the Chail Military School, in Himachal Pradesh, were donated by Singh to the Government of India.

== Sports ==
Singh was noted both as a sportsman and a patron of sports. He was captain of the Indian cricket team that visited England in 1911, and played in 27 first-class cricket matches between 1915 and 1937. For the season of 1926/27, he played as member of the Marylebone Cricket Club. He was selected as the captain of India on its first Test tour of England in 1932, but dropped out for reasons of health two weeks before departure and Natwarsinhji Bhavsinhji, the Maharaja of Porbandar, took over.

Singh had a key role in the founding of the Board of Control for Cricket in India (BCCI), the national sports administration body for cricket in India, and he donated the Ranji Trophy in honour of Maharaja Ranjitsinhji of Nawanagar. Singh's cricket and polo teams, Patiala XI and Patiala Tigers, were among the best in India. He also served as the President of the Indian Olympic Association from 1928 to 1938.

== Extravagance ==
Singh is largely noted and remembered for his extravagance. During his life, Singh developed a reputation for being a generous host, throwing lavish parties, and entertaining doctors, artists and people of repute from around the world. He was noted for collecting various items, including cars, jewels, medals, paintings, watches, wines, and spending sprees in Europe.

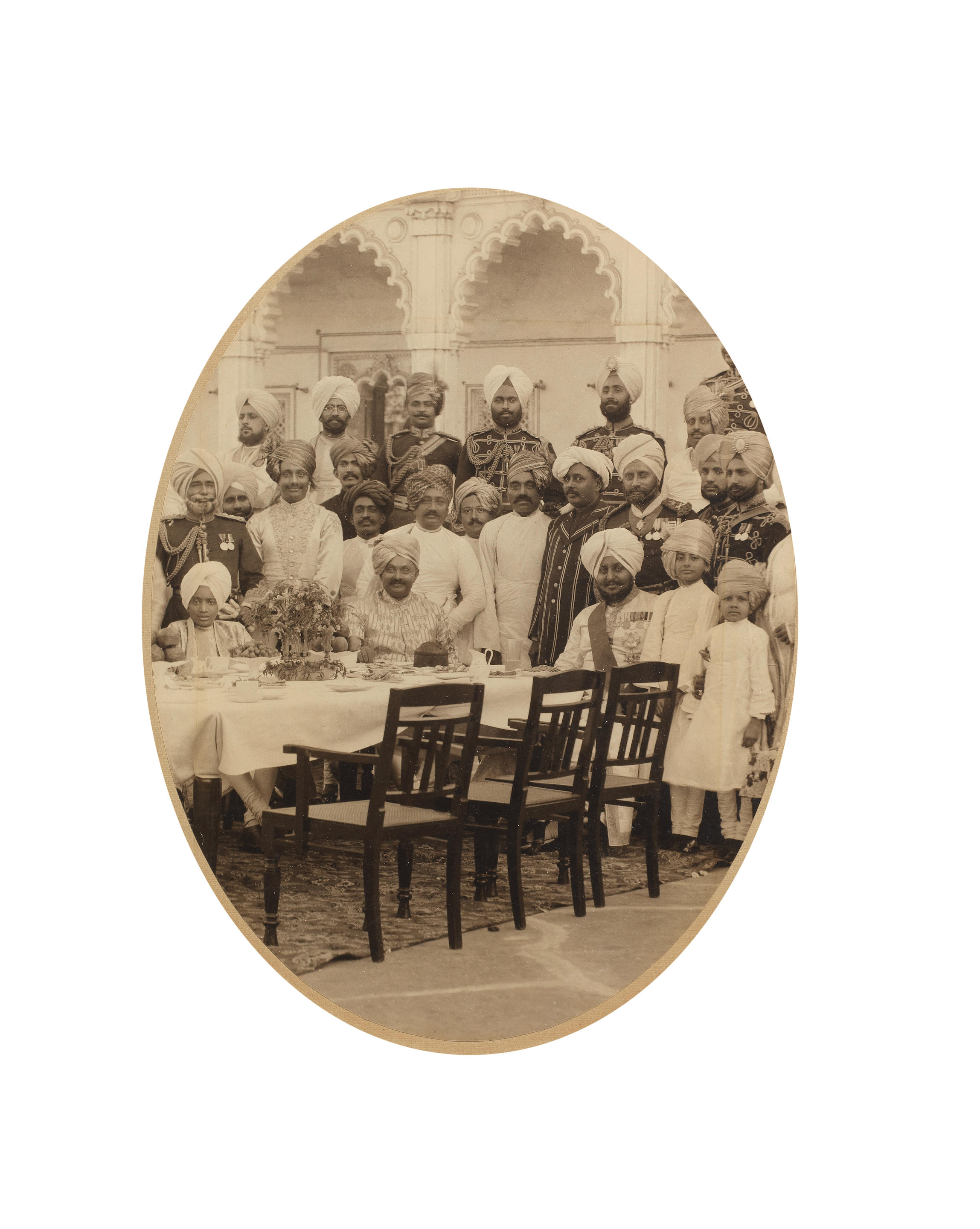
A group photograph of Singh (seated right) with the cricketer, Maharaja Ranjitsinhji of Nawanagar, known as Ranji, (seated near left) and other guests and servants. Patiala, circa 1910

In 1925, Singh placed the largest single order to Cartier to date: the Patiala Necklace, worth ₹1,000 million (equivalent to ₹230 billion, US$2.5 billion or €2.2 billion in 2026). One of his wives, Maharani Bakhtawar Kaur, presented Queen Mary of the United Kingdom with a necklace on behalf of the Ladies of India during the Delhi Durbar of 1911. He was also known for an exceptional collection of medals, believed to be the world's largest at the time. Singh also owned a fleet of 44 Rolls-Royce cars. He was the first Indian to own a private plane and built an airstrip in Patiala. He also owned properties in Mumbai and Juhu.

== Personal life and family ==
Singh married ten times and had a harem of 350 concubines. He fathered 88 children, 52 of whom survived to adulthood. Singh was also reportedly a Tantric and he built a temple to the Hindu Goddess Kali, named Kali Devi Temple, in which he installed a six feet tall statue of Kali that was brought from Bengal to Patiala.

=== Wives and concubines ===
Some of Singh's wives and concubines are:

- Maharani Sri Bakhtawar Kaur Sahiba (1892–1960). Daughter of Sardar Gurnam Singh, Sardar Bahadur of Sangrur, OBI. Married Bhupinder Singh in 1908.
- Maharani Jaswant Kaur. Her brother, Gian Singh Rarewala, served as the first Chief Minister of the former state of Patiala and East Punjab States Union (PEPSU), and as the President of the Shiromani Gurdwara Parbandhak Committee.
- Maharani Vimala Kaur Sahiba (original name Dhan Kaur) of Ubbewal (1906–1992). Married Maharaja Bhupinder Singh in 1920, OBI.
- Maharani Yashoda Devi.
- Maharani Manjula Devi of Darkoti.
- 3 other wives who were members of the royal family of Darkoti.

=== Children ===
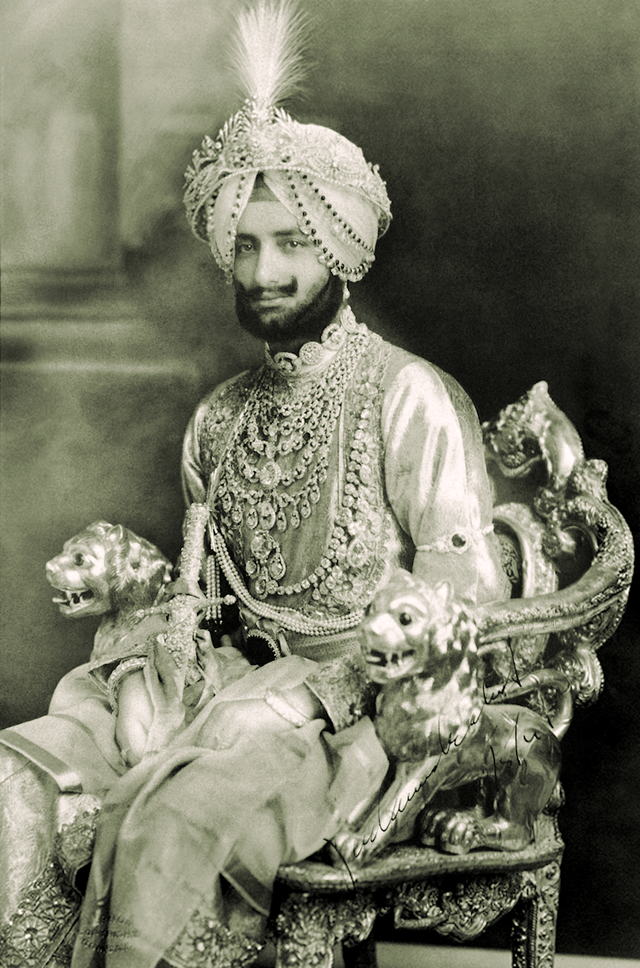
Yadavindra Singh, Singh's eldest son and successor as the Maharaja of Patiala, circa 1930s

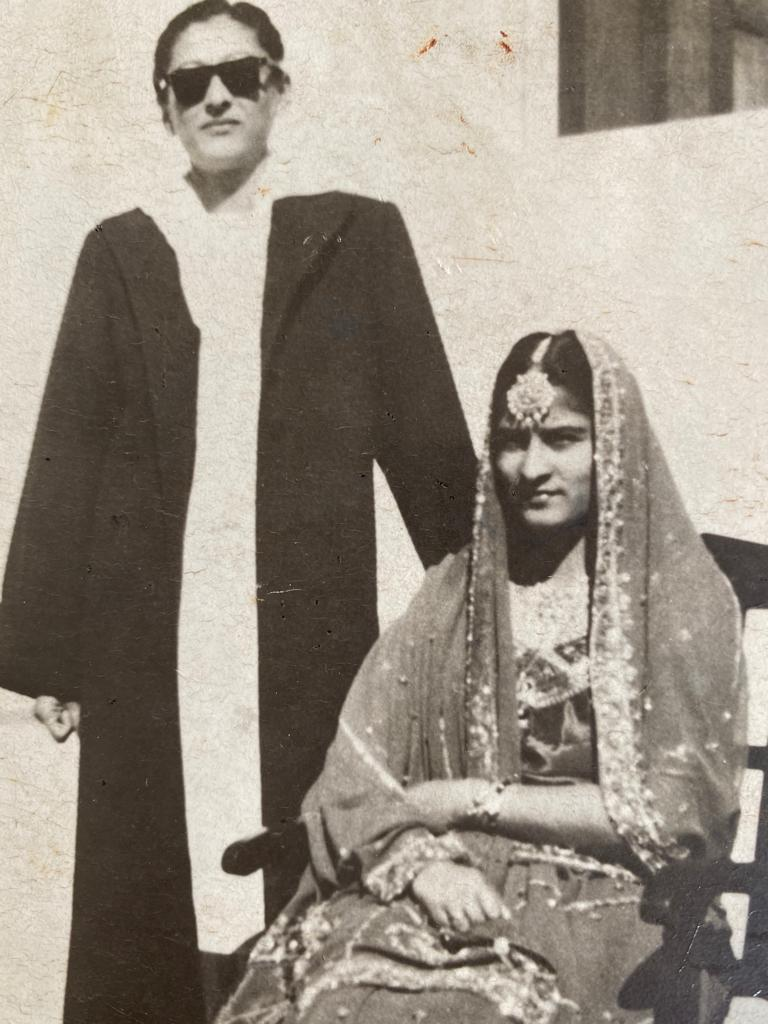
Manjula Devi of Darkoti, one of Singh's wives, and their daughter, Naginder Kumari Khanna, circa 1950s. Naginder married Vipin Khanna. Darkoti was a Kachhwaha Rajput ruled princely state, founded in the 11th century, whose rulers were directly descended from the ruling house of the Kingdom of Amber.

Singh's children included:

- Yadavindra Singh (1914 – 1974). Yadvindra became the Maharaja on 23 March 1938. He was the last Maharaja of Patiala, agreeing to the incorporation of Patiala State into the newly independent India on 5 May 1948. Yadvindra later became a sports administrator and diplomat, serving in various roles, including as the Indian delegate to the United Nations General Assembly, and as Indian Ambassador to Italy and later, to the Netherlands. His wife, Mehtab Kaur, was a politician who served as a Member of Parliament in both the Rajya Sabha and the Lok Sabha.
- Bhalindra Singh (1919 – 1992). He was a sports administrator and politician. His positions included being a member of the International Olympic Committee (IOC) and President of the Asian Games Federation and the Indian Olympic Association. He also served as the Member of the Legislative Assembly from the Patiala Assembly constituency. He married Pushpa Kumari, the daughter of the ruler of Sahanpur.
- Yadhuvansh Kumari (1922 – 2006). She married Govind Singh, the son of Raja Brijnath Singh of Maihar.
- Raghavendra Singh (1923 – unknown). He was married to Sumitra Raje Holkar, the daughter of Maharaja Tukojirao Holkar III of Indore and the sister of Maharaja Yashwant Rao Holkar II.
- Mrigendra Singh (1929 – 2014). He was a scholar and a musician.
- Kailash Kumari Devi (1934 – 2004). She married Rajendra Narayan Singh Deo, former Chief Minister of Odisha.
- Kunwar Devinder Singh (1936 – 2019). He married Amarjit Kaur, a former member of the Rajya Sabha, former Chairperson of the Central Social Welfare Board under the Ministry of Women and Child Development, and the daughter of Raghbir Singh, who served as Chief Minister of the former state of PEPSU.
- Naginder Kumari Khanna (1937 – 2012). She married Vipin Khanna, a businessman and financier who was noted for his business interests in the arms industry.
- Amrit Kumari Khanna. She married Ravi Khanna, a former Indian Army officer and Vipin Khanna's brother.
- Shailendra Kumari. She married Himmat Singh, the younger son Maharaja Umaid Singh of Jodhpur and a member of the Rathore dynasty.
- Bhavenesh Kumari (d. 2023). She was a lawyer and a Supreme Court of India advocate.
- Kumudesh Bhandari. She married Romesh Bhandari, a diplomat and administrator who served in various positions, including as Foreign Secretary, Lieutenant Governor of Delhi, and Governor of Uttar Pradesh.
- Kanwar Kumar Indira Singh. He owned tea estates and real estate.
- Danesh Kumari. She married Kumar Aman Singh, a member of the Bijawar royal family.
- Brijindra Singh. He was a lieutenant colonel in the Indian Army.
- Kamlesh Kumari. She married Jasbir Singh, a businessman with business interests in real estate and transport.

=== Other relatives ===
Singh's younger brother was Birendra Singh. Birendra Singh's daughter and Singh's niece, Naresh Inder Kumari, married Hardev Singh Chhina, an Indian Administrative Service officer who served as the Chief Secretary of Punjab. The son of Naresh Inder Kumari and Hardev Singh Chhina, Paramdev Singh Chhina, served as the Additional Advocate General of Punjab. Singh's cousin was Udai Bhan Singh, the Maharaj-Rana of Dholpur. His cousin from the Patiala family, Mahesh Inder Singh, was a Member of the Punjab Legislative Assembly and a Freemason who served as the Worshipful Master of the Masonic lodge in Patiala.

== Notable descendants ==
Through his children, Singh has many notable descendants, including:

- Amarinder Singh
- Ananga Udaya Singh Deo
- Arvind Khanna
- Jagat Singh
- Kalikesh Narayan Singh Deo
- Kanak Vardhan Singh Deo
- Raj Raj Singh Deo
- Randhir Singh
- Rajeshwari Kumari
- Raninder Singh

== Death ==
Singh's health began deteriorating, and he died on 23 March 1938 due to ill health. He was succeeded on the throne of Patiala by Yadavindra Singh. To mark Singh's death, a state-wide hartal for five days was announced, during which all offices, schools, colleges, and other public institutions were to remain closed, and, throughout the period of mourning, flags at all forts and public buildings in the state were to be hoisted at half-mast.

== Titles ==
- 1891–1900: Sri Yuvaraja Sahib Bhupinder Singhji
- 1900–1911: His Highness Farzand-i-Khas-i-Daulat-i-Inglishia, Mansur-i-Zaman, Amir ul-Umara, Maharajadhiraja Raj Rajeshwar, 108 Sri Maharaja-i-Rajgan, Maharaja Bhupinder Singh, Mahendra Bahadur, Yadu Vansha Vatans Bhatti Kul Bushan, Maharaja of Patiala
- 1911–1914: His Highness Farzand-i-Khas-i-Daulat-i-Inglishia, Mansur-i-Zaman, Amir ul-Umara, Maharajadhiraja Raj Rajeshwar, 108 Sri Maharaja-i-Rajgan, Maharaja Sir Bhupinder Singh, Mahendra Bahadur, Maharaja of Patiala, GCIE
- 1914–1918: Lieutenant-Colonel His Highness Farzand-i-Khas-i-Daulat-i-Inglishia, Mansur-i-Zaman, Amir ul-Umara, Maharajadhiraja Raj Rajeshwar, 108 Sri Maharaja-i-Rajgan, Maharaja Sir Bhupinder Singh, Mahendra Bahadur, Maharaja of Patiala, GCIE
- 1918–1921: Major-General His Highness Farzand-i-Khas-i-Daulat-i-Inglishia, Mansur-i-Zaman, Amir ul-Umara, Maharajadhiraja Raj Rajeshwar, 108 Sri Maharaja-i-Rajgan, Maharaja Sir Bhupinder Singh, Mahendra Bahadur, Maharaja of Patiala, GCIE, GBE
- 1921–1922: Major-General His Highness Farzand-i-Khas-i-Daulat-i-Inglishia, Mansur-i-Zaman, Amir ul-Umara, Maharajadhiraja Raj Rajeshwar, 108 Sri Maharaja-i-Rajgan, Maharaja Sir Bhupinder Singh, Mahendra Bahadur, Maharaja of Patiala, GCSI, GCIE, GBE
- 1922–1931: Major-General His Highness Farzand-i-Khas-i-Daulat-i-Inglishia, Mansur-i-Zaman, Amir ul-Umara, Maharajadhiraja Raj Rajeshwar, 108 Sri Maharaja-i-Rajgan, Maharaja Sir Bhupinder Singh, Mahendra Bahadur, Maharaja of Patiala, GCSI, GCIE, GCVO, GBE
- 1931–1935: Lieutenant-General His Highness Farzand-i-Khas-i-Daulat-i-Inglishia, Mansur-i-Zaman, Amir ul-Umara, Maharajadhiraja Raj Rajeshwar, 108 Sri Maharaja-i-Rajgan, Maharaja Sir Bhupinder Singh, Mahendra Bahadur, Maharaja of Patiala, GCSI, GCIE, GCVO, GBE
- 1935–1938: Lieutenant-General His Highness Farzand-i-Khas-i-Daulat-i-Inglishia, Mansur-i-Zaman, Amir ul-Umara, Maharajadhiraja Raj Rajeshwar, 108 Sri Maharaja-i-Rajgan, Maharaja Sir Bhupinder Singh, Mahendra Bahadur, Maharaja of Patiala, GCSI, GCIE, GCVO, GBE, GCSG

== Honours ==
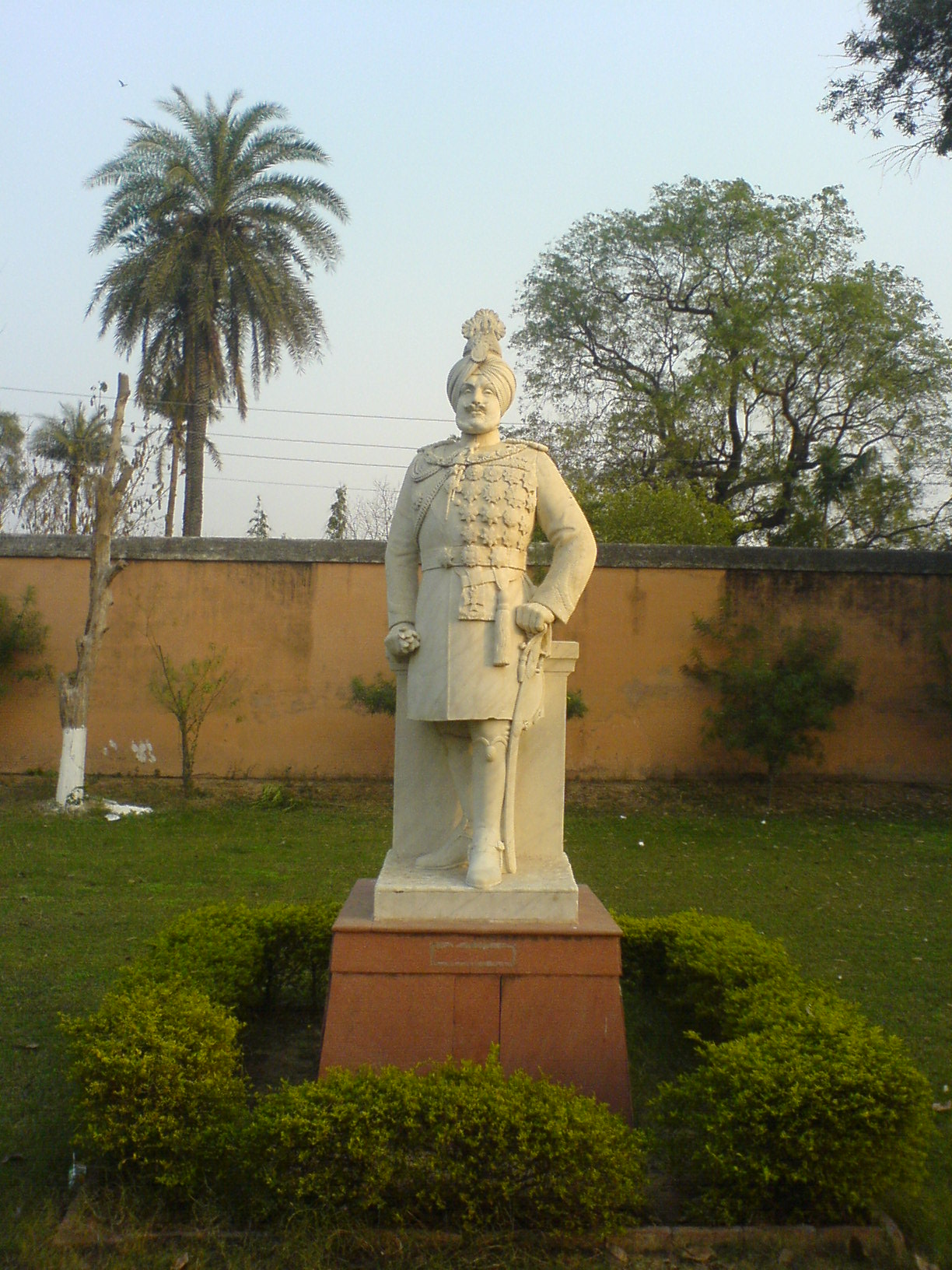
Maharaja Bhupinder Singh

(ribbon bar, as it would look today)

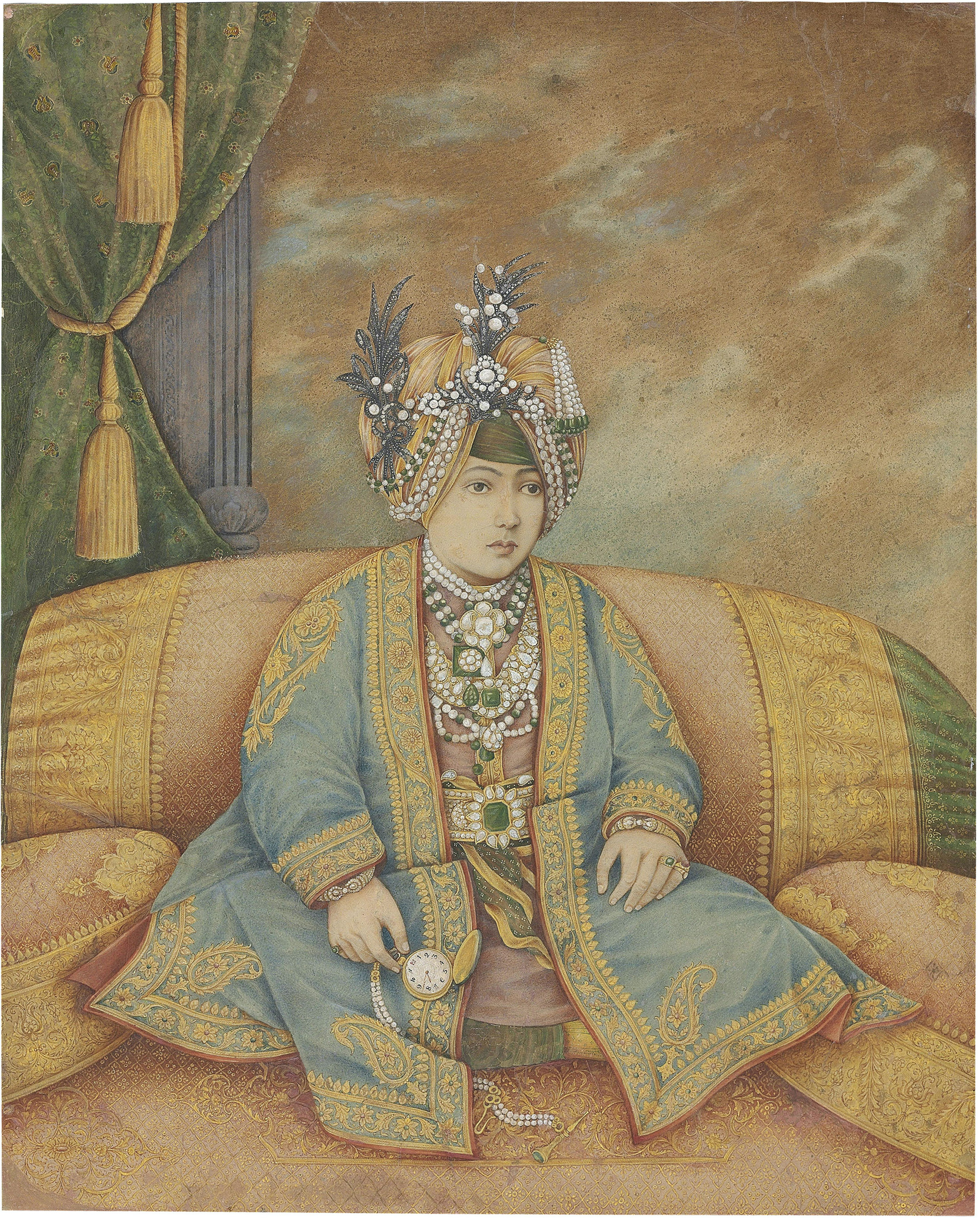
Seated painting of Singh as a young prince

=== British ===
- Delhi Durbar Gold Medal – 1903
- Delhi Durbar Gold Medal – 1911
- King George V Coronation Medal – 1911
- Knight Grand Commander of the Order of the Indian Empire (GCIE) – 1911
- 1914 Star
- British War Medal – 1918
- Victory Medal – 1918
- Mentioned in dispatches – 1919
- Knight Grand Cross of the Order of the British Empire (GBE) – 1918
- Knight Grand Commander of the Order of the Star of India (GCSI) – for war services, New Year Honours 1921
- Knight Grand Cross of the Royal Victorian Order (GCVO) – 1922
- King George V Silver Jubilee Medal – 1935
- King George VI Coronation Medal – 1937

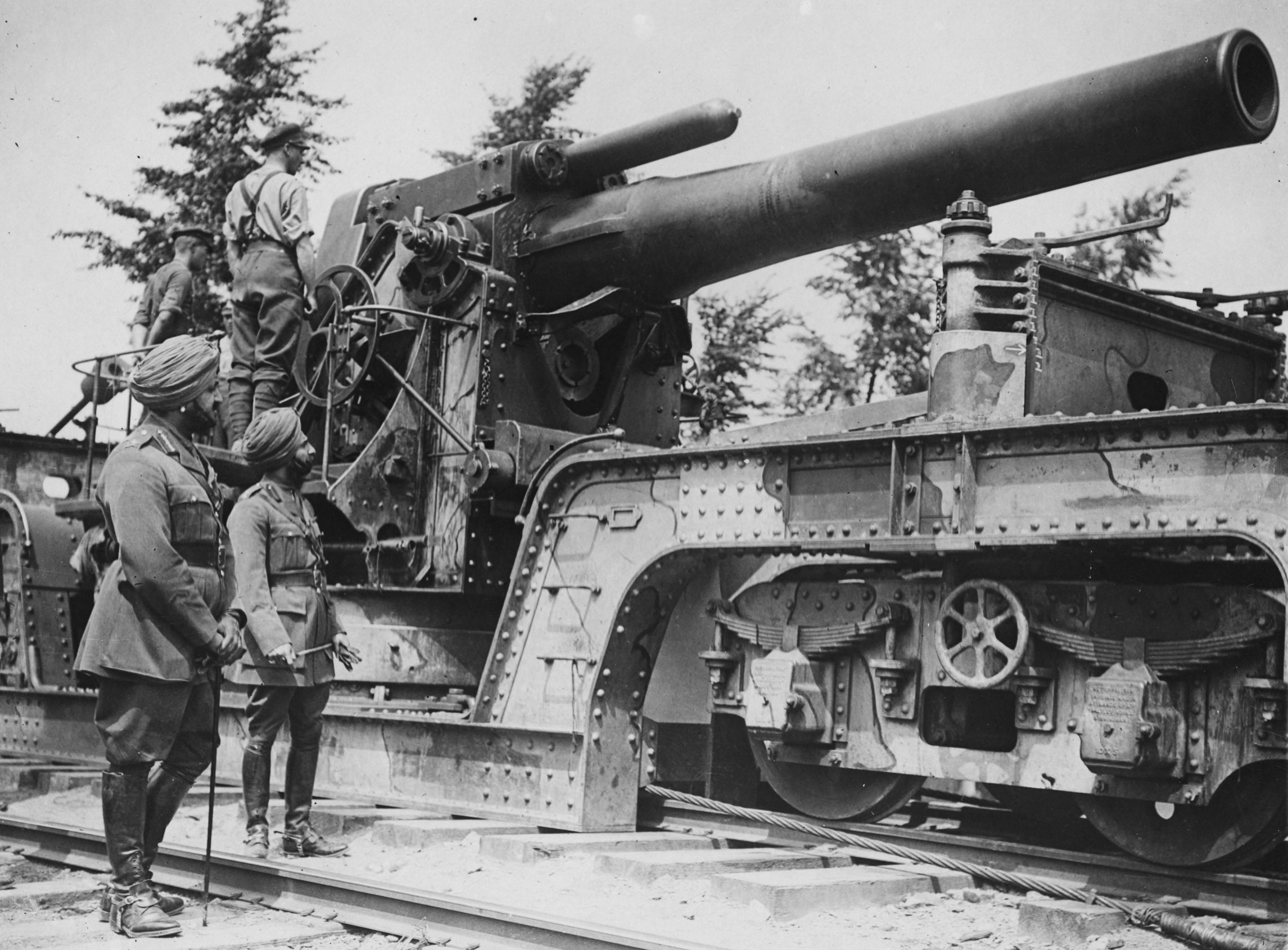
Inspecting a BL 12-inch Railway Howitzer in France, August 1918

=== Foreign ===
- Grand Cross of the Order of the Crown of Italy – 1918
- Grand Cordon of the Order of the Nile of Egypt – 1918
- Grand Cordon of the Order of Leopold of Belgium – 1918
- Grand Cross of the Order of the Crown of Romania – 1922
- Grand Cross of the Order of the Redeemer of Greece – 1926
- Grand Cross of the Order of Charles III of Spain – 1928
- Grand Cross of the Order of the White Lion of Czechoslovakia – 1930
- Grand Cross of the Legion d'Honneur of France – 1930 (Grand Officer – 1918)
- Grand Cross of the Order of Saints Maurice and Lazarus of Italy – 1935
- Grand Cross of the Order of St Gregory the Great of the Vatican – 1935
- Grand Cross of the Order of Dannebrog of Denmark

=== Other ===
- A Unani College, namely 'Bhupinder Tibbi College' was after his name at Patiala
- The Maharaja Bhupinder Singh Punjab Sports University was named after him in recognition of his contribution to the promotion of sports.

Bhupinder Singh of Patiala Phulkian Dynasty Born: 12 October 1891 Died: 23 March 1938
Regnal titles
Preceded by Rajinder Singh	Maharaja of Patiala; 1900–1938	Succeeded by Yadavindra Singh
Civic offices
New title Sir Dorabji Tata	President of the Indian Olympic Association; 1928–1938	Succeeded by Yadavindra Singh
