= Loisingha Assembly constituency =

Assembly constituency in Odisha

Coordinates: 20.86°N 83.51°E

Loisingha
- Constituency No. 66 for the Odisha Legislative Assembly

Constituency details
- Country: India
- Region: East India
- State: Odisha
- Division: Northern Division
- District: Balangir
- Lok Sabha constituency: Bolangir
- Established: 1957
- Total electors: 2,45,851 (Note: as on 2024) (Note: as data published by election commission)
- Reservation: SC

Member of Legislative Assembly
- 17th Odisha Legislative Assembly
- Incumbent Mukesh Mahaling
- Party: Bharatiya Janata Party
- Elected year: 2024

Loisingha is a Vidhan Sabha constituency of Balangir district, Odisha.

This constituency includes Loisingha block, Puintala block and Agalpur block.

== Elected members ==
Vote share of winning candidates
2024	44.32%
2019	39.82%
2014	40.51%
2009	34.40%
2004	29.70%
2000	51.82%
1995	40.02%
1990	74.55%
1985	65.37%
1980	63.66%
1977	44.60%

Since its formation in 1957, 16 elections were held till date.

Elected members from the Loisingha constituency are:

Year	Member	Party
2024	Mukesh Mahaling	Bharatiya Janata Party
2019	Mukesh Mahaling	Bharatiya Janata Party
2014	Jogendra Behera	Biju Janata Dal
2009	Ramakanta Seth	Biju Janata Dal
2004	Narasingha Mishra	Indian National Congress
2000	Balgopal Mishra	Bharatiya Janata Party
1995	Balgopal Mishra	Independent politician
1990	Narasingha Mishra	Janata Dal
1985	Balgopal Mishra	Independent politician
1980	Balgopal Mishra	Independent politician
1977	Ram Prasad Mishra	Janata Party
1974	Ananga Udaya Singh Deo	Swatantra Party
1971	Nandakishore Mishra	Swatantra Party
1967	Nandakishore Mishra	Swatantra Party
1961	Ram Prasad Mishra	Indian National Congress
1957	Ram Prasad Mishra	Ganatantra Parishad

== Election results ==
=== 2024 ===
Voting was held on 20 May 2024 in the 2nd phase of Odisha Assembly Election and the 5th phase of Indian General Election. Counting of votes was on 4 June 2024. In 2024 election, Bharatiya Janata Party candidate Mukesh Mahaling defeated Biju Janata Dal candidate Nihar Ranjan Behera by a margin of 18,190 votes.

2024 Odisha Vidhan Sabha Election, Loisingha
Party	Candidate	Votes	%	±%
BJP	Mukesh Mahaling	83,313	44.32	▲4.5
BJD	Nihar Ranjan Behara	65,123	34.64	▲2.46
INC	Om Prakash Kumbhar	32,249	17.15	▼5.23
NOTA	None of the above	2,160	1.15	▼0.03
Majority		18,190	9.67	
Turnout		1,87,992	76.47	
BJP hold				

=== 2019 ===
In 2019 election, Bharatiya Janata Party candidate Mukesh Mahaling defeated Biju Janata Dal candidate Pradeep Kumar Behera by a margin of 13,668 votes.

2019 Vidhan Sabha Election, Loisingha
Party	Candidate	Votes	%	±%
BJP	Mukesh Mahaling	71,261	39.82	
BJD	Pradeep Kumar Behera	57,593	32.18	
INC	Naba Kishor Naik	40,053	22.38	
NOTA	None of the above	1,529	0.85	
Majority		13,668	7.63	
Turnout		1,78,966	73.09	
BJP gain from BJD				

=== 2014 ===
In 2014 election, Biju Janata Dal candidate Jogendra Behera defeated Indian National Congress candidate Pandaba Chandra Kumbhar by a margin of 22,854 votes.

2014 Vidhan Sabha Election, Loisingha
Party	Candidate	Votes	%	±%
BJD	Jogendra Behera	64,340	40.51	
INC	Pandaba Chandra Kumbhar	41486	26.12	
BJP	Paramananda Seth	38,732	24.39	
NOTA	None of the above	1,737	1.09	−
Majority		22,854	14.39	11.55
Turnout		1,58,822	75.7	3.63
Registered electors		2,09,804		
BJD hold				

=== 2009 ===
In 2009 election, Biju Janata Dal candidate Ramakanta Seth defeated Indian National Congress candidate Pandava Chandra Kumbhar by a margin of 4,093 votes.

2009 Vidhan Sabha Election, Loisingha
Party	Candidate	Votes	%	±%
BJD	Ramakanta Seth	49,959	34,40	−
INC	Pandava Chandra Kumbhar	45,566	31.56	−
BJP	Megha Kumbhar	38,261	26.50	−
Majority		4,093	2.84 (Note: % of total valid votes)	−
Turnout		1,44,381	72.07	−
BJD gain from INC		Swing	2.35 (Note: 2004 voter turnout was 69.32%)	
