= Patiala Necklace =

Diamond necklace

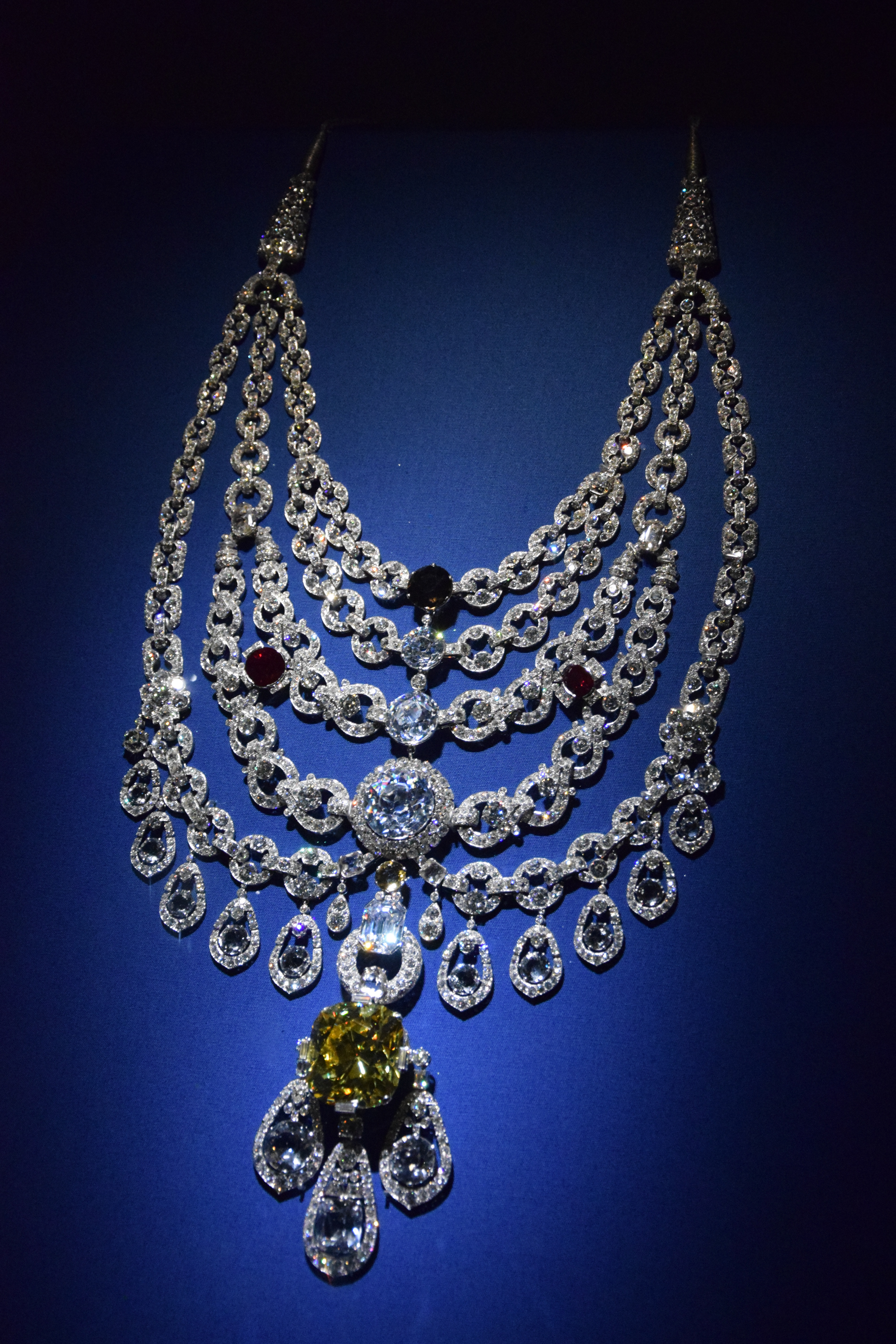
The Patiala Necklace.

The Patiala Necklace was a necklace designed and made by Cartier in 1928. It was part of the largest single order ever placed with Cartier to date, made in 1925 by the Indian royal Bhupinder Singh, the Maharaja of Patiala, for the Patiala Necklace and other jewellery worth ₹1,000 million (equivalent to ₹210 billion or €2.0 billion in 2023).

The necklace had five chains (ladi) and included a neck collar. It contained 2,930 diamonds, including as its centrepiece the world's seventh-largest diamond at the time, the De Beers. That diamond had a 428-carat pre-cut weight, and it weighed 234.65 carats in its final setting. It is the largest cushion-cut yellow diamond and the second-largest yellow faceted diamond in the world. The necklace also contained seven other large diamonds ranging from 18 to 73 carats, and a number of Burmese rubies.

== History ==
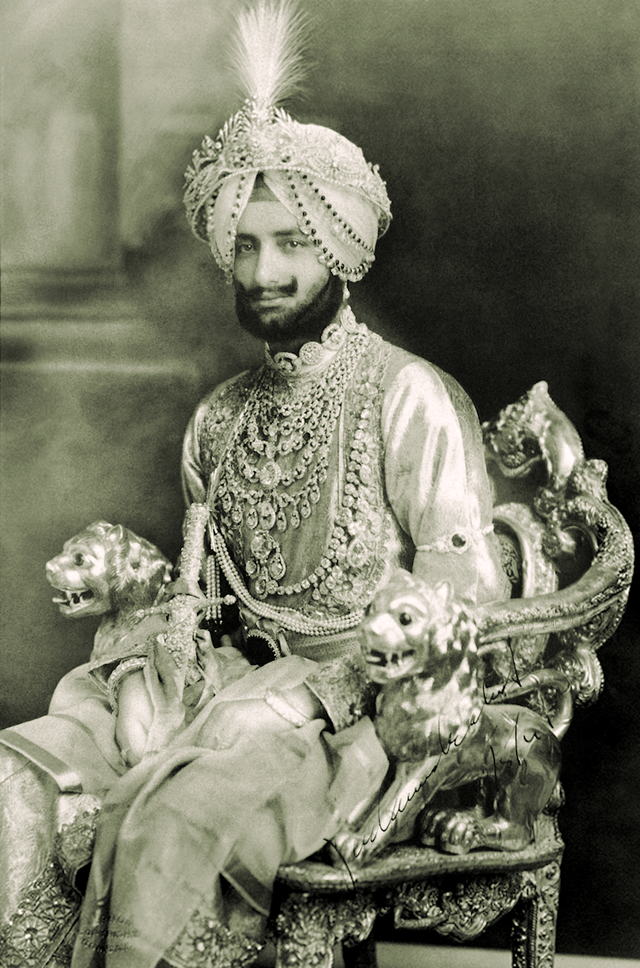
Maharaja Yadavindra Singh of Patiala wearing the famous "Patiala Necklace" (1930s)

In 1925, the necklace was commissioned by Bhupinder Singh of Patiala, who was the Maharaja of the princely state of Patiala.

Around 1948 it disappeared from the Royal Treasury of Patiala. It was last pictured in a 1946 photograph which depicted Yadavindra Singh, the then Maharaja and son of Bhupinder Singh, wearing the necklace.

In 1982, at the Sotheby's Patiala Royal Family auction in Geneva, the "De Beers" diamond reappeared. There, the bidding went up to $3.16 million, but it is unclear whether it met its reserve price.

In 1998, part of the necklace was found at a second-hand jewellery shop in London by Eric Nussbaum, a Cartier associate. The remaining large jewels were missing, including the Burmese rubies and the 18 to 73 carat diamonds that were mounted on a pendant. Cartier purchased the incomplete necklace and, after four years, restored it to resemble the original. They replaced the lost diamonds with cubic zirconia and synthetic diamonds, and mounted a replica of the original "De Beers" diamond.

The necklace is the subject of a documentary by Doc & Film International.

A granddaughter of Bhupinder Singh is a jeweller in California, US. In 2012, she was involved in the exhibit "Maharaja: The Splendor of India's Royal Courts" at the Asian Art Museum in San Francisco, where the recreated necklace was displayed.

In 2022, Cartier loaned the recreated necklace to YouTuber Emma Chamberlain. Chamberlain, who is a Cartier brand ambassador, received some online criticism for wearing the necklace at the Met Gala. In 2025, Diljit Dosanjh, an Indian singer and actor, requested to borrow the necklace from Cartier to wear with his outfit for the 2025 Met Gala; however, Cartier denied the request, stating that the necklace was sealed in a museum.

== See also ==
- Indian jewellery
