= Bolangir Assembly constituency =

Assembly constituency in Odisha

Coordinates: 20.70°N 83.48°E

Bolangir
- Constituency No. 68 for the Odisha Legislative Assembly

Constituency details
- Country: India
- Region: East India
- State: Odisha
- Division: Northern Division
- District: Balangir
- Lok Sabha constituency: Bolangir
- Established: 1951
- Total electors: 2,43,358 (Note: as on 2024) (Note: as data published by election commission)
- Reservation: None

Member of Legislative Assembly
- 17th Odisha Legislative Assembly
- Incumbent Kalikesh Narayan Singh Deo
- Party: Biju Janata Dal
- Elected year: 2024

Bolangir is a constituency of the Vidhan Sabha in Odisha, India. This seats falls under Bolangir District of Odisha State in India. Bolangir seat is an unreserved seat of Odisha Legislative Assembly. This constituency includes Balangir block and Deogaon block.

== Elected members ==
Vote share of winning candidates
2024	45.69%
2019	41.32%
2014	39.83%
2009	40.70%
2004	56.26%
2000	47.91%
1995	49.59%
1990	54.51%
1985	68.85%
1980	36.29%
1977	51.47%

Since its formation in 1951, 17 elections were held till date. It was a 2-member constituency for 1952 & 1957.

Elected members from the Bolangir constituency are:

Year	Member	Party
2024	Kalikesh Narayan Singh Deo	Biju Janata Dal
2019	Narasingha Mishra	Indian National Congress
2014	Narasingha Mishra	Indian National Congress
2009	Ananga Udaya Singh Deo	Biju Janata Dal
2004	Ananga Udaya Singh Deo	Biju Janata Dal
2000	Ananga Udaya Singh Deo	Biju Janata Dal
1995	Ananga Udaya Singh Deo	Janata Dal
1990	Ananga Udaya Singh Deo	Janata Dal
1985	Mahmmed Muzafer Hussain Khan	Indian National Congress
1980	Mahmmed Muzafer Hussain Khan	Indian National Congress (I)
1977	Muralidhar Guru	Janata Party
1974	Rajendra Narayan Singh Deo	Swatantra Party
1971	Rajendra Narayan Singh Deo	Swatantra Party
1967	Rajendra Narayan Singh Deo	Swatantra Party
1961	Chandra Sekhar Singh Bhoi	Swatantra Party
1957 (Note: It was a 2 member constituency)	Nandakishore Mishra	Ganatantra Parishad
1957	Ramesh Chandra Singh Bhoi	Ganatantra Parishad
1951 (Note: It was a 2 member constituency)	Nandakishore Mishra	Ganatantra Parishad
1951	Achyutananda Mahananda	Ganatantra Parishad

== Election results ==
=== 2024 ===
Voting was held on 20 May 2024 in the 2nd phase of Odisha Assembly Election & the 5th phase of Indian General Election. Counting of votes was on 4 June 2024. In 2024 election, Biju Janata Dal candidate Kalikesh Narayan Singh Deo defeated Indian National Congress candidate Samarendra Mishra by a margin of 13,409 votes.

2024 Odisha Vidhan Sabha Election, Bolangir
Party	Candidate	Votes	%	±%
BJD	Kalikesh Narayan Singh Deo	85,265	45.69	
INC	Samarendra Mishra	71,856	38.51	
BJP	Gopalji Panigrahi	24,932	13.36	
NOTA	None of the above	1,556	0.83	
Majority		13,409	7.18	
Turnout		1,86,609	76.68	
BJD gain from INC				

=== 2019 ===
In 2019 election, Indian National Congress candidate Narasingha Mishra defeated Biju Janata Dal candidate Arkesh Narayan Singh Deo by a margin of 5,341 votes.

2019 Odisha Legislative Assembly election: Bolangir
Party	Candidate	Votes	%	±%
INC	Narasingha Mishra	71,598	41.32	▲1.49
BJD	Arkesh Narayan Singh Deo	66,257	38.24	▲6.31
BJP	Ananta Kumar Dash	28,924	16.69	▼5.98
NOTA	None of the above	1,377	0.79	
Majority		5,341	3.08	
Turnout		1,73,288	72.98	
INC hold				

=== 2014 ===
In 2014 election, Indian National Congress candidate Narasingha Mishra defeated Biju Janata Dal candidate Ananga Udaya Singh Deo by a margin of 12,254 votes.

2014 Vidhan Sabha Election, Bolangir
Party	Candidate	Votes	%	±%
INC	Narasingha Mishra	61,730	39.83	▲12.09
BJD	Ananga Udaya Singh Deo	49,476	31.93	▼8.77
BJP	Basudev Pati	35,130	22.67	▼2.90
NOTA	None of the above	2,161	1.39	
Majority		12,254	7.91	
Turnout		1,54,975	73.54	
Registered electors		2,10,736		
INC gain from BJD				

=== 2009 ===
In 2009 election, Biju Janata Dal candidate Ananga Udaya Singh Deo defeated Indian National Congress candidate Laxman Kumar Meher by a margin of 16,866 votes.

2009 Vidhan Sabha Election, Bolangir
Party	Candidate	Votes	%	±%
BJD	Ananga Udaya Singh Deo	52,948	40.70	
INC	Laxman Kumar Meher	36,082	27.74	−
BJP	Dr. Basudev Pati	33,258	25.57	−
Majority		16,866	12.97 (Note: %of total valid votes)	−
Turnout		1,30,281	64.57	−
BJD hold				
