= Mukesh Mahaling =

Indian politician

Dr. Mukesh Mahaling
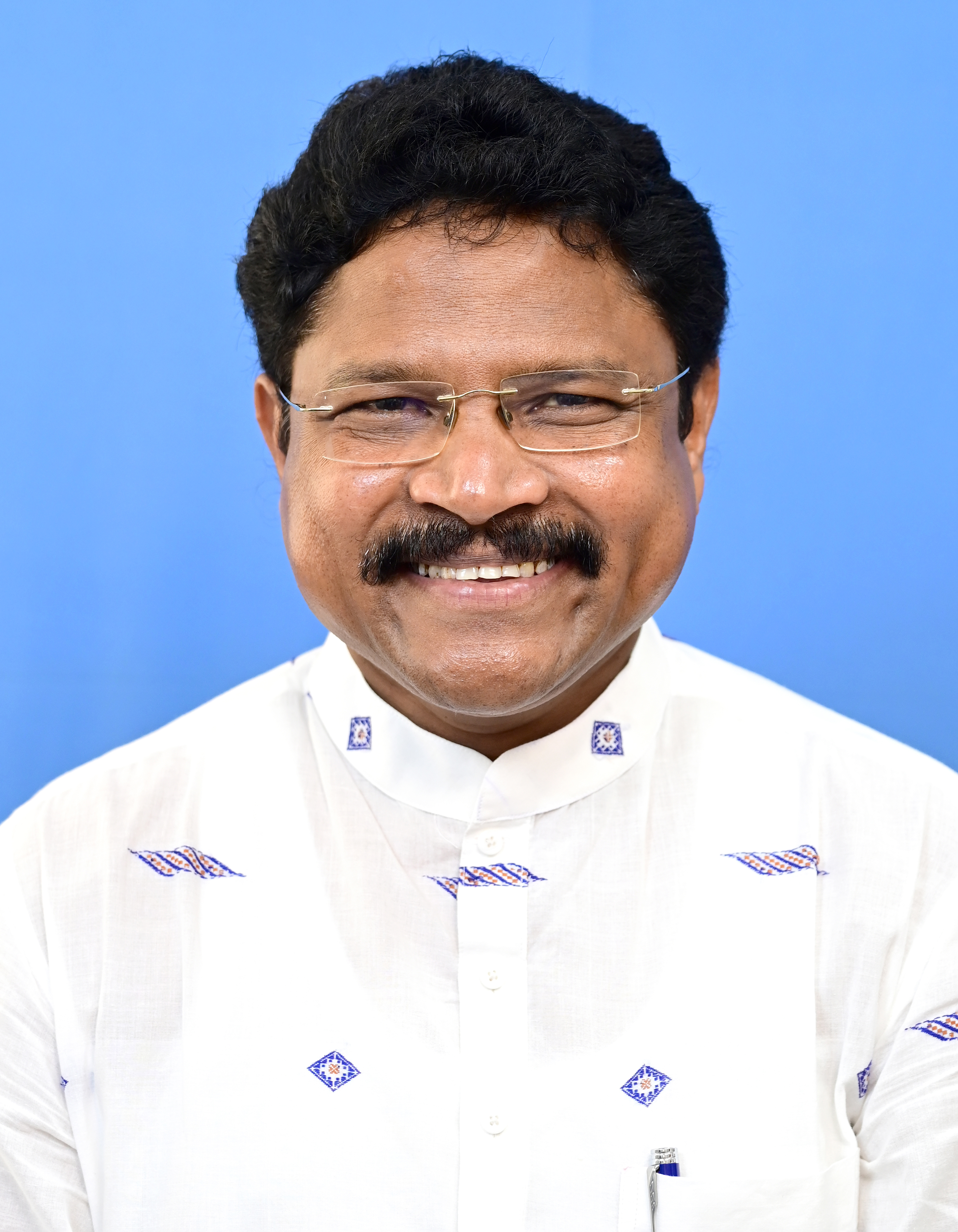

Minister of Health and Family Welfare Government of Odisha
- Incumbent
- Assumed office 12 June 2024
- Chief Minister: Mohan Charan Majhi
- Preceded by: Niranjan Pujari

Minister of Parliamentary Affairs Government of Odisha
- Incumbent
- Assumed office 12 June 2024
- Chief Minister: Mohan Charan Majhi
- Preceded by: Niranjan Pujari

Minister of Electronics & Information Technology Government of Odisha
- Incumbent
- Assumed office 12 June 2024
- Chief Minister: Mohan Charan Majhi
- Preceded by: Tusharkanti Behera

Member of Odisha Legislative Assembly
- Incumbent
- Assumed office 2019
- Preceded by: Jogendra Behera
- Constituency: Loisingha (SC)

Personal details
- Born: 11 July 1973 (age 53)
- Party: Bharatiya Janata Party
- Education: Master of Science; Master of Philosophy; Doctor of Philosophy (Zoology)
- Profession: Politician, social service

Dr. Mukesh Mahaling (born 11 July 1973) is an Indian politician. He currently serves as cabinet minister in government of Odisha, and is a senior member of the Bharatiya Janata Party (BJP). He represents the Loisingha constituency in Odisha Legislative Assembly since 2019. Mahaling took his oath of office in 2024 at Janata Maidan, Bhubaneswar.

== Electoral statistics ==
Year	Constituency	Votes	%	Result	Ref
2019	Loisingha	71,261	39.82	Won	
2024	Loisingha	83,313	44.32	Won	
