= Sangeeta Kumari Singh Deo =

Indian politician

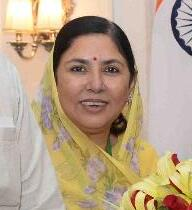
- Sangeeta in 2019

Member of Parliament, Lok Sabha
- Incumbent
- Assumed office 23 May 2019
- Preceded by: Kalikesh Narayan Singh Deo
- Constituency: Bolangir
- In office 3 March 1998 – 16 May 2009
- Preceded by: Sarat Pattanayak
- Succeeded by: Kalikesh Narayan Singh Deo
- Constituency: Bolangir

Personal details
- Born: Sangeeta Singh; 3 December 1961 (age 64) New Delhi, India
- Party: BJP
- Spouse: Kanak Vardhan Singh Deo
- Children: Nivritti Lakshyaraj Mewar
- Relatives: Lakshyaraj Singh Mewar (son-in-law)
- As of 22 September, 2006

Sangeeta Kumari Singh Deo (born 3 December 1961) is an Indian politician and the wife of the titular Maharaja of Bolangir, an erstwhile princely state located in Odisha. She is the current Member of Parliament in the Lok Sabha from Bolangir of Odisha representing the BJP. She is a member of the National executive of the party.

== Background and family ==
Sangeeta was born into the minor Rajput nobility of Rajasthan. Her natal family held an estate of five villages of which the largest was Kerote (or Kirot). Her father, Amar Singh, was a younger son and therefore he inherited little, but he entered government service, serving as an officer in the IPS. He retired as PR in-charge at the AIIMS, New Delhi. Sangeeta grew up in a middle class milieu and graduated from Delhi University with a BA in political science.

In October 1985, in a match arranged by their parents in the usual Indian way, Sangeeta was married to Kanakvardhan Singh Deo, son and heir of the former Maharaja of Patnagarh-Bolangir, an erstwhile princely state located in Odisha. The couple settled in Delhi and became the parents of a single child, a daughter named Nivritti. In January 2014, again in a match arranged by their families in the usual Indian way, Nivritti was married to Lakshyaraj Singh, the only son of businessman Arvind Singh Mewar.

== Career ==
Kanakvardhan's father and grandfather had both been active and successful politicians. His grandfather, Maharaja Rajendra Narayan Singh Deo, who had enjoyed absolute ruling power within his state during the period 1933–47, had adjusted very well to democracy after independence, and excelled in politics to the extent of serving as Chief Minister of Orissa during the period 1967-71 as a member of the Swatantra party. Kanakvardhan's father has also been a member of parliament twice. Inevitably, Kanakvardhan was drawn to politics and served for four terms as member for Patnagarh in the Odisha state assembly. The family felt the need to ensure that the national parliamentary seat covering their former kingdom should also be under their control. Kanakvardhan therefore made Sangeeta a member of his party, the Bharatiya Janata Party, and arranged for her to contest parliamentary elections. Sangeeta won the Bolangir Lok Sabha seat in 1998, 1999 and 2004 and thus was a member of the 12th, 13th and 14th Lok Sabhas. She lost the polls in 2009 and again in 2014 to a member of her own family, her husband's first cousin, Kalikesh Singh Deo, who is a prominent member of the Biju Janata Dal. Sangeeta took third position in the 2009 elections and second place in 2014.
