= Kalikesh Narayan Singh Deo =

Indian politician

- କଳିକେଶ ନାରାୟଣ ସିଂହଦେଓ

President of the National Rifle Association of India
- Incumbent
- Assumed office 21 September 2024
- Preceded by: Raninder Singh

Member of the Odisha Legislative Assembly
- Incumbent
- Assumed office 12 June 2024
- Preceded by: Narasingha Mishra
- Constituency: Bolangir
- In office 2004–2009
- Preceded by: Surendra Singh Bhoi
- Succeeded by: Constituency Abolished
- Constituency: Saintala

Member of Parliament, Lok Sabha
- In office 16 May 2009 – 23 May 2019
- Preceded by: Sangeeta Singh Deo
- Succeeded by: Sangeeta Singh Deo
- Constituency: Bolangir

Personal details
- Born: Kalikesh Narayan Singh Deo; 26 May 1974 (age 52)
- Party: Biju Janata Dal
- Spouse: Meghna R. L. Rana
- Relations: Arkesh Singh Deo (Brother); Ananga Udaya Singh Deo (Father); Rajendra Narayan Singh Deo (Grandfather); Gaurav Shumsher JB Rana (Father In Law); Kanak Vardhan Singh Deo (Paternal cousin)
- Education: The Doon School, Dehradun; St. Stephen's College, Delhi (BA)
- Profession: Politician, sports administrator
- Committees: Standing Committee on Petroleum and Natural Gas, Consultative Committee (Ministry of Finance and Corporate Affairs)
- Website: https://www.kalikesh.com

Kalikesh Narayan Singh Deo, also written as Kalikesh Singh Deo, is an Indian politician and sports administrator. He is Member of the Odisha Legislative Assembly.

== Early life and background ==
Kalikesh Narayan Singh Deo is the son of Ananga Udaya Singh Deo and the grandson of Rajendra Narayan Singh Deo, both politicians, with his grandfather having served as Chief Minister of Odisha. His, grandmother, Kailash Kumari Devi, was the daughter of Maharaja Bhupinder Singh of Patiala. His brother, Arkesh, is also a politician.

He attended the Doon School, Dehradun and graduated in economics from St. Stephen's College, Delhi University. He represented India in shooting and basketball.

== Political career ==
Deo was a Member of Parliament (MP) in the Lok Sabha from Bolangir, and a member and a leader of the Biju Janata Dal political party. Prior to becoming an MP, Deo was the youngest member of the Odisha Legislative Assembly, to which he was elected to in 2004 as a representative of the Saintala constituency. In the 2024 Odisha Legislative Assembly election in June, Deo was elected from the Bolangir Assembly constituency.

== Sports administration ==
In September 2024, Deo was elected as the President of the National Rifle Association of India (NRAI). As President of the NRAI, Deo, in 2024, announced the formation of the Shooting League of India, a franchise based league for shooting, which is scheduled to be launched in 2025.

== Personal life ==
Deo is married to Meghna Rana, a member of the former Rana dynasty of Nepal and the daughter of Gaurav Shumsher JB Rana, who served as the Chief of the Army Staff of the Nepalese Army.
