= Patna State =

Princely state of India

Coordinates: 20.72°N 83.48°E

- Princely State of British India
- 1360–1948
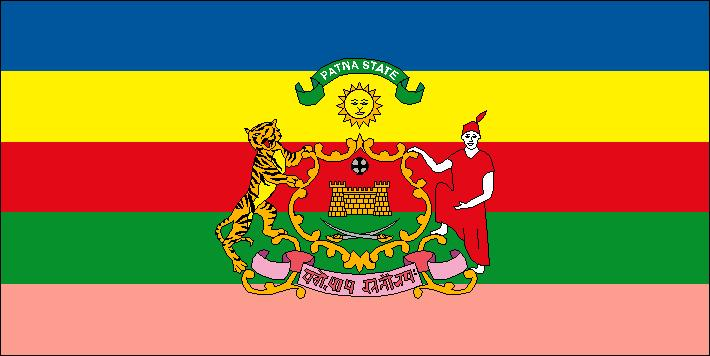
- Flag

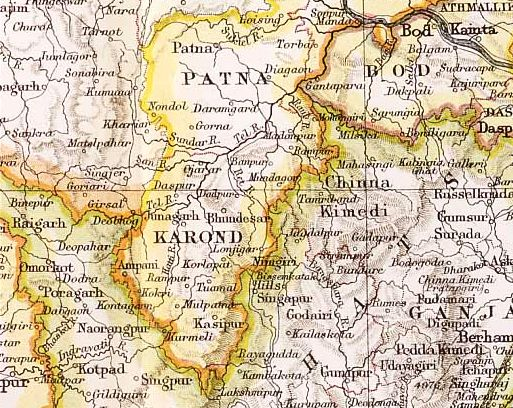
- Patna and Karond (Kalahandi) State in the Imperial Gazetteer of India
- Area
  - 1892: 6,503 km^{2} (2,511 sq mi)
- Population
  - 1892: 257,959
- Government
  - Type: Monarchy
- Raja
  - 1360–1380: Ramai Deva (first)
  - 1924–1948: Rajendra Narayan Singh Deo (last)
- History
  - Established: 1360
  - Accession to the Indian Union: 1948
| Succeeded by |
| India |
- Indian Princely States K-W

Patna State was a princely state in the Eastern States Agency of India during the British Raj. It had its capital at Balangir. Its area was 6,503 km^{2} (2,511 mi^{2}). It is now part of the Indian state of Odisha.

== History ==
The foundation of the Patna kingdom was laid by Ramai Deva of the Chauhan dynasty in 1360 CE when he overthrew Hattahamir Deb, the administrator of the region as the Eastern Ganga Empire started weakening following invasions from the northern part of the subcontinent. The Chauhan reign eventually extended over the region under its cadet branches which included the kingdoms of Sambalpur State, Sonepur State and the zamindaries of Khariar and Jarasingha. The history of the Chauhan rule in the region is also obtained from the 17th century palm-leaf manuscript Kosalananda Kavya.

After Indian independence, Patna's last ruler, Rajendra Narayan Singh Deo, acceded to the newly independent Dominion of India, on 1 January 1948 with the state forming much of the present day Balangir district. Rajendra Narayan Singh Deo, built a new career as an elected politician and served as Chief Minister of Orissa from 8 March 1967 to 9 January 1971.

== Rulers ==
The rulers of Patna state of the Chauhan Dynasty:

- Ramai Deva (1360–1380)
- Mahalinga Deva (1380–1385)
- Vatsaraja Deva (1385–1410)
- Vaijala Deva I (1410–1430)
- Bhojaraj Deva (1430–1455)
- Pratap Rudra Deva I (1455–1480)
- Bhupal Deva I (1480–1500)
- Vikramaditya Deva I (1500–1520)
- Vaijal Deva II (1520–1540)
- Bajra Hiradhara Deva (1540–1570)
- Narsingh Deva (1570–1577)
- Hamir Deva (1577–1581)
- Pratap Deva II (1581–1620)
- Vikramaditya Deva II (1620–1640)
- Mukunda Deva (1640–1670)
- Balaram Deva (1670–1678)
- Hrdesha Deva (1678–1685)
- Rai Singh Deva (1685–1762)
- Prithviraj Deva (1762–1765)
- Ramchandra Singh Deo I (1765–1820)
- Bhupal Singh Deo (1820–1848)
- Hiravajra Singh Deo (1848–1866)
- Pratap Singh Deo (1866–25 November 1878)
- Ramchandra Singh Deo II (25 November 1878-1895)
- Lal Dalganjan Singh Deo (1895–1910)
- Prithviraj Singh (1910–1924)
- Rajendra Narayan Singh Deo (1924–1 January 1948)

=== Titular ===
- Rajendra Narayan Singh Deo (1 January 1948 – 23 February 1975)
- Rajraj Singh Deo (23 February 1975 – April 2004)
- Kanak Vardhan Singh Deo (April 2004 – present)

== Gallery ==
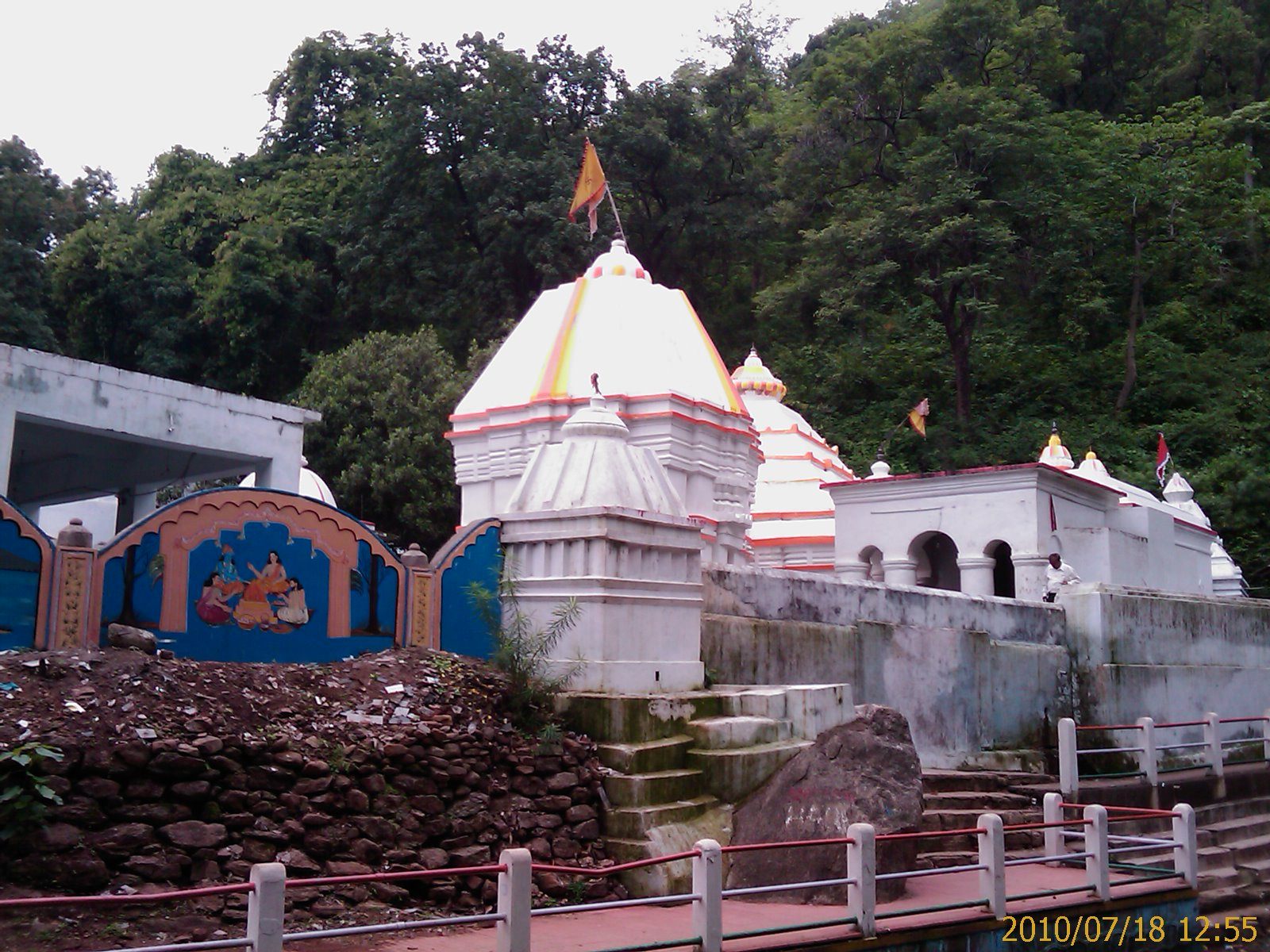
Harishankar Temple

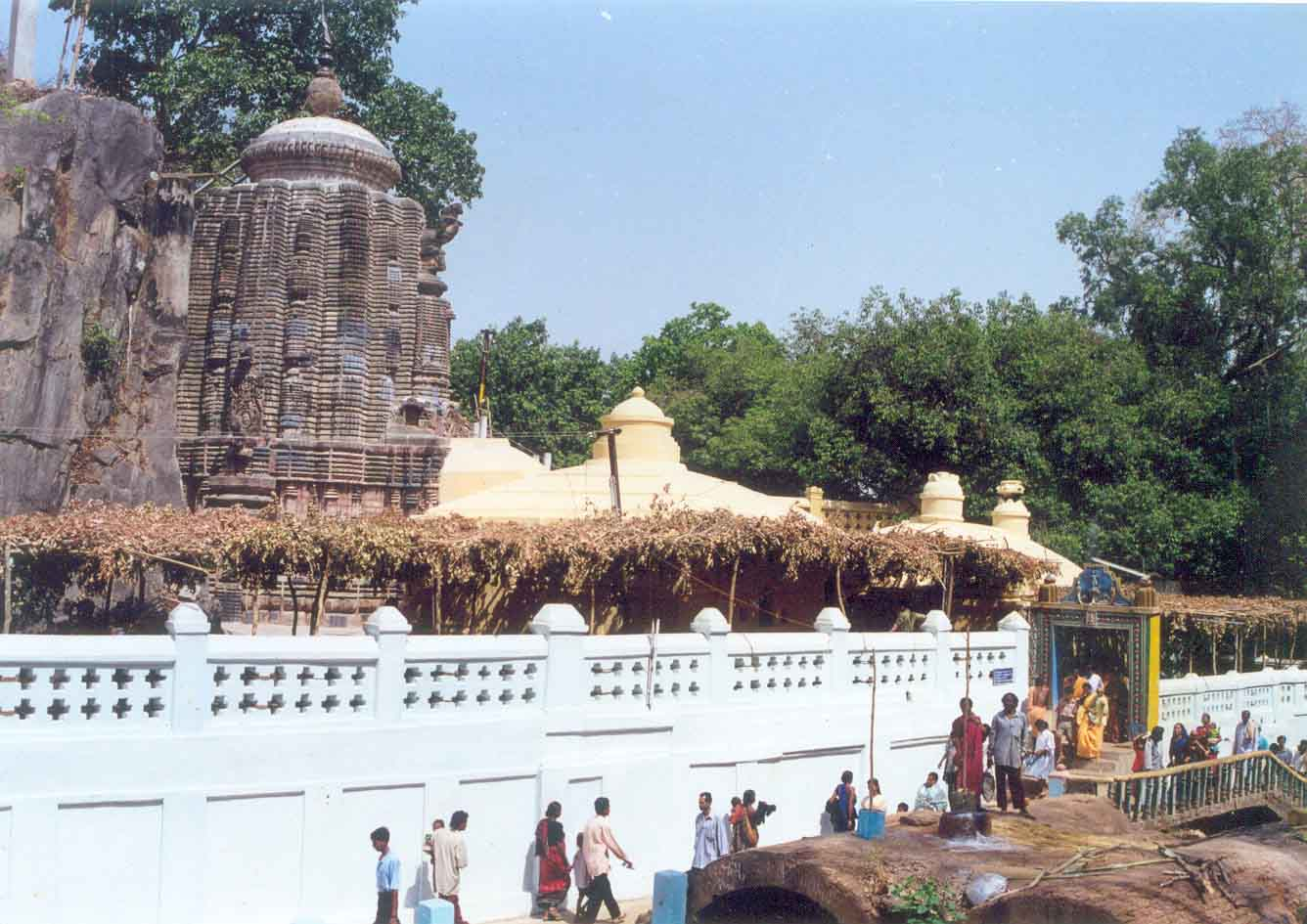
Nrusinghanath Temple

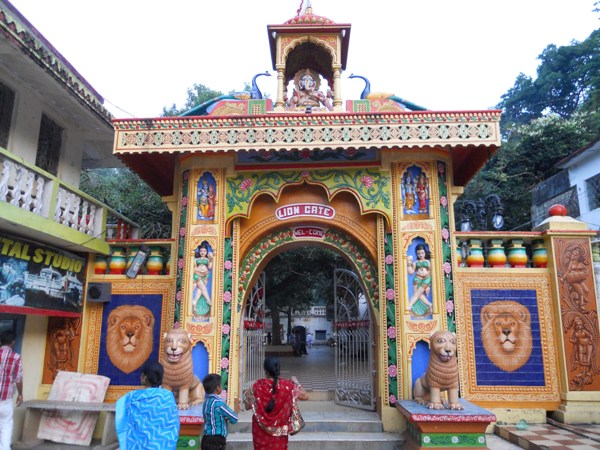
Nrusinghanath Temple entrance

== See also ==
- Eastern States Agency
- Political integration of India
