= Rajendra Narayan Singh Deo =

Indian politician (1912–1975)

Maharaja Rajendra Narayan Singh Deo KCIE
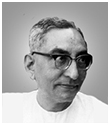

6th Chief Minister of Odisha
- In office 8 March 1967 – 9 January 1971
- Preceded by: Sadashiva Tripathy
- Succeeded by: Bishwanath Das

Personal details
- Born: 31 March 1912 Balangir, Patna State, British India
- Died: 23 February 1975 (aged 62)
- Party: Swatantra Party
- Other political affiliations: Ganatantra Parishad
- Spouse: Kailash Kumari Devi
- Children: 6 (4 daughters and 2 sons, including Raj and Ananga)
- Relatives: Kanak Vardhan Singh Deo (grandson); Kalikesh Narayan Singh Deo (grandson); Arkesh Singh Deo (grandson); Maharaja Bhupinder Singh (father-in-law); Chandrachur Singh (grandson); Ratnaprava Devi (sister); Kamakhya Prasad Singh Deo (nephew); Abhimanyu Singh (grandson)
- Education: Mayo College, St. Columba's College, Hazaribagh
- Profession: Politician

Rajendra Narayan Singh Deo KCIE (31 March 1912 – 23 February 1975) was an Indian politician and the last ruler of the princely state of Patna in Odisha before Indian independence in 1947. He was the president of the Ganatantra Parishad political party from 1950 to 1962 and the president of the Odisha state unit of the Swatantra Party after the merger of the Ganatantra Parishad with it in 1962. Deo was elected multiple times to the Odisha Legislative Assembly. He served as the chief minister of Odisha from 1967 to 1971. Early in his political career, Deo served as a member of Parliament in the 1st Lok Sabha.

== Early life and education ==
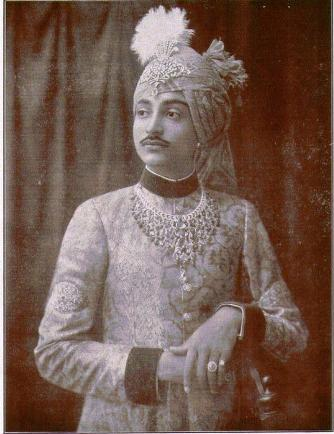
Deo in his youth

Deo was born in a royal Rajput family to Raja Aditya Pratap Singh, the ruler of the small princely state of Seraikela and Rani Padmini Kumari Devi. He was adopted by Maharaja Prithwiraj Singh Deo of Patna state, which had been ruled by Chauhan Rajputs. He studied in the Mayo College in Ajmer and the St. Columbia's College in Hazaribagh.

Deo became the maharaja of Patna state in 1924 and assumed full powers in 1933. He was appointed a Knight Commander of the Order of the Indian Empire (KCIE) in the 1946 New Year Honours list. In 1948, Patna was merged with the Union of India.

== Political career ==
In 1951, Deo was elected to the 1st Lok Sabha from Kalahandi Bolangir constituency in Odisha as a Ganatantra Parishad candidate.

In 1957, he was elected to the Odisha Legislative Assembly from Titilagarh constituency and also became the leader of the opposition in the Odisha Legislative Assembly. Deo was the minister of finance in this government. The coalition government collapsed on 21 February 1961 and the president's rule was imposed in the state. In 1961, he was re-elected to the Odisha Legislative Assembly from Kantabanji constituency. Then he merged his party Ganatantra Parishad with Swatantra Party. He became the head of the Odisha state unit of the Swatantra Party.

In 1967, he was re-elected to the Odisha Legislative Assembly from Bolangir constituency. He led a coalition government formed by the Swatantra Party and the Odisha Jana Congress of Harekrushna Mahatab. He became the Chief Minister of Odisha in March 1967. Deo was the first Chief Minister of Odisha who was not from the Indian National Congress. He resigned from the office on 9 January 1971 and president's rule was imposed. In 1971 and 1974, he was re-elected to the Odisha Legislative Assembly from the same constituency.

== Personal life and family ==
In 1932, aged 20, Deo married Kailash Kumari Devi, the daughter of Maharaja Bhupinder Singh of Patiala. Through his wife, Deo's brother-in-law was Vipin Khanna. Deo and Kailash Kumari Devi had two children, Raj Raj Singh and Ananga Udaya Singh. Deo's children and his descendants have been active in Odisha politics.

He died on 23 February 1975.

His grandson, Kanak Vardhan Singh Deo, is a politician from the Bharatiya Janata Party and is serving as the deputy chief minister of Odisha. He is also the maternal grandfather to Bollywood actor Chandrachur Singh, who is the son of his youngest daughter Krishna Kumari Devi.

== Notes ==
Preceded by Sadashiva Tripathy	Chief Minister of Odisha; 8 March 1967 – 9 January 1971	Succeeded by Bishwanath Das
