= Balgopal Mishra =

Indian politician

Balgopal Mishra (born 5 November 1941 in Salebhata, Bolangir district, Orissa) is an Indian politician and was member of the Bharatiya Janata Party. He is a member of the Odisha Legislative Assembly from the Loisingha constituency in Bolangir district as well as was member of 9th Lok Sabha from Bolangir constituency as Janata Dal candidate.
