= Balangir =

City in Odisha, India

- Town
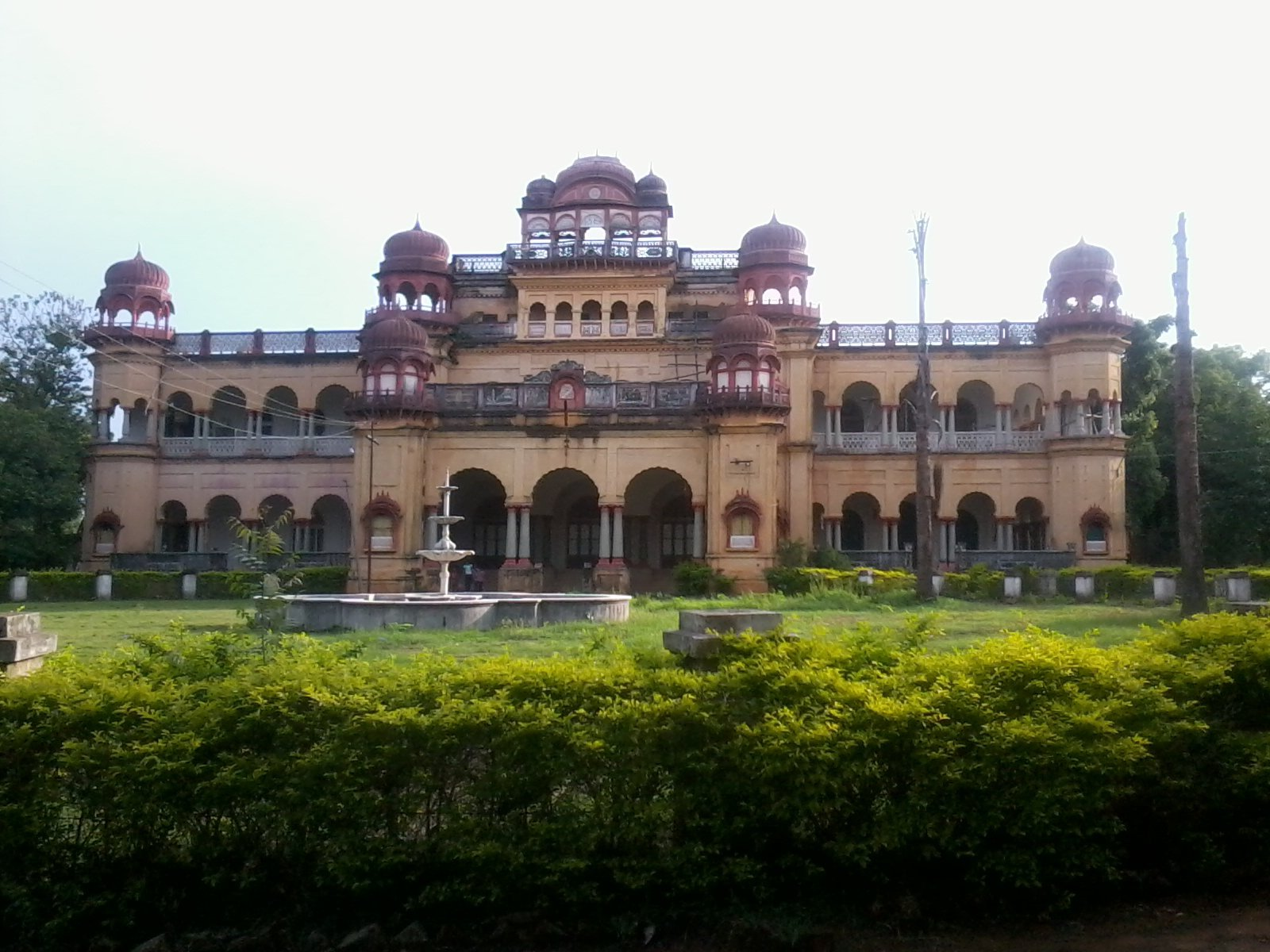
- Balangir Royal Palace

- Location in Odisha, India Balangir (India) Balangir (Asia) Balangir (Earth)
- Coordinates: 20.72°N 83.48°E
- Country: India
- State: Odisha
- District: Balangir

Government
  - Type: Municipality
  - Body: Balangir Municipality
  - Collector & District Magistrate: Gaurav Shivaji Isalwar (Indian Administrative Service)
  - Member of Parliament: Sangeeta Kumari Singh Deo (BJP)
  - Member of Legislative Assembly: Kalikesh Narayan Singh Deo (BJD)
  - Superintendent of Police: Abhilash G. (IPS)
  - Municipality Chairman/ Chairman of The Municipal Council: Smt. Lika Sahu (BJD)
- Elevation: 384 m (1,260 ft)

Population (2011)
  - Total: 1,648,997
  - Rank: 305
- Demonym: Balangiria

Languages
  - Official: Odia, English
  - Local: Kosli-Sambalpuri
- Time zone: UTC+5:30 (IST)
- PIN: 767001 (Balangir), 767002 (Rajendra College)
- Telephone code: 06652
- Vehicle registration: OD 03 /OR 03
- Website: balangir.nic.in

Balangir also known as Bolangir, is a town and a municipality, the headquarters of Balangir district in the state of Odisha, India. Balangir's cultural heritage makes it one of the finest places for tourists in Odisha. Balangir municipality is divided into 21 wards. It is spread over an area of 12,200 acres (4,900 ha).

== Geography ==
Balangir is located at 20.72°N 83.48°E. It has an average elevation of 383 metres (800 feet) above sea level.

== People from Balangir ==
- Rajendra Narayan Singh Deo, former Chief Minister of Orissa
- Srinibash Udgata, eminent poet awarded Padma Shri by Government of India
- Narasingha Mishra, Ex-Law Minister of Odisha, Chairman, WODC, leader of the opposition in Orissa Legislative Assembly (2014–19), senior Congress politician, eminent lawyer in 12th Law Commission of Government of India.
- Rasanara Parwin is a cricket player of the India women's national cricket team.
- Harinarayan Pujari, is a member of the BCCI and also the President of the District Journalist Association, Balangir . Also he is the secretary of Gandhi Stadium, Bolangir. He is also a social worker.

== Transport ==
=== Airport ===
The Jharsuguda Airport at Jharsuguda is the nearest airport to the city while Swami Vivekananda Airport at Raipur, Chhattisgarh is 234 km away. Biju Patnaik International Airport in the state capital, Bhubaneswar is 327 km away by road and 397 km by rail.

=== Railway station ===
Balangir Junction railway station on the Jharsuguda-Sambalpur-Titlagarh railway line of East Coast Railways is the city's railway link to the national railway network.

=== Highway ===
Bolangir is connected by road to the state capital Bhubaneswar which is 327 km to the east.

== Politics ==
Current MLA from Bolangir Assembly Constituency is Kalikesh Narayan Singh Deo of Biju Janata Dal, who won the seat in State elections of 2024.

Bolangir is part of Bolangir (Lok Sabha constituency).

== Culture ==
=== The Nuakhai ===
The "Nuakhai" is a social festival of unity. This festival is observed among kith and kins during the month of Bhadraba. The appropriate date of the Nuakhai is just the day after the Ganesh Puja. It is a festival of harvest of crops. On this occasion, the new grain after harvesting is first offered to the local deity and during this festival, the people get themselves lost in merrymakings. Wearing new clothes, preparing delicious foods the people of this area celebrate this festival with enthusiasm. It is mostly an agricultural festival of Western Odisha. It can also be dubbed as The 'Baisakhi' of Odisha.

=== Ratha Jatra, The Chariot Festival ===
In the Ratha Yatra, the three deities are taken from the Jagannath Temple in the chariots to the 'Mausi Mandira' or Gundicha Temple, where they stay for nine days. Thereafter, the deities again ride the chariots back to Shri Mandir in bahuda jatra. On the way back, the three chariots halt at the Mausi Maa Temple and the deities are offered Poda Pitha, a kind of baked cake which are generally consumed by the people of Odisha.

Ratha Yatra is a journey in a chariot accompanied by the public. It typically refers to a procession (journey) of deities, people dressed like deities, or simply religious saints and political leaders.

== Religion ==
=== Hinduism ===
Balangir is a predominantly Hindu-dominated city, with approximately 98% of its population being Hindu. Which makes Balangir one of the highest Hindu populated cities in India.

== Tourist attractions ==
=== Gandhamardan Hills ===
Gandhamardan Hills or Gandhamardan Parbat (Odia: ଗନ୍ଧମାର୍ଦନ ପର୍ବତ) (3296 ft) is a hill located in between Balangir and Bargarh district of Odisha, India. This hill is well known for medicinal plants. Lord Hanuman is believed to reside here and in the Piduru Mountains in Sri Lanka.

The Botanical Survey of India has reported the existence of 220 plant species of medicinal value. Local people, however, claim that there are more than 500 species of medicinal plants in this area. The flora of the buffer zone is most vulnerable.

=== Harishankar Temple ===
Sri Sri Harisankar Devasthana is a temple on the slopes of Gandhamardhan hills, Bolangir District of Odisha in India. It is popular for its scenes of nature and connection to two Hindu lords, Vishnu and Shiva. As a holy place, along with a stream passing on the granite bed, it has given some visitors a feeling of peace. On the opposite of side of the Gandhamardhan hills is the temple of Nrusinghanath. The plateau between the two temples has been found to have ancient Buddhist ruins, which are considered to be remnants of the ancient Parimalgiri University.

The deity of Harisankar was discovered by a Chauhan dynasty king of Patna kingdom of Odisha, during the 14th century. From that time, the deity has been worshipped. A dancing Ganesha image has been found, which can be traced to the early 12th century. The temple was constructed by the order of then queen Durlabha Devi of Maharaja Vaijjal Dev Chauhan.

It is located in the district of Balangir, Odisha. The nearest railway station is at Harishankar Road, only 32 km from the temple. Regular taxis are available to the temple from this railway station. The town of Balangir and Balangir Railway Station is around 80 km from Harishankar, which is well connected by roadways.

=== Ranipur Jharial ===
It is a historical destination, near Kantabanji. An ancient, roundabout like temple preserves the history of Ranipur-Jharial with its rocky terrain. It also has a pond.

== Climate ==
Climate data for Balangir (1991–2020, extremes 1957–2020)
Month	Jan	Feb	Mar	Apr	May	Jun	Jul	Aug	Sep	Oct	Nov	Dec	Year
Record high °C (°F)	39.7 (103.5)	39.3 (102.7)	45.1 (113.2)	49.0 (120.2)	48.3 (118.9)	47.7 (117.9)	40.7 (105.3)	39.0 (102.2)	38.4 (101.1)	38.8 (101.8)	36.6 (97.9)	33.2 (91.8)	49.0 (120.2)
Mean daily maximum °C (°F)	28.2 (82.8)	32.3 (90.1)	37.1 (98.8)	40.8 (105.4)	41.7 (107.1)	37.1 (98.8)	31.5 (88.7)	30.9 (87.6)	31.9 (89.4)	31.9 (89.4)	29.6 (85.3)	27.3 (81.1)	33.5 (92.3)
Mean daily minimum °C (°F)	10.8 (51.4)	13.9 (57.0)	18.0 (64.4)	22.5 (72.5)	23.1 (73.6)	21.7 (71.1)	20.9 (69.6)	20.9 (69.6)	21.4 (70.5)	19.8 (67.6)	15.2 (59.4)	11.0 (51.8)	18.3 (64.9)
Record low °C (°F)	1.2 (34.2)	3.5 (38.3)	7.9 (46.2)	9.3 (48.7)	10.0 (50.0)	11.0 (51.8)	10.0 (50.0)	12.6 (54.7)	13.9 (57.0)	10.6 (51.1)	3.9 (39.0)	1.6 (34.9)	1.2 (34.2)
Average rainfall mm (inches)	3.7 (0.15)	16.9 (0.67)	8.3 (0.33)	27.6 (1.09)	51.4 (2.02)	176.3 (6.94)	419.2 (16.50)	446.5 (17.58)	241.2 (9.50)	56.3 (2.22)	6.7 (0.26)	2.7 (0.11)	1,457.1 (57.37)
Average rainy days	0.4	0.6	0.9	1.9	3.0	5.6	14.6	15.0	10.0	3.3	0.4	0.5	56.2
Average relative humidity (%) (at 17:30 IST)	53	46	40	38	40	59	78	81	77	69	62	59	59
Source: India Meteorological Department
