= Jharbandh =

- Town
- Nickname: JRB
- Location in Odisha, India Jharbandh (India)
- Coordinates: 21°3′39.8916″N 82°47′33.7596″E
- Country: India
- State: Odisha
- District: Bargarh

Government
  - Type: block
- Elevation: 265 m (869 ft)

Population (2011)
  - Total: 3,669

Languages
  - Official: Odia
  - Local: Sambalpuri
- Time zone: UTC+5:30 (IST)
- PIN: 768042
- Vehicle registration: OD17
- Website: odisha.gov.in

Jharbandh is a town in Bargarh district in the Indian state of Odisha. Jharbandh comes under the padmapur Vidhan Sabha in Odisha state and is under the Bargarh Lok Sabha constituency in India.

== Geography ==
Jharbandh is located at 21.03°N 82.47°E. It has an average elevation of 265 metres (869 ft). It is almost 132 kilometres (82 mi) from its district headquarters, Bargarh. It is about 502 kilometres (312 mi) from its capital city of Bhubaneshwar. Jharbandh is a block of Padampur subdivision, distance from Jharbandh to Padampur is about 56 kilometres (35 mi). The area around Jharbandh is rain-fed and hence is prone to frequent droughts. The Gandhamardhan hills is about 32 kilometres (20 mi) away and forms the borders between Bargarh and Balangir districts. To date, the beautiful locale has not been spoiled by industrialisation, but the per capita income is very low. Nrusinghanath Temple of Gandhamardhan hills is famous in all over the Odisha for lord Nrusingha.

== Demographics ==
As of 2001 India census, Jharbandh had a population of 2,200. Jharbandh has a literacy rate of about nearly 61%.

== Jharbandh Block ==
Jharbandh is the Panchayat Samiti headquarters consisting of 14 grampanchayats.

The grampanchayats are:

1. Bhandarpuri
2. Dava
3. Chhotanki
4. Kurlupali
5. Bhainsadarha
6. Amthi
7. Bilaspur
8. Chandibhata
1. Gothuguda
2. Jagdalpur
3. Kandadangar
4. Kumir
5. Laudidarha
6. Jharbandh

== Politics ==
Current MLA from Padmapur Assembly Constituency is barsa singh bariha of BJD who won the seat in by-elections in 2023. He was succeeded by Bijaya Ranjan Singh Bariha of BJD, who won the seat in State elections in 2009. He also won this seat earlier for BJD in 2000 and for JD in 1995 and in 1990. Other previous MLAs from this seat were Satya Narayan Sahu of INC who won this seat in 2004, in 1985 for INC and in 1980 representing INC(I).
