= Bhandarpuri =

- Village
- Location in Odisha, India Bhandarpuri (India)
- Coordinates: 21°7′43.0428″N 82°43′18.552″E
- Country: India
- State: Odisha
- District: Bargarh
- Elevation: 344 m (1,129 ft)

Population (2011)
  - Total: 1,362

Languages
  - Official: Odia(Sambalpuri)
- Time zone: UTC+5:30 (IST)
- PIN: 768042
- Vehicle registration: OD
- Website: www.bhandarpurigp.odishapr.gov.in/-/

Bhandarpuri is a village in Bargarh district in the Indian state of Odisha.

== Geography ==
Bhandarpuri is located at 21.07°N 82.43°E. It has an average elevation of 344 metres (1,129 ft). It is almost 145 kilometres (90 mi) from its district headquarters, Bargarh. It is about 502 kilometres (312 mi) from its capital city of Bhubaneswar.

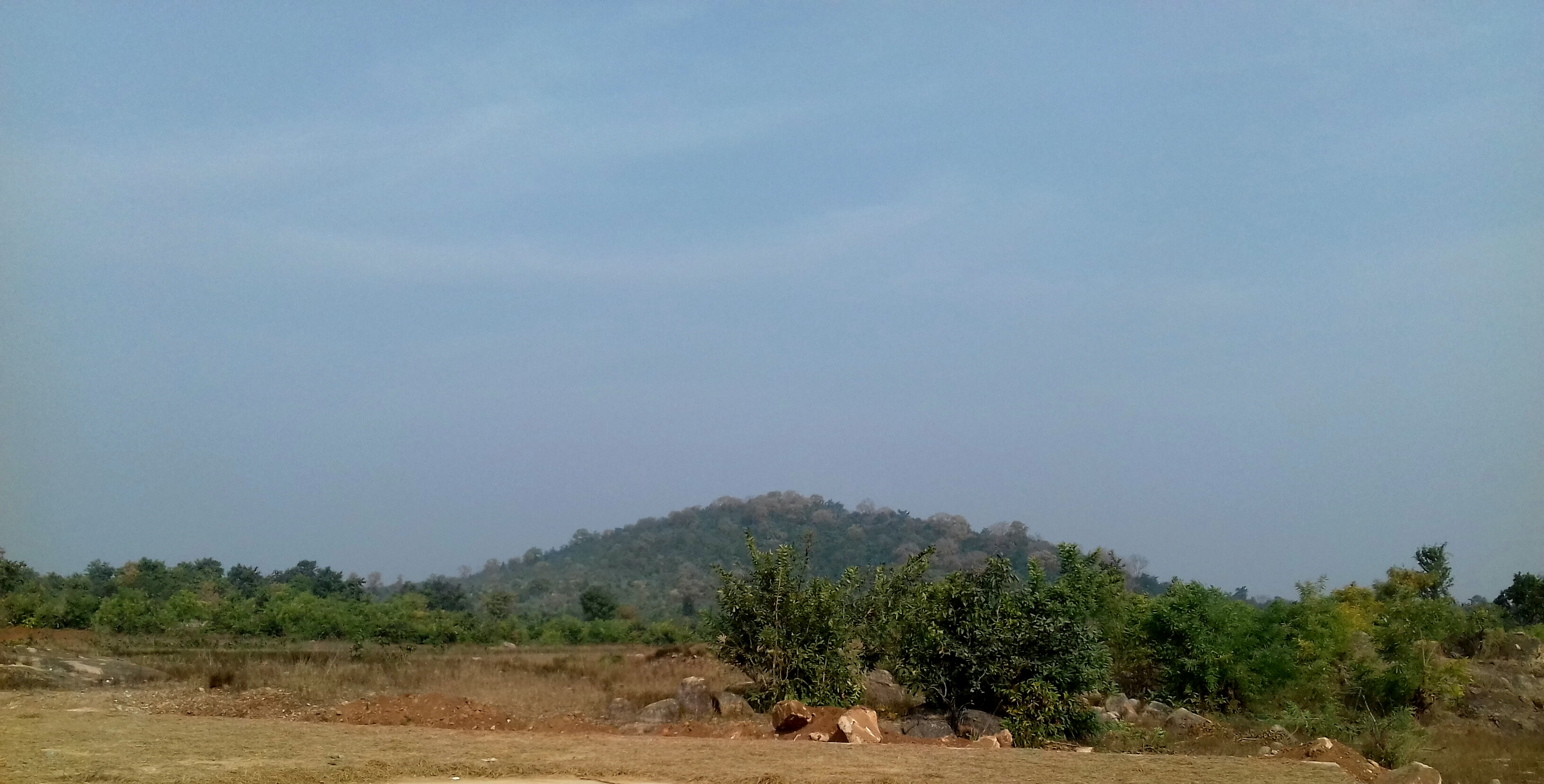

Bhandarpuri is a grampanchayat of Jharbandh block of Padampur subdivision, distance from Bhandarpuri to Padampur is about 65 km. This area is mostly hilly and the village is surrounded by many small to medium hills. The area around Bhandarpuri is rain-fed and hence is prone to frequent droughts.

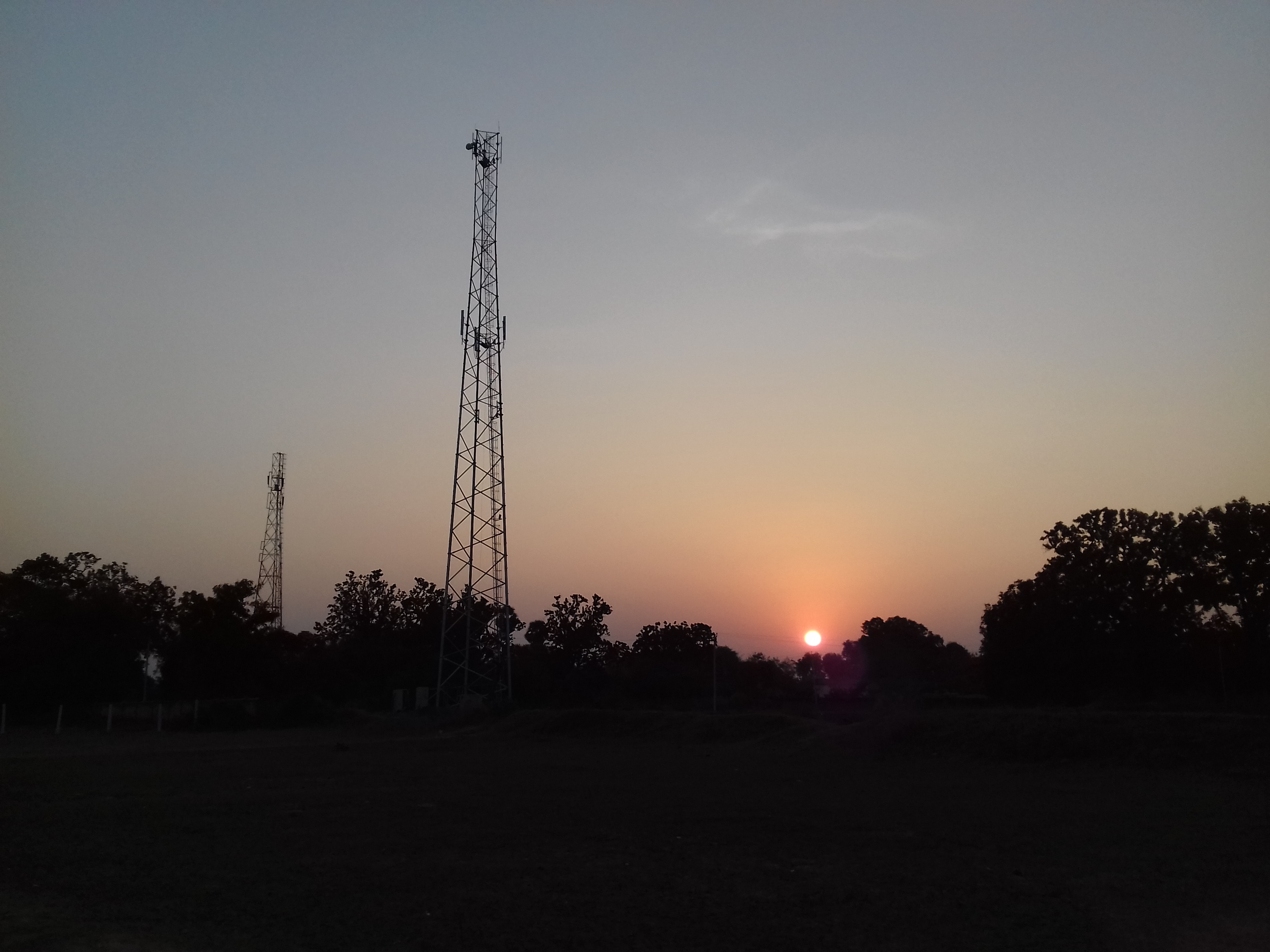
A Sunset at School Playground Bhandarpuri

The Gandhamardhan hills is about 32 kilometres (20 mi) away and forms the borders between Bargarh and Balangir districts. Till date the beautiful locale has not been spoiled by industrialisation, but the per capita income is very low. The Nrusinghanath Temple of Gandhamardhan hills is known in Odisha for Lord Nrusingha.

== Bhandarpuri gram panchayat ==
Bhandarpuri gram panchayat is made up of five villages, namely Bhandarpuri, Jampali, Kukripali, Sukmanipur and Keudadar.

== Demographics ==
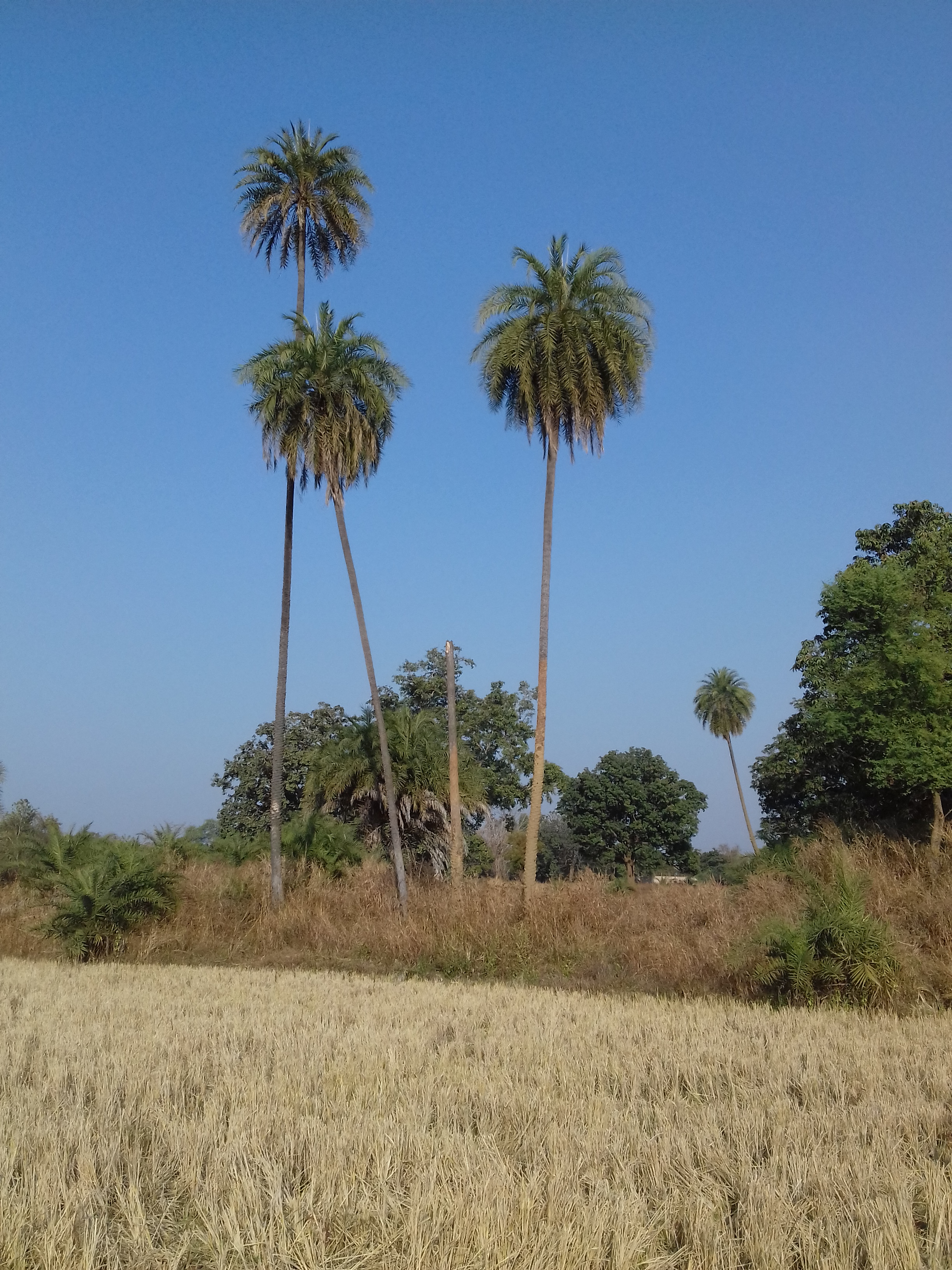
The beautiful Khajur Formation

As of 2011 India census, Bhandarpuri had a population of 1,362, out of which 665 are male and 697 are female.

== Education ==
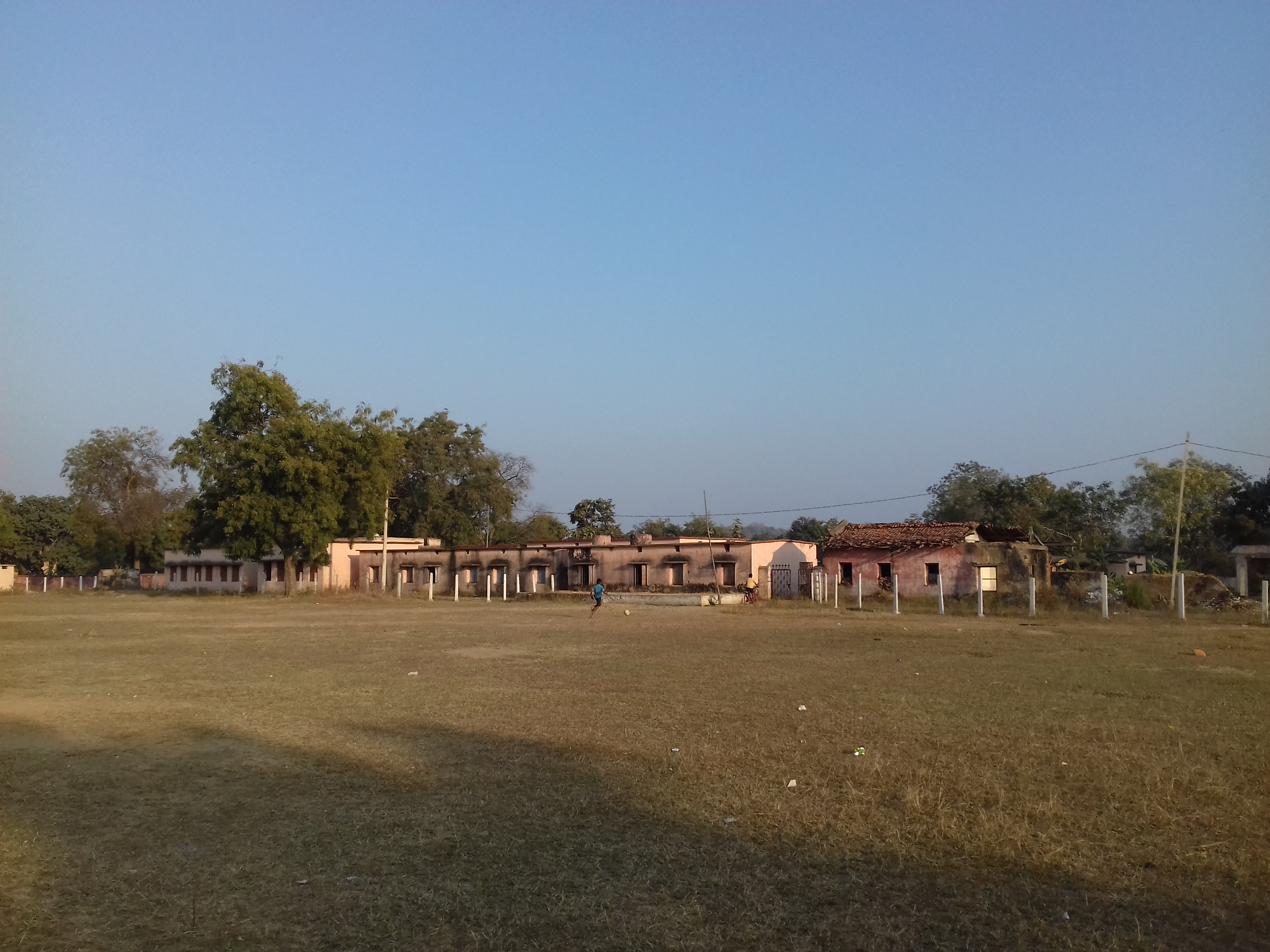
The playground behind Bhandarpuri UGHS School

Bhandarpuri has a high school named Upgraded Government High School Bhandarpuri, which houses from 1 to 10th standard. There are also three Anganwadis for children below the age of 1.

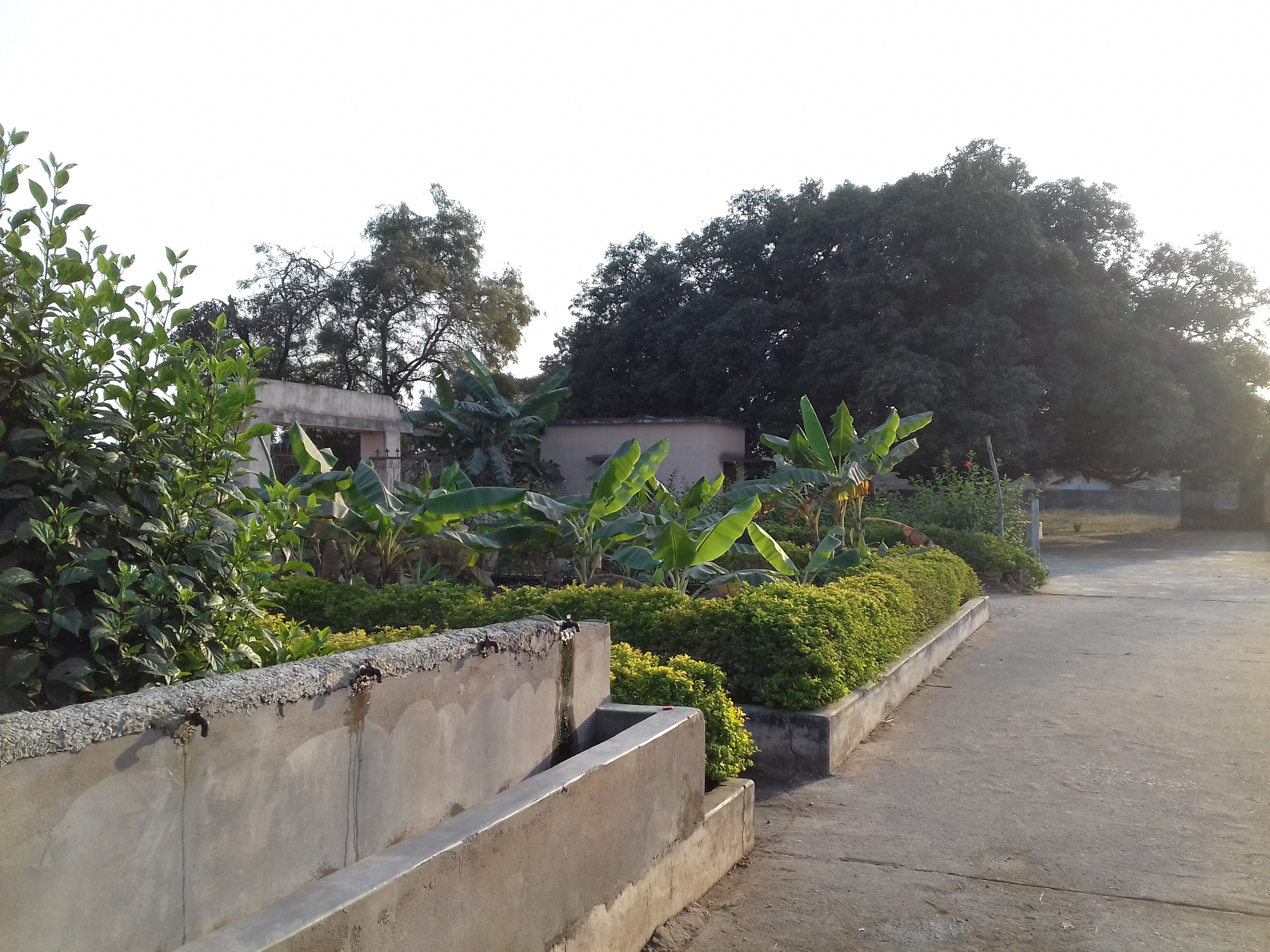
Inside the School

== Politics ==
Current MLA from Padmapur Assembly Constituency is Bijaya Ranjan Singh Bariha of BJD who won the seat in State elections in 2019. He also won this seat earlier for BJD in 2000 and for JD in 1995 and in 1990. He was succeeded by Pradip Purohit of BJP, who won the seat in state elections in 2014. Other previous MLAs from this seat were Satya Narayan Sahu of INC who won this seat in 2004, in 1985 for INC and in 1980 representing INC(I).
