= Temri =

- Village
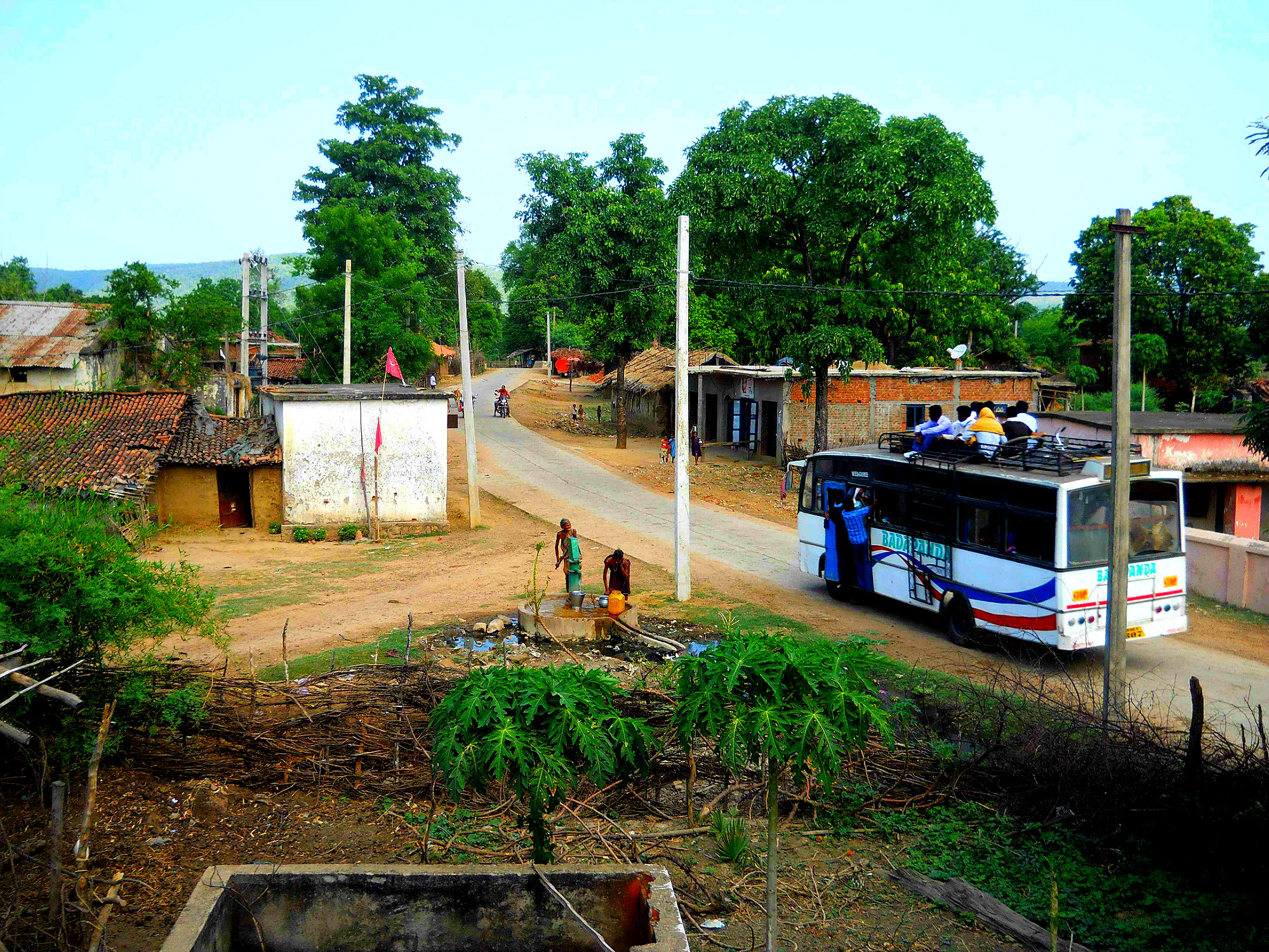
- Nickname: Temari
- Location in Odisha, India Temri (India)
- Coordinates: 21°0′42″N 82°53′45″E
- Country: India
- State: Odisha
- District: Bargarh
- Elevation: 205 m (673 ft)

Population (2001)
  - Total: 2,093

Languages
  - Official: Odia
- Time zone: UTC+5:30 (IST)
- PIN: 768039
- Vehicle registration: OD 17
- Website: odisha.gov.in

Temri (also known as Temari) is a village Gram panchayat of Paikmal block and Padampur subdivision in Bargarh district in the Indian state of Odisha.

== Education ==
The village has a primary government school up to 7th standard name as Temri Nodal School and a High School from 8th to 10th standard. Temri High School had 174 students as of 2014.

== Geography ==
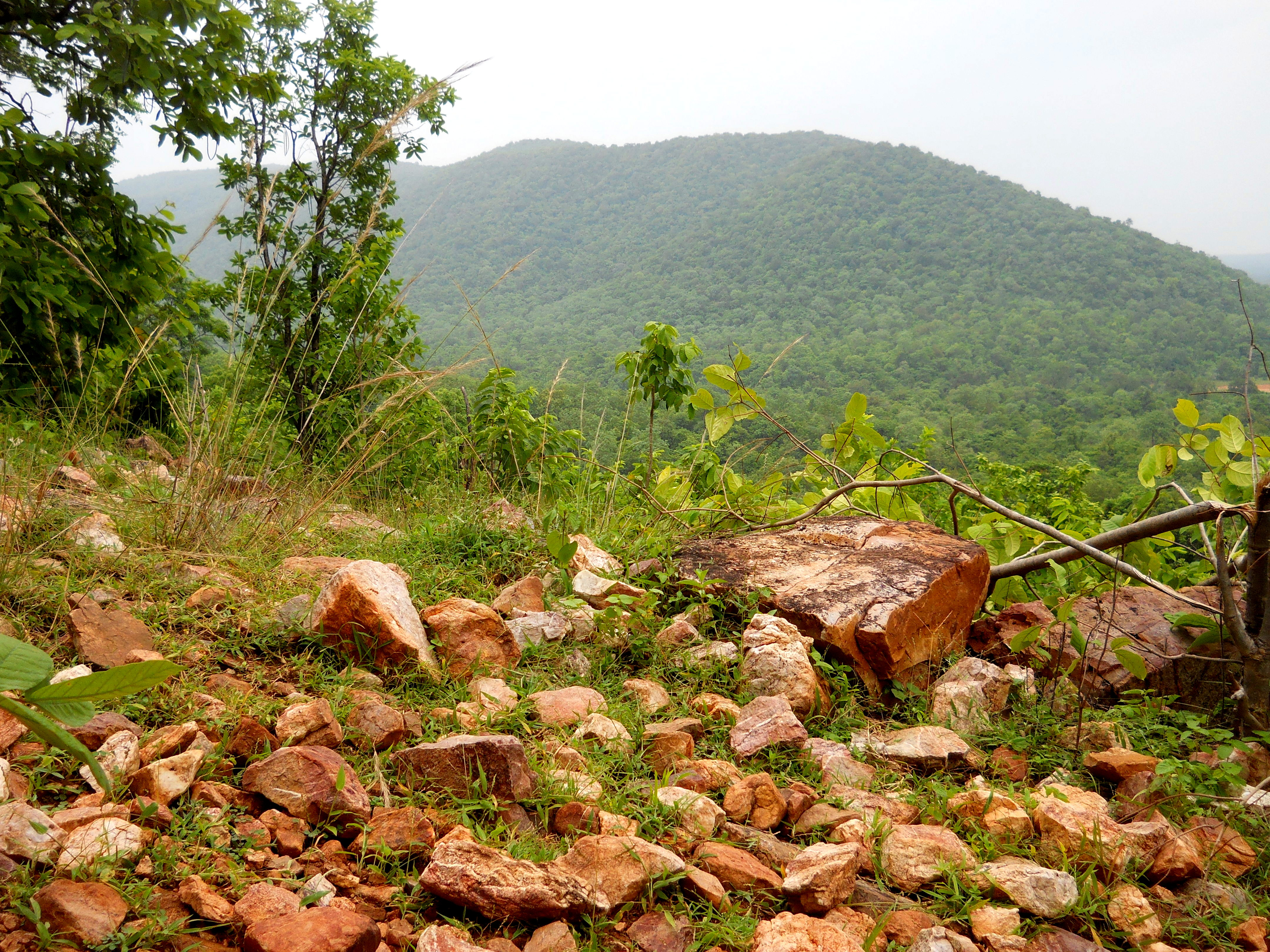
forest area in temri village

Temri has an average elevation of 265 metres (869 ft) and is almost 104 kilometres (65 mi) from its district headquarters, Bargarh. It is about 472 kilometres (293 mi) from its capital city of Bhubaneshwar. Temri is a Gram panchayat of Paikmal block from which it lies about 18 kilometres (11 mi) away. The area around Temri is rain-fed and hence is prone to frequent droughts. The Gandhamardhan hills are about 25 kilometres (16 mi) away and form the borders between the Bargarh and Balangir districts. Hills surround Temri village in three directions while the Magaranalla Dam is about 3 kilometres (1.9 mi) away.

== Demographics ==
As of the 2001 India census, Temri had a population of 2,093. The male population was 1,045 and females population was 1,048. Temri has a literacy rate about nearly 61% per capita income is very low.

== Main Festivals ==
As this village belongs to the western part of the odisha, so as usual the main festival is Nuakhai and Puspuni. Besides these the village is observing "Laxmi pooja" festival from last 26 years, which is well known in this region.
