= Khatoo, Rajasthan =

Town in Rajasthan, India

KhatuShyam Ji
- Town
- Khatu
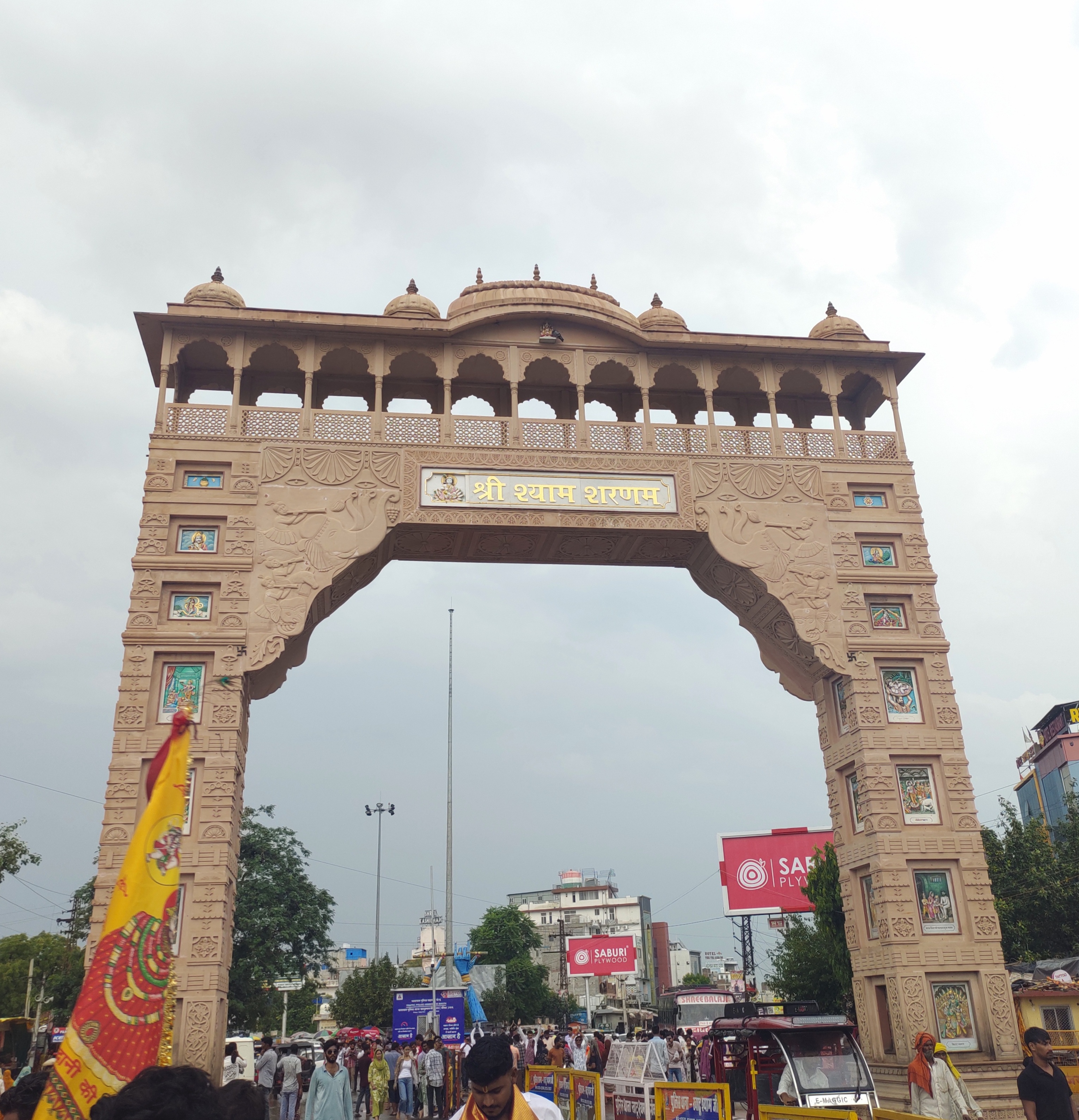
- Entrance gate of Khatu

- Location in Rajasthan, India KhatuShyam Ji (India)
- Coordinates: 27.363954°N 75.402557°E
- Country: India
- State: Rajasthan
- District: Sikar

Government
  - Type: Nagar Palika Khatu
  - Body: Sikar-Khatoo Nagar Palika

Languages
  - Official: Hindi
- Time zone: UTC+5:30 (IST)
- ISO 3166 code: RJ-IN
- Vehicle registration: RJ-
- Website: khatu.co.in

Khatu, also known as KhatuShyam Ji, is a town of religious importance located in the Sikar district of the Indian state of Rajasthan. It is approximately 43 km from Sikar city and 17 km from Reengus town. Situated in the Dhundhar region, Khatu is known for the Khatu Shyam Temple ( Barbareek ), one of Rajasthan’s most sacred Hindu pilgrimage sites.

== Demographics ==
As per the 2011 census of India, the total population of Khatu was 11,374, out of which 5800 are males and 5574 were females. The literacy rate of Khatu was 73.9%, slightly higher than state average of 66.11%.

== Khatu Shyam temple ==
In Khatu, Khatu Shyam Ji Temple is situated dedicated to Barbaeek, worshipped here as Shyam Baba or Morvinandan Shyam, the temple is a pilgrimage site for devotees across India. According to legend, Barbareek, a warrior from the Mahabharata, sacrificed his life to fulfill a vow, and his head was granted divine status by Lord Krishna, leading to his veneration at this site. The temple attracts millions devotees during the annual Falgun Mela festival.

The Earliest Literary evidence of this shrine dates back to The 17th century in a poem containing 25 couplets known as Shyam Pacchisi composed by Durga Das Mathur in Braj Bhasha during 1675. But in this poem Shyam isn't referred to and identified with Barbarika but instead he's identified with Krishna and Khatu is referred to as his capital.

== Notable people ==
- Bajrang Lal Takhar, Indian rover and gold medalist at the 2010 Asian Games
- Narayan Singh Burdak, Indian politician and former president of Rajasthan Pradesh Congress Committee
- Virendra Singh Burdak, Indian politician and son of Narayan Singh Burdak
