= Turcha =

Village in Bargarh district, Odisha, India

Coordinates: 20°53′24″N 83°18′37″E

- Interactive map of Turcha
- Country: India
- State: Odisha
- District: Bargarh

Population
  - Total: 1,200
- Time zone: UTC+5:30 (Indian Standard Time)

Turcha is a village of Gaisilat block in Bargarh district, Odisha, India.
