= Melchhamunda =

- Village
- Location in Odisha, India
- Coordinates: 21°5′0″N 83°15′0″E
- Country: India
- State: Odisha
- District: Bargarh

Languages
  - Official: Odia
- Time zone: UTC+5:30 (IST)
- Vehicle registration: OD-

Melchhamunda is a town in Bargarh district in the Indian state Odisha. It is situated 21 km from Padampur and 60 km from Bargarh on the Padampur state highway. Buddhist relics have been found at Ganiapali 10 km from the village, and it is identified with ancient Muchalinda, which is said to be a centre of Buddhist learning. The Bhoi Family are the head of the village.

Melchhamunda was an Assembly Constituency Seat up to 2009.

Diptipur (part of revenue village Jhununga pali) is just 1 km from here. It is noted for the missionary activities of the Utkal Christian Council which started work here in 1956. The activities of the Mission are divided into 3 wings - Health, Education and Agriculture. A dispensary was started in the year 1957, which then became a hospital in 1958.
