= Achhandapali =

Village in Odisha

Coordinates: 21.172602°N 83.752936°E

Achhandapali village is located in Bheden Block of Bargarh district of Odisha, India. It belongs to Luhakhandi Panchayat. Villages close to Achhandapali are Barpadar, Hiromunda, Jampali, Luhakhandi, Pankeldadar, Pudapali.
