= Jagtarandas =

Indian politician

Jagtarandas was an Indian politician. At the time of the Independence of India, Jagtarandas and his brothers Muktavandas and Atibaldas, led a faction in local Bhandarpuri politics. Their group mobilized lower caste Chhattisgarhi population and was close to the Scheduled Castes Federation of B.R. Ambedkar and the local pro-British tendencies. He was elected from the reserved Scheduled Castes seat in Bemetara in the 1952 Madhya Pradesh Legislative Assembly election, running as an Indian National Congress candidate. He died shortly thereafter, and in February 1954 a by-election was organized to elect a new legislator for the Bemetara seat, in which the Congress candidate Sheolal was elected unopposed.
