= Kanakbira =

- rural
- Location in Odisha, India Kanakbira (India)
- Coordinates: 21.489751°N 83.486180°E
- Country: India
- State: Odisha
- District: Bargarh

Population (2011)
  - Total: 1,417
- Time zone: UTC+5:30 (IST)
- PIN: 768030

Kanak Bira is a village in Odisha, India. It is located in the Bhatli block of Bargarh district.

== Education ==
Only one high school in this village serves the whole Kelendapali Panchayat.

=== Panchayat High School, Kanak Bira ===
Only unaided private high school, poorly aided teacher and infrastructure is not helping student around the area.

=== Upper Primary School ===
It is vernacular language school.

== Economy ==
Agriculture is the major source. Some people engage in daily labourer for a living. Agriculture is not advancing due to lack of irrigation facility.

== Health and sanitation ==
A Government-funded water supply system has existed since 2011. People still use traditional way of bathing at unhygienic pond. People still go for toilet outside filled and roadside.

== Connectivity ==
Pradhan Mantri Gram sadak Yajna road is connected to nearest town Bhatli. Telecommunication service is advancing and internet user are increasing.
