= Bhatli =

- Town
- Location in Odisha, India Bhatli (India)
- Coordinates: 21.46409°N 83.545189°E
- Country: India
- State: Odisha
- District: Bargarh

Languages
  - Official: Odia
- Time zone: UTC+5:30 (IST)
- PIN: 768030

Bhatli is a town in Bargarh district, Odisha.

== Geography ==
Bhatli is located in Western Odisha, close to the border of neighbouring state of Chhattisgarh. It is positioned at 21.526°N 82.890°E. The whole of Bargarh district lies in the Deccan Plateau with Eastern Ghats running close to the town. As per the earthquake zoning of India, Bhatli falls in the zone 2 category, the least earthquake prone zone.

== Educational institute ==
Dadhibaman College, Bhatli (Affiliated to Sambalpur University). It is the only college of the town.

Boys High School for Boys.

Satihari Girls School for girls.

Nivedita Public School (CBSE)

Saraswati Sishu Vidya Mandir

== Economy ==
Major employment source of people are agricultural activities. A significant population of the weaver community is engaged in Handloom activities, producing famous sambalpuri saree. A small section of the population is dependent on trade. In terms of industry, this area is yet to attend its full potential.

== Health services ==
State Government Community Health Centre is providing primary health service to this area. Dr Debasish Biswal is the medical officer of the community health centre. CHC Bhatli got a commendation award by the state government in Kayakalpa activities, only CHC got this award in the district of Bargarh in 2019.And again continuously in 2020,2021 and 2022. Navjeeban Chikistalaya is the only private hospital serving the Bhatli locality. NGO like Abhyudaya are working for sustainable health care by alternative remedies. These organizations creates awareness on harmful effects of chemical farming, poisoned food systems and water.

== Festivals ==
=== Ratha-Yatra ===
Every year Ratha-Yatra is celebrated in the Dadhubamana Temple in accordance with Jagannath Temple Ratha-Yatra in Puri. It is not only famous in the whole Bargarh District, but also in entire western odisha. Local devotee comes with enthusiasm and pay tribute by pulling the ratha to the Rathadanda Padia. Bhatli is also known as Srikhetera of paschim odisha. To witness the Ratha Yatra devotees comes in large numbers. On the 10th day the Bahuda Yatra is also celebrated, again in accordance with Ratha Yatra in Puri.

=== Phalguna Mela ===
This is one type of carnivals of religious nature. It is celebrated by the Marwadi community from the local area in the Shyam temple. The most important festival associated with the temple is the Phalguna Mela, which occurs just 8–9 days before the festival of Holi. Barbarika's head appeared on Phalguna Shuddha Ekadashi, the 11th day of the bright half of the Hindu month of Phalguna. Therefore, the fair is held from the 9th to the 12th of that month. The fair has now been extended to nearly 12–15 days of the bright half of the Phalguna Month.

Khatushyamji Rath idol during Pad Yatra from Temple to road nearby up to some distance. On this holy occasion pilgrims all over the country come here on foot with nishaans (holy mark - flags) in their hands. People enjoy their holy journey by singing shyam bhajans and playing various musical instruments. They enjoy the journey by playing holi with gulal. Many Shyam Bhaktas supply food to pedestrians in the shade of tents. They encourage also to complete their journey with full enthusiasm. They enjoy this occasion as the marriage of Khatushyamji. People enjoy the mela by purchasing various things. On Dwadashi (= 12th day of month), Bhog is being prepared as Baba's Prasadi of Kheer, Churama.

=== Gobardhan Puja ===
Also This area is famous for the giri Gobardhan Puja of KUISIRA Village.

== Administration ==
Bhatli is one of the block of 314 developmental blocks of Odisha. It is a tehsil. It is a constituent assembly for Odisha Legislative Assembly, Bhatli Constituency. It is also a Gram Panchayat of Panchayati Raj Institution of the tier 3 governance pattern of India. Its district headquarters is in Bargarh.

=== Odisha Legislative Assembly ===
Bhatli Constituency Current MLA is IRASHISH ACHARYA

=== Community Development Block ===
It is the block headquarter of 84 villages.

==== List of villages ====
1. Amlipali
2. Badamlipali
3. Badapali
4. Badmal
5. Banjipali
6. Baratunda
7. Baulsingha
8. Beherapali
9. Bhadigoan
10. Bhatli
11. Bhinjetora
12. Bhojpuri
13. Bichhuan
14. Bisalpali
15. Chadeigan
16. Chorgrindola
17. Dablang
18. Deultunda
19. Dumalpali
20. Gaurgaon
21. Gopalpur
22. Gourpali
23. Haladipali
24. Halanda
25. Halupali
26. Harasankri
27. Hatisar
28. Jadamunda
29. Jagatipali
30. Jampali
31. Jara
32. Jaypur
33. Jhankarpali
34. Jharmunda
35. Jhikjhiki
36. Kahenmunda
37. Kamgoan
38. Kanakbira
39. Kandiapali
40. Karlajori
41. Karlakhai
42. Kasipali
43. Kelendapali
44. Kenduguria
45. Kesaipali
46. Khajuria
47. Khaliapali
48. Kharmora
49. Kharsal
50. Khirat
51. Kuisira
52. Kultapali
53. Kushanpuri
54. Latipali
55. Mahada
56. Mahulpali
57. Mendhapali
58. Mulbar
59. Murumkel
60. Nalichuan
61. Narangapur
62. Nilji
63. Nuagarh
64. Pandakipali
65. Pandaritarai
66. Raisobha
67. Rautpada
68. Runipali
69. Rusipali
70. Samardarha
71. Saradhapali
72. Sirabahal
73. Sirapali
74. Sukuda
75. Sukudadanbirti
76. Sulusulia
77. Tala
78. Talpali
79. Tarakana
80. Tejagula
81. Temren
82. Tukurla
83. Udhaipali
84. Urdduna

== Communication ==
Bhatli is only 18 km by road from the district headquarter and well connected by state highway.

== Temple ==
=== Dadhibaman temple ===
It is a temple of god dadhibaman, incarnation of lord Vishnu.

=== BhatliShyam Temple ===
It is temple of Baba Shyam. It is second in all in India of its type.

Jagannath temple KUISIRA

== Place of Attraction ==
Near to Bhatli is Debrigarh Wildlife Sanctuary. And Giri Govardhan park KUISIRA,Aapkhol water fall near sardhapali.
