= Satibhata Airstrip =

Airport in Odisha, India

Satibhata Airstrip Padmapur Airstrip
- IATA: none; ICAO: VEPP

Summary
- Airport type: Public
- Owner: Government of Odisha
- Serves: Bargarh
- Location: Padmapur, Odisha, India
- Elevation AMSL: 705 ft / 215 m
- Coordinates: 21°02′23.97″N 83°02′19.48″E

Map
- Location in Odisha Satibhata Airstrip (India)

Runways
Direction	Length		Surface
Direction	m	ft	Surface
11/29	1,035	3,395	Asphalt

Satibhata Airstrip also known as Padmapur Airstrip, is located 6 km from the Padmapur city center in western Odisha, India. Nearest airport to this airstrip is Raipur's Swami Vivekananda Airport in the state of Chhattisgarh (137 km). The airport serves Padmapur city in the Bargarh district of Odisha.
