= Jogimunda =

- Village
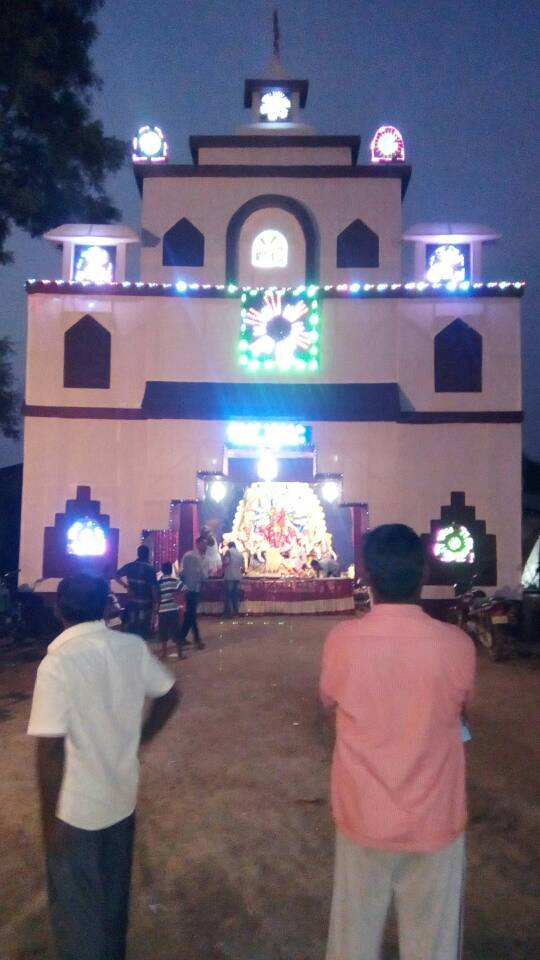

- Location in Odisha, India Jogimunda (India)
- Coordinates: 20.747174°N 83.028133°E
- Country: India
- State: Odisha
- District: Bolangir
- Elevation: 243 m (797 ft)

Population (2005)
  - Total: 2,145

Languages
  - Official: Odia
- Time zone: UTC+5:30 (IST)
- Vehicle registration: OD
- Website: odisha.gov.in

Jogimunda is a village Panchayat in Bolangir district in the Indian state of Odisha. The official language is Odia. The village which is on the State Highway No.42, also houses the Panchayat Office and is a bustling rural economy with all the basic infrastructure like college, hospital. Jogimunda is one of the busiest trading center in the area with more than 40 villages depending on it for their economic activities.

== Geography ==
It is situated 15 km from sub-district headquarter Patnagarh and 55 km away from district headquarter Balangir. The total geographical area of village is 384 hectares. Jogimunda has a total population of 2,145 peoples. There are about 532 houses in Jogimunda village. The famous tourist spot Harishankar is 25 km from the village.

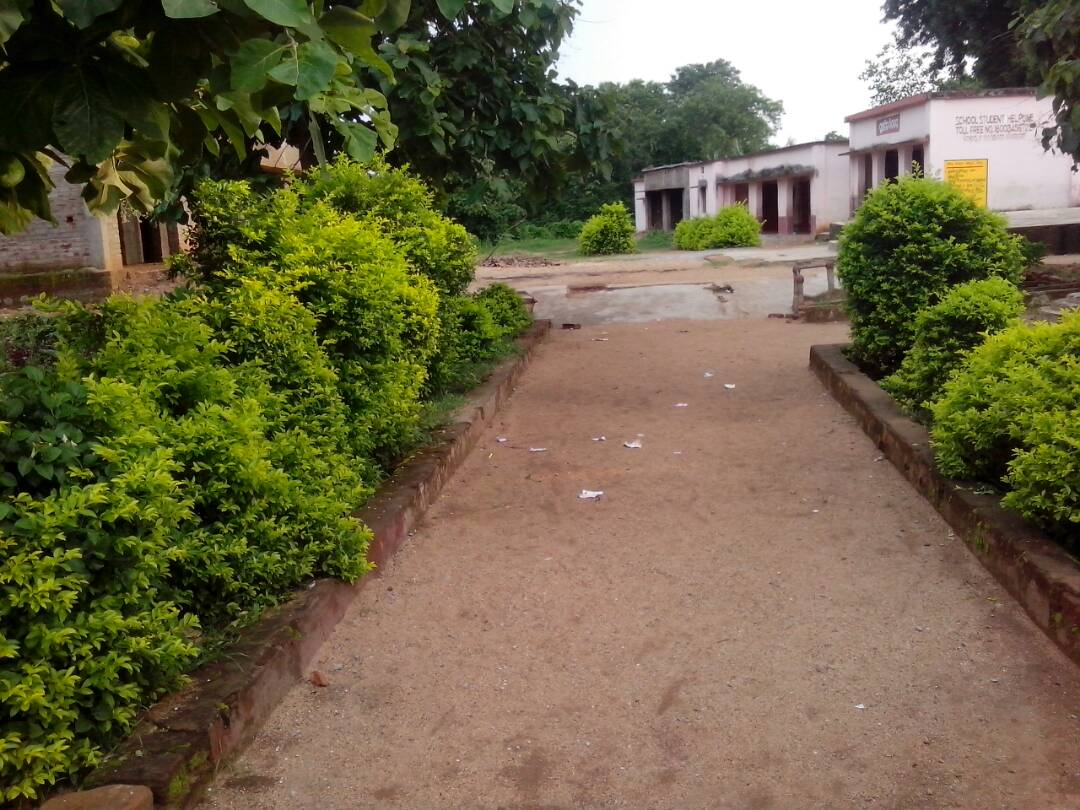
Jogimunda Primary school: Established in 1911

== Economy ==
Jogimunda has one of the largest cotton market yard operated by REGULATED MARKET COMMITTEE (RMC) . It has a growing rural economy based on trading of rice, cotton and other agricultural products. The weekly vegetable and cattle market is one of the largest in the district. Utkala Gramya Bank has a full-fledged office in the village which mainly caters to the banking needs of the people. There are also many kiosk banks offering their services like SBI and PNB.

== Politics ==
Current Sarpanch from Jogimunda Panchayat is Shree Rajendra Behera, who won the seat in elections in February 2017.

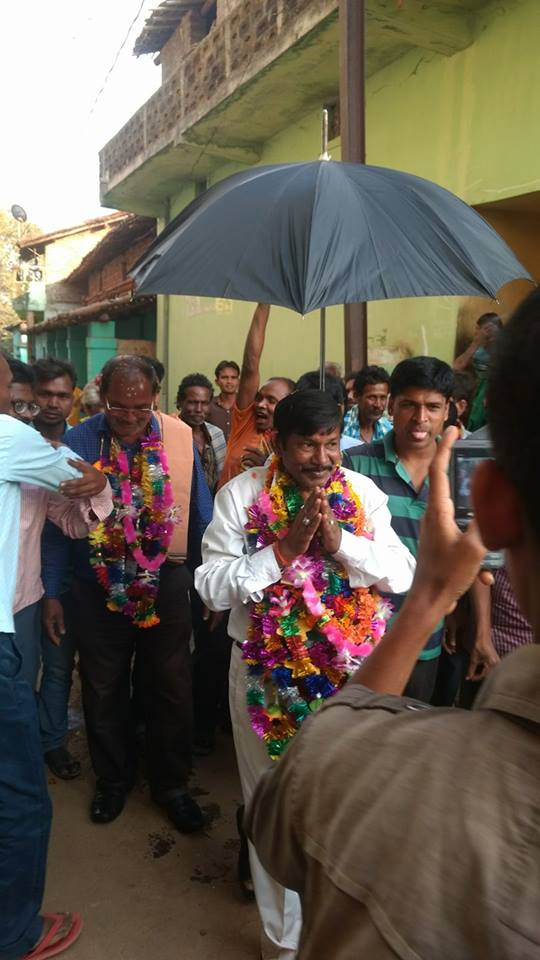
Sarpanch of Jogimunda Rajendra Behera

== Education ==
The village has good educational institutions, such as Rajendra Meher College (co -edu), Jogimunda high school, Saraswati shishu vidya mandir. And other Primary schools. Jogimunda Primary school was established in 1911 by the king of Patna State, which is currently one of the oldest school in the country. Jogimunda High School is an Upper Primary with Secondary School in Jogimunda Village of Patnagarh. It was established in the year 1964 and the school management is Department of Education. It's an Odia Medium - Co-educational school.

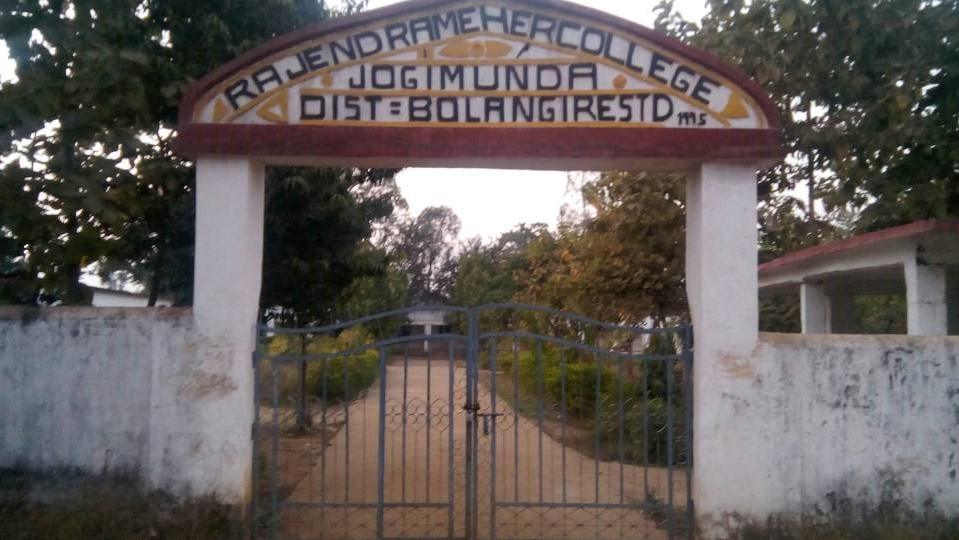
Jogimunda college

The college Rajendra Meher college was founded in the year 1995, and recognized by the Govt. of Odisha in the year 1999 and affiliated to Council of Higher Secondary Education, odisha which conduct Annual Higher Secondary Examination in the month of March every year . During its early rise it was working in a private mansion called "Yuba Sanskriti Parisad" and later in 2003 it was shifted to its own independent building having a few numbers of quarters for the students and staff. The college was initially had a sanction strength of 64 seats and there was an increase of seats to 128 in the year 2007, to 192 in the year 2010 and finally 256 in the year 2013 considering the interest of the students at large. Now the college has grown into a big one and one of the reputed institution in Patnagarh Block. It has almost all kind of facilities for the students like drinking water, separate urinal & latrine for both boys and girls, Common room for boys and girls, a huge playground is available at the backside of the administrative block meant for game and sports. The college has also a NSS wing and a YRC unit that provide and instill in the students voluntary social service in nearby villages of the locality.

The college now imparts education to the students in various subjects. Subject likes-Pol-science, History, Education, Economics, Sociology, Language Odia, Information Technology are there as optional along with compulsory English and Mil.

== Dhanu yatra ==
Dhanu jatra or Dhanu yatra is an annual drama-based open air theatrical performance celebrated in Jogimunda . It is one of the largest open air theater in the district. It is based on mythological story of Krishna (locally known as Krusna), and his demon uncle Kansa. During the 7 days festival the village turns into a mini Disneyland.

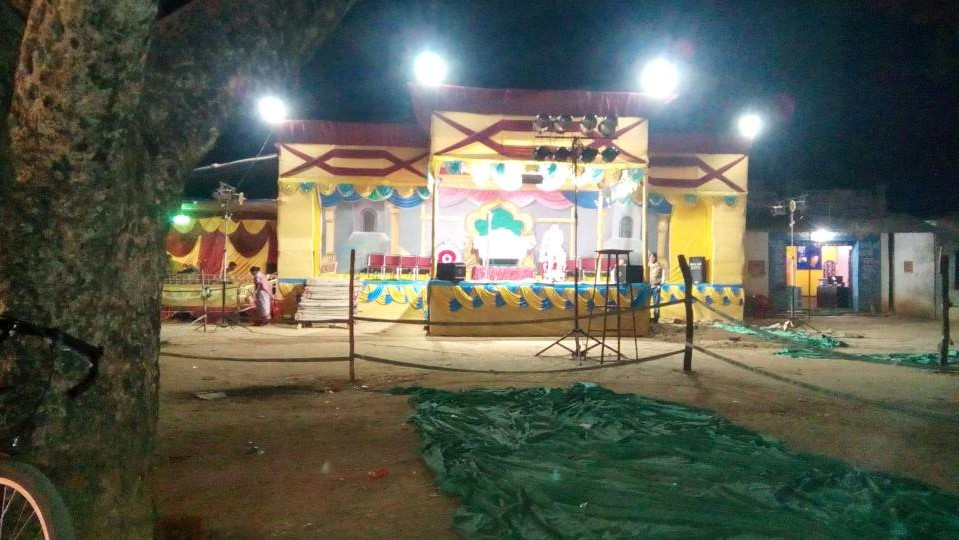
Dhanu Yatra Jogimunda, 2017

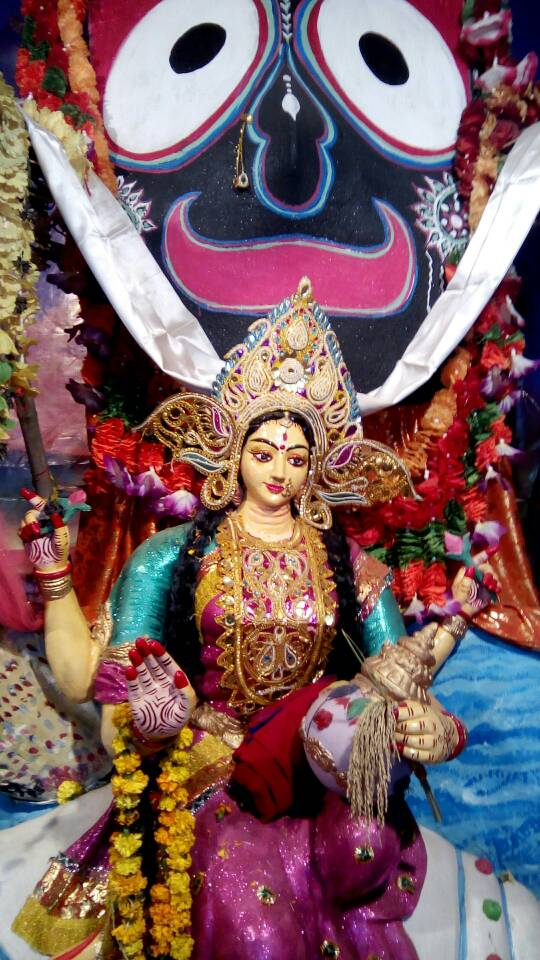
Goddess Laxmi, 2017

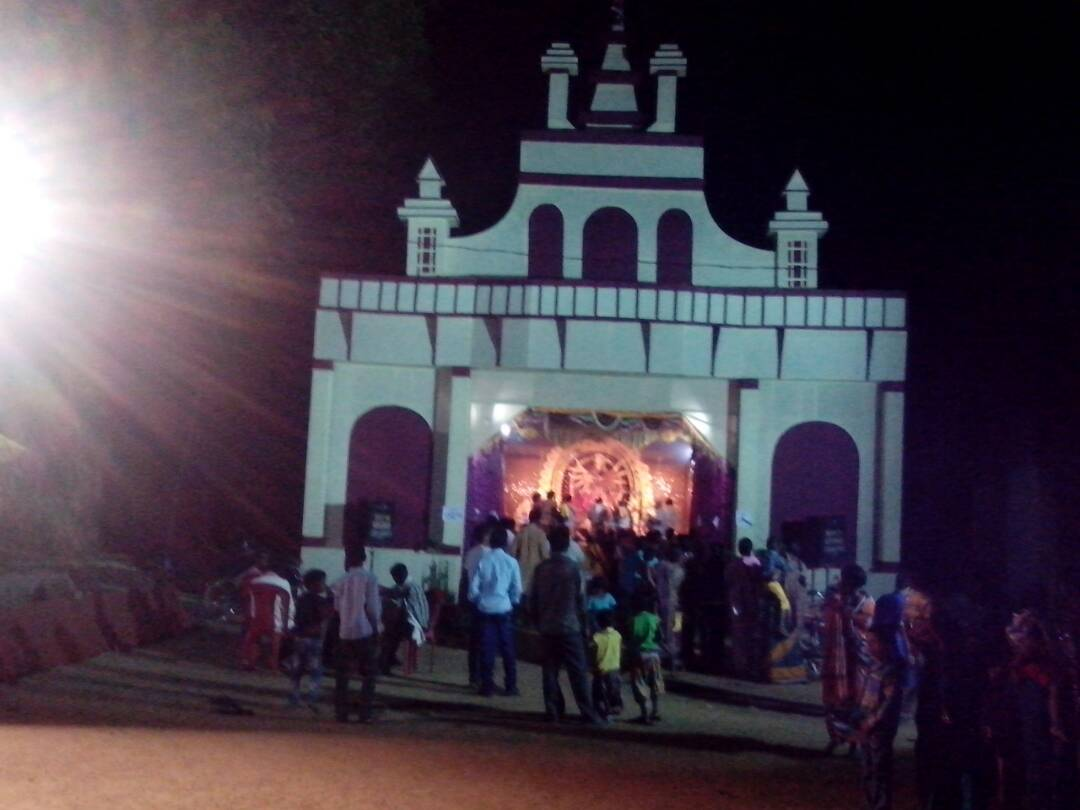
Durga Pooja, 2017

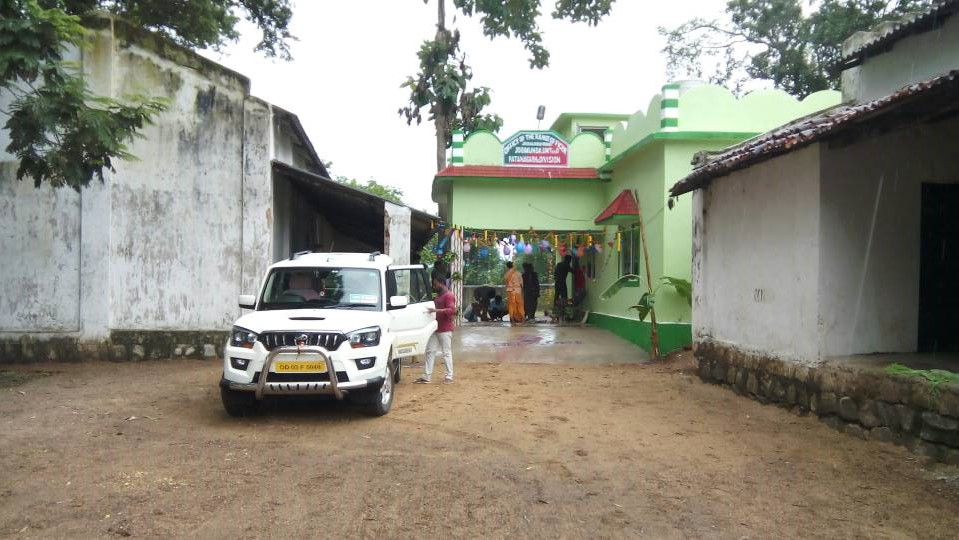
Jogimunda KL Range Office, 2017
