= Khatu Shyam Temple =

Hindu temple in Rajasthan, India

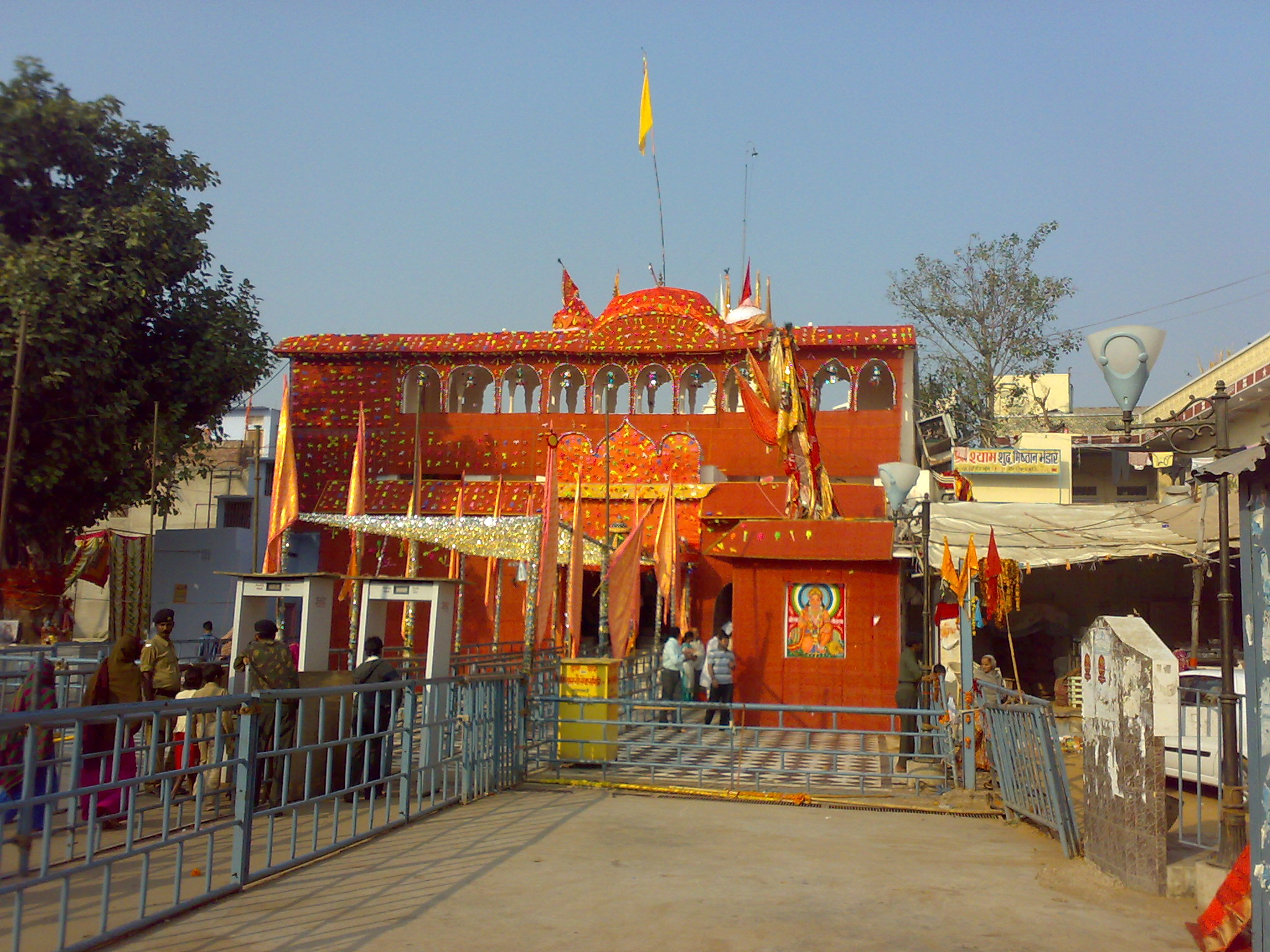
- Khatu Shyam Temple in 2008

- Location in Rajasthan Location in India

Religion
- Affiliation: Hinduism
- District: Sikar
- Deity: Barbarika

Location
- Location: Khatoo, Sikar district, Rajasthan
- State: Rajasthan
- Country: India
- Coordinates: 27.3645°N 75.4033°E

Website
- https://khatu-shyam.in/

Khatu Shyam Ji Temple is a Hindu temple located in KhatuShyamJi town in the Sikar district of Rajasthan. It is a pilgrimage site dedicated to the worship of Khatu Shyam, a divine figure believed to be a manifestation of Barbareek, a character from the Indian epic Mahabharat. The temple is one of the most revered religious sites in Rajasthan, attracting millions of devotees annually, particularly during the Falgun Mela, a festival held in the Hindu month of Falgun (February–March).

== History ==
According to legend, the temple was originally constructed in 1027 CE by Roop Singh Chauhan, a local ruler. In his dream, he was guided to unearth a buried idol of Barbareek, believed to be the head of the warrior, at a site now known as Shyam Kund, a sacred pond near the temple. The idol was installed in the temple, marking the beginning of its veneration as a holy site. The current structure of the temple, built with white Makrana marble, reflects traditional Rajasthani architecture.

The temple’s prominence grew over centuries, particularly due to its connection with Barbareek, a legendary figure from the Indian epic Mahabharata. Barbareek, the son of Ghatotkach & Kaamktankta (Morvi) and grandson of the Pandava Bhima & Hidimba, is revered as Khatu Shyam Ji, believed that he is blessed by Lord Krishna in the Kaliyug.

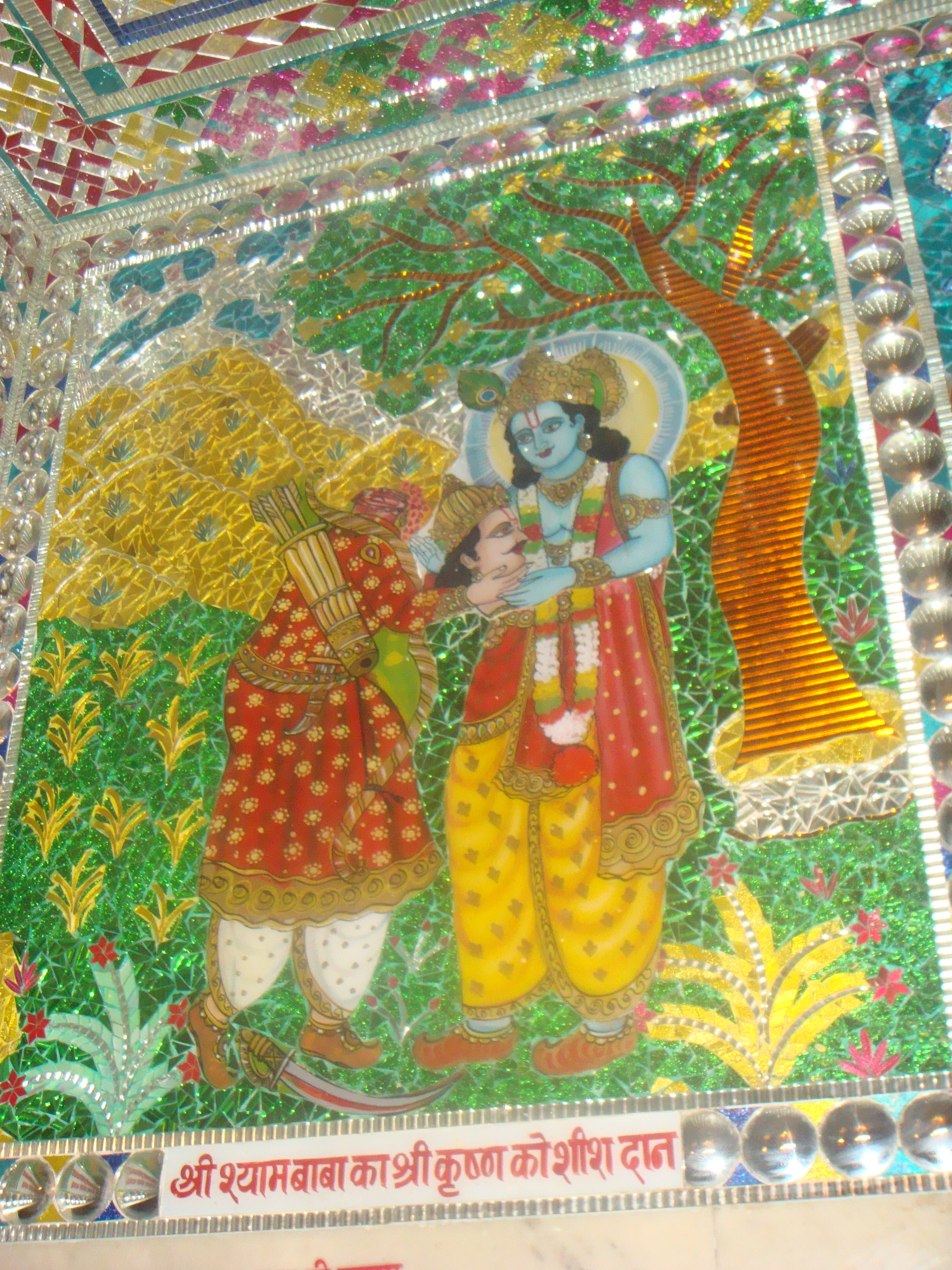
Barbarika donates his head to Lord Krishna

According to tradition, Lord Krishna blessed Barbareek with the boon that he would be worshipped in this age under the name Shyam. A 17th century poem containing 25 couplets known as Shyam Pacchisi composed by Durga Das Mathur in Braj Bhasha during 1675. The temple’s historical significance was further cemented during the medieval period, including events like the Battle of Khatu Shyamji in 1779, where local chiefs defended the region against Mughal forces.

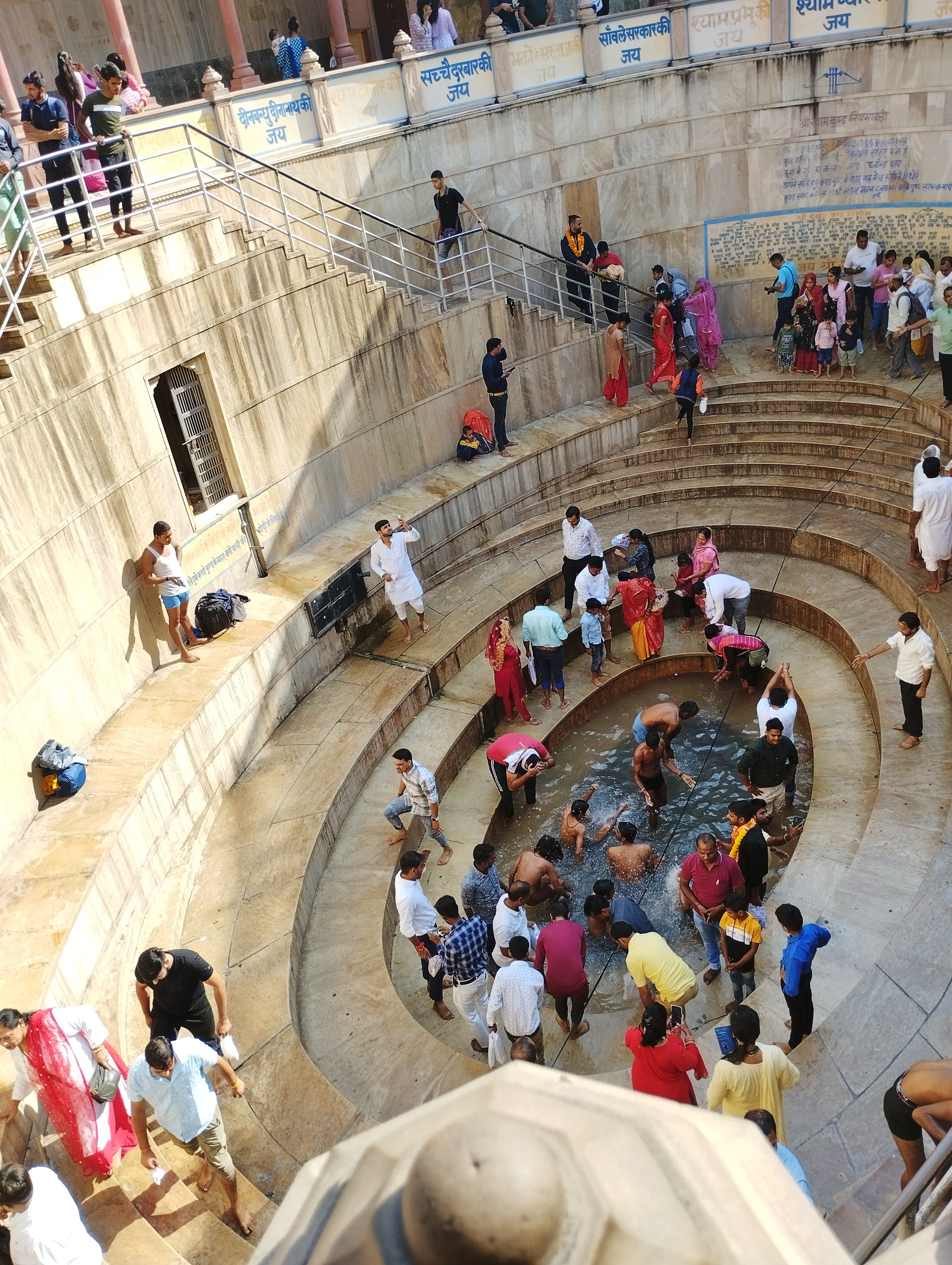
Shyam kund at holy temple

Origin and mythology

The origins of the Khatu Shyam Ji Temple are deeply rooted in Hindu mythology, specifically the epic Mahabharat. The deity worshipped here, Khatu Shyam Ji, is believed to be Barbareek, the grandson of Bhima (one of the Pandav brothers) and son of Ghatotkacha. According to legend, Barbareek was a powerful warrior who possessed three divine arrows capable of determining the outcome of the Kurukshetra war. To ensure fairness in the battle, Lord Krishna, disguised as a Brahmin, tested Barbarika’s resolve and ultimately asked him to sacrifice his head as an act of charity. Impressed by his devotion and selflessness, Krishna blessed Barbareek, declaring that he would be worshipped as Shyam (another name for Krishna) in the Kaliyug (last of four yugas in Hindu cosmology). The temple is believed to house the head of Barbarika, making it a sacred site for devotees.

== Nishaan Yatra ==
Nishaan Yatra is a revered pilgrimage honouring Khatu Shyam Ji, a deity linked to Lord Krishna and Barbareek, held annually in Khatu, Rajasthan. During the Falgun Mela, lakhs of devotees participate in this procession, carrying a Nishan—a sacred triangular flag in saffron, orange, or red—symbolising devotion. Pilgrims typically travel on foot from Reengus to the Khatu Shyam Temple, covering a distance of about 17 km, chanting prayers, singing bhajans, and dancing. The flag is offered at the temple to seek blessings.

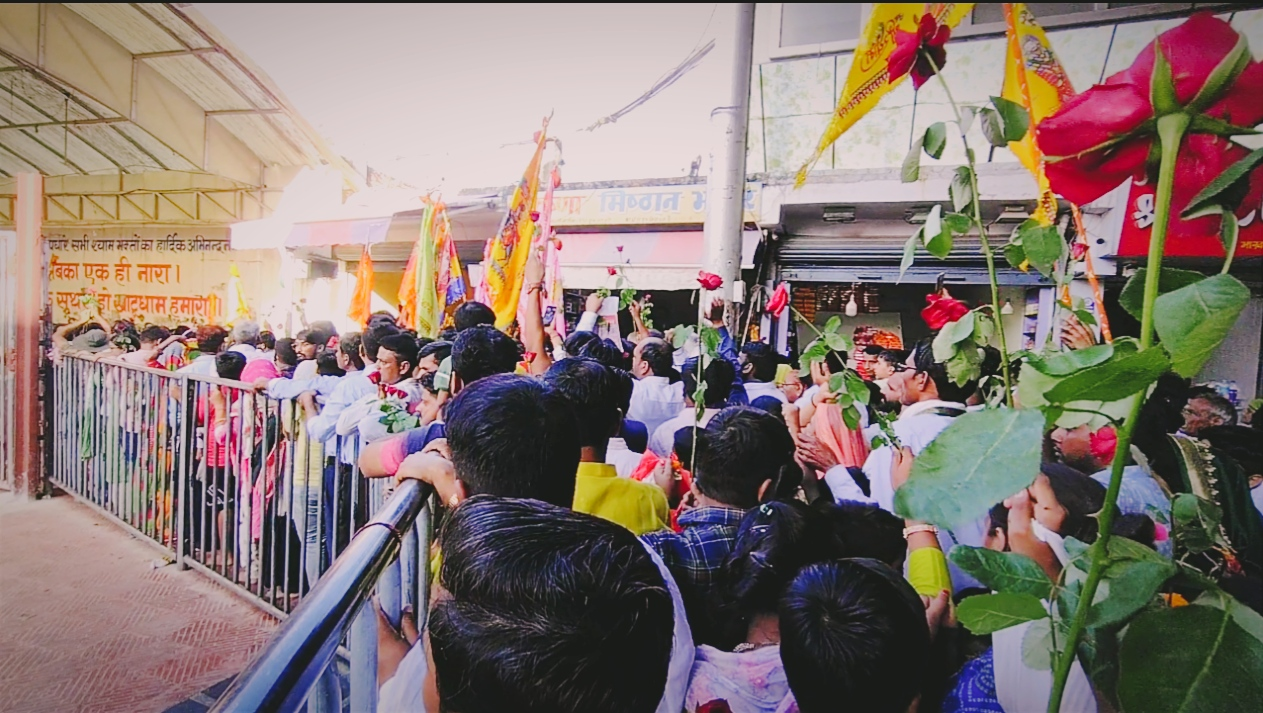
Nishan Yatra at temple

The Surajgarh white flag is hoisted annually top of the Khatu Shyam temple during the Falgun Mela. Originating from Surajgarh, a town on the Haryana–Rajasthan border, this flag, adorned with a blue horse, has been raised for over 300 years. It embodies a rich history tied to resistance against Mughal and British attempts to disrupt temple practices.

Crafted in Surajgarh’s ancient temple, the flag is carried in a 152-km padyatra (foot pilgrimage) to Khatu Shyam. The flag, believed to house Baba Shyam’s divine presence, is hoisted on Falgun Shukla Paksha.

== See also ==
- Salasar Balaji Temple
- Jeenmata
