= Shree Shyam Mandir, Ghusuri =

Temple in Howrah

Religion
- Affiliation: Hinduism

Location
- Location: Ghusuri, Howrah
- State: West Bengal
- Country: India

Architecture
- Creator: Shree Shyam Satsang Mandal

Shree Shyam Mandir, Ghusuri is a temple located in Howrah, one of the main trade hubs in the Indian city of Kolkata. Ghusuri Dham is the biggest Khatu Shyam Temple in Eastern Region of India.

== Brief history ==
The temple was built by Shree Shyam Satsang Mandal, Ghusuridham with the help and support of Shyam Bhakts in Kolkata.

== Opening times ==
The temple remains open from 6:00 a.m. to 1:00 p.m. and 4:00 pm to 9:00 p.m.
