= Debrigarh Wildlife Sanctuary =

Protected area in Odisha, India

- IUCN category IV (habitat/species management area)
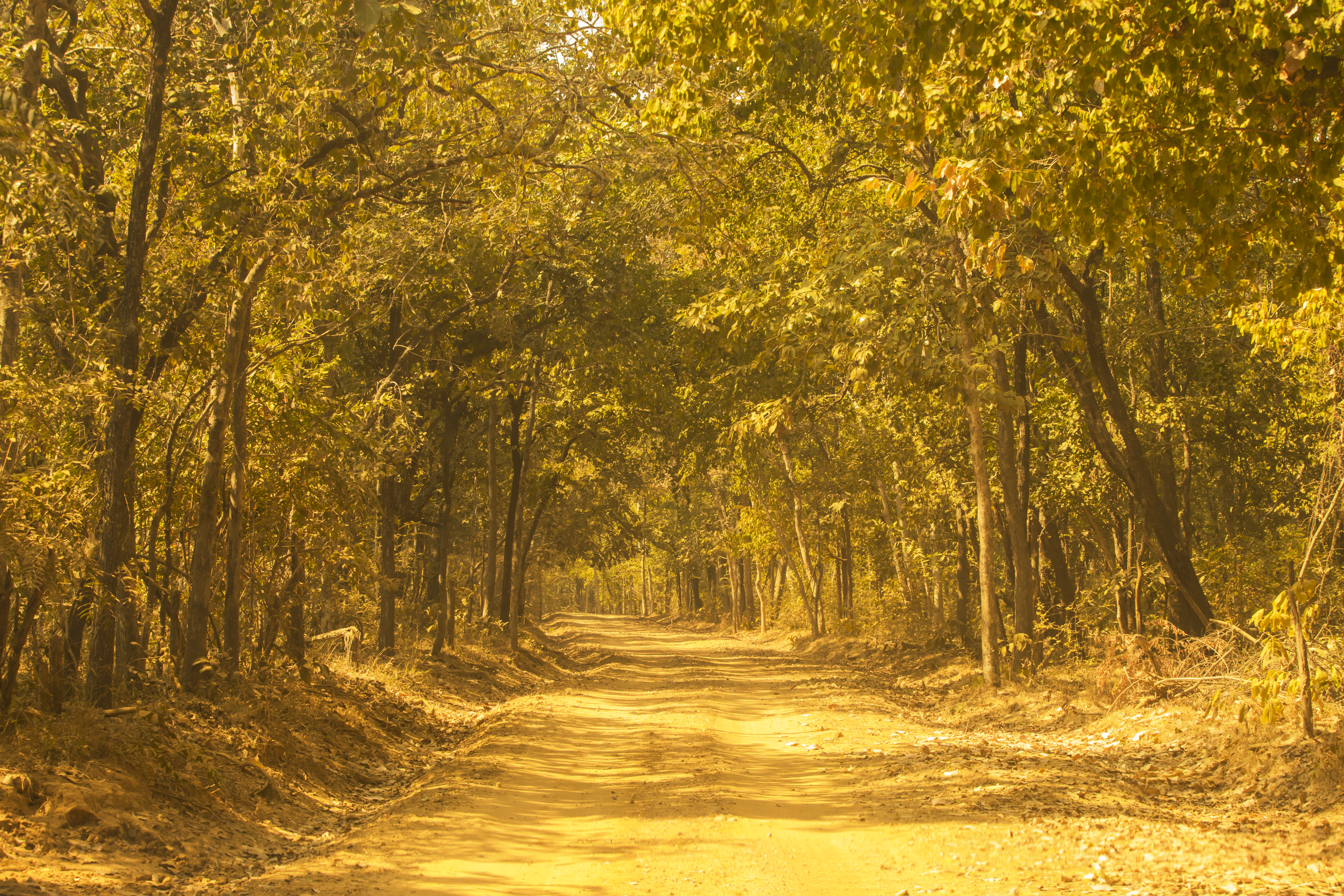

- Location within Odisha Location within India
- Location in Odisha
- Interactive map of Debrigarh Wildlife Sanctuary
- Coordinates: 21.557097°N 83.646108°E
- Area: 346.91 km^{2} (133.94 sq mi)

The Debrigarh wildlife sanctuary is located in the Bargarh district in the Indian state of Odisha, covering a total area of 346.91 km^{2}. It is situated near the city of Sambalpur's Hirakud Dam. The Debrigarh Wildlife Sanctuary is an important location for the conservation of various local wildlife and their habitat.

== Geography ==
The sanctuary is bound on the east and north by the huge Hirakud reservoir. It is one of the select few sanctuaries in the state supporting both terrestrial and aquatic biodiversity; which further attracts a significant number of migratory waterfowl during winter; and is also home to over 250 plant species, many of which have ethno-botanical and medicinal value.

Debrigarh Wildlife Sanctuary is a Eco-Sensitive Zone from both an ecological and environmental point of view and to prohibit industries or class of industries and their operations and processes in the said Eco-Sensitive Zone.

== Wildlife ==
The sanctuary is home to a wide variety of flora and fauna. Over 40 species of mammals, 200 species of birds, 40 species of reptiles, 12 species of amphibians, 42 species of fishes, 39 species of odonates, 85 species of butterflies and 38 species of spiders have been found living in the sanctuary.

Debrigarh is habitat of variety of wild animals including cheetal, sambar deer, wild boar, Gaur, chowsingha, peacock, langur, bear, leopard and Indian wild dog.
