= Paikmal =

- Town
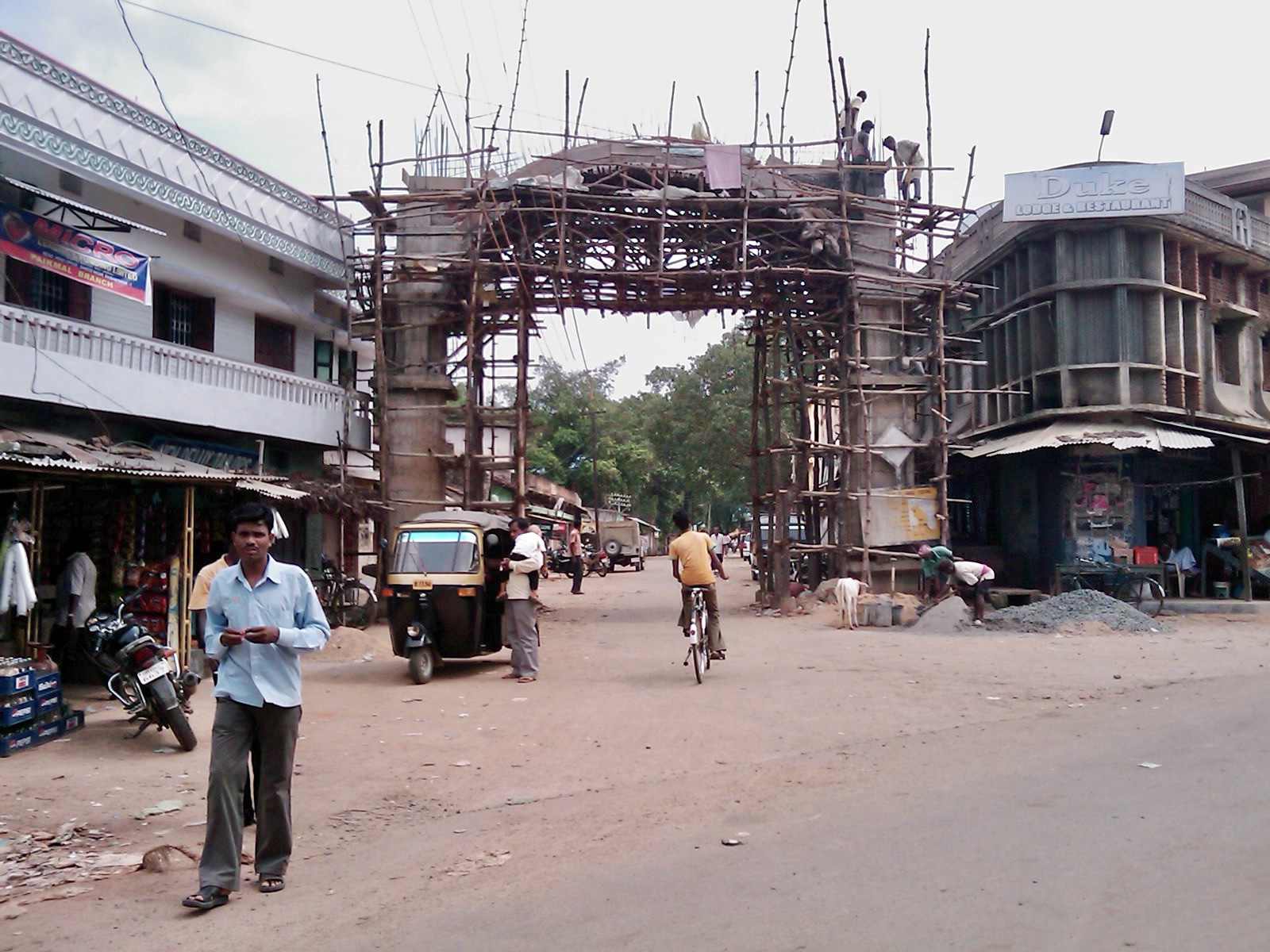

- Location in Odisha, India Paikmal (India)
- Coordinates: 20°55′N 82°49′E
- Country: India
- State: Odisha
- District: Bargarh

Government
  - Type: Block, Notified Area Council(NAC)
- Elevation: 265 m (869 ft)

Population (2001)
  - Total: 3,916

Languages
  - Official: Odia
  - Local: Sambalpuri
- Time zone: UTC+5:30 (IST)
- PIN: 768039
- Vehicle registration: OD17
- Website: odisha.gov.in

Paikmal is a town and Block Head Quarter in Bargarh district of Odisha state in eastern India. The location is famous for Nrusinghanath Temple.

== Geography ==
Paikmal is located at 20.55°N 82.49°E. It has an average elevation of 265 metres (869 ft). It is almost 107 kilometres (66 mi) from its district headquarters, Bargarh. It is about 477 kilometres (296 mi) from its capital city of Bhubaneshwar. Paikmal is a block of Padampur subdivision, distance from Paikmal to Padampur is about 31 kilometres (19 mi). One can reach Paikmal from Padampur Bargarh District.

== Demographics ==
As of 2001 India census, Paikmal had a population of 3,916. Male population was 2,027 and female population was 1,889, this is little low to compare with males population. Paikmal has a literacy rate about nearly 61%.

== Politics ==
MLA from Padmapur Assembly Constituency is Barsha Singh Bariha of BJD. The former MLA from Padampur Assembly Constituency was Pradeep Purohit of BJP from 2014 till 2018.

== School & College ==
1. Jawahar Navodaya Vidyalaya (JNV)
2. Odisha Adarsha Vidyalaya (OAV)
3. Mahamaya Public School
4. Sri Sri Nrusingha Nath Ayurved College and Research Institute
5. Vindhya Vasini Degree College
6. Paikmal High School
7. Yamunakandhuni Girls High School
8. Govt. Upper Primary School
9. Saraswati Sishu Vidya Mandir
10. Sri Aurobindo School
11. Govt. (SSD) High School, Nrusinghnath, Paikmal
