= Patora Dam =

Dam in Patora, Nuapada, Odisha, India

- Location within Odisha Location within India
- Official name: ପତୋରା ଡାମ୍
- Country: India
- Location: Patora, Nuapada district
- Coordinates: 20°43′06″N 82°27′44″E

Dam and spillways
- Impounds: Jonk River

Patora dam is located in Odisha. It is constructed across Jonk River in Patora village located 18 km from Nuapada in Nuapada district, Odisha in India.

== See also ==
- Brahmanpada, Nuapada
- Odisha
- Harishankar Temple
- Nrusinghanath Temple
- Nuapada
- Khariar Road
- Bolangir
- Western Odisha
- Bangomunda
