= Ambabhona =

- Location in Odisha, India Ambabhona (India)
- Coordinates: 21.5781°N 83.4753°E
- Country: India
- State: Odisha
- District: Bargarh

Languages
  - Official: (Koshali language)
- Time zone: UTC+5:30 (IST)

Ambabhona is a rural village in Bargarh district, Odisha. The 2011 India census shows Ambabhona to have a population of 1,746. A police station is located in the village. The Kedarnath Temple stands besides the Mahanadi river at Sambalpur, just south of the village. It was completed by 1765 during the Sambalpur State reign of Ajit Singh.

The following villages are included within Ambabhona panchayat:

Ambabhona, Budhipali, Gangai, Gurukhapali, Jharpali, Kandheipali, Khaprakhol, Kutharpali, Ludupali, Mundkati, Sambalpuri and Santhara.

Ambabhona is also the name of a sub-district which had a population of 65,715 at the 2011 census. The sub-district is classed as wholly rural. It has an area of 182.27 square kilometres (70.37 sq mi) and is made up of 15 panchayats covering 114 villages.
