= Nawapara Road railway station =

Railway station in Odisha, India

Nawapara Road

General information
- Location: Nuapada, Odisha; India
- Coordinates: 20°48′35″N 82°33′45″E
- System: Indian Railways station
- Owner: Ministry of Railways, Indian Railways
- Line: Raipur–Vizianagaram line
- Platforms: 2
- Tracks: 2

Construction
- Structure type: Standard (on ground)
- Parking: No

Other information
- Status: Functioning
- Station code: NPD
- Zone(s): East Coast Railway
- Division(s): Sambalpur
Location
- Location within India Location within Odisha

Nawapara Road railway station is a railway station on the East Coast Railway network in the state of Odisha, India. It serves Nawapara town. Its code is NPD. It has two platforms. Passenger, Express trains halt at Nawapara Road railway station.

== Major trains ==
- Durg–Jagdalpur Express
- Korba–Visakhapatnam Express
- Puri–Durg Express
- Bilaspur–Tirupati Express

== See also ==
- Nuapada district
