= Harishankar Temple =

Temple in Odisha, India

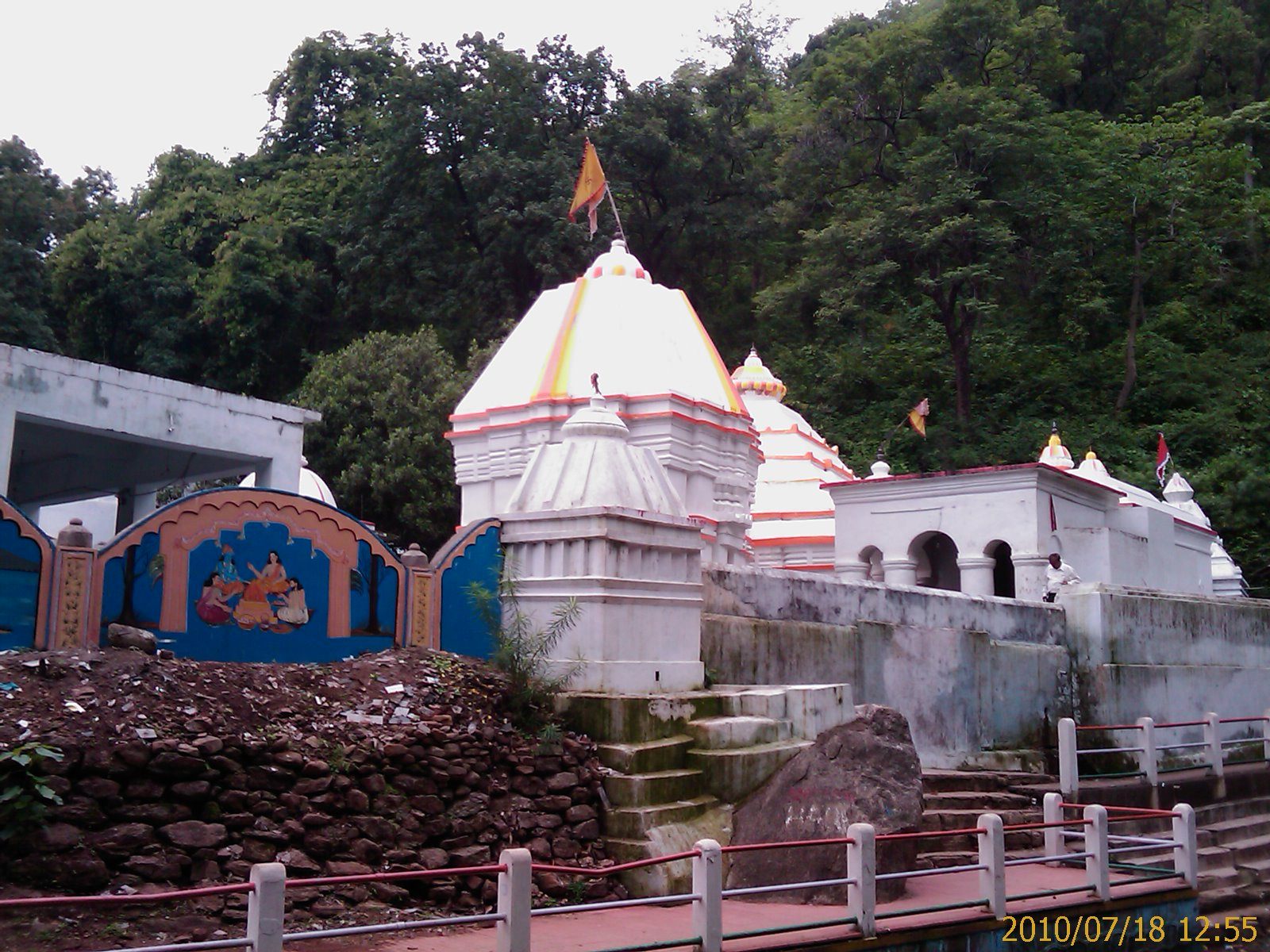
- Harishankar Temple, Balangir

- Location within Odisha

Religion
- Affiliation: Hinduism
- District: Balangir

Location
- Location: Harishankar
- State: Odisha
- Country: India
- Interactive map of Harishankar Temple
- Coordinates: 20.854406°N 82.860610°E

Architecture
- Type: Kalinga architecture

Sri Sri Harisankar Devasthana is a temple on the slopes of Gandhamardhan hills, Bolangir District of Odisha in India. It is popular for its scenes of nature and connection to two Hindu lords, Vishnu and Shiva. As a holy place, along with a stream passing on the granite bed, it has given some visitors a feeling of peace. On the opposite of side of the Gandhamardhan hills is the temple of Nrusinghanath. The plateau between the two temples has been found to have ancient Buddhist ruins, which are considered to be remnants of the ancient Parimalgiri University.

== History ==
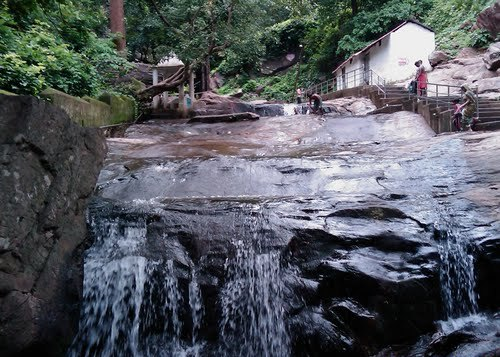
a stream at Harishankar Temple

The deity of Harisankar was discovered by a Chauhan dynasty king of Patna kingdom of Odisha, during the 14th century. From that time, the deity has been worshipped. A dancing Ganesha image has been found, which can be traced to the early 12th century. The temple was constructed by the order of then queen Durlabha Devi of Maharaja Vaijjal Dev Chauhan.

== Festivals ==
- All Ekadashi, Sankranti
- Shivratri
- Makar Sankranti
- Maagha Mela

== Location ==
It is located in the district of Balangir, Odisha. The nearest railway station is at Harishankar Road, only 32 km from the temple. Regular taxis are available to the temple from this railway station.

== See also ==
- Nrusinghanath Temple
- Patora Dam
- Kantabanji
- Bangomunda
- Harihara
