= Gaisilat =

Coordinates: 20°57′46″N 83°18′54″E

- Interactive map of Gaisilat
- Country: India
- State: Odisha
- District: Bargarh

Population
  - Total: 92,932
- Time zone: UTC+5:30 (Indian Standard Time)

Gaisilat or Gaisilet is a block in Bargarh District, Odisha, India. It has 19 Gram Panchayats.

== List of villages ==
There are 84 villages in Gaisilet.
