= Phalguna Mela =

Hindu festival

Phalguna Mela is a Hindu festival in Odisha associated with the temple of Khatushyam and Shyam Temple Bhatli. The festival occurs 8–9 days before Holi.

Barbarika's head appeared on Phalguna Shuddha Ekadashi, the 11th day of the bright half of the Hindu month of Phalguna. The fair was initially held from the 9th to the 12th of that month, later extended to nearly 12–15 days of the bright half of the Phalguna Month.

Pilgrims all over the country attend with nishaans (holy mark - flags) in their hands. People mark their holy journey by singing shyam bhajans and playing various musical instruments. They play holi with gulal. Many Shyam Bhaktas supply food to pedestrians in the shade of tents. On Dwadashi (the 12th day of the month), Bhog is prepared as Baba's Prasadi of Kheer and Churama.

Two famous Phalguna mela are from Khatushyam rajastan and Bhatli odisha.
