= Nrusinghanath Temple =

Hindu temple in Odisha

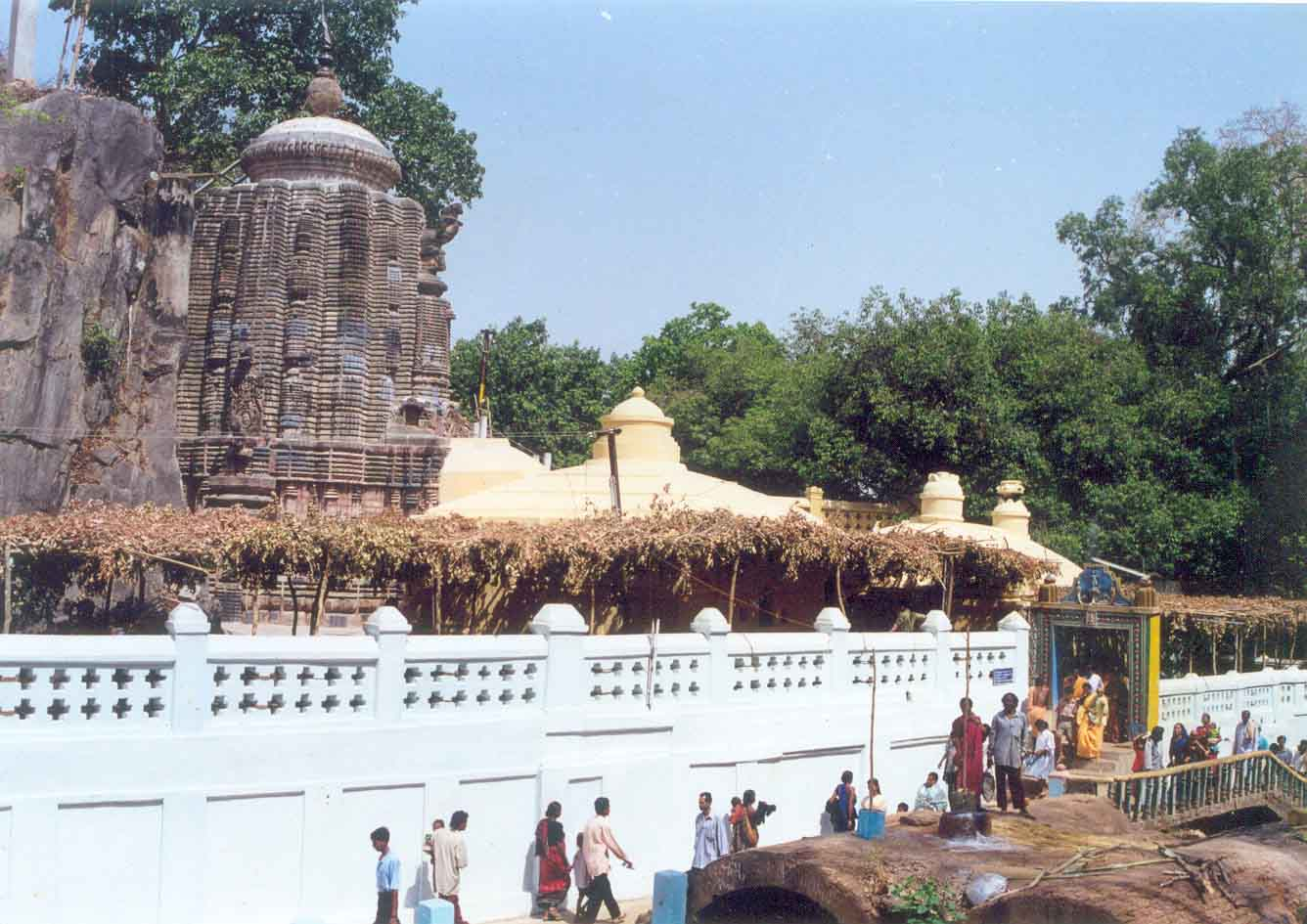
- Nrusinghanath Mandir

- Location in Odisha Nrusinghanath Temple (India)

Religion
- Affiliation: Hinduism
- District: Bargarh
- Deity: Narasimha

Location
- Location: Paikmal,Padmapur
- State: Odisha
- Country: India
- Coordinates: 20.895796°N 82.827939°E

Architecture
- Type: Kalinga Architecture
- Creator: Baijal Singh Dev
- Completed: 15th century CE

Website
- www.nrusinghanathtemple.in

Nrusinghanath Temple, is a Hindu temple in Western Odisha, India, situated at the foothills of Gandhamardhan hills near Paikmal, Bargarh. The King of Patna, Baijal Singh Dev laid the foundation of this historic temple in early 15th century CE. It is only 45 feet in height, divided into two parts: the first being the seat of the Lord Nrusinghnath, the second allotted to Jagamohan (antechamber having 3 gates and each supported by 4 pillars.

== History ==
Around six hundred years ago, a woman Jamuna Kandhuni as referred in the book "Nrusingha Charitra" in Odia language composed a Kavya that sings the glory of Marjara Keshari in regard to suppression and repression of torture and tyranny of Musika Daitya. According to the legend, when people were greatly afflicted by Musika Daitya (the incarnate Mouse Demon), Vishnu Mani in the appearance (incarnation) of Marjara Keshari, in His Feline Form, ran to eat the demonic mouse form – Musika Daitya who never came out from the tunnel and Marjara Keshari waited from that day. The temple is reputed from that day with this mythological history. This story is symbolic of grounding the demonic evil power of tyranny and torture that never dared to come out further and Lord Nrusinghnath alias Marjara Keshari has been guarding it since then. According to Huen Tsang, the Chinese traveler, this place was a centre of Buddhist scriptural learning. Lord Nrushinghanath is a much-adored deity of Odisha and a great fair is held in his honour on the 14th day of bright fortnight in the month of Vaisakha. According to Odia and Devnagari inscriptions, the temple was built by Baijal Dev in the early 15th century AD. The temple is a masterpiece of Kalinga Architecture of Deula style prevalent in the Odisha region of India.

== Tourism ==
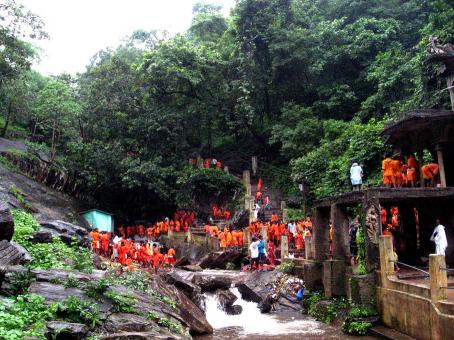
Step to Harishankar Temple

Here you can also visit Chal dhar (400 m from Temple), Bhim Dhar (425 m from Temple), Sita Kunda (500 m from Temple), Panchupandav (1.5 km from Temple), Kapil Dhar (4 km from Temple), Supta Dhar (7 km from Temple), Satyaamb (9 km from Temple), Bhim Madua (11 km from Temple), Happy Point (12 km from Temple). In recent year tourism has been developing in around Gandhamardhan hills. An annual big fair held on Nrusimha-chatrurdasi day during Vaishakha shukla chaturdashi (in May) attracts thousands of pilgrims from far and near. Nrusimhanath Temple is about 35 km west of Padampur,110 km west of Baragarh and 164 km from Sambalpur. Khariar Road Railway Station is the nearest railhead. Here also a beautiful garden created just near the temple, where Lord Krishna different avatar shown and also a 28 ft Hanuman Statue created inside the center of Garden.

== See also ==
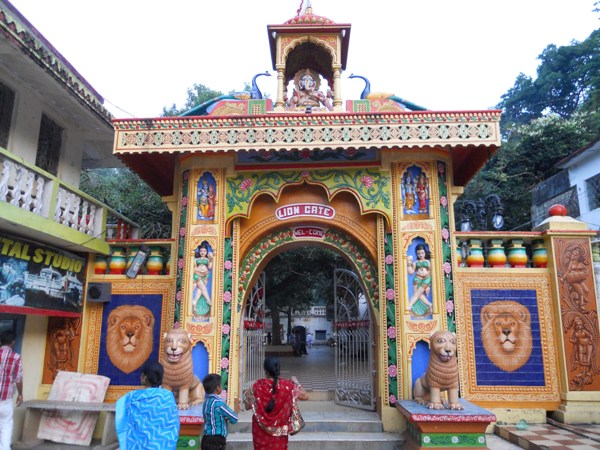
Gate of Nrusinghanath Temple

- Gandhamardhan hills
- Harishankar Temple
- Patora Dam
- Ranipur-Jharial
- Padmapur
- Bargarh
- Western Odisha
