= Padmapur =

Town in Odisha, India

Padmapur Rajborasambar
- Major Town
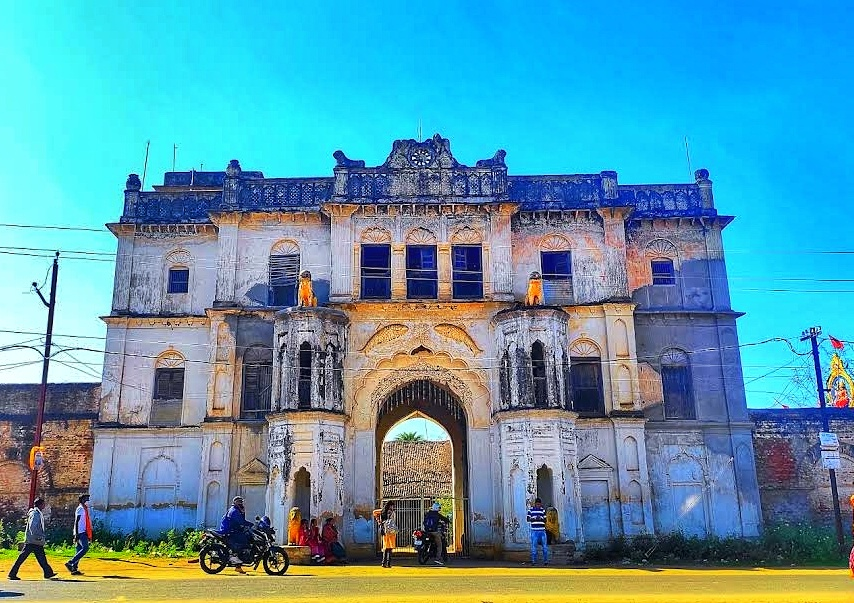
- Borasambar Palace, Padampur

- Location in Odisha, India Padmapur (India)
- Coordinates: 20°59′N 83°4′E
- Country: India
- State: Odisha
- District: Bargarh

Government
  - Type: Notified Area Council
  - Body: Padampur NAC
  - Member of Legislative Assembly: Barsha Singh Bariha, (BJD)
- Elevation: 205 m (673 ft)

Population (2011)
  - Total: 17,625

Languages
  - Official: Odia
  - Local: Sambalpuri
- Time zone: UTC+5:30 (IST)
- PIN: 768036
- Vehicle registration: OD-17

Padmapur or Padampur is a major town and a notified area in Bargarh district in the Indian state of Odisha. It is also a Subdivisional Headquarter and area wise biggest subdivision of Bargarh District.

== Geography ==
Padmapur is located at 20.59°N 83.40°E. It has an average elevation of 205 metres (673 ft). It is almost 80 kilometres (50 mi) from its district headquarters, Bargarh. It is about 420 kilometres (260 mi) from its capital city of Bhubaneshwar. Padmapur is also 80 kilometres (50 mi) from district headquarter of Balangir towards south. So, it forms a rough equilateral triangle Bargarh - Balangir - Padmapur. And 65 kilometres (40 mi) from Nuapada towards west. Towards North of the city around 20 kilometres (12 mi) there's the border of state Chhattisgarh.The City has the range of Gandhamardan Hills and forest nearby. The city sits on the bank of Ong River (one of the major tributary rivers of Mahanadi).

== Demographics ==
According to the 2011 Census of India, The city's population was 17,625, out of which 8,988 are males and 8,637 are females as per report. The population of children is 1,899 which is around 10.77% of total city's population. The Female sex ratio and child sex ratio 961 and 822 which compared to Odisha State Average 979 and 941 respectively. The city's literacy rate is 83.26% which is higher as compared to state average 72.87%. Male and Female literacy is 89.66% and 76.72% respectively.

== Politics ==
The Member of the Legislative Assembly from Padampur Assembly Constituency is Barsha Singh Bariha of BJD, who won the seat in General elections in 2024.

Padampur used to be part of Sambalpur (Lok Sabha constituency). Now, it comes under Bargarh Lok Sabha constituency, which is now represented by Pradeep Purohit BJP.

== Transportation ==
Padmapur is well connected with the major cities and towns of Odisha by road. Odisha's major expressway Biju Expressway passes through this city on Odisha's SH-3. The city is the end point of Chhattisgarh's SH-16.

=== Buses ===
Padmapur is one among the 23 bus depots of Odisha State Road Transport Corporation. And It is well connected to cities like Bhubaneswar, Cuttack, Sambalpur, Berhampur, Bargarh, Puri, Keonjhar, Balangir, Bhawanipatna, Jharsuguda, Sundargarh, Koraput, Sonepur and many more places with both Government and Private buses. It also has interstate bus service to Chhattisgarh's Raipur and Basna. OSRTC operates it's Premium Volvo 9600 from Padampur to Puri, Bhubaneswar.

=== Railways ===
There is no direct railway connectivity to Padmapur city. But the Indian Railways Ministry approved one of the most important projects i.e Bargarh Road railway station to Nawapara Road railway station via Padmapur in 2024. The railway had already sanctioned ₹2621.96 crore to complete this within upcoming 5 years.

Currently the nearest railway stations are: Bargarh Road railway station - 80 kilometres (50 mi) Balangir Junction railway station - 80 kilometres (50 mi) Kantabanji railway station -80 kilometres (50 mi) Nawapara Road railway station - 65 kilometres (40 mi) Khariar Road railway station - 77 kilometres (48 mi)

=== Airways ===
Currently the nearest Airport to Padmapur are: Veer Surendra Sai Airport - 168 kilometres (104 mi) Swami Vivekananda Airport - 172 kilometres (107 mi) Biju Patnaik Airport - 400 kilometres (250 mi)

The Padmapur city has an airstrip Satibhata Airstrip. It can serve for small Light aircraft and yet to be progress under UDAN scheme in the future.
