= Barbarika =

Hindu deity

Khatu Shyam Ji (Shyam Baba)
- God of Kaliyug
- Other names: Barbareek , Khatu Naresh, Morvinandan, Lakhdatar, Hare Ka Sahara
- Mantra: || Om Shri Morvinandanay Namah ||
- Artifacts: Born In Kullu Manali (Hidimb Van)
- Symbols: Bow With Three Arrow
- Texts: Hare Ka Sahara Baba Shyam Humara | Teenbaan Dhaari | Lakhdaatar
- Festivals: Faalgun Ekadashi & Dwadashi Also Kaartik Ekadashi and Dwadashi

Genealogy
- Born: Barbareek
- Parents: Ghatotkacha (Father), Kaamktankta or Maurvi (Mother)

Barbareek (Barbarīka) in Hinduism is the son of Ghatotkacha and Princess Maurvi or KaamKtankta (Daughter of Daitya Moor). Ghatotkach is the son of Bhima and Hidimba. Maurvi is the daughter of Daitya Moor (King of Pragjyotishpur (Assam)). Barbareek is a folk hero and is not attested in the Mahabharata.

In Nepal, Kirati king Yalambar is believed to be the Barbarik of Mahabharata, son of Ghatotkach and grandson of Bheem. Legend credits him with meeting Indra, the lord of heaven, who ventured into the Valley in human guise, while natives of the Kathmandu Valley portray him as Akash Bhairav.

In Rajasthan, Barbareek is worshipped as Khatu Shyam in Khatu Shyam Temple, and in Gujarat, he is worshipped as Baliyadev.

== Legendary arrows ==
Barbareek was a grandson of Bhima (second of the Pandava brothers), and the son of Ghatotkacha. Ghatotkach was the son of Bhima and Hidimba. He learnt the art of warfare from his mother Kaamktankta, who was also known as Maurvi (daughter of King Moor). The goddess Durga gave him the three infallible arrows.

== See also ==
- Iravan
