= Gandhamardan Hills =

Hill in Odiasha, India

Gandhamardan Mountains
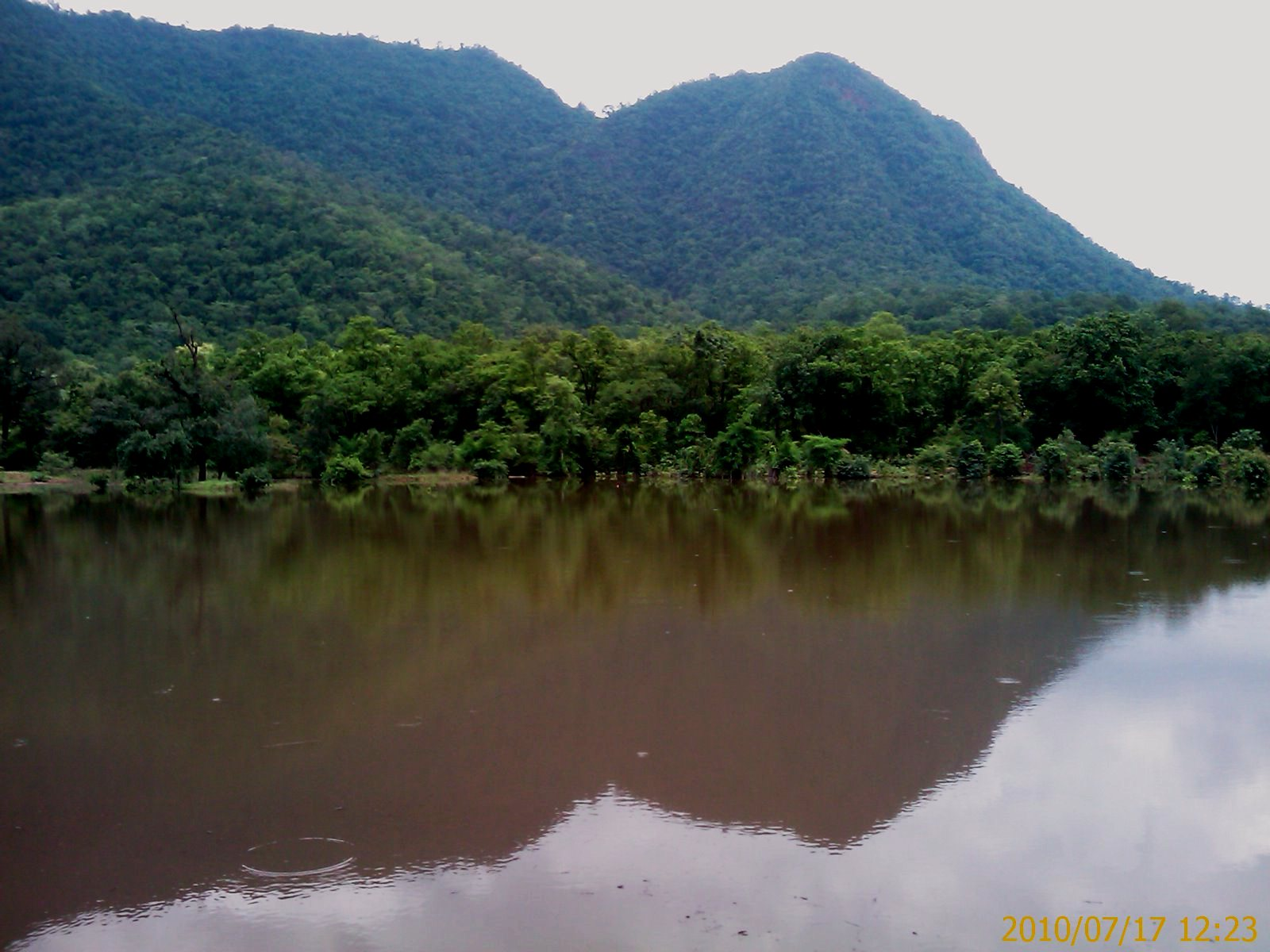
- Western part of the Gandhamardan Mountains as visible from Paikmal Side.

Highest point
- Elevation: 1060
- Coordinates: 20°52′26″N 82°50′34″E

Geography
- Location within Odisha
- Location: Bargarh District, Odisha, India
- Parent range: Gandhamardan Mountains

Climbing
- Easiest route: Drive, Trekking

Gandhamardan Hills or Gandhamardan Parbat 1060m(Odia: ଗନ୍ଧମାର୍ଦନ ପର୍ବତ) is a hill located in between Balangir and Bargarh district of Odisha, India. This hill is well known for medicinal plants. There is a Bauxite reserve which is planned for exploration by the state government through a private venture. Lord Parshuram is believed to reside here.

== Theology ==
According to Hinduism, Lord Hanuman carried this hill on his shoulders from Himalayas to save the life of Lakshman. In the Treta Yug, Sushena (the expert physician from Lanka who was chief of medicines, Shri Hanumana requested him and carried him with his entire palace to the place where Shri Laxmana was lying injured) had suggested Vir Hanuman to bring Bisalyakarani ere dawn, so that Laxman would rise back to life. It was in the middle of the war between Lord Ram and Ravan. Hanuman failed to identify the particular herb and carried on his shoulders a huge Himalayan mass. While flying above and proceeding toward Lanka (the kingdom of Ravan), a portion dropped down. Gandhamardan is synonymous to that portion only. At the northern slope of this hill the Nrusinghanath Temple is located; whereas on the southern slope of this hill is the famous Harishankar Temple.

== History ==
Sage Drona residing on this mountain belonging to the Mahabharat period used to deliver art of weaponry to the selected few pupils and he was famous for it across the country. The pupils educated and trained in the art of warfare were feared by many warriors of that time.

Many scholars believe that this mountain (and not Nagarjunakonda) was the site of the monastery of Nagarjuna, which Hiuen-Tsiang referred to as Po-lo-mo-lo-ki-li (restored to "Paramalagiri" by Julien). Parimalagiri is identified with Gandhagiri (Gandhamardan hill) because the hill resembles a great extent to the description left by Hiuen-Tsiang, and also presents traces of a huge monastic establishment of the past.

== Bio-diversity ==
The Gandhamardan mountain ranges are a rich source of diversity for medicinal plants. The Botanical Survey of India has reported the existence of 220 plant species of medicinal value. Local people, however, claim that there are more than 500 species of medicinal plants in this area. The flora of the buffer zone is most vulnerable. Many medicinal plant species such as Clerodendron indicum, Rauvolfia serpentina and Plumbago zeylanica, which were once available in plenty, have become scarce. A study recorded 2,700 angiosperms and 125 species of important medicinal plants, out of a total of 220 species of medicinal and quasi-medicinal and economically vital plants.

Such is its richness in medicinal plants that more than 100 traditional healthcare practitioners live in and around the Gandhamardan hills. These practitioners provide medical facilities to about 50,000 tribal people. There are two Ayurvedic colleges and hospitals on both side of Gandhamardan — one in Bargarh district and the other in Balangir.

Local people have great faith in Ayurvedic practitioners and in many villages, their main occupation is to collect herbs and supply them to companies such as Dabur and Zandu. Some of these villages include Khandijharan, Manbhang, Magurmal and Cherenga jhanj. A study conducted by M Brahma and H O Saxena of the Regional Research Laboratory recorded the medicinal uses of nearly 200 species, out of which they found the uses of 77 to be new or "interesting'.

The local communities and the peoples movement in Gandhamardhan hills have been largely responsible for preserving the rich biodiversity of the region. This community has protected their land, forests and resources from being plundered by corporate vested interests. The movement has been a source of inspiration for various struggles across Odisha.
