= Bargarh district =

- District
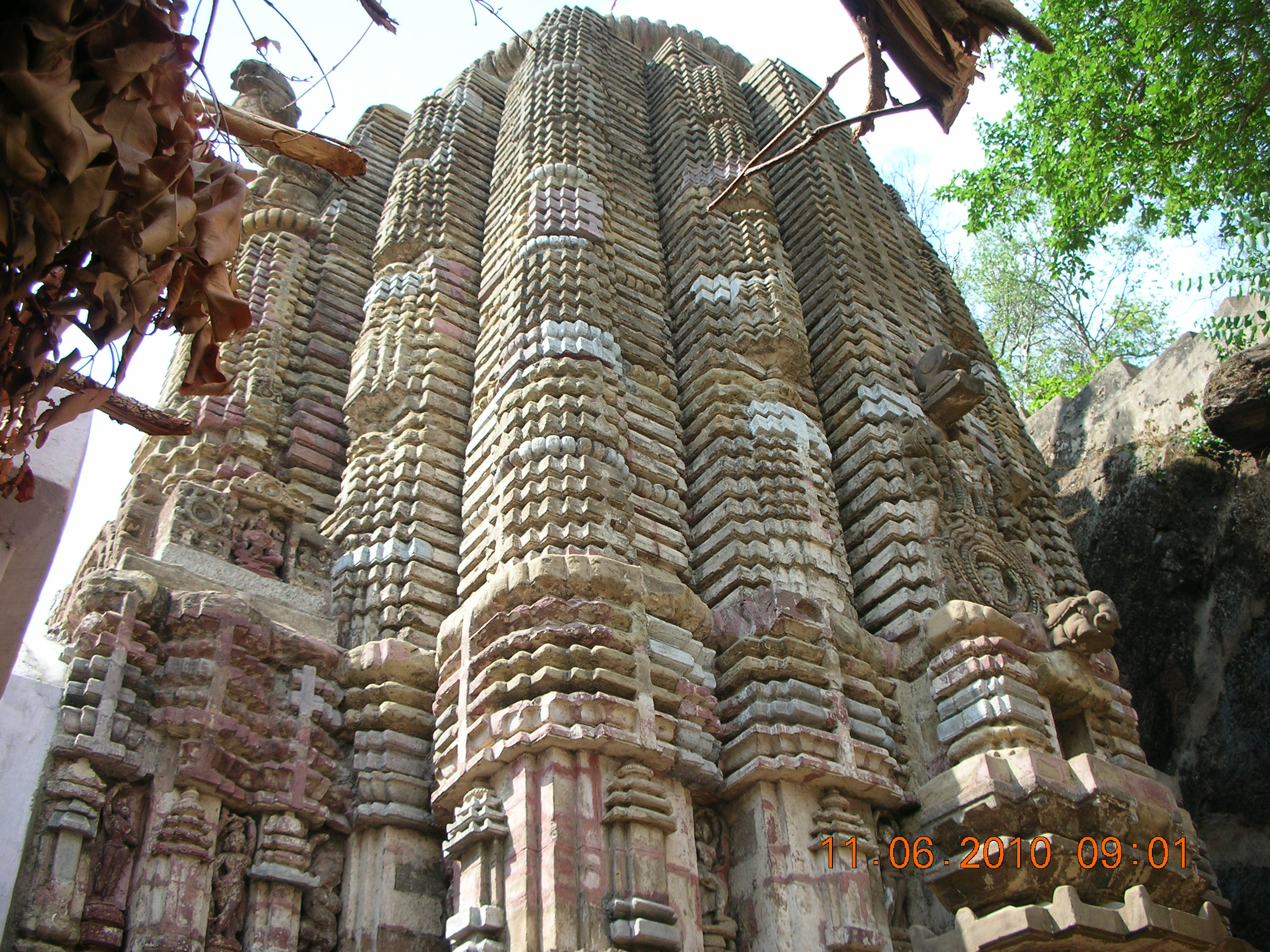
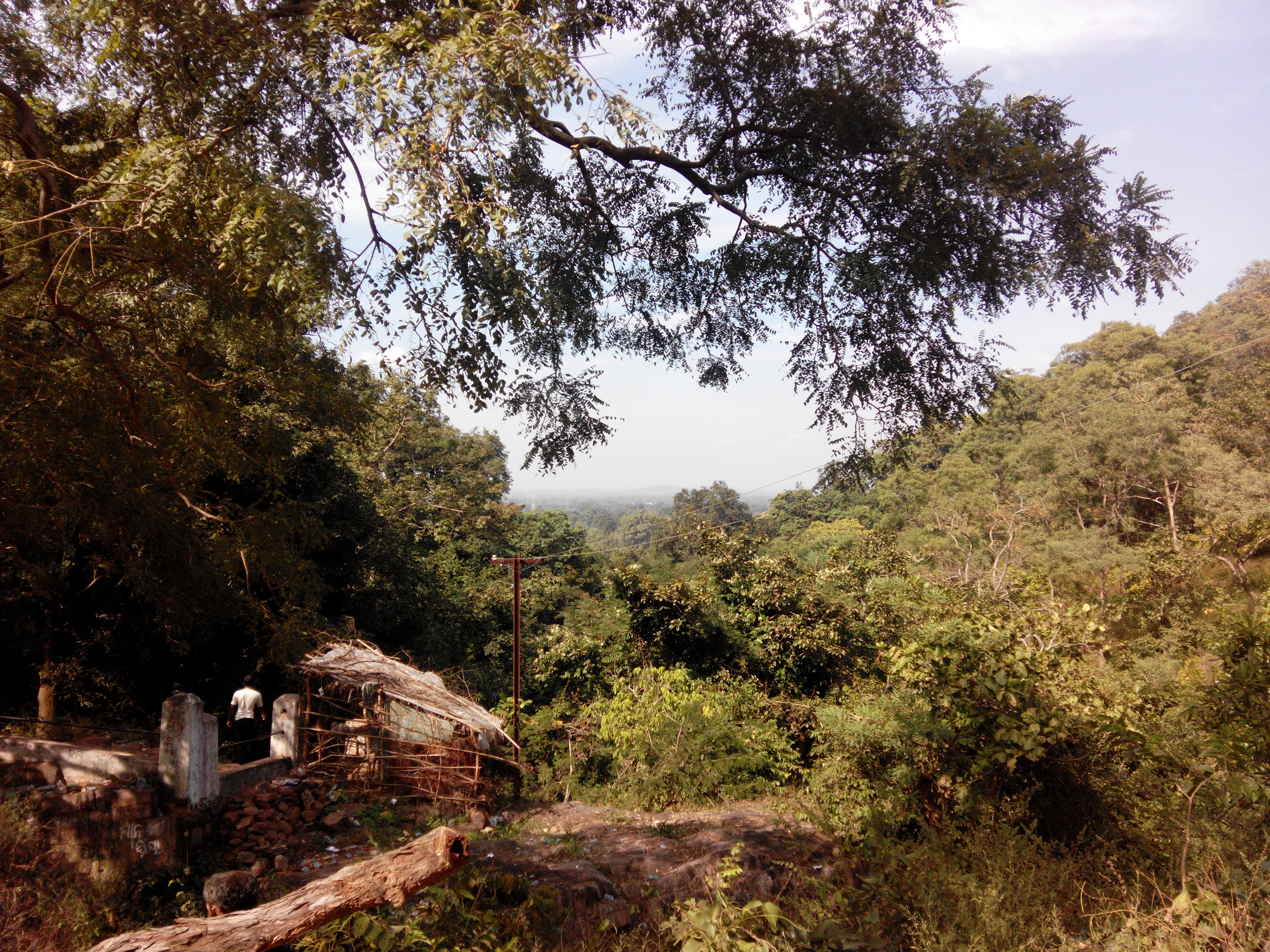
- Top: Nrusinghanath Temple near Paikmal; Bottom: Gandhamardan Hills
- Interactive map of Bargarh district
- Coordinates: 21.333°N 83.616°E
- Country: India
- State: Odisha
- Headquarters: Bargarh

Government
  - Collector and District Magistrate: Aditya Goyal, IAS
  - Divisional Forest Officer Cum Wildlife Warden: Saroj Kumar Panda, OFS
  - Superintendent of Police: Rabindra Nath Satpathy, OPS(SAG)

Area
  - Total: 5,837 km^{2} (2,254 sq mi)

Population (2011)
  - Total: 1,481,255
  - Rank: 13
  - Density: 253/km^{2} (660/sq mi)

Languages
  - Official: Odia, English
  - Spoken: Sambalpuri
- Time zone: UTC+5:30 (IST)
- PIN: 768 028
- Telephone code: 6683, 6684, 6685,0 6646
- Vehicle registration: OD-17
- Sex ratio: 976 ♂/♀
- Literacy: 75.16%
- Lok Sabha constituency: Bargarh
- Vidhan Sabha constituency: 5: 001-Padampur 002-Bijepur 003-Bargarh 004-Attabira(SC) 005-Bhatli
- Climate: Aw (Köppen)
- Precipitation: 1,527 millimetres (60.1 in)
- Avg. summer temperature: 46 °C (115 °F)
- Avg. winter temperature: 10 °C (50 °F)
- Website: www.bargarh.nic.in

Bargarh district is an administrative district of Odisha state in eastern India. The city of Bargarh is its district headquarters. The district was carved out of the erstwhile district of Sambalpur on 1 April 1993.

== History ==
In ancient times, Bargarh was part of Dakshina Kosala, along with large parts of western Odisha and the plains of Chhattisgarh. The region was most likely in the pre-Maghadan empire of Mahapadmananda. However, there is no mention of the territory in Mauryan inscriptions, so it is unknown whether the Mauryans controlled Dakshina Kosala. After the collapse of the Mauryan empire, Dakshina Kosala became ruled by the Chedis. It was from Dakshina Kosala that Kharavela's ancestors came to Kalinga. Dakshina Kosala was most likely part of Kharavela's empire. After Kharevala, the Megha dynasty ruled the region. In the 4th century CE, the Allahabad inscription records Samudra Gupta defeated Mahendra of Kosala, corresponding roughly to present day Chhattisgarh plains and western Odisha. Although not annexed to the Gupta empire, Kosala remained within Gupta spheres of influence evidenced by presence of Gupta coins in the region.

In the 6th century, the Sarabhpuriyas from Sarabha (now identified as Sirpur in present-day Chhattisgarh) came to prominence. Their territory included present-day Bargarh district, as well as parts of Kalahandi. They were succeeded by the Panduvamshis, whose king, Tivaradeva, tried to expand east of Kosala into Utkala, now coastal Odisha. Although he failed, he kept control of Kosala including Bargarh. In the last decades of the 9th century, the Somavamshis ruled over present-day Kosala. Janamejaya I expanded his domain south and east, and defeated the Kalachuris. His son Yayati was blocked by the Kalachuris when attempting to expand into the north and west of Kosala, but Bargarh was in his realm. The Somavamshis were defeated during Rajendra Chola's northern expedition. In the chaos that followed, Yayati II stabilized the kingdom, which corresponded to modern Odisha. His son beat off Kalachuri invasions during his reign, but the kingdom soon collapsed. Kosala fell into Telugu Choda hands, who had aided a rival king who defeated the Somvamshis. The Telugu Cholas were soon driven out by the Kalachuris. A branch of the Rashtrakutas became rulers of Bargarh and were vassals of the Kalachuris. During Kalachuri reign was issued a copper plate, c. 1131, that mentions the town Vagharakotta which some scholars associate with Bargarh. The Kalachuris soon began a long struggle with the Gangas of Utkala, which ended 100 years after when the Gangas drove the Kalachuris out around 1211.

However the Gangas soon became embroiled in struggles elsewhere, and the region was conquered by the Chauhan Rajputs of Patna. In the later part of the 16th century, the Samblapur Chauhans became independent. It was during this time that temple construction reached its height. The Chauhans continued ruling independently until the mid 18th century. The rulers then were weak, and real power rested in the diwans. Akbar Ray was the most powerful of these diwans. Ray soon took Sambalpur by force, and antagonised the Marathas. However he was soon overthrown by Jayant Singh in 1781. However, the state faced constant attack by the Marathas of Nagpur, who attempted to subdue the kingdom by force. Eventually, in 1800, they conquered the kingdom and placed a governor there and imprisoned the Chauhans in Chandrapur. During the Second Anglo-Maratha War in 1804, Sambalpur fell into British hands. However these territories were returned to the Marathas in 1806. After the Third Anglo-Maratha war in 1817, Sambalpur officially became British territory and the Chauhans were restored to the throne. However they lacked the former authority over their feudal lords which they had before.

In 1827, the king Maharaja Sai died and his widow was placed on the throne. Incensed by the breach of custom of letting a woman rule, many of the Gond and Binjhal landlords, threatened by caste Hindu favourites of the rani, supported a rival claimant Surendra Sai. The insurgency lasted for a long time until British troops defeated the insurgents. The British then deposed the rani and placed a distant descendant on the throne. In 1849, he died without a male heir, and the British annexed the state under the Doctrine of Lapse.

During the 1857 rebellion, mutineers stationed in Sambalpur broke Surendra Sai and his companions, including Madho Singh out of jail, and they soon raised an army against the British. While initially he simply wanted his and his brother's sentences commuted, when the British proposed harsher punishments and began closely guarding him, he escaped to where his brother had gathered 2000 men. Many of the principal zamindars were mustering their paiks against the British. However, the British came down with troops from Nagpur, the Madras Presidency and Chota Nagpur. They defeated the insurgents in open country and by February 1858 had taken back most of the district, but the insurgents were able to use the dense jungles and difficult terrain to their advantage. By 1861, the British adopted a more conciliatory approach to surrendering rebels, and finally in 1862 Surendra Sai surrendered. However the insurgency still continued and in 1864, Surendra Sai was arrested and his brothers too. They were all put in prison, where they died. Today Veer Surendra Sai and his rebels are honoured as freedom fighters.

The region saw the Odia Language Movement in 1891 and contributed to the freedom struggle. Many freedom fighters came from here.

Bargarh was formerly part of Sambalpur district but was separated out in 1993.

== Geography ==
Bargarh district lies in the western part of Odisha bordering Chhattisgarh. It borders Mahasamund and Raigarh districts of Chhattisgarh on the northwest, Jharsuguda district to the north, Sambalpur district to the east, Subarnapur and Balangir districts to the south and Nuapada district to the west.

Bargarh is mainly open plain, with several small hill ranges.

== Administrative setup ==
The 12 Tahasils in Bargarh district under two sub-divisions are listed in the following table.

12 Tahasils
#	Bargarh Sub-Division	Padampur Sub-Division
1	Bargarh	Padampur
2	Ambabhona	Bijepur
3	Attabira	Gaisilat
4	Barpali	Jharbandh
5	Bhatli	Paikmal
6	Bheden	Sohela

The 12 Blocks in Bargarh district under two sub-divisions are listed in the following table.

12 Blocks
#	Bargarh Sub-Division	Padampur Sub-Division
1	Bargarh	Rajborasambar
2	Ambabhona	Bijepur
3	Attabira	Gaisilat
4	Barpali	Jharbandh
5	Bhatli	Paikmal
6	Bheden	Sohela

== Demographics ==
Historical population
Year	Pop.	±% p.a.
1901	371,066	—
1911	429,684	+1.48%
1921	449,182	+0.44%
1931	501,975	+1.12%
1941	565,389	+1.20%
1951	612,037	+0.80%
1961	693,122	+1.25%
1971	839,622	+1.94%
1981	1,032,354	+2.09%
1991	1,207,172	+1.58%
2001	1,346,336	+1.10%
2011	1,481,255	+0.96%

Religions in Bargarh district (2011)
Religion	Percent
Hinduism	98.50%
Christianity	0.79%
Islam	0.51%
Other or not stated	0.20%

According to the 2011 census Bargarh district has a population of 1,481,255, roughly equal to the nation of Gabon or the US state of Hawaii. This gives it a ranking of 339th in India (out of a total of 640). The district has a population density of 253 inhabitants per square kilometre (660/sq mi). Its population growth rate over the decade 2001-2011 was 9.84%. Bargarh has a sex ratio of 977 females for every 1000 males, and a literacy rate of 75.16%. 10.13% of the population lives in urban areas. Scheduled Castes and Scheduled Tribes make up 20.17% and 18.98% of the population respectively.

Languages of Bargarh district (2011 census)
1. Sambalpuri (76.2%)
2. Odia (17.4%)
3. Chhattisgadi (2.66%)
4. Hindi (1.51%)
5. Others (2.25%)

At the time of the 2011 Census of India, 76.22% of the population spoke Sambalpuri, 17.36% Odia, 2.66% Chhattisgarhi and 1.51% Hindi as their first language.

== Economy ==
All-season irrigation from Hirakud dam on the Mahanadi makes the northern half of Bargarh District rich in agriculture, mostly paddy.
