= Deobahal =

Deobahal Debabahal
- Village
- Nickname: Debahal
- Location in Odisha, India Deobahal (India)
- Coordinates: 20°13′N 82°25′E
- Country: India
- State: Odisha
- District: Nuapada

Government
  - Type: Panchayat
  - Body: Sanmaheswar Panchayat

Area
  - Total: 3 km^{2} (1.2 sq mi)

Population (2011)
  - Total: 603
  - Density: 200/km^{2} (520/sq mi)

Languages
  - Official: Odia
  - Spoken: Sambalpuri
- Time zone: UTC+5:30 (IST)
- PIN: 766107
- Telephone code: 06671
- Vehicle registration: OD-26
- Sex ratio: 1000:920 male/female
- Website: odisha.gov.in

Deobahal, also known as Debahal and Debabahal, is a village situated in Nuapada District (Khariar Block), Odisha, India. The word Deobahal consists of two parts, Deo, which means "Deva" or "God", and Bahal, which means "land". Thus the actual meaning of Deobahal is "God's land".

Deobahal is situated at NH-353 which connects Raipur, Chhattisgarh and Berhampur, Odisha. The village can be reachable by bus from major towns like Khariar (10 km), Bargaon, Odisha 2(Km), Komna (17 km), Udyanbandh (22 km), Nuapada (55 km), Khariar Road (65 km), Bhawanipatna (85 km) and Bolangir (120 km). The nearby railway stations are Kantabanji (45 km), Nuapada (55 km), and Khariar Road (65 km). And the nearest airport is at Raipur, Chhattisgarh which is 180 km from Deobahal.

== Places of interest ==
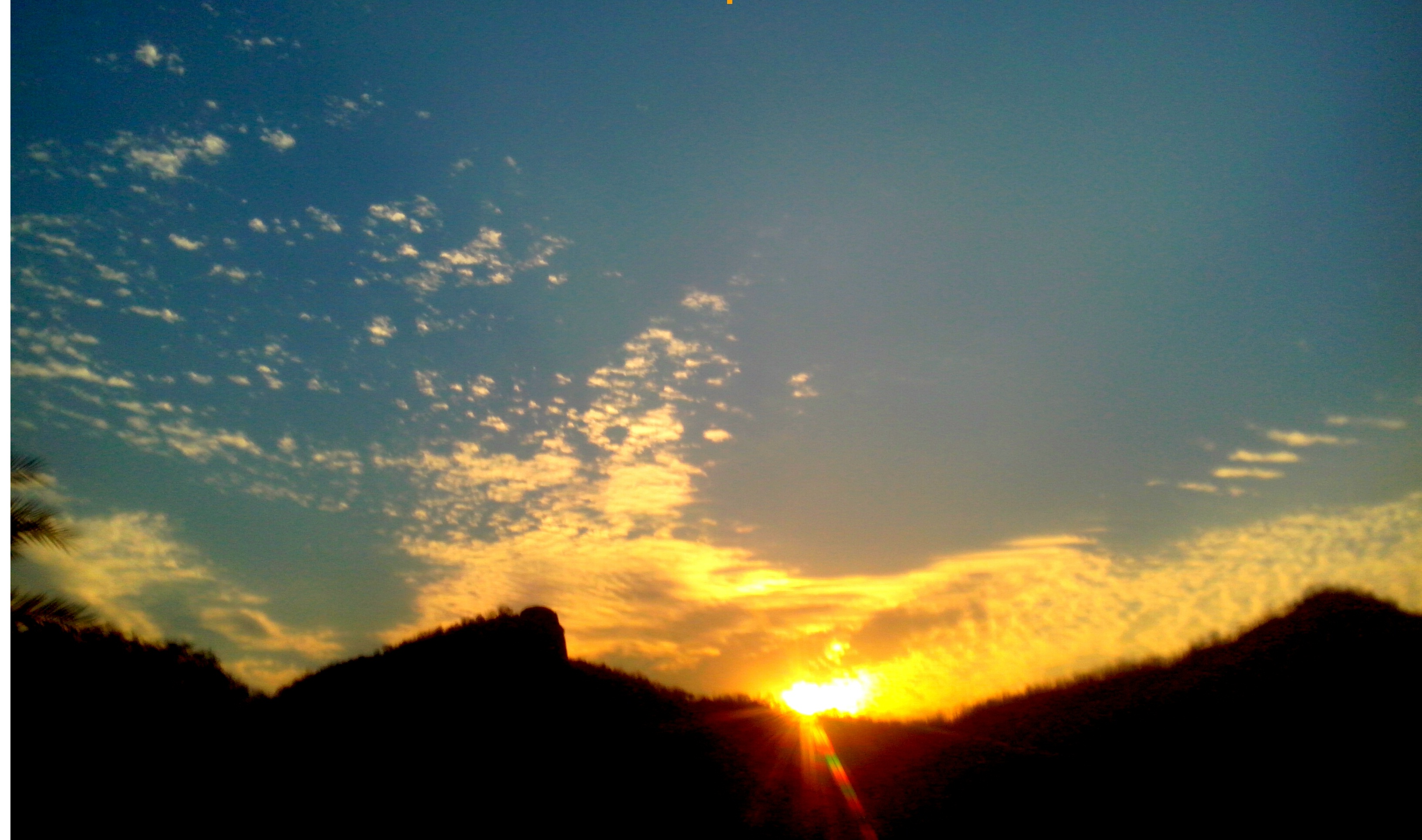
A scenic view of Budharaja, Deobahal

Budharaja is a forest. Thongo Pakhaan is at the hill top. Thongo Pakhaan is a rock cave with a height of about 100 ft and a radius around 50 ft. Pradhaani Pathar is a large parallel surface. Makar Chuaan is a small stream.

Chaka Dongor is another forest where NH 353 gone through. A temple is there called Chaka Dongren Gudi, where Maa Chaka Dongren is worshipped.

Tikhali Dam, 3 km from Deobahal, is a major tourist attraction. Places to visit include Baba Jaleswar Temple, dam site, parks and gardens.

== Education ==
=== Nursery education ===
There is an Anganwadi Kendra for children 3–5 years old.

=== Primary education ===
Primary School, Deobahal is the only school in Deobahal. It was established in 1958 and the school management is the Department of Education. It is an Odia medium, co-educational school.

=== Middle and higher secondary education ===
The students depend on Sanmaheswar (1 km) and Bargaon, Odisha (2 km) villages for class 6th to 10th.

=== Colleges ===
- Khariar Junior College (8 km)
- Khariar Autonomous College (8 km)
- Women's College, Khariar (11 km)
- LCAT, Khariar (10 km)
- Parikhit Tiger Junior College, Khariar (9 km)
- Mahatma Gandhi Junior College, Chindaguda (13 km)
- Junior College, Komna (18 km)
- Degree College, Komna (18 km)
- Junior College, Boden (25 km)
- Biju Pattnaik Degree College, Boden (25 km)

== Overview ==
=== As per 2011 Census ===
Particulars	Total	Male	Female
Number of households	136		
Total population	603	314	289
Total children (0–6)	98	52	46
Total SC population	128	66	62
Total ST population	278	144	134
Total literate population	73.27%	88.55%	56.79%
Worker population	217	171	46
Main worker population	163		
Marginal workers	54		
Females per 1000 males	920		

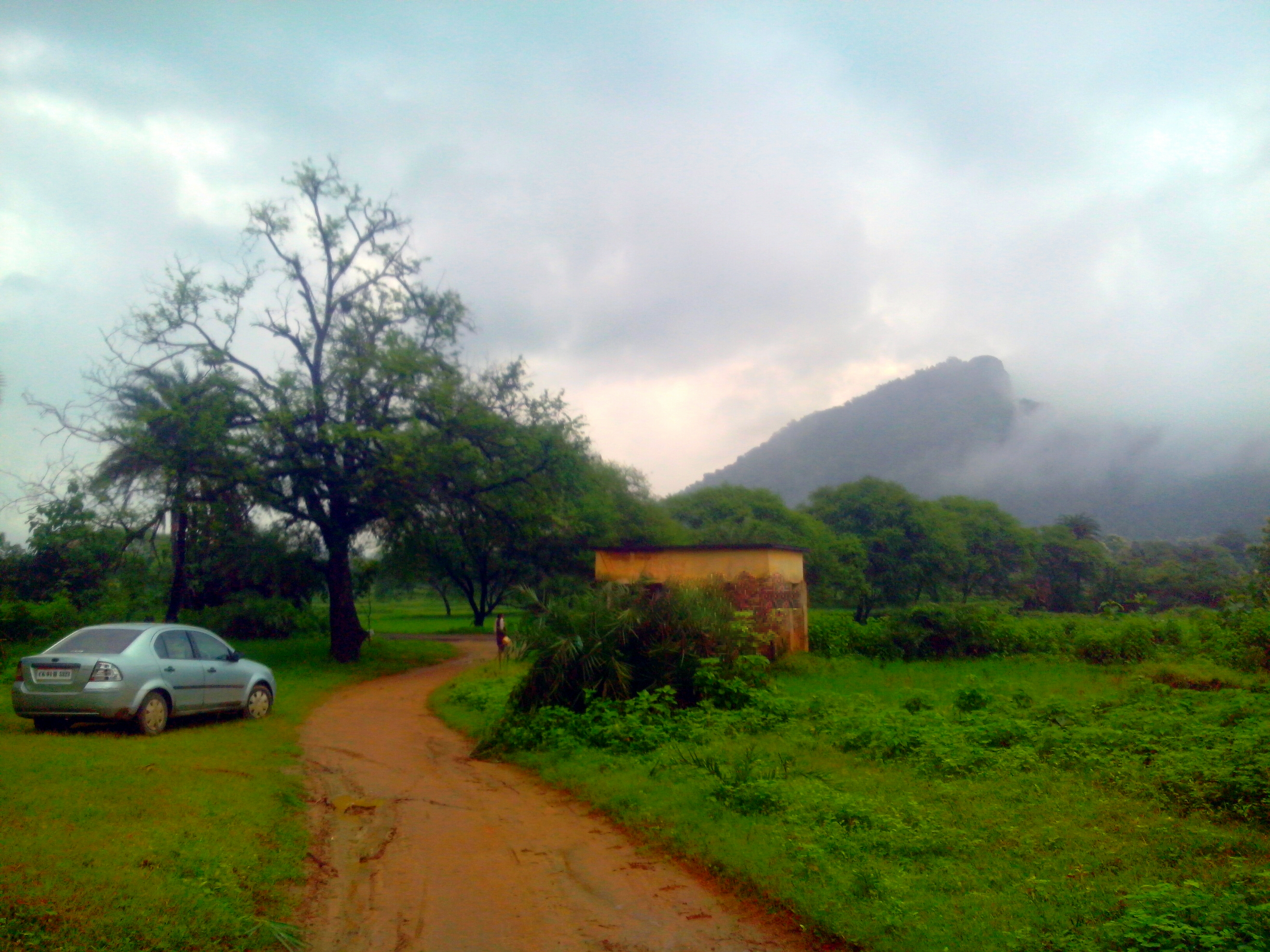
Bus stand, Deobahal

Deobahal is a small village with a total of 136 families residing. Deobahal village has a population of 603, 314 of whom are males while 289 are females as per the Population Census of 2011. The population of children aged 0–6 is 98 which makes up 16.25% of the total population of the village. The average sex ratio of Debahal village is 920 which is lower than the Odisha state average of 979. The child sex ratio for the Deobahal as per census is 885, lower than Odisha average of 941. Debahal village has a higher literacy rate than Odisha. In 2011, the literacy rate of Deobahal village was 73.27% compared to 72.87% of Odisha. In Deobahal male literacy stoof at 88.55% while the female literacy rate was 56.79%. As per the constitution of India and Panchyati Raaj Act, Deobahal village is administrated by Sarpanch (Head of Panchayat) with Ward Member who is the elected representative of the village.

=== Caste factor ===
In Debahal village, most of the population is from Schedule Tribe (ST). ST constitutes 46.10% while Schedule Caste (SC) were 21.23% of the total population.

=== Work profile ===
In Deobahal village out of the total population, 217 were engaged in work activities. 75.12% of workers described their work as main work (employment or earning for more than six months) while 24.88% were involved in marginal activity providing livelihood for less than six months. Of the 217 workers engaged in main work, 60 were cultivators (owner or co-owner) while 89 were agricultural labourers.

=== Gods and goddesses ===
- Chaka Dongren
- Gangadi
- Budharaja
