= Lower Indra Dam =

Dam on the Indra River in Odisha, India

Lower Indra Dam (Tikhali Dam)
- Location within Odisha Location within India
- Country: India
- Location: Nuapada, Odisha
- Coordinates: 20.39°N 82.66°E
- Construction began: 1997
- Opening date: 2019
- Construction cost: 1,624.49 Cr INR

Tikhali Dam is a major irrigation project of the Government of Odisha, and part of the Lower Indra Irrigation Project. The dam is located on the Indra River, a tributary of the Tel River, near the village of Dargoan, in Khariar block of Nuapada district. The areas affected are located in Balangir, and Nuapada districts. Construction began in 1997 and was completed in 2019 at a cost of 1624.49 Cr INR Scheduled date of Completion was March 2004 but Completed on 3 December 2019. The project costs escalated 10 times due to the delay.

== Objectives of the Dam ==
In order to improve the socioeconomic condition of the inhabitants of KBK areas and to irradiate frequent draught situation, Government of Odisha proposed to construct Lower Indra Dam.

By the completion of the project, irrigation facility will be provided to total ayacut area of 29,900 hectares in Khariar and Boden Block of Nuapada district and Bangomunda, Muribahal and Titlagarh blocks of Balangir district.

== How to reach ==
Lower Indra Dam is located at NH353 which connects Raipur, Mahasamund, Khariar Road, Nuapada, Khariar, Bhawanipatna .

The nearby railway station are Kantabanji railway station (50 km), Nuapada (58 km), Khariar Road (65 km).

The nearest airport is Swami Vivekananda Airport, Raipur.
