= Agalpur =

Agalpur (Raj)
- town
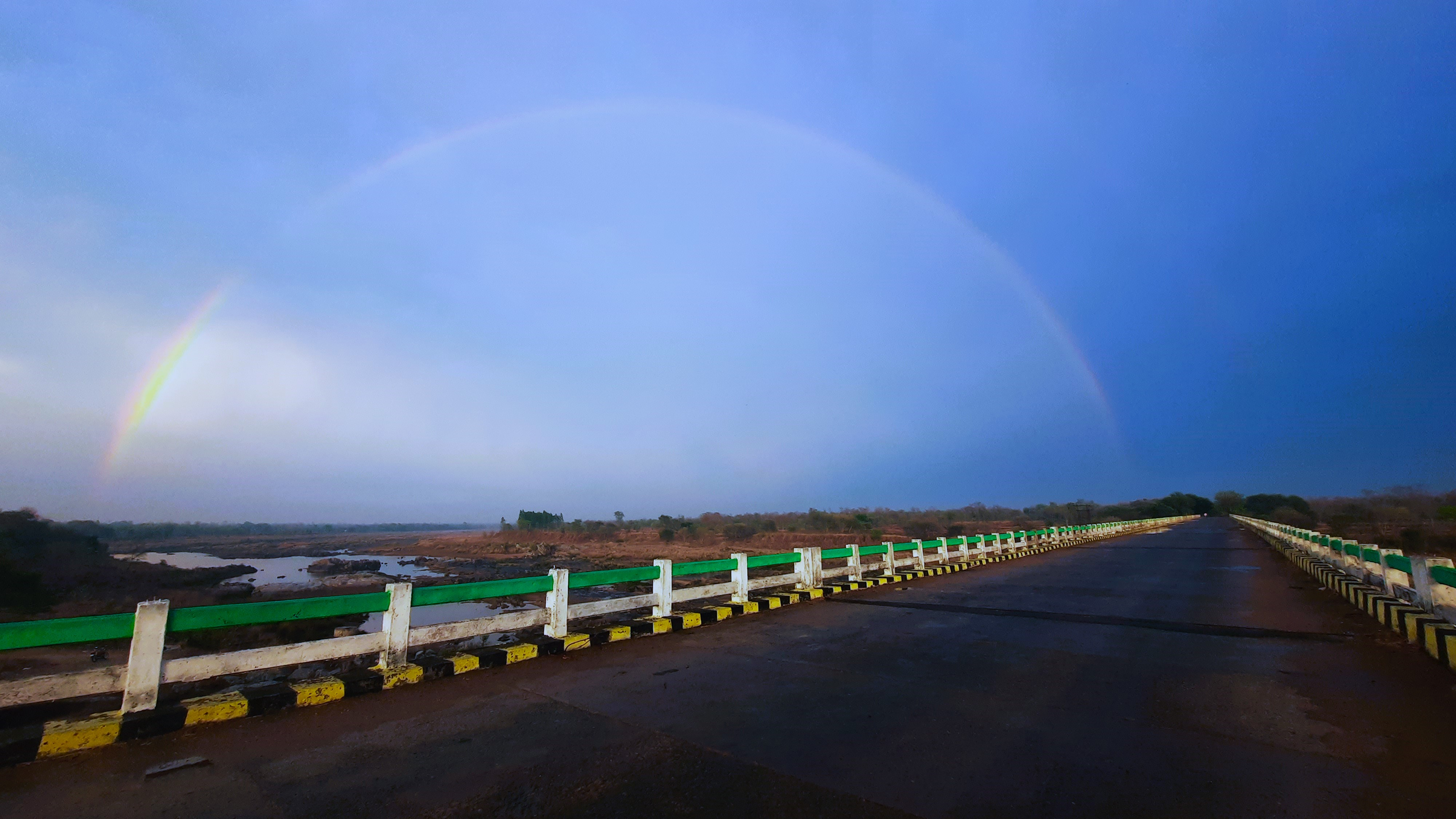
- Beautiful Agalpur bridge with rainbow on Ang river

- Location in Odisha, India Agalpur (Raj) (India)
- Coordinates: 21°0′42.36″N 83°24′26.85″E
- Country: India
- State: Odisha
- District: Balangir

Population (2011 Census)
  - Total: 4,234

Languages
  - Official: Odia
  - Local: Sambalpuri
- Time zone: UTC+5:30 (IST)
- PIN: 767022
- Telephone code: 06653
- Vehicle registration: OD-03
- Lok Sabha constituency: Balangir
- Vidhan Sabha constituency: Loisingha
- Climate: Tropical monsoon
- Website: odisha.gov.in

Agalpur is a town and Block in Balangir district in the state of Odisha, India. Agalpur (Raj) a historical place and a very old human community centre. It is situated in the triangular land of "Ang" river (also Known as "Ong" river);and Two Small Rivers (in Sambalpuri language known as "Joor") "Uttali"& "Ghesali". On the extreme north, after crossing the Ong river at about 10–20 km a beautiful hill is situated known as 'Chhelia Pahad".

== History ==
The village name of Agalpur (Raj) is believed to be very old and traditional. There are several stories behind the name of Agalpur (Raj). However, when asked to the former Sarpanch (of Agalpur) Mr. Purna Chandra Meher, he said the name of Agalpur (Raj) is believed to be derived from three different words. first one is "Argala" (Means Barrier) second one is "Pur" (Means Village) and third one is "Raj" (Implying to the King's rule). It is believed that initially it was called as "Argalapur", meaning 'a village of barrier'. In ancient time, it was very difficult to reach the village "Argalapur" due to the nature's barricade of rivers (Ong, Uttali, and Gesali) and dense forest surrounding it. This might be the reason the then king of Patna State (now patnagarh) had made "Aragalapur" a hub for own protection. There are several stories that how the king of Patna State used to hide in "Argalapur" during the fight with neighbor states. It is believed that due to a major hub for Patna State king suffix "Raj" is added in the name of Agalpur (Raj).

== Demographic ==
According to the census of 2011 Agalpur village has a population of 4234 people. out of which 2212 were male while 2022 were female. In Agalpur there were 467 children (age 0-6) which makes up 11.03% of the total population. The Average Sex Ratio of Agalpur village was 914 which is lower than the Odisha state average of 979. According to 2011 Census, the literacy rate of Agalpur village was 77.59% compared to 72.87% of Odisha. This means Agalpur village has a higher literacy rate compared to Odisha. In Agalpur Male literacy stands at 86.86% while the female literacy rate was 67.52%. The total geographical area of Agalpur is about 700 hectares (Approx. 1730 Acre). There are about 1,036 houses in Agalpur village, 2011 Census tell this number. Balangir is the nearest town to Agalpur which is approximately 47 km away.

== Geographic ==
Agalpur (Raj) is situated in the middle island between three river bodies i.e. river Ong, small river Utalli and Ghensali. The coordinates where Agalpur (Raj) is situated are 21°0'48"N 83°24'29"E on the earth surface.

== Transport ==
Agalpur (Raj) is situated about 50–60 km from main district Balangir, Bargarh. Which is well communicated via buses and other road transports. There is a new bridge constructed over Ong river for the good communication during the Rainy Days. You can also find small bridges over the Ghesali and Uttali joors.

Agalpur (Raj) has a well-established bus station, with 8–10 buses operating daily to and from various destinations. There is also a direct daily bus service to the capital of Odisha (Bhubaneswar), operated by a private bus company.

== Politics ==
Despite the other socioeconomic importance of Agalpur (Raj), moreover, it is an important political hub. It comes under the Loisinga constituency for MLA election and under the Balangir constitution for MP election in the state of Odisha.

Agalpur (Raj) is a Block under the Balangir district and its office is situated in the village Duduka (About 5–7 km from Agalpur (Raj)). There are 18 Panchayats and 107 villages in Agalpur Block. Various panchayats included in the Block of Agalpur are Agalpur (Raj), Babufasad, Badtika, Bendra, Bharsuja, Budula, Duduka, Jharnipali, Kutasingha, Naongaon(A), Naongaon(B), Nuniapali, Patuapali, Rinbachan, Roth, Salebhata, and Upparbahal panchayat. Agalpur (Raj) panchayat consists of 18 wards from the villages Gudimunda, Ingsa, Nagraj. Mr. Purna Chandra Meher (from the village Agalpur (Raj)) holds the record of being elected as Sarpanch of the Agalpur panchayat for maximum 3 (Three) times. In addition people of Agalpur had also elected him as a member to the Block office (In local language Samiti Sabhya). Many developmental strategies were planned and executed during his time. Smt. Nandini Meher is the current (2022- 2027) Sarpanch of the Agalpur panchayat.

== Education ==
Agalpur (Raj) is one of the important education hub in the balangir district. It has got enough facilities for higher education like Agalpur Degree (+3) Science College, Agalpur (It is a newly established college situated on the outskirts of Agalpur, i.e. Shruti Vihar.) presently only Arts courses are being offered affiliated to sambalpur university. The enormous effort of Shri Purna Chandra Meher (founder president of the college & Ex-sarpanch of Agalpur Gram Panchayat, Agalpur) become a reality as the institute came into Grant-in-Aid (G.I.A) fold from 24 December 2013 and created its first landmark in its journey.

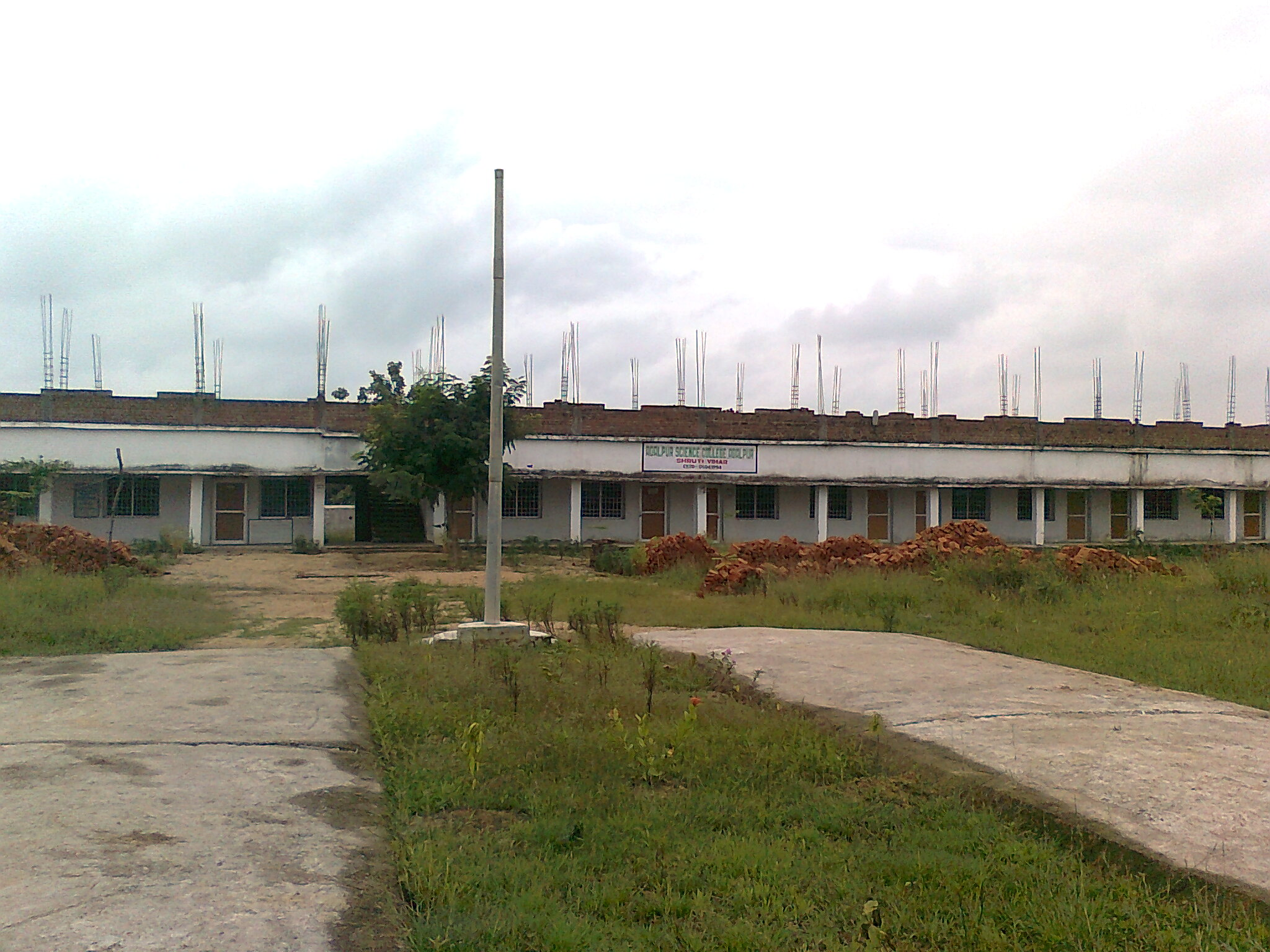
Agalpur Degree Science College, Agalpur, Shruti Vihar

Another institute Agalpur (junior) Science College (The college came into G.I.A. fold from 25 May 1991 during the session 01-June-1994) is situated in the village Agalpur provides intermediate in arts (+2) education. Agalpur Panchayat Samiti College situated at the village Roth (about 2 km from Agalpur Village) facilitates intermediate and graduate-level education. It came into G.I.A fold during the session 1988–89 on 18 August 1983.

Two High Schools namely Panchayat High School, Agalpur (Raj), S.K. Girls High School are present for better education of students of Agalpur (Raj) and villages around Agalpur. Every day hundreds of students from the nearby villages come to Agalpur (Raj) for education purposes.

For primary Education Agalpur has one of the oldest school in the area established in 1880, now it is known as Govt. Nodal U.P. School. Agalpur has also a developing Saraswati Sishu Mandir near to Panchayat Office.

For Computer education Agalpur MCC (Marvellous Computer Centre) Academy, present near to +2 College Road (Bagpada)Agalpur area and offering all regular and modular computer course.

== Banks, hospital and offices ==
Agalpur village is well connected with a branch of Punjab National Bank (a nationalized bank), a mini branch/customer service outlet of the State Bank of India, and a well-furnished branch of Utkal Gramin Bank.

Agalpur is well developed with basic amenities, including a Sub-Post Office of India Post (PIN – 767022) and a newly inaugurated Tahasil Office located near the Nodal UP School. In terms of healthcare, Agalpur has a Community Health Centre (C.H.C) under the National Rural Health Mission (NRHM).

A fire station and police station are also functioning at Agalpur. The Agalpur Police Station (Thana) was inaugurated on 9 January 2023 by the Hon’ble Chief Minister of Odisha, Shri Naveen Patnaik, through video conference.

== Sports ==
Agalpur (Raj) is always a reputed sports hub in the Balangir district. Agalpur Athletic Association a registered association (officially registered in 1983) regulates the major sports activities of Agalpur village. In ancient time Agalpur football team was among the top team in Balangir district, It had brought many glory and Agalpur (Raj) also holds recognition in good cricket around the areas.

== Temples ==
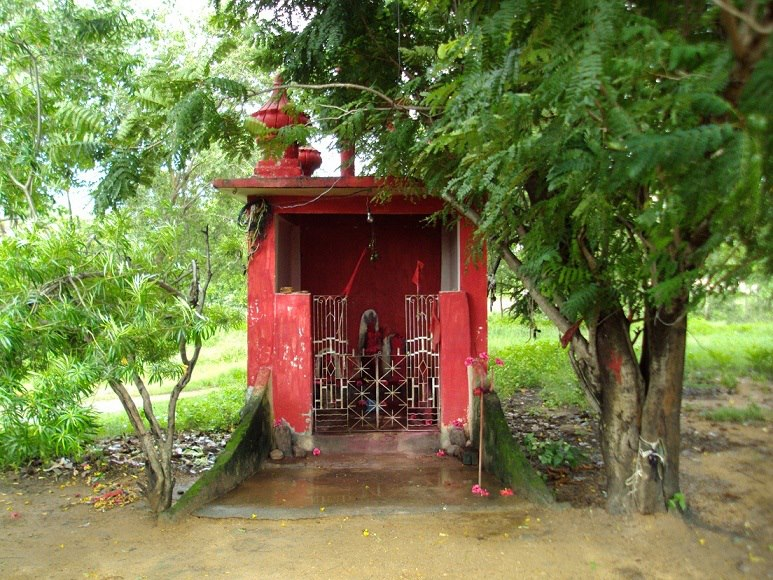
Maa Pateneswari Mandir at Agalpur

"MAA Pataneswari" being the easta devi of Agalpur (Raj) situated near the Agalpur bridge, in the bank of Ong river. "MAA Maheswari" Devi Mandir is situated in the north direction near road to the panchayat office and "Jagannath" Mandir is situated in the central hub (near bus station) of Agalpur (Raj)

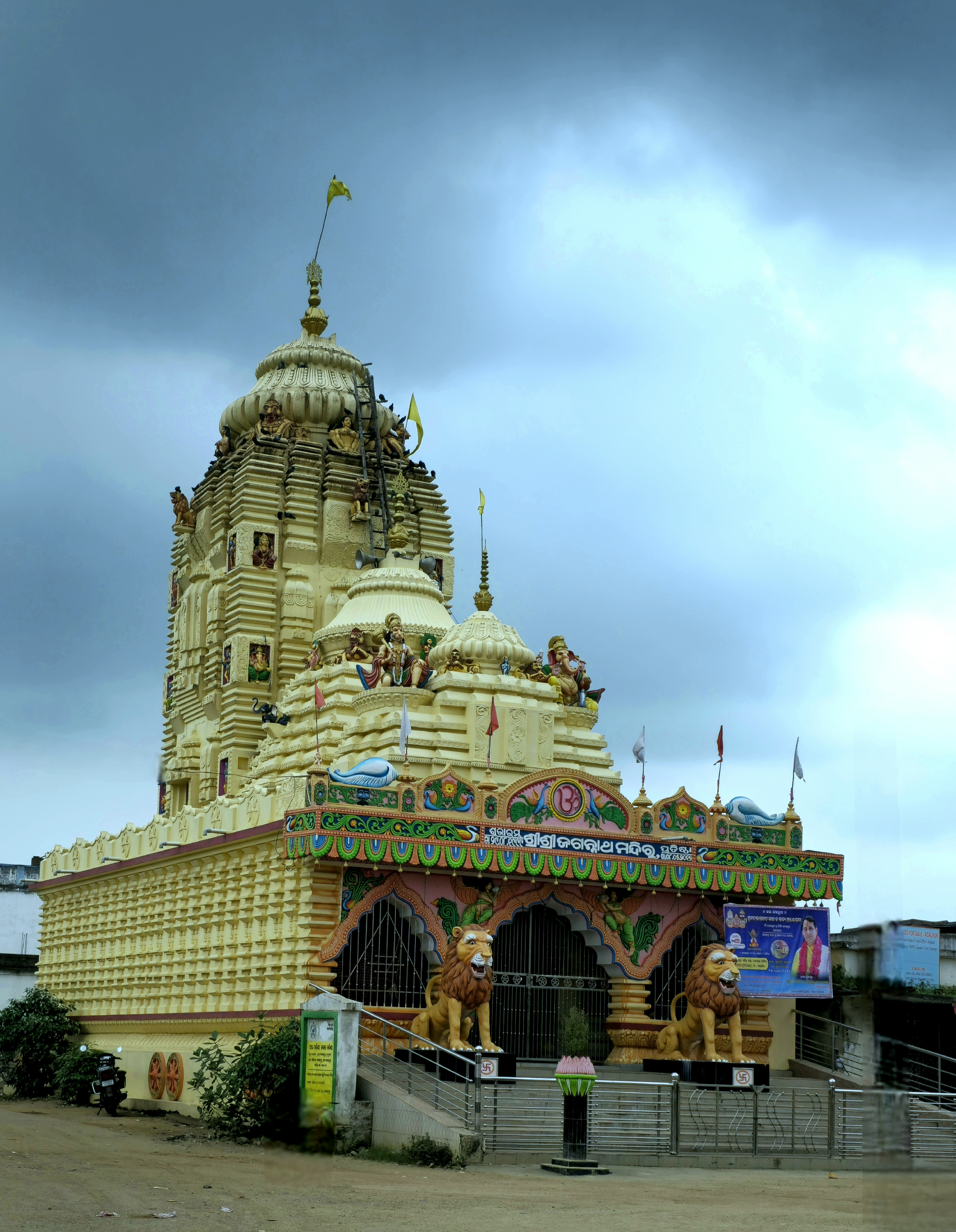
Jagannath Mandir in Agalpur village August 2024

. A "Ram" mandir is also situated in the promises of Agalpur Village. Lord Shiva Mandir is situated in Agalpur at the riverbank of "Rajghat" (A place of public bathing) at Ong river. Another Lord Shiva Mandir of Agalpur area is situated on the way to village Ingsa.

== Tourism ==
Archaeological evidence and monuments related to Buddhism have been discovered in the Agalpur area and nearby locations such as Naraj, indicating a historical Buddhist presence in the region.

Apart from this rainy day is one of the best time to enjoy the adventure in Agalpur, especially in the Rana Ghat of Ong river of Agalpur. Catching the fish in the river is one of the most enjoyable activities commonly observed.

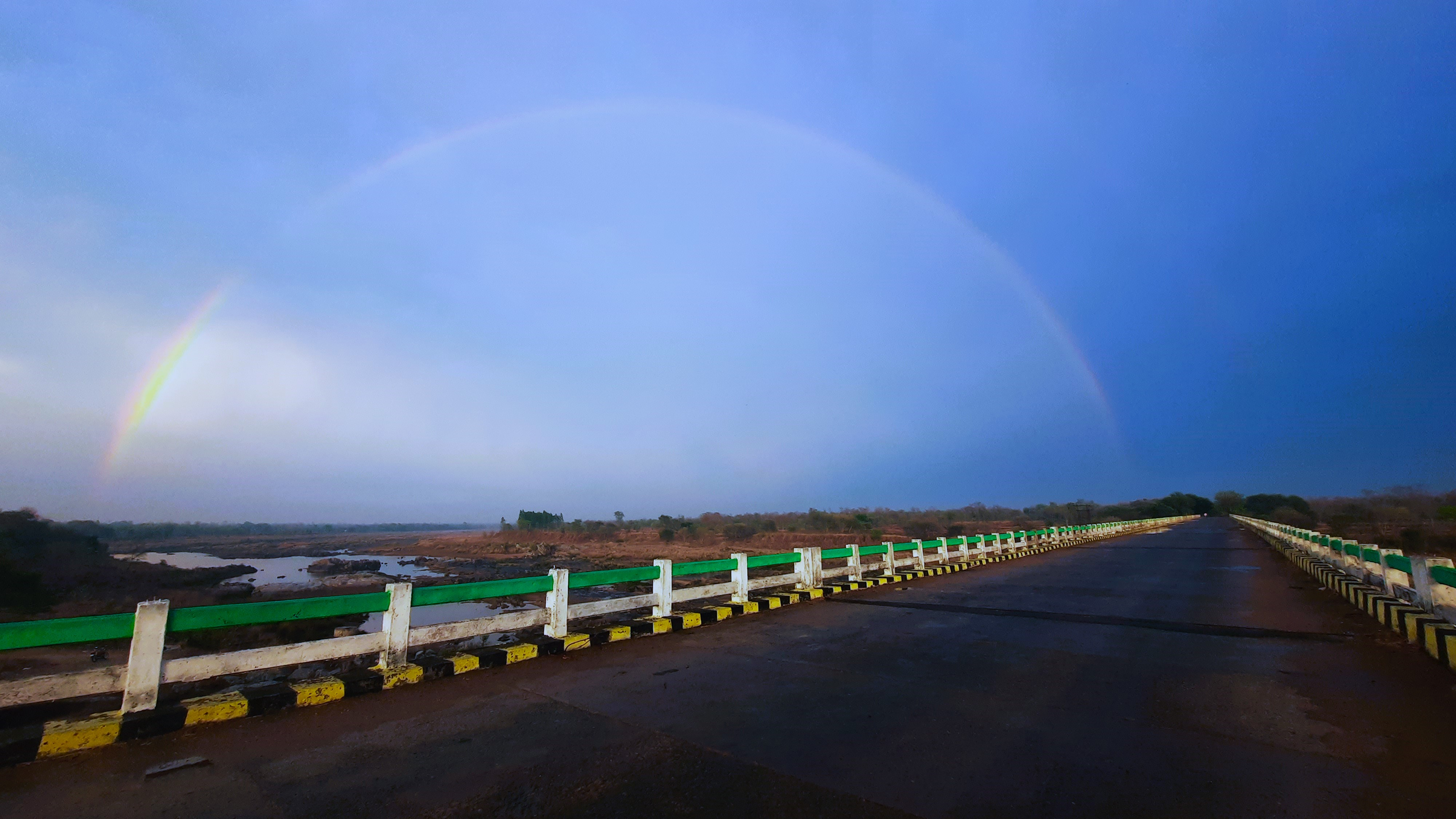
Beautiful Agalpur bridge with rainbow on Ang river

It is suggested to go for a night feast along with friends or family near the bank of Ong river. It is told that Feast (celebration) moments underneath the open sky at the bank of river and pleasant weather will always cherish one's life.
