= Nimai Charan Panigrahi =

Indian politician, lawyer and social reformer (1917–1986)

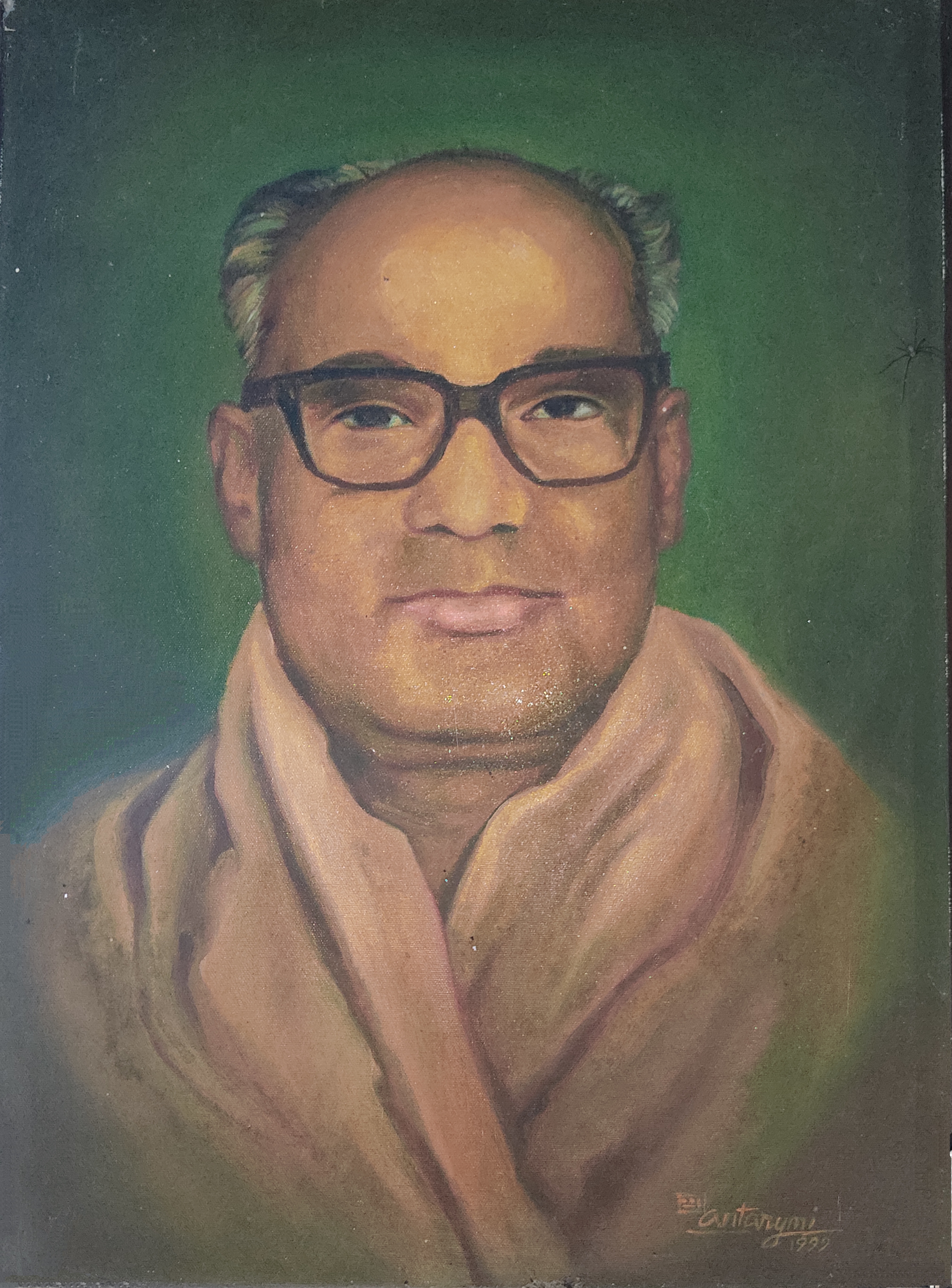

Member of the Odisha Legislative Assembly
- In office 1948–1951
- Constituency: Patnagarh Assembly constituency (earlier known as Patna)

Member of the Patna State Legislative Assembly
- In office 1945–1948

Personal details
- Born: 5 February 1917 Patna State, British India (now Balangir district, Odisha, India)
- Died: 17 April 1986 (aged 69)
- Children: Priyadarshan Panigrahi; Giribaradhari Panigrahi
- Profession: Lawyer, politician, social reformer

Nimai Charan Panigrahi (5 February 1917 – 17 April 1986) was an Indian politician, lawyer, and social reformer from Odisha. He served as a member of the Patna State Assembly from 1945 to 1948, and later represented the Patnagarh Assembly constituency, earlier known as the "Patna" constituency of Balangir district, in the Odisha Legislative Assembly. After his term in the legislative assembly, he became an active member of the Rashtriya Swayamsevak Sangh.

== Early life and social work ==
He was born on 5 February 1917 and practiced law by profession. He served as the Muktyar (legal practitioner) of Patnagarh in the erstwhile Patna state.

In 1937, he advocated for widow remarriage and the abolition of child marriage during sessions of the Brahman Mahasabha. In 1944, he led a public protest against the proposed abolition of the Patnagarh subdivision.

He also contributed to the establishment of educational institutions in the region, including Ramai High School and Jawaharlal College in Patnagarh, where he served as the first president of the college's executive body.

== Political career ==
In 1945, he co-founded the Krushak Dal (Peasants' Party). Alongside Kapil Nanda and Yudhisthir Mishra, he led protests against the administration of the Maharaja of Patna State. That same year, he became a member of the Patna State Legislative Assembly, serving until 1948.

Following the merger of Patna State with Odisha in 1948, he became a member of the Odisha Legislative Assembly representing the Patnagarh Assembly constituency. In 1951, he resigned from his position as an MLA over the Hindu Code Bill and the demand for a ban on cow slaughter.

== Association with Rashtriya Swayamsevak Sangh ==
In 1956, he joined the Rashtriya Swayamsevak Sangh (RSS). During his tenure with the organization, he held the posts of Nagar Sanghchalak, District Sanghchalak, and Bibhag Sanghchalak. During his term in office, the second Sarsanghchalak of the RSS, M. S. Golwalkar (known as Guruji), visited Patnagarh and stayed at his residence for three days.

== Personal life ==
He had two sons, Priyadarshan Panigrahi and Giribaradhari Panigrahi, both of whom are doctors.

== Death ==
He died on 17 April 1986, coinciding with the festival of Ashokastami, at the age of 69.
