= Bhaler =

Village in Balangir district, Odisha, India

Coordinates: 20.703709°N 83.540754°E

Bhaler is a village in the Balangir district, Odisha, India.
