= Patnagarh bombing =

2018 parcel bombing in Odisha, India

Coordinates: 20.710181°N 83.133503°E

The Patnagarh Bombing (also referred to as the Patnagarh Parcel Bomb in news reports) was a bombing that took place in Patnagarh, a Notified Area Council of Bolangir District in the Indian state of Odisha, on 23 February 2018. Soumya Sekhar Sahu, a 26-year-old software engineer, and his great-aunt, Jemamani Sahu, were killed by a letter bomb delivered to Soumya's house few days after his wedding. Soumya's wife, Reema, was seriously injured. After months of investigation, police arrested a colleague of Soumya's mother whom she had replaced at the college where she taught.

== Incident ==
On 23 February 2018, five days after the wedding of Soumya Sekhar Sahu and Reema Sahu, an explosion occurred at their home in Patnagarh, Odisha, India as Soumya opened a just-delivered parcel. The parcel had a return address of a person unknown to either of them, S. K. Sharma of Raipur, 230 kilometres (140 mi) away. Soumya reportedly remarked, "This looks like a wedding gift. The only thing that I don't know is the sender. I don't know anyone in Raipur". The resulting explosion tore the plaster off the ceiling, cracked the walls, and hurled the kitchen window into a nearby field. Soumya and his great-aunt Jemamani, who was visiting the couple at the time, suffered 90% TBSA burns and died en route to hospital. Reema was taken to hospital with serious injuries.

== Investigation ==
Neither of the couple had known enemies. Soumya Sekhar's parents were college lecturers. Soumya worked for a Japanese electronics firm in Bangalore.

Police still did not have a suspect a month after the fatal bombing. Pressured by media coverage, including a video of Soumya's wife wailing upon learning of her husband's death, the police turned the case over to an elite police branch in the state capital. One suspect was cleared after police traced a threatening call to Soumya shekhar, after he underwent a voluntary polygraph test, he was dismissed as a suspect. Police investigators traced the package to a courier company, but it had no office video surveillance of the package's customer.

== Arrest ==
In April 2018, Balangir police received an anonymous letter which blamed the parcel bombing on Soumya's "betrayal" and a loss of money, possibly as a result of a property dispute. The letter clarified that the sender was an S. K. Sinha, not R. K. Sharma, and also mentioned the involvement of "three men". Police investigators spent more than a month pursuing leads in four different cities. Finally, Soumya's mother studied the letter and recalled that her colleague often used the phrase "completing the project", which was similar to the phrase in the letter of "undertaking the project".

Punji Lal Meher, an English teacher and formerly the principal of the Jyoti Vikas College in Balangir district who was replaced by Soumya's mother, was arrested after having been questioned earlier and dismissed as a suspect. Upon being questioned again after the receipt of the letter by the police, Meher said that he had been approached and threatened if he didn't mail a letter. The police investigator did not believe the explanation, remarking, "It was the most incredible story that we've heard from a suspect". Police sent computer hardware belonging to the suspect to an Israeli company for analysis and recovery of deleted data.

Meher was accused of traveling to Raipur without his mobile phone or buying a train ticket and posting the parcel, returning the same day.

The suspect is thought to have had a desire "to be noticed" as an explanation of the bombing. He was taken to Raipur to be confronted by witnesses.

On 28 May 2025, Punjilal Meher was convicted and sentenced to life imprisonment for the bombing.

== Significance and aftermath ==
The parcel bombing was widely reported in India and other countries. The BBC characterized it as having "riveted India". A film, titled Bullet Raja, is planned starring Odia actor Hara Rath and directed by Sridhar Martha. Another movie, Mind Game starring Manoj Mishra, Atul Kulkarni, Chinmay Mishra, and Anu Choudhury, directed by Rajesh Touchriver and produced by Sridhar Martha is based on the incident.
