= Patnagarh Assembly constituency =

Constituency of the Odisha legislative assembly in India

Coordinates: 20.71°N 83.13°E

Patnagarh
- Constituency No. 67 for the Odisha Legislative Assembly

Constituency details
- Country: India
- Region: East India
- State: Odisha
- Division: Northern Division
- District: Balangir
- Lok Sabha constituency: Bolangir
- Established: 1951
- Total electors: 3,06,231 (Note: as on 2024) (Note: as data published by election commission)
- Reservation: None

Member of Legislative Assembly
- 17th Odisha Legislative Assembly
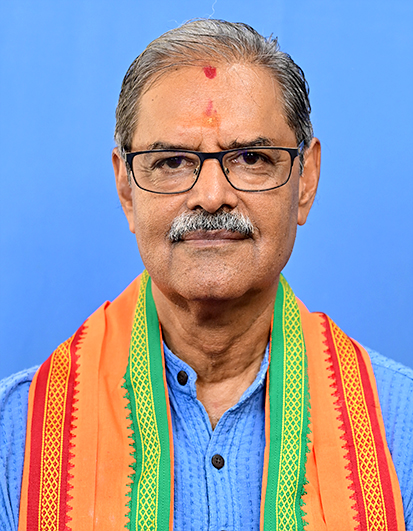
- Incumbent Kanak Vardhan Singh Deo; Deputy Chief Minister of Odisha
- Party: Bharatiya Janata Party
- Elected year: 2024

Patnagarh is a Vidhan Sabha constituency of Balangir district, Odisha.

This constituency includes Patnagarh, Patnagarh block, Belpara block and Khaprakhol block.

== Elected members ==
Vote share of winning candidates
2024	41.64%
2019	43.40%
2014	40.58%
2009	40.31%
2004	55.78%
2000	64.96%
1995	62.21%
1990	43.67%
1985	43.05%
1980	55.43%
1977	55.91%

Since its formation in 1951, 17 elections have been held in the constituency till date. It was a 2-member constituency for 1952 & 1957.

Elected members from the Patnagarh constituency are:

Year	Member	Party
2024	Kanak Vardhan Singh Deo	Bharatiya Janata Party
2019	Saroj Kumar Meher	Biju Janata Dal
2014	Kanak Vardhan Singh Deo	Bharatiya Janata Party
2009	Kanak Vardhan Singh Deo	Bharatiya Janata Party
2004	Kanak Vardhan Singh Deo	Bharatiya Janata Party
2000	Kanak Vardhan Singh Deo	Bharatiya Janata Party
1995	Kanak Vardhan Singh Deo	Bharatiya Janata Party
1990	Bibekananda Meher	Janata Dal
1985	Sushil Kumar Prusty	Indian National Congress
1980	Brajamohan Thakur	Indian National Congress (I)
1977	Bibekananda Meher	Janata Party
1974	Ainthu Sahoo	Swatantra Party
1971	Ainthu Sahoo	Swatantra Party
1967	Ainthu Sahoo	Swatantra Party
1961	Ramesh Chandra Bhoi	Swatantra Party
1957 (Note: It was a 2 member constituency)	Ainthu Sahoo	Swatantra Party
1957	Asharam Bhoi	Ganatantra Parishad
1951 (Note: It was a 2 member constituency)	Arjun Das	Ganatantra Parishad
1951	Ganesh Ram Bariah	Ganatantra Parishad
1946	Nimai Charan Panigrahi	Independent politician

== Election results ==
=== 2024 ===
Voting was held on 20 May 2024 in 2nd phase of Odisha Assembly Election & 5th phase of Indian General Election. Counting of votes was on 4 June 2024. In 2024 election, Bharatiya Janata Party candidate Kanak Vardhan Singh Deo defeated Biju Janata Dal candidate Saroj Kumar Meher by a margin of 1,357 votes.

2024 Odisha Vidhan Sabha Election: Patnagarh
Party	Candidate	Votes	%	±%
BJP	Kanak Vardhan Singh Deo	93,823	41.64	▲3.68
BJD	Saroj Kumar Meher	92,466	41.04	▼2.36
INC	Anil Meher	26,549	11.78	▼3.14
NOTA	None of the above	2,460	1.09	▼0.56
Majority		1,357	0.60	▼4.84
Turnout		2,25,308	73.57	
BJP gain from BJD				

=== 2019 ===
In 2019 election, Biju Janata Dal candidate Saroj Kumar Meher defeated Bharatiya Janata Party candidate Kanak Vardhan Singh Deo by a margin of 11,028 votes.

2019 Vidhan Sabha Election, Patnagarh
Party	Candidate	Votes	%	±%
BJD	Saroj Kumar Meher	88,756	43.40	▲10.27
BJP	Kanak Vardhan Singh Deo	77,003	37.96	▼2.62
INC	Ramesh Kumar Purohit	30,253	14.92	▼3.46
NOTA	None of the above	3,347	1.65	
Majority		11,028	5.44	
Turnout		2,03,779	72.74	
BJD gain from BJP		Swing		

=== 2014 ===
In 2014 election, Bharatiya Janata Party candidate Kanak Vardhan Singh Deo defeated Biju Janata Dal candidate Prakriti Devi Singh Deo by a margin of 13,653 votes.

2014 Vidhan Sabha Election, Patnagarh
Party	Candidate	Votes	%	±%
BJP	Kanak Vardhan Singh Deo	74,372	40.58	▲0.27
BJD	Prakriti Devi Singh Deo	60,719	33.13	▲5.03
INC	Kishor Kumar Parichha	33,697	18.38	▼5.77
NOTA	None of the above	3,079	1.68	−
Majority		13,653	7.45	▼4.76
Turnout		1,83,295	73	5.58
Registered electors		2,51,089		
BJP hold				

=== 2009 ===
In 2009 election, Bharatiya Janata Party candidate Kanak Vardhan Singh Deo defeated Biju Janata Dal candidate Prakriti Devi Singh Deo by a margin of 19,382 votes.

2009 Vidhan Sabha Election: Patnagarh
Party	Candidate	Votes	%	±%
BJP	Kanak Vardhan Singh Deo	63,996	40.31	▼15.47
BJD	Prakriti Devi Singh Deo	44,614	28.10	
INC	Bebekananda Meher	38,350	24.15	
Majority		19,382	12.21 (Note: % of total valid votes)	−
Turnout		1,58,826	67.42	−
BJP hold		Swing	-1.35 (Note: 2004 Voter turnout was 68.77%)	
