= Biripali =

Location in India

Biripali Bedapada
- bedapara Village
- Nickname: Biripali
- Location in Odisha, India Biripali (India)
- Coordinates: 20.3353232°N 82.81828°E
- Country: India
- State: Odisha
- District: Balangir
- Tehsil: Bangomunda

Population (Census 2011)
  - Total: 1,811

Languages
  - Official: Odia
  - Spoken: Sambalpuri
- Time zone: UTC+5:30 (IST)
- PIN: 767040
- Telephone code: 06652
- Vehicle registration: OD 03
- Website: balangir.nic.in

Biripali is a village located in Bangomunda of Balangir district, Orissa, India. Biripali Panchayat combined with Biripali, Bedapara, Kuturabeda, Tetelpara with total population of 4,099. Bhubaneswar is the state capital for Biripali village. The local language is Sambalpuri, which is a dialect of Odia.

== Education ==
- Biripali Govt. Primary School, was established in 1949 and it is managed by the Department of Education Orissa. one of oldest school in the district.
- Biripali Govt. Upper Primary School - Founded in 1966.
- Panchayat High School - (Biripali High School) one of oldest high school. It was established in 1984.

Primary School Bedapara

== Sex Ratio ==
Total population is 1,811. Sex Ratio is 919 males to 892 females, as per population Census 2011.

== Literacy Rate ==
Village Literacy rate is 50.57%, of which Male literacy 60.12% and female literacy rate 40.18%.
