= Kantabanji Assembly constituency =

Constituency of the Odisha legislative assembly in India

Coordinates: 20.47°N 82.92°E

Kantabanji
- Constituency No. 70 for the Odisha Legislative Assembly

Constituency details
- Country: India
- Region: East India
- State: Odisha
- Division: Northern Division
- District: Balangir
- Lok Sabha constituency: Bolangir
- Established: 1961
- Total electors: 3,50,47 (Note: as on 2024) (Note: as data published by election commission)
- Reservation: None

Member of Legislative Assembly
- 17th Odisha Legislative Assembly
- Incumbent Laxman Bag
- Party: Bharatiya Janata Party
- Elected year: 2024

Kantabanji is a Vidhan Sabha constituency of Balangir district, Odisha.

This constituency includes Kantabanji, Turekela block, Bangomunda block and Muribahal block.

MLAs were Prasanna Pal of JD in 1990, independent candidate Chaitanya Pradhan in 1985, Prasanna Kumar Pal representing INC (I) in 1980 and representing INC in 1977. This seat became very trending when Naveen Patnaik got defeated here.

== Elected members ==
Vote share of winning candidates
2024	44.57%
2019	33.60%
2014	31.65%
2009	43.24%
2004	40.68%
2000	29.24%
1995	44.80%
1990	46.25%
1985	46.68%
1980	54.84%
1977	42.33%

Since its formation in 1961, 15 elections were held till date.

List of members elected from Kantabanji constituency are:

Year	Member	Party
2024	Laxman Bag	Bharatiya Janata Party
2019	Santosh Singh Saluja	Indian National Congress
2014	Laxman Bag	Bharatiya Janata Party
2009	Santosh Singh Saluja	Indian National Congress
2004	Haji Md. Ayub Khan	Independent politician
2000	Ramesh Chandra Dash	All India Trinamool Congress
1995	Paramananda Hatti	Bharatiya Janata Party
1990	Prasanna Pal	Janata Dal
1985	Chaitanya Pradhan	Independent politician
1980	Prasanna Pal	Indian National Congress (I)
1977	Prasanna Pal	Indian National Congress
1974	Ram Prasad Mishra	Swatantra Party
1971	Achyutananda Mahananda	Swatantra Party
1967	Lokanath Rai	Swatantra Party
1961	Rajendra Narayan Singh Deo	Swatantra Party

== Election Results ==
=== 2024 ===
Voting were held on 20 May 2024 in 2nd phase of Odisha Assembly Election & 5th phase of Indian General Election. Counting of votes was on 4 June 2024. In 2024 election, Bharatiya Janata Party candidate Laxman Bag defeated Biju Janata Dal candidate Naveen Patnaik by a margin of 16,344 votes.

2024 Odisha Vidhan Sabha Election, Kantabanji
Party	Candidate	Votes	%	±%
BJP	Laxman Bag	90,876	44.57	▲11.04
BJD	Naveen Patnaik	74,532	36.56	▲8.04
INC	Santosh Singh Saluja	26,839	13.16	▼20.44
NOTA	None of the above	1,649	0.81	▼0.47
Majority		16,344	8.01	
Turnout		2,03,874	73.28	
BJP gain from INC				

=== 2019 ===
In 2019 election, Indian National Congress candidate Santosh Singh Saluja defeated Bharatiya Janata Party candidate Laxman Bag by a margin of 128 votes.

2019 Vidhan Sabha Election, Kantabanji
Party	Candidate	Votes	%	±%
INC	Santosh Singh Saluja	64,246	33.60	▲4.17
BJP	Laxman Bag	64,118	33.53	▲15.80
BJD	Ajaya Kumar Das	54,527	28.51	▼3.14
NOTA	None of the above	2,453	1.28	
Majority		128	0.07	
Turnout		1,91,234	68.33	
INC gain from BJD				

=== 2014 ===
In 2014 election, Biju Janata Dal candidate Haji Md. Ayub Khan defeated Indian National Congress candidate Santosh Singh Saluja, who was seeking re-election, by a margin of 3,868 votes.

2014 Vidhan Sabha Election, Kantabanji
Party	Candidate	Votes	%	±%
BJD	Haji Md. Ayub Khan	55,252	31.65	▼9.05
INC	Santosh Singh Saluja	51,384	29.43	▼13.81
BJP	Laxman Bag	30,961	17.73	▲6.58
NOTA	None of the above	1,729	0.99	−
Majority		3,868	2.22	▼1.45
Turnout		1,74,582	72.34	▲3.43
Registered electors		2,41,337		
BJD gain from INC				

=== 2009 ===
In 2009 election, Indian National Congress candidate Santosh Singh Saluja defeated Biju Janata Dal candidate Haji Md. Ayub Khan by a margin of 5,304 votes.

2009 Vidhan Sabha Election, Kantabanji
Party	Candidate	Votes	%	±%
INC	Santosh Singh Saluja	62,495	43.24	▲11.19
BJD	Haji Md. Ayub Khan	57,191	40.70	▼15.56
BJP	Ajay Kumar Das	16,117	11.15	−
Majority		5,304	3.67 (Note: % of total valid votes)	−
Turnout		1,44,549	68.91	−
INC gain from Independent		Swing	3.55 (Note: 2004 Voter turnout was 65.36%)	
