= Saintala =

Taluk in Odisha, India

- village
- Location in Odisha, India
- Coordinates: 20°26′0″N 83°20′0″E
- Country: India
- State: Odisha
- District: Balangir
- Elevation: 182 m (597 ft)
- Time zone: UTC+5:30 (IST)
- PIN: 767032
- Telephone code: 06655
- Vehicle registration: OR-03
- Coastline: 0 kilometres (0 mi)
- Lok Sabha constituency: Balangir
- Vidhan Sabha constituency: Titlagarh
- Climate: Tropical monsoon (Köppen)
- Website: odisha.gov.in

Saintala is a taluk located at about 35 kilometres (22 mi) south of the Balangir-Titlagarh road in Titlagarh sub-division of Bolangir district, Odisha, India. It was formerly known as Sainyatala.

National Highway 201 passes through Saintala.

== Geography ==
Saintala is located on the southern plateau, surrounded by evergreen forests, hills, rivers, and farmlands.

Saintala is well connected with both roadways and railways. National Highway 201 passes through it and also other roads connects it with nearby villages. Saintala Railway Station is located about 4 kilometres (2.5 mi) from the village.
