= Kantabanji =

- Town
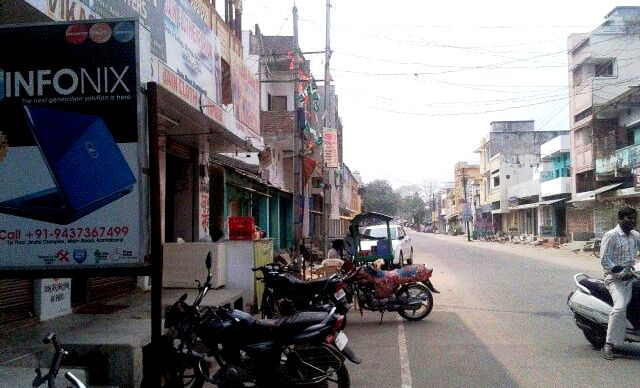
- Nickname: KBJ
- Location in Odisha, India Kantabanji (India) Kantabanji (Asia) Kantabanji (Earth)
- Coordinates: 20°28′59″N 82°55′00″E
- Country: India
- State: Odisha
- District: Bolangir

Government
  - Type: NAC
  - Body: Kantabanji NAC
  - MLA: Sri Laxman Bag (BJP)
  - MP: Sangeeta kumari Singh Deo,(BJP)
- Elevation: 298 m (978 ft)

Population (2024)
  - Total: 38,598

Languages
  - sambalpuri kosali Hindi Official: Odia, English
- Time zone: UTC+5:30 (IST)
- PIN: 767039
- Area code: +91 6657
- Vehicle registration: OD-03
- Website: odisha.gov.in

Kantabanji (KBJ) is a notified area council in Balangir district in the Indian state of Odisha.

== History ==
In 1937, the railway track from Kantabanji to Vishakhapatnam was laid and since then train started running through this route. At that time no one was aware of Kantabanji. That time it was a small village under the Bangomunda police station a village near to Kantabanji. Rajendra Narayan Singh Deo who was the king of Patnagarh at that time. He was also the chief minister of Orissa from an independent party, helped extremely to explore Kantabanji and then people started living there. He was the grandfather of K.V. Singh Deo (MLA) of Patnagarh. Raj Gopala Charya helped R.N. Singh Deo become the chief minister of Orissa.

The planning of this town was similar to the planning of Chandigarh or Jaipur, i.e., there is more than one way to go to the adjacent street which is a short way. Every two street is connected with more than one small street so that the person need not have to cover the full distance to go to next street. Nearest Pilgrimage Places is Ranipur Jharial is 23–24 km from Kantabanji which is famous for 64 Yogini And Vishnu Temples, Harishankar Temple will be 56 kilometers away.It is beside India's second largest teakwood forest located at Mahakhand.

In 2009, Kantabanji got its first I.A.S. officer from the town and later in 2012, it got another one. Many students of this town have become engineers, doctors, Charted Accountants, officers, advocates etc. Slowly the standard of Kantabanji is increasing. The facilities of hospital and medical shops has also increased. The economy of Kantabanji is increasing. Many new routes of trains has been discovered. Kantabanji has become the center of business for nearby areas (Kantabanji). The business market in kantabanji is completely dominated by Marwaries (Baniya) and all the festivals are celebrated in a fanfare way. The town has highest number of Chartered Accountants ( currently more than Hundred), engineers, doctors, Civil Servants (currently more than five) across western odisha.

Recently it has been declared as Municipality by the State Government.

== Geography ==
Kantabanji is located at 20°28′59″N 82°55′00″E. It has an average elevation of 298 m (978 ft). It is almost 80 km (50 mi) from its district headquarters Bolangir. It is around 440 km (270 mi) from its capital city of Bhubaneshwar. The climate of the town is varied with a summer high of 48 °C (118 °F) and a winter low of 5 °C (41 °F) and heavy rains during the rainy season.

== Transport ==
Kantabanji is an important railway station on the Vizianagaram-Raipur main line of East Coast Railway Zone. All trains passing through this line halt here for about 5–15 minutes. It is the next major station after Titlagarh.

== Demographics ==
As of the 2001 Indian census, Kantabanji had a population of 20,090. Males constitute 52% of the population and females 48%. Kantabanji has an average literacy rate of 66%, higher than the national average of 59.5%. Male literacy is 78% and female literacy is 56%. 13% of the population of Kantabanji is under 6 years of age.

== Economy ==
Kantabanji is located in western Odisha, a business center for the nearby villages and a business hub in western Odisha. Cotton and paddy are the major crops grown and the produce sold to private buyers as well as to the government.

Kantabanji has two malls - Muskan Mall where everything is available under one roof, from grocery, clothes to entertainment everything is available at best price, and "Sai Central" which is under construction.

== Politics ==
Kantabanji (Vidhan Sabha constituency) includes Kantabanji, Turekela block, Bangomunda block and Muribahal block. Kantabanji is part of Bolangir (Lok Sabha constituency).

The current MLA from the Kantabanji Assembly Constituency is Mr. Laxman Bag of the Bhartiya Janta Party, who won the seat in Odisha state assembly elections 2024, Previous MLAs from this seat were Indian National Congress Veteran Santosh Singh Saluja in 2019, 2009, 2000, 1995 & Haji Mohammad Ayyub Khan of the Biju Janata Dal, who won the seat in 2009 & 2004 Odisha State Assembly Elections. & Prasanna Pal of JD in 1990, Independent candidate Chaitanya Pradhan in 1985, Prasanna Kumar Pal representing INC (I) in 1980 and representing INC in 1977.

== Education ==
There are more than 11 schools in Katabanji.

=== Schools ===
English medium schools

- St. Xavier's High School (Chatuanka)
- Kantabanji Lions Public School.
- Jmj English Medium School
- Muskan International School
- Hello Kids School.

Oriya medium schools

- Saraswati Sishu Vidya Mandir
- Govt. Girls High School,
- Kantabanji Nclp
- Kantabanji Rly Govt. Upper Primary School

Hindi medium schools

- Navajeevan Vidyalaya Upper Primary
- Saraswati Sishu Vidya Mandir

=== Colleges ===
- K.V. College
- Women's college

Among these two colleges, K.V. College has +2 science.

== See also ==
- Western Odisha
- Balangir
- Bangomunda
- Government of Odisha
- Naveen Patnaik
- Kalikesh Narayan Singh Deo
- Sangeeta Kumari Singh Deo
