= Saroj Kumar Meher =

Indian politician

Member of Odisha Legislative Assembly
- In office 2019–2024
- Preceded by: Kanak Vardhan Singh Deo
- Constituency: Patnagarh

Personal details
- Political party: Biju Janata Dal
- Profession: Politician

Saroj Kumar Meher is an Indian politician from Odisha. He was a Member of the Odisha Legislative Assembly from 2019-2024, representing Patnagarh Assembly constituency as a Member of the Biju Janata Dal. He narrowly lost the 2024 election to Kanak Singh Deo.

== See also ==
- 2019 Odisha Legislative Assembly election
- Odisha Legislative Assembly
