= Sulia Jatra =

Celebration in Khairguda, Odisha, India

Sulia Jatra is celebrated in the village of Khairguda, situated in Balangir district, Western Odisha. It is widely reported that thousands of animals and birds are sacrificed during this festival which takes place on the second Tuesday of the month of Pausha.

== Origin ==
Sulia Jatra is named after the god Sulia of tribal communities. The place is surrounded with nature. The animal sacrifice is a long tradition of the Kandha tribes. They believe that it will bring success and prosperity to the community by offering blood to the Sulia god. It was also reported that eight sub castes of the Kandha worship Sulia as their presiding deity in this 500-year-old tradition.

== Media coverage ==
The Sulia Jatra has received media coverage, including:

- Karan, Jajati (January 17, 2008). "Tribals celebrate banned Sulia Jatra festival". IBN Live. Archived from the original on October 14, 2012.
- "HC to hear plea against animal sacrifice in Sulia on Monday". The Times of India. January 8, 2011. Archived from the original on November 4, 2012.
- "Tribals sacrifice hundreds of animals in Orissa". Deccan Herald. 11 January 2011.
