= Laxman Bag =

Indian politician

Laxman Bag Yadav

Member of Odisha Legislative Assembly
- Incumbent
- Assumed office 4 Jun 2024
- Preceded by: Santosh Singh Saluja
- Constituency: Kantabanji

Personal details
- Born: 16 March 1975 (age 51) Khutulumunda, Kantabanji
- Party: Bharatiya Janata Party
- Spouse: Smt. Pabita Bag
- Parent: Late Shankar Bag (father)
- Occupation: Politician

Laxman Bag Yadav is an Indian politician. He was elected to Odisha Legislative Assembly from Kantabanji defeating Naveen Patnaik as a member of the Bharatiya Janata Party.
