= Loisinga =

Loisingha
- Town
- Location in Odisha, India Loisingha (India)
- Coordinates: 20°52′0″N 83°31′0″E
- Country: India
- State: Odisha
- District: Balangir
- Elevation: 162 m (531 ft)

Population
  - Total: 6,220

Languages
  - Official: Odia
  - Local: Sambalpuri
- Time zone: UTC+5:30 (IST)
- PIN: 767020
- Telephone code: 06653
- Vehicle registration: OD-03
- Coastline: 0 kilometres (0 mi)
- Lok Sabha constituency: Balangir
- Climate: Tropical monsoon (Köppen)
- Website: odisha.gov.in

Loisingha is a small town in Bolangir district, Odisha, India.

== Geography ==
It is located at 20°52′0″N 83°31′0″E at an elevation of 162 m from mean sea level (MSL). The town is situated on the bank of river Suktel. (which flows on the southern side of the town).

== Location ==
National Highway 26 passes through Loisingha. Loisingha is 18 km from its headquarters Bolangir, towards Bargarh.

== Climate ==
Loisingha experiences three distinct seasons: summer, monsoon and winter. Typical summer months are from February to June, with maximum temperatures ranging from 35 °C to 45 °C. May is the warmest month in Loisingha, although summer doesn't end until May. The city often receives heavy thundershowers in May (and the humidity level remains high). During the hottest months, the nights are usually very warm due to high humidity. The monsoon lasts from June to September, with moderate/high rainfall and temperatures ranging from 15 °C to 35 °C. Winter begins in October; the daytime temperature hovers around 28 °C (82 °F) while night temperature is below 15 °C for most of December and January.

== Economy ==
Most of the people depend on agriculture. Nowadays, most of people are inclined towards the business. Many of them are managing their livelihood by the means of small businesses. The most recent trend has been that many of younger generation are migrating to other states looking for jobs or opting for jobs in after a degree or diploma in technical skill based education. As a result of all these, the per capita income of individuals has gone up nowadays. Some people depend on businesses of handicraft and weaving.

== Culture and Religion ==
Loisingha is a culturally rich town.first of all Nuakhai with addition to Ratha Jatra and Bahuda Jatra, every year the people here celebrate the famous Janghadeo Jatra also called Kundadeo Jatra. While Jogisarda is famous for the Maha Sivaratri festival around the Jogeswara Temple, also celebrates Dola Purnima (Holi), Ganesh Puja, Saraswati Puja, Biswakarma Puja, Maa Durga Puja, Maa Samalei Puja, Gaja Laxmi Puja every year. The village also celebrate drama festival on lord Maa Laxmi, Shri Jagannatha, Sri Balabhadra based on Laxmi Puran on the occasion of Margasira month.

== Civil Servants ==
Shri Amit Kumar Meher and Miss. Anasuya Bagdevi cracked Odisha Civil Services Examination belongs from Loisingha.

== Educational institutions ==
- Loisingha Junior College, Loisingha (offered Science and Arts)
- Loisingha Degree College, Loisingha (offered Science and Arts )
- H.K.Mahatab Govt. High School, Loisingha
- Govt.(New)Girls High School, Loisingha
- Saraswati Sishu Vidya Mandir, Loisingha
- Basti Project U P School, Loisingha
- Upper Primary School, Loisingha
- M.E. School, Loisingha
- Block Primary School, Loisingha
- Odisha Adarsha Vidyalaya, Jharmunda, Loisingha
- Dayasagar Public School (Private), Burda, Loisingha
- The Queen International (Private), Loisingha

== Member of Legislative Assembly ==
Sixteen elections were held between 1957 and 2024. Elected members from the Loisingha constituency:

- 2024: (66): Dr. Mukesh Mahaling (BJP)
- 2019: (66): Dr. Mukesh Mahaling (BJP)
- 2014: (66): Jogendra Behera (BJD)
- 2009: (66): Ramakanta Seth (Biju Janata Dal|BJD)
- 2004: (110): Narasingha Mishra (Congress)
- 2000: (110): Balgopal Mishra (BJP)
- 1995: (110): Balgopal Mishra (Independent)
- 1990: (110): Narasingha Mishra (Janata Dal)
- 1985: (110): Balgopal Mishra (Independent)
- 1980: (110): Balgopal Mishra (Independent)
- 1977: (110): Ram Prasad Misra (Janata Party)
- 1974: (110): Ananga Udaya Singh Deo (Swatantra Party)
- 1971: (104): Nandakishore Misra (Swatantra Party)
- 1967: (104): Nandakishore Misra (Swatantra Party)
- 1961: (45): Ram Prasad Misra (Ganatantra Parishad)
- 1957: (32): Ram Prasad Misra (Ganatantra Parishad)

== Constituency ==
- Loisingha (Odisha Vidhan Sabha constituency)
