= Bangomunda =

Bangomunda Banganmura
- Town
- Nickname: BGM
- Location in Odisha, India Bangomunda (India)
- Coordinates: 20°20′37″N 82°54′35″E
- Country: India
- State: Odisha
- District: Balangir

Government
  - Block Chairman: Ranjubala Behera
  - Sarpanch: Ajit Joshi
- Elevation: 182 m (597 ft)
  - Density: 251/km^{2} (650/sq mi)

Languages
  - Official: Odia
  - Local: Sambalpuri
- Time zone: UTC+5:30 (IST)
- PIN: 767040
- Telephone code: 06657
- Vehicle registration: OD-03
- Coastline: 0 kilometres (0 mi)
- Nearest town: Kantabanji
- Lok Sabha constituency: Balangir
- Vidhan Sabha constituency: Kantabanji
- Civic agency: Block Gram Panchayat Tehsil
- Climate: Tropical monsoon (Köppen)
- Avg. summer temperature: 40 °C (104 °F)
- Avg. winter temperature: 20 °C (68 °F)
- Website: balangir.nic.in

Bangomunda is a tehsil in the Balangir district of Odisha, India with historical importance. It is located 72 km (45 mi) from the district in the town of Balangir. Bangomunda was formerly known as Banganmura which means Brinjal Firm.

== Places of interest ==
Ranipur-Jharial (also known as Somatirtha) is a tourist destination in Odisha just 7 km (4.3 mi) from Bangomunda. Durga Mandir, a famous temple in the region, is situated on the bank of the village's pond.

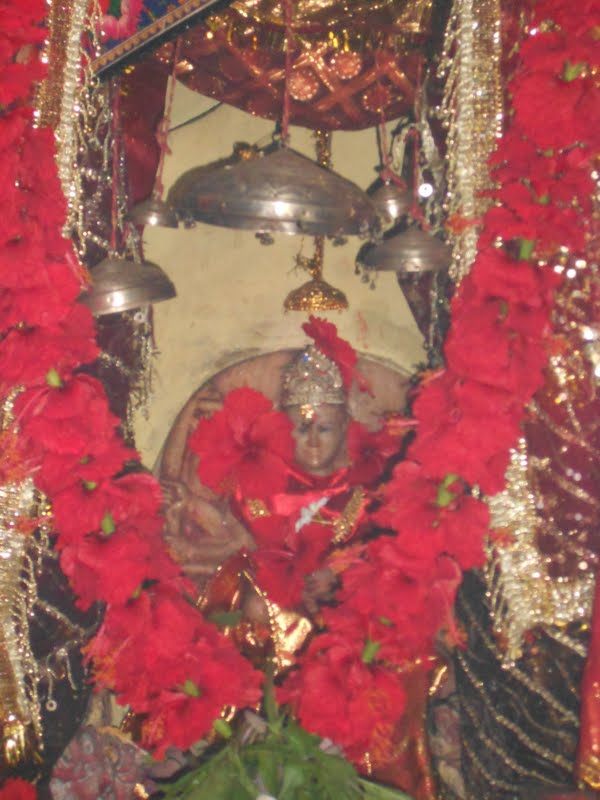
Durga Mandir

== Festivals ==
The people of Bangomunda celebrate most of the festivals of Odisha like Rath Yatra, Durga Puja, Diwali, Kumar Purnima or Gaja Laxmi Puja, Manabasa Gurubar, Sabitri Brata, Makar Sankranti, Bishuba/Pana Sankranti, Dola Purnima or Holi, Gamha Purnima or Rakshya Bandhan, Kartik Purnima, Nabanna or Nuakhai, Pua jiuntia, Bhai jiuntia, Janmastami, Ram Navami, Saraswati Puja, and Ganesh Puja. The primary festival, however, is Nuakhai.

Some festivals are unique to the place, like Chatar jatra, Kansa Badha, Dhanu Yatra, and Navratri Durgapuja. Bhai jiuntia is celebrated during this time on Astami Tithi. In "Bhai jiuntia" sisters pray for their brothers' long life and tie a thread called "Jiuntia". Nuakhai is also an important festival which is celebrated on Panchami tithi of Bhadraba sukla pakshya.

== Demographics ==
As per 2011 Census of India, Bangomunda had a population of 5,759, consisting of 2,802 males and 2,957 females. Schedule Castes constituted 1318 people and Schedule Tribes constituted 481 people. The literacy rate was 60.27%.

== Education ==
There are government schools in town for primary as well as secondary education. C.M. High School is for class 8th to 10th. Saraswati Shishu Mandir and Akhil Bharatiya English Medium School are private schools. Panchayat Samiti College is for college education, but is limited to arts stream only.

Many of the students are studying outside the state for higher education and a few have studied abroad as well. Besides educational institutes, there are also centers for computer learning and industrial training.

== Public transport ==
The town is in the center point of three commercial hubs of Odisha. Public transportation is limited here as only a bus facility is available. The nearest railway station is in Kantabanji which is about 16 km (9.9 mi) away. The nearest airport is in Raipur.

Durga Puja

Independence day celebration in town field

Temple of the primary deity of the village

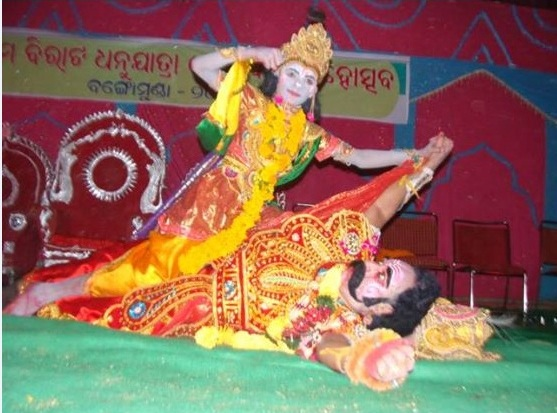
DhanuYatra

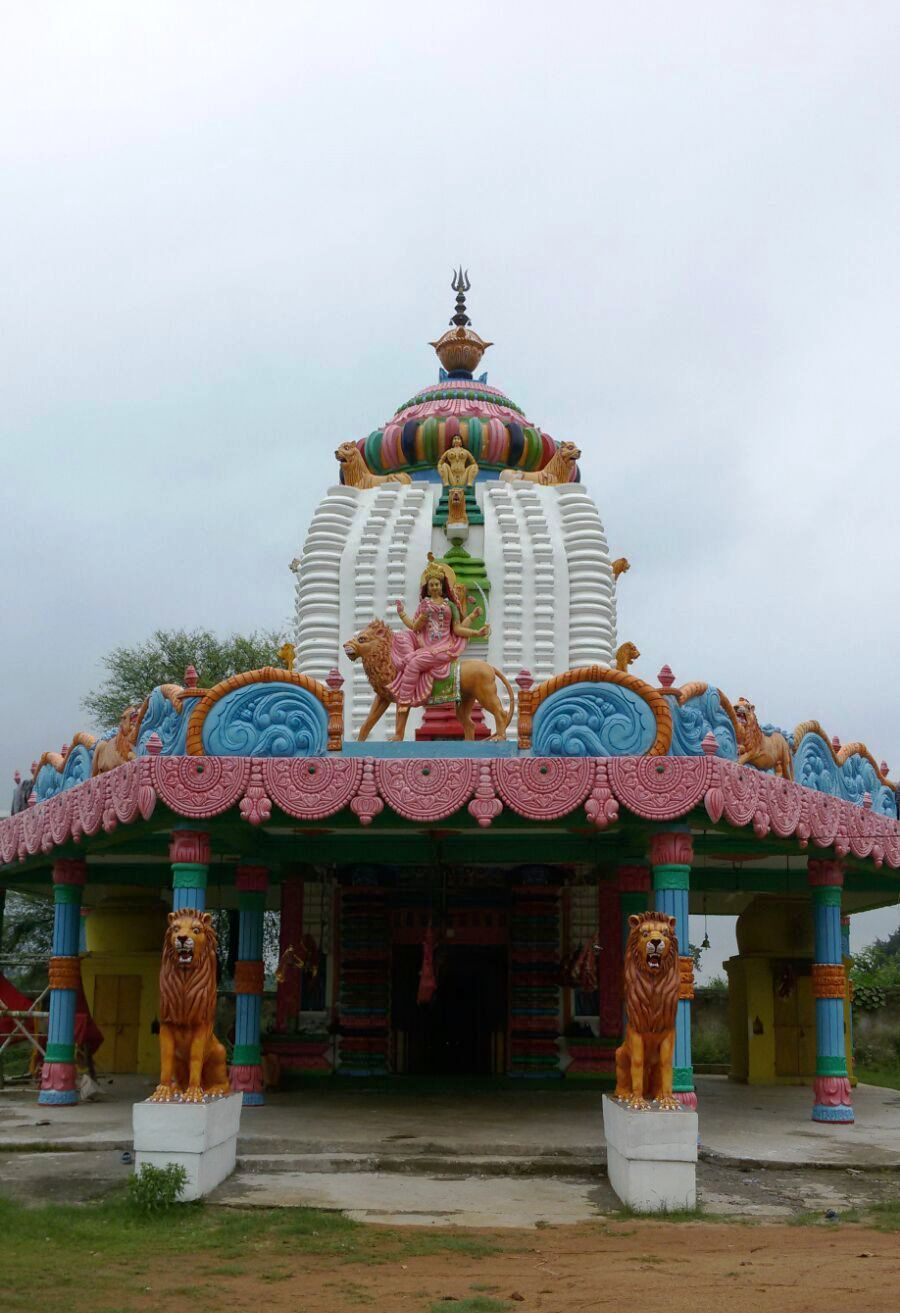
Durga Temple

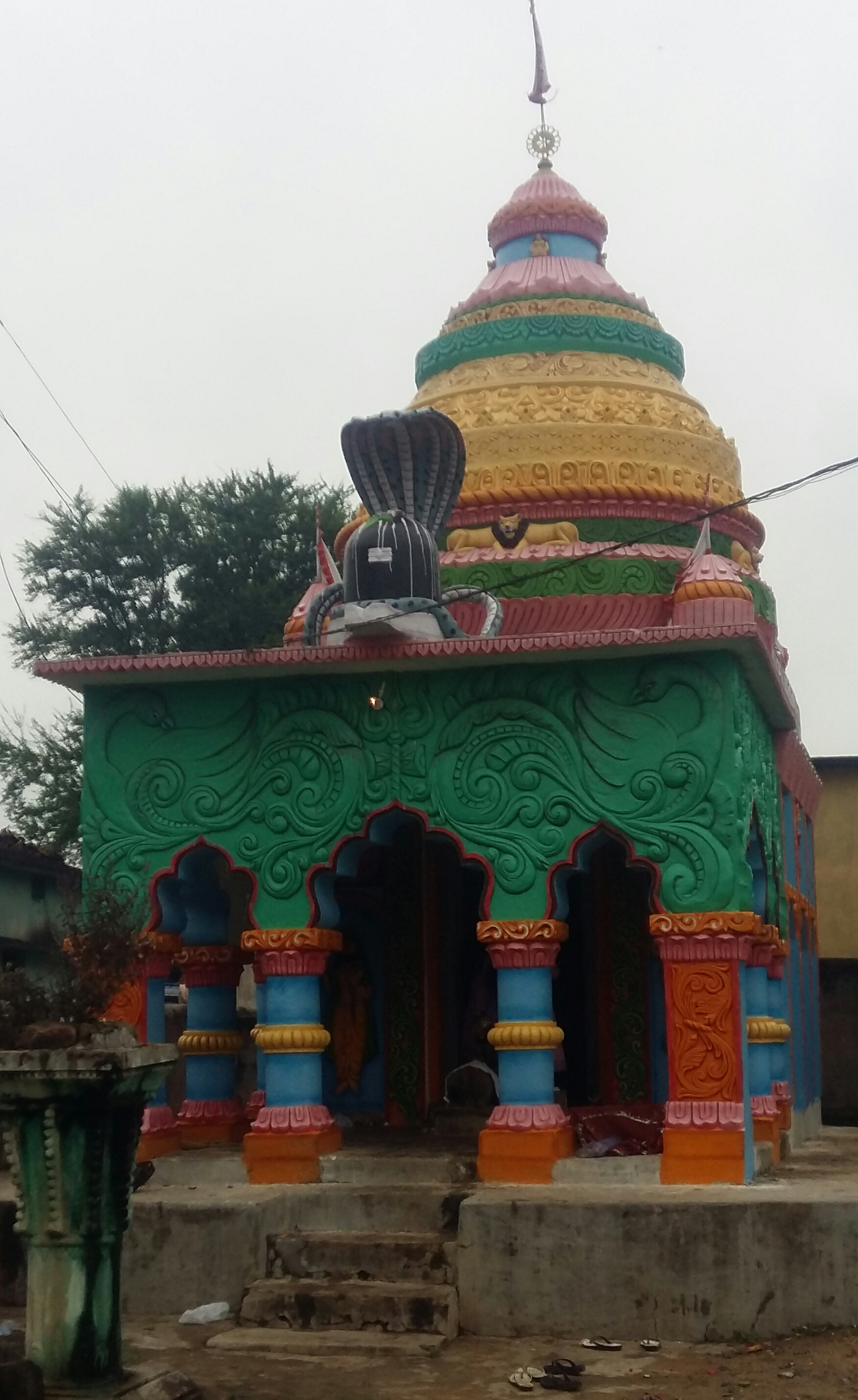
Shiva Temple

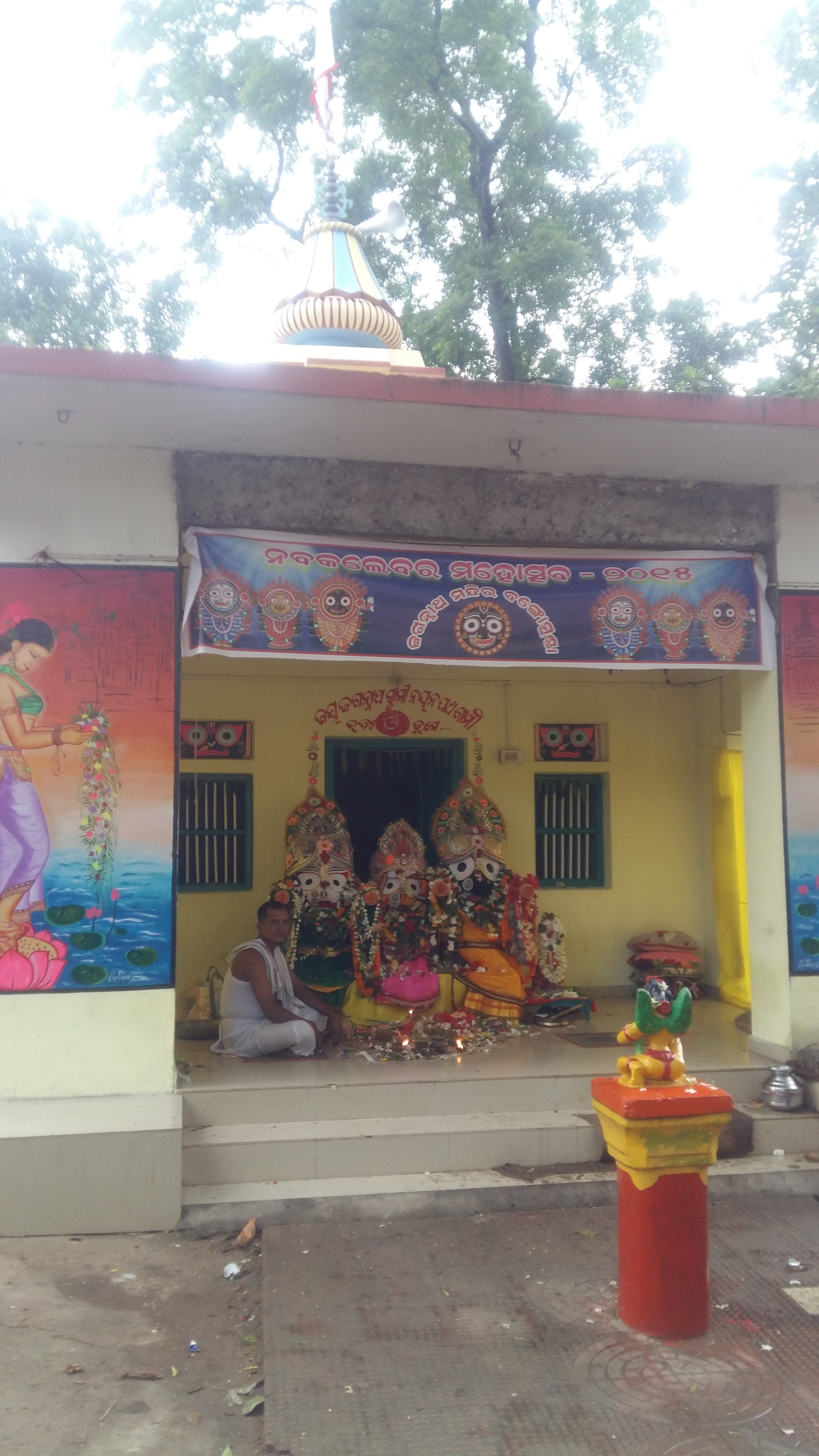
Jagannath Temple
