= Khariar Road =

- Town
- Location in Odisha, India Khariar Road (India) Khariar Road (Asia) Khariar Road (Earth)
- Coordinates: 20.899°N 82.509°E
- Country: India
- State: Odisha
- District: Nuapada

Government
  - Type: Notified Area Council (NAC)
  - MP: Malvika devi (BJP)
  - MLA: Jay Dholakia (BJP)

Population (2011)
  - Total: 16,629

Languages
  - Official: Odia, English
- Time zone: UTC+5:30 (IST)
- PIN: 766104
- Telephone code: 06678
- Vehicle registration: OD
- Website: odisha.gov.in

Khariar Road is a town in India's Odisha state. It is located at the Odisha-Chhattisgarh border. It is 110 km (68 mi) from Raipur, capital of Chhattisgarh and is one of the fastest growing economic centers of Odisha. It is also one of the key railway stations of the East Coast Railway.

== Topography ==
Khariar Road is on a vast plain land with very slight variations in land level. It has one river named Jonk, which a tributary of Mahanadi. Most of the town gets its water supply from this river. Khariar Road is surrounded by some small mountains, part of the Eastern Ghats. The land here has medium range fertility and most of the farmers here prefer to grow rice. Overall, it has a good topography, but in the summer, it faces water scarcity as the river level decreases.

== Economic condition ==
In the last 15 to 20 years, Khariar Road has grown to become one of the most growing economic and business hubs in Nuapada. As it is near the border of Chhattisgarh and is also just 10 km (6.2 mi) from Nuapada, it has an easy access and transport facility for trading. Most of the businessmen buy their supplies from Mahasamund and Raipur and sell in the market. Most of the people from Nuapada and nearby villages come here and buy their supplies. After the development of its railway station, its economy has grown.

== Demographics ==
According to the 2011 Census of India, Khariar Road had a population of 16,629. Males constituted 51% of the population and females 49%. Khariar Road had an average literacy rate of 61%, higher than the national average of 59.5%; male literacy was 70% and female literacy 51%. In Khariar Road, 14% of the population was under 6 years of age.

== Schools ==
- Delhi Public School
- Navjyoti Vidyalaya
- Gopobandhu High School
- Saraswati Vidya Mandir
- Gurukul ashram
- Gurunanak public school
- Gyanjyoti kr vidlaya
- KG Sharaff Public school
- Dattatraya High school
- GOVT PUPS BANKA
- Chandra Public School
