= Patnagarh =

- Town/City
- Location in Odisha, India Patnagarh (India) Patnagarh (Asia) Patnagarh (Earth)
- Coordinates: 20.72°N 83.15°E
- Country: India
- State: Odisha
- District: Bolangir
- Founder: Ramai Deva or Ramai Deo

Government
  - Type: Notified Area Council
  - MP: Sangeeta Kumari Singh Deo
  - MLA: Kanak Vardhan Singh Deo
- Elevation: 243 m (797 ft)

Population (2005)
  - Total: 25,784
- Demonym: Patnagarhia

Languages
  - Official: Odia English
- Time zone: UTC+5:30 (IST)
- Postal code: 767025
- Vehicle registration: OD 03
- Website: odisha.gov.in

Patnagarh is a town and a Notified Area Council in Bolangir district in the Indian state of Odisha. Its original name (with diacritics) is Patnāgarh, and it is pronounced verbally as Patnāgad. The official language is Odia. Patnagarh bears historical significance as it was the epicentre of power in middle age. Patnagarh was the capital of 18 garh that come under south Koshal. In 12th century AD the progenies of the famous King of Delhi, Prithviraj Chauhan came and settled down in Patnagarh. They came here because Mohammad Ghori defeated Prithviraj Chauhan in 2nd battle of Tarai in 1193. The first child of the royal scion who ruled Patnagarh as per recorded history was Ramai Deo. However after 16th century onwards when Balangir and Sambalpur came in to being, the city lost its charm.

== Geography ==
Patnagarh is located at 20.72°N 83.15°E. It has an average elevation of 243 metres (797 feet). Patnagarh is one of the towns in Patnagarh Tehsil, Balangir District, Odisha State. Patnagarh is located about 36 km (22 mi) from its district's main city Balangir and around 350 km (220 mi) away from its state capital Bhubaneswar.

== Demographics ==
As of 2001 India census, Patnagarh had a population of 45445. Males constitute 51% of the population and females 49%. Patnagarh has an average literacy rate of 67%, higher than the national average of 59.5%: male literacy is 76%, and female literacy is 57%. In Patnagarh, 11% of the population is under 6 years of age.

== Politics ==
Current MLA from Patnagarh Assembly Constituency is K V Singh Deo, representing the BJP who won the seat in State elections in 2024 defeating Saroj K Meher of the BJD. Previous MLAs from this seat were Saroj K Meher BJD 2019, Bibekandanda Meher who won this seat representing JD in 1990 and representing JNP in 1977, Sushil Kumar Prushty of INC in 1985, and Brajamohan Thankur of INC(I) in 1980.

Patnagarh is part of Bolangir (Lok Sabha constituency).

== Education ==
The city has good educational institutions, such as Jawaharlal College (co -edu), Ramai boys high school, Govt. girls high school, Govt. girls school, Govt. boys school, C.T training school, Lions Vocational public school, Saraswati shishu vidya mandir, Odisha State Brigade School, Sri Aurobindo Integral Education Centre Omm International School Vidyashree Vidyapeeth Vidya vikash Academy And other Primary schools are also present. It has a Sub-divisional Jail too.

== Notable people ==
- Bhajju Shyam, artist.
- Subroto Bagchi, entrepreneur, author.

== See also ==
- Patnagarh bombing
