= Godhaneswar temple =

Godhaneswar
- Village
- Country: India
- State: Odisha
- District: Subarnapur
- Named for: "Lord of cows"

Area
  - Total: 0.53643 km^{2} (0.20712 sq mi)

Languages
  - Official: Oriya
- Time zone: UTC+5:30 (IST)
- Vehicle registration: OD
- Website: odisha.gov.in

Godhaneswar temple is located on the bank of river Mahanadi in the Godhaneswar village. The name Godhaneswar means lord of cows. It is a very famous Shiva temple of Birmaharajpur subdisvison of Subarnapur district, Odisha.

This temple is very famous in this region and attracts devotees throughout the year. Prof. Sadhu Charan Panda, during the survey for his doctoral research could locate three Naga images in the serpentine form in Western Odisha and have cited about six Naga images in their theriomorphic representation in entire Odisha. One of such stone Naga image in the theriomorphic form is found at this temple. This temple is also mentioned in the book "Glimpses of tribal and folk culture" as an important Siva temple of this region.

During kartik purnima and other festivals people of Gariamunda, Pitamahul, Durdura, Duleswar, Tebhapadar, Sangrampur, Amsarbhata, Subalaya, Etktal and other nearby villages come to worship the lord Godhaneswar.
