= Mahanadi Bridge, Boudh =

Bridge in Odisha, India

Mahanadi Bridge, Boudh Kiakata Bridge
- Coordinates: 20°51′31″N 84°18′36″E
- Carries: Road
- Crosses: Mahanadi River
- Locale: Boudh-Kiakata, NH 153B

Characteristics
- Material: RCC
- Total length: 1,858.66 metres (6,098.0 ft)
- Width: 10.5 metres (34 ft)
- No. of spans: 74

History
- Construction start: 22 April 1998
- Opened: 31 December 2002

Location
- Interactive map of Mahanadi Bridge, Boudh

Mahanadi Bridge, Boudh (Odia: ମହାନଦୀ ସେତୁ) connects Kiakata and Boudh in Odisha. This bridge over river Mahanadi is facilitating communication between Sambalpur, Rairakhol, Kadligarh, Birmaharajpur, and Subalaya with Boudh town. It is the second biggest bridge in Odisha. The work on this bridge was started on 22.04.1998 and completed on 31.12.2002. The 1858.66 meters long bridge carries National Highway 153B

== Gallery ==
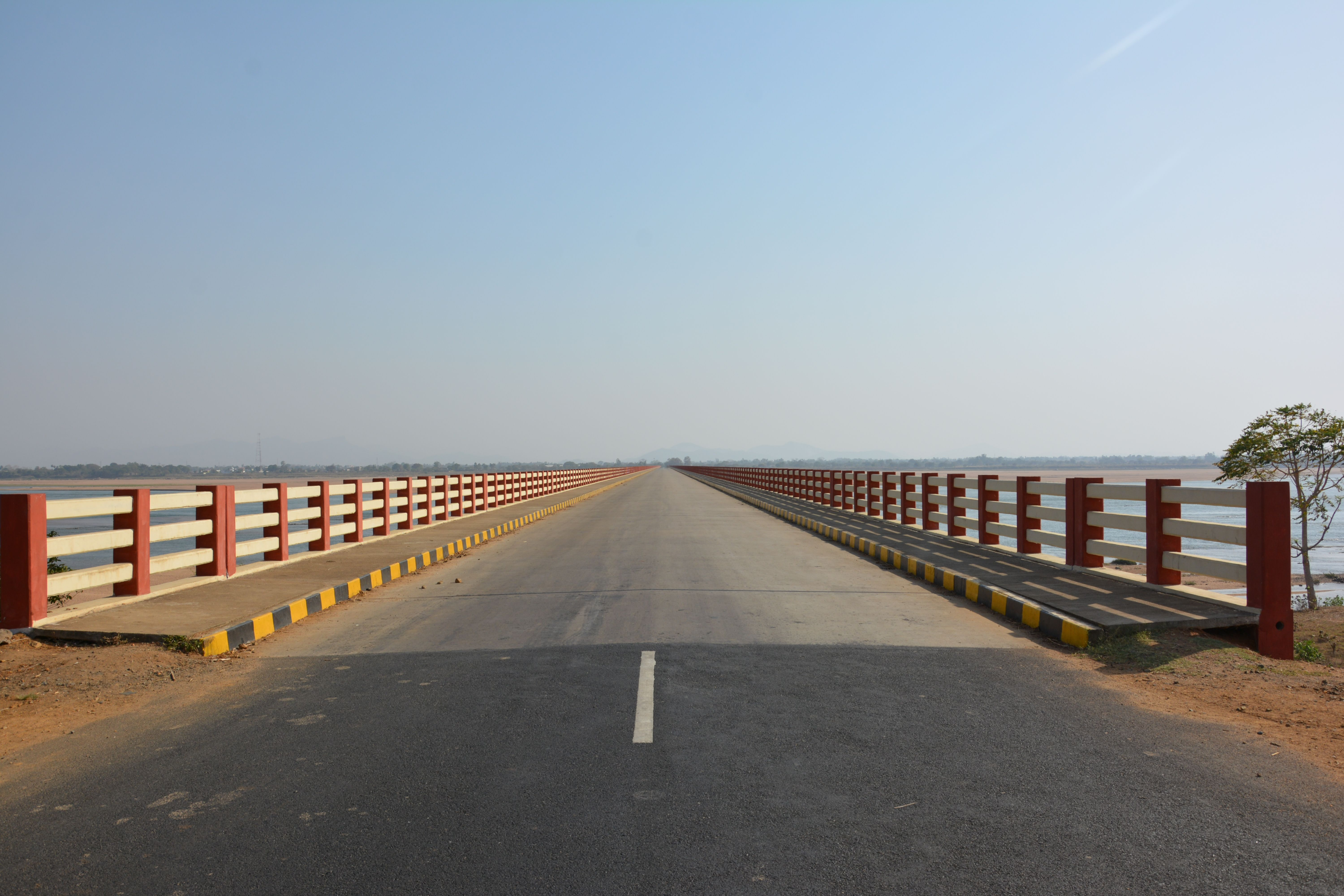
second biggest bridge in Odisha

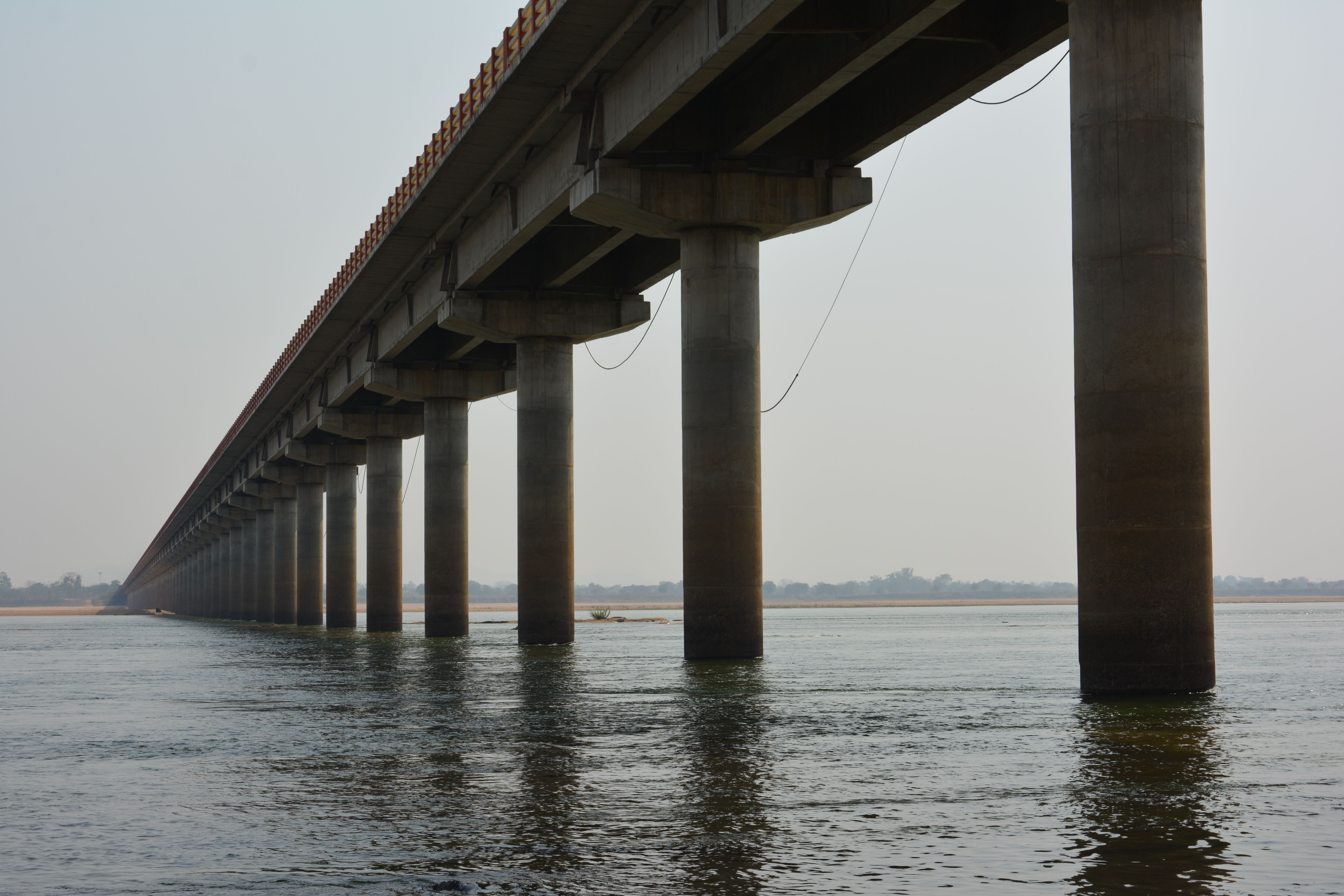
second biggest bridge in Odisha

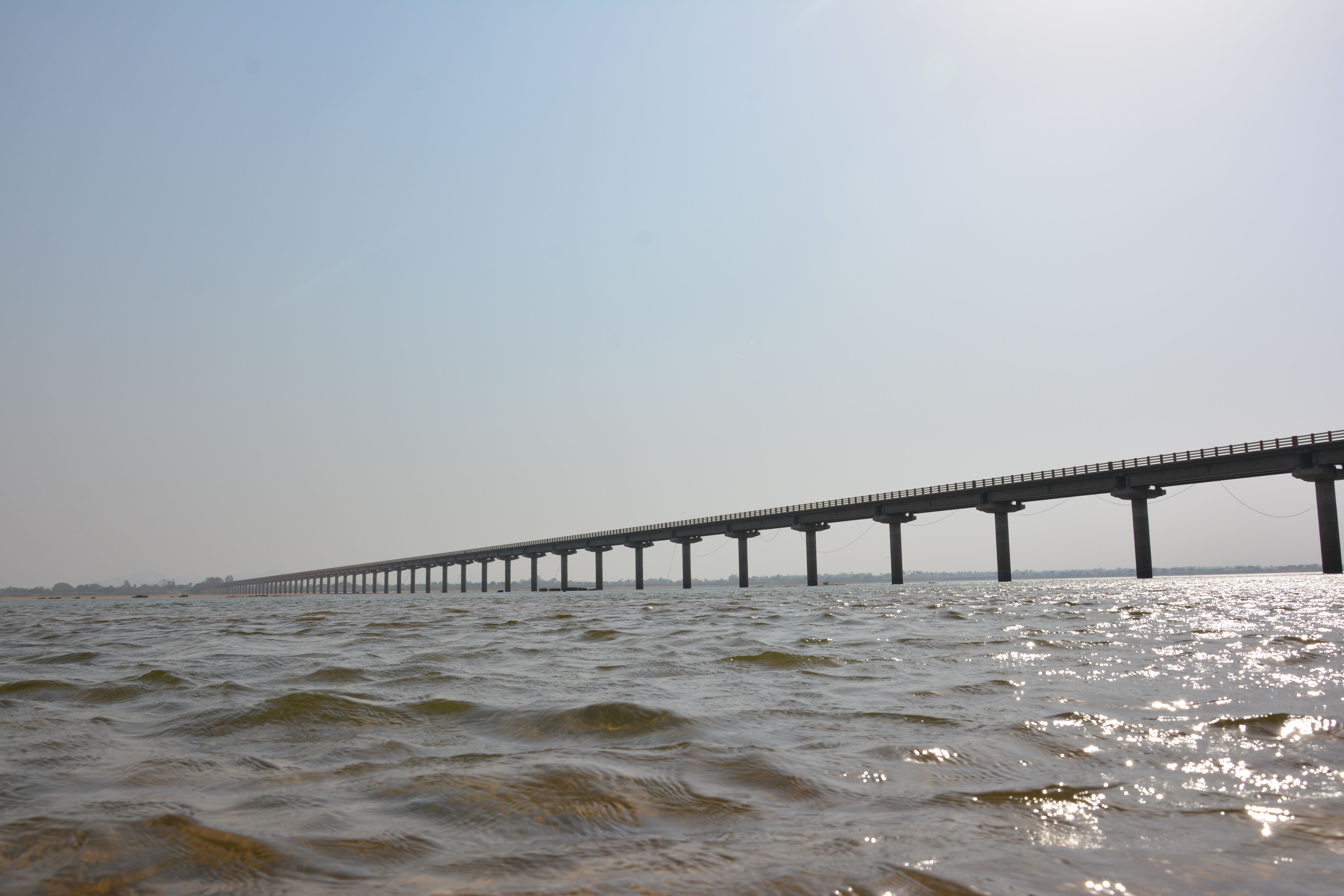
second biggest bridge in Odisha

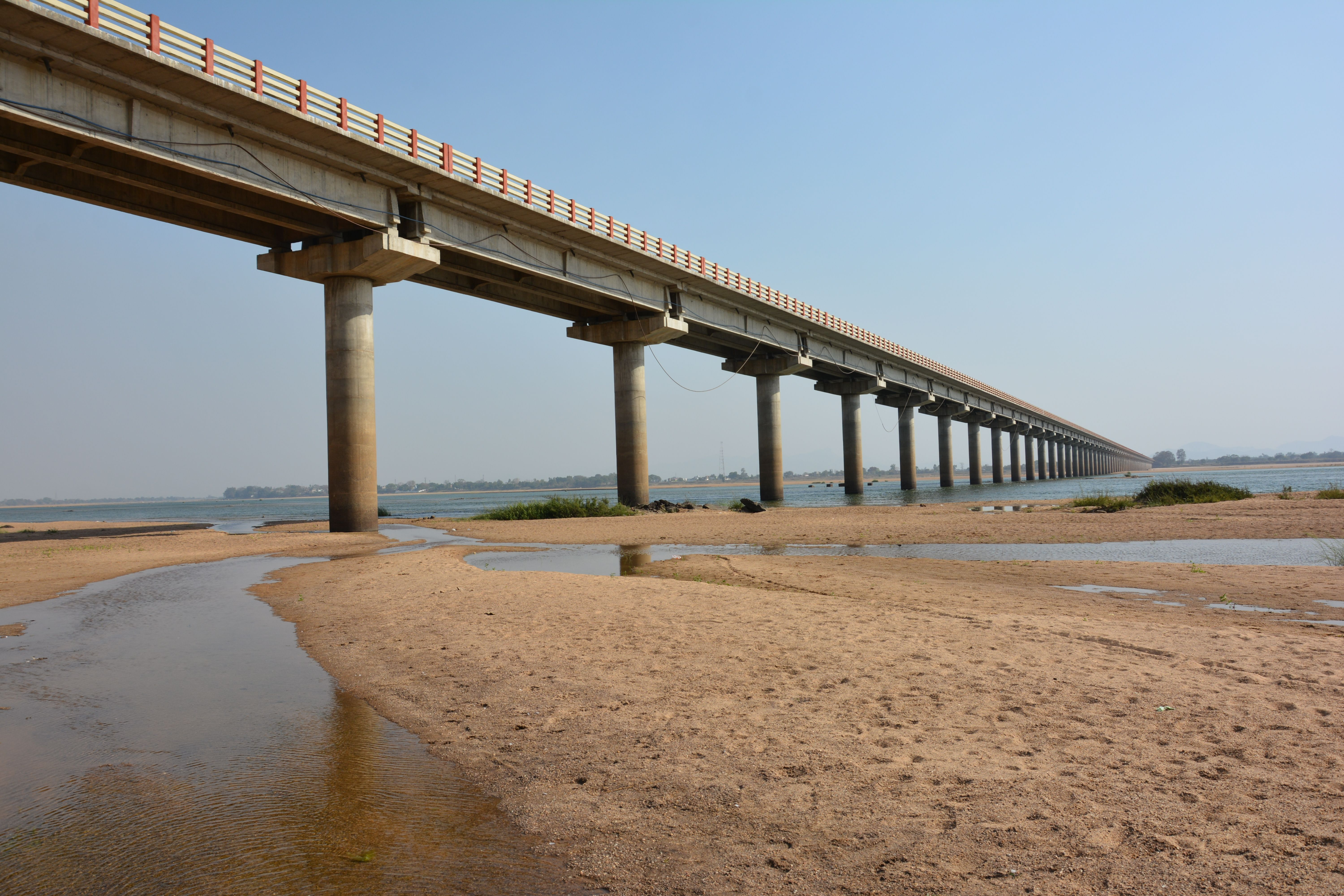
second biggest bridge in Odisha
