= Durdura =

- Village
- Location in Odisha, India Durdura (India)
- Coordinates: 20°09′40″N 85°02′05″E
- Country: India
- State: Odisha
- District: Subarnapur

Area
  - Total: 0.70950 km^{2} (0.27394 sq mi)

Languages
  - Official: Odia
- Time zone: UTC+5:30 (IST)
- Vehicle registration: OD
- Website: odisha.gov.in

Durdura is a village in the Pitamahul gram panchayat of Birmaharajpur subdivision, Subarnapur district, Odisha, India. It is located on the side of the road connecting Birmaharajpur and Rairakhol town. The total area of this village is 175.321 acres (0.70950 km^{2}). The Baurijore and Mahanadi rivers flow close to the village.
