= Gariamunda =

Village in Odisha, India

Coordinates: 20.908905°N 84.259117°E

Gariamunda is a village of Pitamahul gram panchayat of Birmaharajpur subdivision, Subarnapur district, Odisha, India. It is located on the side of the road connecting Birmaharajpur and Rairakhol town.
