= Pitamahul =

Coordinates: 20°20′N 85°09′E

Pitamahul is a gram panchayat of Birmaharajpur subdivision of Subarnapur district, Odisha, India. It is located on the bank of river Mahanadi and on the side of the road connecting Birmaharajpur and Rairakhol town. Durdura, Tebhapadar, Amsarbhata and Subalaya are the nearby village of Pitamahul.

== Super critical thermal power plant, Pitamahul ==
KU Projects Pvt Ltd. will set up a 1,320 MW (2X660MW) coal fired supercritical thermal power plant at Pitamahul, and Tebhapadar region with a total investment of ₹ 7260 crore. A MoU was already signed between the company and the Odisha government.
