= Education in Subarnapur district =

Subarnapur district or Sonepur district of Odisha is a part of Kalahandi Balangir Koraput region. This district does not have any universities or postgraduate level educational institution. In addition, there are no medical and engineering colleges in Subarnapur district. Following are the colleges, high schools, primary schools and Saraswati vidyamandir present in Subarnapur district. According to a recent report there are 654 primary schools, 212 ME schools, 100 high schools and 8 colleges in Subarnapur district.

== Colleges ==
- Sonepur College
- PS College, Ulunda
- Birmaharajpur College
- Dunguripali College, Dunguripali
- Subalaya College, Subalaya
- A.E.S.College, Tarbha, Tarbha
- Sidhartha College, Binka
- Dharmasala College, Dharmasala
- Bhutiapali College, Bhutiapali
- Biju Pattnaik Women's College, Sonepur
- Bal Gangadhar Tilak Law College, Sonepur
- Binka Women's College, Phulmuti, Binka
- M.B.R. College, Menda
- Maa Maheshwari College, Kham
- Kingpin Institute of Hotel Management, Sonepur

== High schools ==
- Anchalik Uchha Vidya Pitha, Kenjhiriapali
- Panchayat High School, Narayanpur
- Maharaja High School, Sonepur
- Birmaharajpur Boys' High School
- Ulunda High School, Ulunda
- Dharmasala High School, Dharmasala
- Subalaya High School, Subalaya
- Kamira High School
- Jatesinga High School
- Jay Jagannath High School, Sialjuli
- Amarpali High School, Amarpali (with school hostel)
- Panchayat High School, Nimna
- Sri Ganesh High School, Pachamahala
