= Mahima =

Mahima may refer to:

- Mahima Dharma, also known as Mahima Panth, a Hindu sect practiced primarily in Odisha and nearby states
- Mahima Chaudhry, Indian actress
- Mahima Makwana, Indian actress
- Mahima Nambiar, Indian actress
