= Surubalijora =

Coordinates: 20°50′N 83°54′E

Surubalijora or Surubalijore is a small river (Jora or Jore) located in the Subalaya area of Birmaharajpur subdivision of Subarnapur district of Odisha, India. It originates from a mountain and merges with the Mahanadi river near Subalaya, Tebhapadar and Ambasarabhata. It had created a small delta at the meeting place. Near this delta, the land is fertile and farmers from nearby villages cultivate various vegetables.

The Odisha Bridge and Construction Corporation Limited has constructed a bridge over Surubalijore near Subalaya and Kamira village. This bridge plays a vital role in connecting various town viz. Rairakhol, Boudh, Subalaya, Birmaharajpur, Dharmasala, Sonepur and Sambalpur. it is the largest jore of Odisha.
