= Stuticintamani =

The Stuti Chintamani is a piece of devotional literature attributed to Mahima Dharma. The song was written by Bhima Bhoi.

== Lyrics ==
Oh preceptor, oh Lord, You are beyond the scope of description by qualification. I am going down now. Kindly tell me the way. (1)Oh shapeless Lord, You are without any desire, but I am with desire. Save me from the delusion and deluge.
(2) Oh preceptor, oh Lord, You are above the Vedas, but I am confined to the Vedas. Kindly tell me divine wisdom so that I will get rid of the sins of nature.
(3) Oh preceptor, oh Lord, You are beyond the Vedas, but I bear a shape. You take ablution in the Ganges water but I take bath in the well-water of this earth.
(4) Oh Lord of the void, You have got one foot but I have two. Rescue me with Your single foot.
(5) My preceptor is free of sins but I am a great sinner. Oh Lord, rescue me from sins and do not deceive me.
(6) Oh preceptor, oh Lord, You are intelligent but I am a fool. Knowing fully well the merits have some kindness for me.
(7) Oh preceptor, oh Lord, You are a store house of knowledge and I am ignorant. Kindly rescue me from this dangerous Kali Age.
(8) Oh preceptor, oh Lord, You are expert in rescuing and I am fit for being condemned. You can save me from sixty six thousand Kumvi hell in which one has fallen by dragging him.
(9) Oh omniscient Lord, knowing in Your heart which is full of kindness that the creatures has fallen in the mire of sins, rescue him.
(10) Oh preceptor, oh Lord, You are free of diseases and I am full of diseases. Your religion is that of the void and You are endowed with all beauty. This creature is very unfortunate.
(11) Oh preceptor oh Lord, You have no companion or friend, but I am in coupe. As soon as I assumed body, delusion is sticking to my skin and hairs of the skin.
(12) Oh Alekha God, you are my illustrious preceptor and I am your disciple. I am being drowned, save me. What more I will tell you.
(13) My good preceptor is very virtuous, and I am a great sinner. Kindly see my condition and save me from the earth which is like an ocean. My preceptor is the fathomless sea of kindness. His religion is called Mahima. It is not even known to the wise as well as to the Vedas.
(15) The Lord has no shape or form. Then how to meditate on Him. Or Lord, you give result without performance of my religious rites.
(16) You are unthinkable. Your body is of the void. You cannot be described in words. Who can get any trace of Him by means of the holy lores.
(17) Oh pious and wise men, you are poet and learned men. Think within yourself. In this great Kali Age follow Alekha Mahima night and day.
(18) This religion has been evolved in this age and there is no importance in any other religion. One will get deliverance, wealth etc. by adopting this religion.
(19) This is Kali Age; from day to day Kali Age is assuming great proportion in the matter of sins. Following the feet of the preceptor Bhima Kanda has composed up until now 900 stanzas.

== See also ==
- Mahima Dharma
- Bhima Bhoi
