= Idolatry =

Worship of an idol as though it were a god

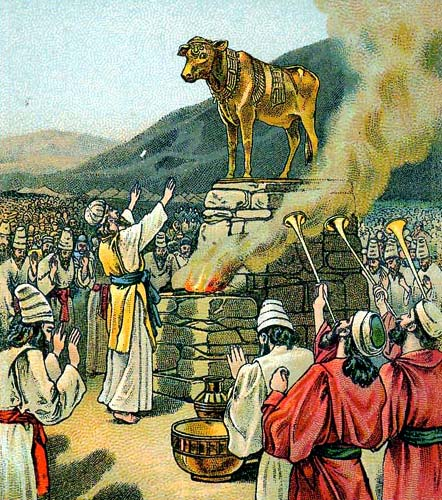
Illustration depicting worship of the golden calf idol

Idolatry is the worship of an idol as though it were a deity. In this context, the term idol, usually pejorative in English, is an image or representation of a god used as an object of worship. The term is often associated with Abrahamic religions (namely Judaism, Christianity, and Islam), where idolatry connotes the worship of something or someone other than the Abrahamic God.

In these monotheistic religions, idolatry has been considered as the 'worship of false gods' and is forbidden by texts such as the Ten Commandments. Other monotheistic religions may apply similar rules. For instance, the phrase false god is a derogatory term used in Abrahamic religions to indicate cult images or deities of non-Abrahamic religions, as well as other competing entities or objects to which particular importance is attributed. Conversely, followers of animistic and polytheistic religions may regard the gods of various monotheistic religions as "false gods" because they do not believe that any real deity possesses the properties ascribed by monotheists to their sole deity. Atheists, who do not believe in any deities, do not usually use the term false god even though that would encompass all deities from the atheist viewpoint. Usage of this term is generally limited to theists, who choose to worship some deity or deities, but not others.

The opposition to the use of any icon or image to represent ideas of reverence or worship is called aniconism. The destruction of images as icons of veneration is called iconoclasm, and this has long been accompanied with violence between religious groups that forbid idol worship and those who have accepted icons, images and statues for veneration. The definition of idolatry has been a contested topic within Abrahamic religions, with many Muslims and most Protestant Christians condemning the Catholic and Eastern Orthodox practice of venerating the Virgin Mary in many churches as a form of idolatry.

In the traditional religions of Ancient Egypt, Greece, Rome, Africa, Asia, the Americas and elsewhere, the reverence of cult images or statues has been a common practice since antiquity, and they have carried different meanings and significance in the history of religion; similarly, in many Dharmic religions, like Hinduism, Buddhism, and Jainism, cult images known as murti are used for symbolism for the Absolute, of spiritual ideas, or the embodiment of the divine, as a means to focus one's religious pursuits and worship (bhakti). Moreover, the material depiction of a deity or more deities has always played an eminent role in all cultures of the world. Thus, ever since the emergence of Abrahamic and other monotheist religions; the history of religions has been marked with accusations and denials of idolatry. These accusations have considered statues and images to be devoid of symbolism. Alternatively, the topic of idolatry has been a source of disagreements between many religions, or within denominations of various religions, with the presumption that icons of one's own religious practices have meaningful symbolism, while another person's different religious practices do not.

== Etymology and nomenclature ==
The term idolatry comes from the Ancient Greek word eidololatria (εἰδωλολατρία), which itself is a compound of two words: eidolon (εἴδωλον "image/idol") and latreia (λατρεία "worship", related to λάτρις). The word eidololatria thus means "worship of idols", which in Latin appears first as idololatria, then in Vulgar Latin as idolatria, therefrom it appears in 12th century Old French as idolatrie, which for the first time in mid 13th century English appears as "idolatry".

Although the Greek appears to be a loan translation of the Hebrew phrase avodat elilim, (עבודת אלילים) which is attested in rabbinic literature (e.g., bChul., 13b, Bar.), the Greek term itself is not found in the Septuagint, Philo, Josephus, or in other Hellenistic Jewish writings. The original term used in early rabbinic writings is oved avodah zarah (AAZ, worship in strange service, or "pagan"), while avodat kochavim umazalot (AKUM, worship of planets and constellations) is not found in its early manuscripts. The later Jews used the term עֲבוֹדָה זָרָה, avodah zarah, meaning "foreign worship".

Idolatry has also been called idolism, iconolatry or idolodulia in historic literature.

== Religions opposed to idolatry ==
=== Judaism ===
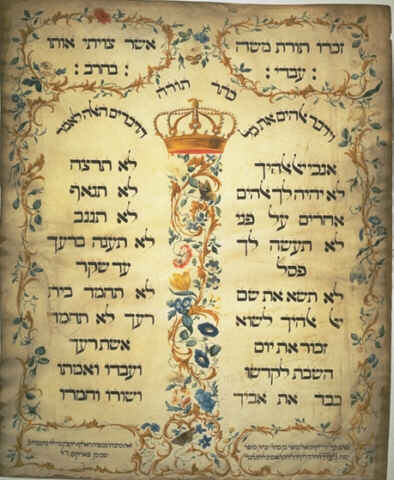
A 1768 synagogue parchment with the Ten Commandments by Jekuthiel Sofer. Among other things, it prohibits idolatry.

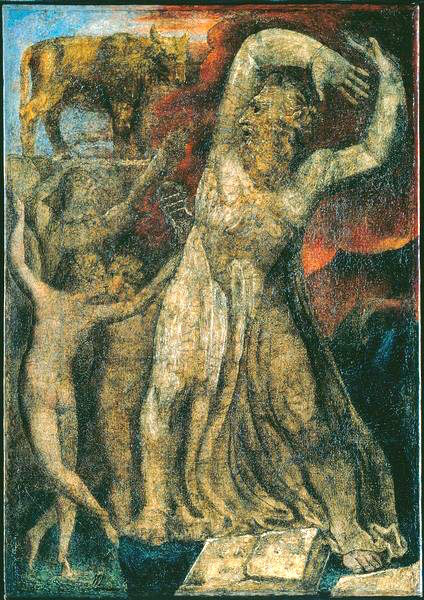
Moses Indignant at the Golden Calf, painting by William Blake, 1799–1800

Judaism prohibits any form of idolatry even if they are used to worship the one God of Judaism as occurred during the sin of the golden calf. According to the second commandment of the decalogue, Thou shalt not make unto thee any graven image. The worship of foreign gods in any form or through icons is not allowed.

Many Jewish scholars such as Rabbi Saadia Gaon, Rabbi Bahya ibn Paquda, and Rabbi Yehuda Halevi have elaborated on the issues of idolatry. One of the oft-cited discussions is the commentary of Rabbi Moshe ben Maimon (Maimonides) on idolatry. According to the Maimonidean interpretation, idolatry in itself is not a fundamental sin, but the grave sin is the denial of God's omnipresence that occurs with the belief that God can be corporeal. In the Jewish belief, man was created in the likeness of God, but God has no visible shape, and it is absurd to make or worship images; instead man must worship the invisible God alone.

The commandments in the Hebrew Bible against idolatry forbade the practices and gods of ancient Akkad, Mesopotamia, and Egypt. The Hebrew Bible states that God has no shape or form, is utterly incomparable, is everywhere and cannot be represented in a physical form of an idol.

Biblical scholars have historically focused on the textual evidence to construct the history of idolatry in Judaism, a scholarship that post-modern scholars have increasingly begun deconstructing. This biblical polemics, states Naomi Janowitz, a professor of Religious Studies, has distorted the reality of Israelite religious practices and the historic use of images in Judaism. The direct material evidence is more reliable, such as that from the archaeological sites, and this suggests that the Jewish religious practices have been far more complex than what biblical polemics suggest. Judaism included images and cultic statues in the First Temple period, the Second Temple period, late antiquity (2nd to 8th century CE), and thereafter. Nonetheless, these sorts of evidence may be simply descriptive of Ancient Israelite practices in some—possibly deviant—circles, but cannot tell us anything about the mainstream religion of the Bible which proscribes idolatry.

The history of Jewish religious practice has included idols and figurines made of ivory, terracotta, faience and seals. As more material evidence emerged, one proposal has been that Judaism oscillated between idolatry and iconoclasm. However, the dating of the objects and texts suggest that the two theologies and liturgical practices existed simultaneously. The claimed rejection of idolatry because of monotheism found in Jewish literature and therefore in biblical Christian literature, states Janowitz, has created an unreal abstraction and flawed construction of the actual history. The material evidence of images, statues and figurines taken together with the textual description of cherub and "wine standing for blood", for example, suggests that symbolism, making religious images, icon and index has been integral part of Judaism. Every religion has some objects that represent the divine and stand for something in the mind of the faithful, and Judaism too has had its holy objects and symbols such as Torah scrolls and holy books, Tefillin, the Menorah, mezuzah and many more.

=== Christianity ===
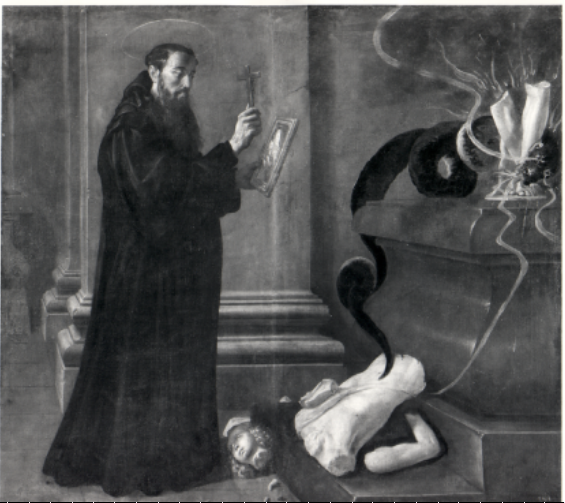
St. Benedict destroying a pagan idol, by Juan Rizi (1600–1681)

Ideas on idolatry in Christianity are based on the first of Ten Commandments:

You shall have no other gods before me.

This is expressed in the Bible in Exodus 20:3, Matthew 4:10, Luke 4:8 and elsewhere.

The Christian view of idolatry may generally be divided into two general categories: the Catholic and Eastern Orthodox view which accepts the use of religious images, and the views of many Protestant churches that considerably restrict their use. However, many Protestants have used the image of the cross as a symbol.

==== Catholicism ====
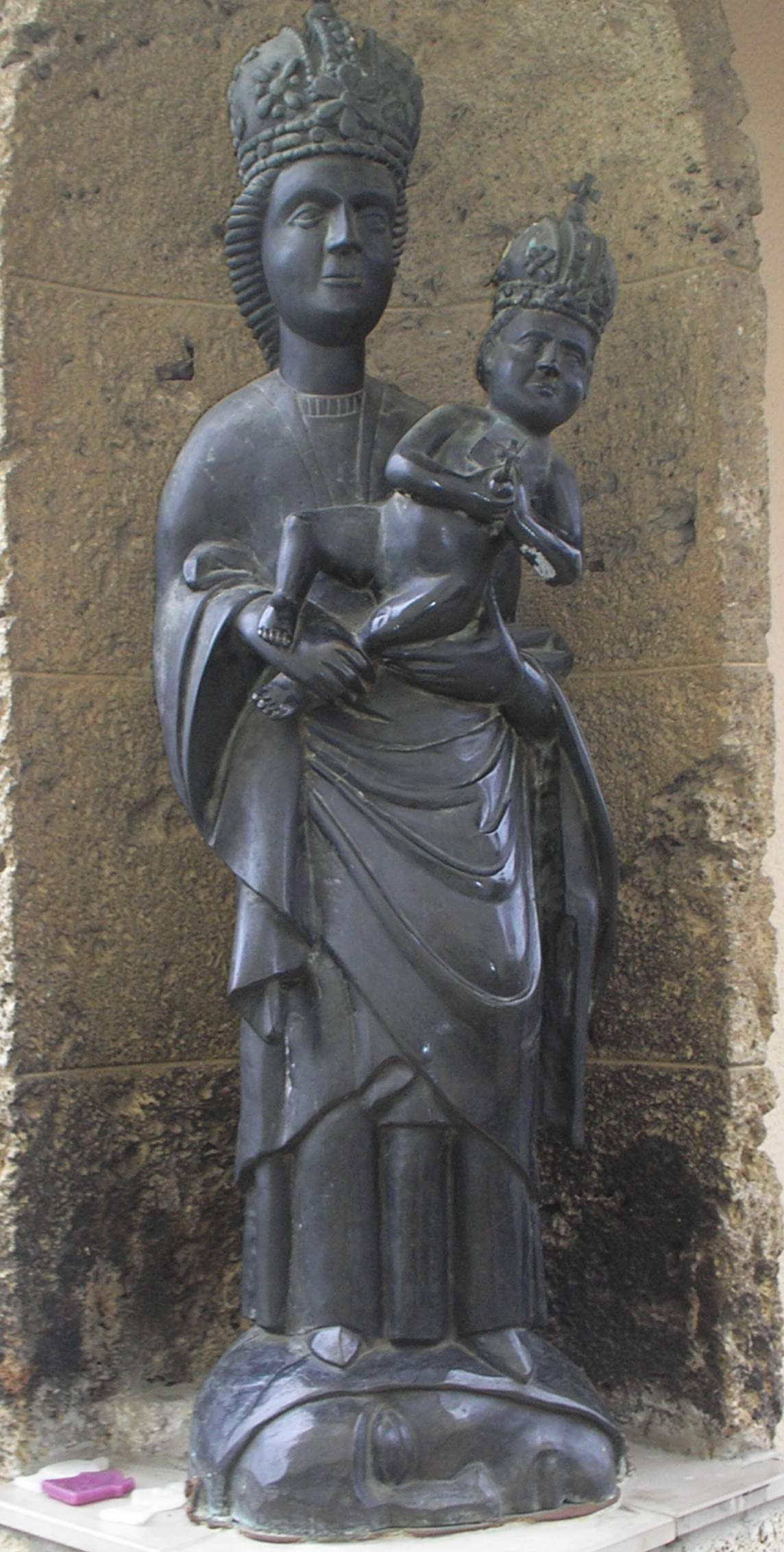
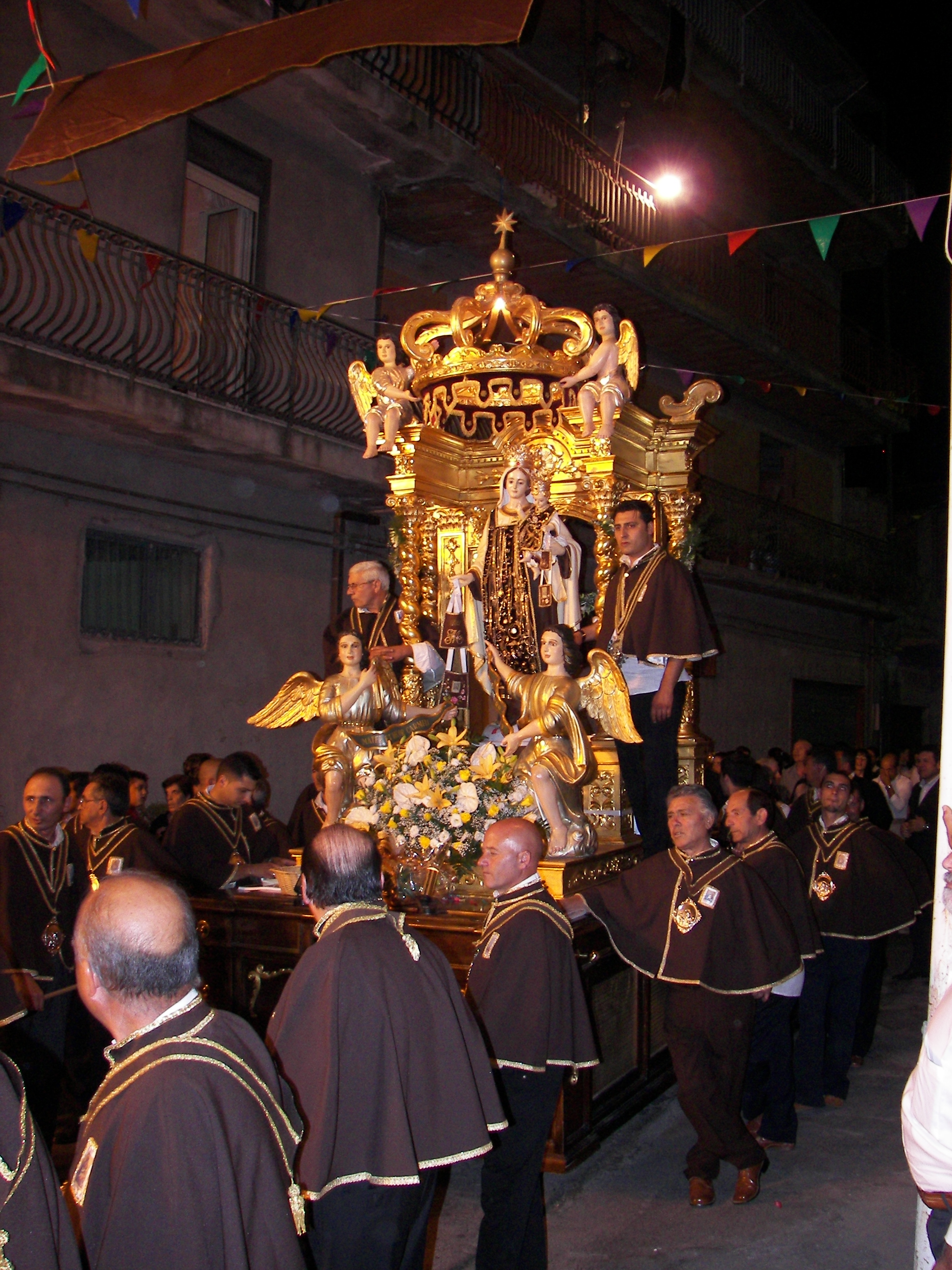
The veneration of Mary, Jesus Christ, and the Black Madonna are common practices in the Catholic Church.

The Catholic Church and the Orthodox Church have traditionally defended the use of icons. The debate on what images signify and whether reverence with the help of icons in church is equivalent to idolatry has lasted for many centuries, particularly from the 7th century until the Reformation in the 16th century. These debates have supported the inclusion of icons of Jesus Christ, the Virgin Mary, and the Apostles, the iconography expressed in stained glass, regional saints and other symbols of Christian faith. It has also supported the practices such as the Catholic mass, burning of candles before pictures, Christmas decorations and celebrations, and festive or memorial processions with statues of religious significance to Christianity.

St. John of Damascus, in his "On the Divine Image", defended the use of icons and images, in direct response to the Byzantine iconoclasm that began widespread destruction of religious images in the 8th century, with support from emperor Leo III and continued by his successor Constantine V during a period of religious war with the invading Umayyads. John of Damascus wrote, "I venture to draw an image of the invisible God, not as invisible, but as having become visible for our sakes through flesh and blood", adding that images are expressions "for remembrance either of wonder, or an honor, or dishonor, or good, or evil" and that a book is also a written image in another form. He defended the religious use of images based on the Christian doctrine of Jesus as an incarnation.

St. John the Evangelist cited John 1:14, stating that "the Word became flesh" indicates that the invisible God became visible, that God's glory manifested in God's one and only Son as Jesus Christ, and therefore God chose to make the invisible into a visible form, the spiritual incarnated into the material form.

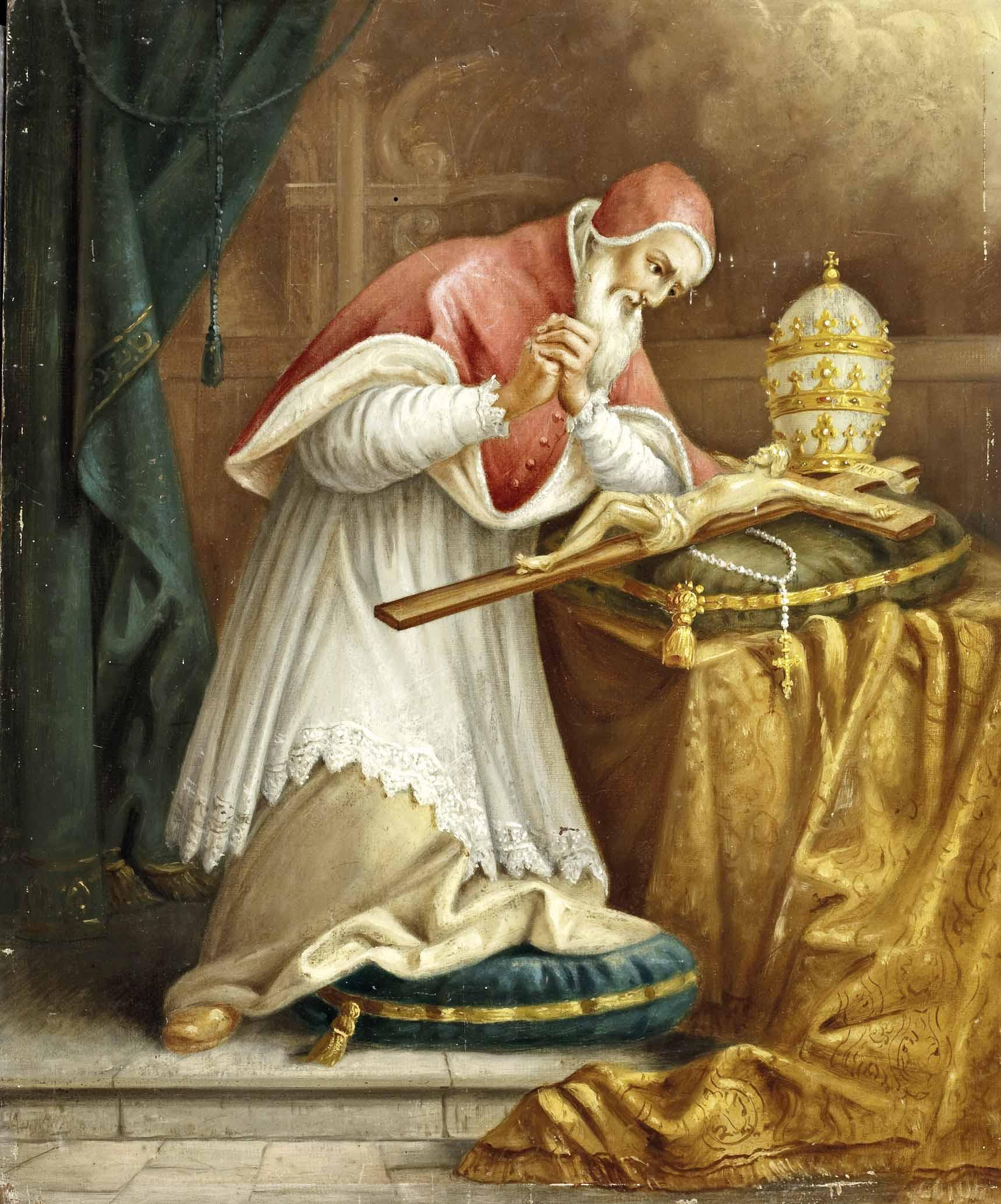
Pope Pius V praying with a crucifix, painting by August Kraus

The early defense of images included exegesis of Old and New Testament. Evidence for the use of religious images is found in Early Christian art and documentary records. For example, the veneration of the tombs and statues of martyrs was common among early Christian communities. In 397 St. Augustine of Hippo, in his Confessions 6.2.2, tells the story of his mother making offerings for the tombs of martyrs and the oratories built in the memory of the saints.

Images function as the Bible
for the illiterate, and
incite people to piety and virtue.

— Pope Gregory I, 7th century

The Catholic defense mentions textual evidence of external acts of honor towards icons, arguing that there is a difference between adoration and veneration and that the veneration shown to icons differs entirely from the adoration of God. Citing the Old Testament, these arguments present examples of forms of "veneration" such as in Genesis 33:3, with the argument that "adoration is one thing, and that which is offered in order to venerate something of great excellence is another". These arguments assert, "the honor given to the image is transferred to its prototype", and that venerating an image of Christ does not terminate at the image itself – the material of the image is not the object of worship – rather it goes beyond the image, to the prototype.

According to the Catechism of the Catholic Church:

The Christian veneration of images is not contrary to the first commandment which proscribes idols. Indeed, "the honor rendered to an image passes to its prototype," and "whoever venerates an image venerates the person portrayed in it." The honor paid to sacred images is a "respectful veneration," not the adoration due to God alone:

Religious worship is not directed to images in themselves, considered as mere things, but under their distinctive aspect as images leading us on to God incarnate. The movement toward the image does not terminate in it as image, but tends toward that whose image it is.

It also points out the following:

Idolatry not only refers to false pagan worship. It remains a constant temptation to faith. Idolatry consists in divinizing what is not God. Man commits idolatry whenever he honors and reveres a creature in place of God, whether this be gods or demons (for example, satanism), power, pleasure, race, ancestors, the state, money, etc.

The manufacture of images of Jesus, the Virgin Mary and Christian saints, along with prayers directed to them has been widespread among the Catholic faithful.

==== Orthodox Church ====
The Eastern Orthodox Church has differentiated between latria and dulia. A latria is the worship due God, and latria to anyone or anything other than God is doctrinally forbidden by the Orthodox Church; however dulia has been defined as veneration of religious images, statues or icons which is not only allowed but obligatory. This distinction was discussed by Thomas Aquinas in section 3.25 of Summa Theologiae.

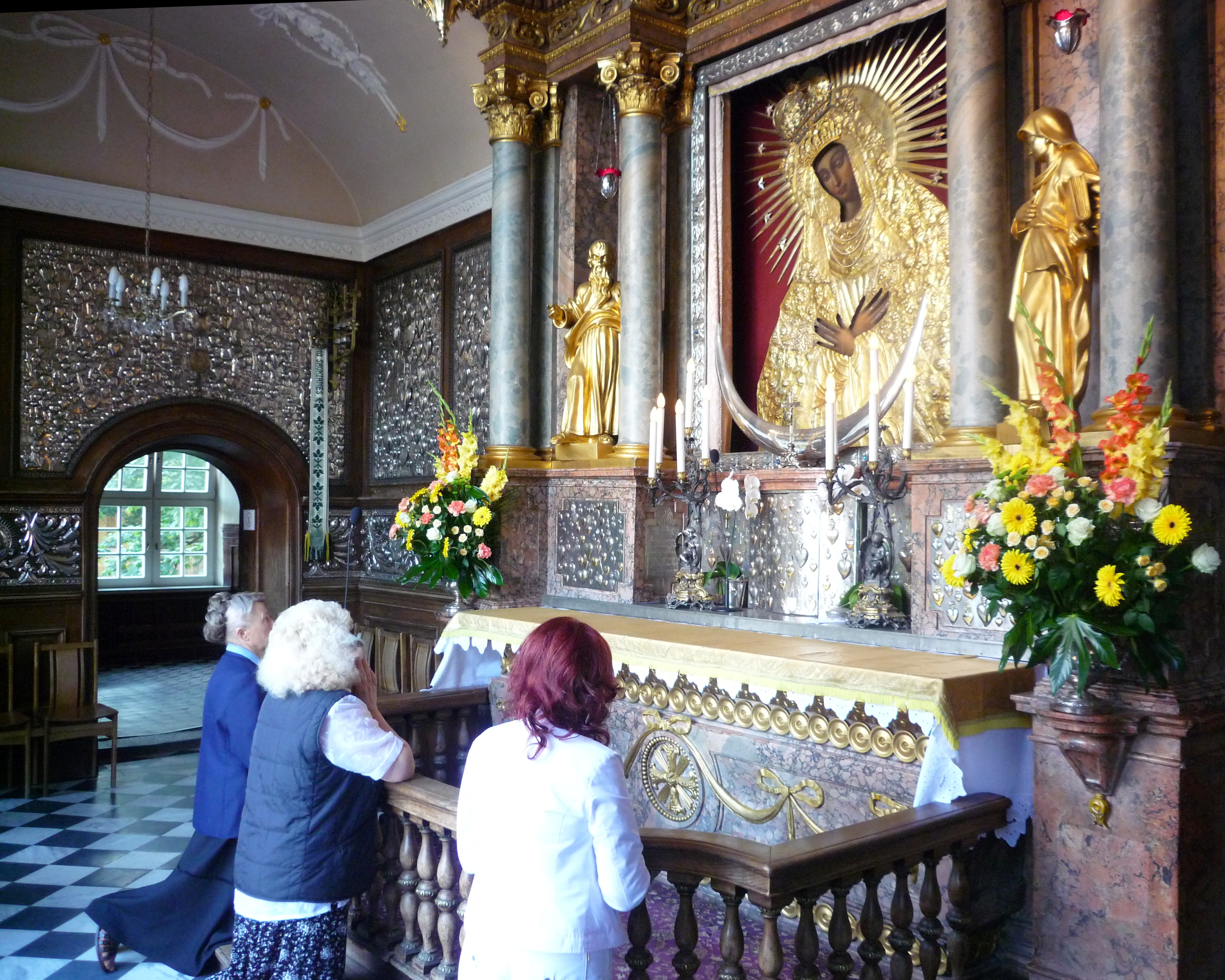
The veneration of images of Mary is called Marian devotion (above: Lithuania), a practice questioned in the majority of Protestant Christianity.

In Orthodox apologetic literature, the proper and improper use of images is extensively discussed. Exegetical Orthodox literature points to icons and the manufacture by Moses (under God's commandment) of the Bronze Snake in Numbers 21:9, which had the grace and power of God to heal those bitten by real snakes. Similarly, the Ark of the Covenant was cited as evidence of the ritual object above which Yahweh was present.

Veneration of icons through proskynesis was codified in 787 AD by the Seventh Ecumenical Council. This was triggered by the Byzantine Iconoclasm controversy that followed raging Christian-Muslim wars and a period of iconoclasm in West Asia. The defense of images and the role of the Syrian scholar John of Damascus was pivotal during this period. The Eastern Orthodox Church has ever since celebrated the use of icons and images. Eastern Rite Catholics also accepts icons in their Divine Liturgy.

==== Protestantism ====
The idolatry debate has been one of the defining differences between papal Catholicism and anti-papal Protestantism. The anti-papal writers have prominently questioned the worship practices and images supported by Catholics, with many Protestant scholars listing it as the "one religious error larger than all others". The sub-list of erring practices have included among other things the veneration of Virgin Mary, the Catholic mass, the invocation of saints, and the reverence expected for and expressed to pope himself. The charges of supposed idolatry against the Roman Catholics were leveled by a diverse group of Protestants, from Anglicans to Calvinists in Geneva.

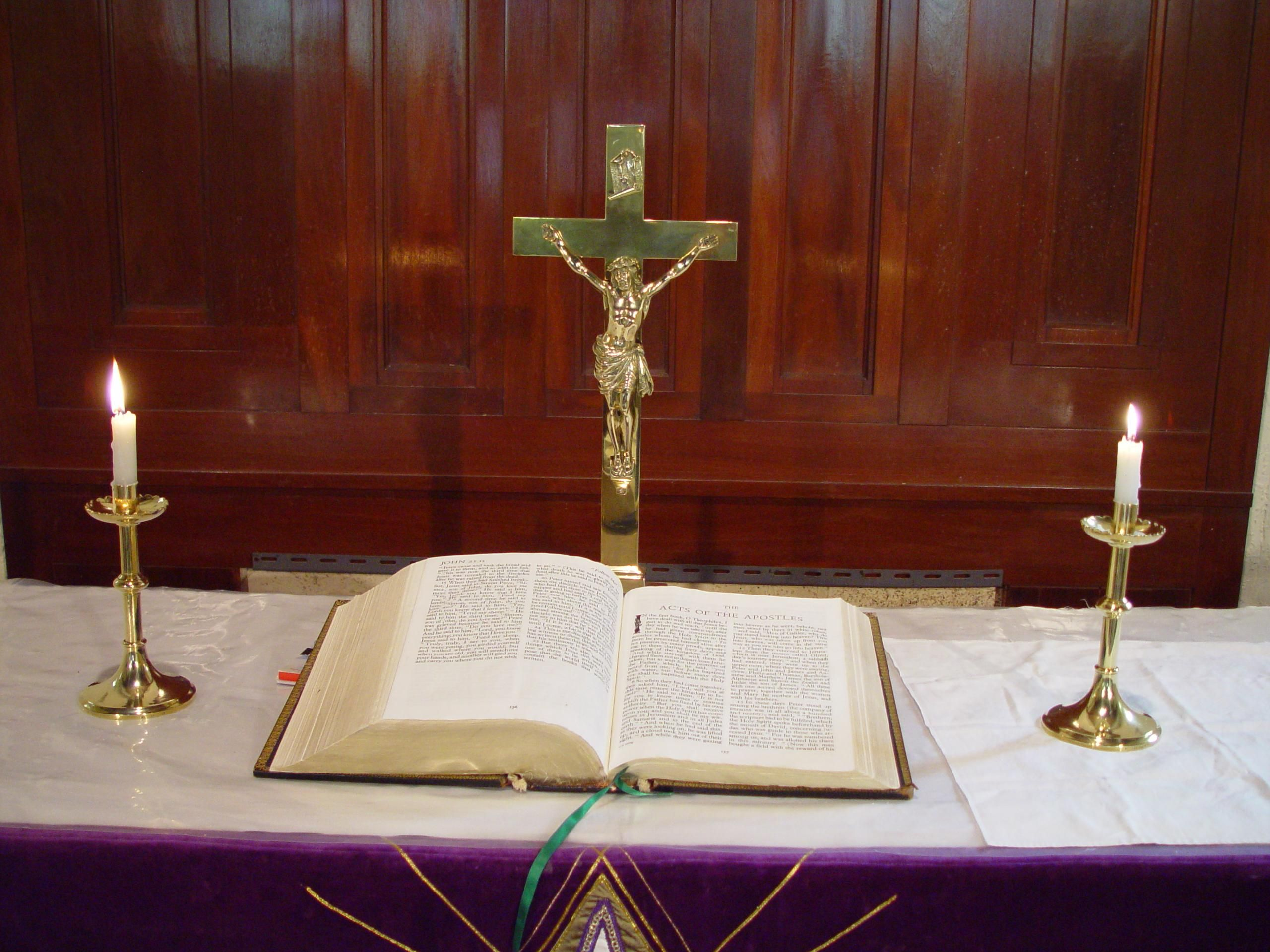
Altar with Christian Bible and crucifix on it, in a Lutheran Protestant church

Protestants did not abandon all icons and symbols of Christianity. They typically avoid the use of images, except the cross, in any context suggestive of veneration. The cross remained their central icon. Technically both major branches of Christianity have had their icons, states Carlos Eire, a professor of religious studies and history, but its meaning has been different to each and "one man's devotion was another man's idolatry". This was particularly true not only in the intra-Christian debate, states Eire, but also when soldiers of Catholic kings replaced "horrible Aztec idols" in the American colonies with "beautiful crosses and images of Mary and the saints".

Protestants often accuse Catholics of idolatry, iconolatry, and even paganism; in the Protestant Reformation such language was common to all Protestants. In some cases, such as the Puritan groups denounced all forms of religious objects, regardless of whether it was a statue or sculpture, or image, including the Christian cross. The Waldensians were accused of idolatry by inquisitors.

The body of Christ on the cross is an ancient symbol used within the Catholic, Eastern Orthodox, Anglican, and Lutheran Churches, in contrast with some Protestant groups, which use only a simple cross. In Judaism, the reverence to the icon of Christ in the form of cross has been seen as idolatry. However, some Jewish scholars disagree and consider Christianity to be based on Jewish belief and not truly idolatrous.

=== Islam ===
In Islamic sources, the concept of shirk (triliteral root: sh-r-k) can refer to "idolatry", though it is most widely used to denote "association of partners with God". The concept of Kufr (k-f-r) can also include idolatry (among other forms of disbelief). The one who practices shirk is called mushrik (plural mushrikun) in the Islamic scriptures. The Quran forbids idolatry. Over 500 mentions of kufr and shirk are found in the Quran, and both concepts are strongly forbidden.

The Islamic concept of idolatry extends beyond polytheism, and includes some Christians and Jews as muširkūn (idolaters) and kafirun (infidels). For example:

Those who say, “Allah is the Messiah, son of Mary,” have certainly fallen into disbelief. The Messiah ˹himself˺ said, “O Children of Israel! Worship Allah—my Lord and your Lord.” Whoever associates others with Allah ˹in worship˺ will surely be forbidden Paradise by Allah. Their home will be the Fire. And the wrongdoers will have no helpers.

— Surah Al-Ma'idah 5:72

Shia classical theology differs in the concept of Shirk. According to Twelver theologians, the attributes and names of God have no independent and hypostatic existence apart from the being and essence of God. Any suggestion of these attributes and names being conceived of as separate is thought to entail polytheism. It would be even incorrect to say God knows by his knowledge which is in his essence but God knows by his knowledge which is his essence. Also God has no physical form and he is insensible. The border between theoretical Tawhid and Shirk is to know that every reality and being in its essence, attributes and action are from him (from Him-ness), it is Tawhid. Every supernatural action of the prophets is by God's permission as Quran points to it. The border between the Tawhid and Shirk in practice is to assume something as an end in itself, independent from God, not as a road to God (to Him-ness). Ismailis go deeper into the definition of Shirk, declaring they don't recognize any sort of ground of being by the esoteric potential to have intuitive knowledge of the human being. Hence, most Shias have no problem with religious symbols and artworks, and with reverence for Walis, Rasūls and Imams.

Islam strongly prohibits all form of idolatry, which is part of the sin of shirk (Arabic: شرك); širk comes from the Arabic root Š-R-K (ش ر ك), with the general meaning of "to share". In the context of the Qur'an, the particular sense of "sharing as an equal partner" is usually understood as "attributing a partner to Allah". Shirk is often translated as idolatry and polytheism. In the Qur'an, shirk and the related word (plural Stem IV active participle) mušrikūn (مشركون) "those who commit shirk" refers to the enemies of Islam (as in verse 9.1–15).

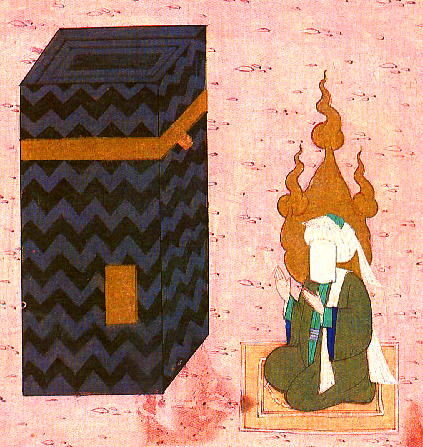
"Muhammad at the Ka'ba" from the Siyer-i Nebi. Muhammad is shown with veiled face, c. 1595.

Within Islam, shirk is sin that can only be forgiven if the person who commits it asks God for forgiveness; if the person who committed it dies without repenting God may forgive any sin except for committing shirk. In practice, especially among strict conservative interpretations of Islam, the term has been greatly extended and means deification of anyone or anything other than the singular God. In Salafi-Wahhabi interpretation, it may be used very widely to describe behaviour that does not literally constitute worship, including use of images of sentient beings, building a structure over a grave, associating partners with God, giving his characteristics to others beside him, or not believing in his characteristics. 19th century Wahhabis regarded idolatry punishable with the death penalty, a practice that was "hitherto unknown" in Islam. However, Classical Orthodox Sunni thought used to be rich in Relics and Saint veneration, as well as pilgrimage to their shrines. Ibn Taymiyya, a medieval theologian that influenced modern days Salafists, was put in prison for his negation of veneration of relics and Saints, as well as pilgrimage to Shrines, which was considered unorthodox by his contemporary theologians.

According to Islamic tradition, over the millennia after Ishmael's death, his progeny and the local tribes who settled around the oasis of Zam-Zam gradually turned to polytheism and idolatry. Several idols were placed within the Kaaba representing deities of different aspects of nature and different tribes. Several heretical rituals were adopted in the Pilgrimage (Hajj) including doing naked circumambulation.

In her book, Islam: A Short History, Karen Armstrong asserts that the Kaaba was officially dedicated to Hubal, a Nabatean deity, and contained 360 idols that probably represented the days of the year. But by Muhammad's day, it seems that the Kaaba was venerated as the shrine of Allah, the High God. Allah was never represented by an idol. Once a year, tribes from all around the Arabian peninsula, whether Christian or pagan, would converge on Mecca to perform the Hajj, marking the widespread conviction that Allah was the same deity worshipped by monotheists. Guillaume in his translation of Ibn Ishaq, an early biographer of Muhammad, says the Ka'aba might have been itself addressed using a feminine grammatical form by the Quraysh. Circumambulation was often performed naked by men and almost naked by women. It is disputed whether al-Lat and Hubal were the same deity or different. Per a hypothesis by Uri Rubin and Christian Robin, Hubal was only venerated by Quraysh and the Kaaba was first dedicated to al-Lat, a supreme god of individuals belonging to different tribes, while the pantheon of the gods of Quraysh was installed in Kaaba after they conquered Mecca a century before Muhammad's time.

Indian Religions

Indologists such as the Max Muller, Jan Gonda, Pandurang Vaman Kane, Ramchandra Narayan Dandekar, Horace Hayman Wilson, Stephanie Jamison and other scholars state that "there is no evidence for icons or images representing god(s)" in the ancient religions of India. Use of idols developed among the Indian religions later, perhaps first in Buddhism, where large images of the Buddha appear by the 1st century AD. According to John Grimes, a professor of Indian philosophy, Indian thought denied even dogmatic idolatry of its scriptures. Everything has been left to challenge, arguments and enquiry, with the medieval Indian scholar Vācaspati Miśra stating that not all scripture is authoritative, only scripture which "reveals the identity of the individual self and the supreme self as the non-dual Absolute".

=== Sikhism ===
Sikhism is a monotheistic Indian religion, and Sikh temples are devoid of idols and icons for God. Yet, Sikhism strongly encourages devotion to God. Some scholars call Sikhism a Bhakti sect of Indian traditions.

In Sikhism, "Nirguni Bhakti" is emphasised – devotion to a divine without Gunas (qualities or form), but its scripture also accepts representations of God with formless (nirguni) and with form (saguni), as stated in Adi Granth 287. Sikhism condemns worshipping images or statues as if it were God, but have historically challenged the iconoclastic policies and Hindu temple destruction activities of Islamic rulers in India. Sikhs house their scripture and revere the Guru Granth Sahib as the final Guru of Sikhism. It is installed in Sikh Gurdwara (temple), many Sikhs bow or prostrate before it on entering the gurdwara. (Note: Such idol caring practices are found in other religions. For example, the Infant Jesus of Prague is venerated in many countries of the Catholic world. In the Prague Church it is housed, it is ritually cared for, cleaned and dressed by the sisters of the Carmelites Church, changing the Infant Jesus' clothing to one of the approximately hundred costumes donated by the faithfuls as gift of devotion. The idol is worshipped with the faithful believing that it renders favors to those who pray to it. Such ritualistic caring of the image of baby Jesus is found in other churches and homes in Central Europe and Portugal / Spain influenced Christian communities with different names, such as Menino Deus.) Guru Granth Sahib is ritually installed every morning, and put to bed at night in many Gurdwaras. In the Dasam Bani, Guru Gobind Singh wrote "I am idol-breaker" on line 95 of his Zafarnamah.

== Cultures affected by opposition to idolatry ==
=== Ancient religions ===
The Ancient Egyptian religion was polytheistic, with large idols that were either animals or included animal parts. Ancient Greek civilization preferred human forms, with idealized proportions, for divine representation. The Canaanites of West Asia incorporated a golden calf into their pantheon.

The ancient philosophy and practices of the Greeks, thereafter Romans, were imbued with polytheistic idolatry. They debate what is an image and if the use of image is appropriate. To Plato, images can be a remedy or poison to the human experience. To Aristotle, states Paul Kugler, an image is an appropriate mental intermediary that "bridges between the inner world of the mind and the outer world of material reality", the image is a vehicle between sensation and reason. Idols are useful psychological catalysts, they reflect sense data and pre-existing inner feelings. They are neither the origins nor the destinations of thought but the intermediary in the human inner journey. Fervid opposition to the idolatry of the Greeks and Romans was of Early Christianity and later Islam, as evidenced by the widespread desecration and defacement of ancient Greek and Roman sculptures that have survived into the modern era.

=== Buddhism ===
According to Eric Reinders, icons and idolatry have been an integral part of Buddhism throughout its later history. Buddhists, from Korea to Vietnam, Thailand to Tibet, Central Asia to South Asia, have long produced temples and idols, altars and malas, relics to amulets, images to ritual implements. The images or relics of Buddha are found in all Buddhist traditions, but they also feature gods and goddesses such as those in Tibetan Buddhism.

According to Peter Harvey – a professor of Buddhist Studies, Buddha idols and idolatry spread into northwest Indian subcontinent (now Pakistan and Afghanistan) and into Central Asia with Buddhist Silk Road merchants. The Hindu rulers of different Indian dynasties patronized both Buddhism and Hinduism from 4th to 9th century, building Buddhist icons and cave temples such as the Ajanta Caves and Ellora Caves which featured Buddha idols. From the 10th century, states Harvey, the raids into northwestern parts of South Asia by Muslim Turks destroyed Buddhist idols, given their religious dislike for idolatry. The iconoclasm was so linked to Buddhism, that the Islamic texts of this era in India called all idols as Budd. The desecration of idols in cave temples continued through the 17th century, states Geri Malandra, from the offense of "the graphic, anthropomorphic imagery of Hindu and Buddhist shrines".

In East Asia and Southeast Asia, worship in Buddhist temples with the aid of icons and sacred objects has been historically prevalent. In Japanese Buddhism, for example, Butsugu (sacred objects) have been integral to the worship of the Buddha (kuyo), and such idolatry considered a part of the process of realizing one's Buddha nature. This process is more than meditation, it has traditionally included devotional rituals (butsudo) aided by the Buddhist clergy. These practices are also found in Korea and China.

=== Hinduism ===
In Hinduism, an icon, image or statue is called murti or pratima. Major Hindu traditions such as Vaishnavism, Shaivism, Shaktism, and Smartism favor the use of a murti (idol). These traditions suggest that it is easier to dedicate time and focus on spirituality through anthropomorphic or non-anthropomorphic icons. A murti in Hinduism, states Jeaneane Fowler – a professor of Religious Studies specializing on Indian Religions, is itself not god, it is an "image of god" and thus a symbol and representation. A murti is a form and manifestation, states Fowler, of the formless Absolute. In Hinduism, a murti is not regarded as an independent deity separate from God, nor merely as a symbolic representation. Rather, after consecration, it is understood to be a sacred form through which God is fully present and accepts the devotion of worshippers. Thus, In major Hindu sects such as Vaishnavism, Murtis are not merely "representations" of God but are understood as a "focus" or "locus" of God's presence. In this understanding, God is believed to be truly present in the Murtis. A literal translation of murti as "idol" is incorrect when "idol" is understood as a superstitious end in itself. Just as a photograph of a person is not the person themselves, a murti is an image but not merely regarded as the material it is made from (i.e. wood, clay, etc.). In many Hindu traditions however, a consecrated murti is understood to be a sacred embodiment or presence of the deity through which devotees offer worship and receive divine grace, rather than serving solely as an emotional or symbolic reminder. When a person worships a murti, it is assumed to be a manifestation of the essence or spirit of the deity, the worshipper's spiritual ideas and needs are meditated through it, yet the idea of ultimate reality or Brahman is not confined in it.

Christopher John Fuller states that an image in Hinduism cannot be equated with a deity and the object of worship is the divine whose power is inside the image, and the image is not the object of worship itself: Hindus believe everything is worthy of worship as it contains divine energy. The idols are neither random nor intended as superstitious objects, rather they are designed with embedded symbolism and iconographic rules which sets the style, proportions, the colors, the nature of items the images carry, their mudra and the legends associated with the deity. The Vāstusūtra Upaniṣad states that the aim of the murti art is to inspire a devotee towards contemplating the Ultimate Supreme Principle (Brahman). This text adds (abridged):

From the contemplation of images grows delight, from delight faith, from faith steadfast devotion, through such devotion arises that higher understanding (parāvidyā) that is the royal road to moksha. Without the guidance of images, the mind of the devotee may go ashtray and form wrong imaginations. Images dispel false imaginations. (... ) It is in the mind of Rishis (sages), who see and have the power of discerning the essence of all created things of manifested forms. They see their different characters, the divine and the demoniac, the creative and the destructive forces, in their eternal interplay. It is this vision of Rishis, of gigantic drama of cosmic powers in eternal conflict, which the Sthapakas (Silpins, murti and temple artists) drew the subject-matter for their work.

— Pippalada, Vāstusūtra Upaniṣad, Introduction by Alice Boner et al.

Some Hindu movements founded during the colonial era, such as the Arya Samaj and Satya Mahima Dharma reject idolatry.

=== Jainism ===
The creation of idols, their consecration, the inclusion of Jaina layperson in idols and temples of Jainism by the Jaina monks has been a historic practice. However, during the iconoclastic era of Islamic rule, between the 15th and 17th century, a Lonka sect of Jainism emerged that continued pursuing their traditional spirituality but without the Jaina arts, images and idols.

=== Africa ===
Africa has numerous ethnic groups, and their diverse religious idea have been grouped as African Traditional Religions, sometimes abbreviated to ATR. These religions typically believe in a Supreme Being which goes by different regional names, as well as spirit world often linked to ancestors, and mystical magical powers through divination. Idols and their worship have been associated with all three components in the African Traditional Religions.

According to J.O. Awolalu, proselytizing Christians and Muslims have mislabelled idol to mean false god, when in the reality of most traditions of Africa, the object may be a piece of wood or iron or stone, yet it is "symbolic, an emblem and implies the spiritual idea which is worshipped". The material objects may decay or get destroyed, the emblem may crumble or substituted, but the spiritual idea that it represents to the heart and mind of an African traditionalist remains unchanged. Sylvester Johnson – a professor of African American and Religious Studies, concurs with Awolalu, and states that the colonial era missionaries who arrived in Africa, neither understood the regional languages nor the African theology, and interpreted the images and ritualism as "epitome of idolatry", projecting the iconoclastic controversies in Europe they grew up with, onto Africa.

First with the arrival of Islam in Africa, then during the Christian colonial efforts, the religiously justified wars, the colonial portrayal of idolatry as proof of savagery, the destruction of idols and the seizure of idolaters as slaves marked a long period of religious intolerance, which supported religious violence and demeaning caricature of the African Traditional Religionists. The violence against idolaters and idolatry of Traditional Religion practicers of Africa started in the medieval era and continued into the modern era. The charge of idolatry by proselytizers, state Michael Wayne Cole and Rebecca Zorach, served to demonize and dehumanize local African populations, and justify their enslavement and abuse locally or far off plantations, settlements or for forced domestic labor.

=== Americas ===
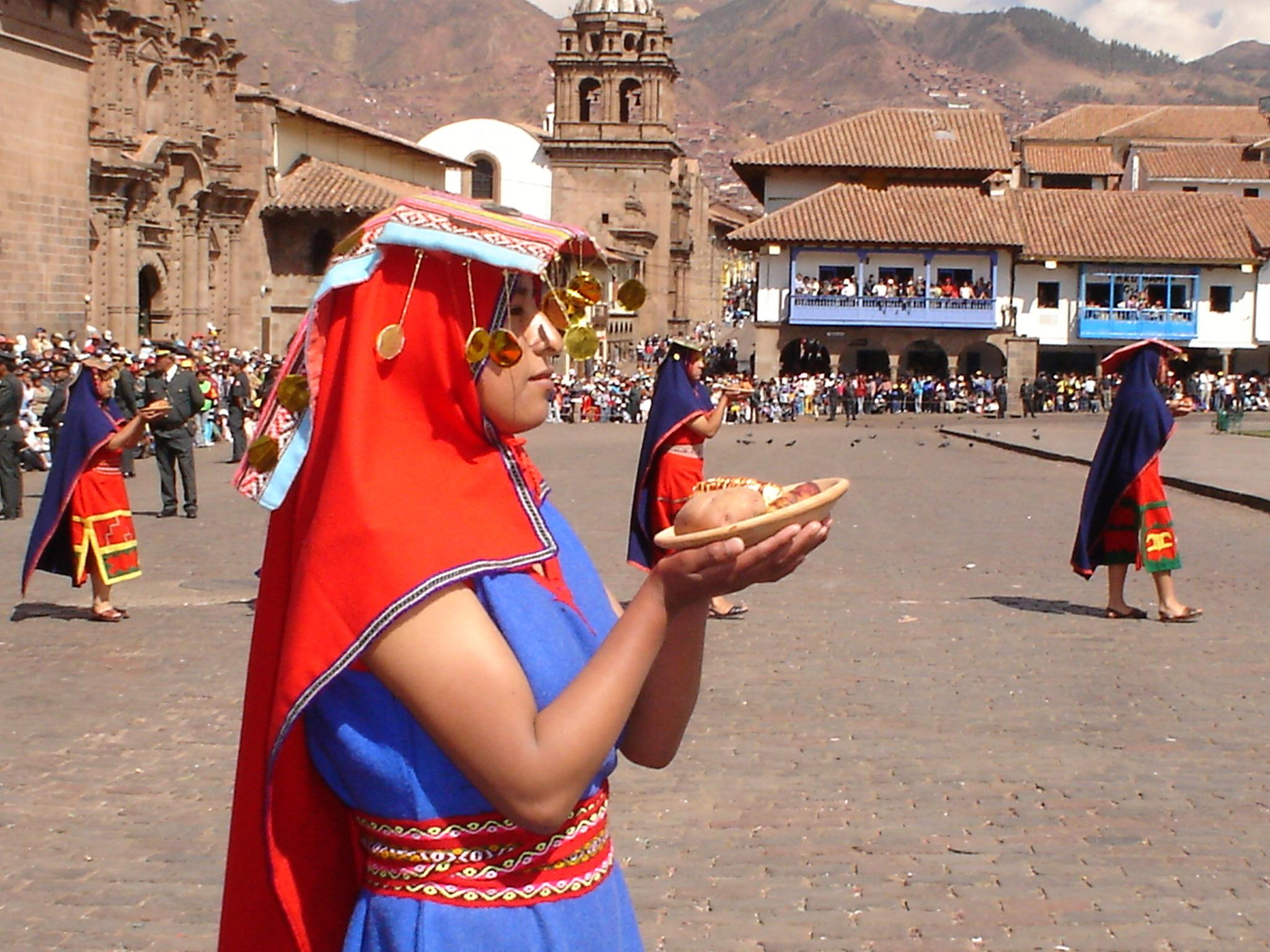
Inti Raymi, a winter solstice festival of the Inca people, reveres Inti – the sun deity. Offerings include round bread and maize beer.

Statues, images and temples have been a part of the Traditional Religions of the indigenous people of the Americas. The Incan, Mayan and Aztec civilizations developed sophisticated religious practices that incorporated idols and religious arts. The Inca culture, for example, has believed in Viracocha (also called Pachacutec) as the creator deity and nature deities such as Inti (sun deity), and Mama Cocha the goddess of the sea, lakes, rivers and waters.

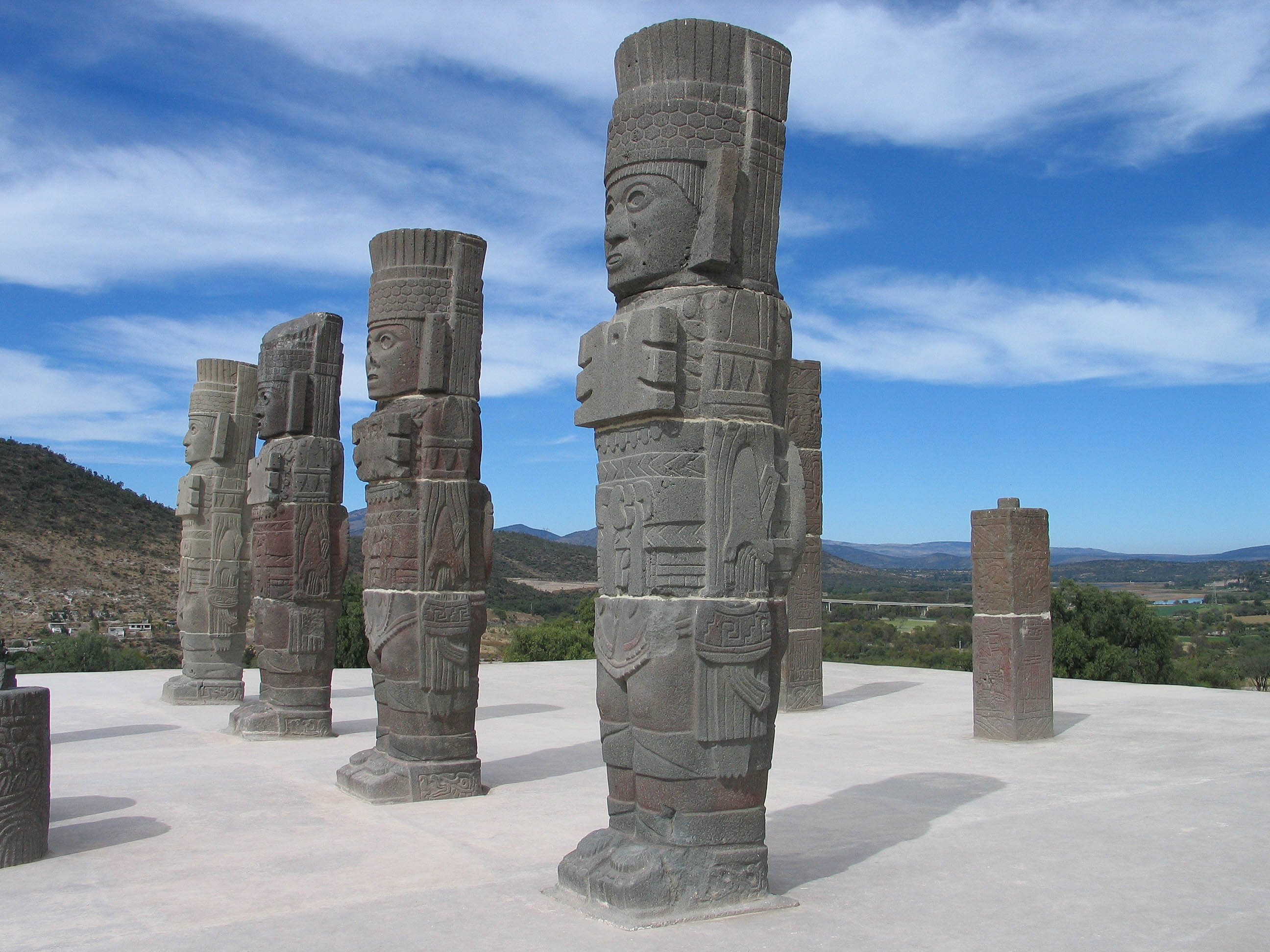
The Aztec Tula Atlantean statues (above) have been called symbols of idolatry, but may have just been stone images of warriors.

In Mayan culture, Kukulkan has been the supreme creator deity, also revered as the god of reincarnation, water, fertility and wind. The Mayan people built step pyramid temples to honor Kukulkan, aligning them to the Sun's position on the spring equinox. Other deities found at Mayan archaeological sites include Xib Chac – the benevolent male rain deity, and Ixchel – the benevolent female earth, weaving and pregnancy goddess. A deity with aspects similar to Kulkulkan in the Aztec culture has been called Quetzalcoatl.

Missionaries came to the Americas with the start of Spanish colonial era, and the Catholic Church did not tolerate any form of native idolatry, preferring that the icons and images of Jesus and Mary replace the native idols. Aztec, for example, had a written history which included those about their Traditional Religion, but the Spanish colonialists destroyed this written history in their zeal to end what they considered as idolatry, and to convert the Aztecs to Catholicism. The Aztec Indians, however, preserved their religion and religious practices by burying their idols under the crosses, and then continuing their idol worship rituals and practices, aided by the syncretic composite of atrial crosses and their idols as before.

During and after the imposition of Catholic Christianity during Spanish colonialism, the Incan people retained their original beliefs in deities through syncretism, where they overlay the Christian God and teachings over their original beliefs and practices. The male deity Inti became accepted as the Christian God, but the Andean rituals centered around idolatry of Incan deities have been retained and continued thereafter into the modern era by the Incan people.

=== Polynesia ===
The Polynesian people have had a range of polytheistic theologies found across the Pacific Ocean. The Polynesian people produced idols from wood, and congregated around these idols for worship.

The Christian missionaries, particularly from the London Missionary Society such as John Williams, and others such as the Methodist Missionary Society, characterized these as idolatry, in the sense of islanders worshipping false gods. They sent back reports which primarily focussed on "overthrow of pagan idolatry" as evidence of their Christian sects triumph, with fewer mentions of actual converts and baptism.

== Religious tolerance and intolerance ==
The term false god is often used throughout the Abrahamic scriptures (Torah, Tanakh, Bible, and Quran) to single out Yahweh (interpreted by Jews, Samaritans, and Christians) or Elohim/Allah (interpreted by Muslims) as the only true God. Nevertheless, the Hebrew Bible/Old Testament itself recognizes and reports that originally the Israelites were not monotheists but actively engaged in idolatry and worshipped many foreign, non-Jewish Gods besides Yahweh and/or instead of him, such as Baal, Astarte, Asherah, Chemosh, Dagon, Moloch, Tammuz, and more, and continued to do so until their return from the Babylonian exile (see Ancient Hebrew religion). Judaism, the oldest Abrahamic religion, eventually shifted into a strict, exclusive monotheism, based on the sole veneration of Yahweh, the predecessor to the Abrahamic conception of God. (Note: Although the Semitic god El is indeed the most ancient predecessor to the Abrahamic god, this specifically refers to the ancient ideas Yahweh once encompassed in the Ancient Hebrew religion, such as being a storm- and war-god, living on mountains, or controlling the weather. Thus, in this page's context, "Yahweh" is used to refer to God as conceived in the Ancient Hebrew religion, and should not be referenced when describing his later worship in today's Abrahamic religions.)

The vast majority of religions in history have been and/or are still polytheistic, worshipping many diverse deities. Moreover, the material depiction of a deity or more deities has always played an eminent role in all cultures of the world. The claim to worship the "one and only true God" came to most of the world with the arrival of Abrahamic religions and is the distinguishing characteristic of their monotheistic worldview, whereas virtually all the other religions in the world have been and/or are still animistic and polytheistic. Some Neopagan religions such as Wicca utilize statues of deities within their worship experience.

The accusations and presumption that all idols and images are devoid of symbolism, or that icons of one's own religion are "true, healthy, uplifting, beautiful symbolism, mark of devotion, divine", while of other person's religion are "false, an illness, superstitious, grotesque madness, evil addiction, satanic, and cause of all incivility" is more a matter of subjective personal interpretation, rather than objective impersonal truth. Regina Schwartz and some other contemporary scholars state allegations that idols only represent false gods, followed by iconoclastic destruction is only little more than religious intolerance.

In A Letter Concerning Toleration (1689), the philosopher John Locke argued against the suppression of idolatry by civil authorities. He contended that once civil power is permitted to impose penalties in religious matters, there can be no principled limit to state interference. Locke further contended that the classification of a religious practice as sinful does not justify its punishment by the state, since it is not the magistrate's role to enforce all perceived offenses against God. The Scottish Enlightenment philosopher David Hume wrote in his essay Dialogues Concerning Natural Religion (1779) that the worship of different gods and idols in Pagan religions is premised on religious pluralism, tolerance, and acceptance of diverse representations of the divine. .

== See also ==
- Buddhist devotion – prayer ritual in Buddhism
- Dambana
- Kemetism
- Deity
- El Tío
- Fetishism
- Idolization
- Jezebel
- Perceptions of religious imagery in natural phenomena
- Puja (Hinduism) – prayer ritual in Hinduism
- Iconolatry – Worship of icons
