= National Highway 153B (India) =

National highway in India

National Highway 153B
- Map of the National Highway in red
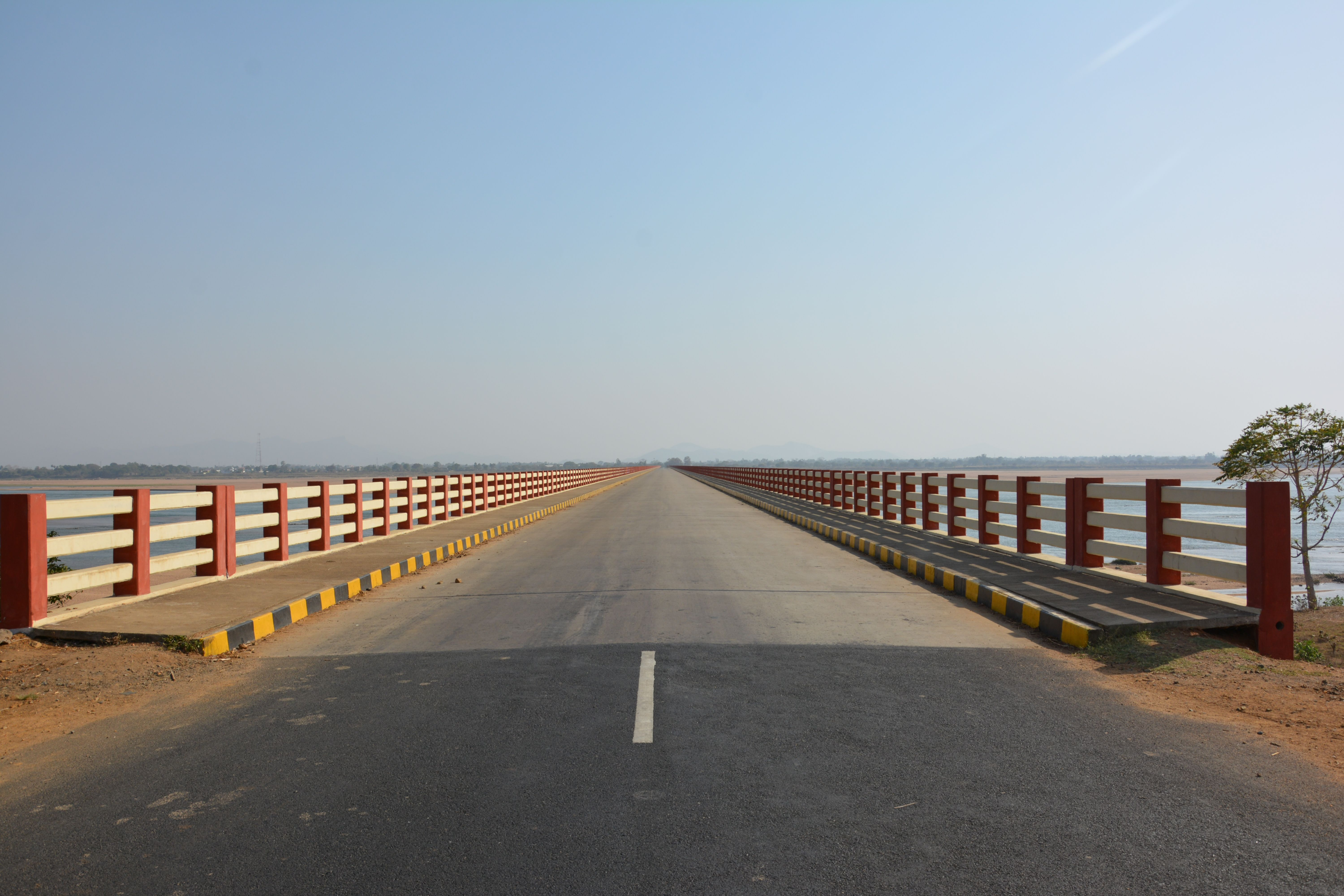
- Mahanadi Bridge near Boudh

Route information
- Auxiliary route of NH 53
- Length: 118 km (73 mi)

Major junctions
- East end: Sarapal
- West end: Bauda

Location
- Country: India
- States: Odisha

Highway system
- Roads in India; Expressways; National; State; Asian
← NH 53	→ NH 57

National Highway 153B, commonly referred to as NH 153B is a national highway in India. It is a spur road of National Highway 53. NH-153B traverses the state of Odisha.

== Route ==
Sarapal - Naktideul - Redhakhol - Bauda.

== Junctions ==
Location	Destinations	Notes
Sarapal	NH 53	Eastern terminus; junction with NH 53
Redhakhol	NH 55	
Bauda	NH 57	Western terminus; junction with NH 57
1.000 mi = 1.609 km; 1.000 km = 0.621 mi

== See also ==
- List of national highways in India
- List of national highways in India by state
