= Bhima Bhoi =

19th-century Indian saint, poet and social reformer

Santha Kabi Bhima Bhoi
- ଭୀମ ଭୋଇ
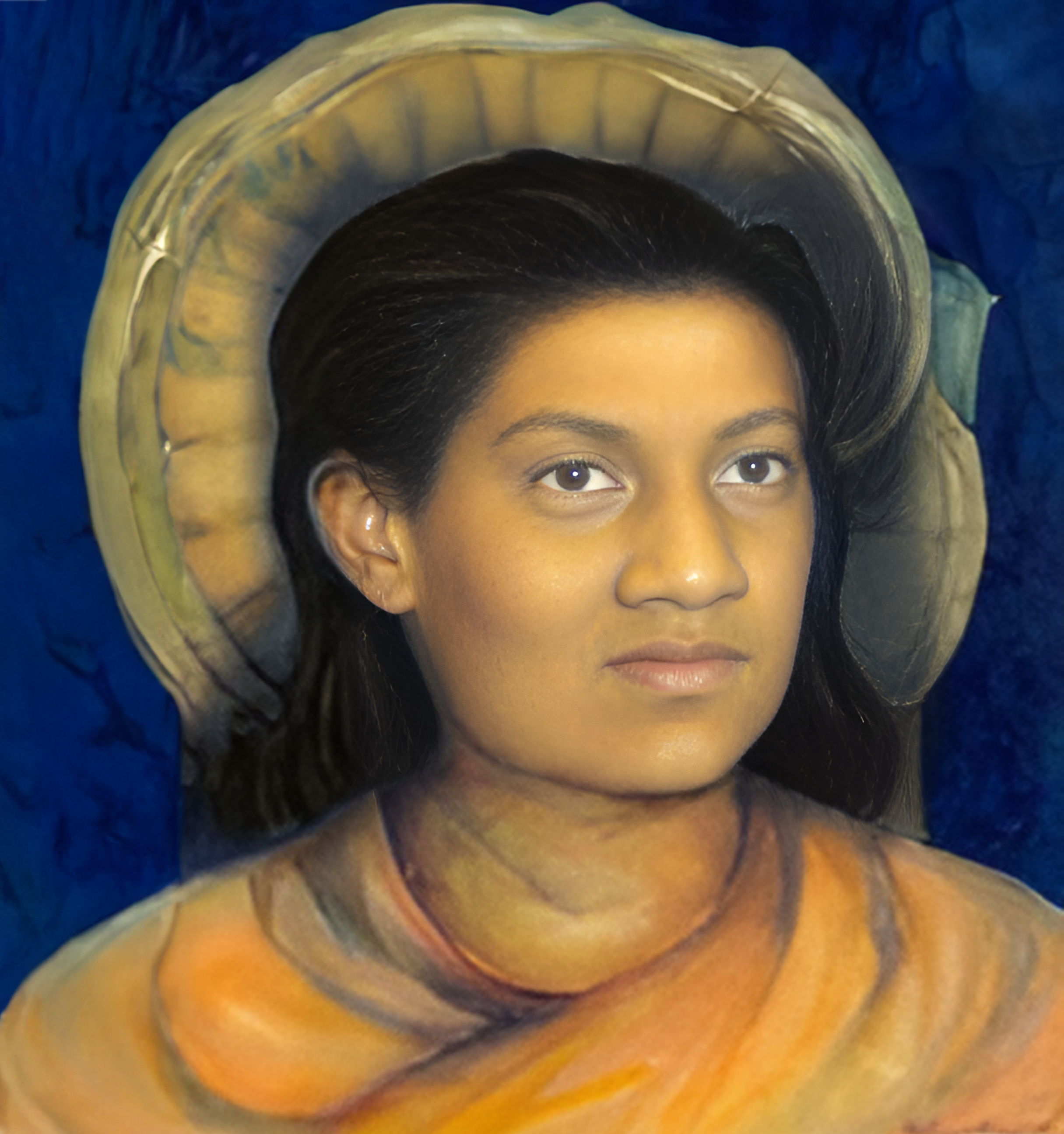

Personal life
- Born: 1850 Madhupur, Rairakhol, Odisha
- Died: 1895 (aged 44–45) Subarnapur, Odisha
- Spouse: Annapurna
- Children: Labanyabati (daughter) Kapileshwar (son)
- Notable works: Stuti Chintamani; Brahma Nirupana Gita; Srutinisedha Gita; Nirbeda Sadhana

Religious life
- Religion: Hinduism
- Dharma name: Satya Mahima Dharma

Religious career
- Teacher: Guru Mahima Swami

Bhima Bhoi (1850 – 1895) was a 19th-century saint, Odia poet, mystic, and social reformer from the state of Odisha in India. He was a follower of Mahima Swami, and his teachings and poetry were deeply influenced by Mahima Dharma, a monotheistic religious movement in Odisha. Bhima Bhoi was a bhakta (Odia: devotee) of Mahima Gosain, the founder of Satya Mahima Dharma, an Indian religious tradition that challenged the authority of caste and other forms of discrimination. Bhima Bhoi is remembered for his mystical poetry, which was primarily in the Odia language, and his social reform efforts aimed at uplifting the marginalized sections of society.

== Early life ==
Bhima Bhoi was born in Madhupur in Rairakhol in 1850, though various sources have cited different years as well as different places of birth. Bhima Bhoi's family belonged to the Kondh tribe. Bhoi's family was not well off and by most accounts, his early life was not happy. Despite losing eyesight in one eye to smallpox in his early childhood, Bhima Bhoi gained knowledge by listening to the recitation of religious texts from a nearby Bhagabata Tungi. Bhima Bhoi soon left his place of birth and reached the Rairakhol area and was employed as a servant by a farmer. He worked as a cattle caretaker and lived in a chawl near the farmer's cowshed as he was from an "untouchable" tribe.

== Spiritual journey and teachings ==
At the age of twelve, Bhima Bhoi left his job and began his spiritual journey, performing penance at Kapilas, where his guru Mahima Swami had meditated and preached. Four Brahmin disciples inscribed the songs that he recited. After working in the Joronda region for some time, Bhima Bhoi established his ashram in Khaliapali near Sonepur. He attracted numerous disciples, married, and started a family. Bhima Bhoi died in Khaliapali in 1895.

Bhima Bhoi, like his guru Mahima Swami, primarily taught Ekaishwara Brahmavada or the belief in One God, who is indescribable (Aleka), formless (Arupa), shapeless (Nirakara), and pure (Niranjan). According to his teachings, this supreme being resides in the void (Sunya) and can be attained through the ideals of Mahima Swami. Bhima Bhoi's followers came from various backgrounds, including established families, marginalized castes, and women's groups. They lived and worked together, transcending their social identities. His teachings emphasized simple truths of life, such as not lying, stealing, engaging in adultery, or discriminating against others. As a social reformer, Bhima Bhoi was a strong subaltern voice in his time, and his teachings resonated with many people both in and outside of Odisha. Even today, his followers continue to practice Mahima Dharma with devotion and dedication.

== Literary works ==
Bhima Bhoi's language is characterized by its mysticism, musicality, and colloquial nature, which made it accessible to common folk. He departed from the use of Sanskritized Odia, adopting the vernacular language instead. His poetry exhibits influences from the Western Odia dialect, known as Sambalpuri. As a result, his poems have a "spoken sung" quality, which is typical of bhakti poetry. Bhima Bhoi's verses are rhythmic, lyrical, and feature internal and end rhyming patterns that contribute to the beauty of his poems. Bhima Bhoi's poetry was initially composed orally, sometimes spontaneously, and was later written down by scribes. This characteristic is shared with other bhakti poets and highlights the oral tradition of the movement.

Bhima Bhoi was a popular poet, composer and singer. Humanity and liberation of the world based on the philosophy of Mahima Dharma were the central theme of his poetic creations. His assertion "mo jeevana pachhe narke padithau, jagata uddhara heu" (transl. let my life rot in hell if necessary, but let the world be redeemed) showcases his dedication to the upliftment of the societally deprived while being a clear reflection of socio-economic conditions in the State, during his lifetime. Bhima Bhoi composed more than one hundred collections of poems, though only about twelve are available today. Efforts are ongoing to collect more texts by the poet. His important works include Brahma Nirupana Gita, Stuti Chintamani, Astaka Bihari Gita, Chautisa Madhu Chakra, and Bhajanamala. Two collections, Atha Bhajan and Bangala Atha Bhajan, are written in the Bengali language.

=== Stuti Chintamani ===
Stuti Chintamani is considered the most important poetical work of Bhima Bhoi. It consists of 100 chapters, each containing 20 two-line stanzas, totaling 4,000 lines. The poem is a set of prayers to Brahma, with the poet asking for redemption from the suffering and injustices that humanity experiences in the Kaliyuga. Bhima Bhoi emphasizes the importance of devotion (bhakti) over knowledge (gyana) in achieving salvation.

O Lord from my childhood I have known the intensity of
my misery. Thinking of it in the lotus of my heart I have
not been blessed with happiness even for a moment. From
my birth I am hapless. My parents left me in this world
alone. If I crave for a happy meal or pleasure wherefrom
can I ever get it ?
It is not tears but blood that used to trickle down
as I have wiped them. None other than Sriguru knows
what miseries I have gone through.
When I completed the age of four, once in the
month of jyestha a wandering yogi dressed in loin-cloth of
ochre colour came to the village. In both his hands I have
clearly noticed the symbols of conch and the wheel.

— Stuti Chintamani, Bhima Bhoi

== Recognition in the present ==
While scholars have studied the life and poetry of Bhima Bhoi, research chairs have recently been established at Kalinga Institute of Social Sciences - Deemed to be University (in April 2018) and Gangadhar Meher University in 2019, to research the impact of Bhima Bhoi's life and philosophy in Odisha. In honour of Bhima Bhoi, Bolangir Medical College is named Bhima Bhoi Medical College.

== See also ==
- List of Indian poets
- Odissi music
