= Tebhapadar =

Tebhapadar Nuan Tebhapadar, Purna Diha
- Village
- Location in Odisha, India
- Coordinates: 20°54′24.43″N 84°10′35.34″E
- Country: India
- State: Odisha

Area
  - Total: 3.0581 km^{2} (1.1807 sq mi)

Population
  - Total: 1,326
  - Density: 433.6/km^{2} (1,123/sq mi)

Languages
  - Official: Odia
- Time zone: UTC+5:30 (IST)
- Nearest city: Subalaya, Birmaharajpur, Rairakhol
- Lok Sabha constituency: Balangir
- Vidhan Sabha constituency: Birmaharajpur

Tebhapadar is a village of Birmaharajpur subdivision of Subarnapur district of Odisha, India. It is located on the bank of Surubalijora and Mahanadi River. Total population of this village is 1,326 out of which 697 are male and 629 are female. This village is spread over 755.673 acres (3.05810 km^{2}) of land.

This village is located on side of the main road that connects Rairakhol to Sambalpur via Birmaharajpur. The neighboring villages are Ambasarabhata, Buromala, and Pitamahul.
