= Joranda Gadi =

Hindu temple in Odisha, India

Coordinates: 20.785601°N 85.725766°E

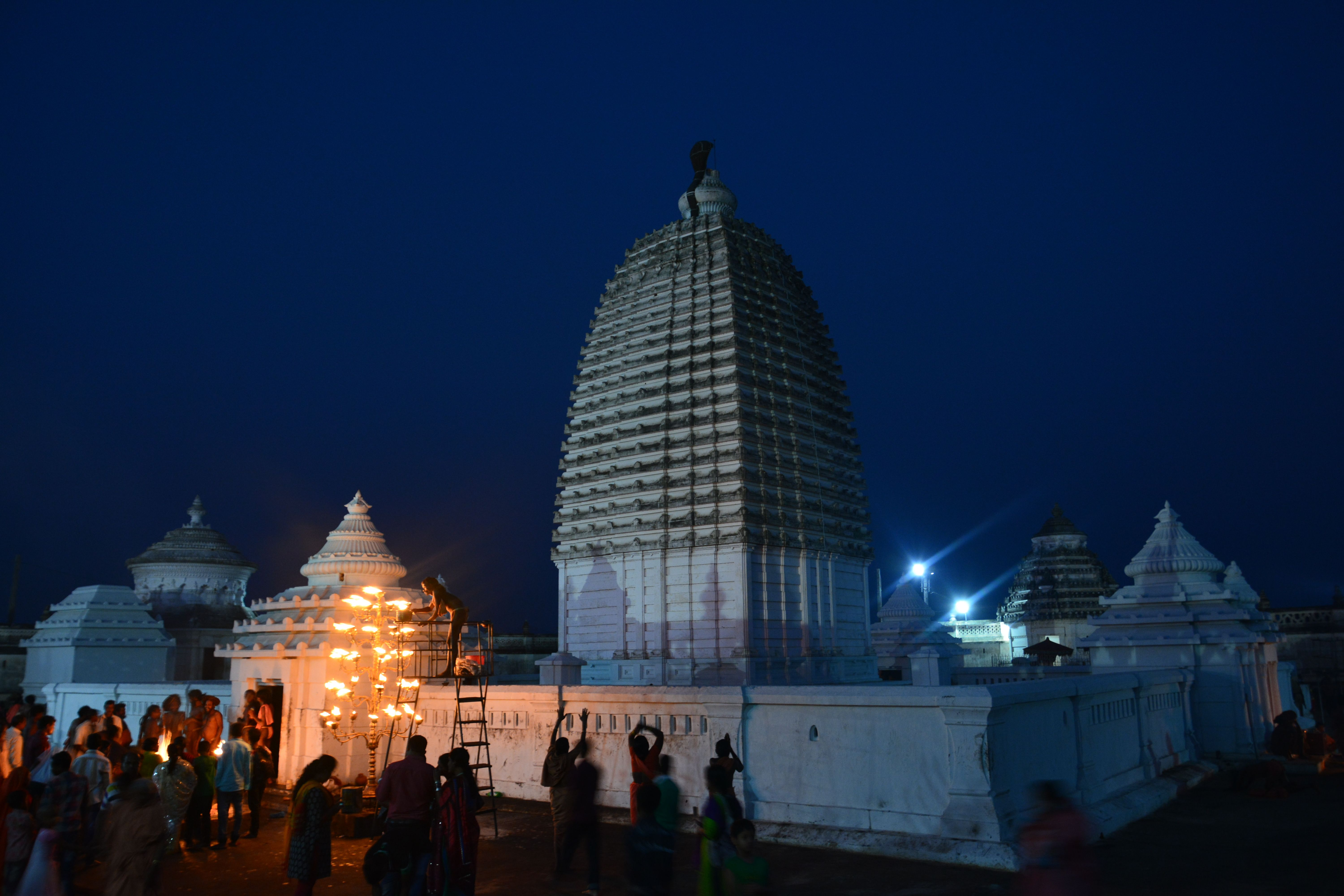
- Main temple of Joranda Gadi of Mahima Sect

Religion
- Affiliation: Mahima Dharma
- District: Dhenkanal
- Festival: Magh Mela

Location
- Location: Joranda
- State: Odisha

Joranda Gadhi is a temple built in a location where three villages meet: Joranda, Natima and Patna. The temple is dedicated to the supreme lord. The followers of mahima dharma worship him as Sunya Brahma or the shapeless lord. No idol worship is permitted in this sect. The temple is dedicated to the supreme lord. Many people of other sects believe that the followers of this sect worship Surya, the sun god, but it is absolutely false. They just pray to the supreme lord facing to the direction of surya because it fixes the direction of concentration. One can choose one's own fixed direction apart from east and west, but once fixed it cannot be changed.

== Temple design ==
The temple was built in the early 20th century, but the shrine existed from the early 14th century. It is the Samadhi Peetha of Mahima Goswami, who spread the Mahima Dharma. Mahima Dharma is a distinct religion in the tradition of Indian religions, although the principles of the sect may seem similar to those of Panchashakha, Buddhism, Tantra and Jainism. They recognize how enormously sacred for them the Bhagavata Purana is. They respect all Gods. The sect belongs to a group of ascetics. As the ascetics of this sect are not supposed to spend more than two consecutive nights in one village, by staying at the meeting point one can change the position to other corner of the temple. The temple is dedicated to the supreme lord as Sunya Bramha, the formless lord. No image worship is done inside. Currently, ascetics belonging to this sect sit here. Every year, Maagha mela attracts many ascetics. It is located just 24 km North of Dhenkanal town. It gives spiritual concentration to all of the visitors.

== Joranda Mela ==
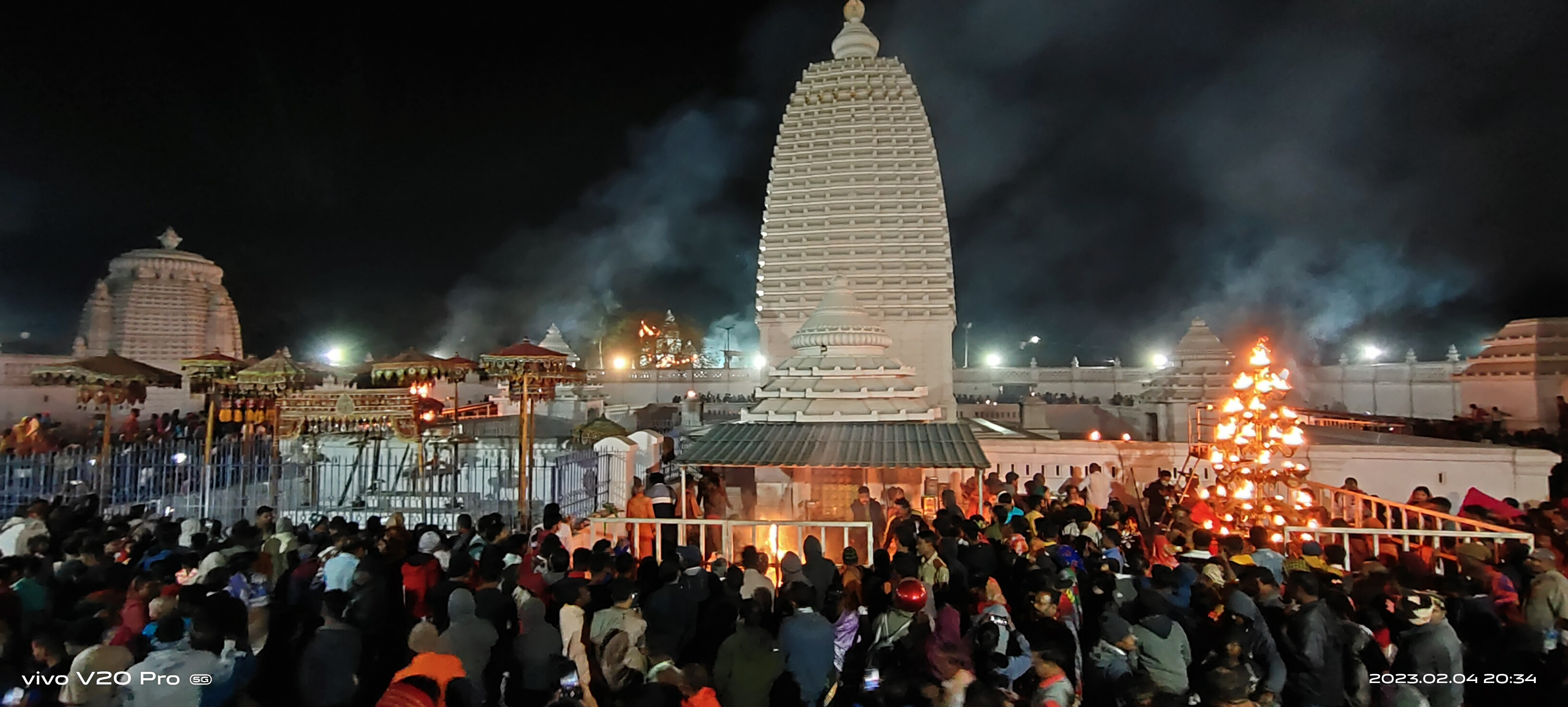
Mahima Dharma, also known as Mahima Panth, is a Hindu sect practiced primarily in Odisha and nearby states. The religious movement was based on the worship of God, known as ALEKH, as attribute less as condemnation of all religious customs set by the rich and upper-class society generally.

Joranda mela is celebrated by mainly Mahima Dharma people. This festival is held on full-moon day of Magha (Magha Purnima Day) which falls in January–February every year.

== Gallery ==
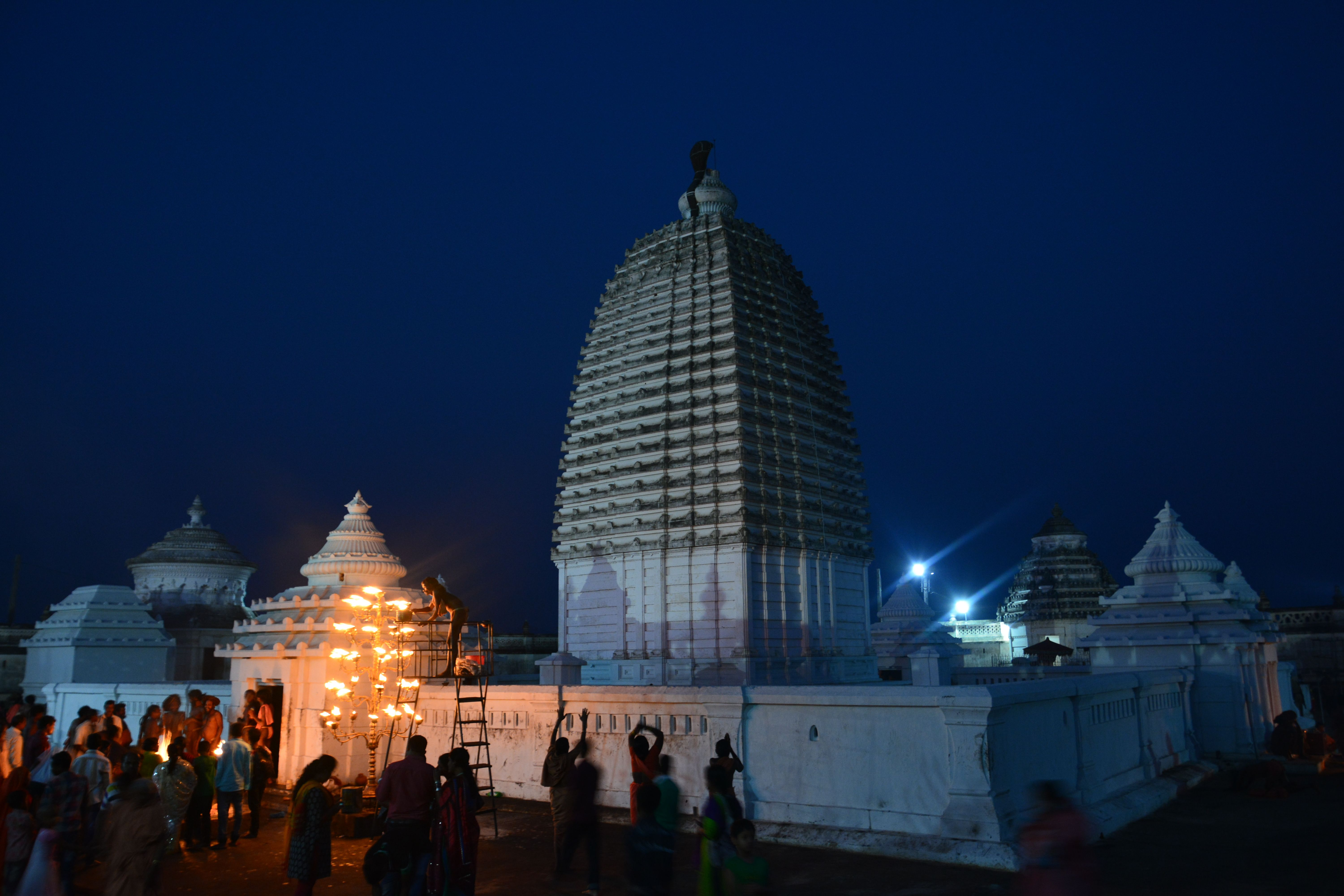
Main temple where all rituals carried out

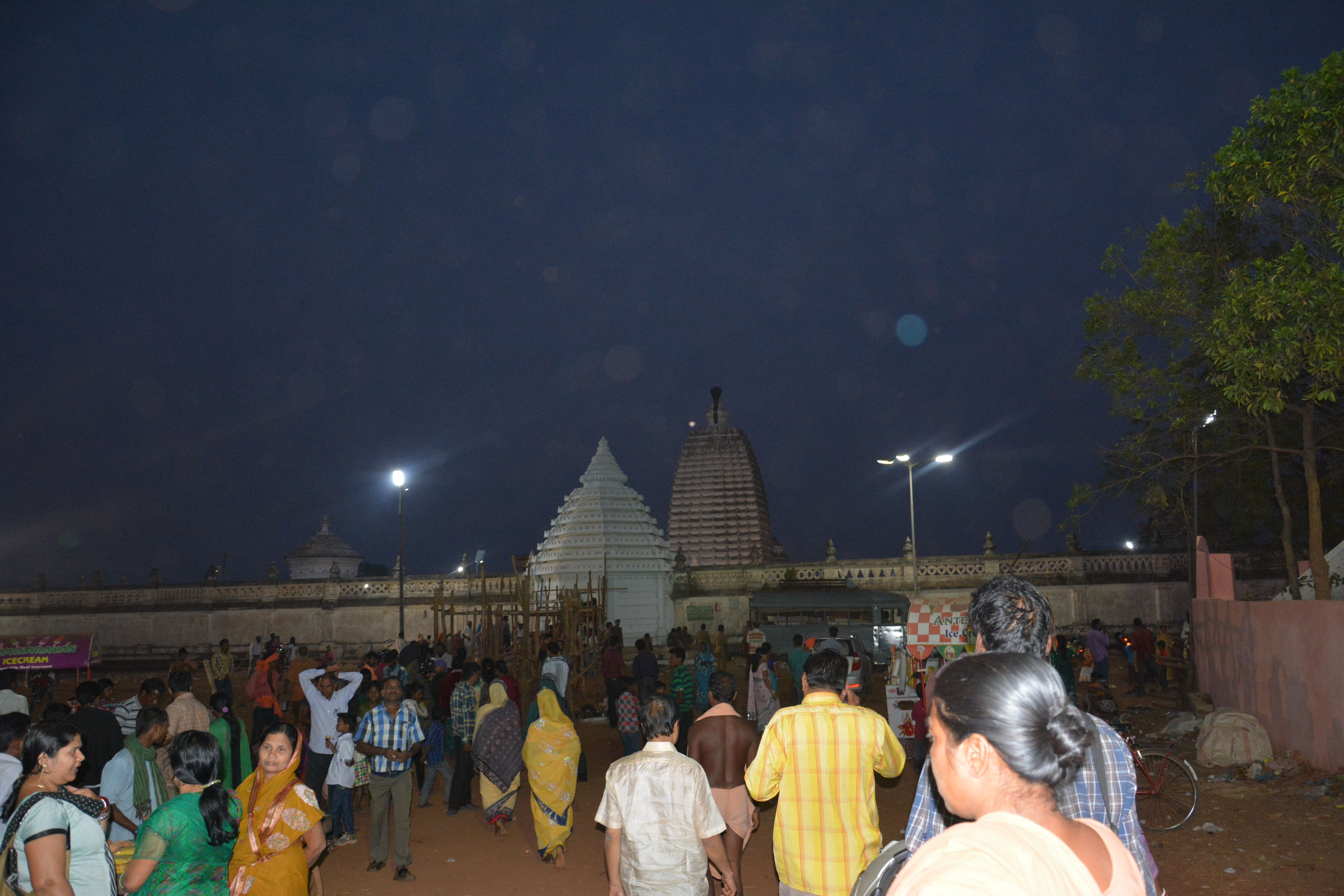
During Joranda mela 2014

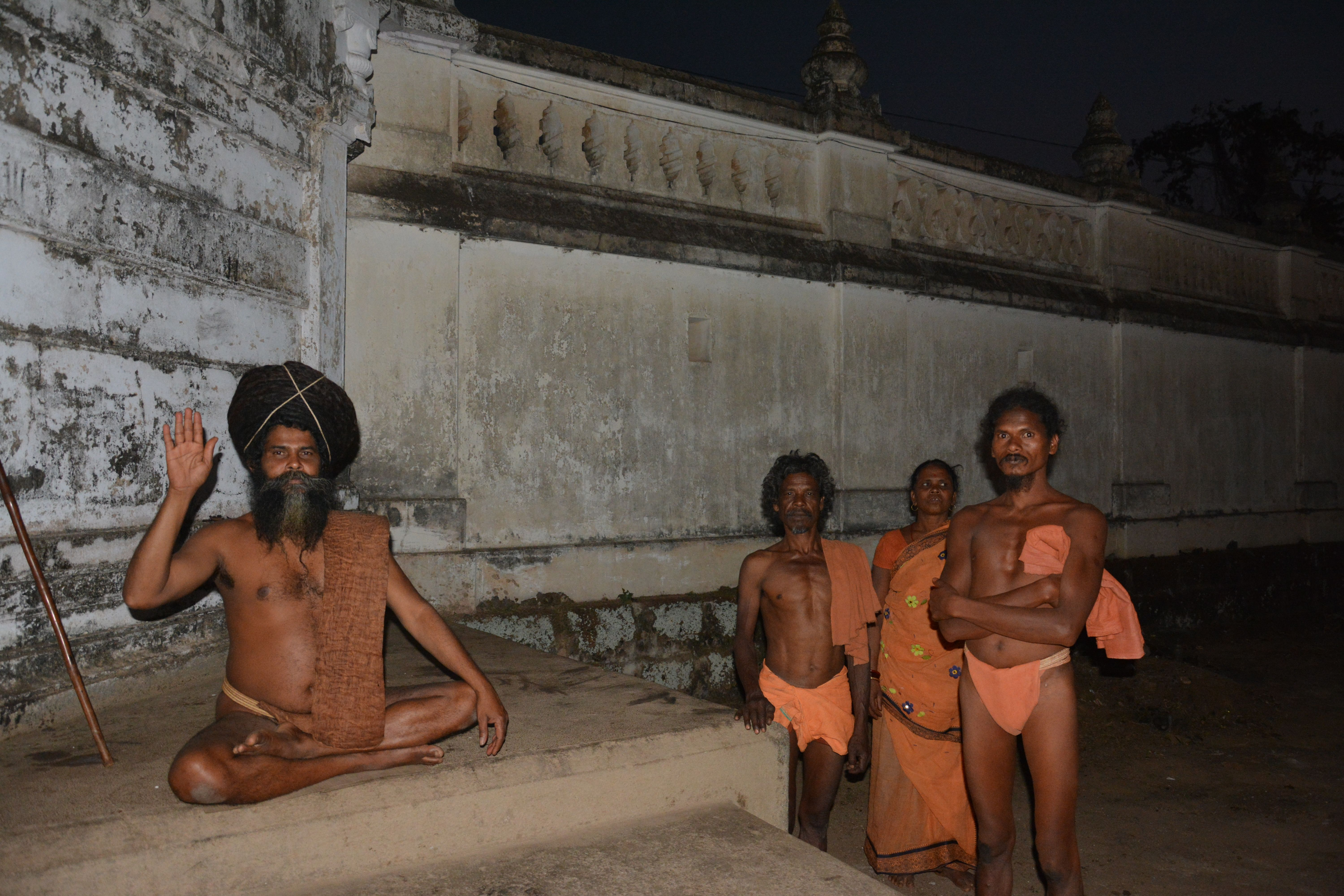
Devotee saying Alekh Brahma

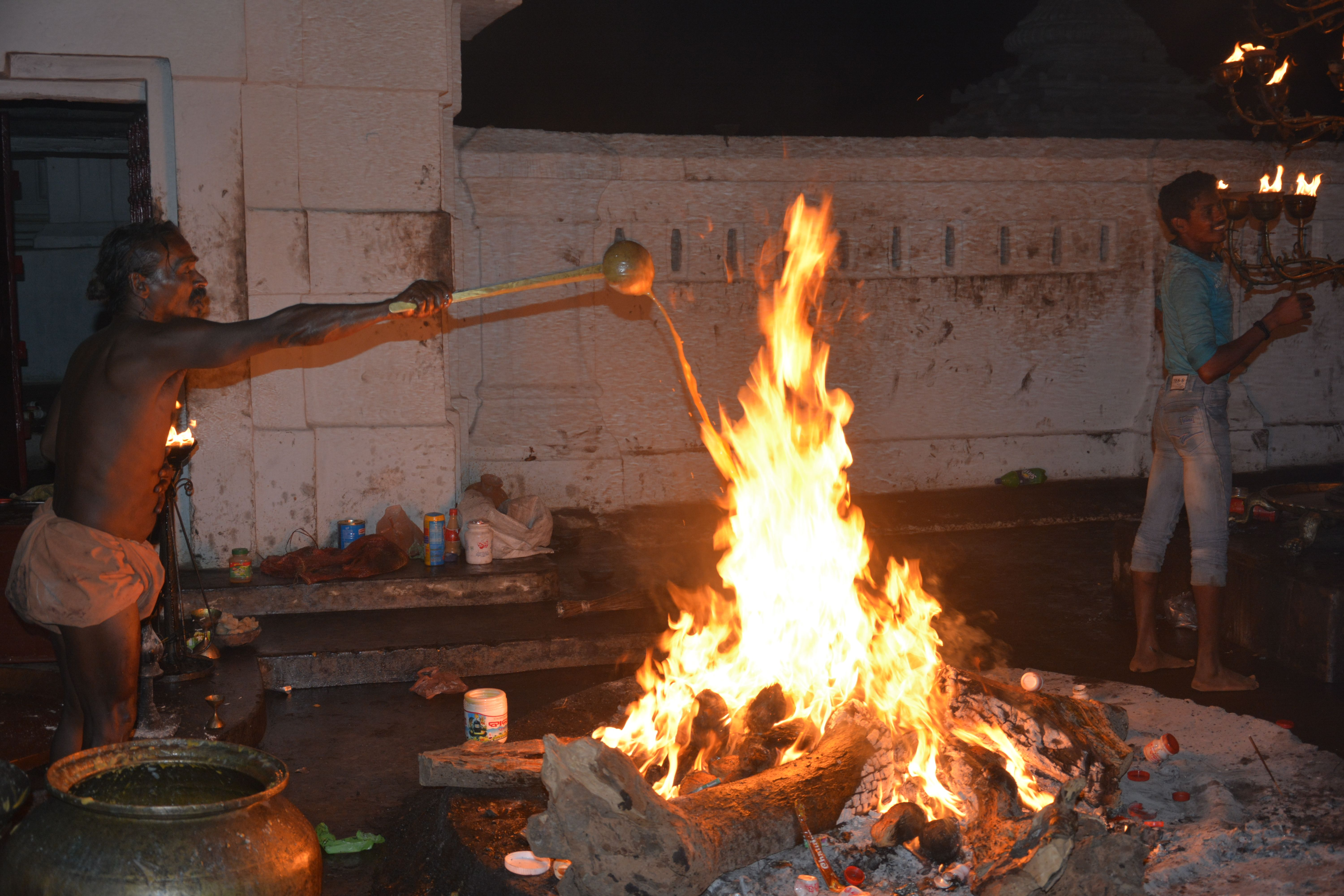
Famous rituals at Joranda mela

== See also ==
- Mahima Dharma
- Satya Mahima Dharma
