= Khaliapali =

- Village
- Location in Odisha, India Khaliapali (India)
- Coordinates: 20.89949596744771°N 83.7534532465778°E
- Country: India
- State: Odisha
- District: Subarnapur

Languages
  - Official: Odia
  - Local: Sambalpuri
- Time zone: UTC+5:30 (IST)
- Vehicle registration: OD
- Website: odisha.gov.in

Khaliapali is a census town in Subarnapur district in the Indian state of Odisha. Famous people from Khaliapali include the Khond saint Bhima Bhoi.

The Dussehra celebration (also known as Vijayadashami) is very grand here and it attracts thousands of worshippers from all across the district.

== Demographics ==
As of 2011 India census, Khaliapali had a population of 6865, up from 5257 in 2001. Males constitute 51% of the population and females 49%. Khaliapali has an average literacy rate of 72%. 13% of the population is under 7 years of age.
