= Satya Mahima Dharma =

Religious tradition from Indian state of Orrisa

Satya Mahima Dharma (the "dharma of the divine glory") is a religious tradition from Orissa. It goes back to a historic person called Mahima Svami (or Mahima Gosain).

He is said to have appeared in Puri in 1826. Dissatisfied with the ritualised idol worship of Lord Jagannath, he left Puri and travelled to the Kapilas hills near Dhenkanal, where he engaged himself in severe Yogic practices. In 1862, he became a siddha and started preaching a new dharma. He is said to have attained samadhi in 1876. Under his first disciple, Govinda Baba, and the dissident saint poet Bhima Bhoi, the movement shifted away from the coastal region towards the central and western parts of Odisha. Spreading also to other states (Madhya Pradesh, Andhra Pradesh, West Bengal, Assam), people from different regions and sociocultural backgrounds joined as followers. Since then, several monastic as well as lay currents and competing associations emerged and various regional centres (Joranda, Khaliapali) have been established. Mahima Dharma is a popular ascetic movement which considers the void, shunya, as the divine principle, opposing as such any idol worship. The void can only be venerated through fire, or its manifestation in the Sun, traits which link Mahima Dharma to the nirguna bhakti tradition.

== See also ==
- Mahima Dharma
- Joranda Gadhi
