= Mahima Dharma =

Hindu sect

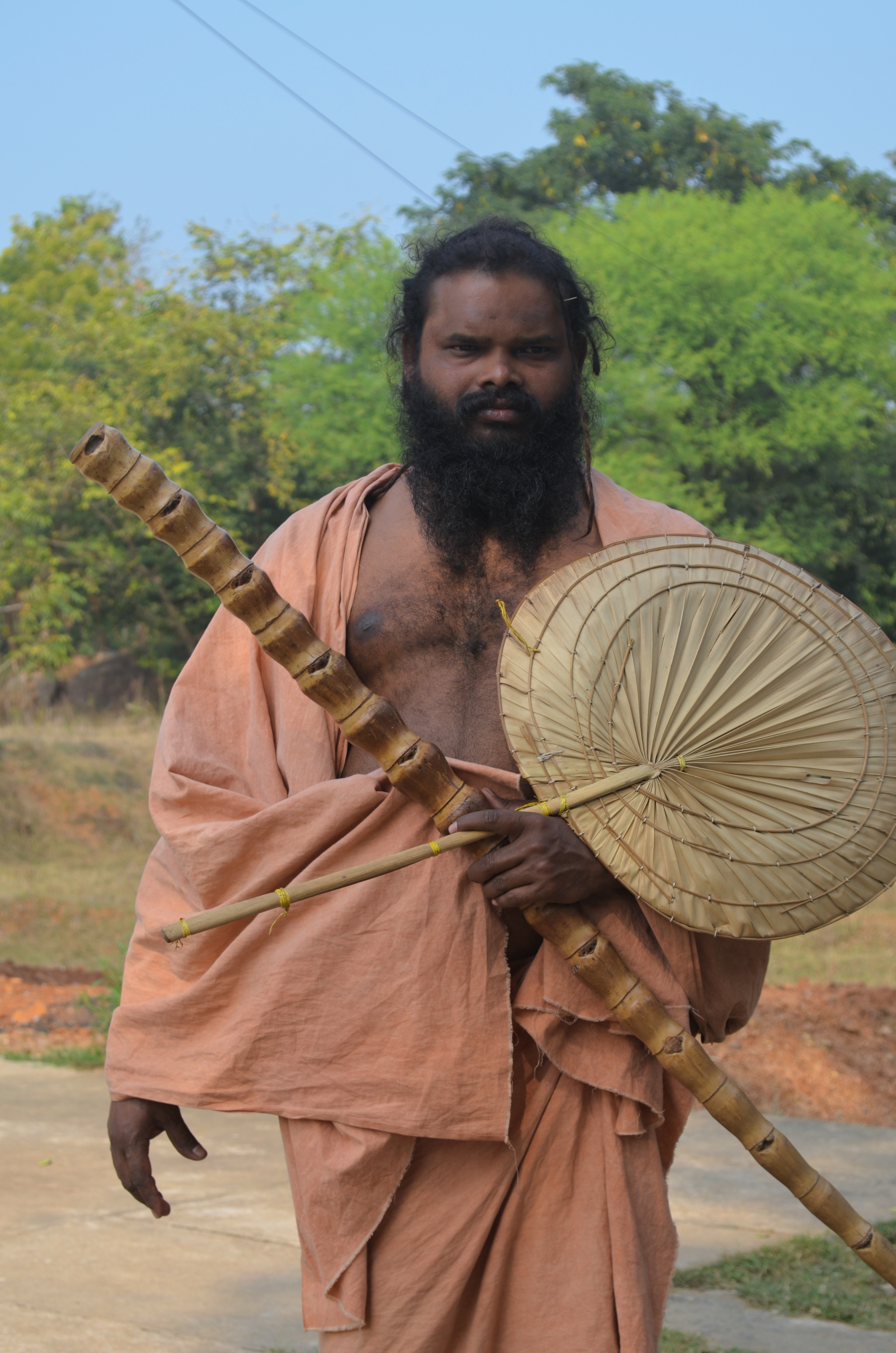
- A Mahima sadhu from Odisha with the characteristic barada badi, palm-leaf fan symbolic of Mahimaism
- Classification: Hindu sect
- Theology: Faith in ALEKH
- Region: Western Odisha and Central Odisha
- Headquarters: Mahima Gadi ମହିମା ଗଡ଼ି
- Founder: Prabuddha Guru Mahima Swami
- Origin: 1862 CE (after Mahima Swamy attained siddhi); Kapilasa Hill

Mahima Dharma (Odia: ମହିମା ଧର୍ମ) also known as Mahima Panth, is a Hindu sect practiced primarily in Odisha and nearby states. The religious movement was based on the worship of God, known as ALEKH, as attributeless; as condemnation of all religious customs set by the rich and upper-class society generally.

== Etymology ==
Alakh was used by sants (saint) and bhakts (worshippers) in the Bhakti era of India, including gurus Nanak and Kabir, who would chant, "Alakh Niranjan." Exclaiming the name of God (Sankirtan Yajna) was given prominence in all of the different ways of worship. Nathpanthis would also chant the same.

Alakh means "invisible" and Niranjan means "spotless", virtually the same.

Mahima Dharma is also known as Kumbhipatia, and its followed as Khumbupati. Devotees are also known as Alekhanamis, Alekhgirs, and Alekheyas.

== Founder ==
The founder of Mahima Dharma was Mahima Swami, or Mahima Gosain as he was also called. The first known report of Mahima Swami's existence was in 1867 in the newspaper Utkala Deepika in Orissa.

While Mahima Swami was his title, his name was Mukund Das, a Brahman. For many years, Mahima Gosain was in deep meditation in the caves at Himalaya. From there, Swami travelled to many regions and at last appeared in Puri (Odisha) in 1826 as Dhulia Gosain, where Swami settled on the dusty roads of Puri. People used to ask him queries on their well being and, surprisingly, it all happened to be true. It is believed once Swami was invited to Puri Mukti Mandap and there he confirmed Brahm (not Brahmā) is nirguna ("attributeless") and sunya ("void.")

From Puri Swami moved to hill caves of Khandagiri, Dhauligiri, Nilagiri etc. near Bhubaneswar (capital of Orissa state). During that period Swami lived on water alone for twelve years and people used to call him Nirahari Gosain. In 1838, Swami moved to Kapilash hill of Dhenkanal district of Orissa and spent twenty-one days in Atma Yoga Samadhi (unification of human mind) with balkal of the kumbhi tree (bark of careya arborea), leaving his clothes on a huge round stone. A great seven-hooded snake spread its hood covering his head. The nearby area of the forest was illuminated by the luster of the body of Swami. On the 21st day, a tribal, Sadananda of nearby Deogram village, witnessed the magnificent Atma Yoga Samadhi of Swami and served him fruits for twelve years during the stay of Swami at Kapilash hill. For this, Swami came to be known as Phalahari Gosain. The next twelve years Swami survived on cow's milk alone, rendered as service by the ruler of Dhenkanal, King Bhagirathi Bhramarbar Bahadur. Both the king and the queen had the opportunity to witness Swami on top of Kapilash hill and would serve him milk in new earthen pots.

Later, Swami moved to Kakanpada village of Rairakhol with his first disciple Sidha Govinda Baba. It is said he made an appearance to a blind Bhima Bhoi and blessed him with eyesight. Upon seeing the Swami, Bhima, with all his humbleness, prayed to the Swami to make him blind again as the torture of mankind was intolerable for him. Swami blessed him to compose a poem on Nirguna Brahma to spread the Mahima cult. After this, Swami retired back to Kapilash hill. Many believe the journey of Swami to Rairakhol was through air, not by foot.

After spending twelve years in Kapilash hill, Mahima Prabhu travelled around for twenty-four years as Brahmabadhuta (wandering mendicant of supreme order) and spread Mahima Dharma in Odisha and the neighboring states, before taking Samadhi at Joranda, Dhenkanal, of Odisha on the 10th day after the new moon of 1876. The place where Mahima Swami disappeared (merged Himself in the Mahanityapura) is called Mahima Gadi. It is the heart of all Mahima movement around world.

Preachers of the sect have been Brahmans and non-Brahmans. Gangadhar Das Mahanto (Brahman) and Ram Das Mahanto (Brahman) were promulgators.

== Beliefs ==
Mahima Dharma teaches belief in a single God (parambrahma or the supreme-soul who is formless and omnipresent) named Alekha.

Mahima Dharma became a powerful force for liberation in India because, as a traditional Indian religion, it stood uncompromising in its rejection of the caste system. Sri Bhima Bhoi, an initiate and ardent disciple of Mahima Swami who collected, disseminated and created bhajans from the teachings of Mahima Swami, was a Khond from Odisha.

The distinct and original teachings of Mahima Dharma are often conveyed using terms that may have an unrelated meaning in other Indian religious traditions. This has led scholars to see similarities between Mahima Dharma and, variously, the traditions of "crypto-Buddhism", Panchashakas, Jainism and Tantra.

Adherents reject idol worship as well as the Advaita tradition of Vaishnavism. Charity through the provision of food for those in need is an essential part of Mahima Dharma.

=== Harmony with mainstream deities ===
While the sect opposes the worship of God as any personalized deity, it does not criticize an anthropomorphised god. Bhim Bhoi himself in his Nirbeda Sadhana write of the existence of Lord Jagannath. To Bhima Bhoi again Ananta is an incarnation of Vishnu and identified with Mahima Swami. The Mahimapanthis and Bhima Bhoi in particular accept that Mahima Gosain is the incarnation of the ocean-dwelling Vishnu Lord Jagannath.

Many Mahima temples have a seven-hooded snake, alluding to Vishnu, but more particularly to Vishnu's serpent-guard, Vasuki.

== Practices ==
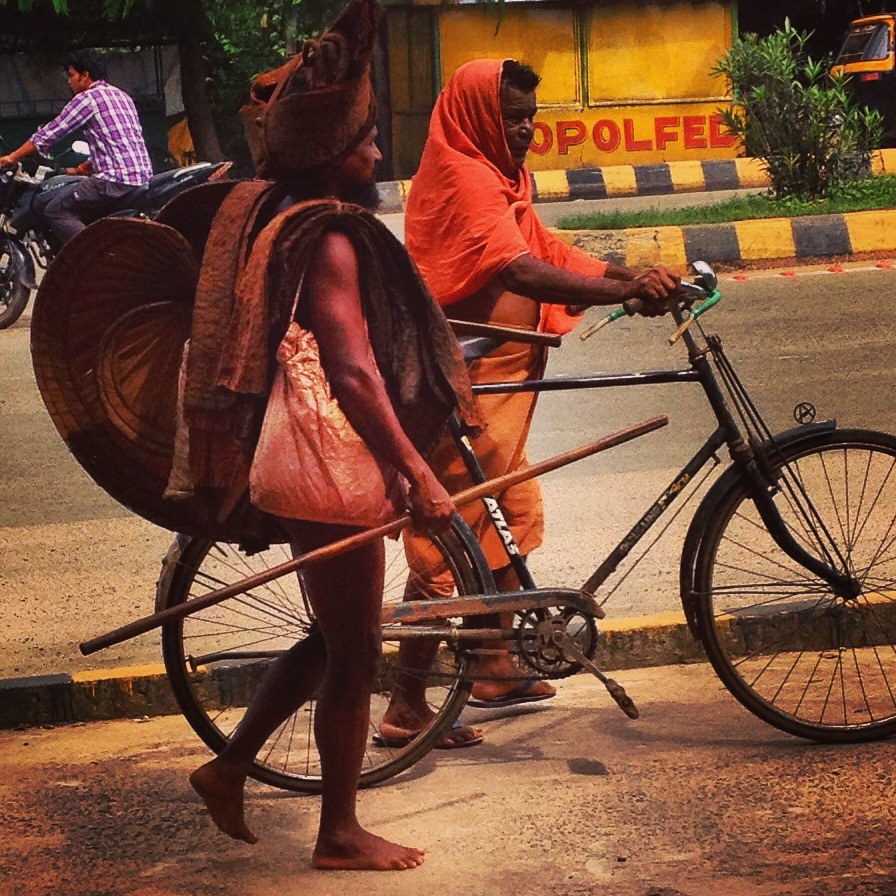
A Mahima Alekha monk walking on a Bhubaneswar road

The religion is essentially monistic in nature. Mahima religion strictly opposes the caste system and idol worship. The religion strictly forbids adultery, the consumption of any intoxicants, violence, and the consumption of any flesh. Food and water have to be taken before sunset. The Mahima devotee should rise around four in the morning and perform Sarana/Darsana before sunrise. Sarana/Darsana is the act of complete surrender of the self to Mahima Prabhu. The same is repeated three times a day including noon and evening before sunset. They are sometimes misinterpreted as followers of Surya, the Sun god, which is not true; they characterize their worship as that of the Supreme Lord of the indescribable grace (Alekha).

The religion has a monastic order, whose members, like Buddhist monks, do not constitute a priestly class and have no control over lay practitioners. They lead a life of poverty, celibacy, piety and constant movement, as the monks are not allowed to sleep in the same place on two consecutive nights nor take meals twice from the same house on any day. Acting on the strict order of the Mahima Swami to avoid any kind of idol worship, the followers of mahima dharma shunned the worship of Lord Jagannath. In 1881, a large number of iconoclastic followers of mahima dharma, from Sambalpur and Raipur, gathered in Jagannath Puri, reportedly seizing the three murtis and setting them afire on the Grand Trunk Road. A complaint was lodged and all the invaders were jailed.

To shed light on the Mahima as a sociocultural revolt against the Caste system, bearing a close resemblance to the Dalit Buddhist movement, Mayadhar Mansingh wrote in History of Oriya Literature: "This Mahima or Alekh religion does not recognise the caste system and is severely iconoclastic. It asks people to have faith only in the one invisible power that created this world and to worship Him and Him only. Except for its faith in a personal God, the tenets of this religion have remarkable resemblance to Buddhism. Many scholars indeed think that this Alekh religion is nothing but a revival of Buddhism in Orissa in a new garb."

== See also ==
- Satya Mahima Dharma
- Joranda Gadhi
- Sant Mat
- Contemporary Sant Mat movements
