= Subalaya =

Subalaya Sublia
- Town
- Location in Odisha, India Subalaya (India)
- Coordinates: 20°53′N 84°10′E
- Country: India
- State: Odisha
- District: Subarnapur

Area
  - Total: 3.32950 km^{2} (1.28553 sq mi)

Languages
  - Official: Odia
- Time zone: UTC+5:30 (IST)
- Vehicle registration: OD-31
- Nearest city: Birmaharajpur, Rairakhol
- Lok Sabha constituency: Balangir
- Climate: Rainy, hot, cold (Köppen)
- Avg. summer temperature: 45–50 °C (113–122 °F)
- Avg. winter temperature: 20–25 °C (68–77 °F)
- Website: odisha.gov.in

Subalaya is a town in the Birmaharajpur subdivision of Subarnapur district, Odisha, India. It is located on an island 822.738 acres (3.32950 km^{2}) in size at the confluence of the Mahanadi river and Surubalijora.

This town is home to Subalaya High School and Subalaya College.
