= Birmaharajpur =

Coordinates: 20°52′N 84°02′E

- Town
- Location within Odisha
- Country: India
- State: Odisha
- District: Subarnapur

Government
  - Type: Panchayat Samiti

Area
  - Total: 378.86 km^{2} (146.28 sq mi)
- Elevation: 160 m (520 ft)

Population (2011)
  - Total: 95,376
  - Density: 251.74/km^{2} (652.02/sq mi)

Languages
  - Official: Odia
  - Local: Sambalpuri
- Time zone: UTC+5:30 (IST)
- PIN: 767018
- Vehicle registration: OD- 31 (Sonepur)
- Nearest cities: Sonepur, Balangir, Sambalpur
- Lok Sabha constituency: Balangir
- Climate: Rainy, cold, and hot (Köppen)
- Avg. summer temperature: 42 °C (108 °F)
- Avg. winter temperature: 20 °C (68 °F)
- Website: odisha.gov.in

Birmaharajpur is a subdivision town of Subarnapur district in the state of Odisha, India. Birmaharajpur Subdivisional Headquarter is the Birmaharajpur town. It is located 22 km towards east from district headquarter Sonepur. It is a dispersed town and located on the left bank of the river Mahanadi. It is located about 229 km from state capital Bhubaneswar.

== Geography ==
=== Location and borders ===
It is located 19 km east of district headquarter Subarnapur.

Birmaharajpur subdivision is bounded by Boudh district towards South, Binika tehsil towards west, Rairakhol tehsil towards North Angul district towards east, Sonepur tehsil towards south-west. Phulabani, Balangir, Sambalpur, Burla, Anugul are the nearby cities to Birmaharajpur.

=== Administrative divisions ===
Birmharaj pur subdivision has administrative control over 13 gram panchayats and its 181 villages based on the 2011 census data.

It is at 160 metres (520 ft) elevation (altitude). The main places of this sub-division are Kenjhiriapali, Amarpali, Bagbar, deulmunda, Dantapali, Tithipali, Hillung, Jatesingha, Kalapathar, Khandahata, Kumarkeli, Luthurpank, Pitamahul, Ulunda, Dharmasala, Mursundhi, Champamal, Kendupali, Kamalpur, Deulmunda, and Nuagarh Subalaya.

== Politics ==
Current MLA of Birmaharajpur is Shri Raghunath Jagdala of the BJP Party. He was re-elected as the MLA for the Birmaharajpur area in 2024.

Birmaharajpur is a part of Balangir Lok Sabha constituency. The Member of Parliament is Sangeeta Singh Deo of the Bharatiya Janata Party. She was elected as the Member of Parliament in the year 2019.

== Tourism ==
- Patali Srikhetra, Kotsamalai

It is also called as the 2nd Jagannath temple. Present in the soul of untouched and dense forest lies the temple of Hindu lord Shree Jagganath. Legend says that when Kala pahad attacked the Jagannath temple in puri to loot ornaments and the lords Jagannath, Balabhadra and Suvadra. The king ordered the pandas to take the lords and go hide so as to prevent the Muslims from touching and looting Hindu lords. The pandas went towards western Odisha through the river Mahanadi in a boat taking the three lords and finally stopped in Sonepur district and hide the lords in the cave of hill Trikut of kotsamalai jungle for 143 years. The festival Rath Yatra is celebrated there and on the eve fair is organized with thousands of visitors visiting on the occasion.

During the winter (November–February) this place attracts many foreign birds, which generally come to Chilika Lake. Sometimes it is also possible to see elephants, bears or wolves in the nearby jungle at the dam site.

== See also ==
- Sonepur
- Boudh
- Subalaya
- Tebhapadar
- Pitamahul
