= Redhakhol =

Town in Odisha, India

Redhakhol ରେଢାଖୋଲ
- Town
- Rairakhol

ରେଢାଖୋଲ transcription(s)
- Shiba Mandir near Redhakhol
- Interactive map of Redhakhol
- Coordinates: 21.07°N 84.35°E
- Country: India
- State: Odisha
- District: Sambalpur

Government
  - Body: Notified Area Council

Area
  - Total: 35.8 km^{2} (13.8 sq mi)
- Elevation: 142 m (466 ft)

Population (2011)
  - Total: 15,379
  - Density: 430/km^{2} (1,110/sq mi)

Languages
  - Official: Odia
- Time zone: UTC+5:30 (IST)
- Postal Code: 768106
- Vehicle registration: OD15
- Website: redhakhol.in

Redhakhol (or Rairakhol) is a town and Notified Area Council in the Sambalpur district of Odisha, India. Serving as the sub-divisional headquarters for Rairakhol Sub-division, it is surrounded by a green belt of reserve forests, making it known for its natural beauty and pollution-free environment.

Located on National Highway 55, which connects Cuttack and Sambalpur, Redhakhol is a popular stop for travelers and buses passing through. It provides rest, food, and drinking water for those on the journey. The town also serves as a marketplace for nearby villages, where people gather to buy daily necessities and recreational items. Local farmers sell their agricultural products and forest goods at the Vegetable Market near Bhima Bhoi College.

In addition to being a commercial hub, Redhakhol is home to the Sub-Divisional Hospital, catering to the healthcare needs of the town and its surrounding areas. With its strategic location and natural charm, Redhakhol remains a key center for both trade and community services in the region.

== Geography ==
Redhakhol is situated at coordinates 21°04′N 84°21′E and has an average elevation of 142 meters (466 feet) above sea level. This location places it within the Sambalpur district of Odisha, offering a relatively moderate altitude and a landscape that blends rolling hills and fertile plains. The town's elevation contributes to its pleasant climate and its proximity to reserve forests, enhancing its natural beauty and air quality.

== History ==
During the British Raj, Redhakhol, formerly known as Rairakhol, was the capital of the Rairakhol State, one of the many princely states within the Eastern States Agency. The region played a significant role in the history of the area, with Rairakhol initially being a feudatory state under the Bamra State until the 18th century. As a princely state, Rairakhol had its own rulers and maintained a degree of autonomy, though it was ultimately under British suzerainty.

The state was known for its local governance and the strategic importance of its location in the region. After the integration of princely states into modern India post-independence, Rairakhol, now known as Redhakhol, evolved into the town we recognize today, retaining much of its historical significance. The legacy of its royal past can still be seen in the town's architecture and local culture.

== Demographics ==
As of the 2011 Census of India, Redhakhol had a population of 15,379. Males accounted for 52% of the population, while females made up 48%. The town has a literacy rate of 73%, which is higher than the national average of 59.5%. Male literacy stands at 79%, while female literacy is 65%, reflecting a noticeable gender gap in education.

Additionally, 14% of the population is under the age of 6, indicating a significant young population. This demographic data highlights the growing population and the progress in literacy within the town, though there is still room for improvement in gender equality in education.

== Financial Institutions/Banks ==
- State Bank of India (SBI)
- Bank of Baroda (BoB)
- Axis Bank
- HDFC Bank
- Union Bank of India
- Canara Bank
- UCO Bank
- Central Bank of India
- Utkal Grameen Bank
- DCB Bank

== Connectivity ==
Redhakhol is situated on National Highway 55, 67 km south of Sambalpur and 220 km west of Bhubaneswar. The completion of the Kiakata Bridge on the Rairakhol-Kiakata State Highway has made it a key junction, offering direct routes to Boudh, Phulbani, and Brahmapur. The town is also 88 km south of Deogarh, which connects to the Ranchi-Vijayawada Highway. Additionally, Rairakhol railway station links the town to major cities across India, ensuring strong connectivity by both road and rail.

== Education ==
Redhakhol is home to a variety of educational institutions catering to different levels of learning. Bhima Bhoi College, affiliated with Sambalpur University, offers Degree and Higher Secondary courses in Science, Humanities, and Commerce. Goura Chandra High School, established in 1947, is one of the oldest schools in Redhakhol, providing secondary education.

Additionally, Prabhujee English Medium School offers primary, secondary, and higher secondary education and is affiliated with CBSE. Other notable schools in the area include Rampur Sadar Primary School, Rani Annapurna Girls' High School, Saraswati Shishu Vidya Mandir, Sri Aurobindo Institute of Integral Education, and Odisha Adarsha Vidyalaya.

== Politics ==
Redhakhol is part of the Rairakhol Assembly constituency and the Sambalpur Parliamentary constituency. The current Member of Legislative Assembly (MLA) from this seat is Prasanna Acharya of the Biju Janata Dal (BJD).
