= The Enchanted Brahmin's Son =

Indian fairy tale

The Enchanted Brahmin's Son is an Indian story contained in the ancient literary work Panchatantra, about the marriage between a human maiden and a Brahmin's son born as a snake, who becomes human and has his snakeskin destroyed.

The tale is part of the more general cycle of the Animal as Bridegroom, and is classified in the Aarne–Thompson–Uther Index as tale type ATU 433B, a type that deals with maidens disenchanting serpentine husbands. (Note: German folklorist Hans-Jörg Uther, in his own revision of the folktale index, in 2004, subsumed previous types AaTh 433, AaTh 433A and AaTh 433C under only one type, ATU 433B.)

== Publication ==
=== Sources ===
The tale is sourced to a recension of Pancatantra by one Purnabhadra.

=== Translations ===
Sanskritologist Theodor Benfey translated the tale to German with the title Der verzauberte Brahmanensohn ("The Enchanted Brahmin's Son"), as part of his translation of the Panchatantra. The tale was also translated to English as The Girl who Married a Snake, by Arthur William Ryder, The Maiden that Wedded a Snake, and The Maiden wedded to a Snake, by Penguin Books India.

== Summary ==
In the city of Radschagriha, or Radjagriha (Palace City, in another translation), a Brahmin named Devasarman (translated as Godly, in an English translation) lives with his wife. The couple worry for not having a child, since their neighbours have their children. One day, Devasarman tells his wife he made a sacrifice for a future child, and they receive a prediction that their son will surpass other in beauty and virtue. Devasarman's wife fills her heart with happiness. However, she becomes pregnant and gives birth to a snake. People want her to get rid of the snake, but Devasarman and his wife treat it as their son and feed him with milk and butter.

The snake son grows up in days. Devasarman's wife sees a neighbour's son having his wedding banquet and complains to Devasarman that they should arrange one for their own son. Devasarman retorts that he can go to the depths of the underworld and ask King Vasuki for a snake wife for their son, since no one would marry their daughter to snake. The woman is sad at the words, so Devasarman departs to another country called Kukutanagara and spends the night at another Brahmin's house. The following morning, the Brahmin friend asks Devasarman about the reason for his journey, and, after learning the man is looking for a wife for his son, mentions his own daughter as potential bride.

Devasarman agrees with his Brahmin friend, and brings the girl back home with him with a retinue. When the bride's retinue arrives, they overhear the locals lamenting that she is unaware she is marrying a snake. The bride's retinue informs the bride to stop the wedding at once and return home. The bride says that this was no fraud, and this is her destiny as it is ordained, that it cannot be changed by wisemen or gods. The girl decides to go through with the wedding and marries the snake. She treats the snake as a husband and feeds with milk.

One night, the snake leaves the basket where it sleeps in and crawls on the girl. She senses something, wakes up and notices a stranger in the room with her. She goes to rush out of the room, but the person assuages her that he is her husband, then enters into the snakeskin he left inside the basket to prove he is the same person as the snake. He leaves the snakeskin covered with diadems and richly ornated. The human snake and his bride spend the night together. The following morning, Devasarman has witnessed the events and goes to burn his son's snakeskin he left inside the basket, turning him human permanently. Devasarman introduces his now human son to his family.

== Analysis ==
=== Tale type ===
The tale can be classified in the international Aarne-Thompson Index, as tale type AaTh 433, The Prince as Serpent, a type connected to the Danish story of the King Lindworm: a barren queen gives birth to a son in snake form who is disenchanted by removing or destroying his snakeskin.

However, in his own revision of the folk type index, published in 2004, German folklorist Hans-Jörg Uther subsumed types AaTh 433 ("The Prince as Serpent"), AaTh 433A ("A Serpent Carries a Princess to Its Castle") and AaTh 433C under a new type: ATU 433B, "King Lindworm". Tale type ATU 433B, "King Lindworm", is part of the cycle of the Animal as Bridegroom, stories that involve a human maiden marrying a prince in animal form and disenchanting him.

== Variants ==
=== India ===
In a manuscript titled Dhermángada Cheritra, attributed to an author named Nrisinha Kavi, the king of Kanakapuri, in Kashmir, called Dhermangada, has a snake for a son that is born by his wife, which they keep hidden. The king of Sauráshtra arranges for his daughter's marriage to Dhermangada's son, unaware of the prince's true nature. The princess goes to Kashmir to marry her husband when she reaches the appropriate age for their marriage, and learns her husband is a snake, to her grief. Still, she takes her husband to pilgrimages and holy shrines like a wife with her husband, at Jagannáth, Sriranga and Brahma kunda at Dhermapur. At Dhermapur, the princess is instructed by a voice from heaven to douse the snake in a reservoir. This turns the snake into a human prince. The couple return to Kashmir, where King Dhermangada learns of the events and names the princess Satyavati and his son Chitrángada. Danish scholar Axel Olrik sourced the manuscript to the Telugu language.

In a Ladakh tale titled The Snake-Prince, a couple named Donyo Dorje and Belsa are always quarrelling against each other and fighting. One day, Donyo Dorje brings home a cloth and is vehemently scolded by his wife, who warns him never to set foot home again. The man leaves the house and falls asleep under a tree. Hours later, he is woken up by a duststorm and goes to check on his bag, finding a black snake inside. The snake hisses at him and slithers to his house, and follows the snake in. The snake hides itself in the storeroom of the house, and the couple, fearing the animal, take a peek inside the store: inside, they find a human baby boy named Tsarong, who explains he has come to live with them. The couple adopt the baby and raise him, although Tsarong crawls back into the snakeskin to sleep in the store. After a week, Tsarong reaches adulthood and asks his father to win the local king's daughter as his wife. Donyo Dorje goes to the king on his son's behalf to court princess Drolma, but he king expels him. In retaliation, every water source in the kingdom dries up overnight. The king summons the lamas to pray for a solution. They also find a large stone blocking the flow of the largest spring which they remove, to no avail. Suddenly, a voice tells them the waters will flow again if the king gives his daughter Drolma in marriage. After the king agrees to it, the water flows again. The king arranges for the wedding, but demands his prospective son-on-law brings fine presents for every guest at the ceremony. Tsarong is told of the king's last demands and tells his father to carry three bags to the wedding: one with hay, the other with broken pottery, and the third with stones. Donyo and Tsarong arrive at the wedding and the king orders the pair to produce scarves (which is produced from the bag of hay), gold and silver (which are taken from the broken pottery) and finally precious gems (which the stones turn to). Finally, Tsarong marries princess Drolma. Time passes, and there is a fair in the neighbouring country. Tsarong, in snakeskin, asks his parents and wife to go. After they depart, Tsarong comes out of the snakeskin, becomes a handsome youth and rides a white horse to the join the fair. He dazzles the guests with his beauty, then returns to his parents' house to crawl back into the snakeskin. Tsarong's parents and wife returns and comment with the reptile the stranger at the fair. This happens for a second time: Tsarong sends his family ahead of him, turns into human shape and rides the horse into the fair. One day, princess Drolma asks her mother-in-law about the mysterious youth, and Belsa reveals the rider is Tsarong, and she should burn his animal disguise while he is at the fair. Princess Drolma rushes back home and burns the snakeskin. At the same time, Tsarong, in human form, senses a burning over his body and faints. His mother sprinkles some milk on him and he comes to. Princess Drolma returns to the fair and Tsarong thanks her for releasing him from his curse by burning the snakeskin. Tsarong then assumes the throne after his father-in-law.

Stuart Blackburn collected a tale from an Apatani source. In this tale, titled The Two Sisters: A Snake-Husband, a snake comes out of a cave and becomes human by shedding its skin. Meanwhile, two girls, Biinyi and Biine, steal the fruits from a takun tree that belongs to the snake. The snake, in human form, tells them that he will marry them if they take the fruits. The girls' parents place necklace on their daughters: a rite bead on Biinyi, the good one, and one made of eggshells on Biine, the bad one. Biine slips and sinks in the mud, while Biinyi marries the snake and gives birth to a son. Her husband becomes a snake by night and human by day, and Biinyi complains about this state of affairs. One day, when her snake-son was grown up, she asks him to fetch his father's snakeskin and give it to her. Biinyi destroys the snakeskin without her husband knowing. The snake husband returns home and wants to crawl inside the snakeskin, but cannot find it. Biinyi spins a story that their son burnt in the fire of their hearth and she tried to rescue the skin, but failed. Thus, Biinyi's husband becomes human permanently, and women don't eat snake meat, nor marry snakes.

In a Himalayan titled A Girl and her Snake Husband, a man has a wife he deems to be useless and foolish and expels her from their house. The woman lives by begging for alms, then finds a stick-like snake which she places in a basket. The snake grows up and she moves the snake from small baskets, then returns home to live in secrecy and hides the snake in a barn. The man learns his wife returned, but lets her stay. The woman also lies that she gave birth to a son, and asks for a three storey house for him. The snake occupies the space of the entire building. The woman then tells her Brahman husband their son is grown up and should be married. Despite his reservations about anyone marrying a snake son, he goes to look for a bride for his son, only finding a poor Brahman's orphan daughter. The snake's Brahman father pays the girl's mother her a bride price and brings. The girl marries the snake son. She grows up and the mother-in-law advises the girl to apply oil to the snake's body, then to sit at the place the snake reserves for her. For the next few days, the snake leaves space for his human bride in their house. On the fourth day, the snake leaves half of the bed for her, then removes his snakeskin to become a handsome man. The girl goes to inform the snake's mother about her son's transformation to man, but when the woman goes to check she finds a snake, so the woman advises the girl to burn his snakeskin and her bodice. The girl takes the removed snakeskin and burns it, but accidentally leaves a piece of snakeskin. The now human snake husband wakes up and asks his wife about the snakeskin, but she feigns ignorance and goes to her bring her mother-in-law to see him. However, the husband finds the remaining skin, which he enlarges and covers himself with it, becoming a snake again. On the sixth day, the woman tells the girl to burn the snakeskin again, this time more carefully, along with her bodice. It happens thus. The now human snake man wakes up and cannot find any trace of the snakeskin. His human wife feigns ignorance that she does not know who took the skin and her bodice. The girl brings her mother-in-law to see the human son.

In a Assamese tale titled The Snake Prince, a great king rules Assam in fairness and his subjects are happy. He also has a beautiful wife and a beautiful daughter who is endowed with many virtues. However, despite her virtues and character, the princess is still unmarried, something that concerns the king. The monarch talks to the primie minister, who sends messengers to gather biodate of potential suitors among princes and nobles, but they do not fit the princess's high bridal standards. He then confers with astrologers and magicians to predict the princess's husband, but they give contradictory views. Lastly, a young magician advises the royal family to follow his instructions: they should wake up early in the morning and bathe in a stream after the full moon. It happens thus, and soon a handsome prince appears to court the princess. The prince says he is from the underground world and has knowledge of all subjects. The princess tests him, who passes her trials, and she is satisfied. The princess decides to marry the mysterious prince, who says that he will come in the night and leave by dawn, so the marriage rituals should adjust for that. They follow his terms and the princess marries him, despite concerns that the prince is a ghost or a demon. The princess lives with him, but she is still curious about her husband's vanishing every morning. Eventually, the princess gives birth to a son, and one day follows her husband to the forest in the morning. After she loses him in the forest, the child crawls after his father and finds the prince entering a python skin and slithering away. At night, the princess and her child return to the forest and see the prince coming out of the python skin and making his way to the palace. The princess and her son burn the snakeskin, despite the prince's objections, keeping him in human form forever and preventing him from meeting his snake relatives ever again. The prince rules Assam with his wife and son.

=== Sri Lanka ===
In a Sri Lankan tale with the Sinhalese title නාග කුමාරයා ("Naga Son of the King") and translated to Russian as "Принц-нага" ("Prince-Naga"), a sitana man (a treasurer) lives with his wife in wealthy, but has no children. His wife laments about their childlessness, so he consults a shastra scholar and asks about if it is in his destiny to have a child. The scholar advises that he should offer a sacrifice to the gods and if they accept, he might be granted a son. Thus, the sitana man and his wife make a pilgrimage to teh temple and make sacrifices. After months, a god announces him that the sitana shall have a handsome and virtuous son, the couple's happiness. However, his wife gives birth to a young snake. The midwife and the women try to kill the snake baby, but his mother forbids it, insisting that it is her son, so she raises him like a human baby. Eventually, the snake son grows up, but his human father pays no attention for the creature, due to his shame at his son's birth. The sitana's wife notices that in the neighbouring house wedding preparations are underway, and she comments with the sitana about finding a bride for their son. The sitana questions that, if their son is a snake, he should descend to the Naga realm in search of the Nāga King's daughter as his bride. The woman denies that their son is a snake, but a sitana, so they should find a human bride like they do in their land. It was custom for the bridegroom not to be shown to his bride until the wedding, but the sitana ponders about bringing a girl to marry a snake. Still, he decides to go through with it and travels afar. He reaches a distant land and meets another sitana, who welcomes the first one to his house. After he discloses the reason for his travels, the second sitana reveals that his own daughter has come of age and he is also looking for a bridegroom for her. A marriage is arranged between both families, and the first sitana brings back the princess accompanied by her handmaidens. After the group returns to the sitana's lands, people begin to lament the princess's arrival, since she is betrothed to a serpent. The handmaidens learn about this, and mourn for the princess, who has none of it and admits she is destined for such a naga husband. They celebrate the wedding and the princess treats the naga bridegroom as one would a human, and they move to their own house. One night, the princess is approached by a handsome youth in her sleep, and she questions his identity. The youth says he is her husband, but she is skeptical about it and bids him leave. Thus, to prove his claims, he points to the serpent skin in bed, crawls inside it and turns into the naga husband, then returns to human form. The princess is convinced and embraces her husband. The naga son's father, the sitana, learns of his son's transformation and burns the snakeskin the next day.

== Legacy ==
According to professor Channabasappa S. Patil, sculptures of a well in Sirival, an archaeological site in Karnataka, depict scenes from the story.

== See also ==
- Champavati
- Princess Himal and Nagaray
- The Snake Prince
- The Story of Halahal Kumar
- The Story of Hira and Lal
- Tulisa, the Wood-Cutter's Daughter
- The Wax Prince
- The Ruby Prince
- Prince Lal Maluk
