= Prince Lal Maluk =

Pakistani Sindhi folktale about a serpent bridegroom

Prince Lal Maluk (Sindhi: "شهزادو لال ملوڪ") is a Pakistani folktale from Sindh and published by Sindhologist Nabi Bakhsh Baloch, about the marriage between a human maiden and a bridegroom of supernatural origin; she betrays his trust, and has to search for him. The tale is a local form of the international cycle of the Animal as Bridegroom or The Search for the Lost Husband, in that a woman marries a man of supernatural origin (a snake or serpent), loses him and must regain him.

== Summary ==
In a certain land, a woodcutter earns his living by selling wood and herding cattle, and is endlessly hounded by his nagging wife about their poor situation. One day, some people from his village are leaving to seek new jobs elsewhere, and the woodcutter's wife forces him to accompany the others. At a point in the journey, the group stops to rest. The next morning, the woodcutter wakes up and notices a snake crawled into his satchel, and he decides to return to the village and use the snake to mercy kill his wife and children. He goes back home and places the snake inside a pot of flour, then leaves not to watch the deed. His wife goes to fetch some flour and finds a shiny necklace inside it, instead of the snake. The woman takes the necklace to a jeweler, and is paid handsomely for it. The woodcutter, meanwhile, is waiting for news of his wife's death, but, instead, he is visited by his children, who are trying to call him for dinner. After the children come and go, he decides to check for himself if his wife is dead, and finds his house furnished with food, clothes and tools. Suspecting some cheating on her part at first, the woodcutter is told of the necklace his wife sold to the jeweler, and goes to talk to him. He lies to the jeweler the necklace was to be a gift for the king, and threatens to tell the king about it. The jeweler pays for his silence and himself goes to give the necklace to the king.

The king gives the necklace to his queen, which she uses and puts it away. Days later, she orders for a servant to fetch the necklace, and the servant tells the queen the necklace is gone, and a baby boy is in its place. The queen goes to check for herself and cradles the baby. The king appears soon after and sees the baby for himself. The royal couple decide to adopt the baby and name him Lal Maluk. Years later, the king sends his ministers to arrange a marriage to a prospective bride on behalf of the prince, but the king dies while the minister is on the road. Lal Maluk assumes the throne and is warned by a fakir that his minister has traitorous intentions and wants to usurp marry Lal Maluk's fiancée. Lal Maluk rushes to his fiancée's side and shows him a letter with his picture, while the traitorous minister tries to arrange a marriage between his own son and the princess who is to be Lal Maluk's wife. Lal Maluk and the princess saddle some horses and flee the kingdom.

The couple make way to another city and Lal Maluk advises his fiancée to put on male attire, while he goes to buys provisions for the road. He enters a shop to buy some food, when the female shopkeeper ties a thread around his neck and turns him into a lamb. Back to the princess, she senses something wrong happened to Lal Maluk and enters the city disguised as man. She soon learns there is an archery contest for the hand of the local princess. Lal Maluk's fiancée wins at the archery contest and marries the princess, introducing himself as "Prince Lal Maluk". Husband and wife live together, but cannot consummate the marriage. The she-prince goes to buy a parrot in the market to keep her company in the palace, as suspicions of her true gender start to mount, due to the minister poisoning the king's ear with rumours. The minister tries to unmask her gender by setting tests (choosing a flower, preferring sweet food to salted one, undressing to take a bath in the river, and patrolling the streets near the shops of women's wares), which she passes with the help of the parrot. Defeated, the minister betrothes his own daughter to "him".

The she-prince buys a lamb which she finds in a store, and undoes the magic on the real Lal Maluk by pulling a thread from the lamb's neck. They trade places, and Lal Maluk goes to marry the local princess and the local minister's daughter as his co-wives, who, after being told of the whole event, decide to keep a secret between them. Life goes on, until one day, while Lal Maluk is away, an old woman appears at the palace - Lal Maluk's snake mother in human disguise - and convinces them to ask Lal Maluk's caste. After the woman leaves, the princess asks Lal Maluk his caste. He deflects the question in an anger. The next day, she repeats the question, and Lal Maluk takes both girls to the riverbank, and questions the girls' insistence to know his caste. He dips his feet in the water and warns them that what they will see is him: he turns into a snake and swims away. The palace tries to cover the fact by saying that Lal Maluk is on a hunt, and try to capture his snake shape, while the princesses mourn for the loss of their husband.

Later, Lal Maluk's first wife learns that on a certain night, in a certain day, some music begins to sound underneath a tree, and decides to see it for herself. She goes to the tree and finds a little snake. The reptile turns into Lal Maluk, and explains his spiritual guide is preventing him from escaping, but she can save him: she is to come to the place on the fourteenth day of the month, when his spiritual guide comes with his retinue, clean up the path and serve sweet milk, and beat the drum ("tabla", in the original) in front of his spiritual guide; in gratitude, his spiritual guide will be pleased and ask her for a reward, to which she is to ask for Lal Maluk. The princess does as Lal Maluk has asked: she waits for the 14th day, prepares the place for the coming of the retinue, and joins the others musicians in the presentation they make for the "spiritual guide" (who is described as a jinn in the text). The princess goes to fill in for the previous drummer and does a number in front of the spirit, who is delighted and pleased by the music and allows the princess to ask for a reward. She asks for the hand of Lal Maluk, which is agreed upon: the prince resumes his human form and departs with his human wife.

Reunited with his three co-wives, Lal Maluk misses his mother and plans to return with his fathers-in-law's armies to his home kingdom. He sets up a tent on the outskirts of town and inquires the citizens about the minister's rule; they answer they want their rightful king. Lal Maluk threaten to make war with the minister lest he surrenders the throne. The minister renounces and flees the city with his son, while Lal Maluk regains his kingdom and reunites with his mother.

== Analysis ==
=== Tale type ===
The tale belongs to the international cycle of "The Search for the Lost Husband", according to the international Aarne-Thompson-Uther Index, catalogued under the umbrella tale type ATU 425. In Stith Thompson and Warren Roberts's Types of Indic Oral Tales, the tale is classified under its own Indic type, 425D Ind, "Search for Serpent Husband": the heroine marries a man of mysterious origin; jealous women probe her into asking his name or origins; he reveals it and turns into a snake; after many hardships, she reunites with him. (Note: The word "Indic" refers to tale types that, although not registered in the Aarne-Thompson-Uther international index, exist in the oral and written literature of these three South Asian countries.)

=== Motifs ===
The protagonist's name, Lal, means "ruby".

==== The husband's transformations ====
According to Stith Thompson and Jonas Balys study of motifs of Indian literature and oral folklore, the tale contains the motifs D425.1.3. "Transformation: snake to garland", B604.1, "Marriage to snake" and D391 "Transformation: serpent (snake) to person".

The sequence where prince Lal Maluk turns into a ram by the use of the thread and his later release appears in an Indic tale type incorporated in Thompson's 1961 revision of the international Aarne-Thompson Index. In this type, AaTh 977, "The Eloping Couple and the Robbers", after a series of adventures between the prince and his princess, he is turned into an animal by a witch. However, German folklorist Hans-Jörg Uther, in his 2004 revision of the international index, discontinued the typing.

==== The husband's vanishing ====
In his work about Cupid and Psyche and other Animal as Bridegroom tales, Swedish scholar Jan-Öjvind Swahn identified that, in certain tales, the heroine causes her supernatural husband's disappearance by inquiring his name. Swahn named this motif The Name Taboo and surmised that it occurred "primarily in India". In Thompson and Roberts's Types of Indic Oral Tales, this motif appears in Indic type 425D Ind, "Search for Serpent Husband": the heroine insists to know her husband's caste or name, and he, in return, gives her an answer, but vanishes in the water like a snake. This episode corresponds with motifs C32.2., "Tabu: questioning supernatural husband"; C32.2.1, "Tabu: asking name of supernatural husband"; C32.2.2, "Tabu: asking where supernatural husband comes from", and C32.2.3, "Tabu: asking for caste of supernatural husband."

== Variants ==
=== Prince Lal and Princess Hira (Sindhi) ===
In a Sindhi tale published by Sindhologist Nabi Bakhsh Baloch with the title "Prince Lal and Princess Hira" (Sindhi: "لعل بادشاھ ۽ هيرا راڻي"), a poor woodcutter is walking home, when he is attacked by a snake. He throws a bundle of wood at it to kill it, and his wife finds a ruby necklace under the wood, which they sell to the king the next morning. The king, Gharib Kathir, gives the necklace to his wife to wear, which she keeps in a golden purse. One day, the king asks his wife to see the necklace, and the queen goes to retrieve it, but finds a human baby in its place. They decide to adopt the baby whom they name 'Lal' (ruby) Shahzad and raise him.

Years later, Prince Lal grows up a handsome youth, and decides to marry one as beautiful as himself, but rejects many prospective brides. A princess named Hira, in another land, beautiful as he is, also rejects her suitors, and learns of Prince Lal, who is himself in a similar situation. Princess Hira is introduced to Lal, both develop a fondness for each other and are eventually married. However, their happiness is short-lived, for a one-eyed girl named Kani, spurned by Prince Lal, plans to hinder their lives: she knows Lal's true origin as a snake, and pays Hira a visit. She then convinces the princess to ask Lal about his caste.

Princess Hira asks her husband Lal about his caste, but he dismisses the question, knowing it will only bring her misfortune. Still, she continues to ask him about his origins, and he decides to tell her. He brings her next to a river and bids her to drop her inquiries, but jumps into the water, turns into a snake, and slithers away. Princess Hira cries for her vanishing husband, and her grief is heard by an overflying Noor Pari. The fairy descends to comfort Hira and says she will search for clues about Prince Lal's whereabouts.

Some days later, Noor Pari flies back to Princess Hira and reveals the intel she has gathered: Lal is the son of the king of snakes who has fled home to the human world in a human shape, and the king of the snakes, in human form, goes to a certain place in order to enjoy dance and music. Hira can rescue her husband by doing a number in front of the human king of the snakes and asking for Lal as reward. The fairy then walks Princess Hira to the place where the snake husband and his retinue gather, and they watch the scenes unfold before the monarch. Hira walks into the event and asks the snake if she can perform a song and dance for him. The snake king consents and the princess performs with such talent it moves the snake king, so much so he asks Hira what she wants as a reward. Hira dismisses the request for the time.

The snake king appears with his retinue for a second event on a later day, Hira dances for him again, and the snake king asks her again. Some time later, the snake king appears for the third time to watch Hira's dance, and finally Hira answers truthfully. The snake king then takes the human princess to his palace to show her Prince Lal, lying on a bed. Lal and Hira reunite, and the snake king sends them back to the human realm for good.

=== The Ruby Prince (Pakistani Punjabi) ===
Pakistani writer and poet Shafi Aqeel published a Pakistani Punjabi tale titled Laal Shahzada in Urdu, which was translated into English as Prince Ruby by writer Ahmad Bashir. In this tale, a poor woodcutter forages for berries for his family and finds a large and shining one (a ruby), which he takes home. His family eats the edible berries, while they notice the shine of the large ruby (which the story keeps referring to as a "berry"). His wife suggests he shows it to the king, who notices that it is a rare ruby and buys it from the woodcutter as a gift for the queen. At night, she places the ruby under her pillow, but, in the morning, the gem has vanished, and in its place a baby has appeared. (Note: This element is classified, according to Stith Thompson and Jonas Balys study of motifs of Indian literature and oral folklore, as motif D432.3.1 "Transformation: ruby to person".) The royal couple adopt the baby. At the same time, the vizier's wife gives birth to a baby daughter, and it is decided to marry them to each other when they come of age. Both grow up together and later marry, the king's son, named Prince Ruby, assumes the throne when his father dies. Some time later, an old hag comes to the palace and sells curds for the princess. However, Prince Ruby comes in the same time and expels the old hag, warning his wife to not see her again. Time passes, and the old hag returns, this time with beautiful bangles to sell. The princess buys some which the hag helps her put on, but the ornaments drop to the ground and break apart, which saddens the princess. The hag notices this and poses a question to her about her husband's caste. The princess tries to deflect the question, but the hag presses the issue, mentioning that Prince Ruby keeps the girl at a distance at night. Moved by her words, the princess's mind wanders to her husband's strange behaviour (eating separately, placing a naked sword between them at night). When Prince Ruby comes back, she asks him about his caste, which he answers and tries to close the matter, but she keeps insisting. Days pass, and the princess falls into a deep state of sadness. The prince tries to comfort her, and she takes the opportunity to ask him again about his caste, otherwise she will kill herself. Prince Ruby then takes her to the bank of a river and asks if she does indeed want to know of his caste. She insists to know the answer; he enters the water until he is seen no more, and a snake emerges from where he stood: the snake is the prince, named Raja Hari Tarang, who has quarreled with his grandfather in their snake realm, and has come to the human world as a ruby; the hag was his grandfather's servant, and now he must go back to his kingdom. After saying this, the snake dips into the waters and disappears. The princess is distraught at the loss of her husband, and returns to the palace to mourn him.

The viziers notice that matters of the state are being neglected, and issue an edict for people to come tell her untold stories in exchange for a gold coin. One time, an old man comes and tells the princess a story, which intrigues the princess so much he returns the following nights: the man himself had tried his luck in the North, and entered a dark forest; with nowhere to go, he climbed up a tree and slept there, when he saw some snakes appear and turn to men, prepare a fire and sweep the ground for the arrival of their master, a large cobra with a smaller golden snake on its head; the large cobras turn into an old king and a young prince; they watch some dancer girls perform, then leave at dawn; the young prince, in human form, utters some words to a princess about the consequences of her question. The princess realizes the golden snake is her husband, Raja Hari Tarang, rewards the old man with rubies and golden coins, and asks to be taken to that exact spot. The old man takes the princess to the location, they climb up a tree and see the events repeat: the snakes come and turn into men to prepare the arrival of their master; the girls perform until dawn, and the young prince, the last to leave, utters the same words to his lost love about the results of her curiosity. Before he turns into a snake again, the princess, his human wife, climbs down the tree and grabs a corner of his robe. The prince warns her of his grandfather, and advises her the only way to rescue him: she is to come to the ceremony the next evening, and serve milk to the snakes; his grandfather will thank her for the hospitality and ask her about a reward; she is to answer twice she is satisfied with what God gave her, and on the third time the snake king, infuriated, will ask her what she wants; she is then to take the opportunity to make him promise not to harm her, and say she wants the prince back. The next evening, the princess follows her husband's instructions to the letter and stands face to face with the snake king; after the third time, the princess asks for the young prince, the king's grandson, as her reward. The snake king agrees to her terms, kisses his grandson goodbye, and leaves with his snake court. The princess and prince return to their kingdom.

=== The Button Prince ===
In a Kohistani tale collected from a Shina teller in Rawalpindi and translated as The Button Prince or The poor man's tale, a poor man goes to the forest to chop wood and a snake appears to him, begging to be hidden. The man hides the snake in a shawl, then returns home. The man's wife finds a shining button in the man's shawl, which he sells to the king for a hefty sum. The king gives the button to his daughter, who lives in a distant bungalow. The button turns into a young child at the princess's house, and the princess decides to raise him. The king learns of the mysterious child and banishes his daughter for having a child born out of wedlock, and she leaves with the child to her fiancé's house. The princess's fiancé, on seeing the duo, refuses to take them in, and the princess builds a home for herself and the Button Prince, whom she raises. When the Button Prince comes of age, the princess marries him, but complains that her new husband has nothing on his name. Since her kingdom knows she married a prince she raised herself, the princess decides to go with her husband to another kingdom to search for fortune. However, the Button Prince is turned into a ram by a witch, and loses sight of the princess. As for the princess, she dons a male disguise and is set to marry the local king's daughter and the minister's daughter. The vizier tries to unmask her, but she earns the trust of the other girls to hide her secret. In time, the princess arranges a tournament between every ram of the city, which draws the witch and the transformed prince. The witch is brought before the princess, who threatens her to reverse the Button Prince's transformation. The Button Prince is restored to human form, kills the witch, and takes part in a wrestling competition against the local males. The Button Prince marries the princess, the king's daughter and the vizier's daughter, and they live together. (Note: This sequence is part of another tale type which was incorporated in Thompson's 1961 revision of the international Aarne-Thompson Index. In this type, AaTh 977, "The Eloping Couple and the Robbers", a prince and princess elope and eventually take shelter with a band of robbers, which chase after them and kill the prince; the princess mourns for her lover, when gods heed her cries and restore him; later, the prince is turned into an animal by a witch. However, German folklorist Hans-Jörg Uther, in his 2004 revision of the international index, discontinued the typing.) One day, the minister's daughter makes a remark about the Button Prince, who turns back into a snake, then slithers off. After losing her husband, the princess who raised him goes to a crossroads and pays ashrafis for people to share stories, in hopes of locating the Button Prince. At one time, an old man and his son wish to meet the princess at the crossroads, but finds a gathering of snakes dancing in a meadow, then go to report to the princess. The princess notices the duo's story gives her the whereabouts of the Button Prince, and she goes there. In the meadow, a little snake, who is the Button Prince, recognizes the princess, turns her into a needle, and takes her back to the place of snakes, Snake Town (judroó xáaraŗ), a lacustrine and rainy underworld. The Button Prince's serpent mother notices the human smell and discovers her daughter-in-law, but decides to protect her by disguising her as a needle for weeks on end, whenever her other snake sons sense a human smell nearby. The Button Prince's snake brethren like to take him along, while the princess talks to her snake mother-in-law, until one day the snake mother asks for her sons to leave the Button Prince at home with her. On this occasion, the snake mother advises the Button Prince and his human wife how they can escape from their kingdom, and gives them objects to stop any further pursuit (in a "Magic Flight" sequence): soap to create precipices, combs to create forests, needles that turn into thorny bushes, ashes to toss into his brothers' eyes, dung cake for piles of dung, beads to distract the snakes and finally bread. The pair escapes while the snake mother holds his brothers off, but they trail behind the couple, so the Button Prince throws behind the objects to stop the chase. Safe at home, the Button Prince divorces the other wives and remains with the first princess, as they leave for more adventures.

== See also ==
- The Ruby Prince (Punjabi folktale)
- Shashisena Kavya (Odia folktale)
- The story of Halahala Kumar (Odia folktale)
- Princess Himal and Nagaray
- The Snake Prince
- The Story of Hira and Lal
- Tulisa, the Wood-Cutter's Daughter
- Saint Passaway
