= The Story of Hira and Lal =

Indian folk tale

The Story of Hira and Lal is an Indian folktale published in The Modern Review, in 1907. The tale is a local form of the international cycle of the Animal as Bridegroom or The Search for the Lost Husband, in that a woman marries a man of supernatural origin (a snake or serpent), loses him and must regain him. The tale also contains tale type AaTh 977, "The Eloping Couple and the Robbers", wherein a protagonist couple flee from their families, find shelter with robbers that kill the male half of the couple, but deities' mercy restores the man to life - a type that the indexes only report in India and South Asia.

== Sources ==
The tale was first published in the journal The Modern Review, in 1907, by one Shaikh Chilli, and sourced from Hindustan. Stith Thompson and Jonas Balys sourced it from the Ganges Valley.

== Publication ==
Author Ruskin Bond republished the tale as The Friendship of Heera and Lal. Journalist Murkot Kunhappa reprinted the tale as Hira and Lal.

== Summary ==
A poor grass-cutter ventures in the jungle to cut grass to sell. One day, he goes to fetch grass and finds the carcass of a dead snake which he intends to use to tie the bundle, but, suddenly, the carcass transforms into a shining ruby, or Lal, which he hides in his pagri or turban. The man decides to present the Raja with the ruby. The Raja gives the ruby to his wife, the Rani, for safekeeping, but the ruby turns into a baby. The royal couple decide to raise the baby and name him Lal ('ruby'). He goes to school and meets a princess named Hira ('diamond'), whom he falls in love with. After some time, Hira is set to be married to another Raja, and Lal's father wants him to cease all contact with her. Lal disobeys his orders and rides to Hira's wedding, and they elope on two horses to regions unknown.

Some time later, Hira and Lal take shelter with an old woman, who is the wife and mother of a pair of robbers. The old woman's maidservant, in tears, tells the couple about the robbers and bids them escape. The couple mount on their horses, as the robber lady tries to stop them, to no avail. As soon as they flee the house, the woman shouts that "two fat birds are escaping", alerting the approaching father-son robbers of their escaping victims. The robbers chase after the prince and the princess, but Lal shoots an arrow behind him and kills the younger robber. Lal and Hira then reach a serai where they spend the night. The next morning, an old man seeks employment with the pair. They hire him. Unbeknownst to them, the old man is the older robber. He beheads Lal and threatens to kill Hira, but she distracts him by making him look at a kite and kills him. Hira cries over the corpse of her beloved Lal, earning the pity of passersby. Fortunately for her, deities Shiva and Parvati are walking nearby when they hear the lamentations. Parvati wishes to investigate, but Shiva tells her that they are just a mortal person's weeping. Still, the goddess convinces Shiva to heed Hira's cries, and the god reconnects Lal's head to is body, then uses his divine blood (which the story says is amrita) to revive him. Lal is restored to life and Hira worships Shiva and Parvati in gratitude.

Next, the human couple depart to a large and populous city, and lodge themselves in a nearby inn. Lal goes to the city to buy some provisions, and enters the shop of a betel-seller, a sorceress, who falls in love with him. Offering some betels, the sorceress tricks Lal with some leaves and turns him into a goat. Noticing her lover's delay, Hira, still in male clothes, makes the same course as Lal did and passes by the same shops. The shopkeepers mistake her for Lal, and Hira, seizing the opportunity, replies she will take the provisions on her return. She finally reaches the same betel-seller, who tries to trick Hira, but the princess avoids anything she offers.

Hira enters another street and meets an old woman preparing sweetmeats, which she explains is for her son who was chosen as sacrifice to the local princess. Hira offers to replace the woman's son as sacrifice, and goes to meet the princess. Still in the male disguise, she marries the princess, and, on the wedding night, the princess begins to foam at the mouth, and a black snake comes out of her thigh. Hira kills the serpent, releasing the princess from her curse. In return, the city's king offers Hira a reward, and Hira asks to be given authority over the city for a single hour and orders every citizen to bring their cattle, birds and beasts to the palace at once. It happens thus, and every citizen joins the gathering, save for the betel-seller. Hira correctly deduces the betel-seller is missing, and some soldiers bring the sorceress and her goat with her. The goat rushes to Hira's side, and the sorceress spins a story the animal was to be a sacrifice to goddess Kali. Hira, still in her authority, orders the sorceress to be burnt, and restores Lal to human form by reciting some mantras.

Lal marries both Hira and the city's princess. Marital life is a blissful one, until one day, the princess suggests Hira to ask Lal about his origins. At first, Hira declines wanting to know, but changes her mind and begins to ask Lal about it. The prince warns her about asking such a question, for she will regret it. Despite the warning, Hira insists to know about his past and caste, and he goes to a stream. The more Hira questions him, the deeper Lal enters the stream. After he is completely submerged, Lal becomes a giant black snake and slithers under the waves, leaving a bereft Hira crying at the river margin. The tale ends.

== Analysis ==
=== Tale type ===
In Stith Thompson and Warren Roberts's Types of Indic Oral Tales, the tale is classified under its own Indic type, 425D Ind, "Search for Serpent Husband": the heroine marries a man of mysterious origin; jealous women probe her into asking his name or origins; he reveals it and turns into a snake; after many hardships, she reunites with him. (Note: The word "Indic" refers to tale types that, although not registered in the Aarne-Thompson-Uther international index, exist in the oral and written literature of these three South Asian countries.)

The middle part of the story, where the pair meets the thieves, Lal is killed, but the deities revive him, is classified as another tale type found in India, which was incorporated in Thompson's 1961 revision of the international Aarne-Thompson Index. In this type, AaTh 977, "The Eloping Couple and the Robbers", a prince and princess elope and eventually take shelter with a band of robbers, which chase after them and kill the prince; the princess mourns for her lover, when gods heed her cries and restore him; later, the prince is turned into an animal by a witch. However, German folklorist Hans-Jörg Uther, in his 2004 revision of the international index, discontinued the typing.

=== Motifs ===
The protagonist's name, Lal, means "ruby".

According to Stith Thompson and Jonas Balys study of motifs of Indian literature and oral folklore, the tale contains the motifs B604.1 "Marriage to snake" and D391 "Transformation: serpent (snake) to person".

==== The husband's transformation ====
According to Stith Thompson and Jonas Balys study of motifs of Indian literature and oral folklore, the tale contains the motif D432.3.1 "Transformation: ruby to person".

==== The husband's vanishing ====
In his work about Cupid and Psyche and other Animal as Bridegroom tales, Swedish scholar Jan-Öjvind Swahn identified that, in certain tales, the heroine causes her supernatural husband's disappearance by inquiring his name. Swahn named this motif The Name Taboo and surmised that it occurred "primarily in India". In Thompson and Roberts's Types of Indic Oral Tales, this motif appears in Indic type 425D Ind, "Search for Serpent Husband": the heroine insists to know her husband's caste or name, and he, in return, gives her an answer, but vanishes in the water like a snake. This episode corresponds with motifs C32.2., "Tabu: questioning supernatural husband"; C32.2.1, "Tabu: asking name of supernatural husband"; C32.2.2, "Tabu: asking where supernatural husband comes from", and C32.2.3, "Tabu: asking for caste of supernatural husband."

== Variants ==
=== Manikkam and Moothiam ===
Author M. N. Venkataswami collected an Indian tale from informant Sandhā (Puli) Abboy, from "Nagpur country". In this tale, titled Manikkam and Moothiam, a poor woodcutter laments his poor station in life: no parents, no child and a wife to care for. One day, he goes to the forest to gather wood and finds a dried tree. He uproots it and finds a diamond. The story then explains that Nagendra, the king of serpents, exiled his son to Naraloka for 20 years and cast a diamond off his head, his own son - the same diamond found by the woodcutter. The woodcutter brings the diamond home with him and sees that his luck changes for the better: he sells more firewood for better prices. After some time, the woodcutter, now rich, goes to check on the diamond and finds a baby. He and his wife decide to raise the baby as their own son. Ten years later, princess Moothiam ("pearl") goes to the patashala to learn the Kalas ("arts"), and so does the woodcutter's son, named Manikkam. After some years, the king thinks to himself that the princess has learned enough and decides to take her out of school so she can spend her days inside. Moothiam convinces Manikkam to elope. They make arrangements (some dresses and jewels), meet at the temple of Mahakal and depart on their horses.

Some time later, they rest by the house of an old woman, mother of seven robbers. A Komti passes by the robbers' house and alerts the pair about the robbers. The pair then makes their escape, but are pursued by the robbers. Moothiam shoots arrows at the robbers and kills all of them save one, whom they decide to spare and take as a groom. This leads to a fatal mistake: as soon as Manikkam says he wants to rest, he gives his scimitar to the last robber, who kills the youth. The robber, in return, is killed by the princess, who mourns for her fallen friend. Deities Parwati and Parmeshwara heed her cries and descend to Earth as an old couple. Shiva senses that the youth is the son of the king of serpents and gives the princess a vibhudikaya to apply on his body to revive him. The princess does that and Manikkam comes back to life. The princess and the youth reach another city where they live together.

In this city, the king convinces Manikkam to marry Moothiam, so they set up a date for their wedding. However, a flower-woman, a witch, falls in love with Manikkam and turns him into a goat with an enchanted garland. Moothiam finds the sorceress, punishes her and marries Manikkam. The youth also marries the second king's daughter. Since his time in Naraloka is running out, and to expedite the process, Manikkam's mother goes to the human realm under human guise and sells some Gangaraingu pandlu fruit to them. Manikkam notices the fruit is from the serpent realm. The next day, the fruit seller tries to convince the women to eat some of his plate, knowing that her son's nails contain poison - a stratagem that also fails. The third time, the fruit seller induces both women to ask about their husband's origins. Manikkam tells her to go to the sea shore. Moothiam and people assemble near the sea-shore; Mannikam reveals he is the son of Nagaraja, turns into a large snake and dives into the sea, back to Nagaloka.

Moothiam swims after him, despite the force of the waves, and Manikkam, in snake form, catches his human wife and takes her to his father's garden. Manikkam gives her garments to wear and milk from the cosmic cow to eat, and recommends her to clean the way to a hillock of pebbles and thorns and prepare food and milk for his father when he comes. The father, noticing the kind action, shall grant her a boon. The first time, Moothiam trembles with fear before the king of snakes and forgets to ask for the boon. Some time later, Manikkam's snake wife learns that his human wife is in the serpent realm, and gives her a dirty rag smeared with oil to be washed clean as a conch-shell. Manikkam summons some cranes flying overhead and orders them to clean the piece of cloth. The snake-wife also gives her a pot full of holes and orders her to empty a well. Manikkam orders the little frogs to fill up the holes. The next time his father comes to the hillock, on the full moon, Moothiam still shakes with fear. The third time, she takes heart and asks Nagaraja for the diamond on his head. Nagendra gives her the diamond. Manikkam then takes Moothiam back to the human realm.

=== Prince Ruby and Princess Diamond ===
Professor Sadhana Naithani published a tale originally collected by William Crooke from a student in Jwalapur. In this tale, titled by Crooke as Prince Ruby and Princess Diamond, a Jat and a Gujar are friends. One day, the Jat buys an earthen pot and places a snake inside it. He gives the pot to his wife and she puts it on the oven. She opens it and finds a garland of rubies. (Note: This element is classified, according to Stith Thompson and Jonas Balys study of motifs of Indian literature and oral folklore, as motif D425.1.3. "Transformation: snake to garland".) The Jat decides to sell the garland to the Rajá. The Rajá takes it and places it in a cot, and, the next morning, a baby appears in the place of the garland. The Rajá and his wife, the Rani, deduce that the rubies have turned into a boy. Twelve years later, they decide to marry the boy, named Prince Lal, to a girl "born of a diamond", but evil viziers kill the Rajá to usurp his kingdom. The Rani escapes with the boy to another kingdom. Prince Lal becomes friends with a girl named Hira Princess at school. The boy and the princess elope and ride two horses to regions unknown, and stop to rest at the house of a family of "free booters". Prince Lal kills the 14 booters. Their father, in revenge, wears a disguise and offers to be the duo's syce. The false syce cuts off the prince's head and Hira Princess, in retaliation, kills him. She cries for her fallen friend. Her pleas are heard by Párbati and Mahadeva. Mahadeva tells the princess to use her blood to revive him. Prince Lal comes back to life, goes to his father's kingdom and fights the usurpers to regain the kingdom.

=== Lal and Heera (Magahi) ===
In an Indian tale in the Magahi language collected by Ramprasad Singh with the title "लाल आउ हीरा" ("Lal and Heera"), a merchant loses his fortune when disaster strikes his country and he has to forage for wood in the forest to sell and earn his living. One day, he brings some roasted grains to eat in the forest, and finds a snake next to a bundle. He takes a stick to shoo away the snake, and discovers a red stone next to it. He takes the stone and the wood to sell, and the buyer offers a huge amount of money for the stone. The stone, a ruby, changes hands until a king buys it and gives it to the queen for safekeeping. Later, the monarch sends an emissary to request the queen brings the gem, but the queen discovers a baby boy inside the chest instead of the ruby. They decide to raise the boy and name him Lal, placing him at the same classes as princess Heera, their daughter.

As time passes, Lal and Heera fall in love, but their teacher reports them to the king, who decides to place them in separate schools. Thus, the couple decide to elope, take some horses and flee the kingdom. They reach a well next to a house, which they learn belongs to a band of seven thieves. They spend some time in the house before the thieves arrive, and reach an inn, where they spend the night. The thieves, plus their sister, reach the inn and lie to the innkeeper that they are looking for their fleeing brother-in-law (Lal). The thieves, posing as Lal's relatives, take him with them, but Lal and Heera flee on two quick horses, the thieves after the pair. Lal and Heera kill the bandits, but spare one of them to be their servant. Heera loses an anklet on the road and asks Lal and the thief-servant to fetch it for her. When Lal reaches down to grab it, the thief beheads the youth. Heera cries for Lal's death in a temple, and the tree leaves join in her mourning. Suddenly, deities Parvati and Mahade pass by Heera and learn of her ordeal. Parvati asks Mahade to revive the youth, and he bids Heera to bring some water from the lake. Heera fetches water, which Mahade sprinkles over Lal's body, prickles his own finger and brings it to the youth's mouth, restoring him to life.

Lal and Heera then ride to another kingdom, where they set up a tent and Lal goes to buy some provisions. However, when he enters the store, the shopkeeper falls in love with him, douses a betel leaf with some magic and gives it to Lal, turning him into a sheep which she ties to a pole. Noticing Lal's delay, Heera dons a male disguise and enters the city. The local princess falls in love with Heera's male disguise and marries "him", but on the wedding night, Heera avoids sleeping with her. Heera, in male disguise, says it is a tradition from their land being gifted a sword. Later, Heera, as the local king's son-in-law, asks him to order a curfew before a certain hour of the night, and to allow people to graze their sheep at night. By doing this, Heera locates the shopkeeper and threatens her to restore Lal to human form. After she does so, Heera kills the shopkeeper and brings Lal with her back to the princess.

Heera, Lal and the princess live together. One day, however, the princess finds Lal sprawled in his bed and tries to wake him up. Lal jumps out of bed and tries to avoid both of his wives. Heera and the princess notice that they do not know Lal's caste, and decide to ask him. He eventually jumps into a pond, turns into a snake, and slithers away in the water. Both girls mourn for Lal's disappearance, and the king announces with a tabla (drum) he will give half of his kingdom to whoever has news of Lal. An old man takes up the challenge and goes to the same pond where Lal vanished, hiding in a tree hollow: soon, he watches as a fairy and Indra Maharaj come out of the pond, Lal with them as their tabla player, as they dance to music, and return to the lake. The old man goes to report to the princesses about the discovery and takes them to the pond. That same night, Heera and the princess witness the event, as Indra Maharaj and some fairies dance with Lal and enter the pond; the girls try to grab their co-husband before he vanishes with the dawn. Lal says that their try is futile, but concocts a plan: they shall wait for the next night, give him too much ganja ("गाँजा", in the original) so he performs badly at the tabla, forcing Indra to ask for another music player, which is to be provided by one of the princesses; after they perform, the girls are to ask Indra to return Lal to them. It happens thus: Lal is intoxicated by the ganja, the princesses perform for Indra and ask him to return Lal to them. Indra allows the girls to have him. The trio return home to the palace.

=== The Snake's Son ===
In an Indian tale in the Magahi language collected by Ramprasad Singh with the title "नाग के बेटा" ("The Snake's Son"), a king worries for he is wealthy, but has no son. He also has a fort a snake slithers in through a wall. The snake learns the wall will eventually crumble on it, and it happens thus. The commotion draws the attention of the king's servants, who find the crushed snake and a baby on the snake's mouth. The servants bring the baby to the king, who raises him and, with the auspices of a Brahmin, names him Lal Shahzada ("लाल सहजादा"), but he is warned that, if the prince reveals his name, he will turn into a snake and vanish, since the baby was born of the snake's mouth. As the boy grows up and reaches marriageable age, the king sends emissaries to find a suitable bride. A priest learns that, on the other side of the river, lives a princess named Lal Shahzadi ("Ruby Princess"), and they set a date for their marriage, but Lal Shahzada's father's death delays their plans. Years pass, and Lal Shahzada is mocked for not having a bride. After confronting his mother, he learns of his arranged marriage to Lal Shahzadi and rides to her kingdom. He stops by her kingdom's gates and her father wants to kill him, but faints at the prince's beauty, then regains his consciousness and decides to marry his daughter to the prince.

Lal Shahzada and Lal Shahzadi marry and spend some time in relative peace and happiness. After a while, the couple make a turn home to his kingdom. Lal Shahzada places his wife on a palanquin, while he goes to find some fodder for their horses. He meets an old thieving woman who has some fodder. The old woman, however, sights the prince and wishes to marry him to her daughter, so she turns him into a sheep to keep him with her. Lal Shahzadi notices her husband's delay, dons a male disguise and goes to look for Lal Shahzada, eventually meeting the thieving woman. The princess deduces there is something with the old woman, but makes her way to the prince's kingdom as the prince himself. She introduces herself as Lal Shahzada and requests that every subject comes to meet their sovereign. At the gathering, the princess notices the thieving woman is not there. She comes to the gathering with the sheep, and the princess asks to have the sheep, but the thieving woman refuses, saying the sheep is human. So the princess orders the woman to restore the sheep back into Lal Shahzada. It happens thus, and the thieving woman is punished for her magics.

After the old woman dies, her daughter, wishing to have Lal Shahzada to herself, goes to talk to the princess and questions that she does not know her husband's name. Lal Shahzadi mulls over the question and asks Lal Shahzada about his name. He explains that if he tells her his name, he will turn into a snake and vanish. Still, the princess does not believe his words and both go to near a pond. Lal Shahzada enters the waters, shouts that he is the son of a snake named Lal Shahzada, turns into a snake and slithers away. The princess mourns for her husband's loss. Some time later a holy man appears and advises her how she can rescue him: fill bowls of warm milk and place them on the four corners of the pond; three snakes will come to drink the milk, and the fourth will stand by, which will be her husband; she is to hold he fourth snake and never let it go until it resumes human form. The princess does as instructed and sights her husband's snake form, which she holds tight until he is restored to human form. They reunite and live happily.

=== Heer Princess and Lal Kunwar ===
In an Indian tale from Haryana titled "हीर शहजादी और लाल कुंवर" ("Heer Princess and Lal Kunwar"), a queen prays to the Serpent God for a son, and is given one she names Lal Kunwar. One day, she is bathing her son, whose body is shining with a red aura. The king, his father, takes a look at him and dies, leaving the boy fatherless and having to be tutored by the Prime Minister. When he is thirteen years old, the prince beats the Prime Minister's son, and the Prime Minister's wife wants the prince dead. Thus, the widowed queen and the prince are taken to the forest to be killed by some soldiers, who decide to spare them provided they flee to another kingdom. The queen agrees and escapes to the land of Shahjahan Nagar to raise her son. In time, the local Princess Heer has been promised to Lal Kunwar (Prince Lal) or Lal Shahzada ("लाल शहजादा", in the original; "Ruby Prince"), whom she calls Veerlal, since before their births, and suspects he is of the serpent clan, but knows she cannot ask him about his lineage. Lal Kunwar keeps silent about his origins, but introduces himself as a prince. Heer then tries to convince her father to allow their marriage, but the monarch refuses. Thus, Lal and Heer mount their horses and flee to the forest. Lal goes to forage for roots and herbs while Heer takes a bath in a pond, when a Bhil youth finds them and fatally shoots the prince with an arrow. The Bhil kidnaps the princess on his horse, but Heer drops a shoe for him to catch. While he is distracted, she kills him with an arrow. Heer returns to tend to Lal's body, prepares a pyre for him, and mourns. A passing divine couple, Shiva and Parvati, listen to the mortal's cries and Parvati bids Shiva to help them, and Shiva revives Lal, to Heer's happiness. Lal advises Heer to don a male disguise and they ride to the city of king Ksatrabha for rations. Heer also requests some betel leaf for paan. Lal buys provisions and goes to buy some betel leaves from a female seller, who falls in love with him and tricks the prince, turning him into a calf by tying a thread around his neck. The betel seller keeps Lal as her lover.

Meanwhile, Heer notices Lal's delay and goes to investigate, discovering he disappeared after talking to the betel seller. Late at night, Heer hears a scream and finds a man kidnapping a woman. Heer kills the man and releases the woman, who reveals she is the local princess, daughter of king Ksatrabha. Heer, still in male disguise, introduces herself as "Lal Kunwar" and marries the princess with the king's gratitude. Heer, in male garments, wanders the streets in the morning in search of Lal, and devises a plan: she invents a ritual occasion which everyone is to attend and bring their animals to be fed. The betel seller comes with the calf, which has a black thread around its neck. Heer suspects there is something with the animal and unties the black thread, restoring Lal to normal. The betel seller is punished by being stomped by an elephant, Heer explains everything to king Ksatrabha, and Lal Kunwar marries both princesses and brings his mother to live with them. The tale then explains Lal Kunwar is the prince of Naglok ("नागलोक का कुमार", in the original), the world of snakes, and cannot reveal his origins, as his mother prayed to the serpent deity ("सर्प देवता", in the original), lest he turns back into a snake. One day, however, Ksatrabha's daughter asks Lal Kunwar about his lineage, and the prince warns her not to press further, but she insists to know. On revealing his origins, he becomes a snake and slithers away. Heer and the other princess mourn for him.

Heer then organizes a festival to praise the gods in hopes of finding Lal Kunwar again and sends invitations to all. During the festival, a Brahmin appears late and goes to eat. Heer then asks the reason for his tardiness, and he recalls a story: he climbed a peepal tree distant from his village and saw a snake court nearby, a large snake on a throne sided by a younger one, as the snakes danced for them; the younger one stayed behind, hit its head on the tree three times and cried out for Heer. Heer Princess asks to be taken to the peepal tree. Heer and the Brahmin witness as a cadre of snakes prepare everything for their dance and dance to king Nagraj, and sight a coiled snake. After the dance finishes, the coiled snake goes to hit its head on the tree and cry for Heer, when the princess herself appears to him. Heer and Lal admit they suffer for their parting, and Heer asks what she can do to rescue him. Lal Kunwar advises her to clear her mind for ten days, offer milk for the snake court, worship the Snake King and ask for human Lal Kunwar. With this, Lal Kunwar slithers back to the snake hole, as Heer prepares herself: she places milk bowls, burns incenses and worships Nagraj. The Snake King is satisfied with Heer's devotion and offers her whatever boon she may request. Heer Princess then asks for Lal Kunwar back. Nagraj delivers him to the princess and they reunite, then return to Kshatrabha's palace. Lal Kunwar's other wife apologizes for her mistake. King Kshatrabha makes Lal Kunwar his successor, and he retakes his father's kingdom by defeating the prime minister.

=== The Ignorant Wife ===
In an Indian tale collected from Kumaon with the title The Ignorant Wife, a woman named Heera has married a man named Lal, unaware of his true serpentine nature. One day, while she is taking a bath, a strand of her long hair is washed away by the river and swallowed by a fish. A fisherman catches the fish, finds the hair and presents to the king. The king falls in love with its owner and orders the fisherman to find her, on penalty of death. The fisherman consults with a female magician who promises to find the girl. She drives a magical chariot, lands near the river and pays Heera a visit in her palace, pretending to be a relative of her grandmother, a sister. Heera is moved by the false grand-aunt's tears and takes her in, hiding her in the storeroom from her husband Lal. After Lal returns home, the magician spies on Lal and Heera eating from their own plates and formulates a plan: she comments with Heera that she has never eaten from her husband's plate. Driven by the false relative's words, Heera takes a handful of food from Lal's plate, angering him. Lal leaves the palace and Heera follows him to the river bank. Lal enters the river and slowly becomes a serpent, while Heera keeps asking him why he does not share his food with her. He tries to talk to her, but she refuses to understand, so he turns into a serpent and vanishes into the river. Heera mourns for her husband's disappearance. The magician falsely comforts Heera and bids her take a bath with her in the middle of the river, but takes the girl to her magical chariot, utters an incantation and departs with Heera to the king's palace. The magician introduces Heera to the king, who wishes to marry her, but Heera declines, saying she will do penance by the crossroads in order to wait for her husband, and if Lal does not return, she agrees to marry him. The king agrees to her terms and gives her a place to do penance. Years pass, and Lal does not appear to Heera. Meanwhile, in the month of Poos, where a celebration of snakes is held at night, attracting hermits and snake charmers. One day, a beggar men and his son take shelter and pray for a nearby peepal tree to open and take them, while the pair watches the event of the snake celebration, which Lal attends in snake form, crying out for Heera; Lal joins the other shapeshifting snakes in their dance. The beggar and his son climb out the peepal tree and reach Heera's location, telling her about the snake dance and the one crying out for Heera. The woman gives the pair shelter and asks to be taken there. The following Sunday, she climbs out the same peepal tree and waits for the snake retinue: the snakes appear before the Serpent King, they dance, while Lal, in snake form, keeps himself apart and weeps. As dawn comes, the snakes disappear, and Lal goes to join them, when Heera climbs down the tree and grabs her husband's serpentine form. The man orders to be released and calls her nonbeliever, admonishing her for her questioning. Heera feels sorry for their separation and asks what can be done so that they can be reunited. Lal then advises Heera that if she can earn the blessing of Lal's father, the Serpent King, he can be released from this curse and become human forever. Thus, Heera, the following Sunday, prepares dishes for the Serpent King. The Serpent King appears with his kin, and notices the offering made for him, bidding whoever made them to come forth and ask for a boon. Heera comes out of hiding and asks for a son, then explains she is married to the Serpent King's son, Lal, and wishes to have him back, retelling her whole story. Touched by her tale of sacrifice, the Serpent King lifts the curse on Lal, and he returns to human form. Lal reunites with Heera, and they exchange their leftovers with each other.

=== The Princess and the Snake Prince (Gujarat) ===
In a Gujarati tale translated to English as The Princess and the Snake Prince by author Suresh Gadhavi, a king has a beautiful princess for daughter he wishes to see find a suitable husband. One day, the princess ventures into the forest with her friends and finds a handsome youth taking a bath in a lake. The tale explains the youth is Naga Kumar, the Snake Prince come from naga lok to the world of humans in human form, as the nagas from there do sometimes. The princess and the prince fall in love, and she asks him about his origins; he simply says he is a king and comes from another kingdom. The princess wishes to marry him, and he asks her a favour: never to ask anything about his previous life. The princess takes him to the king, who rejoices that the youth's personality and agrees to his marriage to the princess. The princess marries Naga Kumar and they remain together at all times. Meanwhile, in naga lok, the Naga King, the queen and Naga Kumar's naga wife worry about his long absence and search everywhere in the kingdom, to no avail. The Naga wife decides to look for him herself, changes herself into a woman and reaches the world of humans and the princess's kingdom, posing as a street vendor and peddling her combs to female buyers in exchange for information on their husbands' castes. The Naga wife reaches the princess's palace and she is interested in buying combs, but the seller asks for the princess's husband's caste - information she does not have. The Naga wife advises the princess to ask her husband about it and promises to return the following day. The princess asks Naga Kumar about his caste, he is surprised by the question, but does not answer. The following day, the Naga wife keeps pressing the princess to ask further, lying that the princess's husband must be a man of low caste, not a prince. This creates doubts in the princess's mind, driving her to further question her husband and still getting no answer. Naga Kumar worries about his human wife's questioning and asks her not to press further, lest they become separate for good. Still, the princess threatens to kill herself if she does not obtain this information, and Naga Kumar relents. He takes the princess the following morning to the bank of the lake where they met and asks the princess a final question: if she wants to know his caste or for them to be together. The princess answers she wishes for an answer, despite his warnings, and Naga Kumar slowly enters the lake little by little until there is only his head visible, and asks for one final time. The princess admits she wants to know, and Naga Kumar dives in the water, turns into a black snake, gives his human wife a final look, then swims back to naga lok. The human princess keeps crying for her husband to come back, until her pleas cease.

== See also ==
- Champavati
- The Golden Crab
- Princess Himal and Nagaray
- Sasisena Kavya
- The Snake Prince
- Prince Lal Maluk
- The Tale of the Woodcutter and his Daughters
- Tulisa, the Wood-Cutter's Daughter
- The story of Halahala Kumar
- The Ruby Prince
