= The Ruby Prince =

South Asian folktale from Punjab

The Ruby Prince is a South Asian folktale, first published in the late 19th century by author Flora Annie Steel. The tale is a local form of the cycle of the Animal as Bridegroom or The Search for the Lost Husband, in that a woman marries a man of supernatural origin, loses him and must regain him.

== Sources ==
The tale was originally printed in the late 19th century and identified as a Punjabi tale. Later publications sourced it as from Pakistan.

According to Richard Carnac Temple, the tale was collected by author Flora Annie Steel from a Jaṭṭ boy of Dobuldan in Rohtak district.

== Translation ==
The tale was also translated to Russian with the title "Сын змеиного царя" ("Son of the King of the Snakes").

== Summary ==
While walking on the road, a Brahman finds a shining red Ruby on the ground. He picks it up and pockets it into his garments. Feeling hungry, the Brahman enters a corn-merchant's shop and offers the ruby as payment for the food. The corn-merchant is stunned at the sight of the ruby, clearly worth more than anything in his store, and suggests the Brahman takes it to the king.

The Brahman sells the ruby to the king for a lakh of rupees and goes on his merry way. The king then gives the ruby to the queen for safekeeping, and she hides it in a locked trunk. Twelve years later, the king decides to open up the casket to see his ruby, but a youth comes out of it. The king questions the youth about his appearance and the fate of the ruby. The youth answers he is the Ruby Prince, and that is the only answer he can give. The king then orders him to be exiled from the kingdom from this perceived affront.

In his wanderings, the Ruby Prince reaches a town, and sees an old woman crying. The woman explains that their realm is menaced by an Ogre, and this time her son is next to be sacrificed to the monster. The Ruby Prince decides to save the old woman's son and vanquish the ogre, and asks the old woman to lodge there for some time. The next day, he rides his horse to the ogre's meeting spot, kills him, and impales the ogre's head on a spike to show the town the monster is dead. He then returns to the old woman's house to sleep some more.

The townspeople see the ogre's head and notify the king, who goes to the old woman's house, since it was her son who was supposed to be the ogre's next victim. The old woman tells the king that their saviour is sleeping in her house. The king enters the house and sees that the sleeping youth is the one he drove forth from the palace. He consults with his ministers, who advise him to give his daughter to the youth as a reward for killing the ogre.

The Ruby Prince and the king's daughter marry in a grand ceremony. Some time later, the princess keeps hearing the gossip of a female courtier about her having married a stranger from who knows where. Intrigued by her husband's origins, she asks the Ruby Prince about his past, his origins, but he refuses to divulge any information.

One day, the princess and the Ruby Prince are near a riverside, and she is still questioning him about his previous life. The Ruby Prince steps in the water as the princess insists on knowing her husband's name. He slowly sinks into the water, until "a jewelled snake with a golden crown and ruby star" appears in the water, looks at the princess with a sorrowful expression, then disappears beneath the water.

The princess despairs at her decision, and offers a bushel of gold to anyone who can bring her information about her husband. Time passes and, without news of her husband, she grows ill, until one day a dancing-woman comes to the court. The dancing-woman tells her about a strange occurrence: while she was gathering sticks, she rested for a bit near a tree, after she woke up, she saw a bright light, then a sweeper came out of a snake-hole, a water-carrier sprinkling water on the ground, and two carpet-bearers; music began to play, as a procession came out of the hole, a youth of majestic appearance at the front, and among his retinue a man with a red star on the forehead who began to dance before the king.

The princess and the dancing-woman go to the tree and wait for the strange procession to come out of the snake-hole. The same servants come, prepare the way for the procession, and the king comes with his retinue. The princess recognizes her husband among the king's retinue by a red star he is wearing. The princess notices the Ruby Prince's wan aspect.

The dancing-girl explains her plan to the princess to save her husband: since the Snake-King is delighted at the dances, the princess should learn to dance, dance before the Snake-King in a way he is to be so impressed that he will grant her anything. The princess is taught by the dancing-girl and surpasses her.

Finally, the princess returns to the tree and waits for the Snake-King's retinue. After they come and the Snake-King forces the Ruby Prince to dance before him, the princess, wearing veiled garments and decorated with jewels, begins to dance before the King. So impressive are her dancing moves that the Snake King grants her a favor. The princess asks to be given the man for whom she danced. The Snake-King fumes at her answer and threatens to kill her, but remembers his promise and lets her take the Ruby Prince away.

== Analysis ==
=== Tale type ===
The tale was classified by scholar Heda Jason as type ATU 425, "The Search for the Lost Husband", according to the international Aarne-Thompson-Uther Index. The tale was also said to "much resemble" the Graeco-Roman myth of Cupid and Psyche. In Stith Thompson and Warren Robert's Types of Indic Oral Tales, the tale is classified under its own Indic type, 425D Ind, "Search for Serpent Husband": the heroine marries a man of mysterious origin; jealous women probe her into asking his name or origins; he reveals it and turns into a snake; after many hardships, she reunites with him. (Note: The word "Indic" refers to tale types that, although not registered in the Aarne-Thompson-Uther international index, exist in the oral and written literature of these three South Asian countries.)

=== Motifs ===
R. C. Temple noted that the protagonist's name, in the original language, is written La’ljí, meaning either "ruby" or "beloved, cherished".

According to Stith Thompson and Jonas Balys study of motifs of Indian literature and oral folklore, the tale contains the motif D432.3.1 "Transformation: ruby to person", B604.1, "Marriage to snake", and D391 "Transformation: serpent (snake) to person".

==== The husband's vanishing ====
In his work about Cupid and Psyche and other Animal as Bridegroom tales, Swedish scholar Jan-Öjvind Swahn identified that, in certain tales, the heroine causes her supernatural husband's disappearance by inquiring his name. Swahn named this motif The Name Taboo and surmised that it occurred "primarily in India". In Thompson and Roberts's Types of Indic Oral Tales, this motif appears in Indic type 425D Ind, "Search for Serpent Husband": the heroine insists to know her husband's caste or name, and he, in return, gives her an answer, but vanishes in the water like a snake. This episode corresponds with motifs C32.2., "Tabu: questioning supernatural husband"; C32.2.1, "Tabu: asking name of supernatural husband"; C32.2.2, "Tabu: asking where supernatural husband comes from", and C32.2.3, "Tabu: asking for caste of supernatural husband."

== Variants ==
=== India ===
==== Son of a Serpent (Magahi) ====
In an Indian tale in the Magahi language collected by Ramprasad Singh from a source in Aurangabad with the title "नाग के बेटा" ("Nag ke beta"; English: "Son of a Serpent"), a Pandit (priest) lives in poverty with his wife and daughter, and makes Puja every day, to his wife's annoyance. The woman sends some children to bother him, so he leaves for four days in order to make a puja without his wife's interference. While away, he goes to take a bath in a nearby pond and leaves his dhoti on the shore. He notices when a little snake slithers into his garments, so he puts it on and returns home. He calls for his wife to reach into his pocket, hoping the snake will bite her, but instead she finds a golden hansuli ("हँसुली", in the original), a type of necklace, to her delight. (Note: This element is classified, according to Stith Thompson and Jonas Balys study of motifs of Indian literature and oral folklore, as motif D425.1.3. "Transformation: snake to garland".) Meanwhile, a king lives next to the pandit's house, and the queen, one day, finds the pandit's wife wearing the golden hansuli around her neck, which she wishes to buy for a sum of money. A deal is made, and the women sells the hansuli, which the queen places in a box. Six months later, the queen wishes to see the hansuli, and a maidservant goes to check on it: instead of the necklace, she finds a baby boy. The maidservant reports to the queen, and she raises the boy as her son. The prince grows up and marries a human lady. However, an old woman appears and advises the princess to question her husband about his origins and lineage, but the prince warns her to avoid such questions, lest he vanishes and she loses him. One day, he agrees to reveal his name, and bids her accompany him to the same pond where the pandit found the snake. While the princess waits on the shore, the prince stands in the water, shouts he is the son of a snake, and dives into the pond. The princess mourns for her husband's disappearance and cries nonstop for days. After five days, deities Mahadev and Parvati are walking nearby when Parvati hears the cries. Mahadev does not wish to approach its source, but Parvati walks towards it and finds the princess. Parvati asks the princess about her problems, and she says her husband drowned in the pond. Unable to do anything, Parvati weeps with her. Mahadev appears soon after and learns from both women about the prince's vanishing, and explains some paris come to dance and play music at night, and there is still hope for her husband. Mahadev and Parvati depart. The princess waits for the night and Mahadev returns. The princess asks where she can find her husband and the deity points to one of the dancers. The princess recognizes her husband and takes him home with her.

=== Bangladesh ===
Bengali writer and folklore researcher Dinesh Chandra Sen reported a "Muhammadam version" of Sakhi-sonā, collected from an informant named Muhammad Korban Ali, "an inhabitant of Butuni in the subdivision of Manikgani, Pergannah Sindurijan in the district of Dacca". In this tale, in Taef, a poor man named Syed lives with his nagging wife. Intent on getting rid of her, he finds a poisonous cobra, places it into an earthen pot and brings it home. Syed gives the pot to his wife. Late at night, the man's wife opens up the pot and finds not a cobra, but gold coins. (Note: This element is classified, according to Stith Thompson's Motif-Index of Folk-Literature, as motif D425.1.2, "Transformation: snake to gold".) Syed's wife is very pleased, and Syed lies that he earned them with his good work. His wife goes to the local Badsha and sells the gold coins to the Begum for a 1,000 rupees. The Begum keeps the coins in a safe and goes to show her husband the next day, but, instead of the coins, they find a baby girl. The Badsha and the Begum announce they have a daughter, and a great celebration is held in their homage. At the same time, the Uzir's household also celebrates the birth of their son, whom they name Mānik.

The Badsha and Begum's daughter, called Sakhi-sonā, is prophesied to elope with a man after she reaches womanhood. She and the Manik read in the same Mokhtab, and grow to love each other as they grow up. They begin to meet in secret, until a maidservant warns them they might be discovered, so they need to escape. Sakhi-sonā disguises herself in masculine attire and, joined by Manik, flees from their city. The pair rides far away through the jungle until they reach a cottage that belongs to an old woman, who is the mother of seven dacoits.

A servant of the old woman warns the pair that the old woman's seven sons will come home ro rob them. Sakhi-sonā and Manik escape, but, unknowingly, leave a trail of seeds for the seven daicots to follow - a trick by the old woman. The seven daicots follow the pair, intent on attacking them. Manik kills six of the daicots, but spares the seventh, a lame one, and takes him in as their horse-keeper.

However, the seventh daicot begins to harbour feelings towards Sakhi-sonā, and plots to kill Manik. He seizes the opportunity when Manik is asleep and Sakhi-sonā is doing some chores in the kitchen. The daicot beheads Manik and Sakhi-sonā avenges him by killing the daicot. Sakhi-sonā cries over her loss, and a pir (saint) revives him.

Sakhi-sonā and a resurrected Manik pass by the cottage of a flower-seller named Champa, who, in turn, falls in love with Manik and turns him into a monkey to have him for herself. Sakhi-sonā notice his absence, but journeys on to another city with their horses. Some of the royal guards arrests Sakhi-sonā, thinking she is the thief that stole two horses some time before.

Sakhi-sonā is thrown in prison, while a giant snake appears to threaten the city. In her dreams, a pir appears and reveals the snake's weakness. Sakhi-sonā tells the king she can defeat the serpent. The king releases her from prison, and she kills the serpent. In gratitude, the king marries Sakhi-sonā to his daughter. The king's daughter, however, suspects something amiss with her "husband". Meanwhile, Manik, in monkey form, writes letters to the palace, addressed to his beloved Sakhi-sonā, telling of his captivity in the flower-seller's power. Sakhi-sonā asks the king to buy her the monkey from the flower-seller. At night, the monkey turns back into Manik and tells her everything. The king punishes the flower seller, and marries his daughter to Manik, after learning that Sakhi-sonā is a woman. Manik lives with his two wives.

=== Pamir Mountains ===
Russian philologist Aleksandr Gryunberg-Tsvetinovich and philologist Mikhail Ivanovich Steblin-Kamensky collected a tale from the Wakhi people with the title "Шохзодалал и Дурбону" ("Shohzodalal and Durbonu"). In this tale, a king has ten wives, but no son yet. One day, a servant of the first wife finds a ruby in the river and brings it to the queen. The queen dismisses as another ruby that can be found in the king's treasury and places it on a shelf. Some time later, the ruby becomes a human baby that the queen passes off as her own son and introduces him to the king. The story explains that the ruby was actually a boy whose mother is a div and father belongs to the pari race. Around the same time, the king's vizier's wife gives birth to a daughter. They decide to name the boy Shohzodalal and the girl Durbonu, and promise to marry their children to each other when they are of age. Shohzodalal and Durbonu are taught together at school. They become friends and fall in love with each other. Due to their closeness, their mother decide that both Shohzodalal and Durbonu are to be skilled in martial affairs. After their studies, the vizier breaks his vow and betroths Durbonu to a foreign prince. Durbonu writes a letter to Shohzodalal, announcing her intentions to elope with him. They ride their horses to another kingdom, and stop by a house where a div family lives. They escape from the divs and kill the seven div sons. The div-mother disguises herself as a human old woman and kills Shohzodalal, and Durbonu, in revenge, decapitates the old woman. Durbonu grieves for her fallen friend for 30 days, until a man in green robes appears to her. The man tells Durbonu to get water from a certain fountain, which revives Shohzodalal. In another kingdom, Durbonu, disguised as a male soldier, rescues princess Nurbonu from a dragon. Nurbonu's father officiates Shohzodalal's marriage to both Durbonu and Nurbonu. Some time later, Shohzodalal's mother hatches a plan to separate her son from his human wives: disguising herself as an old woman, she visits Durbonu and Nurbonu, and convinces Durbonu to ask Shohzodalal about his true parentage. After Shohzodalal arrives home, Durbonu asks him to tell her of his real parents. The man agrees to her request, but warns that it will only bring them misfortune. Shohzodalal takes Durbonu to the garden and goes into the water. Durbonu insists he tells about his past, as the man sinks into the water until he disappears. The co-wives mourn for the loss of the husband, and Durbonu tells Nurbonu to convince her father to build an inn outside the city, where Durbonu will give alms to the poor. Thus, Nurbonu returns to her palace, while Durbonu lives in the inn and helps the poor with food and lodge. One day, an old man and his grandson are looking for their cow, and venture into the woods. They climb a tree and see a retinue come out of the river: an ugly woman comes and begs for a man named Shohzodalal to dance before her. The old man and the grandson tell the story to Durbonu. Durbonu gets a sleeping potion from Nurbonu and goes to the river margin to wait for Shohzodalal. The div retinue comes out of the river. As Shohzodalal dances, Durbonu tosses him her ring to let him know she is there. After deceiving his mother, Shohzodalal climbs up the tree where Durbonu is, and plots with her to get rid of his div mother once and for all: Durbonu has a sleeping potion with her, and Shohzodalal tells her the divs cannot stand the sunlight, so they will pour the potion in every div's mouth, thus allowing his mother to give him up. Just before sunrise, the pair mix the potion in water and give a drink to every div. When the sun rises, the divs cannot move, and Shohzodalal's div mother makes a vow to relinquish Shohzodalal to Durbonu, then crawls back to the water. Shohzodalal, safe at last, embraces Durbonu and returns with her to Nurbonu, then they pay a visit to the prince's adoptive human parents. In their notes, Gryunberg-Tsvetinovich and Steblin-Kamensky explained that the hero's name, "Shohzodalal", was translated as "Prince Lal", "lal" meaning 'ruby'; the heroine's name, "Durbonu", meant 'lady pearl', and the second wife, "Nurbonu", translated to 'Lady Light'.

== See also ==
- Champavati
- The Golden Crab
- Princess Himal and Nagaray
- Sasisena Kavya
- The Snake Prince
- Prince Lal Maluk
- The Story of Hira and Lal
- The Tale of the Woodcutter and his Daughters
- Tulisa, the Wood-Cutter's Daughter
- The story of Halahala Kumar
