= The Snake Prince =

Indian fairy tale

The Snake Prince is an Indian fairy tale, a Punjabi story collected by Major Campbell in Feroshepore. Andrew Lang included it in The Olive Fairy Book (1907). The tale is a local form of the cycle of the Animal as Bridegroom or The Search for the Lost Husband, in that a woman marries a man of supernatural origin, loses him and must regain him.

== Synopsis ==
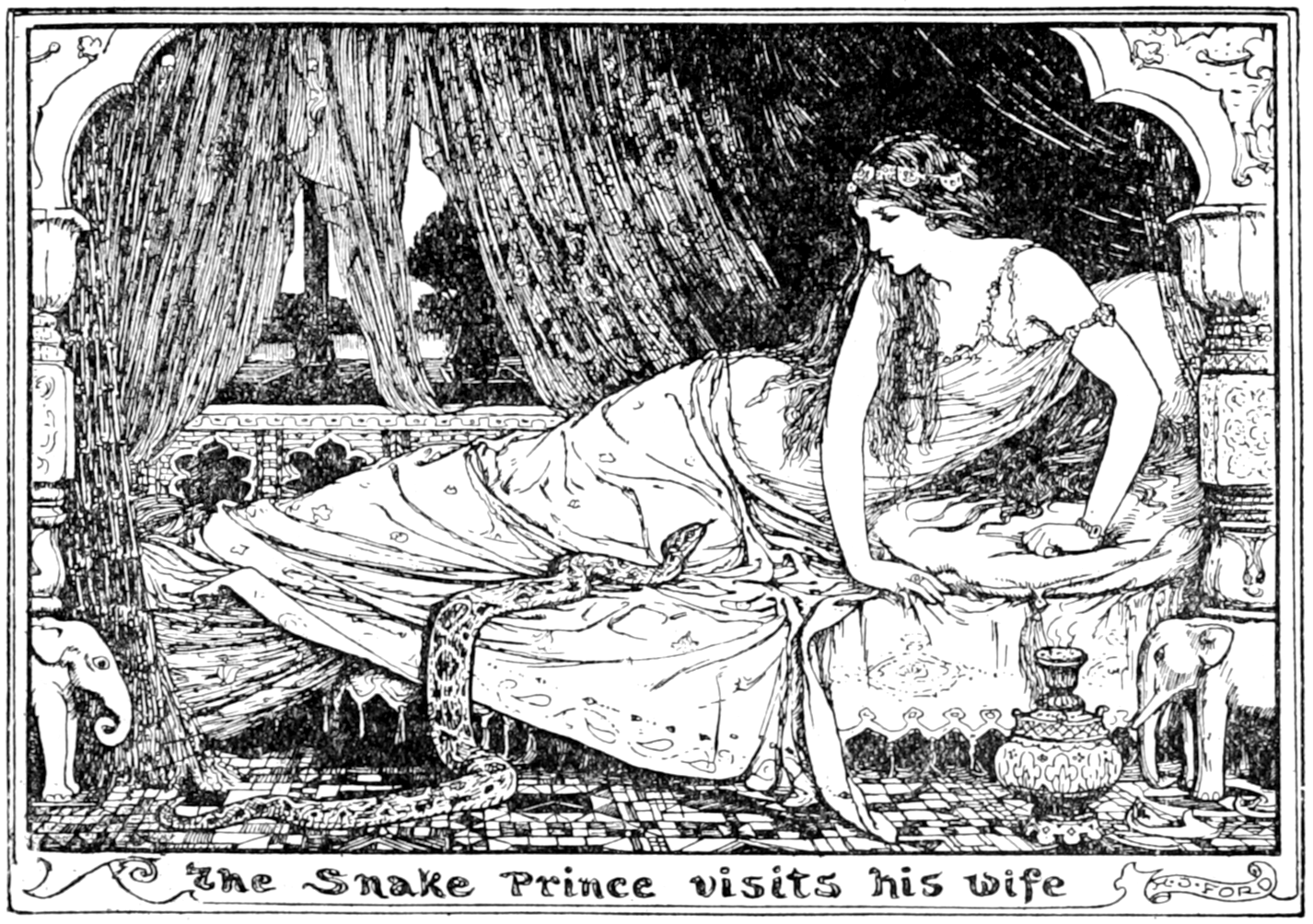
The Snake Prince meets his wife. Illustration by Henry Justice Ford for The Olive Fairy Book.

A poor old woman, with nothing to eat, heads for the river to fish and to bathe. When she comes out of the river, she finds a venomous snake in her pot. She takes it home, so that it bites her and ends her misery. But once she opens the pot, she finds a rich necklace, which she sells to the king, who puts it in a chest. Soon after, when he opens it to show the queen, he instead finds a baby boy, whom the king and his wife raise as their son, and the old woman becomes his nurse. She speaks of how that boy came about.

The king agrees with a neighboring king that their children should marry. But when the other king's daughter goes to marry, her mother warns her to ask about her husband's magic birth. The princess refuses to speak until her husband tells her. He states that he will reveal the truth of his origins, but the princess will regret it. He says that he is a prince from far off, who had been turned into a snake - by saying thus, he becomes a snake again, and slithers off to the river, leaving the princess to mourn for him at the margin. She stays by the river in hopes of finding her husband, and asks for a house of black stone to be built near the river. This is done, and guards and soldiers protect her.

A long time passes, and the princess notices someone has come to her house at night due to a spot of mud left in the direction of the house. This happens twice more, and the princess discovers on the third night that a snake appears to talk to her: it is her husband, who tells her that she can save him if she puts bowls of milk and sugar in the four corners of the room; this will cause many snakes to come, led by their Queen. If she stands in the Queen's way, she can ask for her husband; but if she's frightened and does not do her bidding, she cannot have him back.

The princess does as he said, and wins back her husband.

== Analysis ==
=== Tale type ===
American folklorist D. L. Ashliman classified the tale in the Aarne-Thompson Index as type 425A, "The Monster (Animal) as Bridegroom". These tales refer to a human maiden married to an animal husband that, in actuality, is a human prince under a magical disguise. He disappears and she has to gain him back.

=== Related tales ===
Scholarship also points that a story of a maiden marrying a snake being is attested in the Panchatantra, an Indian collection of folkloric accounts and related tales.

=== Motifs ===
According to Stith Thompson and Jonas Balys study of motifs of Indian literature and oral folklore, the tale contains the motifs D425.1.3. "Transformation: snake to garland", and D432 "Transformation: mineral form to person" (in this case, a jewel necklace), B604.1, "Marriage to snake" and D391 "Transformation: serpent (snake) to person".

==== The husband's vanishing ====
In his work about Cupid and Psyche and other Animal as Bridegroom tales, Swedish scholar Jan-Öjvind Swahn identified that, in certain tales, the heroine causes her supernatural husband's disappearance by inquiring his name. Swahn named this motif The Name Taboo and surmised that it occurred "primarily in India". In Thompson and Roberts's Types of Indic Oral Tales, this motif appears in Indic type 425D Ind, "Search for Serpent Husband": the heroine insists to know her husband's caste or name, and he, in return, gives her an answer, but vanishes in the water like a snake. This episode corresponds with motifs C32.2., "Tabu: questioning supernatural husband"; C32.2.1, "Tabu: asking name of supernatural husband"; C32.2.2, "Tabu: asking where supernatural husband comes from", and C32.2.3, "Tabu: asking for caste of supernatural husband."

== Variants ==
In a tale from Uttara Kannada, Karnataka, titled "ಚಂದ್ರಗಿರಿ ಪಾರ್ವತಿ" ("Chandragiri Parvati"), a poor couple is so destitute they wish to die by snake bite, so they bring in a snake. However, the snake they chose as their mercy killer changes into a gold nugget instead of killing them, and the couple send the nugget to the king for a sum of money. The king places the nugget in a safe, but when he goes to retrieve it, he finds a boy in its place. The king adopts the boy and raises him as his prince. Years later, the prince marries a girl. During their marital life, the wife is visited by an old woman that advises her to ask her husband's real name. The prince tells his wife his true name, turns into a snake and slithers back to the Netherworld. Some time later, the princess is told by a cowherd that the snake prince appears on land in human form, which means she can save him. Deities Shiva and Parvati enchant some crystals and restore the snake prince to human form, and the princess and the prince are reunited. According to Kannada scholars, type 425 ("ವರ್ಗ ೪೨೫", in the original) is not "very popular" in Karnataka.

== See also ==
- The Ruby Prince (Punjabi folktale)
- Princess Himal and Nagaray, Kashmiri folktale
- Tulisa, the Wood-Cutter's Daughter
- Champavati (Assamese folktale)
- The Enchanted Snake, Italian literary tale
- Prince Lal Maluk
- The Story of Hira and Lal
