= Himal and Nagaray =

Kashmiri folktale

Princess Himal and Nagaray or Himal and Nagrai (Kashmiri pronunciation: [hiːmaːl tɨ nəːɡʲraːj]) is a very popular Kashmiri folktale about the love between a human princess and a Naga (snake-like) prince. The story is well-known in the region and has many renditions. One version of the story was collected by British reverend James Hinton Knowles and published in his book Folk-Tales of Kashmir.

== Source ==
Rev. Knowles attributed the source of his version to a man named Pandit Shiva Rám of Banáh Mahal Srínagar.

== Publication ==
The tale was also republished as Himal and Nagrai, Himal and Nagraya, Heemal Nagrai, and as Heemal and Nagirai.

== Summary ==
In Knowles's version, titled Nágray and Himál, a poor brahmin named Soda Ram, who has an "ill-tempered" wife, laments his luck. One day, he decides to go on a pilgrimage to Hindustan, since a local king gives five lachs of rupees to the poor. On his journey, he stops to rest for a while and a serpent comes from a spring nearby and enters his bag. He sees the animal and plans to spring a trap for his wife so that the snake will bite her. He returns home with the bag and gives it to his wife. The woman opens the bag as the serpent spring out of it and turns into a human boy. The couple raises the boy, named Nágray, and become rich.

The boy shows incredible wisdom for his young age. One day, he asks his father where he can find "a pure spring" that he can bathe in, and Soda Rám points to a pool at princess Himal's garden, heavily guarded by the king's troops. He says he will find a way: he approaches an opening in the wall, changes into a serpent to crawl through and returns to human form. The princess hears some noise coming from the direction of the pool and questions for the strange presence. Nágray turns back into a snake and slithers away. He returns to the pool twice, and on the third time princess Himal notices his beauty, and falls in love with him. Himal sends a maid to follow the snake and sees it enter Soda Ram's house.

Princess Himal tells her father she will marry no other than the son of brahman Soda Ram. Soda Ram is called to the king's presence to deal with the wedding arrangements. The king suggests his prospective son-in-law should come in a regal and magnificent wedding procession. Nágray instructs his adoptive father to toss a paper in a certain spring, one hour before the wedding, and the procession will come. Himal and Nágray marry and live in a palace built near a river.

However, Nágray's other wives, which live in the realm of snakes, decide to pay a visit to the human princess, under a magical disguise, due to their lordship's extended absence. One of them uses a disguise of a glass seller to sell her wares to the palace. Nágray finds the utensils and destroys each of them, forbidding his human wife to buy any other. The second snake wife dons the guise of a sweeper. She tells Himal her husband was Nágray, also a sweeper (a man of a lower caste). The false sweeper gives Himal instructions on how to prove his origins: throw him in a spring and, if he sinks, he is not a sweeper.

Himal tells Nágray of the encounter and he admonishes her. But she insists he proves his caste. He enters the spring and slowly sinks in, until he disappears. Himal, then, is left alone and without a husband. She returns to her palatial home, mounts a caravanserai and begins to give alms to the poor. On one occasion, a poor man and his daughter pay her a visit and tell that, in a jungle, they came across a spring. From this spring, an army marched out and set out a dinner for their king. Soon after, the army returned to the spring and this king gave them some alms, "in the name of foolish Himal".

With renewed hope, princess Himal asks the man to guide her to this location. They rest for the night, as Himal, still awake, sees Nágray coming from the spring. She begs him to return to their wedded life together, but Nágray warns of the danger of his snake wives. He turns her into a pebble and takes her to the watery kingdom. The snake wives notice the object and tell their husband to turn it back to human shape.

The snake wives decide to set Himal as their housekeeper. They tell her she must boil the milk for their serpentine children, and to knock the pots down. However, Himal knocks down the pots while the milk is still boiling hot, and, as the serpent children drink the milk, they die. Their serpentine mothers, overwhelmed with grief, turn into serpents and bite Himal. A grieving Nágray places her corpse on top of tree, alternating visits between her resting place and the spring.

One day, a holy man climbs up the tree and sees the corpse of Himal, still beautiful as she was in life. He prays to Náráyan and she returns to life. The holy man takes her to his home. Nágray, noticing its disappearance, begins a search and finds her at the holy man's house. While she was sleeping, Nágray enters the bedroom in his serpentine form and coils around her bedpost. The holy man's son, unaware of the serpent's nature, takes a knife and cuts the serpent into two pieces. Himal awakes startled and sees the serpent's corpse, lamenting her husband's death.

Nágray's corpse is burned, and Himal throws herself into the funeral pyre to die with him. However, deities Shiva and Parvati reunite both lovers by resurrecting their ashes in a magical spring.

== Written history ==
The story of Himal and Nagaray is considered to be a "well-known tale", representative of the Kashmiri region.

Indian scholarship states that the tale has existed in the oral repertoire of the Kashmir region, with multiple renditions appearing in both Persian and Kashmiri in the 18th and 19th centuries. According to S. L. Sadhu, the earliest recorded version of the story was by Maulvi Sadr-ud-Din in Persian with the title Qasai Heemal va Arzun.

Local Kashmiri poet Waliullah Mattu (or Wali Ullah Mot) translated the story as a masnavi in the Kashmiri language. In Mot's version of the mathnavi Himal Negyray, Himal is Balavir's daughter and comes from Balapore/Balapur, while snake-prince Negyray from Talpatal (the netherworld). After being adopted by a human Pandit, Negyray marries a serpent-princess, then meets and marries human lady Himal. His disappearance is caused when Himal forces him to take a dip in a bowl of milk, which transports him back to Talpatal. At the end of the story, Himal plunges herself into Negyray's funeral pyre.

Knowles also informed that another version existed with the title Hímál Nágárajan, obtained from Pandit Hargopal Kol. He also noted that, in another version, Himal is a Hindu devotee, and falls in love with Nágray, an Islamic man.

== Analysis ==
=== Name of the heroes ===
Indian scholar Suniti Kumar Chatterji proposed that Nagaray derives from the Sanskrit Nāga-rāja, meaning 'king of nagas' (a nāga is a mythical snake of Indian religion). As for the character of the princess, he considered that her name means "Jasmine-garland", corresponding to Sanskrit Yūthī-mālā and Prakrit Yūhīmāla.

According to professor Ruth Laila Schmidt, the hero's name, Nágráy (Nāgarājā 'snake king'), indicates remnants of snake worship in the Western Himalayas (including the Kashmir region), that is, worship of the nagas, snake-like beings of Hindu mythology associated with water. Also, the Kashmiri word for water spring is nāg, another link between water bodies and nagas as water-spirits.

=== Parallels ===
Suniti Kumar Chatterji also noticed some resemblance between the Kashmiri tale and the Lithuanian folktale Eglė the Queen of Serpents, wherein a human maiden named Egle marries Zilvinas, a snake-like prince that lives in an underwater palace. (Note: German scholar Rainer Eckert also described both stories as having a "surprising correspondence".)

=== Relation to other folktales ===
The tale has been compared to folktales of type ATU 425, "The Search for the Lost Husband", of the international classification of folktales. In Stith Thompson and Warren Roberts's Types of Indic Oral Tales, the tale is classified under its own Indic type, 425D Ind, "Search for Serpent Husband": the heroine marries a man of mysterious origin; jealous women probe her into asking his name or origins; he reveals it and turns into a snake; after many hardships, she reunites with him. (Note: The word "Indic" refers to tale types that, although not registered in the Aarne-Thompson-Uther international index, exist in the oral and written literature of these three South Asian countries.)

=== Motifs ===
According to Stith Thompson and Jonas Balys study of motifs of Indian literature and oral folklore, the tale contains the motifs B604.1 "Marriage to snake" and D391 "Transformation: serpent (snake) to person".

== Legacy ==
The tale was also adapted into an opera by Kashmiri poet Dinanath Nadim.

== See also ==
- The Snake Prince (Indian fairy tale)
- Tulisa, the Wood-Cutter's Daughter (Indian fairy tale)
- The Enchanted Snake (Italian literary fairy tale)
- The Green Serpent (French literary fairy tale)
- The Serpent Prince (Hungarian Folk Tale)
- The Ruby Prince (Punjabi folktale)
- The story of Halahala Kumar (Odia folktale)
- Shashisena Kavya (Odia folktale)
- Champavati (Assamese folktale)
- The Story of Hira and Lal
- Balapora shopian
