= Balapora shopian =

Village in Jammu and Kashmir, India

Balapora Bala Pora Balapur
- Village
- Country: India
- Union territory: Jammu and Kashmir
- District: Shopian

Languages
  - Official: Kashmiri, Hindi, Urdu, English
- Time zone: UTC+5:30 (IST)
- PIN Code: 192303

Balapora, also known as Balapur or Bala Pora, is a village situated on the Banks of Rambi Ara in Shopian district of the Indian-administered union territory of Jammu and Kashmir which is located at a distance of 3.5 kilometres (2.2 mi) from its main town. It is named after the King Balaveer Shah (1397-1450 K.E.), who ruled the area during ancient times. This village has nearly 800 households at present.

== History ==
The people of this village used to do the Bhand Pather in ancient times for the entertainment and this tradition of the village is still being followed by some people. This "Bhand pather" was done near the historical chinar (called Boen in Kashmiri) present in the village and that chinar is known as "Jashne Boen".

Balapora is surrounded by the green apple orchards and the spring of Heemal (named after the daughter of ancient King Balaveer shah (1397-1450 K.E.)) which adds to its beauty. The KVK (Krishi Vigyan Kendra) headquarters of district Shopian is present in this village and also the branch of University of Kashmir (Horticulture department).

== See also ==
- Himal and Nagaray

== Bibliography ==
- Place Names in Kashmir by B.K.Raina and S.L.Sadhu First Edition 2000 published by Bharatiya Vidya Bhavan, Mumbai.
- Murran..My Village by Chander M Bhat, First Edition 2003, Published by Vyeth Graphics, Noida (UP)
- Kapal Mochan, Shopian Kashmir by Chander M Bhat, First Edition 2023, Published by Shivas Publications and Distributors, Jammu
