= The story of Halahala Kumar =

The story of Halahala Kumar, or The Snake-Prince is an Indian folktale from the region of Odisha, first published in 1901 and later translated to English. The story contains similarities to the Odia story of Shashisena Kavya, published in the 17th century.

The tale is a local form of the international cycle of the Animal as Bridegroom or The Search for the Lost Husband, in that a woman marries a man of supernatural origin (a snake or serpent), loses him and must regain him. The tale also contains tale type AaTh 977, "The Eloping Couple and the Robbers", wherein a protagonist couple flee from their families, find shelter with robbers that kill the male half of the couple, but deities' mercy restores the man to life - a type that the indexes only report in India and South Asia.

== Source ==
The tale was originally published by Odia author Madhusudan Rao with the title (Odia: ହଳାହଳକୁମର ବା ଶଶିସେଣା ଅଭିମନ୍ୟୁ କଥା, romanized: håḷāhåḷåkumårå bā śåśisēṇā åbhimånẏu kåthā, lit. 'Halahala Kumar, or the tale of Shashisena Abhimanyu'). It was later translated to English by author Upendra Narayan Dutta Gupta with the title The Story of Halahala Kumar or The Snake-Prince and to English as Shashisena by Odia writer Mahendra Kumar Mishra.

== Summary ==
A beggar that belongs to the Chakulia panda order is childless. His wife also sighs over not having a child. Meanwhile, Halahala Kumar, the prince of the Patala where Vasuki lives, goes to the human world as a little snake, wanting to learn the ways of mankind. He slithers in a river next to the place where the beggar was drawing water in a pot, and is brought home with him. When the beggar goes to fetch the water, he finds a newborn human baby, who is the transformed snake-prince. Years pass, the baby, named Abhimanyu, grows up and goes to school with Shashisena, the king's daughter. They begin to develop an interest in each other, and Abhimanyu suggests they elope to another country. The pair take some horses and depart from her father's kingdom until the reach the cottage of an Asuruni with many sons. The Asurani, a man-eating giantess, welcomes the couple into her abode, and Shashisena, suspecting something, overhears her conspiring with her children to devour her and Abhimanyu. Shashisena and Abhimanyu gather some tools and objects from the jungle and trick the giantess's sons by pretending to be her Swasura (father-in-law). Fooling the monsters, the pair take their horses and flee from the Asurani. The Asurani orders her children to pursue the escaping pair, by following a trail of mustard seeds she tied to their horses. On the road, Shashisena and Abhimanyu realize they are being chased, and the youth throws behind some rattan seeds (which become a forest of thick vines), some coals (which create a conflagration) and finally he lets out some breaths behind him to create a mist. The magical obstacles do not deter their pursuers, so Abhimanyu brandishes his sword and kills six of the seven Asurani's sons, save for the youngest, named Tima, whom they spare and make their servant.

After a while, they stop to rest: Shashisena prepares their food, while Abhimanyu goes for a swim in a pond. Tima, pretending to help him, kills him with a sword, then puts on his clothes and goes to eat Shashisena's food. The princess notices that the voracity of her companion was strange, and orders Tima to lead her to Abhimanyu. Tima guides her to his corpse, and is promptly beheaded for his treason. Shashisena cries over the body of her fallen lover, which Durga and Siva (Ishvara and Parvati in another translation) hear and come to her aid: Siva sprinkles his body with flower and water, and revives Abhimanyu. Later, the duo go to another city, where Abhimanyu is transformed into a ram by the works of a Maluni girl, and Shashisena, pretending to be a man, kills a rampaging Gayala (Gandagayala) and wins the hand of the local king's daughter. Still in male disguise, Shashisena says she made a vow not to consummate the marriage until after twelve months, while she tries to buy time to search for Abhimanyu: she tells the king a story that Siva decided that people from nearby regions should come to his shrine on Baruni-day for purification, a lie that the Raja believes. This eventually leads to Shashisena rescuing Abhimanyu and the killing of the Maluni witch-girl (called Gyana Dei).

Abhimanyu then marries the two princesses and the live together. However, after some time, one of his serpent-wives, from the Nether-world, missing her husband, changes shape to that of a Savari woman who has come to sell Amama fruits to the princess's household. The false Savari says the fruits can grant immortality, but their husband is already immortal - a thing they should ask Abhimanyu themselves. The princesses ask Abhimanyu to tell them the truth, and he takes them to the riverbank. He warns them not to question the truth of his name, but they insist and press on the matter. Thus, he goes near the water, says his name is Halahala Kumar from Patala (from the "Land of Cobras" or "Nagaloka", in another translation), and vanishes into the water as a snake. The princesses cry for him and, noticing they ate the Amara fruits, swim after him and reach the Nether-world, the domain of king Vasuki. Down below, they realize they must earn Vasuki's favour, and do so by ingraining into their court with their dancing prowess. They do a dance number before Vasuki and his court, which greatly impresses the monarch he proposes to reward both women. Shashisena then asks for the prince as reward. Vasuki agrees, but sets a condition: Halahala Kumar shall alternate between his human wives and serpent spouses six months each. His terms are agreed upon, and the human princesses depart Patala with Abhimanyu. The princesses' kingdoms are united as one, and the girls look forward to spending six months with their co-husband.

== Analysis ==
=== Tale type ===
In Stith Thompson and Warren Roberts's Types of Indic Oral Tales, the tale is classified under its own Indic type, 425D Ind, "Search for Serpent Husband": the heroine marries a man of mysterious origin; jealous women probe her into asking his name or origins; he reveals it and turns into a snake; after many hardships, she reunites with him. (Note: The word "Indic" refers to tale types that, although not registered in the Aarne-Thompson-Uther international index, exist in the oral and written literature of these three South Asian countries.)

The middle part of the story, where the pair meets the thieves, Abhimanyu is killed, but the deities revive him, is classified as another tale type found in India, which was incorporated in Thompson's 1961 revision of the international Aarne-Thompson Index. In this type, AaTh 977, "The Eloping Couple and the Robbers", a prince and princess elope and eventually take shelter with a band of robbers, which chase after them and kill the prince; the princess mourns for her lover, when gods heed her cries and restore him; later, the prince is turned into an animal by a witch. However, German folklorist Hans-Jörg Uther, in his 2004 revision of the international index, discontinued the typing.

=== Motifs ===
==== The snake husband ====
According to Stith Thompson and Jonas Balys study of motifs of Indian literature and oral folklore, the tale contains the motifs B604.1 "Marriage to snake" and D391 "Transformation: serpent (snake) to person". In Indian (especially in Odia) folktales, the snake is capable of shapeshifting, and can bear human babies.

==== The husband's vanishing ====
In his work about Cupid and Psyche and other Animal as Bridegroom tales, Swedish scholar Jan-Öjvind Swahn identified that, in certain tales, the heroine causes her supernatural husband's disappearance by inquiring his name. Swahn named this motif The Name Taboo and surmised that it occurred "primarily in India". In Thompson and Roberts's Types of Indic Oral Tales, this motif appears in Indic type 425D Ind, "Search for Serpent Husband": the heroine insists to know her husband's caste or name, and he, in return, gives her an answer, but vanishes in the water like a snake. This episode corresponds with motifs C32.2., "Tabu: questioning supernatural husband"; C32.2.1, "Tabu: asking name of supernatural husband"; C32.2.2, "Tabu: asking where supernatural husband comes from", and C32.2.3, "Tabu: asking for caste of supernatural husband."

==== The sorcerous florist ====
According to Indian scholars, the Jyana Dei appears as a sorcerous character in Odia folktales. She appears as part of a group of seven maidens, called Tantrasadhikas or tantrikas, who practiced a form of Vajrayana (the Tantric form of Buddhism) in a region called Kuanri Patna or Kumari Patna: Gyana Dei Maluni (or Jyanadadei, or Gyanadei Maliani), Netei Dhobani, Lahukuti Lahuruni, Sukuti Chamaruni, Sua Teluni, Gangi Gauduni (or Gangei Gouduni), and Patarapindhi Sauruni.

=== Relation to Shashisena Kavya ===
The main plot of the work Shashisena Kavya is considered to be derived from a folktale. Shri Janakibhallav Mohanty argued that it was an adaptation of the story Hala Hala Kumar, a popular theme in Odisha.

== Variants ==
=== Tale of Shashisena ===
In an Odia tale titled (Odia: ଶଶିସେଣା କାହାଣୀ, romanized: śåśisēṇā kāhāṇī, lit. 'Shashisena's story, tale of Shashisena'), sourced from the Paraja people from Nabarangpur district and Koraput district, a king lives in a palace in the forest, and the queen gives birth to a beautiful daughter named Shashisena. When she reaches marriageable age, the king arranges many suitors for Shashisena, but she rejects them. As she grows older, her parents worry about her lack of husband, even Shashisena worries about her situation, when, one day, a maid suggests Shashisena prays to the jungle Goddess for a bridegroom, for the deity will surely help her. Following the maid's advice, the princess enter the jungle and prays to the Goddess for a while. Some time later, and thinking she will have no answer, Shashisena tries to take her own life, when the Goddess appears to her alongside a large serpent, which the deity indicates is the princess's bridegroom. Shashisena is frightened at the serpent, but the Goddess sprinkles some water on the reptile and it becomes a handsome youth. They marry in the jungle, then decide to make their way to distant lands on horseback. They ride into the wilderness and stop to rest, the former serpent man goes to look for food and shelter and finds a florist woman's house in a nearby village. The florist asks the youth about his presence there, and, after hearing his tale, agrees to welcome him and Shashisena into her home. Shashisena and her husband spend the night there, but the florist woman creeps into their room at night and sprinkles some enchanted water on the youth to turn him into a sheep, so she could keep him forever. The next morning, Shashisena wakes up and cannot find her husband, and asks the florist woman if she saw him. The florist lies that she was asleep and saw nothing. Shashisena leaves the florist's house and goes to look for her husband, while her husband is under the whims of the woman, becoming a sheep during the day and a man at night. Back to the princess, she cannot find her husband anywhere, and prays to the jungle Goddess. The deity reveals the princess's husband is under the power of the florist woman, gives her a boon, and vanishes. Shashisena dons a male disguise and goes in search of her husband, eventually reaching a kingdom where people are runnin about, since a tiger captured the local princess. Shashisena uses the boon given by the jungle Goddess, kills the tiger and rescues the princess, then takes her to the local king. Shashisena becomes friend with the princess's brother, and lives in the palace. One day, the queen loses her speech and only babbles due to the spirit of a witch, and Shashisena, cunningly, mentions the florist woman who knows witchcraft. The soldiers forcibly take the florist woman to the palace and she heals the queen's speech, but the witch's spirit takes hold of the queen's body and demands the flesh of a sheep, in exchange for releasing the king's wife. Noticing that the florist woman is worried about the sheep back at her house, Shashisena asks the soldiers to bring the sheep from the florist's house to be sacrificed. The king's soldiers bring the florist's sheep, and Shashisena tells the monarch that, as she saw in her dream, the queen can return to normal if the florist turns the sheep back into a man. The king orders the florist to restore the sheep to human form and he becomes Shashisena's husband. Shashisena then turns back into her normal form. The pair reunite and tell everything to the king, who punishes the florist by hanging. The tale was described as a "very popular folk tale" in Koraput.

=== Gyanadei Maluni ===
In an Odia tale titled (Odia: ଜ୍ଞାନଦେଇ ମାଲୁଣୀ, romanized: jñānådēi māluṇī, lit. 'Gyanadei Maluni'), in Kuwaripatna live the Saptasakhams, one of which is called Madana, also titled Gyanadei Maluni. Northwest of Kuwaripatna, there is the kingdom of Bera, near Bhopal. In Bera, a prime minister laments his childlessness and prays to Mahamayi Durta for a son. The goddess is pleased with his devotion and sends a vision in a dream, telling him their prayer will be answered. When the prime minister wakes up, an ahi (snake) appears on his bed. With the deity's blessing, the prime minister touches the snake and it turns into a ruby (Odia: ମାଣିକ୍ୟ, romanized: māṇikẏå, lit. 'ruby') garland. Suddenly, the garland turns into a baby boy. (Note: This element is classified, according to Stith Thompson and Jonas Balys study of motifs of Indian literature and oral folklore, as motif D432.3.1 "Transformation: ruby to person".) The prime minister adopts the boy and calls him Ahimanikya. When he is seven, the boy attends lessons about the Vedas under a guru with the king's daughter, princess Shashisena. They come of age, marry each other with the guru's blessings and elope to Kuwaripatna (modern-day Patnagarh).

They stop by the bank of a river, while Ahimanikya goes to buy provisions for them. He also goes to buy some flowers to gift his wife Shashisena, and enters a flower shop. The florist sees Ahimanikya, falls in love with him and decides to have him to herself: she takes some flowers for him to smell and turns him into an animal. She restores him at night to human form, and reverts him to his animal form later. Back to Shashisena, she notices her husband's delay late at night and goes to find him: she dons some male clothes and enters Kuwaripatna. She takes shelter in a Shiva temple to pray, and kills a tiger. Due to this, the local king arranges his daughter's marriage to Shashisena, still in male disguise of Shashidhar. To buy time, Shashisena spins a story that "he" must wait for a year to consummate the marriage.

A week before the time elapses, Shashisena organizes a yajña (a religious celebration) in the city, where people play games. On the last day, the Maluni girl wears a black headscarf and goes to watch the events and brings Ahimanikya with her. During the event, Shashisena notices the newcomer and that the sheep is looking at her intently. The sheep then writes a cry for help in charcoal with its horns. Shashisena then convinces the king of Kuwaripatna to organize an animal sacrifice of black sheep. The Maluni refuses to bring her black sheep and tries to tell the soldiers that it would be impossible to find such an animal. Still, Shashisena forces her to bring the black sheep she owns and to use the white flowers on the animal. It happens thus, and Ahimanikya appears before the people, to everyone's surprise. The Maluni is beheaded for her magics, and Shashisena and the princess of Patnagarh marry Ahimanikya, who becomes the king of Patna. The story then explains that, with the Maluni's death, so ends the reign of the Sapta Sakhi in the city.

=== The Tale of Shashisena and Ahimanika ===
In an Odia tale titled (Odia: ଶଶିସେଣା ଓ ଅହିମାଣିକ କଥା, romanized: śåśisēṇā ō åhimāṇikå kåthā, lit. 'tale of Shashisena and Ahimanika'), in the kingdom of Bera, between Kosala and Bhopal, a king favours literature and art. The mantri (prime minister) of Berar and his wife sigh over their childlessness, and worship deity Maa Mangala for such a blessing. Maa Mangala is honored by their devotion, and sends them a vision in a dream that she will grant them a son. That same night, while the prime minister and his wife are asleep, a snake named Ahiraj slithers into their bed, frightening them. The woman tries to kill the snake, but the prime minister says a prayer in Maa Mangala's name and the snake turns into a ruby necklace. His wife goes to touch the necklace to wear it, but suddenly the necklace turns into a human baby. (Note: This element is classified, according to Stith Thompson and Jonas Balys study of motifs of Indian literature and oral folklore, as motif D432.3.1 "Transformation: ruby to person".) The prime minister is thankful for a son and names him Ahimanika. The boy attends school with the king's daughter, princess Shashisena. One day, she drops a pencil and asks him to get it for her. Both fall in love with each other and Shashisena promises to marry him. Their teacher forbids their relationship, so Shashisena and Ahinamika decide to elope to the neighbouring kingdom of Kosala to live their lives. They ride their horses and stop to rest by the bank of a river. Ahimanika leaves the princess there and goes to the capital city of Patnagarh to buy a garland of flowers. He meets a flower seller named Jyan Dei. While there, a woman named Madana falls in love with Ahimanika and decides to have him for herself: she makes him smell a black flower, which turns him into a black sheep. She keeps him at her house, and transforms him at night to human with a white flower.

Noticing her lover's delay, Shashisena dons a male disguise, enters Patnagarh and goes to look for him. In the city, a ganda (Odia: ଗଣ୍ଡା, romanized: gåṇḍā, lit. 'rhinoceros') menaces the town, and no one has dealt with him yet. The local king, Madhaba Chandra Deba, offer to marry his daughter to whoever kills the animal. Shashisena, in male garments, kills the rhinoceros and marries the local princess. Shashisena delays the marriage consummation for a year, while she goes in search of Ahimanika, and convinces the king to organize a festival. A week into the celebrations, everyone attends the event, even Gyanadei, who brings the black sheep with her. Shashisena recognises the sheep, who is Ahimanika. Ahimanika, in animal form, writes a plea for help to Shashisena, then leaves with Gyanadei. On seeing him, Shashisena arranges for an animal sacrifice to be made to complete the celebrations, and orders everyone to bring animals to the slaughter. Gyanadei refuses to surrender the black sheep, and soldiers take the animal to the palace. Shashisena orders Gyanadei to restore the black sheep to human form, and Gyanadei restores Ahimanika with the white flower. Shashisena kills Gyanadei. The tale explains the Saptasakhi leave the city of Patna, and Gyanadei's descendants depart Patna to found the Shashisena Temple elsewhere. Back to Shashisena, she and the princess of Patna marry Ahimanika as their co-husband.

== See also ==
- Champavati
- The Turtle Prince
- Animal as Bridegroom
- Himal and Nagaray
- The Snake Prince
- Prince Lal Maluk
- The Story of Hira and Lal
