= S. L. Sadhu =

Indian writer (1917–2012)

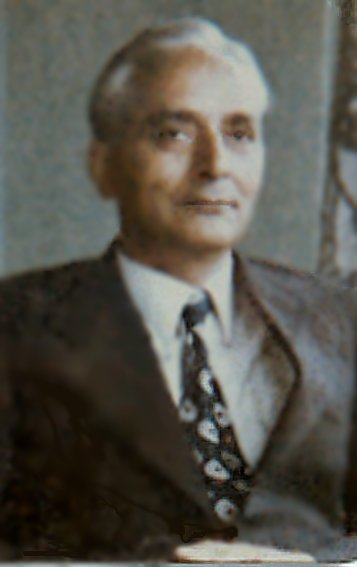
SL Sadhu (1917-2012)

Shyam Lal Sadhu (Kashmir, 1917-2012) was an Indian writer.

He had his early education at the C.M.S. Biscoe School, Srinagar. He took his degree in 1936 from S.P. College, Srinagar (University of Kashmir). He passed his M.A. in English literature at the University of Delhi in 1938. After working as a journalist, Sadhu became a lecturer at his alma mater, S.P. College. After teaching at various colleges as a professor in English Literature in Jammu and Kashmir State he became Principal at Government College, Sopore, and then at the V. B. Women's College, Srinagar.

He wrote in English and in Kashmiri, and in the early 1950s published a collection of stories, Folk Tales from Kashmir.

He received some national awards and a UNESCO award for his book in Kashmiri on Vutsa Prang.

== Works ==
=== In English ===
- Sadhu, Shyam Lal (2018). No Axe to Grind; Glimpses of the life in Kashmir. New Delhi: Utpal Publications. ASIN 8185217378.
- Sadhu, Shyam Lal (1962). Folk tales from Kashmir; with a foreword by G. M. Sadiq. New York: Asia Pub. House.
- Sadhu, Shyam Lal (1967). Tales from the Rajatarangani. Kapoor Bros.
- Sadhu, Shyam Lal (1983). Haba Khatoon. Makers of Indian literature. Sahitya Akademi. ISBN 9788126019540.
- Jonarāja, Rājānaka; Dutt, Jogesh Chandra; Sadhu, Shyam Lal (1993). Medieval Kashmir: being a reprint of the Rajataranginis of Jonaraja, Shrivara and Shuka, as translated into English by J.C. Dutt and published in 1898 A.D. under the title "Kings of Kashmira". Atlantic Publishers & Distributors. ISBN 9788171563630.
- Sadhu, Shyam Lal; Raina, B. K.; Bhavan, Bharatiya Vidya (2000). Place Names in Kashmir. Bharatiya Vidya Bhavan. ISBN 9788172761707.
- Sadhu, Shyam Lal (2003). Rupa Bhavani. Makers of Indian literature. New Delhi: Sahitya Akademi. ISBN 81-260-0922-5.

=== Non-English ===
- Sadhu, Shyam Lal (1967). Bīrbal: akha tavārīk̲h̲ī ḍrāmah. Kapoor Bros.
