= Tulisa, the Wood-Cutter's Daughter =

Indian tale about a snake bridegroom

Tulisa, the Wood-Cutter's Daughter is an Indian legend published as an annex to Somadeva Bhaṭṭa's work, related to Cupid and Psyche.

The tale belongs to the international cycle of the Animal as Bridegroom or Search for the Lost Husband: Tulisa, a woodcutter's daughter, agrees to marry the owner of a mysterious voice, and her father consents to their marriage and eventually becomes rich. Tulisa discovers the identity of her husband – a prince of serpents named Basnak Dau - and loses him, but eventually finds him. She helps Basnak Dau regain his former throne and they live together happily at last.

== Source ==
French folklorist Emmanuel Cosquin claimed that the tale was first collected in 1833, from a washerwoman in Benares (Varanasi). An English language version of the tale, published in 1842, in The Asiatic Journal, claimed that the tale was "a great favourite amongst the people of Hindustan".

== Synopsis ==
Tulisa, the beautiful daughter of a poor woodcutter (Nur Singh, or Nursingh), approaches a fountain, when she hears a voice, with a most strange proposition: "Will you marry me?". Not knowing whose voice it is, she pays no heed. The episode repeats a few times, and she tells her father of the curious happening.

Her would-be suitor is the Prince (or King) of Snakes, Basnak Dau, and promises riches to Tulisa's father, in exchange for his daughter's hand in marriage. She relents to the proposal and moves into a splendid palace. Tulisa marries the mysterious owner of the voice, under the condition that she may never see her husband when he comes to the bridal bed, at night, and that she must not receive any visitor.

At a certain point, she helps a squirrel, who tells her it will return the favor in the future. One day, an old lady (a creature named Sarkasukis, in disguise) was helped by Tulisa into the palace. In conversation with the mistress of the house, the old lady persuades Tulisa into asking the name of her husband. The fateful day arrives: when Tulisa asks him the question, he answers his name is "Basnak Dau", and suddenly the palace and the prince vanish, and leave her there, alone.

Tulisa returns to her parents, once again in poverty. One day, she receives the visit of the grateful squirrel, and learns of the mystery of her husband: he is the Prince of Snakes, dethroned by his own mother. If she succeeds in taking the eyes from the snake that coils around the Queen's neck, by a specific bird (the Huma bird), the Queen will be defeated and the true King restored.

Tulisa and the squirrel arrive at the palace of the Queen of the Serpents in order to fulfill the tasks assigned to her, thanks to the squirrel's help. First, she receives a crystal casket and must fill it with the perfume of a thousand flowers, but she is guided to a walled garden. Suddenly, a swarm of bees come buzzing into the garden, bringing the scent of flowers in bags. Next, Tulisa is to change a bag full of seeds into precious stones: many squirrels come, chew the seeds and transform them into precious stones.

The last quest is to steal the egg of the Huma bird, across a moat filled with poisonous snakes. Tulisa, with the help of bees and squirrels, manages to accomplish the task.

== Translations ==
The tale was published in the West in German as Tulisa and Basnak Dau in Hermann Brockhaus' selections from the Somadeva Bhaṭṭa (Leipzig, 1843) and widely distributed through Ausland magazine (also 1843). The tale was also translated into German by Franz Hoffmann with the title Die Tochter des Holzfällers (Ein Märchen aus Hindostan). and Die Holzbauer Tochter.

It was also published in English in sources such as Household Tales from the East in The Dublin University Magazine in 1869. The tale also circulated in English with titles such as The Wood-Cutter's Daughter and the Mysterious Voice in the compilation The Ruby Fairy Book; The Wood-cutter's Daughter, in The Asiatic Journal; and Tulisa (A Hindoo Wonder Tale).

The tale was also translated to Czech and published in some editions of literary supplement Česká Včela (cs) in 1844 (in segmented format), with the title Drwoštěpowa dcera.

The tale was also translated into French as La Fille du Bûcheron, and the translator noted its "remarkable analogy to the classic fable of Psyche".

== Analysis ==
=== Tale type ===
Later commentators saw common elements with Cupid and Psyche, as written by Apuleius in The Golden Ass. German philologist Ludwig Friedländer and Adolf Zinzow, for instance, treated The Tale of Tulisa as part of the "Cupid and Psyche" cycle of stories: heroine marrying supernatural or animal husband and losing him soon after, then having to search for him.

Folklorists Johannes Bolte and Jiri Polívka, in their Anmerkungen zu den Kinder- u. hausmärchen der brüder Grimm, Second Volume, listed the tale of Tulisa as a variant of German folktale The Singing, Springing Lark, collected by the Brothers Grimm, which is another variant of the Cupid and Psyche and Animal as Bridegroom tales. In the same vein, Folklorist Joseph Jacobs, in his book Europa's Fairy Book, mentioned the tale of Tulisa as having some sort of connection to the Graeco-Roman story, namely, their common motifs: the invisible husband; the violation of taboo; the mother-in-law's tasks; the wife's triumph at the end.

Danish folklore researcher Inger Margrethe Boberg also cited the tale of Tulisa in her study on the story of Cupid and Psyche.

Swedish scholar Jan-Öjvind Swahn considered the story of Tulisa close to his type A, which consists of tales wherein the heroine is forced to perform tasks for a witch or for her mother-in-law. (Note: For clarification, Swahn, in his system, classified type 425A as the "oldest". In Stith Thompson's system, Swahn's typing is indexed as type AaTh 425B.)

=== Motifs ===
In his work about Cupid and Psyche and other Animal as Bridegroom tales, Swedish scholar Jan-Öjvind Swahn identified that, in certain tales, the heroine causes her supernatural husband's disappearance by inquiring his name. Swahn named this motif The Name Taboo and surmised that it occurred "primarily in India".

== Variants ==
=== Europe ===
==== Romani people ====
Transylvanian linguist Heinrich von Wlislocki collected and published a "Zigeunermärchen" from the Romani titled O thágár sápengré or Der Schlangenkönig (English: "The Snake King"). He noted the great resemblance to the Indian story of Tulisa: a girl named Lolerme goes to the forest to fetch firewood and finds some pieces of gold on the ground. She picks one up and sees that they make a trail to a cavern entry. When she sits to rest, a giant snake with "a head shining like gold" and a red beard appears and introduces itself as the King of Snakes, who has fallen in love with Lolerme. The girl is frightened at first but the snake reveals it wants to give her mother great wealth. They marry and she lives a comfortable life, but her husband comes at night in human form. One day, a pregnant Lolerme helps an ugly old woman in front of the cave; she advises the girl who asks herself who the father of the child is, and about the youth that comes at night. She does so: the youth reveals himself to be the Snake King who the ugly old woman, a witch, cursed into serpent form. The youth curses his wife that she will not give birth, nor she will ever see him again, and vanishes. Desolate, Lolerme cries on the forest ground, until a giant cat approaches her and gives her the egg of the Tscharana bird (de), which, if roosted, will hatch a bird that can kill the witch and bring her husband back. Johannes Bolte and Jiří Polívka also listed Wislocki's tale as another variant of The Singing, Springing Lark. Danish scholar Inger Margrethe Boberg noted that the Lolerme story corresponded to Tulisa, although it lacked the long wandering of type 425A, and the tasks of type 425B.

==== Albania ====
In an Albanian tale titled Gjarpëri dhe e bija e mbretit ("Serpent and King's Daughter"), translated into Russian as "Змей и королевская дочь" ("Serpent and Royal Daughter") and by Albanologist Robert Elsie as The Snake and the King's Daughter, a snake slithers into an old woman's basket and, after some time, asks the old woman to go to the king and request for the hand of his daughter in marriage. The king sets as condition three tasks for the future son-in-law, which the snake performs with a magic ring. The princess and the snake marry. On the nuptial night, he reveals he is a handsome prince named "Swift" (Shpejt/Shpeit) underneath the snakeskin and warns that she must not tell anything to her family. One day, the princess is invited to a wedding, and her husband appears lately at the occasion, to everyone's surprise. The princess reveals the man is her husband and he disappears. She goes on a quest for him with a pair of iron shoes, and passes by the houses of the Mother of the Sun, the Mother of the Moon and the Mother of the Winds. The Wind tells her her husband Swift is being held prisoner by a monster named Kulshedra, on an island across the sea, and she begs him to take her there. The Wind carries her across the sea to the island and the Kulshedra captures her, taking her to its lair. Secretly, Swift lets his ring fall into a jug she is washing and she recognizes her husband is there. The next day, the Kulshedra forces the girl to sweep some parts of the floor and not sweep the others, and to fill two cauldrons with her tears - both tasks accomplished with her husband's advice: for the first task, the princess is advised to sweep the floor with breadcrust; for the second task, she is told by Shpejt to fill the cauldrons with water and sprinkle salt over it. Seeing that the princess fulfilled the tasks, the Kulshedra then plans to eat the prince, so Shpejt devises a plan to get rid of the monster: he disguises himself as a poor man and chops wood in the nearby forest. The Kulshedra approaches and inquires the man, who answers that he is fashioning a coffin for Swift. The man convinces the Kulshedra to take a look inside the coffin, shoves the creature inside and burns it to ashes. Now freed from the Kulshedra's grasp, he takes the princess home with him, and they live happily.

==== Romania ====
Author Iuliu Traian Mera published in magazine Convorbiri Literare a Romanian variant titled Crăişorul Şărpilor or Crăişorul Şerpilor ("Prince Serpent"). In this tale, an old peasant couple lives in the edge of the village, in the forest. They live by scavenging from the forest. One day, the old man finds a little snake in the forest and brings it home. His wife decides to take care of it with milk. Time passes; the little snake refers to the couple as its parents and, when he is old enough, decides to choose a bride: the daughter of the Imparatul Verde ("Green Emperor"). The snake's mother goes to the Green Emperor to ask for her hand in marriage, but the Green Emperor sets three tasks: first, to build a palace over the poor couple's hut; second, to build a bridge between their palaces, with gardens by its side, with singing little birds and a bell on each bird; third, to have, under the bridge, water sweet as honey and as crystalline, whose waves crash at the Green Emperor's palace, and where every fish swims. Crăişorul Şărpilor, as a snake, fulfills the tasks and gets to marry the Green Emperor's daughter. After they enter the wedding chambers, the snake takes off its skin to become a handsome man, with golden hair, face fair as milkfoam, and dark eyes. Crăişorul Şărpilor remains human by night and wears the snakeskin by day. This goes on for some time, until the Green Emperor wants to invite nobles from all around the world for a banquet. Crăişorul Şărpilor worries about being a snake during the celebration, but he takes off the snakeskin and goes with his wife. Meanwhile, the Green Emperor's wife, the Empress, finds the snakeskin and throws it in an oven - the story explains that the snake prince's curse was about to end, had the snakeskin not been destroyed. During the banquet, Crăişorul Şărpilor senses the snakeskin was burned, and talks to his wife that he needs to disappear, and he will only be found in the Isle of Snakes ("ostrovul şărpilor"), though the path is dangerous and even more dangerous is the Isle, filled with snakes and dragons. He disappears, leaving the princess alone; his palace, the bridge and the sea also vanishing with him. The Green Emperor's daughter begins her long quest. On the road, she helps a little bird, a hare and a deer, which promise to help her in the future. She then reaches the lair of the Mama Padurii ("Mother of the Forest"), deep in a dark forest. Mama Padurii promises to guide the princess, in exchange for a year of servitude under her. The princess's task is to watch over her hens, but one of them disappears after the princess dozes off. She summons the little bird, the hare and the deer to help her locate the lost hen. The hen disappears again on the next two days, but her animal helpers aid her. Now free of Mama Padurii, the creature tells the princess to cross a dangerous valley. The deer helper advises the princess to seek the help of Sfânta Duminecă (Holy Sunday), who lives in a hut. Sfânta Duminecă asks the princess to work for her for another year, just herding the sheep. With an easier task, the princess performs her chores. For her kindness, Sfânta Duminecă tells that a river marks the threshold between their world and the Isle of Snakes, and that her husband, Crăişorul Şărpilor, takes a bath every morning by sunrise in the river. Armed with this knowledge, the princess keeps walking for another nine years, through nine lands and nine seas, until, one day, by sunrise, she sees her husband taking a bath in the river and goes to him. She embraces him, but he warns her that his family (four sisters and his mother) are terrible, snake-like creatures that will kill her. She decides to remain with him, despite the danger. The snake-like family returns and hisses at their guest, who Crăişorul Şărpilor introduces as his human wife. Crăişorul Şărpilor's mother begins to devise a way to kill her. On the first day, she orders the princess to bake six pies for them, three unbaked and three baked; on the second day, to fill a bottle with her tears. Crăişorul Şărpilor helps her on both tasks. As a third task, the princess is to get a sieve from a draconic neighbour. Crăişorul Şărpilor gives her a ring and tells the princess to use it as the draconic neighbour goes to the kitchen to sharpen her teeth. In the neighbour's house, the princess places the ring to answer for her, gets the sieve and escapes. Finally, Crăişorul Şărpilor and his wife decide to escape from his snake family in a "Magic Flight" sequence: they shapeshift into a melon orchard (the princess) and an orchard keeper (him), then into a mill (the princess) and a miller (him), next into a pair of birds pecking corn on the road (both), and lastly into an elm tree (the princess) and ivy (him). Crăişorul Şărpilor's mother comes to the tree, recognizes it as both her son and his wife, but, not knowing which is which, lets them be. Crăişorul Şărpilor and his wife go back to the Green Emperor's palace and live out their days in peace and happiness.

=== Asia ===
==== India ====
In a variant collected by Alice Elizabeth Dracott, in Simla, with the title The Snake's Bride, Rajah Bunsi Lall becomes a snake and moves to a new home underground. One day, he sees a maiden named Sukkia in the forest gathering sticks and asks her if she wants to marry him. She returns to her stepmother and tells her the incident. The stepmother says she must agree if the snake can fill her house with silver. Sukkia becomes the Snake's Bride, and notices that her husband can transform into human form at night, but never reveals his true name. Sukkia's stepmother, who knows the whole story, convinces her stepdaughter to ask the snake his true name. She does and he disappears, going back to his underground home. Sukkia wanders through the world and arrives at Rajah Bunsi Lall's kingdom while fetching water. She gives her engagement ring to the Rajah's servants, who take it to their master. The Rajah's mother discovers her daughter-in-law is trying to contact her son and, enraged, tries to kill Sukkia, first by filling a room with scorpions and snakes and inviting her to sleep there. However, Bunsi Lall discovers his mother's ploy and removes the animals from the room to protect his wife. Next, Bunsi Lall's mother forces her to count mustard seeds - punishable by death if failing. Bunsi Lall summons little birds to help her. Lastly she makes Sukkia carry torches in her hands and on her head during the Rajah's wedding procession, where she begins to shout she is burning. Sukkia's husband, the Rajah, hears her screams and takes her back to their home in the upper world.

==== Sri Lanka ====
Author Henry Parker collected a Sinhalese language tale from Sri Lanka with the title Rāksayāgeyi Kumārikāwageyi Katantaraya, translated as The Story of the Rākshasa and the Princess. In this tale, a king and a queen have a daughter, the princess. While divining her future, they learn that her future spouse is a Rakshasa. Some time later, the king and the queen die, leaving the princess on her own. Meanwhile, the Rakshasa uses his powers to summon the princess's palace to his location ("wishes the palace away", in the text). It happens thus. The princess leaves the palace and meets the Rakshasa, who takes her in to his mother, a Rakshasi. One day, the Rakshasi tells the princess she is going out to eat some human bodies, and orders the girl to bring seven large pots of water, seven large bundles of firewood, boil and pound seven paelas of paddy-rice, plaster cow dung in seven houses, and have the Rakshasi's bathwater ready. After she leaves, the princess begins to cry, when the Rakshasa appears to her and offers to do the chores in her place. Next, the Rakshasi orders the princess to pay a visit to the Rakshasi's younger sister and take from there a box. (Note: A motif that appears tale type ATU 425B is that the heroine must travel to another witch's house and fetch from there a box or casket she must not open. German folklorist Hans-Jörg Uther remarked that these motives ("the quest for the casket" and the visit to the second witch) are "the essential feature" of the subtype.) The Rakshasa advises the princess to get the box near the door and escape while his aunt is distracted blowing the fire in the hearth. The princess follows his orders and takes the box; the Rakshasi's younger sister chases after her, but fails to catch her. Thirdly, the Rakshasi prepares her son's wedding, and orders the princess to set the tables and chair and prepare the food. After the Rakshasa's marriage, the Rakshasi asks her daughter-in-law to eat the human princess, but somehow she cannot do so. Back to the Rakshasa and the princess, they enter her palace and teleport away. The tale was also translated into Russian as "Рассказ о ракшасе и принцессе" ("The Story of the Rakshasa and the Princess") and classified by its compilers as tale type AaTh 425A. Jan-Öjvind Swahn, in his work about the cycle, classified the tale as his subtype A and sourced it from Hiriyāla, Hat-Pattu District, Northern Province.

==== Indonesia ====
In a Sangir tale collected with the title Bion Gansaļangi Dĕduan Donan Sampakang and translated by Nicolaus Adriani as Verhaal von Gansaļangi en Donan Sampakang (English: "Tale about Gansaļangi and Donan Sampakang"), a king and queen have nine daughters. One day, the princesses go to the river to with their fishing nets to catch some shrimp. While they are fishing, a fish named Lumbake jumps into the first princess's net, who rejects him. The fish jumps into the other princesses' nets until the ninth princess catches him. The fish begs to be spared, and the ninth princess places him a pond. Time passes, and the fish asks the princess to bathe with him in the river. The fish swims upstream until he reaches a place where he takes off the piscine skin, revealing he is a human youth underneath it. The princess watches his transformation, takes the fish skin and burns it. The youth goes to look for his skin and does not find it; he then utters a magical command for golden garments and a golden horse to appear to him. He takes the golden horse and rides past the eight princesses. He then summons a house of glass and 100 slaves to appear before him. The tale then explains the prince is named Gansalangi, and the ninth princess Donan Sampakang. The prince then tells Donan Sampakang she is his wife in the earthly realm, but he has another in the celestial realm, and he is going to visit his parents, the king and queen of heaven. Gansalangi goes alone to Heaven and meets his mother, who marries him to another woman, to his great sadness. Later, Gansalangi descends to earth again and meets his human wife, telling her he will go back home the next day. Donan Sampakang offers to go with him, despite his objections. On the way up, Donan Sampakang sees devils and creatures screaming in a fire. When they arrive in Heaven, Gansalangi warns the princess his mother is a killer who walks with a dagger in hand, and, to protect herself, the princess has to say she is but a slave. Gansalangi's mother comes and questions her son about the woman he brought with him, and deduces she is a princess, due to her clothes and golden-pointed hair. She then scatters millet around the house, and the princess cries. The princess, however, utters a command for the grains to fill a jar. Next, the Queen of Heaven gives Donan Sampakang a white tunic, which is to be washed until it turns to a red colour. Prince Gansalangi utters an incantation to summon the bidadaris to help his human wife. The prince and the princess at last wish to be home, and live in happiness together. Jan-Öjvind Swahn classified the tale as his type A, which corresponds to the Graeco-Roman myth of Cupid and Psyche: supernatural bridegroom and tasks for mother-in-law.

Author J. A. T. Schwarz collected from the Tomtenboan a tale titled Sisil an doro’ i Anak tuama i Tjolano a langit wo si Wawu’ am bawo in tana, translated into Dutch as Verhaal van den Koningszoon in den hemel en de Koningsdochter op de aarde (English: "Tale about the Prince in Heaven and the Princess on Earth"). Folklorist Paul Hambruch translated into German as Die Erzählung vom himmlischen Prinzen und der irdischen Prinzessin ("Tale of the Heavenly Prince and Earthly Princess"), and sourced it from Minahasa. In the tale, a prince comes down from the Heavens in the shape of a goat, and asks a human king if any of his daughters agrees to marry him. The two elder princess refuse to marry the goat, while the youngest agrees. They celebrate their marriage and move out to another house, where she places a basin of water near the bed so she can wash her face. The next morning, the princess wakes up and sees that someone has used the water in the basin, and questions her maidservant, who does not know anything about it. On the day after, while the princess is asleep, the maidservant notices that the goat is washing his face in the basin, and wakes the princess up. The girl goes to embrace her husband. They live like this for a while, until one day, the goat (in human form) tells the princess he will go fishing, and wears the caprine skin again. While he is away, the princess is visited by her sisters and falls for their cunning tricks: she is told to drop a basin of scalding water on him so he will love her better. She follows their suggestion, but the goat husband questions her actions. The next time, the princess's sisters advise her to drop a large knife on him as soon as he comes back, for the same reason as before. The goat goes home and is welcomed with a large knife dropping on him. Feeling mistreated by his wife, he tells her he will go back to his celestial father, and departs. The princess follows him until they reach a mountain, where she rests by his side. After she falls asleep, the goat calls out to the mountain, and continues on his journey. The princess wakes up and follows the goat again, until she falls asleep on his arms. While the girl is asleep, the goat calls out to a "ricebird", and walks away from his wife. Their third stop is a river called "Blackening Water" ("Zwartmakende water", in the Dutch translation), where he bathes with his wife. The goat then explains he is going back to his celestial realm and is taking the princess with him, but, once they arrive there, he will pass her off as a maidservant, since his parents do not approve of his marriage to a mortal. It happens thus: in the celestial realm, the prince's mother asks her son about the human girl, and he says she is a maidservant. As they prepare for the prince's wedding, the queen scatters mustard seeds all over the floor and orders the princess to gather them. The princess goes to her husband for help, and he summons a colony of ants to gather the seeds. Next, the queen gives the princess a basket and orders her to fetch water with it. The prince tells her to go to the water margin and says the prince commanded the eels to come and fill the basket to make it impermeable. The princess brings the basket with water. Lastly, the queen orders the princess to hold torches with resin during the prince's wedding night. Twice, the prince sees that his human wife's hands are hurt by the melting resin, but heals her with a spell. The third time, the prince takes his human wife and both return to Earth. Schwarz noted that the Totemboan tale found a "parallel" in the Sangir story of "Gansalangi and Donan Sampakang". Jan-Öjvind Swahn classified the tale as his type A, which corresponds to the Graeco-Roman myth of Cupid and Psyche: supernatural bridegroom and tasks for mother-in-law.

== See also ==
- The Enchanted Snake, Italian literary fairy tale
- The Snake Prince, a Punjabi tale included in Andrew Lang's The Olive Fairy Book
- Princess Himal and Nagaray, Kashmiri folktale
- Champavati, Assamese folktale
- The Ruby Prince (Punjabi folktale)
- The story of Halahala Kumar, Odia folktale
- Eglė the Queen of Serpents, Lithuanian fairy tale about a maiden and a snake husband

== Bibliography ==
- Bonilla y San Matin, Adolfo. El mito de Psyquis: un cuento de niños, una tradición simbólica y un estudio sobre el problema fundamental de la filosofía. Barcelona: Imprenta de Henrich y Cia. 1908. p. 341.
- Cosquin, Emmanuel. Contes populaires de Lorraine comparés aves les contes de autres provinces de France et des pays étrangers, et précédes d'un essai sur l'origine et la propagation des contes populaires européens. Tome II. Paris: Vieweg. 1887. pp. 225–227.
- Dunlop, John Colin. History of Prose Fiction. A new edition, with revised notes, appendices and index. Vol. I. London: George Bell and Sons. 1896. pp. 110–112 (footnote).
- Friedländer, Ludwig. Roman life and manners under the early Empire. Vol. IV. London: Routledge. 1913. pp. 112–115 and 122–123.
- Hahn, Johann Georg von. Griechische und Albanesische Märchen 1–2. München/Berlin: Georg Müller. 1918 [1864]. pp. 481–483.
- Hood, Gwyneth (1988). "Husbands and Gods as Shadowbrutes: Beauty and the Beast from Apuleius to C. S. Lewis". Mythlore. 15 (2): 33–60. JSTOR 26812032.
- Jacobi, Hermann; Meyer, Johann Jakob. Hindu Tales. London: Luzac & Co. 1909. p. 288. (footnote nr. 4).
- Jacobs, Joseph. European Folk and Fairy Tales. New York, London: G. P. Putnam's sons. 1916. pp. 246–249.
- Morton, Marsha. Max Klinger and Wilhelmine Culture: On the Threshold of German Modernism. London and New York: Routledge. 2016. p. 238. ISBN 978-1-4094-6758-8
- Purser, Louis Claude. The Story of Cupid and Psyche as related by Apuleius. London: George Bell and Sons. 1910. pp. xlvii-li.
- Zinzow, Adolf. Psyche und Eros: ein milesisches märchen in der darstellung und auffassung des Apulejus beleuchtet und auf seinen mythologischen zusammenhang, gehalt und ursprung zurückgeführt. Buchhandlung des Waisenhauses. 1888. pp. 302–306.
- "Tulisa, la figlia del taglialegna". In: Storie di Amore e Psiche. A cura di Annamaria Zesi. Roma: L'Asino d'Oro Edizioni. 2010. pp. 42–57. ISBN 978-88-6443-052-2.
