= Stith Thompson =

American folklorist (1885–1976)

- Born: March 7, 1885; Bloomfield, Kentucky, US
- Died: January 10, 1976 (aged 90); Columbus, Indiana, US
- Education: University of Wisconsin; University of California, Berkeley; Harvard University
- Known for: Aarne–Thompson classification system; Motif-index of folk-literature
- Scientific career
- Fields: Folkloristics; English literature
- Workplaces: University of Texas; Indiana University Bloomington

Stith Thompson (March 7, 1885 – January 10, 1976) was an American folklorist: he has been described as "America's most important folklorist".

He is the "Thompson" of the Aarne–Thompson–Uther Index, which indexes folktales by type, and the author of the Motif-Index of Folk-Literature, a resource for folklorists that indexes motifs, granular elements of folklore.

== Biography ==
=== Early life ===
Stith Thompson was born in Bloomfield, Nelson County, Kentucky, on March 7, 1885, the son of John Warden and Eliza (McClaskey). Thompson moved with his family to Indianapolis at the age of twelve and attended Butler University from 1903 to 1905 before he obtained his BA degree from University of Wisconsin in 1909 (his undergraduate thesis was titled, 'The Return from the Dead in Popular Tales and Ballads'). For the next two years he taught at Lincoln High School in Portland, Oregon, during which time he learned Norwegian from lumberjacks. He earned his master's degree in English literature from the University of California, Berkeley in 1912, where his dissertation was titled "The Idea of the Soul in Teutonic Popular Tales and Ballads".

=== Graduate education ===
He studied at Harvard University from 1912 to 1914 under George Lyman Kittredge, writing the dissertation "European Borrowings and Parallels in North American Indian Tales", and earning his Ph.D. (The revised thesis was later published in 1919). This grew out of Kittredge's assignment, whose theme was investigating a certain tale called "The Blue Band", (Note: The tale that Pliny Earle Goddard collected and published in Chipewyan Texts (1912) is "The Boy who became Strong". The tale Kittredge refers to is the parallel, Müllenhoff (1845)'s tale "XI. Der blaue Band" from Marne in Dithmarschen, Schleswig-Holstein, Germany, translated by Benjamin Thorpe (1853) as "The Blue Riband".) collected from the Chipewyan tribe in Saskatchewan, which may derive from contact with an analogous Scandinavian tale.

=== Post-graduate ===
Thompson was an English instructor at the University of Texas, Austin from 1914 to 1918, teaching composition.

=== Indiana University ===
In 1921, Thompson was appointed associate professor at the English Department of the Indiana University Bloomington, which also had the responsibility of overseeing its composition program. Within a year he began offering courses in folklore: these were among the first courses in the field taught in the United States. His commitment to the promotion of academic research in folklore resulted in the creation of the PhD program in folklore at Indiana in 1949 - the first of its kind in the United States. The first doctorate was awarded (to Warren E. Roberts) in 1953. For this - along with the establishment of folklore courses elsewhere in US academia by his former students - Thompson has been claimed to have been "largely responsible for establishing folklore on a firm academic footing in the United States".

He organized an informal quadrennial summertime "Institute of Folklore" beginning in 1942 which lasted beyond his retirement from tenure in 1955. This brought together scholars with an interest in the field of folklore and helped to bring structure to the growing discipline. In 1962, a permanent Institute of Folklore was established at Bloomington, with Richard Dorson serving as its administrator and chief editor of its journal publication.

== Research and influence ==
While Thompson wrote, co-wrote, or translated numerous books and articles on folklore, he became arguably best known for his work on the classification of motifs in folk tales. His six-volume Motif-Index of Folk-Literature (1955–1958) is considered the international key to traditional material.

In the 1920s, Thompson began collecting and archiving traditional ballads, tales, proverbs, aphorisms, riddles, and the like. At around this time, the study of the parallels and worldwide distributions of folktales were being studied in new ways by European scholars (particularly Antti Aarne in Finland). Thompson had developed an understanding of these new techniques through travel and research and published an expanded translation of Aarne's The Types of the Folktale in 1928, creating a catalogue of folktale types, that included tales from Europe and Asia. Thompson used this classification in his Tales of the North American Indians published in 1929.

Building upon this, Thompson published his "landmark work" The Motif-Index of Folk-Literature in six volumes between 1932 and 1936. The Motif-Index organised thousands of motifs drawn from the folktale types he had catalogued in The Types of the Folktale.

By introducing these techniques to American folklorists, Thompson has been described as having a "marked influence on the direction of American folklore scholarship in the 20th century".

For nearly twenty years after his retirement, Thompson continued to work on his Motif-Index and The Types of the Folktale - he published revised editions of the volumes of the Motif-Index between 1955 and 1958. During this Thompson also collaborated on projects with other folklorists such as Jonah Balys' The Oral Tales of India and Warren Roberts' Types of Indic Folktales. He even produced an anthology at the age of 83, One Hundred Favorite Folktales.

== Later years ==
In 1976, Thompson died of heart failure at his home in Columbus, Indiana.

== Recognition ==
Thompson served as President of the American Folklore Society between 1937 and 1939 and was elected a member of the American Philosophical Society in 1947.

He received a number of Honorary Degrees from universities including University of North Carolina (1946), Indiana Central College (1953) and University of Kentucky (1958).

== Selected publications ==
- Thompson, Stith (1919). European tales among the North American Indians : a study in the migration of folk-tales. Colorado Springs, Colorado: Board of Trustees of Colorado College. OCLC 30703248.
- Aarne, Antti; Thompson, Stith (1928). The types of the folk-tale : a classification and bibliography. Helsinki: Suomalainen tiedeakatemia. OCLC 604047970.
- Thompson, Stith (1929). Tales of the North American Indians. Cambridge, Massachusetts: Harvard University Press. OCLC 1295733602.
- Thompson, Stith (1955). Motif index of folk-literature : a classification of narrative elements in folktales, ballads, myths ... rev. and enlarged ed. Bloomington: Indiana University Press. OCLC 301495255.
- Thompson, Stith (1946). The folktale. OCLC 1156806364.
- Thompson, Stith (1953). Four symposia on folklore. Bloomington, Indiana: Indiana University Press. OCLC 706445956.
- Thompson, Stith (1968). One hundred favorite folktales. Bloomington: Indiana University Press. OCLC 836339166.
- Thompson, Stith; McDowell, John Holmes; Carpenter, Inta Gale; Braid, Donald; Peterson-Veatch, Erika (1996). A folklorist's progress : reflections of a scholar's life. Bloomington: Indiana University. ISBN 1-879407-09-4. OCLC 37282199.

== Miscellanea ==
Thompson's 1954 article for The Filson Club History Quarterly entitled "The Beauchamp Family" continues in use by genealogists as of 2011. In this article Thompson states that he is descended from a Costin Beauchamp (born 1738) from Somerset County, Maryland which extends back to John Beauchamp one of the members of the Plymouth Company.
