= Tea-garden community =

Multicultural group in Assam, India

The Tea-garden community is a term for a multiethnic, multicultural group of tea garden workers and their descendants in Northeast India (formerly the Assam province). They are primarily concentrated in the modern state of Assam, where they have been notified as Other Backward Classes (OBC) and are loosely referred to as Tea Tribes. They are the descendants of peoples from multiple tribal and caste groups brought by the British colonial planters as indentured labourers from the regions of present-day Jharkhand, Odisha, Chhattisgarh, West Bengal and Andhra Pradesh into colonial Assam during the 1860-90s in multiple phases to the newly established tea gardens. They are primarily found in districts with a large concentration of tea estates, such as Upper Assam districts of Tinsukia, Dibrugarh, Sivasagar, Charaideo, Golaghat, Lakhimpur, Sonitpur and Udalguri, and Barak Valley districts of Cachar and Karimganj. The total population is estimated to be around 7 million, of which an estimated 4.5 million reside in residential quarters built inside 799 tea estates spread across tea-growing regions of Assam. Another 2.5 million reside in the nearby villages spread across those tea-growing regions. They speak multiple languages, including Sora, Odia, Assam Sadri, Sambalpuri, Kurmali, Santali, Kurukh, Kharia, Kui, Chhattisgarhi, Gondi and Mundari. Assam Sadri, distinguished from the Sadri language, serves as lingua franca among the community.

A sizeable section of the community, particularly those having Scheduled Tribe status in other states of India and living mainly in the village areas other than tea gardens, prefers to call themselves "Adivasi" and are known by that term in Assam, whereas the Scheduled Tribes of Assam are known as "Tribe". Many tea garden community members are tribals such as Munda, Santhal, Kurukh, Gonds, Bhumij, among others. According to the Lokur Committee (1965) they formed around 20 lakh. They have been demanding Scheduled Tribe status in Assam, but the tribal organisations of Assam are against it, which has resulted in several clashes between them and deaths.

== History ==
In the 19th century, the British found Assam suitable for tea cultivation and wanted to increase their revenue by planting tea plantations, so they brought labourers from different parts of the country to clear large tracts of forest and make tea gardens. Tea garden workers were brought to the tea plantations of Assam in several phases from the mid-nineteenth century to the mid-twentieth century from the tribal heartland of central-eastern India as indentured labourers. During the 1840s, tribal people throughout the Chota Nagpur Division were revolting against expanding British control, and the scarcity of cheap labour to work in the expanding tea industry of Assam led the British authorities to recruit primarily Tribals and some backward-class Hindus as indentured labourers to work in Assam's tea gardens. Thousands of people recruited as labourers died of diseases during the journey to Assam, and hundreds who tried to flee were killed by the British authorities as punishment for breaching their contracts.

The 1870 map illustrating the early tea estates, their proprietors, and the cultivation regions of Assam.

=== Recruitment ===
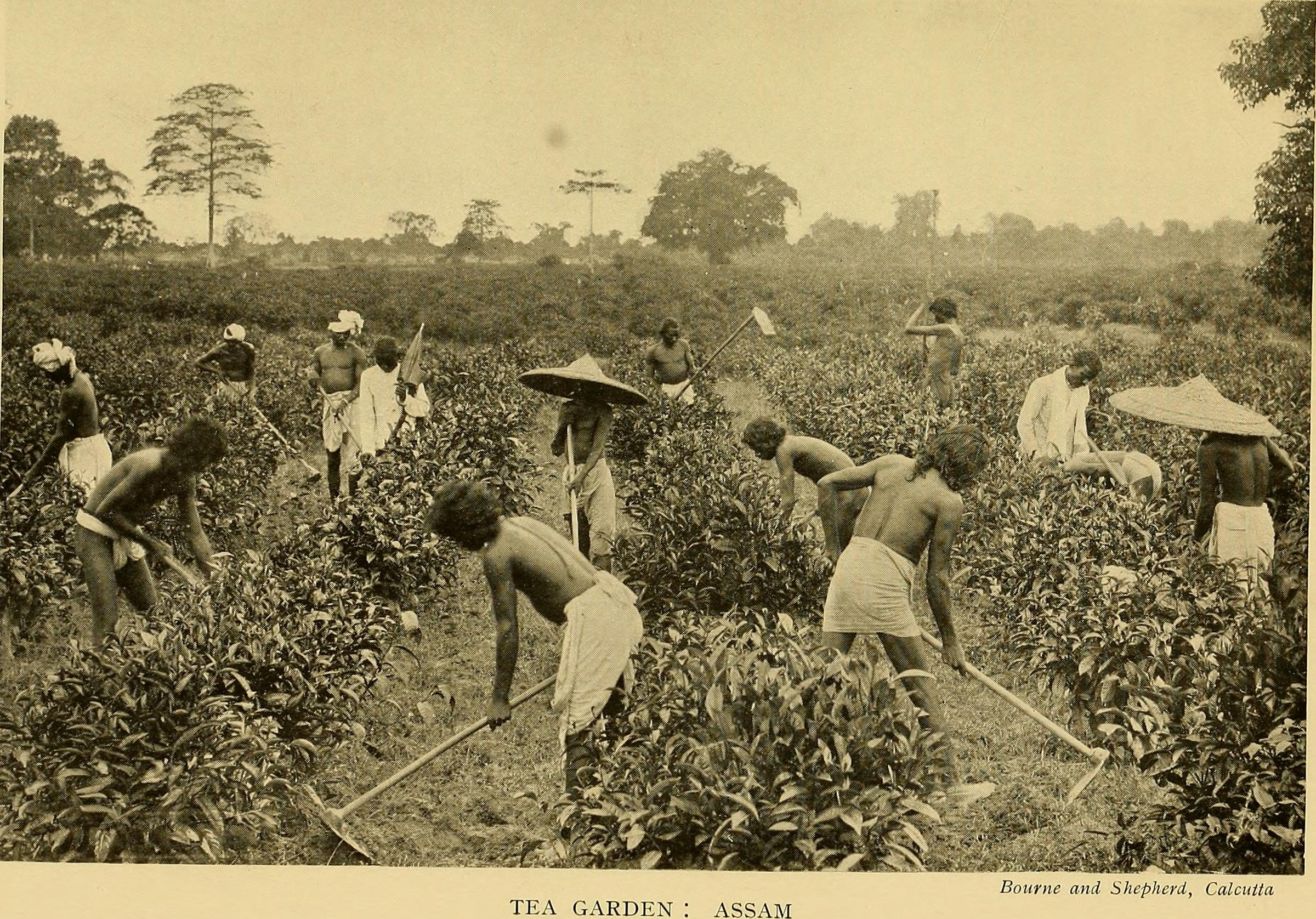
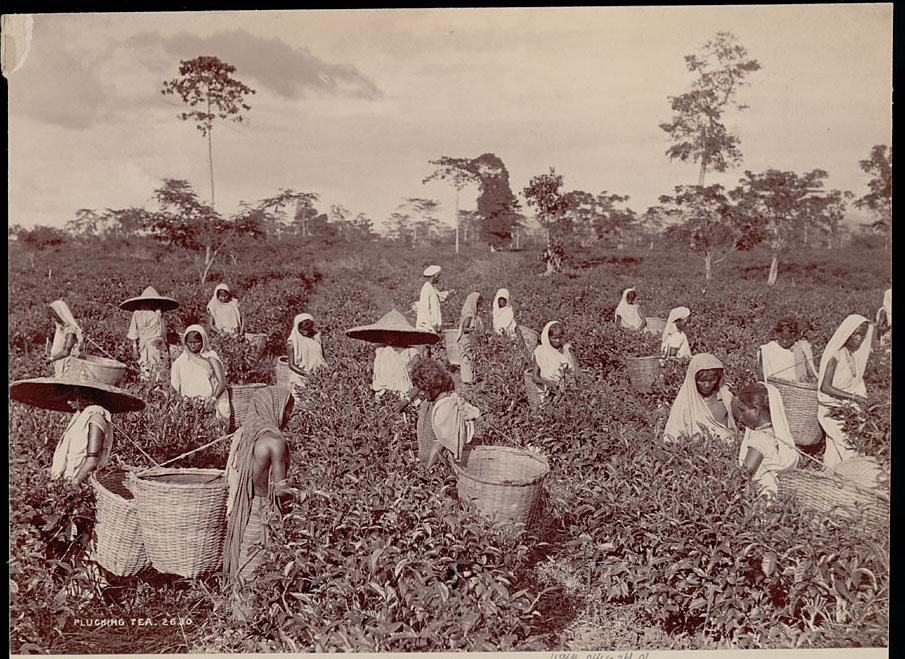
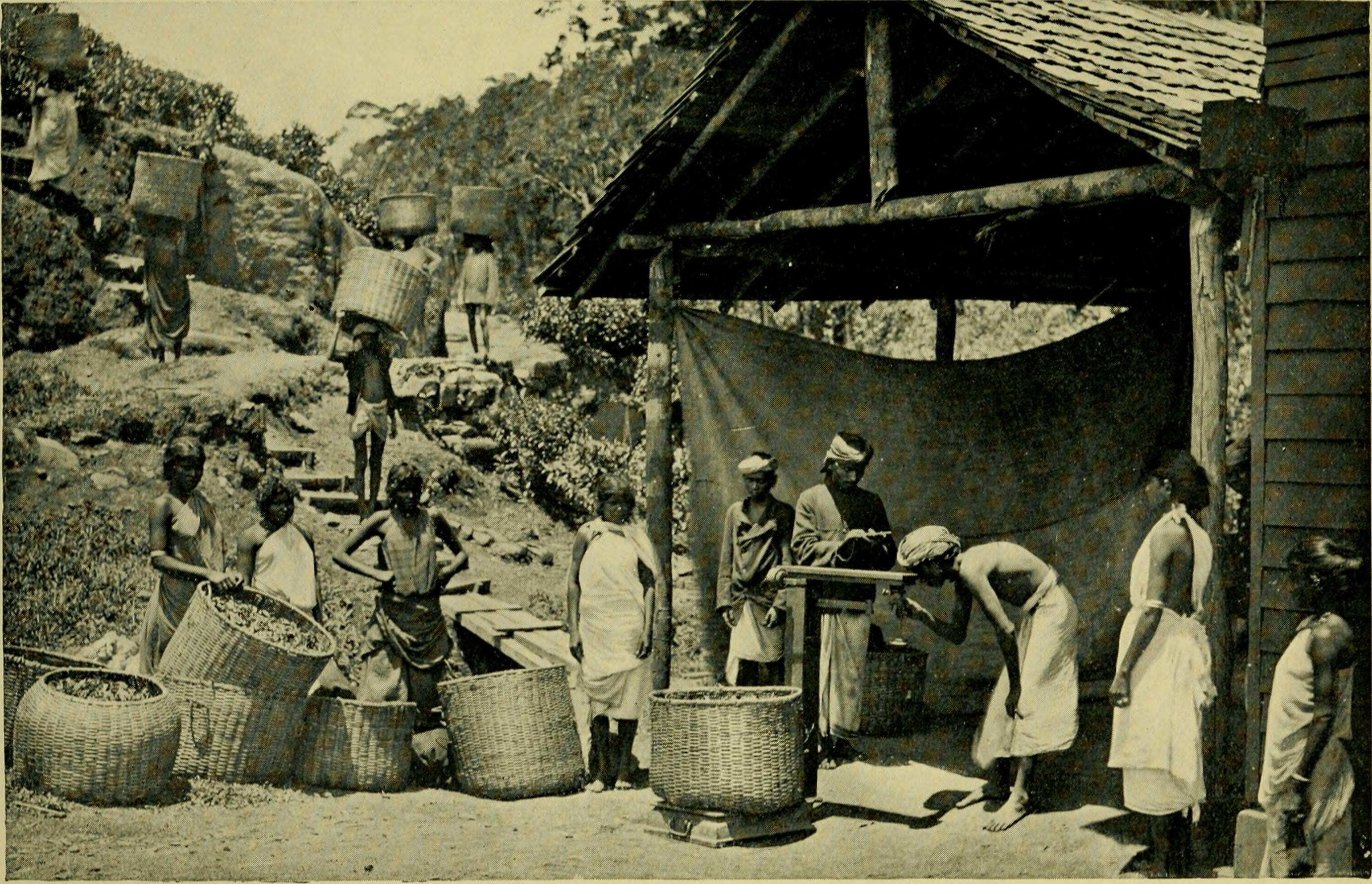
Newly immigrated tea garden workers at work in colonial Assam (c. 1907–1913)

At the start of tea plantations in the province, the Assam company had brought in Chinese staff, around 70 at its peak, and paid them four to five times more wages compared to local labour. The former were dispensed with in 1843 and labourers from Assam were the only ones working in the plantations until 1859 which was around 10,000 vis-a-vis the requirement for 16,000-20,000 for existing cultivation. Most of these were then recruited from the Kachari tribe of the then Darrang district, and peasants from nearby villages during their agricultural slack season.

In 1841 the first attempt was made by the Assam Company to recruit labourers from outside the province. In this attempt, 652 people were forcibly recruited, but due to an outbreak of cholera, most of them died. Those who survived fled. In 1859 the Workmen's Breach of Contract Act was passed, which instituted harsh penalties for indentured labourers who broke their contracts, including flogging. It alleviated the scarcity of labourers on the plantation by recruiting from outside Assam through contracts. "Arakattis," or brokers, were appointed to recruit labour from outside the area. In 1870, the "Sardari System" was introduced to recruit labourers.

Majority of the labour force was recruited from areas such as Chota Nagpur, Santal Parganas, Bengal Presidency, Central Provinces, and Madras Presidency. (Note: This includes areas from the later-created Orissa province.) Most came from the tribal communities of Chottanagpur and Santhal Parganas and constituted 59 and 50 percent of the total men and women respectively in 1878. These consisted of the Mundas, Oraons, Kharias, Kols, Bhumijs, Santhals, and castes such as Kurmis, and Murasis. This was followed by communities from Orissa, Central Provinces, Palamu district in then Bihar, and Madras Presidency. They consisted of those classified as semi-aboriginal castes such as the Ghasis, Bauris, Turis, and Goraits, A smaller number were recruited from low-caste Hindu communities like the Bhogtas, Rautias, Chamars, and Dusadhs.

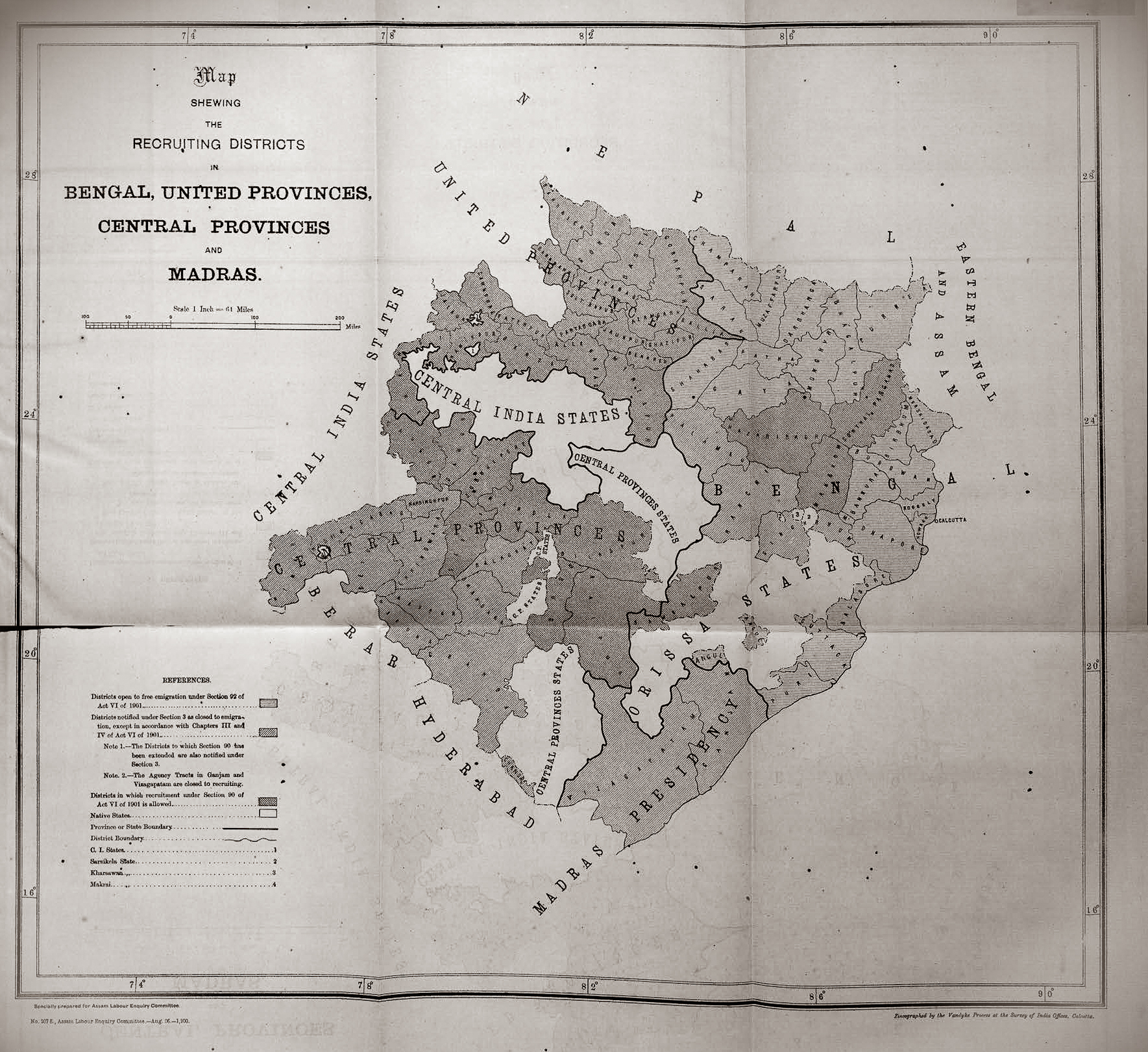
Map showing the recruiting district of tea garden community of Assam

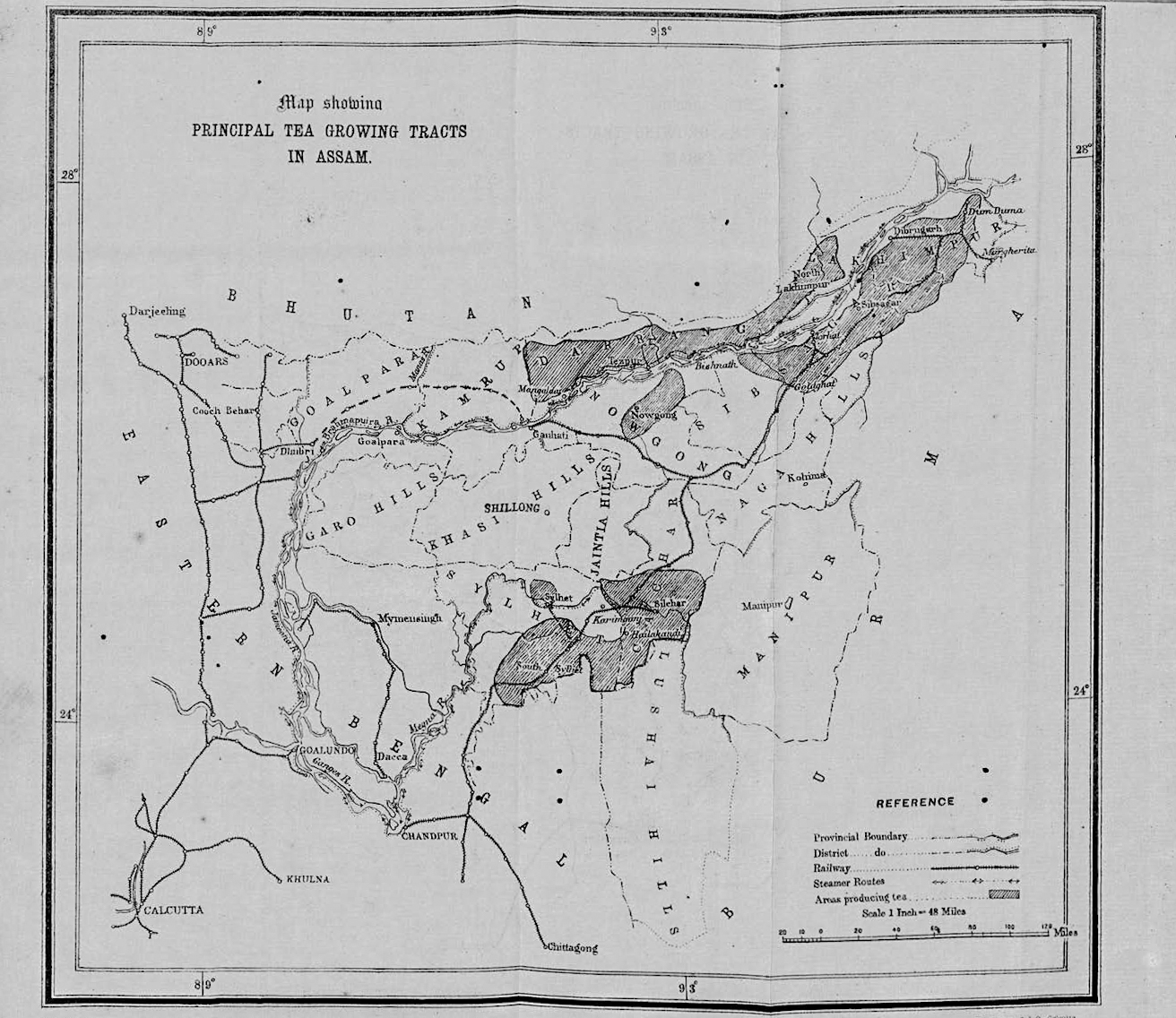
Principal tea growing tracks in Assam, 1906

Conditions of recruitment of labour from Bengal and Bihar were inhuman. Arakattis resorted to several fraudulent practices and physical force.

From 15 December 1859 to 21 November 1861, the Assam Company brought the first batch of 2,272 recruits from outside. Of these, 250 died on the way to Assam. From 2 April 1861 to 25 February 1862, 2,569 people were recruited and sent to Assam in two batches via the Brahmaputra river route. During the journey 135 died or got drowned, and 103 absconded. Between 1 May 1863 and 1 May 1866, 84,915 labourers were recruited, but 30,000 had died by June 1866.

From 1877 to 1929, 419,841 recruits entered Assam as indentured labourers, including 162,188 males, 119,582 females and 138,071 children. From 1938 to 1947, 158,706 recruits came to Assam. They were brought to Assam through three riverine routes, two along the Brahmaputra and one via the Surma.

Under the Workmen's Breach of Contract Act of 1859, Sections 490 and 492 of the Indian Penal Code (1860) and the Labour Act of 1863, as amended in 1865, 1870 and 1873, runaway workers could be punished by the Government alone. Yet the planters themselves generally disciplined such workers, inflicting upon them punitive tortures of all kinds. For labour was too precious to be sent out of their tea gardens to police and jail custody.

Debarken Depots were used to carry the bonded labours. Some of the Debarken Depots in the Brahmaputra were Tezpur, Silghat, Kokilamukh, Dibrugarh, etc. Debarken Depots in Surma (Barak) were Silchar, Katigorah, Karimganj etc. Labourers were brought in ships, in conditions that were far lower than required for the transport of animals. Steamers were overcrowded with recruits and it was highly unhygienic. These conditions led to the spread of cholera among the labourers which led to the death of many among them in the journey.

=== Under British colonial rule ===
After the journey, their life in the tea gardens was also difficult. Planters made barracks known as the Coolie line for the labourers and these were overcrowded. "Coolie" was a term used by tea garden authorities to denote labourers, and is now considered to be a derogatory term by the community.

In these barracks, each tea garden labourer had barely twenty-five square feet of area for their personal use. Many of the tea gardens insisted on a morning muster of the labours. They were not allowed to remain absent in their duty for a single day even when they were unwell. The labourers did not enjoy any personal freedom at all, and were even forbidden to meet labourers working at other tea gardens. Prior permission from the manager of the tea gardens was necessary for the marriage of the labourers.

In addition to emigrant labourers, tea planters also forced labourers to increase the birth rate, so that each garden could garner enough labour force. Abortion was strictly prohibited.

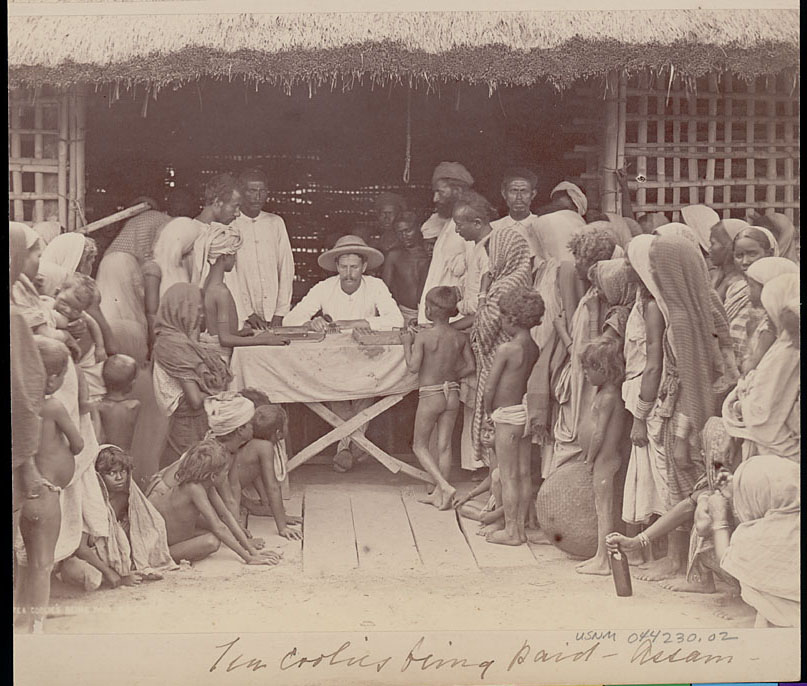
Tea garden worker in queue for wages

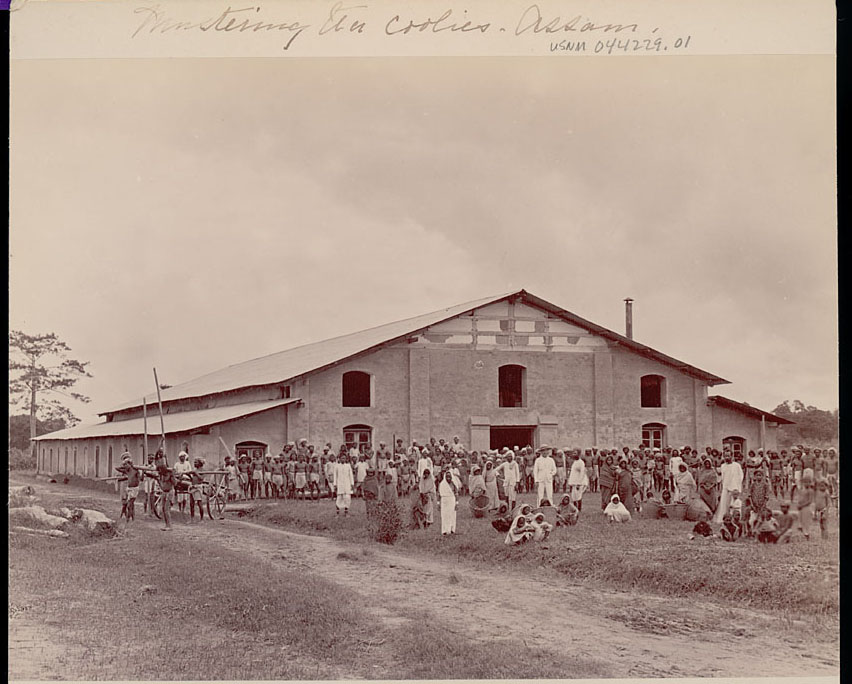
A gathering of tea garden workers outside of the tea processing factory

The wages paid to labourers were very low. This forced the whole of family members to work in the tea garden.

From 1865–1881 men labourers were paid only ₹5 per month and women ₹4 per month. The situation remained the same up to 1900. It was only by an Act of 1901 that wages increased to ₹5.5 for men and ₹4.5 for women. Children's wages remained the same. These rates of pay compared extremely unfavourably with other manual work available: in the early 1880s an unskilled railway construction labourer earned ₹12 to 16 per month (3 times more than tea garden labour).

The tea garden labourers suffered under legal bondage. Their lives were governed by the Workmen's Breach of Contract Act (Act 3 of 1859). Under this act employees were liable to prosecution, and even imprisonment, for breach of contract. Inertia, refusal to work and desertion were likewise punishable offenses for which the workers could be flogged, subjected to physical torture and imprisoned under the provisions of this act. Flogging was common practice in the tea gardens. The then Chief Commissioner Assam Fuller commented on the condition of labourers, "...They were deprived of all their freedom and their derogatory conditions and atrocities remind one of the slaves running in Africa and the global slave trade."

In addition to this, the tea garden manager might abuse the workers physically. A tea garden manager in Darrang district caught a boy in an attempt at burglary, and he was beaten to death. His dead body was subsequently found with marks that showed that he had been cruelly beaten. In Cachar district, a boy was flogged to death because he did not salute the European manager. The most notorious incident was a shooting in which a tea garden labourer was killed by the European planter of the Kharial Tea Estate of Cachar in 1921 after refusing to provide his daughter as a concubine to the planter for a night. Facing such atrocities, many tea garden labourers often become insane. Many such sufferers were confined in the jail set up at Tezpur in 1876 for insane people.

=== Health conditions during colonial times ===
Thousands of labourers died annually due to the lack of availability of health care. The gardens did not appoint any doctors. Though the colonial government tried to make tea gardens appoint European medical officers and send health reports to the government regularly, tea gardens failed to comply. Most of the gardens didn't have hospitals to treat labourers in ill health. Most of the gardens appointed some trained physicians, called LMP (Learned Medical Practitioners), only after 1889, when Berry White Medical School was set up at Barbari, Dibrugarh.

=== State of education during colonial rule ===
A report published by a European DPI in 1917–18 stated that as many as 2 lakh children of school-going age were in the tea gardens of Assam, but not even 2% turned up for primary education. The numbers of the schools and students' enrolment were in papers and files only. In 1950 there were 5,00,416 of children who could attend the lower primary schools, but only 29,361 children attended. It was just meagre 6%. From 1946–50, there were only four college students from tea gardens. The number of students who attended high schools, including M. E. schools, during this period was Jorhat – 29, Dibrugarh – 15, Golaghat – 22, Titabor – 04, Nagaon – 10, Lakhimpur – 12, Tezpur – 41 and Mangaldai – 05.

The tea planters never encouraged education to garden labourers as it would prevent them from physical labor or encourage protest against exploitation. Even after Indian independence, the amount spent on tea garden education in the first five-year plan was just 0.26 million (2.6 lakhs), i.e., not even ten paise per tea garden labourer.

The medium of instruction had also created problems in the tea gardens. Different tribes and castes had their own language and literature in the school owing largely to their original places. In tea gardens, three languages were primarily spoken by the labours: Santhali, Kurukh, and Mundari. But commonly Sadri was used and outside the tea gardens the Assamese language was used as a medium of communication. Therefore Narayan Ghatowar, a prominent intellectual of the community, advocated that Assamese be imparted in the schools only by teachers who knew Sadri.

=== Participation in Indian independence movement ===
Though the community remained oppressed as plantation labourers, they still had the anti-colonial anti-British attitude alive in their mindset.

Noted historian Amalendu Guha remarks, "Illiterate, ignorant, unorganised and isolated from their homes as they were, the plantation workers were weak and powerless against the planters." Still, several times they tried to protest against the atrocities of the planters and managers at their respective estates: for example, protest of 1884 in Bowalia T.E., and the strike of Halem T.E. in 1921.

Numbers of people from the community actively participated in the Indian independence movement. Some of the names of the participants are Gajaram Kurmi, Pratap Gond, Shamburam Gond, Mohanchal Gond, Jagamohan Gond, Bidesh Kamar Lohar, Ansa Bhuyan, Radhu Munda, Gobin Tanti, Ramsai Turi, Bishnu Suku Majhi, Bongai Bauri, Durgi Bhumij, etc. Some of the freedom fighters who became martyrs are Christison Munda, Doyal Das Panika, Mongol Kurku,Sukhdew Chik Baraik, Bhedla Proja, Tehlu Saora and Bankuru Saora. Christison Munda ignited a revolt across the tea garden regions of Rangapara in 1915 and was publicly hanged at Phulbari T.E (near Rangapara) by colonial authorities in 1916. Malati Mem, alias "Mangri" Oraon of Tezpur Ghogara TE (near Tezpur), became the first ever woman martyr of Assam in 1921. She was killed by colonial police while participating in the non-cooperation movement. The names of these tea garden labourers never got any importance in the histography, but as Guha quoted, "It must be admitted that these Adivasis joined in the Indian Independence movement, not because of the Assamese middle class, the Congress or the Assamese non-state organizations, but in spite of them."

== Demographics ==
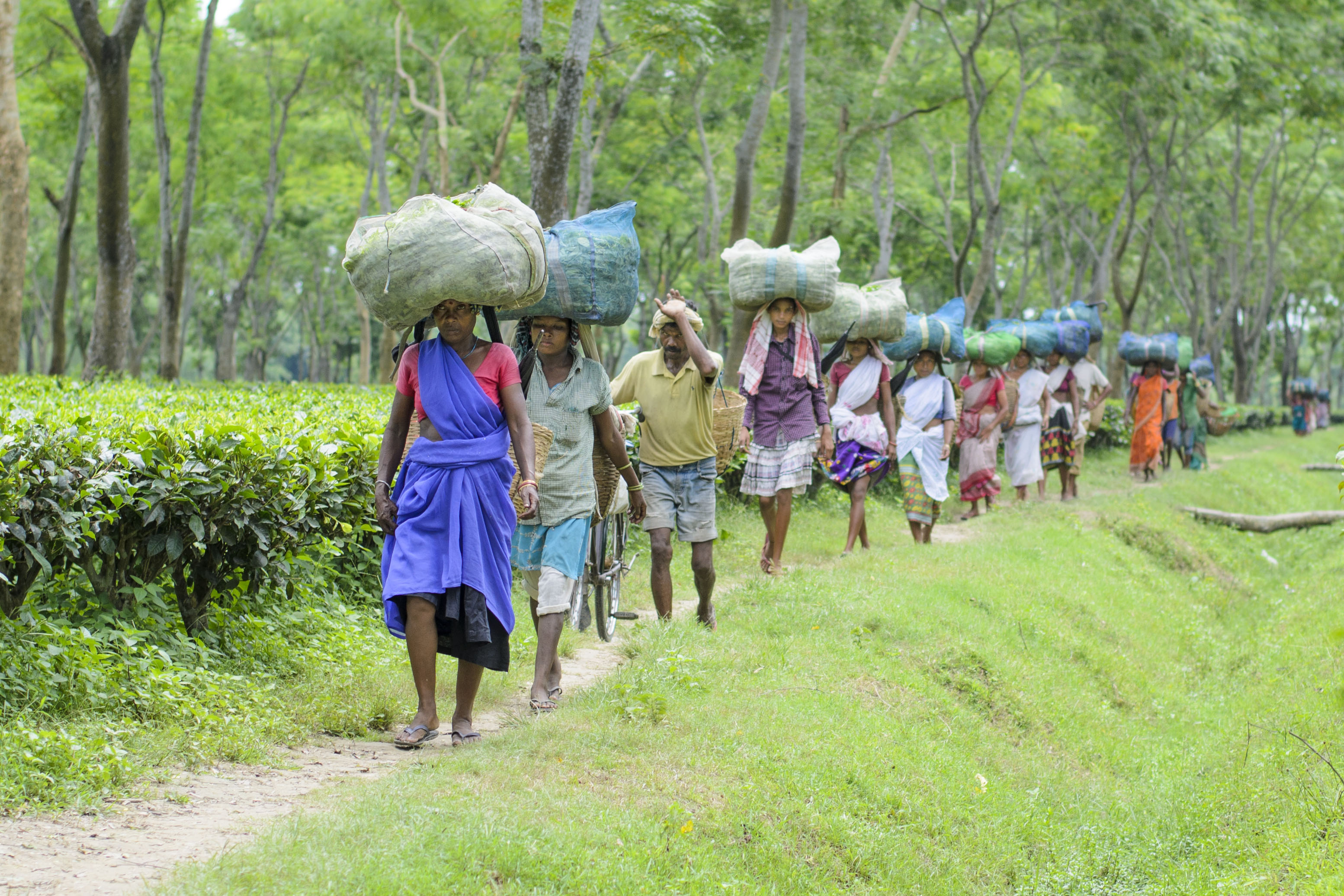
Tea Garden workers in a tea garden near Kalaigaon, Darrang district

Active Tea Garden Worker Population by State and District — Tea Board Baseline Survey, 2018
State	District	Permanent worker	Temporary worker	Total worker
Arunachal Pradesh	Changlang	229	1,136	1,365
Arunachal Pradesh	East Siang	217	423	640
Arunachal Pradesh	Longding	46	100	146
Arunachal Pradesh	Lower Dipang Valley	286	185	471
Arunachal Pradesh	Lower Subansiri	35	20	55
Arunachal Pradesh	Namsai	0	460	460
Arunachal Pradesh	Papum Pare	21	29	50
Arunachal Pradesh	Tirap	78	190	268
Arunachal Pradesh	Upper Siang	0	50	50
Arunachal Pradesh	West Siang	52	130	182
Assam	Baksa	3,666	2,137	5,803
Assam	Biswanath	16,012	16,230	32,242
Assam	Bongaigaon	310	650	960
Assam	Cachar	25,154	17,722	42,876
Assam	Charaideo	24,342	28,281	52,623
Assam	Darrang	1,604	1,680	3,284
Assam	Dhubri	1,133	2,396	3,529
Assam	Dibrugarh	63,884	59,605	123,489
Assam	Dima Hasao	146	196	342
Assam	Goalpara	373	394	767
Assam	Golaghat	33,323	23,934	57,257
Assam	Hailakandi	6,913	5,699	12,612
Assam	Jorhat	38,172	20,788	58,960
Assam	Kamrup	359	912	1,271
Assam	Karbi Anglong	1,212	1,596	2,808
Assam	Karimganj	8,799	3,983	12,782
Assam	Kokrajhar	2,351	4,528	6,879
Assam	Lakhimpur	8,108	7,976	16,084
Assam	Morigaon	651	500	1,151
Assam	Nagaon	12,817	8,196	21,013
Assam	North Lakhimpur	376	406	782
Assam	Sivasagar	15,339	13,746	29,085
Assam	Sivasagar	4,300	3,835	8,135
Assam	Sonitpur	38,128	36,617	74,745
Assam	Tinsukia	64,960	57,823	122,783
Assam	Udalguri	18,972	22,413	41,385
Maghalaya	Ri-bhoi	48	56	104
Mizoram	Champhai	0	40	40
Nagaland	Mokokchung	0	100	100
Sikkim	South Sikkim	402	164	566
Tripura	Dhalai	941	532	1,473
Tripura	North Tripura	2,154	513	2,667
Tripura	Sipahijala	387	128	515
Tripura	South tripura	100	192	292
Tripura	Unakoti	1,294	1732	3,026
Tripura	West Tripura	2,189	1,088	3,277

An ethno-linguistic minority, the population of the community is primarily rural areas and estimated to be around 7 million (70 lakhs), or nearly 20% of Assam's total population (based on 1931 census projection). Other than Assam, they also live neighbouring states Arunachal Pradesh and Tripura.

In Assam, they dominates in the districts of a significant portion of Upper Assam, including Sonitpur, due to the high density of tea gardens and plantations in this region. Districts of North Lakhimpur, Darrang, Golaghat district, Charaideo district, Karbi Anglong Autonomous Council (KAAC) areas, Dhubri district, Barak Valley areas, Bodoland Territorial Council (BTC) areas, and North Cachar Hills Autonomous Council (NC Hills) areas of Assam also have a significant population of the community. They form nearly 11% and 6.2% of the total population in the Barak Valley region and BTR region respectively. According to the 1921 census, total population of tea garden community was 1,220,808, among whom the prominent groups were Munda (149,851), Pan (92,353), Santal (78,736), Gond (50,960), and Oraon (39,739). In the 1951 estimate, their population stood at 1,583,457, forming around 20 percent of the state population. Apart from those other notable communities were Bhuiya (83,383), Bhumij (72,003), Kamar (67,902), Bauri (62,430), Ahir (53,294), Chamar (51,733), Dom (39,037), Ghasi (32,703), Kurmi (31,794), Khadiyal (31,324), Napit (18,350), Odia (16,835), Telinga (15,927), Rajwar (15,213), Jalandha (13,535), Mahli (13,506), Kharwar (13,476), Musahar (13,317), Bhogta (12,058), Dosadh (11,703), Kahar (10,666), Bagdi (10,664), and Gowala (10,255).

Although the Tea Garden population comprises diverse tribal and caste groups of various ethno-linguistic origins, primarily from eastern India, these groups have undergone integration and assimilation, forming new composite local identities through intergroup interaction. Larger groups may retain certain original characteristics, but endogamy is generally less rigid than in their regions of origin. The list of tribes and castes are:

Notified tea garden communities

1. Ahirgoala
2. Arya Mala
3. Asur
4. Barhai
5. Basphor
6. Bhokta
7. Bauri
8. Bowri
9. Bhuyan
10. Bhumij
11. Bedia
12. Beldar
13. Baraik
14. Bhatta
15. Basor
16. Baiga
17. Baijara
18. Bhil
19. Bondo
20. Binjia
21. Birhar
22. Birjia
23. Beddi
24. Chamar
25. Chowdhari
26. Chere
27. Chick Banik
28. Dandari
29. Dandasi
30. Dusad
31. Dhanwar
32. Ganda
33. Gonda
34. Gond
35. Ghansi
36. Gorait
37. Ghatowar
38. Hari
39. Holra
40. Jolha
41. Keot
42. Koiri
43. Khonyor
44. Kurmi
45. Kawar
46. Karmali
47. Korwa
48. Kol
49. Kalahandi
50. Kalihandi
51. Kotwal
52. Kharia
53. Kumhar
54. Kherwar
55. Khodal
56. Khond
57. Koya
58. Kondpan
59. Kohor
60. Kormakar
61. Kishan
62. Lahar
63. Lodha
64. Lodhi
65. Madari
66. Mahli
67. Mahali
68. Modi
69. Mahato
70. Malpatharia
71. Manki
72. Majwar
73. Mirdhar
74. Munda
75. Nonia, Nunia
76. Nagesia
77. Nagbansi
78. Nath
79. Oraon
80. Pasi
81. Paidi
82. Pan
83. Panika
84. Parja
85. Patratanti
86. Pradhan
87. Rajwar
88. Saora
89. Santhal, Santal
90. Sabara
91. Turi
92. Telenga
93. Tassa
94. Tantubai
95. Teli
96. Tanti

Other tea garden communities

1. Bania
2. Banjara
3. Bagti
4. Bhakta
5. Bagal
6. Dom
7. Gour
8. Gossain
9. Ganjhu
10. Gowala
11. Karwa
12. Kishan
13. Malar
14. Nayak/Patnaik
15. Rajput
16. Reily
17. Reddy
18. Rout
19. Rautia
20. Sonar
21. Savar
22. Saora
23. Rajbonshi

=== Languages ===
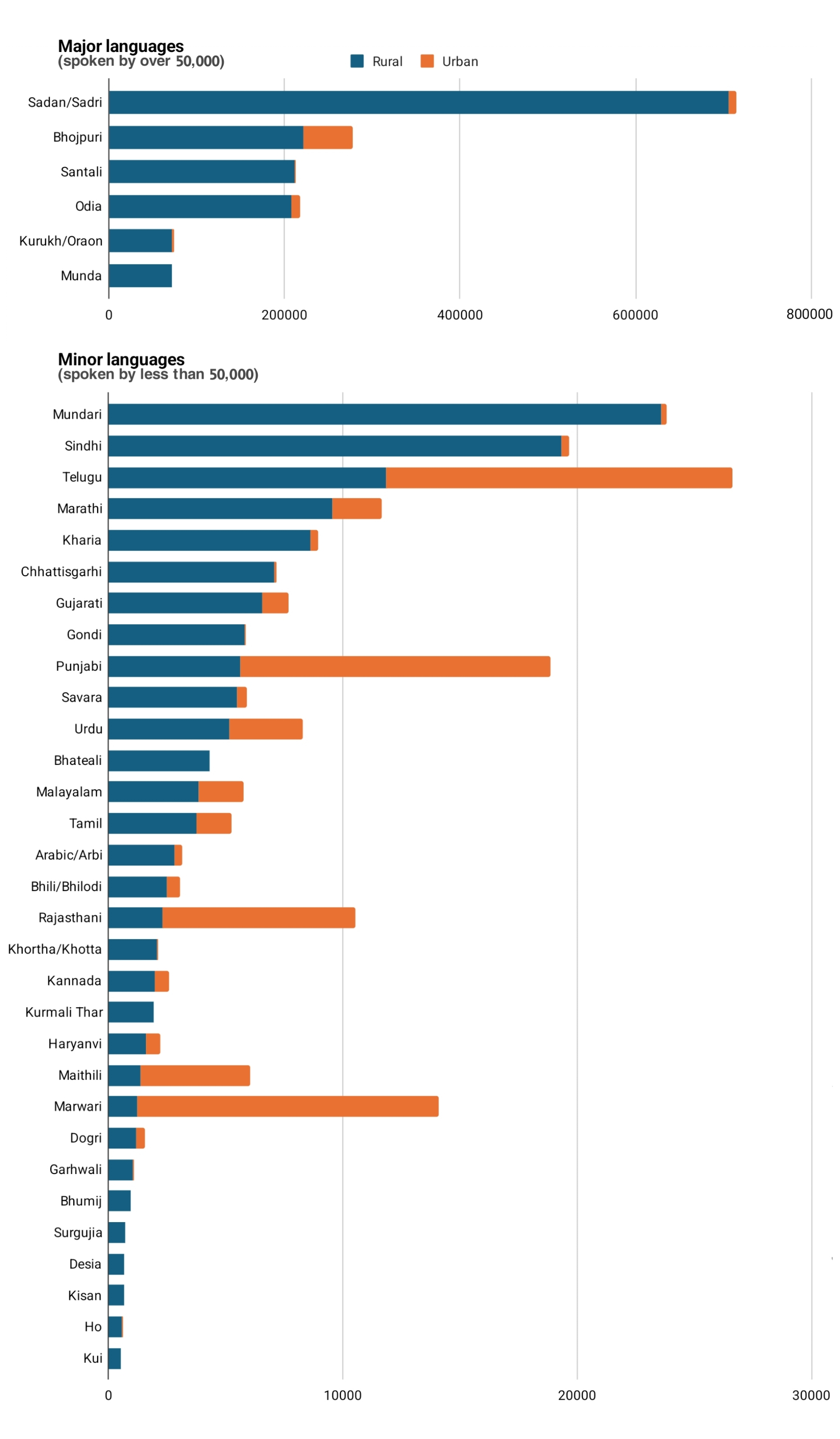
Immigrant languages of Assam, 2011 census * Bengali speakers are selectively excluded—although the language is spoken by millions among the tea garden communities, it is also widely spoken by native populations, totaling nearly 9 million speakers in the state.

According to the 2011 census, the prominent languages spoken by the tea garden community are Sadani/Sadri, Santali, Odia, Kurukh/Oraon, and Munda. (Note: The Munda and Mundari languages are linguistically considered the same, with Munda being a subgroup of the Austroasiatic language family and Mundari being a spoken language within that subgroup. However, in Assam, the term "Munda language" is primarily used by the Munda ethnic group, while "Mundari" is used by both the Munda and Bhumij ethnic groups, and the terms are loosely interchangeable. Consequently, census classifications treat them as two distinct languages based on enumerated responses.) Additionally, Mundari, Kharia, Chhattisgarhi, Gondi, and Savar also have notable speakers. Among these, Sadri is predominantly spoken as a first language and serves as a lingua franca among the multilingual ethnic groups. However, Sadri spoken in Assam slightly differs from the native Chota Nagpuri variant and has several sub-varieties that arise due to dominant linguistic groups, differing in their phonological, morphological, and syntactic features. Nagpuri Sadri, on the other hand, exhibits linguistic features from the Bihari group of languages like Bhojpuri, Magahi, etc., making it often considered a dialect of Bhojpuri. Meanwhile, the Assam Sadri sub-varieties are influenced by languages that are Indo-Aryan, Dravidian, Austroasiatic, Tibeto-Burman, and Tai-Kradai, hence it is often called Assam Sadri or Bagania bhasa. However, with a steady rise in literacy levels, newer generations of those multilingual ethnic groups are becoming fluent in standard Hindi, Assamese, and English.

The Tea garden communities of Assam are undergoing a language shift due to different socio-cultural and linguistic environments compared to their native states. Various groups within the tea garden community are shifting to a lingua franca language, Sadri, while others are transitioning to Bengali and Assamese to varying degrees. Among the tribal groups, languages such as Ho, Gondi, Kui, Bhumij, and Korwa are experiencing significant decreases in the number of speakers from 1931 to 2011, with percentage changes ranging from -65.4% to -95.4%.

Table of language shift
Language	Speaker in 1931 (Note: The language speakers in 1931 also include some adjacent areas of modern Assam, such as Arunachal Pradesh, Nagaland, and Bangladesh.) (Assam Province)	Speaker in 2011 (modern Assam)	Pct. of Change
Punjabi	3,587	18,863	425.1%
Gujarati	2,035	7,660	276.3%
Hindi (Note: The Hindi language includes Sadri/Nagpuri, Bhojpuri, Khortha, Chhattisgarhi, Kurmali, and various other languages, all of which have notable speakers in Assam and are classified within the Hindi language group by the census.)	589,841	2,101,435	256.3%
Marathi	4,317	11,641	169.3%
Tamil	2,106	5,229	148.2%
Santali	101,049	213,139	110.6%
Kurukh/Oraon	56,258	73,437	30.5%
Odia	202,689	218,552	7.8%
Telugu	30,786	26,630	-13.5%
Rajasthani	16,245	10,546	-35.1%
Savara	9,340	5,900	-36.9%
Kharia	14,358	8,921	-37.8%
Mundari	159,156	95,716	-39.9%
Ho	1,729	598	-65.4%
Gondi	49,104	5,855	-88.1%
Kui	6,180	518	-91.6%
Bhumij	16,797	952	-94.3%
Korwa	6,825	317	-95.4%

=== Education ===
In July 2021, Kudmali Sahitya Sabha of Assam opposed the imposition of Sadri language in primary school for tea-tribes and demand inclusion of the Kurmali language in the school curriculum. In July 2021, Adivasi Sahitya Sabha of Assam urged the education minister of Assam, Ronuj Pegu, to promote Adivasi/tribal languages such as Santali, Mundari, Kurukh, Kharia and Gondi. The president of Adivasi Sahitya Sabha of Assam opposed the use of Sadri or Bagania language in schools by claiming it as an artificial language and opposed the term Tea-tribe by claiming it as self-created nomenclature.

=== Religion ===
The majority of the population of the community follows Hinduism and Sarnaism, while Christians account for about 15% of the population.

Hindus worship different deities during different seasons of a year. Most (if not all) of the Hindus are animistic in nature and worship tribal and tantra-related gods. The influence of mainstream Vedic Hinduism is minimal and animistic Shaktism dominates in religious practices.

The ancient tribal religion Sarnaism is also deeply rooted among a sizeable section of tea garden workers. They believe in a universal supreme God and worship him/her in different names like Marangburu, Mahadeo, and Singboga.

Vaishnavism is also steadily gaining footholds among a section of the Hindu population of the community.

They are very religious-minded people and love to worship nature. Many trees are considered sacred and are worshipped. Nearly every village has religious temples and sacred ground (jaher than) for community worship.

However, increasing conversions into Christianity have led many of them into adopting Christianity and many churches have been built as a result. Nearly one million are now Christians in the state. Kurukh, Santhals, Kharia and Mundas are among the major tribes who have been mostly converted by the Christian missionaries. Catholicism and Protestantism are the major denominations among Adivasi Christians.

== Culture ==
=== Festivals ===
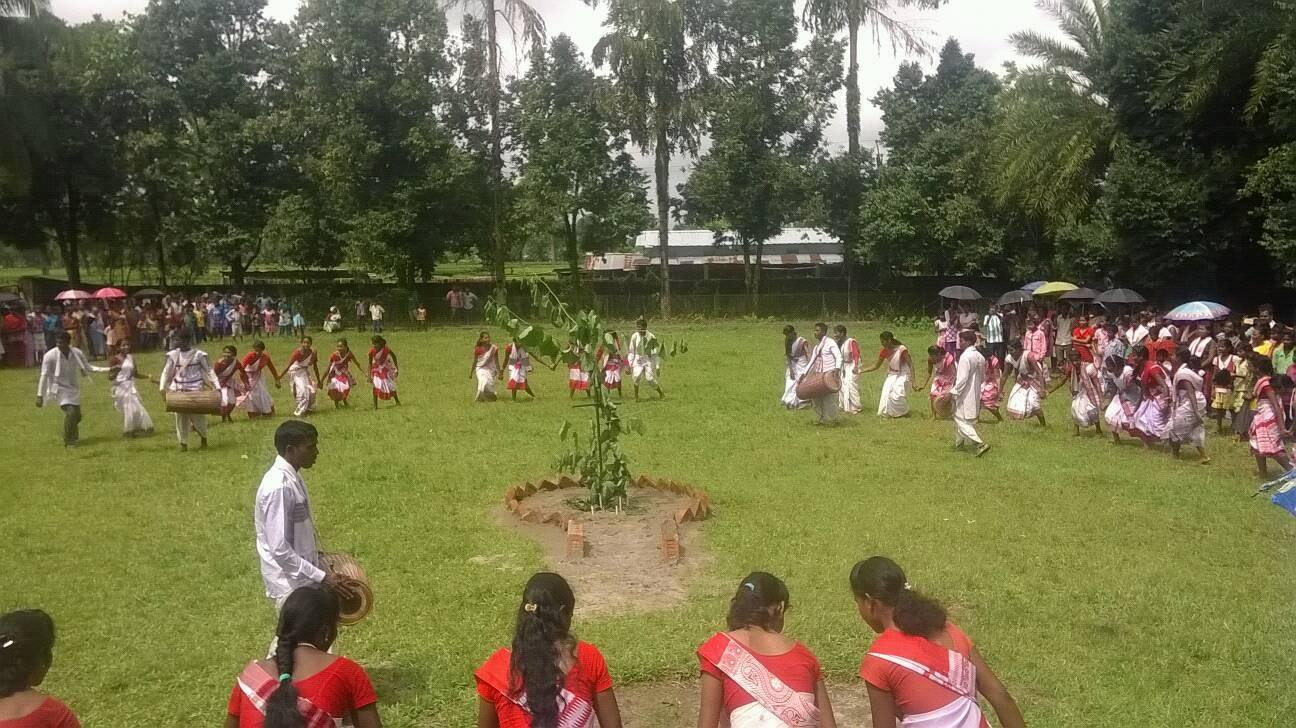
Karam Festival in North Lakhimpur, Assam

Festivals are an important part of their lives and are generally deeply connected to their religion and their culture. They celebrate many festivals during different seasons. Almost every major Hindu festival is celebrated by the community, with Christians celebrating Christian festivals.

Major festivals celebrated by the community are Fagua, Karam (festival), Jitia, Sohrai, Mage Parab, Baha parab, Tusu Puja, Sarhul, Nawakhani/Nuakhai, Lakhi puja, Manasa Puja, Durga puja, Diwali, Good Friday, Easter and Christmas.

=== Music and dance ===
Music is an important component of the community. Their music is usually collectively performed for a variety of occasions like weddings, festivals, the arrival of seasons, ushering-in of new life, and harvests. The community is rich in a variety of music and dances. Through the folk music and dance, they try to convey their perspective on social issues and define their daily lifestyles and their history.

Dhols, Manjiras, Madars, Kartals, Tamaks, Nagaras, Nishans, and Bansuris are some of the musical instruments used by them.

'Jhumair' is a famous folk dance form among the community. This dance is a folk dance prevalent in Jharkhand, Odisha and West Bengal.

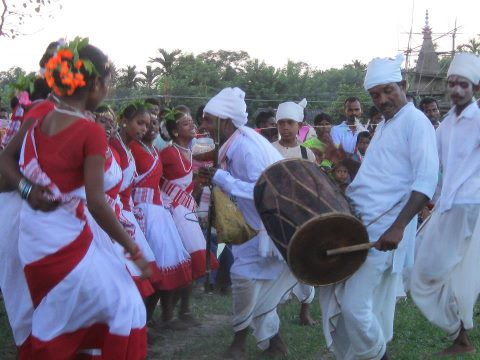
Jhumur dance troupe

It has become famous among the community although traditionally different ethnic groups and tribes have different folk dances. Karam dance is an important dance form that is performed during the Karam festival by boys and girls alike. Other folk dances are Chhau dance, Sambalpuri Dalkhai dance, Santal, Kurukh dance of Oraon tribe and Kharia dance of Kharia tribe, which are performed on different occasions.

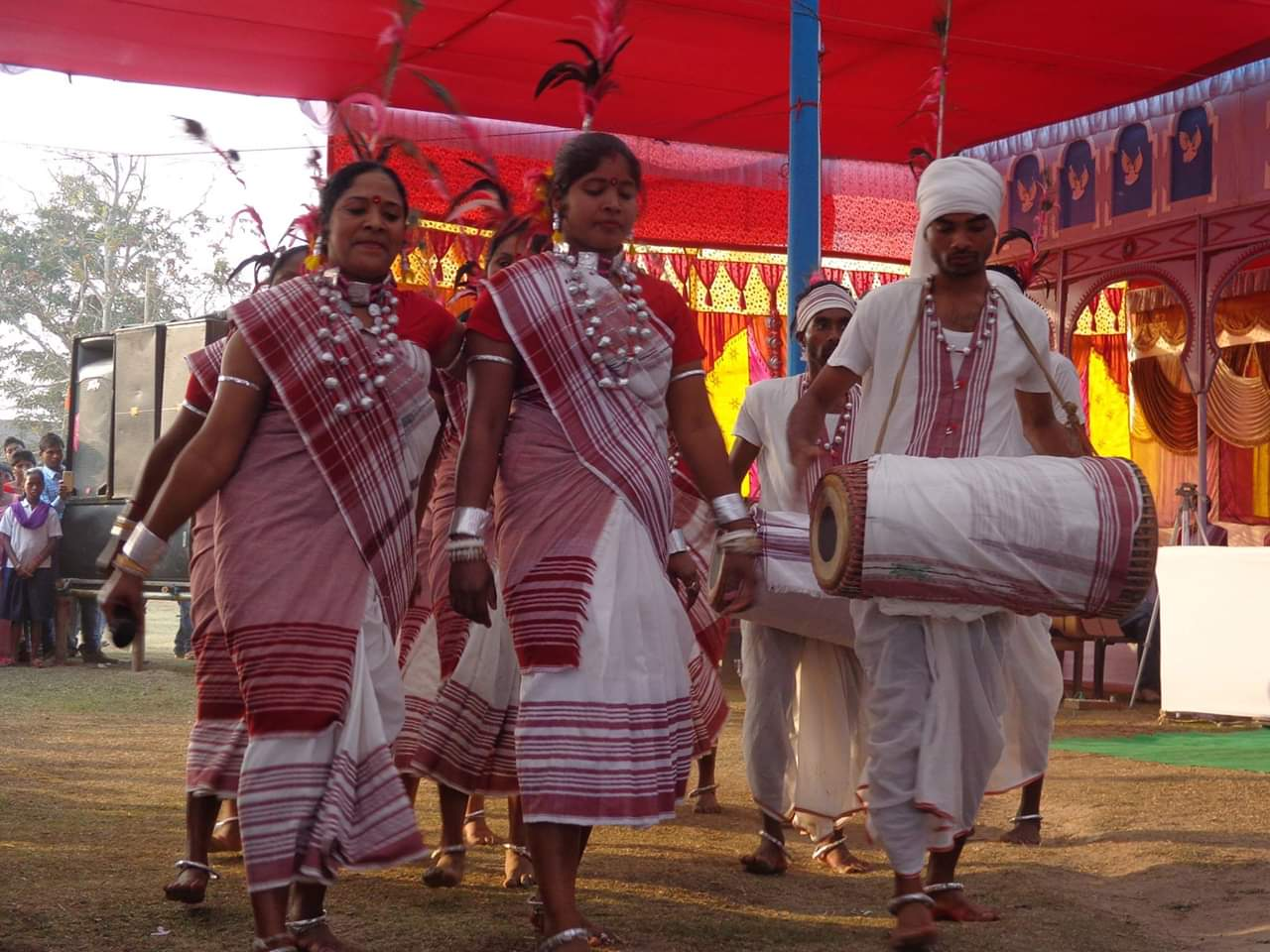
Kurukh dance

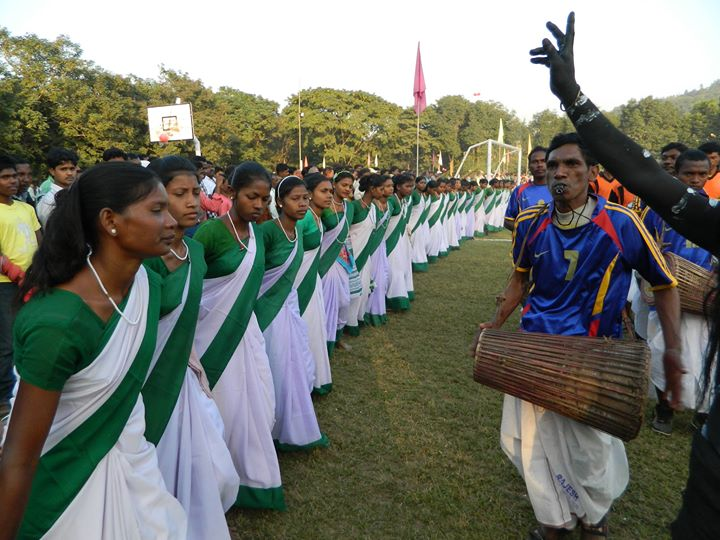
Santhali dance

Dhols, Mandars, and Kartals are the traditional musical instruments used during the dance for music. Usually, the traditional dress of red-bordered white saris is adorned by female dancers along with jewellery and ornaments before performing the dance. Male dancers wear dhotis and kurtas with white turbans on their heads.

== Socio-economic conditions ==
They are one of the most backward and exploited communities in Assam due to decades of continuous exploitation by tea estate management and neglect on the part of the government. Though the younger generations are better-educated and are becoming professionals in various fields, there are not many of those in the community.

The literacy rate of the community is one of the lowest in Assam, particularly among girls and women. Due to this, girls are extremely vulnerable to sexual exploitation and early marriages are prevalent among them.

Since the majority of the community are still labourers, they live in labour lines built inside tea-estates and established by tea planters. These estates are located in remote areas and this contributes to the backwardness and exploitation of them by the tea planters. The labourers in a way have to live with the basic facilities provided by the tea planters. The tea planters usually exploit the workers every possible way. Violence and agitation of labourers against the management is common, where the state machinery normally protects the tea-planters. Non-education, poverty, addiction of males to country-beer, poor standard of living, rising population and inadequate health facilities provided to them are the problems in their lives. There are instances when tea-planters do not even supply the life-saving drugs when workers are dying out of epidemics.

The Assam Chah Mazdoor Sangha has been instrumental in improving the lives of tea garden labourers. Reputed Tea Associations such as Assam Branch Indian Tea Association (ABITA) and Bharatiya Cha Parishad (BCP) have been working with organizations such as UNICEF and the Government of Assam to improve the lives of the tea garden labourers. The ABITA has embarked on a partnership with National Rural Health Mission (NRHM) of the government of India promoted and partnered by the government of Assam. This assistance of the government of Assam for an all-inclusive Medicare system is now available in 105 estates of its membership. The residents of the estates have benefited from the PPP mode as was decided by the government of Assam since 2007. Another unique direction that the ABITA took was its partnership with UNICEF. An intervention which started in 2000 through the Education, Creche Development & Nutrition Programme, later expanded and diversified into a more structured intervention to promote health, nutrition, sanitation and child rights amongst the tea workers population.

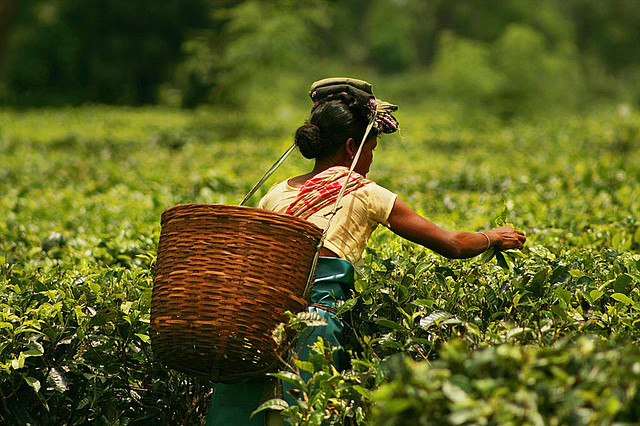
A woman picking tea in a Tea garden of Assam

The tea industry is a crucial part of the Indian economy. Assam produces 55% of India's total production of tea. It is a labour-intensive industry and highly dependent on a large workforce. It is the only sector where the majority of the workers are female.

About one million labourers are dependent on Assam's tea industry and almost all of them are the descendants of those who were brought to Assam as labourers by East India Company, mostly from Jharkhand and Orissa. The sacrifice, toil and hard work of these labourers gave shape to the tea industry of Assam. However, the story behind the tea cultivation, plucking and processing of tea leaves in the plantations is one of exploitation and untold hardships for the tea labourers. These labourers are still living with the basic facilities provided by the tea planters or companies. Poor standard of living and lack of education and health facilities are the main problems of tea labourers.

Literacy level among the community is only 46%, one of the lowest against Assam's 72% overall literacy rate as tea garden management and other vested interests hinder in their educational development.

The government of Assam has a full fledged "Tea-tribes and Adivasi welfare department" for looking after the socio-economic welfare of the community. There also exist an Adivasi Development Council and Tea & Ex-Tea Garden Tribes Development Council to look after specific development needs of the community. But Adivasi students' organisation AASAA has demanded an extension of the area of the Adivasi Development Council to all parts of Assam, as it is currently operational in only sixth scheduled areas of the state.

There have also been demands for the formation of an autonomous satellite council for Adivasis in Assam.

=== Demand for Scheduled Tribe status ===
The tea garden community of Assam is largely composed of tribal groups, popularly known as Adivasis, such as the Munda, Santhal, Kurukh (Oraon), Gond, Bhumij, and several others. Historically, they were regarded by the colonial administration as a distinct social group, separate from the native population of Assam. After independence, this distinction continued due to socio-political considerations, and they were not included in the Presidential Scheduled Tribes list, which required a community to be indigenous to the respective state or union territory. Successive post-independence commissions, including the Kalelkar, Mandal Commissions, Backward Classes Commission, and the Scheduled Areas and Scheduled Tribes Commission (1961), maintained this position by classifying them under the category of Other Backward Classes (OBCs), while the Dhebar Commission and later the A. K. Chand and Pataskar Commissions supported their inclusion.

However, these Adivasi groups are recognised as Scheduled Tribes (STs) in the states and union territories where they are considered indigenous, such as Jharkhand, West Bengal, Odisha, and Chhattisgarh. This socio-political distinction between the Adivasi and the indigenous tribal populations of Assam has given rise to identity politics. The Adivasi communities have continuously demanded inclusion in the Scheduled Tribes list, citing socio-economic backwardness and lack of land rights, while the existing Scheduled Tribes have opposed their inclusion on the grounds of their non-indigenous origin, as defined by the Constitution.

The prolonged controversy regarding the inclusion of Adivasis in the Scheduled Tribes list gave rise to several militant and protest organisations on both sides, leading to incidents of violence, killings, and displacement. Political parties have at times extended intermittent support for the inclusion of Adivasis, particularly during elections; however, such efforts have often fallen through due to constitutional constraints and opposing political pressures. For instance, on 1 August 1977, the Government of Assam recommended nine notable tribes including Gond, Munda, Oraon, Santhal, Saora, Pan, Praja, Bhil and Koya for inclusion in the list; however, the Registrar General of India (RGI) did not concur with the proposal. Similarly, in 2011, the Government of Assam constituted an three members expert committee to assess the demands of the Adivasi communities for Scheduled Tribe recognition. The committee identified 36 groups as Scheduled Tribes, 27 as Scheduled Castes and 11 as Other Backward Classes in their respective states of origin, thus fulfilling the eligibility criteria and recommending their inclusion in Assam’s Scheduled Tribes list. The state government subsequently forwarded the proposal of 36 tribal groups to the Ministry of Tribal Affairs and the RGI. However, the RGI maintained its earlier position, stating:

It was decided not to include the Tea Garden Labourers in the list of Scheduled Tribes of Assam on the ground that these are migrants from other states and over generations have lost their tribal characteristics. Further, this office had also argued that inclusion of Tea Garden Labourers in the list of Scheduled Tribes in Assam was contrary to the spirit of Article 342 of the Constitution, which specifies that listing of communities as Scheduled is not ‘universal’ or applicable throughout the country.

According to S.D. Pando, one of the three members of the expert committee reported that among the 96 ethnic groups who are officially listed as Tea-tribes in Assam, nearly 40 are recognised as "Tribals" or Scheduled Tribes (ST) in other parts of India, while the "non-tribals" among the Tea-garden community distributed in 50 groups are categorized as Scheduled castes (SC) and Other Backward classes (OBC) in states outside Assam like Jharkhand and Odisha. The population of these 50 "non-tribals" ethnic groups is less than two lakhs (200,000), according to government estimates compared to the substantially higher population of the 40 "tribal" groups.

On 8 January 2019, the central government led by Bharatiya Janata Party approved The Constitution (Scheduled Tribes) Order (Amendment) Bill 2019 in Cabinet to accord "Scheduled Tribe" status to at least 36 tribes of this community and tabled it in Parliament. The bill passed in the Lok Sabha but failed to make it through Rajya Sabha on the last day of the budget session due to lack of time.

=== Increase in wage issue ===
The issue of wage is another issue gripping the majority members of this community. They are demanding an increase in daily wages of tea garden workers of the state from the existing daily wage of ₹167 ($2.1) to ₹350 ($5).

As cited, ₹167 as a daily wage for tea garden workers did not fulfill the provisions of the Minimum Wage Act, 1948, as it is below the Assam government's prescribed minimum wage for organized workers (₹290). Wages in the tea gardens of Barak Valley are even more meagre (₹115 per day). Also, according to the Plantation Labour Act, 1951, and the Minimum Wage Act, 1948, costs associated with housing, medical and electricity could not be included as part of minimum wages.

Southern states of India have been successful in increasing the daily wages of tea garden workers while maintaining the industry profitable. The daily wage is ₹310 ($5) in Kerala.

It is estimated that 10 lakhs (1 million) labourers, including casual workers working in over 850 tea gardens, are deprived of their right of minimum wages in Assam.

Though in 2018 the wages of tea garden workers improved considerably to ₹167 by the government of Assam, it is still well below the ₹350 demanded by the workers. The wages of tea garden labourers are revised every few years through agreements between the Consultative Committee of Plantation Associations (CCPA) and the Assam Chah Mazdoor Sangha (ACMS). Tea garden labourers of the Brahmaputra Valley in Assam get ₹167 as a daily wage, but including statutory and non-statutory benefits and other benefits, their daily wage is around ₹214 per day. They also get housing facilities from the tea garden management and avail free medical benefits.

=== Human rights issues ===
The persecution of the community is mainly political and ethnic in nature. They are increasingly becoming the victims of a volatile social and political situation in Assam. The violence upon the community has risen following the rise of ethnic nationalism and related militancy across the state and violent arising out of border disputes of Assam with other states. There were two ethnic clashes between Bodo and Adivasi during the 1990s at the height of the Bodoland statehood movement when National Democratic Front of Boroland (NDFB) militants initiated ethnic cleansings against the Adivasi population in Kokrajhar. Hundreds of people from both communities were victims of those ethnic clashes. Thousands of people were made homeless in the clashes of 1996 and 1998.

A tripartite Adivasi Peace Accord signed between the Central Ministry of Home Affairs, the government of Assam and 8 armed cease fire Adivasi rebel groups on 15 September 2022 guaranteed the formation of an Adivasi Welfare and Development Council with headquarters at Guwahati along with a special development package of Rs.1000 crores for socio-economic and educational upliftment of Adivasi communities with focused infrastructure development in Adivasi inhabiting villages/tea gardens of Assam.

- 8 Adivasi students lost their lives in police firing at Paneri in Udalguri district on 25 July 2003 when they were blocking the national highway during the 12 hour Assam Bandh by All Adivasi Students Association of Assam (AASAA) demanding Scheduled Tribes status.
- In November 2007, five individuals lost their lives and at least 250 were injured when a rally demanding Scheduled Tribe status by All Adivasi Students Association of Assam (AASAA) turned violent between the participants and locals in Guwahati, the state capital of Assam. A teenage tribal girl and a woman were molested in the daylight during the violence.
- Many living in the border areas of Sonitpur, and Lakhimpur districts have lost their lives during violence arising out of the Assam-Arunachal Pradesh border dispute from 1992 to 2014 due to attacks by armed miscreants from the Arunachal Pradesh side.
- In October–November 2010, thousands of Tribals, including women and children, were forcefully evicted by the Forest Department of Assam without prior notice from the Lungsung forest area under Haltugaon Forest division in Kokrajhar district of Assam due to illegal encroachment of forest lands. The Forest department burnt down hundreds of houses in 59 villages in the Lungsung forest area during the eviction drive and perpetrated various atrocities on the Adivasi villagers, mostly Santhals and Oraons. About 1200 to 1400 families, comprising over 7000 persons, were rendered homeless.
- In August 2014, at least 10 Tribal villagers lost their lives and several were injured near Uriamghat and Morangi in the district of Golaghat due to alleged attacks by armed Naga miscreants supported by NSCN militants. At least 10,000 people were displaced, mostly Adivasis, following the attacks in Morangi, Golaghat district. A border dispute between Assam and Nagaland is cited as one of the reasons for the attack.
- During the December 2014 Assam violence, many innocent Adivasi villagers lost their lives to militant attacks by NDFB(S). It all started on 21 December 2014, when two NDFB(S) cadre were killed in an encounter with security personnel. In retaliation, on 23 December 2014, 65 Tribal Adivasi villagers lost their lives in the simultaneous attacks by NDFB(S) militants armed with AK 47/56 series weapons in the three districts of Sonitpur, Kokrajhar and Chirang in one of the worst massacres in the history of Northeast India. Among the dead were 18 children and 21 women. In retaliation, the Adivasis killed three Bodos in a village near Behali in Sonitpur district and set fire to the houses of Bodos in Phuloguri village. Further, during the clash, another 14 were killed. The total death toll reached 85. Both communities burned houses and damaged properties at different parts of the state. The violence also spread to Udalguri district. Nearly 0.3 million people from both Adivasi and Bodo community got internally displaced due to retaliatory violence after the attacks. It led to widespread public protests across different parts of Assam in which again three tribal Adivasi protesters lost their lives in police firing in Dhekiajuli. Widespread condemnation happened across the nation against the massacre. As a result, the Indian Army launched "Operation All Out" to hunt down the NDFB(S) militants.
- At least 168 people, mostly tea workers, including women, died in the 2019 Assam alcohol poisonings, one of the worst hooch tragedies of India in the districts of Jorhat and Golaghat on 21–25 February 2019.
