= Sambalpuri culture =

Overview of the culture of Shambalpur region, Odisha (India)

Sambalpuri culture refers to the regional culture of the western districts of the Indian state of Odisha. These districts include Bargarh, Jharsuguda, Sambalpur, Sundergarh, Deogarh, Bolangir, Sonepur, Kalahandi, Nuapada, Boudh, and Athmallik sub-division of Angul. Sambalpur's cultural identity stems from the strong historical association between tribal and folk communities who have co-existed in western Odisha for centuries.

== Festivals ==
=== Dhanu Jatra ===
Dhanu Jatra (also "Dhanu Yatra") is an annual outdoor theatrical performance celebrated in Bargarh, Odisha. This 11-day event is recognized as the world's largest open-air theatre performance. The festival re-enacts the story of Krishna and his uncle Kansa's visit to Mathura to witness the Dhanu ceremony.

=== Sambalpur Lok Mahotsav ===
The Sambalpur Lok Mahotsav ("People's Festival") is a folk and tribal festival of culture celebrated in the Sambalpur region. It is organized by the local community in participating districts and celebrates the harmonious relationship between tribal and folk communities. It emphasizes the cultural identity and collective heritage of the region. Over time, it has grown to become one of the most highly attended festivals in the region.

Sambalpur Lok Mahotsav

=== Nuakhai ===
Nuakhai is a paddy harvest festival that takes place during August and September. Preparations begin at least 15 days before the festival commences. The first grains of the paddy crop are cooked into various dishes and offered to deities. The eldest member of the family then distributes these sacred offerings to younger members, who in turn seek the blessings of their elders for a happy and peaceful life.

=== Pousha Purnima ===
Pousha Purnima, also known as Puspuni, is an annual festival observed by the people of western and southern Odisha. It is held on the puni ("full moon") day of the month of Pusa (Sanskrit: Pausha). Rooted in the region's agrarian culture, the festival is an occasion for farming families to celebrate the annual paddy harvest. Other community members also participate, and over time, it has evolved into a significant community tradition.

=== Sitalsasthi ===
Sitalsasthi is the most celebrated festival in western Odisha, especially Sambalpur. The festival is a multi-day celebration of the divine marriage of Shiva and Parvati. The old areas of Sambalpur, such as Jharuapada, Nandpada, and Kansaripada, attract a significant number of visitors due to their traditional Sitalsasthi celebrations.

=== Bhai-juntia ===
Another festival, Bhai-juntia festival is celebrated on the Mahastami ("eighth day") of Durga Puja. It is a ritual fasting undertaken by women for the whole day and night to seek Durga's blessing for the long life of their brothers, as believed in their culture.

=== Pua-juntia ===
This is a ritual fasting puja of similar austerity for women. The Pua-juntia festival is observed by mothers to invoke the grace of Dutibahana for the long life and prosperity of their sons.

=== Shiva Ratri ===
Shiva Ratri Mela or Maha Shivaratri attracts large numbers of devotees to Sambalpur. This festival name translates to "Night of Shiva", referring to the practice of worship of Shiva. It is observed on Shiva Chaturdashi, which takes place on the fourteenth day of the dark half of Falgun. Participants perform various forms of worship, including meditation, reading, and chanting throughout the night. This festival may align with other astronomically significant events.

=== Others ===
Besides the above-listed festivals, other religious festivals observed include Dola Jatra, Durga Puja, Janmastami, Dipavali, Ganesh Puja, and Saraswati Puja.

== Music ==
Acoustic instruments used in the folk music of western Odisha hold cultural significance due to their rarity and unique contribution to the region's musical heritage. These instruments play a central role in preserving and presenting the distinctive folk styles of the area.

One prominent example is the Dulduli music ensemble, a traditional orchestra that combines several key instruments such as the dhol, nisan, tasha, jhanj, and muhuri. In this arrangement, the dhol serves as the primary rhythm instrument, the nisan adds bass elements, the tasha enhances treble tones, the jhanj provides additional percussion, and the muhuri, a wind instrument similar to the shehnai, functions as the primary melody-producing instrument.

== Dance ==
In Sambalpuri culture, community dances are connected to a function or to the worship of a deity.

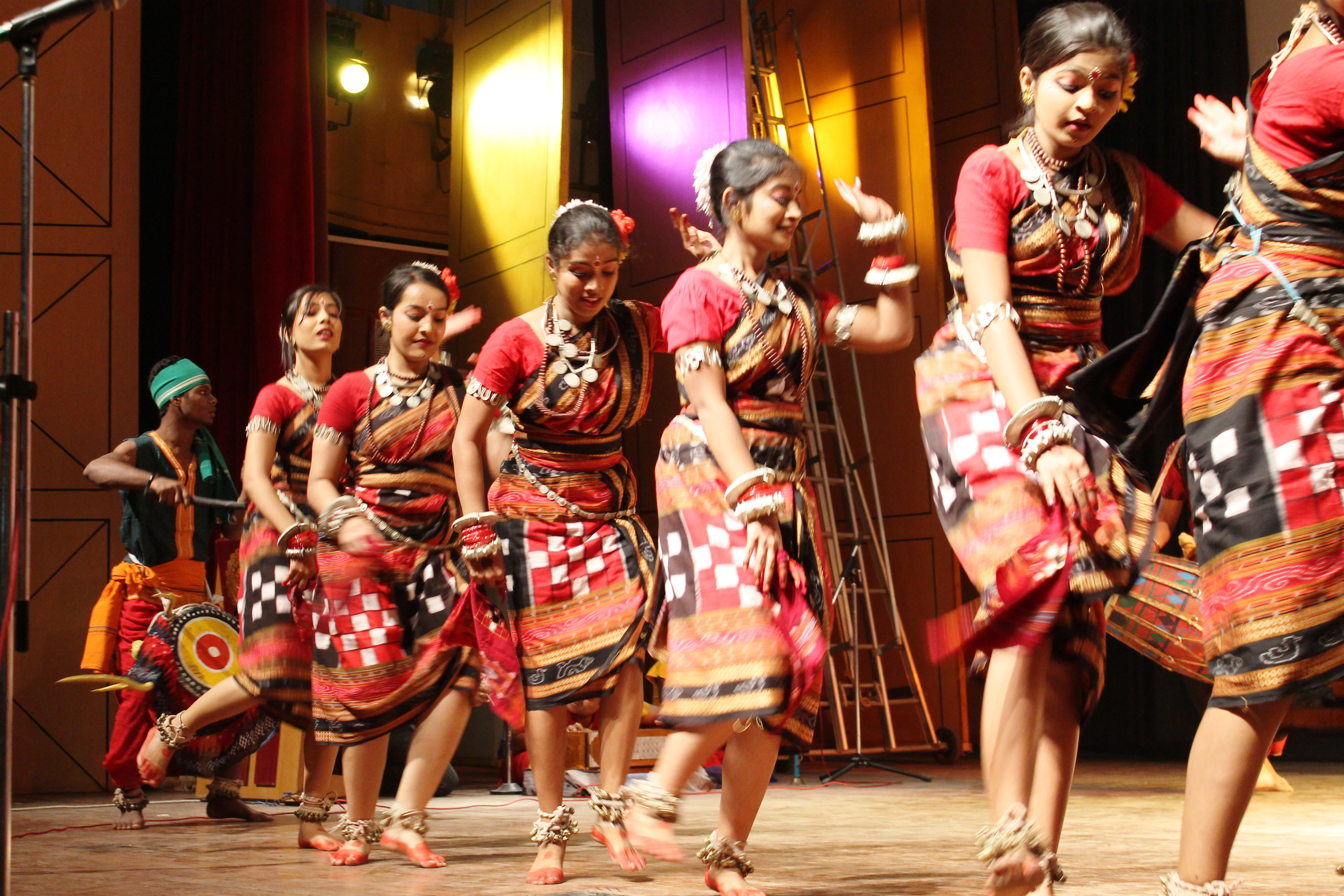
Sambalpuri Dance

Dalkhai dance

Dalkhai is a ritual folk dance. Songs sung on this occasion are known as Dalkhai songs. Young girls from the Binjhal, Soura, and Mirdha tribes perform this dance during Dusshera, Bhaijuntia, and other festive occasions. Non-tribal people also participate in these ritual dances and songs. Young girls stand in a line or a semi-circular pattern while dancing.

Karma dance

Karma is the most colourful dance of the district. It is mainly a tribal dance in honour of "Karam Sani", the deity they believe grants children. Non-tribal people also participate in this ritual dance and songs. In the beginning, dancers enter the arena in two rows. The drummers and the singers accompany with rhythmic steps.

Humo and Bauli

These are two playful dances performed generally by young and unmarried girls on special occasions, who sing and dance in groups. The steps and movements of the dance are very slow. However, older women of the villages also play a guiding role during the performance of these songs.

Koisabadi dance

This dance is prevalent among the Gond and the Bhuyan tribes. Male dancers take part, holding 2–3-foot-long sticks. The songs are mainly based on the love story of Radha and Krishna.

== Notable people ==
Bhima Bhoi

A list of people who have contributed to the growth of Sambalpuri culture and Odia language is given below.

=== Veer Surendra Sai ===
Veer Surendra Sai was born on 23 January 1809 in Khinda village in the Chauhan dynasty. Surendra Sai led a revolution against the British, assembling thousands of protesters. He was arrested by the then British government and died on 28 February 1884. Known as the "Lion of Sambalpur", Surendra Sai is remembered for his patriotism and dedication to the cause.

=== Gangadhar Meher ===
Gangadhar Meher was born on 9 August 1862 in Barpali, Bargarh district (undivided Sambalpur District) to a weaver family. He was educated up to the 5th grade. His writing and poetry is well regarded and cover themes of devotion, patriotism, reform, ethics, agriculture, elegies, and narration of nature. He died on 4 April 1924.

=== Bhima Bhoi ===
Bhima Bhoi was a 19th-century saint, Odia poet, mystic, and social reformer from the state of Odisha in India. Bhoi was a bhakta (Odia: devotee) of Mahima Gosain, the founder of Satya Mahima Dharma, an Indian religious tradition that challenged the authority of caste and other forms of discrimination. Bhoi is remembered for his mystical poetry, which was primarily in the Odia language, and his social reform efforts aimed at uplifting marginalized sections of society.

=== Chandra Sekhar Behera ===
Chandra Sekhar Behera of Sambalpur was a freedom fighter and a participant in the Non-Cooperation Movement. He consolidated the freedom movement in the Sambalpur region and merged his activities with the Indian National Congress. He was a founding member of the National School of Sambalpur, started on the lines of Satyabadi Vana-Vidyalaya, founded by Gopabandhu Das. As the chairman of the Sambalpur Municipality, he received Gandhi in Sambalpur in 1928. He organized a mass movement against illiteracy and untouchability and was instrumental in the activities of Utkal Sammilani in the formation of a separate state for Orissa. Chandra Sekhar died on 23 January 1936.

=== Satya Narayana Bohidar ===
Satya Narayan Bohidar was born on 1 August 1913 at Sonepur, and is known as a pioneer of Sambalpuri language and grammar. One of Bohidar's major contributions was a dictionary and grammar of the Sambalpuri language. He died on 31 December 1980.

=== Jadunath Supakar ===
Jadunath Supakar was born on 10 February 1931 to an artisan's family in Sambalpur. He was educated at National Arts School of Shantiniketan. Starting as a portrait artist, Jadunath earned his name as a master of handicraft and worked toward reviving the forgotten art of traditional weaving. He was engaged in a weavers' service center, established for artisans' development. Jadunath was also known for his mastery of musical instruments.

=== Isaac Santra ===
Isaac Santra was born in 1892 at Sambalpur. He was a doctor dedicated to the eradication of leprosy. He established a leper home at Hatibari. Santra was honoured by the Government of India with the Padma Shri award. He also edited a magazine, Prabhatee, propounding human values and qualities. He died on 29 August 1968.

=== Laxmi Narayan Mishra ===
Laxmi Narayan Mishra, born in 1906, was a freedom fighter in the Indian independence movement, for which he was imprisoned for seventeen years. In prison, he educated himself on religion, culture, and political thought. He was an expert in languages like Odia, Sanskrit, Urdu, Bengali, Telugu, Hindi and English, and hwas known as an extraordinary orator. He was assassinated during a train journey at Jharsuguda.

=== Radhashyam Meher ===
Radhashyam Meher was born on 20 November 1909 in Sambalpur. Meher invented the first handloom to weave textiles of ninety inches width, leading to the creation of the Sambalpuri sari. He is known as the father of Sambalpuri textiles, and heralded the era of Baandha art. He participated in the Indian independence movement and was jailed during the Quit India Movement. He died 19 May 1961.

=== Haldhar Nag ===
Dr. Haldhar Nag (born 31 March 1950) is a Sambalpuri poet and writer from Bargarh, Odisha, India. Popularly known as "lok kabi ratna" (meaning "people's poet gem"). He was awarded the Padma Shri by the Government of India in 2016. He has been compared to Gangadhar Meher for his Sambalpuri style of writing. The BBC made a documentary film about his life and works.

One of his first poems was Dhodo Bargachh (The Old Banyan Tree), which he published in a local magazine. The poem was successful, and four more published poems followed soon.

=== Jitendra Haripal ===
Jitendra Haripal is a singer regarded as an exponent of Sambalpuri language music. He received the Padma Shri from the Government of India in 2017 for his contribution to Indian music.

=== Aparajita Mohanty ===
Aparajita Mohanty (born 31 January 1962) is an Indian actress who mostly appears in Odia film industry. Apart from film, she has played various roles in Odia television serials.

== See also ==
- Kosli cinema
