= Kisan =

Kisan may refer to:

- Kisan people, a tribal people of India
- Kisan language (disambiguation), several languages
- Kisan (caste), a Hindu caste in India
- Kisan (film), 2006 Indian Malayalam-language film
- Kisaan, 2009 Indian film by Puneet Sira
- KISAN, Kus Indian Sut Asla Nicaragua ra (Nicaraguan Coast Indian Unity)
- Kisan (Palestine), a Palestinian village in the Bethlehem Governorate
- Kišan (1786–1854), Qing Chinese official
