= Hirlipali =

- Village
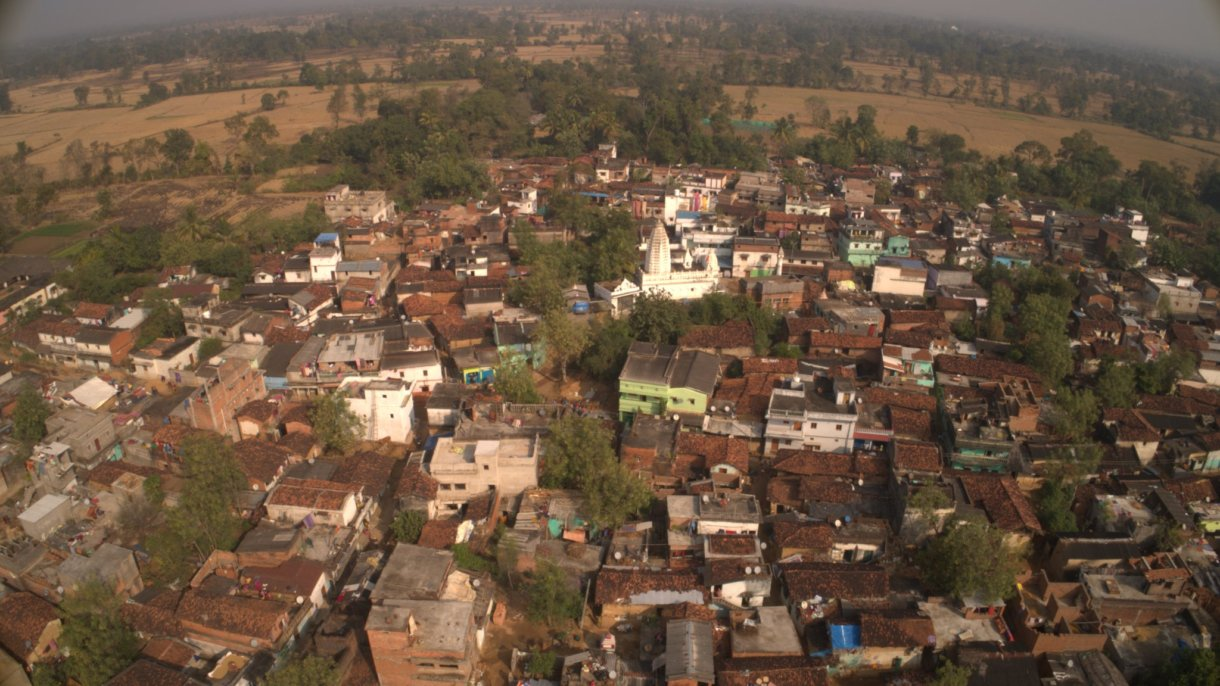
- Aerial photograph of Hirlipali

- Location in Odisha, India Hirlipali (India)
- Coordinates: 21°24′53″N 83°45′12″E
- Country: India
- State: Odisha
- District: Bargarh district
- Tehsil: Attabira

Government
  - Member of Parliament: Suresh Pujari, (BJP)
  - Member of Legislative Assembly: Snehangini Chhuria, (BJD)

Area
  - Total: 25.19 km^{2} (9.73 sq mi)
- Elevation: 164 m (538 ft)

Population (2001)
  - Total: 8,320

Languages
  - Official: Odia, English
  - Spoken: Sambalpuri
- Time zone: UTC+5:30 (IST)
- PIN: 768027
- Vehicle registration: OD-17

Hirlipali is a village in Attabira Tehsil of Bargarh district of Odisha, India. The village is located on the banks of canal that flows reservoir water from Hirakud Dam. It is about 10 km from Attabira and about 20 km from Bargarh town. The total geographical area of Hirlipali Gram Panchayat is 25.19 square kilometers, and has a total population of 8,320. There are approximately 1,817 households in the Gram Panchayat.

== Culture ==
Hiripali village is renowned for its rich cultural heritage. Almost all residents belong to the Hindu religion and actively participate in various Hindu festivals. The village features three prominent temples: Jagannath Mandir, Maa Hiripali Temple, and Hanuman Temple.

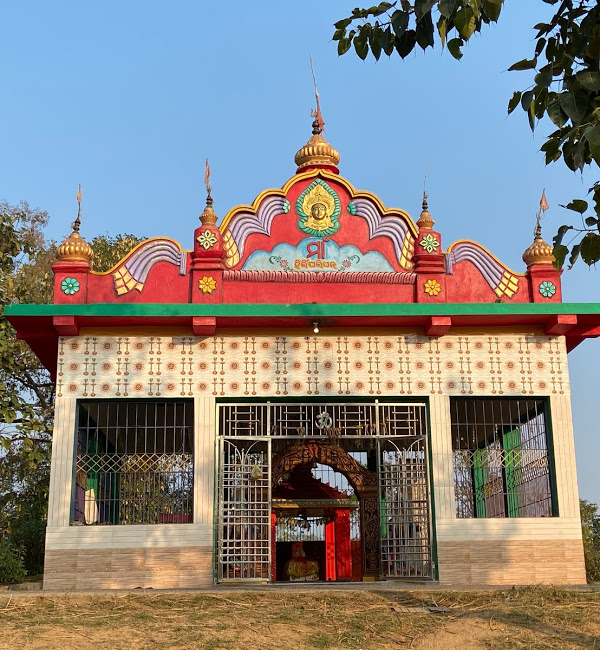
Maa Hirlipalian Temple

=== Maa Hirlipalian Temple ===
Hirlipali is named after Hirlipalian Devi. It is believed that the Devi resided in the village in ancient past. Hirlipalian Devi is quite popular in the region and is worshiped not only in Hirlipali but also in neighboring villages. A Maa Hirlipalian Temple is constructed in the village.

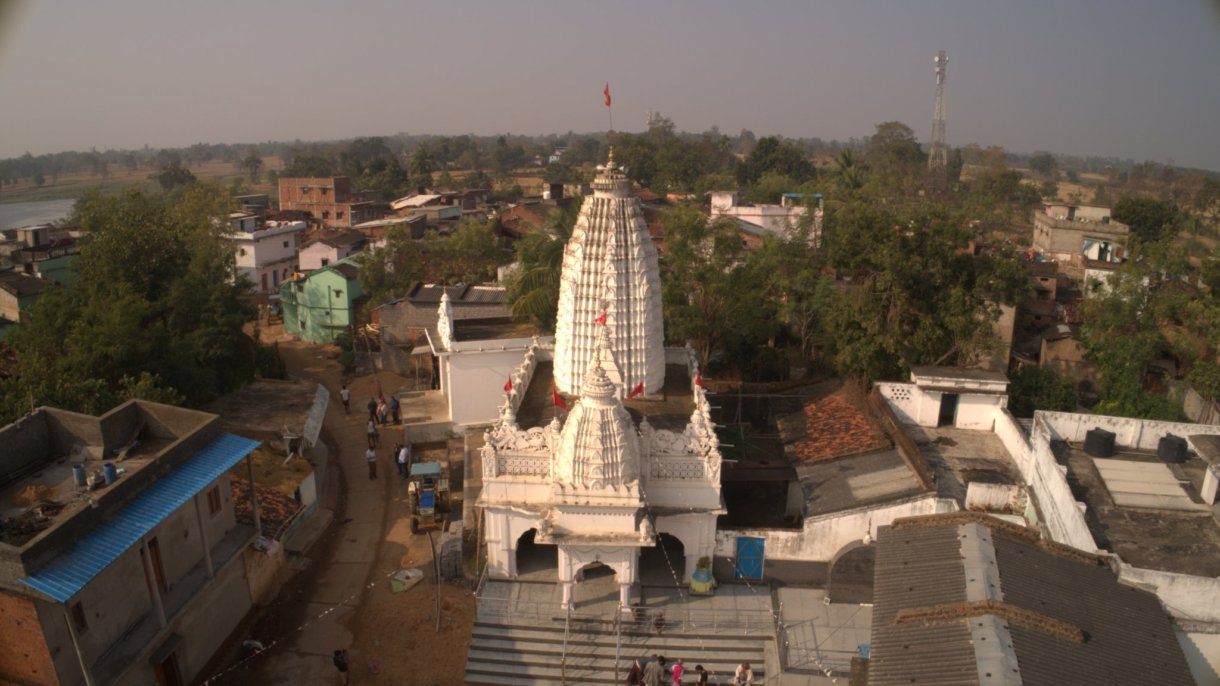
Jagannath Mandir, Hirlipali

=== Jagannath Mandir ===
Jagannath Mandir is located in the centre of the village. The construction of the village started in 1930s but it was not completed until 1970s when it was inaugurated. The delay in construction was because of lack of funds available for its construction. It was constructed using donation from the villagers. Every year, a ratha (cart) is built to take Lord Jagannath from the temple to Kathadera during Ratha Yatra festival. Along with a ratha from Hirlipali, there are five more rathas (carts) from neighboring villages that gets gathered in Kathadera for cart festival. Ratha Yatra is very popular in the village and is celebrated by all sections of the village.

Nuakhai, Pushpuni and Ratha Yatra are three major festivals that are celebrated in the village.

Residents of the village actively participates in kirtan., nataka, and daskathia. Kirtan, a devotional form of worshiping Lord Krishna is performed in Hirlipali every year for seven straight days during Rama Navami. It is believed that Kirtan was first performed in the village in 1950s and has been a regular ritual since then.

Nataka, a form of open theatre is very popular is the village. In the past, Hirlipali Nataka was invited by other villages to entertain them.

== Politics ==
Hirlipali was under a Gauntia and panchayat system before the independence of India from British rule. The last Gauntia was Bipin Bihari Pradhan. He was an officer of the British Government, and was responsible for collecting revenue for them. Gauntia is regarded as the legal head of a village. After India's independence, Bipin Bihari Pradhan unsuccessfully contested in the first legislative assembly election of Odisha as an independent candidate.

Hirlipali comes under the Attabira constituency for Odisha Legislative Assembly. On a national level, it comes under Bargarh constituency.

== Education ==
There are two schools in Hirlipali. They are Hirlipali Primary School and Hirlipali High School.

=== Hirlipali Primary School ===
Hirlipali Primary School (UDISE Code : 21010201306) was established in 1908. The medium of education is Odia and the school is managed by the Department of Education, Government of Odisha. The school provides education from grade 1 to 5. The school has 5 classrooms and 2 rooms for non-teaching activities. It has access to drinking water via hand pump. It has 1 boys and 1 girls toilet. It has a library with about 400 books in it.

=== Hirlipali High School ===
Hirlipali High School (UDISE Code: 21010201304) was established in 1986. The medium of education is Odia and the school is managed by private aided. The school provides education from grade 8 to 10. It has access to drinking water via hand pump. It has 1 boys and 1 girls toilet. It has a library with about 900 books in it. There was a Middle English (ME) School, which was established in 1961 and provided education for grade 6 and 7. The ME School was then converted to High School.

The land for both schools was donated by Hirlipali's Gauntia, Bipin Bihari Pradhan.

== Employment ==
The primary source of employment is agriculture. The land is very fertile and can be cultivated 3-4 times a year. Rice is the dominant crop, while vegetables such as tomatoes, lime, mangoes, potato, okra, pointed gourd, and herbs are also cultivated.

Sambalpuri handloom is a source of employment for some. Although, handloom business has been struggling to compete with synthetic textiles.

== Transport ==
=== Highway ===
Canal road is the primary route that connects Hirlipali with the National Highway 53, which is about 6 km away. The canal road (also known as Pahar - Sidga Rd or Rengali Camp Rd) was developed during the construction of canal in late 1950s. The canal flows water for agricultural purpose from Hirakud dam and was constructed in 1950s. The canal road is about 10–15 foot wide and was made of gravels. Prior to canal road, these was a mud road that was used to transport groceries from Bargarh using bullock carts. The canal road was converted to a concrete road in 2010s. There are a few buses that runs on this route.

=== Railway Station ===
The nearest railway station is Attabira Railway Station, which is about 10 km away.

=== Airport ===
The nearest airport is Veer Surendra Sai Airport, which is about 90 km away. The second nearest airport is Swami Vivekananda Airport at Raipur, Chhattisgarh, which is about 240 km away. Biju Patnaik International Airport, Bhubaneswar is about 310 km away.

== Post office ==
Hirlipali Post Office was established in 1950s. It is now a branch office and is funded by the Government of India. It falls under Sambalpur postal division of the Odisha postal circle.

== Hospital ==
The nearest hospital is in Paharsrigida, which is about 4 km away. There are a few medical stores in and around Hirlipali.

== Photo and video gallery ==
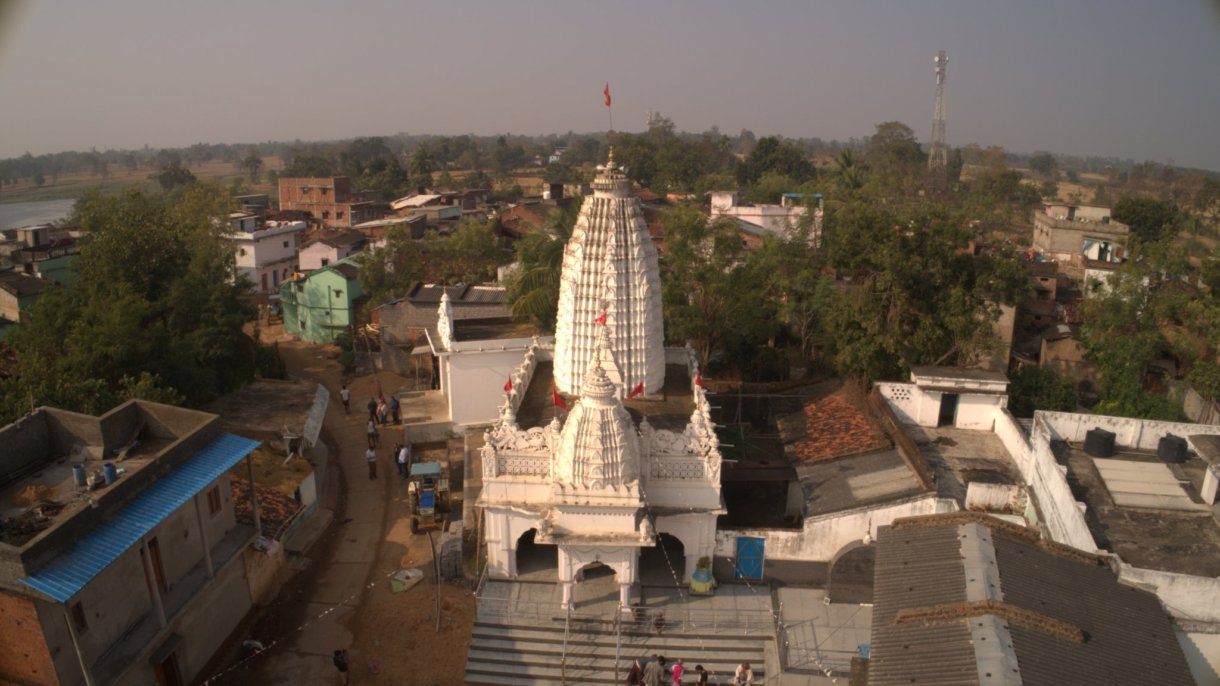
Jagannath Temple of Hirlipali

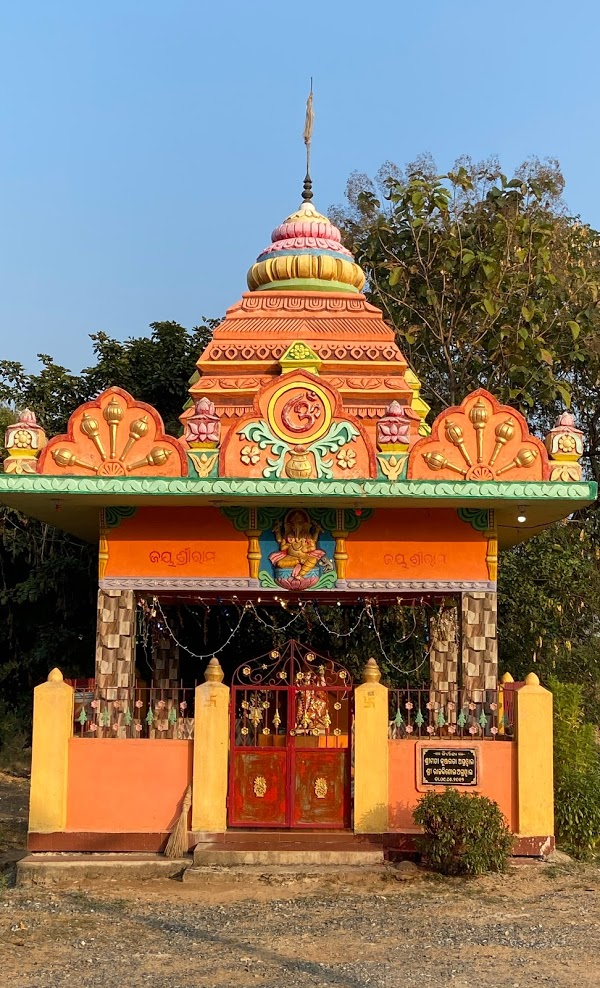
Hanuman Temple of Hirlipali

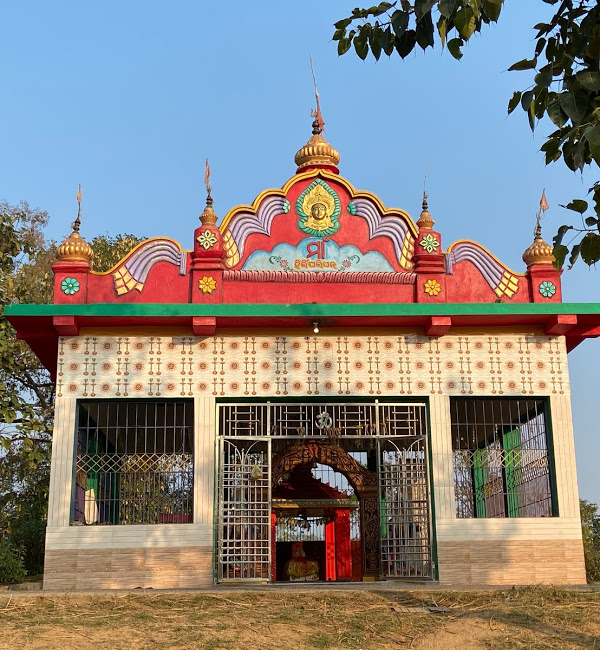
Maa Hirlipali Temple
