= Chhatabar =

Village in Sambalpur district, Odisha, India

Coordinates: 21.385°N 83.997°E

Chhatabar is a village in the Sambalpur district of Odisha, India. (There is another village called Chhatabar in Jatani block, Khordha district, Odisha).

== Geography ==
The village is located on the side of the Mahanadi, on the way to Sonepur, 15 km from district headquarters Sambalpur. It is surrounded by hills.

== Culture ==
Temples include:

- Jaganath Temple
- Ram Temple
- Hanuman Temple
- Samleswari Temple
- Gramdevi (demul, or sacred grove)

Nuakhai is the major festival. Every year Naam is held, conducted in the worship of Sriram for 7 days.

== Education ==
Chhatabar has a primary school, the Government Up School, Chhatabar, established in 1910 during British rule, a high school named Gour Charana Bidyapitha, Chhatabar, established in 1983, and a college named Bauri Bandhu Mahabidyalaya.
