= Hatibari railway station =

Railway station in Odisha

Hatibari

General information
- Location: Nuamahulpali, Hatibari, Sambalpur district, Odisha; India
- Coordinates: 21°18′34″N 84°07′05″E
- Elevation: 189 metres (620 ft)
- System: Indian Railways station
- Owner: Indian Railways
- Line: Cuttack–Sambalpur line
- Platforms: 1
- Tracks: 2

Construction
- Structure type: Standard (on ground)
- Parking: Yes

Other information
- Status: Functioning
- Station code: HATB
- Zone(s): East Coast Railway
- Division(s): Sambalpur

History
- Opened: 1998

Services
Preceding station	Indian Railways	Following station
Maneswar towards ?	East Coast Railway zone Cuttack–Sambalpur line	Jujumura towards ?
Location
- Location within India Location within Odisha

Hatibari railway station is a railway station on Cuttack–Sambalpur line under the Sambalpur railway division of the East Coast Railway zone. The railway station is situated at Nuamahulpali, Hatibari in Sambalpur district of the Indian state of Odisha.
