= Sambalpuri =

Sambalpuri may refer to:

- Something of, from, or related to:
  - Sambalpur, a city in India
  - Sambalpur district
- Sambalpuri language

== See also ==
- Sambalpuri saree
- Sambalpuri cinema
- Sambalpuri culture
