= Maneswar railway station =

Railway station in Odisha

Maneswar

General information
- Location: Halipali, Maneswar, Sambalpur district, Odisha; India
- Coordinates: 21°24′41″N 84°02′38″E
- Elevation: 158 metres (518 ft)
- System: Indian Railways station
- Owner: Indian Railways
- Line: Cuttack–Sambalpur line
- Platforms: 1
- Tracks: 2

Construction
- Structure type: Standard (on ground)
- Parking: Yes

Other information
- Status: Functioning
- Station code: MANE
- Zone(s): East Coast Railway
- Division(s): Sambalpur

History
- Opened: 1998

Services
Preceding station	Indian Railways	Following station
Sambalpur City towards ?	East Coast Railway zone Cuttack–Sambalpur line	Hatibari towards ?
Location
- Location within India Location within Odisha

Maneswar railway station is a railway station on Cuttack–Sambalpur line under the Sambalpur railway division of the East Coast Railway zone. The railway station is situated at Halipali, Maneswar in Sambalpur district of the Indian state of Odisha.
