= Maneswar =

Coordinates: 21.421354°N 84.029851°E

Maneswar is a town in Sambalpur district, Odisha, India, situated 15 kilometres (9.3 mi) from Sambalpur. The postal code of Maneswar 768005. Nearby villages of this town are Sindurpank (3.6 km), Jhankarpali (4.2 km), Gunderpur (4.2 km), Kabrapali (7.3 km), Batemura (7.8 km), chhatabar (6.0 km) Ghenupali (8.0 km). Naxapali

There is a temple dedicated to Shiva on the banks of the Malti Jore at Maneswar. The Maneswar High School is located on Dhama road.
