= Dalkhai =

Type of dance

Dalkhai is a popular folk dance of the Adivasis of Odisha, India.

== Etymology ==
The dance originates in the western Odisha. The name is derived from dancers shouting ‘Dalkhai Bo!’ at the beginning and end of each stanza sung in the dance.

== Description ==
The dance normally corresponds to the Hindu epics such as the love story of Radha and Krishna.

It is performed in various festivals such as Bhaijiuntia, Phagun Puni and Nuakhai. The dance is popular among the Binjhal, Kuda, Mirdha, Sama and other tribes of Western Odisha. Male dancers address their female counterparts during the performance and flirt with them.

The dance is accompanied by a rich orchestra of folk music played by a number of instruments known as dhol, nisan (typically a giant drum made of iron case), tamki (a tiny one sided drum 6" in diameter played by two sticks), tasa (a one sided drum) and mahuri. The dhol player controls the tempo of the performance.

Women wear a colorful printed Sambalpuri saree. They also tie a scarf on their shoulders holding the ends in both the hands. Various traditional pieces of jewelry are worn by the performers to complete the look.
