= Pausha Purnima =

Auspicious day of Hindu

- Observed by: Hindus
- Type: Religious
- Significance: marks the beginning of the Magh Mela
- Observances: holy dip in sacred rivers, fasting, and acts of charity
- 2025 date: 13 January

Pausha Purnima is celebrated during the Pausha month of Hindu calendar. The specialty of this day is to take a dip in any holy water body. Some parts of India celebrate Pausha Purnima as Shakambhari Purnima.

Kumbh Mela traditionally begins on Pausha Purnima and continues until the end of Maha Shivaratri.

== Significance ==
Pausha Purnima day in Hindu religion is considered auspicious to get blessings from Sun and Moon God after performing special prayers and rituals. The auspicious day falling in the month of Pausha which is dedicated to Sun God and combined with the Pausha month which is known for spiritual significance coupled with rejuvenation practices.

== Legend ==
Pausha Purnima is also associated with and ancient story called Pausha Purnima Vrata Katha.

== Rituals ==
On Pausha Purnima day people perform the following rituals-

- Waking up early morning and taking a holy bath.
- Visiting religious places like Haridwar or Prayagraj to take holy bath in river Ganga as its considered very important.
- Offering Argya to Surya (Sun God) along with chanting Surya Mantra after taking bath.
- Offering prayer to Vishnu after lighting Diya with Desi ghee.
- Offering Havan and donating food and clothes to Brahmins.
