= Kisan language =

Kisan may be:

- The Kisan dialect of the Kurux language
- The Kisan dialect of the Maithili language
- The Nepalese name of the Sadri language
