= Nawakhani =

Indian harvest festival

- Type: Regional Festival
- Significance: Harvest festival
- Observances: Jharkhand, Chhattisgarh, Odisha
- Date: September, October
- Frequency: Annual
- Related to: Nuakhai, Nabanna, Nawai

Nawakhani is harvest festival of Jharkhand, Chhattisgarh and Odisha. In this festival people eat new grain of rice after harvesting.

== Etymology ==
Nawakhani means eating new. Nawa means New and Khani means eat. It signifies eating new grain after harvest.

== Celebration ==
It is harvest festival of Chota Nagpur plateau region of Jharkhand, Chhattisgarh and Odisha. People fast, venerate Suraj (Sun) and ancestors by offering new grain. It is celebrated in courtyard. The head of the family sacrifice animals (especially chicken) to Sun and ancestors. Then cooked meat and Tapan (fermentated rice drinks) is distributed among family members. In this festival, people prepare bread, Chuda from new rice which grows in plain field called Godda dhan. It is observed to celebrate new grain eating after harvest.

It is celebrated by Sadan people of Jharkhand and Kurukh people.

== Observation in other parts of India ==
This festival is also celebrated in Chhattisgarh. In Western Odisha, it is known as Nuakhai. In Madhya Pradesh, it is known as Nawai celebrated among Bhils. New grain eating festival in West Bengal is known as Nabanna.
