= Pousha Purnima =

Annual festival in Odisha, India

- Also called: Puspuni
- Observed by: Odisha
- Begins: Pausha Shukla Purnima
- Ends: Pausha Purnima
- Related to: Paush Purnima

Pousha Purnima, also known as Puspuni, is an annual harvest festival observed in Odisha, India on the full moon (Puni) in the month of Pus (Sanskrit Pausha). The day is an opportunity for farmers to celebrate their annual harvest, and is accompanied by celebrations held by other communities, involving feasts, music and dance.

== Observance ==
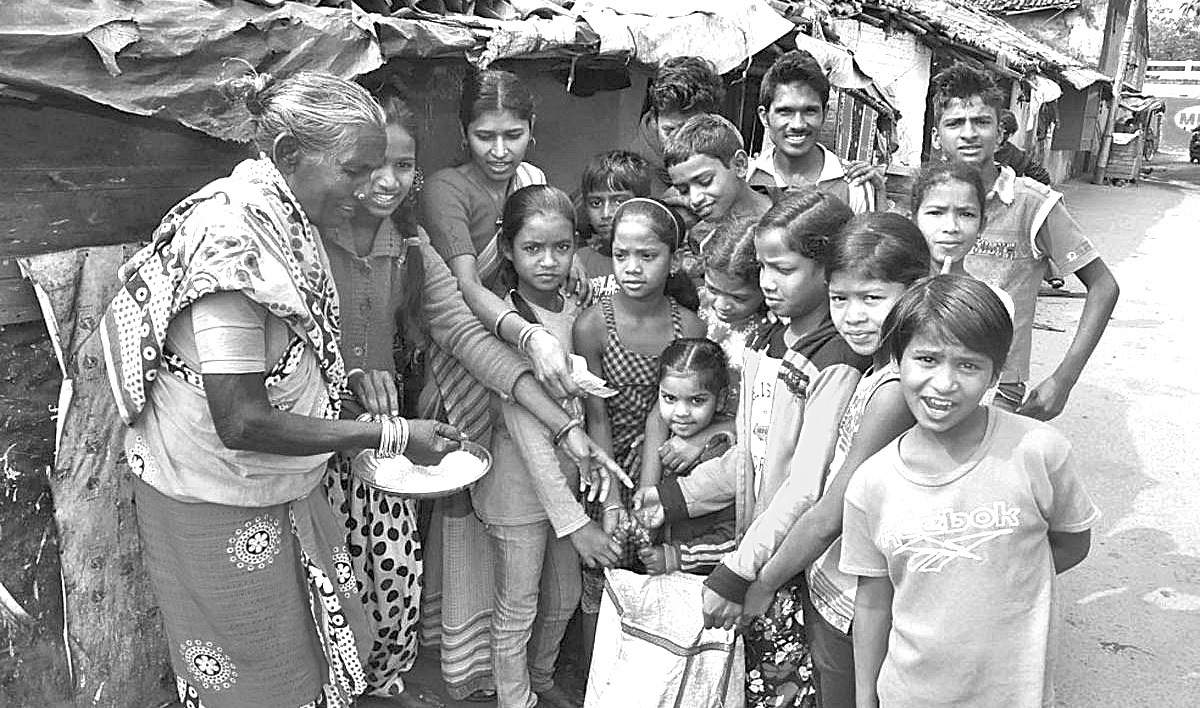
Cultural Festival where children travel with local songs asking for food grains called "ChherChhera". Local to Western Odisha.

Bargarh town, in Western Odisha observes Pousha a day later than elsewhere, reflecting beliefs on the deaths of mythical King of Dhanuyatra.

The farmers of Western Odisha grow rice on their agricultural land during monsoon and harvest in autumn. Pausha occurs after the harvest in celebration, and involves cooking dishes, especially goat meat, along with rice pudding and cakes. The food is eaten with family and friends. Some communities celebrate with Kusna (rice-liquor) and Mahuli. This feasting is associated with community playing, singing and dancing. In past, the male youth played Chhur, Gudu, and Gourbaadi. Some engage themselves in pastimes like Kukraamaar (cock-fight), Garraamaar (ram-fight) and the like. Likewise, the girls played Saatgaati or Kansaadi indoors and Humo-bauli outdoors.

A tradition known as chher-Chheraa ("grain for the birds") is also practiced, that involves leaving some produce unattended for wildlife. Grains for this are collected door-to-door by children. Some of what is collected is given to the unlanded poor.

During celebrations, farmers gives payment to labourers who had worked the harvest (Bhuti), including a bonus called Nistaar. The word nistaar means "freedom", and signifies the end of the contract.
