= Samleswari Temple =

Samaleswari Temple
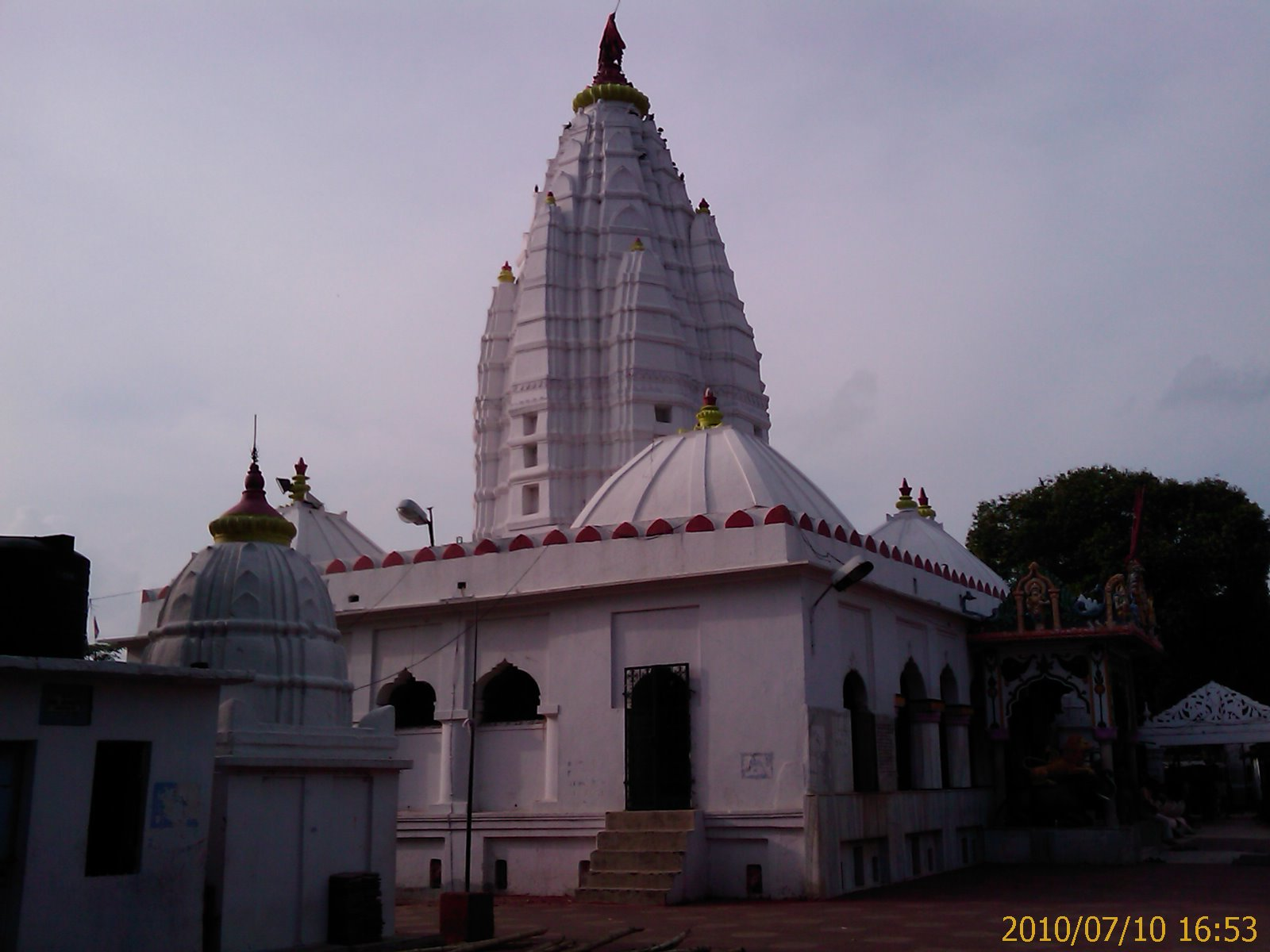
- Samaleswari Temple

- Location in Odisha

Religion
- Affiliation: Hinduism
- District: Sambalpur
- Deity: Goddess Samaleswari
- Festivals: Nuakhai, Navaratra Puja

Location
- Location: Sambalpur
- State: Odisha
- Country: India
- Interactive map of Samaleswari Temple
- Coordinates: 21.4740°N 83.9591°E

Architecture
- Type: Kalinga Architecture, Hindu Temple Architecture, Stone and Limestone
- Creator: King Balaram Dev
- Completed: 16th Century

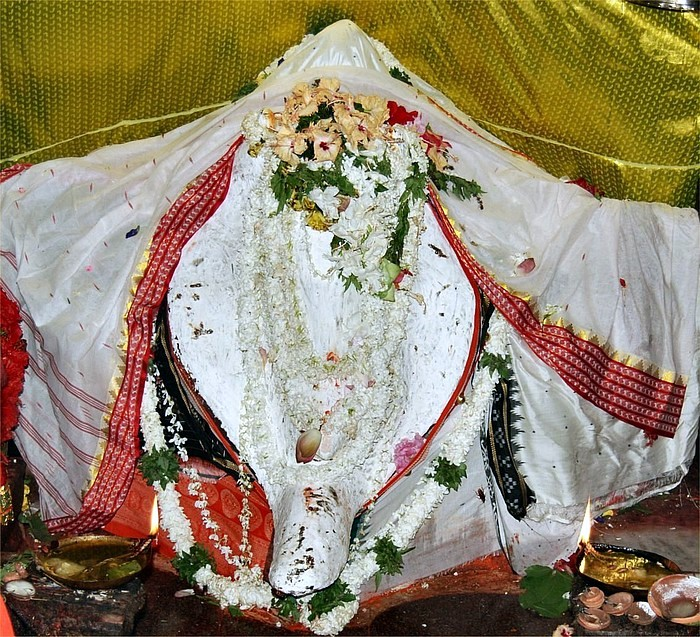
Maa Samaleswari in white attire.

Samaleswari Temple is a Hindu temple in Sambalpur, Odisha, India, dedicated to the goddess known as 'Samaleswari', also known among the natives as Samalei Maa, meaning Mother Samaleswari. Shree Shree Samaleswari, the revived presiding deity of Sambalpur, holds a profound religious significance across western Odisha and Chhattisgarh in India. Situated on the banks of the sacred Mahanadi River, Goddess Samaleswari has been worshipped since ancient times as Jagat Janani (Mother of the Universe), Durga, Mahalaxmi, Mahasaraswati, and Adishakti. After Lord Jagannath, she is the only deity in Odisha who presides over such a vast region, encompassing all of western Odisha, and extending into parts of Jharkhand and Chhattisgarh.

The region in which the temple is situated has a rich cultural heritage. Sambalpur region is popularly known as Hirakhanda from ancient times. Ptolemy has described the place as Sambalaka, according to French traveller Jean-Baptiste Tavernier and English historian Edward Gibbon, diamonds were exported to Rome from Sambalpur.

The temple is of Sandhara order (these types of the temples have a square sanctum enclosed by a gallery of pillars meant for pradakshina). Thus, the Sandhara temples have a Pradakshinapatha is built of a kind of stone as durable as granite, cemented with lime mortar, the whole building is plastered, but in the course of time the surface has become mouldy. The temple consists of two separate structures. The square sanctum enshrining the deity is four step below the 10-foot-wide (3.0 m) covered circumambulation, which is supported by 12 stone pillars. Eleven parswa devis (side Goddesses), are embedded on the outer wall of the sanctum, so that the devotees can worship those deities during parikrama through the vaulted circumambulation. The idol of Shree Shree Samalei Devi consists of a large block of granite rock with an inverted, trunk-like projection at the bottom. This also symbolises a yoni, and is an interesting kings-yoni worship. A shallow cut on her "Baraha" like face symbolises her mouth. Traditional Sambalpuri nose ornament of pure gold hangs down from her imaginary nose. Beaten gold leaves fixed on two disproportionate golden eye-like depressions on the face act as substitute for her eyes in an attempt to define the face of the mother deity on a mass of self shaped rock, the devi's idol inspires sublime sentiments of awe, fear, reverence, devotion, love and affection towards all-pervasive motherhood.

She is worshipped with great care and devotion by the natives in her temple, famously known as the Samaleswari temple. Among the varieties of festivals observed before the goddess throughout the year, three festivals are observed prominently. The first two are Navaratri pujas during the months of March and April and during the months of September and October (Chaitra Navaratri and Ashwin Navaratri respectively). The goddess is dressed differently on each day representing each of the Navadurgas, this is called Beeja. Among these two navaratra pujas (nine days continuous worship of the goddess), the second one is observed with great splendour and devotion. On the 1st day of the Navaratri, the goddess is dressed in white attire, called Dhabalamukhi. The third festival which is said to be the chief festival of the whole western Odisha region is Nuakhai. In this festival, the farmers offer the first produce from their lands to the goddess before using it for their personal use.
