= Kisan (caste) =

Regions with significant populations
- India

Languages
- Hindi

Religion
- Hinduism 100%

The Kisan are a Hindu caste found in the state of Uttar Pradesh in India. They basically belong to lodhi community in Uttar Pradesh . They have been granted Other Backward Class status.
