= Hatibari, Odisha =

Village in Odisha

Coordinates: 20°53′N 85°57′E

Hatibari is a village located in Nuagaon block of Sundargarh District, Odisha, India. Most of the people belong to scheduled tribes and scheduled castes. It is one of the important Gram panchayat of this locality. Hatibari Village is located near the border of Odisha-Jharkhand. Being the important village of ancient Kinjir Garh, it has an ancient building of royal family "Nana Shaheb", an old high school, Hatibari High School (now Govt. undertaking), a PHC, and a police station. Rourkela Steel Plant (RSP)'s Raw Material Division PL & DQ is near 6km of Hatibari. There is an abandoned quarry of Tata Steel (formerly Tata Iron and Steel Company Limited (TISCO)) near the village and also an abandoned aerodrome field.
