= Mirdha (tribe) =

The Mirdha (Kapu) people are an Indian Other Backward Class (OBC) group that live mostly in the states of Odisha, Tamil Nadu, Andhra Pradesh, karnatak, and Rajasthan. The 1981 census recorded a population of 28,177, mainly spread over the districts of Sambalpur, Bolangir and Kalahandi. They are considered to be the other backward classes offshoots of several other backward classes groups.
