= Nuakhai =

Festival in India

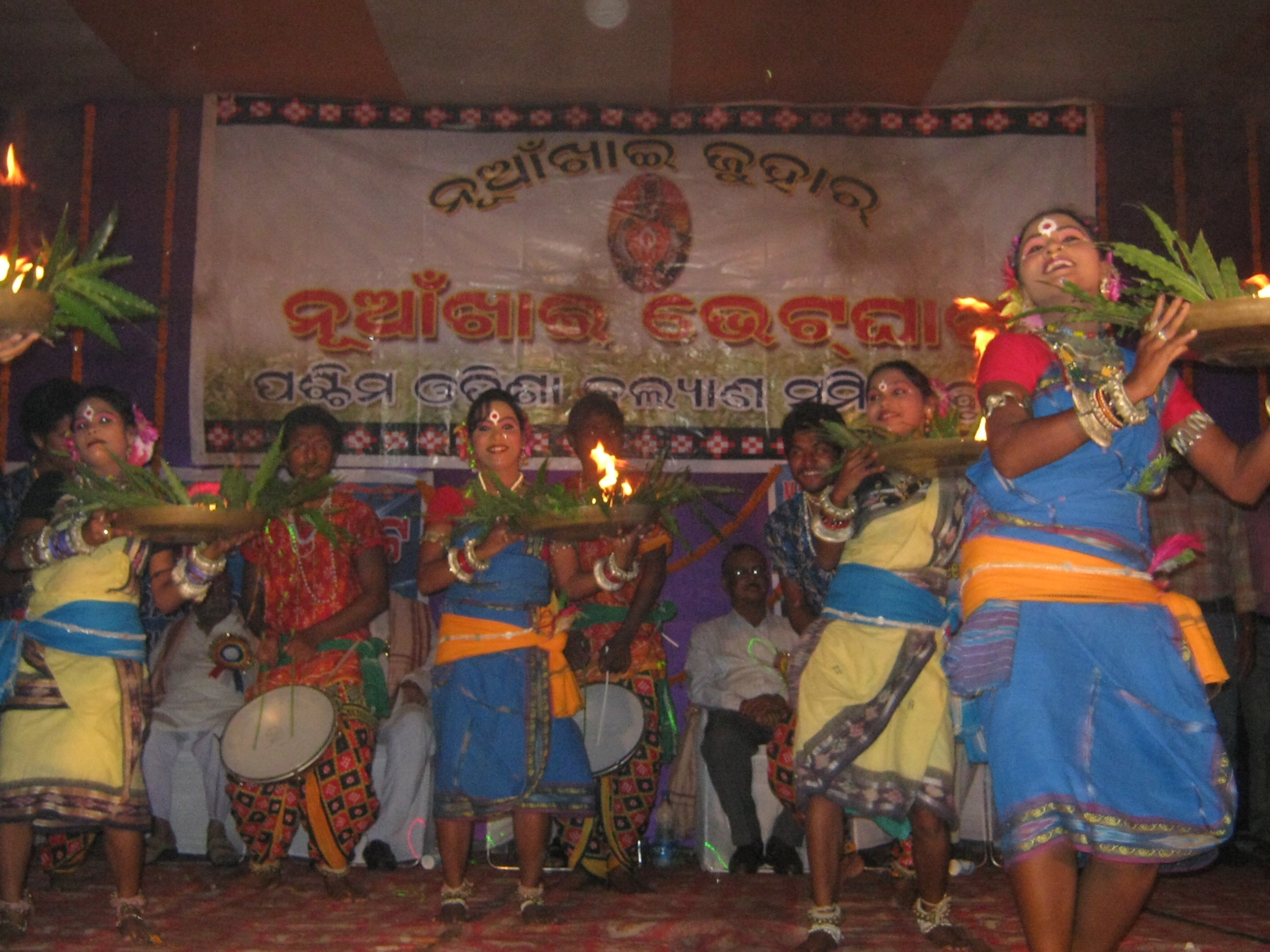
- The Nuakhai bhetghat performed by artists on the occasion of Nuakhai Juhar in Sambalpur
- Also called: Nabanna
- Type: Regional Festival/Indian festival
- Significance: Harvest festival
- Observances: Western Odisha
- Begins: Panchami tithi (fifth day) of lunar fortnight of Bhadrabaa
- Date: August–September
- Frequency: annual

Nuakhai is an agricultural festival mainly observed by people of Western Odisha in India. Nuakhai is observed to welcome the new rice of the season. According to the calendar it is observed on panchami tithi (the fifth day) of the lunar fortnight of the month of Bhadrapada or Bhadraba (August–September), the day after the Ganesh Chaturthi festival. This is the most important social festival of Western Odisha and Chhattishgarh also adjoining areas of Simdega in Jharkhand, where the culture of Western Odisha is much predominant.

== Description ==
Nuakhai is also called Nuakhai Parab or Nuakhai Bhetghat. It is also known as Navakhai Parv in Chhattisgarh. The word nua means new and khai means food, so the name means the farmers are in possession of the newly harvested rice. The festival is seen as a new ray of hope, held the day after the Ganesh Chaturthi festival. It has a big significance for farmers and the agricultural community. The festival celebrated at a particular time of day which is called lagan. Aersaa Pithaa is prepared to celebrate this festival. When the lagan comes, the people first remember their village god or goddess and then have their khai.

Nuakhai is the agricultural festival of people of Western Odisha. The festival is observed throughout Odisha, but it is particularly important in the life and culture of Western Odisha. It is a festival for the worship of food grain. It has its best celebration in the Kalahandi, Sambalpur, Balangir, Bargarh, Sundergarh, Jharsuguda, Subarnapur, Boudh and Nuapada districts of Odisha.

Nuakhai is a cohesive and unified force between people of the Western Odisha living in Delhi, as they unite and celebrate together the occasion of Nuakhai. People from the Odisha now living in Rajasthan Bangalore, Bhopal, Chennai, Hyderabad, Kolkata, Mumbai, Surat and Visakhapatnam have been celebrating Nuakhai in their new cities for the past few decades. The modern Nuakhai festival, now being observed on the fifth day of the second fortnight of Bhadrava, was unquestionably given a new look of homogeneity and uniformity by various social organizations of Western Odisha, including the government of Odisha in 1991. It has lost some of its enormity and variety with the passage of time, but Nuakhai is still an occasion which endorses the patrimonial nature of the Sambalpuri culture and society.

== History ==
According to local researchers Nuakhai is of fairly ancient origin. Some researchers found the fundamental idea of the celebration can be traced back at least to Vedic times when the rishis (sages) had talked of panchayajna, the five important activities in the annual calendar of an agrarian society. These five activities have been specified as sitayajna (the tilling of the land), pravapana yajna (the sowing of seeds), pralambana yajna (the initial cutting of crops), khala yajna (the harvesting of grains) and prayayana yajna (the preservation of the produce). In view of this, Nuakhai may be seen as having evolved out of the third activity, namely pralambana yajna, which involves cutting the first crop and reverently offering it to the mother goddess.

Although the origin of the festival has been lost over time, oral tradition dates its back to the 14th century AD, the time of the first Chauhan King Ramai Deva, founder of the Patna State which is currently part of Balangir district in Western Odisha. In his efforts to build an independent kingdom, Raja Ramai Deo realized the significance of settled agriculture because the subsistence economy of the people in the area was primarily based on hunting and food gathering. He realised this form of economy could not generate the surpluses required to maintain and sustain a state. During state formation in the Sambalpuri region, Nuakhai as a ritual festival played a major role in promoting agriculture as a way of life. Thus credit can be given to Raja Ramai Deo for making Nuakhai a symbol of Sambalpuri culture and heritage.

== Observation ==
In the early years, there was no fixed day for celebration of the festival. It was held sometime during Bhadraba Sukla Pakhya (the bright fortnight of Bhadraba). It was the time when the newly grown Kharif crop (autumn crop) of rice started ripening. There are reasons for observing the festival in the month of Bhadrava even though the food grain is not ready for harvesting. The thought is to present the grain to the presiding deity before any bird or animal pecks at it and before it is ready for eating.

In early traditions, farmers would celebrate Nuakhai on a day designated by the village headman and priest. Afterward, under the patronage of royal families, this simple festival was altered into a mass socio-religious event celebrated in the entire western Odisha region.

=== Deities ===
Every year, the tithi (day) and samaya (time) of observance was astrologically determined by the Hindu priests. Priests sat together at the Brahmapura Jagannath temple in Sambalpur and calculated the day and time. The tithi (date) and lagna (auspicious moment) were calculated in the name of Pataneswari Devi in the Balangir-Patnagarh area, in the name of Sureswari Devi in the Subarnapur area, and in the name of Manikeswari Devi in the Kalahandi area. In Sundargarh, Puja (worship) was first offered by the royal family to the goddess Sekharbasini in the temple which is opened only for Nuakhai. In Sambalpur, at the stipulated lagna (auspicious moment), the head priest of Samaleswari Temple offers the nua-anna or nabanna to the goddess Samaleswari, the presiding deity of Sambalpur.

=== Rituals ===
People in the Western Odisha region initiate preparations for the event 15 days in advance. Nuakhai is understood to have nine steps, and as a consequence, nine Step of rituals are followed as a prelude to the actual day of celebration. These nine step include:

1. Beheren (announcement of a meeting to set the date)
2. Lagna dekha (setting the exact date for partaking of new rice)
3. Daka haka (invitation)
4. Sapha sutura and lipa puchha (cleanliness)
5. Ghina bika (purchasing)
6. Nua dhan khuja (looking for the new crop)
7. Bali paka (final resolve for Nuakhai by taking the Prasad (the offering) to the deity)
8. Nuakhai (eating the new crop as Prasad after offering it to the deity, followed by dancing and singing)
9. Juhar bhet (respect to elders & gift transfers)

== Celebration ==
The preparations begin some 15 days prior to the date of the festival, when the elderly persons of the village sit together at a holy place after the beheren calls the villagers by blowing a trumpet. Then people get together and discuss with the priests the tithi and lagna (auspicious day and time) for Nuakhai. The priest consults the panjika (astrological almanac) and announces the sacred muhurta (a period of time equal to about 48 minutes) when nua is to be taken.

There was an attempt made during the 1960s to set a common tithi for the Nuakhai festival all over the western Odisha . It was decided this was not a workable idea. The idea was reintroduced in 1991 to set the Bhadraba Sukla Panchami tithi for the Nuakhai festival. This became successful and since then, the festival has been celebrated on that day, and the Odisha State Government has declared it an official holiday. Although for the sake of convenience a common auspicious day is set for Nuakhai, the sanctity of the ritual has not lost its importance. Today, however, the system of setting the tithi and lagna and calling elderly persons for a consensus does not happen in urban areas.

Nuakhai is celebrated both at the community and domestic level. The rituals are first observed at the temple of the reigning deity of the area or to the village deity. Afterward, the people worship in their respective homes and offer rituals to their domestic deity and to Lakshmi, the deity of wealth in the Hindu tradition. People wear new clothes for the occasion. It is a tradition that after offering the nua to the presiding deity, the eldest member of the family distributes nua to other members of the family. After taking the nua, all the junior members of the family offer their regards to their elders. Thereafter follows the nuakhai juhar, which is the exchange of greetings with friends, well-wishers, and relatives. This symbolizes unity. This is an occasion for people to lay their differences to rest and start relationships afresh. Towards the evening people meet one another, exchanging greetings. All differences are discarded and elders are wished nuakhai juhar. The elders bless their juniors and wish them long life, happiness, and prosperity. Even the partitioned brothers celebrate the festival under one roof. In the evening, folk dances and songs are organized called "Nuakhai Bhetghat". People dance to the foot tapping traditional Sambalpuri dance forms like Rasarkeli, Dalkhai, Maelajada, Chutkuchuta, Sajani, Nachnia, and Bajnia.

== Related festivals ==
According to Singh, evidence can be found of the Nuakhai festival been observed by nearly all the major tribes in central and eastern India, with a minor difference in nomenclature. Jeth Nawakhai is celebrated among the Dudh Kharia and Pahari Kharia, Nawakhani amongst the Oraon and Birjia, Jom Nawa among the Munda and Birjia, Janther or Baihar-Horo Nawai by the Santal, Gondli Nawakhani by the tribal people of Ranchi district, Nawa by the Birjia, Nawa-Jom by the Birhor, Dhan Nawakhani by Korwa, and so on. Russel and Hiralal have mentioned the Nawakhani festival of the Paraja, a small tribe found in the Bastar region and Odisha. Gautam (1977) observed a new corn offering and rice eating festival of the Santals in Santal Pargana which they term Jom Nawa. Das Gupta (1978) has noted the Nawa ceremony of the Birjia, a section of the Asura tribe of Chhotanagpur. Bhaduri (1944:149-50) presents a short note on the celebration of a festival of the Tripura known as Mikatal where Mi stands for rice and Katal means new. It is celebrated in the month of Aswina (September–October). In the coastal districts of Odisha, the festival is called Nabanna. Regardless of the name, the main objective of this festival is to get social sanction for the new crop, and to invoke the deities to bless the land with abundant crops.
