= Sonepur =

Sonepur or Sonapur may refer to:

India

- Sonapur, Alipurduar, village in West Bengal, India
- Sonapur, Assam, town
  - Sonapur College
- Sonapur, Bhandup, urban area of Mumbai, Maharashtra, India
- Sonpur, Bihar, town in Bihar, India
  - Sonpur community development block
  - Sonpur (Vidhan Sabha constituency)
  - Sonepur Cattle Fair
  - Sonpur railway division
    - Sonpur Junction railway station
- Sonepur or Subarnapur, Odisha, town in Odisha, India
  - Subarnapur district, district in Odisha, India
  - Sonepur (Odisha Vidhan Sabha constituency), assembly constituency of Odisha, India
  - Sonepur State, former princely state of British India
  - Sonepuri, related to or from Sonepur, Odisha, India
    - Sonepuri handloom, a type of Indian sari
- Sonapur, Manipur, village
- Sonapur College, Noakhali, West Bengal, India
- Sonpura, village in Gujarat, India
- Sonipur, village in Gandhinagar district, Gujarat, India

Nepal

- Sonapur, Kosi
- Sonapur, Bheri
- Sonapur, Jhapa
- Sonpur, Nepal

Others

- Sonapur, Dubai
- Sonapur, a fictional location in the 2012 Indian animated feature Chhota Bheem and the Curse of Damyaan

== See also ==
- Subarnapur (disambiguation)
