= Shashisena Kavya =

17th century book written by Pratap Rai

Shashisena Kāvya, also Śaśisēṇā or Sasisena (Hindi: शशिसेणा, romanized: śaśisēṇā, Odia: ଶଶିସେଣା, romanized: śåśisēṇā), is a literary book written by Pratap Rai in the 17th century. It is considered as one of the landmark books in the Odia literature.

== Synopsis of the book ==
The book is mainly based on the love between Ahimanikya, the son of a Dewan (Mantriputra Ahimanikya), and Sasisena, a princess (Rajputra Shashisena). It also depicts the tantric and shakti culture of Sonepur. It is said that Ahimanikya and Sasisena were in love in school and married secretly. After their marriage, they came to Sonepur which was also known as Kamitapura during that time.

However, their marriage was rocked by a Tantric maiden named Jynanadei Maluni (alias Madana Maluni). She was attracted by the beauty of Ahimanikya. One day while Ahimanikya was alone out in the market; Jynanadei Maluni induced him and brought him to her house. Then she transformed Ahimanikya into a lamb by virtue of her tantric power. It is said that during the night time she used to transform the lamb to Ahimanikya and romanced with him. However, during the daytime she used to transform him to a lamb.

Having lost her husband, a disappointed Sasisena searched Ahimanikya in every corner of the Sonepur kingdom. After some time she got an appointment with the king of Sonepur and was selected to become a soldier in the Sonepur royal army. She was very successful and earned name and fame after she killed a man-eating tiger. The king of Sonepur was so impressed that he desired to give his daughter in marriage to Sasisena. As Sasisena could not reveal her actual identity she was forced to marry the Sonepur's princess. Nonetheless, after marriage she revealed her story to the princess of Sonepur kingdom.

The princess was moved by her pathetic situation and offered all possible help to Sasisena. They searched all places in Sonepur. It was described that then they planned cleverly and build a big tank with four temples on the four corners. A festival was organized for the dedication of the tank and all people of Sonepur were invited for it. Jynanadei Maluni came with Ahimanikya to enjoy the festival. Ahimanikya could recognize Sasisena and informed her secretly by writing on the wall of the temple that she is under the captive of Jynanadei Maluni. A clever Sasisena informed the king of Sonepur that she wanted to sacrifice some lambs before Goddess Bhagawati and requested the king to bring the lamb of Jynanadei Maluni.

Jynanadei Maluni brought her lamb and the lamb was none other than Ahimanikya. By the order of his highness, the king of Sonepur, Jynanadei Maluni transformed him to the human form. It was said that at the desire of Sonepur Raja both the princess of Sonepur and Sasisena became the wives of Ahimanikya.

This story is still alive in the memory of people of Subarnapur district. As an evidence to this tantric episode the Sasisena Temple is located in the Subarnapur town.

== Analysis ==
The main plot is considered to be derived from a folktale. Shri Janakibhallaba Mohanty argued that it was an adaptation of the story Halahala Kumar, a "popular theme" in Odisha. The story is also said to be "widely current" in Subarnapur even in modern times.

=== Motifs ===
According to Indian scholars, the Jyana Dei appears as a sorcerous character in Odishan folktales. She appears as part of a group of seven maidens, called Tantrasadhikas or tantrikas, who practiced a form of Vajrayana (the Tantric form of Buddhism) in a region called Kuanri Patna or Kumari Patna: Gyana Dei Maluni (or Jyanadadei, or Gyanadei Maliani), Netei Dhobani, Lahukuti Lahuruni, Sukuti Chamaruni, Sua Teluni, Gangi Gauduni (or Gangei Gouduni), and Patarapindhi Sauruni.

== See also ==
- Paschima Lanka
- Cultural Profile of South Kosal
- Kosalananda Kavya
- Subarnapur district
- Sonepur
- Kosal
- Kosal state movement
- Sureswari Temple
- Subarnameru Temple
- Lankeswari Temple
- Patali Srikhetra
- The story of Halahala Kumar
- The Ruby Prince (Punjabi folktale)
- The Story of Hira and Lal
