= Kalasi Jatra =

Kalasi Jatra or Kailasi Jatra is a Hindu festival observed in the Boudh, Subarnapur and Balangir district of Kosal region of Odisha, India. This festival is celebrated on the holy month of Kartika. During this festival, the goddess is taken out from the worshiping centre to outside in a big musical procession. The devotees pray the goddess and the celebration takes place until late night. It is considered a festival of tribal origin and emphasizes the fact that the Kosal region is known for its Shakti and tantric culture.

== See also ==
- Pushpuni
- Jiuntia
- Dhanu Jatra
- Kosaleswara temple
- Kosal
- Kosal State Movement
- Kosalananda Kavya
- Cultural Profile of South Kosal
