= Sureswari temple =

Coordinates: 20.839169°N 83.912946°E

Religion
- Affiliation: Hinduism
- District: Subarnapur district
- Deity: sureswari Shakti

Location
- Location: Sonepur
- State: Odisha
- Country: India
- Interactive map of Sureswari temple

Sureswari temple is located at the left bank of Tel River towards the south-west of the confluence of Mahanadi and Tel River. This temple is located in the temple town of Sonepur, Subarnapur district, Odisha, India. The presiding deity is maa Sureswari, and it is well known as one of the oldest Shakti shrine. In the western part of Odisha, most people are devotees of Maa sureswari.

== See also ==
- Subarnameru Temple
- Kosaleswara Temple
- Lankeswari Temple
- Patali Srikhetra
