= Metakani Temple =

Temple in Odisha, India

Maa Metakani temple is located in a forest near to Ulunda, of Subarnapur district, Odisha, India. People of this region say that this goddess is originated from a lady called "META".

== See also ==
- Subarnameru Temple
- Lankeswari Temple
- Patali Srikhetra
