= History of Kalahandi =

The history of Kalahandi goes back to the primitive period where a well-civilized, urbanized, and cultured people inhabited this land mass around 2000 years ago. The world's largest celt of Stone Age and the largest cemetery of the megalithic age have been discovered in Kalahandi. This shows the region had a civilized culture since the pre-historic era. Asurgarh near Narla in Kalahandi was one of the oldest metropolises in Odisha whereas the other one was Sisupalgarh near Bhubaneswar. Some other historical forts in the region includes Budhigarh (ancient period), Amthagarh (ancient period), Belkhandi (ancient to medieval period) and Dadpur-Jajjaldeypur (medieval period). This land was unconquered by the great Ashoka, who fought the great Kalinga War, as per Ashokan record. In medieval period the region had played a prominent role to link South India, Eastern India and Central India region and witnessed the battle ground for Somavamsi, Chola, Kalachuris of Kalyani and Eastern Ganga dynasty. Kalahandi region was the main route for Chola to attack Subarnapur.

The history of Kalahandi is rich in terms of contribution towards the Indian culture and temple architecture. Temple of Goddess Stambeswari at Asurgarh, built during 500 AD, is a perfect example where the first brick Temple in Eastern India was built. Sanskritization in Odisha was first started from Kalahandi, Koraput region, ancient Mahakantara region. Earliest flat-roofed stone temple of Odisha was built at Mohangiri in Kalahandi during 600 AD. Temple architecture achieved perfection at Belkhandi in Kalahandi and then traversed to Ekamra, present Bhubaneswar, along with the political expansion of the Somavamsis during the 1000–1100 AD.

The distribution and occurrence of precious and semi-precious gemstones and other commercial commodities of Kalahandi region have found place in accounts of Panini (5th century BC), Kautilya (3rd century BC), Ptolemy (2nd century AD), Wuang Chuang (7th century AD) and Travenier (19th century AD). Present name Kalahandi finds mention for the first time in the Junagarh Dadhivaman temple inscription issued from Kalahandinagara by Maharaja Jugasai Dev in A. D. 1718... The region was known as various names in different period of time such as Kantara, Mahakantara, Titilaka Janapada, Atavi Land, Chakrakota Mandala, Kamala Mandala and Karonda Mandal. It was also part of Trikalinga for a certain period. It was a feudatory under Eastern Ganga dynasty, Gadajat under Maratha and Princely State under British rule in India. After independence of India, in 1948, Kalahandi joined Indian Union and became a part of Odisha state. However, in post independence period the name Kalahandi got associated with backwardness despite its rich history, culture, art, craft and agriculture & forest resources.

== Prehistoric Era: cradle of civilization ==
The finding of plant fossil in the southwest basin of the Tel river in Kalahandi pushes back of the antiquity of primeval shrub on this landmass to at least 0.1 million years before the present.

=== Stone Age culture (15th millennium BC to 2nd millennium BC) ===
Archaeological record of Tel valley reveals the presence of the primates in its various zones during the Pleistocenephase. Paleolithic is being documented in Kalahandi, like Moter river basin in Dharamgarh region. The prehistoric painting in Gudahandi in Kalahandi shows a well advanced human settlement in the region. World's largest size celt (axe) of late Stone Age culture has been recovered from Chandrasagarnala in Kalahandi. This is the largest stone Axe of the world measuring 47 cm and weighing 2.5 kg, which shows very sophisticated workmanship. Similarly mesolithic and neolithic historical records are evident in Bijadongar, Koradongar [Junagarh], Gudahandi, Bicchakhaman, Budigarh, Chandrasagarnala, Karlapada, Bhaludongar, Chilpa, Habaspur, Belkhandi, Jamugudapadar, Dongargarh, Asurgarh, Phurlijharan, Ghantmal, Kuttrukhamar, Jampadar, Pipalnala, Godang, Budipadar, Mahimapadia, Nehena, Penjorani, Yogimath etc. in Kalahandi. The findings include hand axe, cleaver, pebble tools (chopper-chopping), core, blade, flake, point, celt, ring stones, microlithics, coarse pottery, grooving marks, cave art (painting & carving) etc.

=== Copper – Bronze Age (1600 BC to 1000 BC) ===
The provenances in this period are Jamugudapadar, Chandrasagarnala, Urlukupagarh, Budigarh (M. Rampur), Bhimkela – Asurgarh, Kholigarh (Belkhandi) etc. in Kalahandi and the finding include celt, ring stone, microlithc, colourful and sophisticated ceramic, graffiti / sign / alphabet (Harappan & Megalithic), copper items, gold article, high tin bronze objects, precious and semi – precious stone beads, terracotta figurines, house foundation, spindle – whorl, weight stone, and mud brick.

=== Iron Age and Megalithic (1000 BC to 700 BC) ===
Menhir and stone circles of megalithic Iron Age at Bhairavapada (Junagarh), Ruppangudi, Sagada, Bileikani, Themra, Bhawanipatna etc. Iron smelting zone and cemetery Juxtaposed to the settlement is discerned in some of the above sites, which reveal iron tools of war and peace, slages, ceramics, Terra-cottas, firebaked brick, furnace, semi-precious stone beads and micro beads. Beginning of early Iron Age Kalahandi may be placed in the first millennium BC in which black and red ware was the diagnostic pottery type. Next phase of Iron Age represents to early history that was concomitants with state formation and urbanization and technological break through besides voluminous trade, agriculture surplus and heterogeneous social complex in ancient Kalahandi. The material culture of Iron Age found in Kalahandi included semi-precious beads, terracotta figurines, iron implements of war and peace, decorated and plain ceramic, burnt brick, hopscotch (gaming items), spindle whorl, weight stone etc. The largest Megalithic Cemetery was found in the river bank of the Tel river Bileikani, Kalahandi.

== Early history ==
=== Kantara ===
Mahabharata refers to the territory known as Kantara Sahadeva was said to have vanquished during his southern campaign. Kantara was extended from the up to the bank of river Vena, tributary of Godavari. It is generally accepted that Kantara means a forest-tract of 'wilderness'. The present Kalahandi and undivided Koraput district of Odisha and Bastar district of Chhattisgarh most probably comprised the Kantara kingdom of Mahabharata. Kantara kingdom has been also referred to in the Sanskrit works like Brihatsamhita and the Puranas.

=== Titilaka Janapada ===
Around 500–100 BC Asurgarh–Narla served as the political, cultural, and commercial hub of the Taitilaka Janapada & Atavikas. Very much details of early history of Kalahandi area is unknown. Sera Vanija Jataka describes about merchants sailing in the Telavana which is identified as Tel river due to oil traffic in the early period. Taitilaka Janapada described in Ashtadhyayi of Grammarin Paanini comprised part of modern Kalahandi and Balangir district, around Titlagarh. The region was famous for brisk trade in rhinoceros ride and Tel river valley was carrying commerce and trade through navigation.

=== Atavi Land ===
During the period of Maurya emperor Ashoka, Kalahandi along with Koraput and Bastar region was called Atavi Land. Around 261 BC intimidation of Ashoka the Great occurred to the Atavikas after the devastating Kalinga war in Rock Edict – XIII, and Kalinga Edict – II[Jaugad version] was separated. The possible reason could be:– The Atavikas opposed the mining operation plan of the monarch at Indravanaka and other places to obtained Diamond and precious Gem stones. The Atavika land remained Abhijita [ unconquered] when neighbouring Kalinga [coastal Orissa] lost its independence. Asurgarh seems to be an important centre of Atavika territory and the excavation amply indicates that this area was not under developed during the days of Ashoka and the people had a high standard of civilisation characterised by well polished potteries of northern black polished fabric.

=== Indravana ===
In the 4th century BC Kalahandi region was known as Indravana from where precious gem-stones and diamonds were collected for the imperial Maurya treasury. Around the 1st to 3rd century AD ancient Kalahandi [Atavika land] had a commercial and sociocultural relationship with the Chedi of Kalinga and Kusana empire of the northwest. In Amaravati stupa inscription the land is designated as Mahavana.

Tel river is a major tributary of Tel river under Mahanadi Basin rising in the north of Umarkote Tahsil in Nabarangpur district, it passes through few km in Chhattisgarh and then enters into Kalahandi, Balangir district and finally meets Mahanadi in Sonepur district near Manamunda. The important feeders of 150 miles Tel river on its right bank are Moter, Hati, Sagada, Bulat, Ret, Utei and Rahul whereas on its left bank tributaries are Suktel, Lanth, Under, Sungad, Udanti etc. Tel river civilization put light towards a great civilization existing in Kalahandi in the past that is recently getting explored. The discovered archaeological wealth of Tel Valley suggest a well civilized, urbanized, cultured people inhabited on this land mass around 2000 years ago and Asurgarh was its capital.

=== Asurgarh–Narla area ===
The Asurgarh (Fort of Asura) existed in the period from 400 BC to 500 AD was one of the ancient metropolis. Asurgarh served as the political, cultural, and commercial hub of the Taitilaka Janapada & Atavikas. It is almost rectangular in shape having four gates piercing the surrounding mammoth wall that is made of brick, rubble and earth. After the wall, a wide and deep moat girdles the fort on three sides respectively on the north, south and east. The fort area measures 24.29 hectares of land. On the west of the fort, the river Sandol flows close to the western rampat towards north to meet the river Utei, a tributary of the Tel, about 3 km from the fort site. Close to the eastern ditch, the builders of the fort excavated a huge water reservoir measuring 200 acres of land. It is popularly known as Asursagar. It has been pointed out that the water of the reservoir could be trained into the ditch of the fort through two sluices gate. On the southwest corner of the fort, another small tank was dug, which is known today by its name Radhasagar. Habitation zone of the peoples is being documented towards the south and north of the fort immediately after the fortified wall. Lowe town or habitation area is further superimposed by another mud wall within 100 hectares radius at each settlement zone, the mud wall has single gate in the middle.

=== Asurgarh-Manamunda ===
The other early urban center bearing the nomenclature-Asurgarh is located on the confluence of the river Mahanadi and Tel near Manamanda of Sonepur-Boudh region of Western Orissa. This site is designated as Asurgarh-Manamunda to distinguish it from other site bearing same appellation. It is believed that the culture of Asugarh-Manamunda is from the 4th century BC to the 3rd century AD.

=== Budhigarh ===
Budhigarh or literally the fort of the old lady is one of the ancient urban centers in Kalahandi and configures on the right bank of the river Rahul in Kalahandi. The location of Budigarh is moreover on the ancient salt route range of Mohangiri that connected Kalinga, South-Kosala and Kantara. It was the strategic location of Budhigarh which seems to have contributed for the rise of township in ancient period. Fortification of Budhigarh is discerned towards its west where a huge brick wall runs in south–north direction. The total settlement area of Budhigarh spreads over 12.75 hectares of land. The urban center of Budhigarh is 20 km from the metropolitan center of Kharligarh.

=== Kharligarh ===
This site is near the confluence of the river Rahul and Tel around Tushra (Balangir district) whose fortification demonstrates it as one of the metropolises of ancient Odisha. The fort was planned one a piece of horse-shoe shape land measuring 18 hectares, on the right bank of river Rahul. It is a rectangular fort. Rhul river meanders in the fort on three sides in 'U' shape respectively in its south, east and north and then flows towards north to meet the river Tel one km from the fort site. The time period of this fort is verified from 200 BC to 200 AD. (Period I) and 200 AD to 400 AD (Period II).

=== Urlukupagarh ===
Urlukupagarh is one of the ancient urban centers on the right bank of the present river Utei, also known as Gauraveni in early medieval time, of Madanpur Rampur in Kalahandi. The entire settlement area is under cultivation.

=== Sirpur ===
Archaeological site of Sirpur, another ancient urban center in Kalahandia, lies on the right bank of Sandol river of Kalahandi. The river Tel bounded its north and Asurgarh–Narla on the south. Perhaps the strategic situation of the site in the ancient Attavi or Kantara kingdom ultimately gave rise to township here. The finding zone of Sirpur spreads along the left bank of the Sandol river in east–west axis covering an area about 8 hectares.

=== Dumerbahal-Gupti ===
Dumerbahal-Gupti was another ancient town on the Southern basin of Ret river situated about 10 km from ancient metropolis Asurgarh–Narla. Tradition bespeaks the settlement as one of the territorial entity of Asurgarh–Narla during the reign of king Vyaghraraja.

=== Nehna ===
Nehan is located in the upper Tel valley and is three km from Khariar town in Nuapada district.

=== Amthagad ===
Amathguda or Amthagad is a fort, situated on the right bank of the river Tel to the place where the road leading towards Balangir crosses the river. The Udayapur area, the capital of Rashtrakuta kings who ruled the valley, is still dotted with standing structure and ruins mostly found at Amathgad. Ruins of a medieval fort too exist here.

=== Terasinga ===
It is one of the ancient urban centers in Kalahandi located near Kesinga.

== Ancient history ==
=== Mahakantara (500 BC to 500 AD) ===
In the beginning of the Christian era probably it was known as Mahavana. During the 4th century AD the territory was referred to as Mahakantara (Greater forest). Both Mahavana and Mahakantara are synonymous terms representing the same land. Mahakantara comprising Sambalpur, Bilaspur and Raipur were two distinct but neighboring territories. Originally these two geographical units were known as Kantara and in Mahabharata. In the 4th century AD Vyaghraraja was ruling over Mahakantara comprising Kalahandi, undivided Koraput and Bastar region. Asurgarh was capital of Mahakantara. In ancient history Asurgarh region was transition point for trading between Kaling, Mahakantara. Asurgarh bears special importance so far as the Atavika people are concerned. These people find mention in Ashokan edicts and they are considered to have constituted the fighting forces of Kalinga against Ashoka in the famous Kalinga war. But after defeating him the state of Mahakantara was returned to Vyaghraraj, as the Gupta influence in the Deccan was more of cultural than of political significance. The impact of Gupta culture in Kalahandi region is known from the rise of Saktism, Saiviam and Vaishaniam as well as spread of Sanskrit culture in this area in post-Gupta period. In the 5th century AD Sanskritization in Orissa was first started from Kalahandi – Koraput [ancient Kantara]. Kalahandi was the cradle of Stambeswari Creed in the 5th century AD due to Sanskritization, which was a forerunner of Jagannatha, Balabhadra and Subhadra or Jagannatha Cult. The first brick temple in Eastern India, the temple of Goddess Stambeswari, was built at Asurgarh during the 5th century AD.

=== Parvatadwarakas ===
After Vyaghraraja, the Nala kings, whose headquarters was at Puskari identified with modern Podagars near Umarkote in Nabarangpur district, like Bhavadatta Varman, Arthapati and Skanda Varman ruled over south part of this region up to about 500 AD, the territory was known as Nalavadi-visaya and rest of Mahakantara, lower part of Tel river valley was ruled by king Tastikara and his scions, the kingdom was known as Parvatad-waraka, whose headquarters was Talabhamraka near Belkhandi.

In the 6th century AD a new kingdom developed in the Kalahandi tract under King Tustikara, but very little is known about other kings of his family. Maraguda valley in Nuapada district was identified as capital of Sarabapuriyas. The earliest flat roofed stone temple of Orissa was built at Mohangiri in Kalahandi during the 6th century AD.

== Medieval history ==
Kalahandi region was scramble for power among Eastern Gangas, Rastrakutas, Somas, Kalachuris, Chindaka Nagas and Gangas from 6th to 14th centuries.

- This period dalvanized Temple Art and Architecture
- Rajpadar – Belkhandi was the greenhouse of temple architecture in Odisha, where the architect succeeded in erecting the must complex temple structure – construction of garbhagriha, mahamandapa, mandapa, and ardhamandapa of brick in an axis. Odisha Temple architecture achieved perfection at Belkhandi and then traversed to Ekamra, present Bhubaneswar, along with the political expansion of the Somavamsis during the 10th and 11th centuries AD.
- During this time trade Guild like "Kamalavanavanikasangha" came into existence
- The Gangas Circulated Gold Coin popularly known as Gangapana
- The process of urbanization continued unabatedly throughout medieval age

=== Trikalinga ===
By 9th or 10th century the region including Western Orissa, Kalahandi, Koraput and Bastar was known as Trikalinga along with Kalinga, Utkal and Dakshina Kosala kingdom. The Somavamsi king Mahabhavagupta I Janmejaya (925 AD - 960 AD) assumed the title Trikalingadhipati.

The period between 10th and 13th centuries was a period of great political disturbance in kalinga, utkala, South Kosal and Trikalinga area due to continuing warfare between Saomavansi, Kalachuri, Chindaka Naga, Chola and Ganaga dynasties and Kalahandi became marching route of army and battle field of many battles. There was virtual competition among different powers to become Trikalingadhipati. This period saw Somavansi rulers gradually shifting their capital to safer places to combat inroad of Kalachuries from Chhattisgarh region. Perhaps during this period they moved their capital of South Kosal to Subarnapur-Boudh belt.

During the period of internal dispute in Somavansi family, the general of Rajendra Chola vanquished Indra Ratha of Somavanshi. However, the successor of Indra Ratha, Chandihara Jajati 2nd was defeated by Kalachuri king Gngayadev of Tumura. This prompted him to shift his capital from Jajati Nagar near Boudh to coastal belt at Jajpur and divided Somavansi empire into two parts, the Western part Kosala remain in charge of a Governor belonging to Somavansi family.

=== Chakrakota Mandala ===
Trikalinga was short lived and Chindakangas carved out a new kingdom called Chakrakota Mandala or Bramarakota Mandala, which later one expanded to whole Kalahandi and Koraput. Nagas started ruling Kalahandi since 1006 AD. Though some historian believe Kalahandi was under Chakrakota Mandala, few other believe few parts of Kalahandi was with other Western Orissa part, separated from Utkala by Udaya Keshari in 1040 AD. During this period Chindakangas raised hoods from Kalahandi, Koraput and Bastar region and Chindakangas Someswar Dev defeated Janmejaya II of Kosala branch of Somavansi and made his Telugu Chola general as feudatory chief of Subarnapur.

In 1023 AD the Chola army of Rajendra Chola I, proceeded through the course of Tel river from Vengi to reach Yayatinagar near Sonepur. Around 1110 AD, Kalachuri dynastry from Ratnapur defeated and dethroned the Telugu Chola feudatory chief of Subarnapur. He also marched over kingdom of Chindaknag, perhaps Kalahandi was part of it, causing immense loss. The Kalachuri group ruled 50 years in Subarnapur region, but nothing is clear about Chakrakota Madala including large part of Kalahandi except Madanpur Rampur region which was feudatory of Somavansi. The goddess of Chindakangas was Manikyadevi alied Manikeswari, present deity of Kalahandi. However, remains and influence of Kalachuri such as sati stones are obtained in Kalahandi as per archaeological evidences.

During the same period there was confusion and anarchy in Utkal branch of Somavansi (in coastal part of present Orissa) and Eastern Ganga dynasty king Chodaganga Dev defeated last Somavansi king of Utkal and tried to capture upper Mahanadi valley (Western Orissa and Chhattisgarh region) and Trikalinga region. Chodaganga Dev had to fight with Ratnadev II of Kalachuris and met a crushing defeat. Chindakangas made friendship with Eastern Ganga dynasty king and thus invited wrath of Kalachuris, who crushed Chakrakota Nagar in order to terrorise Ganga king. At last in more than 100 years of fighting Anaga Bhimdev-III of Eastern Ganga dynasty defeated Kalachuris, during this period Western Orissa region went under Eastern Ganga dynasty.

=== Kamala Mandala ===
As per Darbar record of History of Naga dynasty of Kalahandi is the only dynasty in Orissa having a record of thousand years (1050–1948 AD). During the 12th century AD, Chkrakota Mandal was incorporated with the Eastern Ganga dynasty (of Kalinga-Utkal) realm and renamed as Kamala Mandala, thus, Kalahandi region became part of Kalinga as a feudatory of the Eastern Ganga dynasty under Nagas rules until the 14th century. Recent archaeological finding of Dadpur-Jajjaldeypur Fort of 20 hectares of land suggest that Dadpur was capital of Kamal Mandala during Ganga monarch Anangbhimadeva in the 13th century. It appears that the imperial Gangas had two provincial headquarters respectively ar Sonepur (Mahanadi valley) and another at Kamal Mandal (Kalahandi or Tel valley).

During the long power struggle the other parts of Western Orissa region turned to a vassal state with no importance as the Eastern Ganga dynasty rulers were weakened by frequent foreign invasion of Muslims. Finally local power like Naga and Chauhans raised head. After the 14th century Nagas owed allegiance from Eastern Ganga dynasty to the Surjayavamsi Gajapatis. Since 1568 Nagas ruled Kalahandi independently.

== Modern history ==
=== Nagavamsi rule (1400 AD to 1947 AD) ===
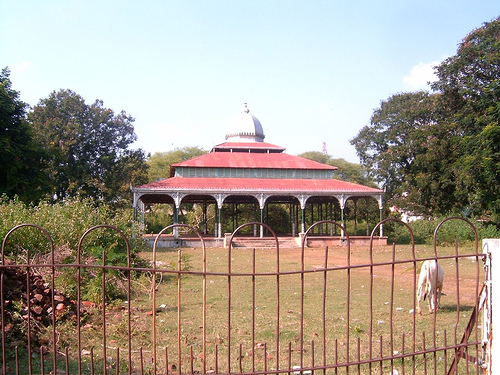
Sabha Mandap, Bhawanipatna Palace

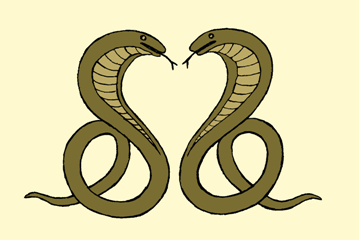
Coat of arms of the Naga dynasty

As per the traditional record preserved in Kalahandi Darbar assert that Nagas succeeded the Gangas in Kalahandi hailed from Chot Nagpur. The last Ganga Governor of Kalahandi, Jagannath Deo, had no male issue and his only daughter was married to Raghunath Sai, a prince of the Naga house of Chot Nagpur. Once Raja Jagannath Deo went on pilgrimage with his Rani to northern India and on his return was not allowed by his son in law to enter the kingdom. Raghunath Sai usurped the Throne of Kalahandi in 1005 AD and then started the rule of Naga dynasty and following genealogy of the Naga dynasty of Kalahandi.

Genealogy of the Naga Dynasty of Kalahandi

- Raghunath Sai (1005–1040 AD)
- Pratap Narayan Deo (1040–1072 AD)
- Birabar Deo (1072–1108 AD)
- Jugasai Deo I (1108–1142 AD)
- Udenarayan Deo (1142–1173 AD)
- Harichandra Deo (1173–1201 AD)
- Ramachandra Deo (1201–1234 AD)
- Gopinath Deo (1234–1271 AD)
- Balabhadra Deo (1271–1306 AD)
- Raghuraj Deo (1306–1337 AD)
- Rai Singh Deo I (1337–1366 AD)
- Haria Deo (1366–1400 AD)
- Jugasai Deo II (1400–1436 AD)
- Pratap Narayan Deo II (1436–1468 AD)
- Hari Rudra Deo (1468–1496 AD)
- Anku Deo (1496–1528 AD)
- Pratap Deo (1528–1564 AD)
- Raghunath Deo (1564–1594 AD)
- Biswambhar Deo (1594–1627 AD)
- Rai Singh Deo II (1627–1658 AD)
- Dusmant Deo (1658–1693 AD)
- Jugasai Deo III (1693–1721 AD)
- Khadag Rai Deo (1721–1747 AD)
- Rai Singh Deo III (1747–1771 AD)
- Purusottam Deo (1771–1796 AD)
- Jugasai Dei IV (1796–1831 AD)
- Fate Narayan Deo (1831–1853 AD)
- Udit Pratap Deo I (1853–1881 AD)
- Raghu Keshari De (1894–1897 AD)
- Court of Wards (1897–1917 AD)
- Brajamohan Deo (1917–1939 AD)
- Pratap Keshari Deo (1939 until the merger with Orissa state)

However, historians do not accept such an early date for the establishment of Naga dynasty rule in Kalahandi. As per historian the Nagas succeeded the Gangas in Kamalamandala during the 15th century taking advantage of the weakness of the Central authority, the Gangas of Orissa. This was the period when the Chauhans of Patna roused to power.

This created genealogy and established en – rapport with the turbulent Khond tribe and started special kind of Abhiseka ceremony at Jugasaipatna, where on a stone, the prince was sitting on the lap of Pat Maghi (Chief of the Khond tribe) and then crowned by the tribes in order to legitimating the royalty.

Junagarh designated as "Kalahandinagara" was selected as capital with Kanaka Durga as tutelary deity. Thirty one kings from Raghunath Sai to Pratap Kesari Deo ruled over Kalahandi and the Naga kings claimed authority over eighteen Gads/Garh.

The Maratha Power of Nagpur intervened in Kalahandi during 1788 AD and Raja Purussottama Deo was recognised as the Raja of Kalahandi by the Maratha Chief Raghujee Bhonsala.

In 1853, the Nagpur state lapsed to the British Crown as Raghujee III died without an heir and Kalahandi came under the control of the British during the reign of Raja Fate Narayan Deo who shifted also the capital of Kalahandi from Kalahandinagara (Junagarh) to Bhaumadevapatna alias Bhawanipatna and accorded recognition to the local deity Manikeswari.

In 1855, first Kond rebellion took Place. Lt. Macneill, the agent of the hilly tracts was attacked at Urladani when the latter arrested Rindo Majhi.

In 1882, the second Kond rebellion took place during the reign of queen Asha Kumari.

Modernity entered into Kalahandi during the reign of Brajamohan Deo, who occupied the Throne in 1917. In 1939, Maharaja Pratap Kesari Deo succeeded to the throne.

=== Karonda Mandal ===
Kalahandi became a princely state under British and known as Karonda Mandal. Maharaja Pratap Keshari Deo, the Ex-Maharaja of Kalahandi, in one of his articles expressed his view that the historical significance of naming Kalahandi as Karunda Mandala is based on the availability of Corundum in this region. Manikeswari (the goddess of Manikya), the clan deity of the Naga kings of Kalahandi may have also necessitated the adoption of the name.

== Post-Independence period ==
=== Integration and anti-merger movement ===
Following the independence of India, the princely state of Kalahandi was integrated into the Dominion of India on 1 January 1948. Prior to the signing of the Instrument of Accession, Maharaja Pratap Keshari Deo and several local leaders had advocated for Kalahandi to join the proposed Eastern States Union rather than merging with the province of Orissa.

The merger process faced opposition within the district, leading to an anti-merger agitation. Protesters organized demonstrations, distributed leaflets, and raised slogans demanding a separate state, expressing concerns that Kalahandi's interests would be marginalized within an expanded Orissa province. During the course of these agitations, numerous demonstrators were arrested and imprisoned by the provincial government. A memorandum seeking the intervention of Mahatma Gandhi was drafted by the agitators, though it ultimately did not alter the merger's outcome.

=== Part of modern Odisha state ===
On 1 November 1949, regional boundaries were reorganized; Patna, Balangir, and Subarnapur were constituted as a separate district, while the Nuapada sub-division of Sambalpur was added to Kalahandi. In 1967, the Kashipur block of Kalahandi was transferred to the Rayagada division for administrative purposes. In 1993, the Nuapada sub-division was carved out to form the separate Nuapada district. Despite this administrative division, the Kalahandi (Lok Sabha constituency) continues to encompass both present-day Kalahandi and Nuapada districts.

Historically, Kalahandi maintained a robust agriculture and forest-based economy, reportedly supplying 100,000 tons of rice during the Bengal famine. However, the district's trajectory shifted when it was struck by severe droughts in the 1960s and again in the 1980s. During the 1980s, the region garnered national attention for acute poverty, malnutrition, and starvation deaths, a socio-economic crisis that social workers and the media termed the "Kalahandi Syndrome". Author Tapan Kumar Pradhan has argued that while the droughts were a natural disaster, the ensuing starvation was exacerbated by administrative and systemic failures.

To address these chronic developmental challenges, the Central Government launched the KBK (Kalahandi-Balangir-Koraput) project in the 1990s. Over the decades, the district's systemic poverty drew visits from numerous high-profile political figures, including Prime Ministers Indira Gandhi, Rajiv Gandhi, and P. V. Narasimha Rao, highlighting the region's struggles on a national platform. Long-term infrastructure initiatives were gradually implemented to combat regional backwardness, including the development of the Upper Indravati Hydro Electric and Irrigation Project (approved in 1978) and the construction of National Highways 201 and 217. Development of local irrigation infrastructure, including the Jonk River and Patora dams, frequently faced logistical delays and cost escalations.

Since the 2000s, the partial commissioning of the Indravati Water Project—the second largest in the state—has significantly altered the agricultural landscape of southern Kalahandi. By enabling double-cropping, the project has spurred rapid agricultural growth in blocks such as Kalampur, Jaipatna, Dharamgarh, Junagarh, and Bhawanipatna. Consequently, Kalahandi has seen a boom in agro-industries, boasting the highest number of rice mills among Odisha's districts, with more than 70% of these facilities established in the five years following the project's launch.

In the mid-2000s, Kalahandi became the center of a major environmental and indigenous rights controversy regarding a proposed bauxite mining and alumina refinery project by Vedanta Aluminium Limited (VAL) in the Niyamgiri hills. The project faced sustained opposition from local tribal communities (such as the Dongria Kondh) and international non-governmental organizations, citing potential violations of forest rights and severe environmental degradation.
