= Phulamuthi =

Phulamuthi Fulmuthi
- Village
- Location in Odisha, India Phulamuthi (India)
- Coordinates: 20.9945984°N 83.7915355°E
- Country: India
- State: Odisha
- District: Sonepur
- Elevation: 121 m (397 ft)

Languages
  - Official: Oriya
- Time zone: UTC+5:30 (IST)
- PIN: 767019
- Telephone code: 06654
- Vehicle registration: OD-31
- Website: odisha.gov.in

Phulamuthi (also known as Fulmuthi) is a village of Subarnapur district of Odisha. It is surrounded by two water streams namely Choukijor and Nalia. The village is famous for its green surroundings.

== Nuakhai Bhet Ghat ==
Nukhai is one of the major festivals of the western part of Odisha. It is also observed in some parts of Jharkhand and Bihar. On this day, people from western Odisha celebrate across the globe by eating nua (new paddy) followed by different kinds of delicious dishes. People of Phulamuthi celebrate it as a special occasion. They eat nua and greet all. It is followed by much entertainment. People from neighboring villages also participate in the late night entertainment.

== Education ==
There is primary education available up to class 7. For high school education they rely on the nearest village.

- Government Primary School for class 1–5
- Maa maheswari Upper Primary School for class 6–7
- Pre-primary education available.

== Temples ==
- Maa maheswari temple
- Maa metakani temple

== Economy ==
The majority of people are employed in paddy farming. Some of them depend on vegetable farming, whereas the rest depend on weaving sari.

== Politics ==
The village comes under Charda panchayat of Binika block of sonepur district of Odisha. Its assembly-constituency is Birmaharajpur and Parliamentary Constituency is Bolangir.
