= Subarnapur =

Subarnapur may refer to:

- Subarnapur district in the state of Orissa, India
  - Subarnapur, Odisha or Sonepur, headquarters of Subarnapur district
- Subarnapur, Nepal
- Subarnapur, Nadia, a census town in West Bengal, India

== See also ==
- Sonepur (disambiguation)
