= Pratap Rudra Singh Deo =

Maharaja of Sonepur from 1891 to 1902

- Raja of Sonepur

11th Raja of Sonepur
- Reign: 9 September 1891 – 8 August 1902
- Coronation: 9 September 1891
- Predecessor: Niladhar Singh Deo
- Successor: Bir Mitrodaya Singh Deo
- Born: 22 July 1853; Sonepur, British India death_date = 8 August 1902 (aged 49)
- Died: Sonepur, British India
- Spouse: Amulyamani Devi
- Father: Niladhar Singh Deo
- Mother: Durga Devi
- Religion: Hinduism

Pratap Rudra Singh Deo (23 July 1853 – 8 August 1902) was Raja of Sonepur from 1891 until his death in 1902.

== Biography ==
He was born on 23 July 1853 to Niladhar Singh Deo. He succeeded his father on 11 September 1891. He had earned himself the reputation of a capable and wise ruler by his conduct and the management of his affairs. He obtained the title of Raja Bahadur on 1 January 1898 in recognition of the improved methods of administration he introduced. He died on 8 August 1902, and the succession passed to his eldest son, Bir Mitrodaya Singh Deo.
