= Lanka Podi =

Festival celebrated in Sonepur, Western Odisha, India

Lanka Podi or Lanka Pudi (English meaning: The Burning of Lanka) is a festival celebrated in Sonepur region of Western Odisha, India. Many claim this festival is a further evidence that Sonepur was known as Paschima Lanka. It is observed annually on Bhadra Amavasya or commonly known as Saptapuri Amabasya as per traditional Hindu calendar.
