= Bir Mitrodaya Singh Deo =

Maharaja of Sonepur from 1902 to 1937

- Maharaja of Sonepur
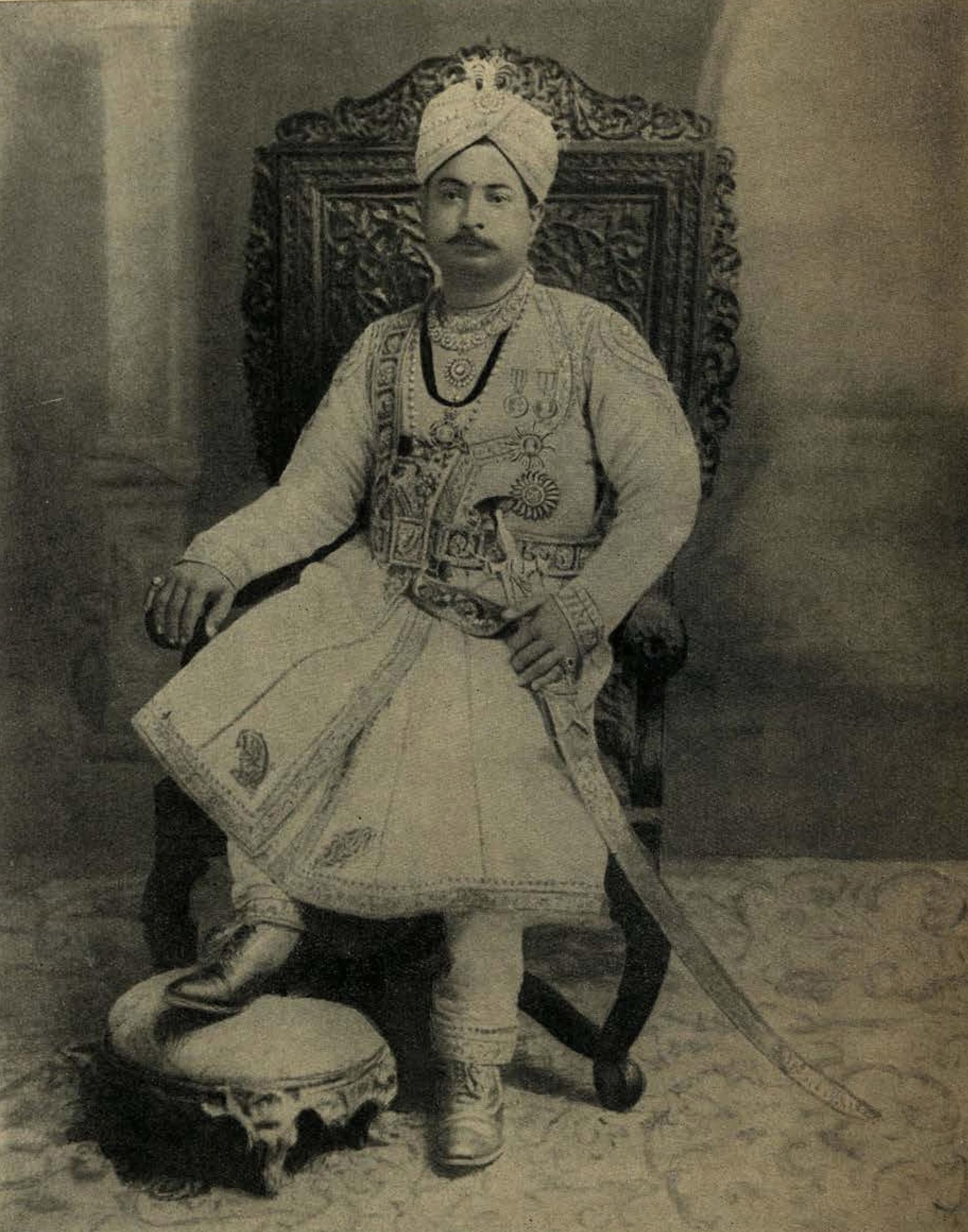
- Full length portrait of Bir Mitrodaya Singh Deo, the Maharaja of Sonepur

12th Maharaja of Sonepur
- Reign: 8 August 1902 – 29 April 1937
- Coronation: 8 August 1902
- Predecessor: Pratap Rudra Singh Deo
- Successor: Sudhansu Shekhar Singh Deo
- Born: 8 July 1874; Sonepur, Odisha, India
- Died: 29 April 1937 (aged 62); Sonepur, Odisha, India
- Spouse: Parvati Devi
- Issue: Somabushan Singh Deo; Sudhansu Shekhar Singh Deo
- Father: Pratap Rudra Singh Deo
- Mother: Amulyamani Devi
- Religion: Hinduism

Bir Mitrodaya Singh Deo KCIE (8 July 1874 – 29 April 1937), was Maharaja of Sonepur from 1902 until his death in 1937.

== Biography ==
He was born on 8 July 1874 to Pratap Rudra Singh Deo and his wife Amulyamani Devi. He succeeded his father on 8 August 1902. He was installed by Officiating Chief Minister at Sambalpur in November 1902. He was a very popular and just ruler. The Maharaja was a lover of literature and a patron of learning, and he established schools for boys and girls throughout his state. He was honoured with KCIE in 1918. The Mukti Mandap of Puri conferred on him the title of Dharmaniddhi on account of his liberality and pious deeds. Similarly, Bangiya Sanskruta Mahamandala conferred on him the title of Jnangunakar on account of his immense contributions to the world of knowledge. The British Government highly praised his sound administration and gave him the title of Maharaja in 1908, which was made hereditary in 1921, and he was subsequently granted permanent salute of nine guns. He died on 29 April 1937, and was succeeded by Sudhansu Shekhar Singh Deo as Maharaja of Sonepur.
