= Babupali =

- Village
- Interactive map of Babupali
- Coordinates: 21.12°N 83.74°E
- Country: India
- State: Odisha
- District: Subarnapur

Population (2017)
  - Total: 4,126

Languages
  - Official: Odia
- Time zone: UTC+5:30 (IST)
- Postal code: 767045
- Area code: 06654
- Vehicle registration: OD-31
- Sex ratio: 900 ♂/♀
- Literacy: 66.56%
- Precipitation: 1,443.5 millimetres (56.83 in)
- Avg. summer temperature: 48.7 °C (119.7 °F)
- Avg. winter temperature: 16.6 °C (61.9 °F)
- Website: www.subarnapur.nic.in

Babupali is a village in the state of Odisha, in the Subarnapur district.

== Geography ==
Babupali is located at 21.12°N 83.74°E. It has an average elevation of 383 metres (800 feet) above sea level.

== Temples ==
There are five Hindu temples in Babupali; these include:

- Maa Samaleswari Temple (Samalei Gudi). Dedicated to Maa Samalei.
- Gopaljee Temple - Oldest temple in Babupali village dedicated to Lord Krishna.
- Jagannath Temple - Dedicated to Lord Jagannath
- Durga Temple - Dedicated to Lord Durga.
- Ram Temple - Dedicated to Lord Ram, Seeta, Laxman and Hanuman.
