= History of Sonepur, Odisha =

Sonepur is the district headquarters of Subarnapur district of Odisha, has a special place on the political and cultural map of India since the pre-historic period. It is bounded on the north by Sambalpur district, on the south and the South-East by Boudh district, on the east by Rairakhol sub-division of Sambalpur district and on the west by the ex-state Patna (Balangir district).

== Prehistory ==
The discovery of a large number of stone tools and weapons from different places in and around sonepur and the Rock Art of 'puja dunguri' near Adakasa, Binka Tahasil of subarnapur district support this presumption. The archaeological excavation of Asurgarh close to sonepur town and of Khambeswari pali on the bank of Mahanadi in Birmaharajpur sub-division of sonepur district and the discovery of Punch marked coins from sonepur makes us to believe of a human settlement on this region dating from 3rd century B.C. to 1st. century AD. The exact nature and the extent of sonepur kingdom in those period is not known.

== 8th century ==
The chronological history of Sonepur starts from 8th century AD. Suvarnapur or modern sonepur occupies a place of prime importance at different period under the rule of different royal families like the Bhanjas. The Somovamsis, the Telgu-chodas, the kalachuais, the Gangas and the chouhans who ruled over this territory.

== 1023–1040 ==
In the 8th century AD, the Sonepur region, known as Swarnapura was a part of khinjali mandal and was ruled by the Bhanjas as the feudatory of the Bhaumakaras of Tosali. The somovamsi ruler Janmajaya-I (850-885) occupied this region from the Bhanjas and laid the foundation of Suvarnapur kingdom and made it, the imperial capital of south kosala. Gradually, the Somovamsi kingdom extended as far as Utkala and for the better administration of the newly conquered territory, the empire was divided into two parts by the ruler Yayati- II (AD 1023-1040) as Utkala Desa with Abhivava Yayati nagar (modern Jajpur) as its capital, ruled by the king himself and kosala Desa with its headquarters at Suvarnapura which remained in charge of a princely royal blood. In AD 1070, the Telgu-chodas as the feudatory of the Chindaka Nagas of Bustar region, occupied Suvarnapura from the than Somovamsi viceroy and ruled over this region for a period of 45 years. In AD 1113, the Kalachuris expelled the Telgu-Chodas and ruled over Suvarnapura for about 100 years.

== 1211–1238 ==
In the meantime the Somovamsis were ousted from the Utkala region by the imperial Gangas who tried their best for 100 years to occupied Suvarnapura region from the Kalachuris. Ultimately this region was occupied by the imperial Ganga monarch Anangabhimadeva-III (AD 1211-1238). The discovery of Ganga gold coins from sonepur and the sonepur stone inscription confirm the Ganga rule over this region. As the Gangas neglected the administration of this territory due to their pre- -occupation with the Muslims of Bengal, this region was occupied by the Bhanjas, who first made sonepur as their capital and later on shifted it to Boudh due to the expansionist policy of the Chouhan Rulers of Patna.

== 1605–1630 ==
Meanwhile, the Chouhan rule was established in the patanagarh (Bolangir District) region by Ramai Deo . Later on, a branch of this family established themselves in Sambalpur as Balarama deva, its ruler. His successor, Balabhadradeva (AD 1605-1630) occupied sonepur region from the Bhanja ruler of Boudh Siddhabhanja deva. The next chouhan ruler of Sambalpur Madhukaradeva, constituted the newly conquered territory into a vassal state and entrusted it to his second son Madan Gopal, who laid the foundation of the chouhan kingdom of sonpur on AD 1640. Since then the chouhans ruled over sonepur kingdom till its merger with the Orissa province on 1 January 1948.

== 1750–1770 ==
The sonepur kingdom under Madan Gopal consisted of 160 villages including the zamin daries of Rampur, Sukha, Kamsara and Barpali. During the reign of his son and successor Lal Sai Deo, sonepur town was vary populous inhabited by 52000 peoples spreading over an area of three square miles. Further expansion of sonepur kingdom was under taken by the ruler Divya Singh Deo (AD 1750-1770). The territories between river Ang and Suktel and 63 villages of Rairakhole were included in sonepur kingdom. During the rule of Sobha Singh (AD 1771-1786) the panchara porgona of the neighbouring Boudh state was included in Sonepur.

== 1786–1841 ==
The next ruler Prithvi Singh Deo (1786–1841) was defeated by the Marathas and was imprisoned in Chanda jail for a long period. During his absence Rani Laxmipriya Devi managed the administration of the state. She had signed an agreement with the British East India company on 13th Dec.1803 by which sonepur state came under the British protection. Sonepur was declared as a Tributary state under British occupation. But with the defeat of the Marathas in the third Anglo-Maratha war on 1817, Raja Prithvi Singh was released and sonepur permanently came under British protection.

== 1855-1891 ==
His successor Raja Niladhar Sing Deo (AD 1855-1891) was very much loyal to British Government and rendered all possible help during sepoy mutiny, rebellion of Surendra Sai and the Kondh rebellion of Chakra Bisoi and was rewarded with the title 'Raja Bahadur' for these help. During his rule, Sonepur kingdom was placed under the Govt. of central provinces on 1861 and was recognized as a Feudatory state in 1867.

== 1899–1900 ==
After his death, his son Prataprudra singh Deo ascended the throne in 1891 and devoted his entire time and energy for the welfare of the subjects and the prosperity of the kingdom. The Land settlement work was undertaken from 1893 by the Dewan Trayambaka Rao sathe and then by Dewan Rai Saheb Dinabandhu Pattnaik and for the first time Rayatwari parcha showing the extent of land and an Assessment Register, showing the dues of the Rayats and Gountias were prepared. For the promotion of education in the state, a number of schools were opened and emergent relief works were undertaken during the famine of 1899–1900.

== 1902–1937 ==
The region of Bir Mitrodaya Singh Deo (AD 1902-1937) was regarded as the golden age for the all-round development of the kingdom. The British Govt. highly praised his sound administration and gave him the title of Maharaja. During his rule in 1905, Sonepur kingdom was transferred from central provinces and was placed with the commissioner of Orissa division under West.Bengal. Bir Mitradaya Singh Deo rendered a lot of help to the British Government during the first world war and for this help he was rewarded with the title of K.C.I.E. and the title of Maharaja was made hereditary. He had consolidated the Revenue laws and Rule of the kingdom and codified them in a book called "Bhumi Bidhi". For the financial support to different institutions and for the development of the state, the 'Sonepur state Trust Funds' was established in 1925. The Sonepur chair in English in the Ravenshaw College, Cuttack and the Sonepur chair in Oriya in the Calcutta University were established by his liberal donations. Maharaja B.M.Singh Deo had patronised a number of eminent scholars in his Durbar and published a large number of rare books.

== 1937 onwards ==
He was succeeded by his second son Majaraja Sudhansu Sekher Singh Deo in 1937, who was the last Chouhan ruler of Sonepur. He conducted a number of progressive reforms in the state for the welfare of the subjects. He desired to put the administration on a democratic line and established a council of ministers headed by a chief minister in March 1943. During his rule, Sonepur kingdom was merged with the Orissa province on 1 January 1948 and became a sub-division under Bolangir District. However, from 1 April 1993 Sonepur was given the status of a district headquarters.
