= Sasisena Temple =

Sasisena Temple or Nimunhi Temple ('temple with no entrance and exit') is located in Sonepur, Subarnapur district, Odisha, India. The Sasisena Kavya, written by Pratap Rai, a well-known 17th century poet, provides the story behind the temple. The present Sasisena temple was built by Maharaja Vira Mitrodaya Singh (1902-1937 AD). However, it is reported that the Sasisena memorial was built before the second half of 18th century AD.
