= Niladhar Singh Deo =

Raja of Sonepur from 1840 to 1891

- Raja of Sonepur

10th Raja of Sonepur
- Reign: 27 July 1841 – 9 September 1891
- Coronation: 30 August 1841
- Predecessor: Prithvi Singh Deo
- Successor: Pratap Rudra Singh Deo
- Born: 1838; Sonepur, Odisha, India
- Died: 9 October 1891; Sonepur, Odisha, India
- Spouse: Durga Devi
- Issue: Pratap Rudra Singh Deo; Bir Kalap Singh Deo; Bir Bahadur Singh Deo; Bir Mihir Singh Deo; Jang Bahadur Singh Deo
- Father: Prithvi Singh Deo
- Mother: Gundicha Devi
- Religion: Hinduism

Niladhar Singh Deo, known as Niladrinath Singh Deo (1838 – 9 September 1891), was Raja of Sonepur from 1841 until his death in 1891.

== Biography ==
He was born in 1838 to Prithvi Singh Deo and his wife Gundicha Devi. He succeeded his father on 27 July 1841 as a minor. He was educated and trained in matters of statecraft by his mother, Gundicha Devi. He gained an intimate acquaintance with English and could converse in it with ease and fluency. He used to read historical works in English. Sir Richard Temple described him in 1863 as "fairly verseü in English," and that "considering the isolated country where he lives, his comparative enlightenment is a matter for gratification, almost for surprise." Besides English, he was equally well-versed and proficient in Odia, Urdu, Sanskrit, and Bengali. He was extremely popular and very loyal. He obtained the title of Raja Bahadur for meritorious services rendered to British Government during the Sambalpur insurrection. He died on 9 September 1891, and was succeeded by Pratap Rudra Singh Deo as Raja of Sonepur.
