= Sirjapali =

- Village
- Location in Odisha, India Sirjapali (India)
- Coordinates: 20.32°N 83.38°E
- Country: India
- State: Odisha
- District: Kalahandi

Population (2001)
  - Total: 2,500

Languages
  - Official: Oriya
- Time zone: UTC+5:30 (IST)
- Postal code: 766012
- Vehicle registration: OD
- Website: odisha.gov.in

Sirjapali is a village of the Kesinga in Kalahandi district of Indian state Odisha. The Tel river flows just 2 km from the village.
