= Sonepur Assembly constituency =

Constituency of the Odisha legislative assembly in India

Coordinates: 20.84°N 83.90°E

Sonepur
- Constituency No. 65 for the Odisha Legislative Assembly

Constituency details
- Country: India
- Region: East India
- State: Odisha
- Division: Northern Division
- District: Subarnapur
- Lok Sabha constituency: Bolangir
- Established: 1951
- Total electors: 2,56,007 (Note: as on 2024) (Note: as data published by election commission)
- Reservation: None

Member of Legislative Assembly
- 17th Odisha Legislative Assembly
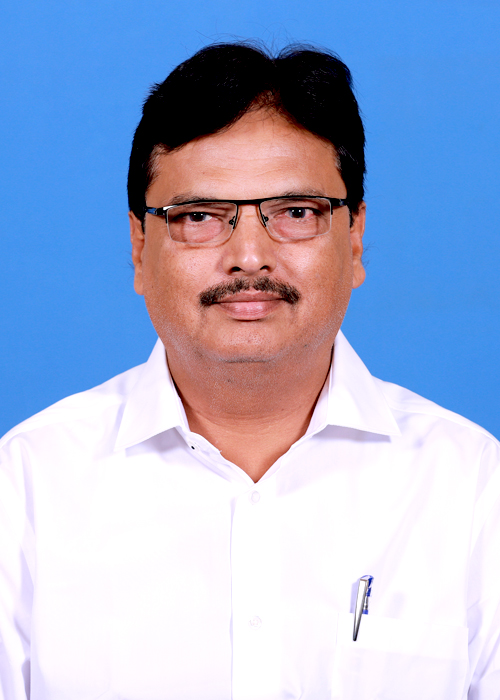
- Incumbent Niranjan Pujari
- Party: Biju Janata Dal
- Elected year: 2024

Sonepur is a Vidhan Sabha constituency of Subarnapur district, Odisha.

This constituency includes Sonepur, Tarbha, Sonepur block, Tarbha block, Dunguripali block and two GPs (Julunda and Mahada) of Binika block.

== Elected members ==
Vote share of winning candidates
2024	46.03%
2019	48.78%
2014	51.70%
2009	42.09%
2004	48.11%
2000	42.26%
1995	37.56%
1990	49.61%
1985	62.37%
1980	66.23%
1977	49.32%

Since its formation in 1951, 17 elections were held till date. It was a 2 member constituency in 1957.

Elected members from the Sonepur constituency are:

Year	Member	Party
2024	Niranjan Pujari	Biju Janata Dal
2019	Niranjan Pujari	Biju Janata Dal
2014	Niranjan Pujari	Biju Janata Dal
2009	Niranjan Pujari	Biju Janata Dal
2004	Binod Patra	Indian National Congress
2000	Kunduru Kushal	Biju Janata Dal
1995	Kunduru Kushal	Janata Dal
1990	Kunduru Kushal	Janata Dal
1985	Achyuta Biswal	Indian National Congress
1980	Dhaneswar Kumbhar	Indian National Congress (I)
1977	Debaraj Seth	Janata Party
1974	Daulat Bagh	Swatantra Party
1971	Nilambar Raiguru	Swatantra Party
1967	Nilambar Raiguru	Swatantra Party
1961	Daulata Ganda	Swatantra Party
1957 (Note: It was a 2 member constituency)	Anantaram Nanda	Ganatantra Parishad
1957	Daulata Ganda	Ganatantra Parishad
1951	Anantaram Nanda	Ganatantra Parishad

== Election results ==
=== 2024 ===
Voting were held on 20th May 2024 in 2nd phase of Odisha Assembly Election & 5th phase of Indian General Election. Counting of votes was on 4th June 2024. In 2024 election, Biju Janata Dal candidate Niranjan Pujari defeated Bharatiya Janata Party candidate Pramod Kumar Mahapatra by a margin of 15,239 votes.

2024 Odisha Vidhan Sabha Election,Sonepur
Party	Candidate	Votes	%	±%
BJD	Niranjan Pujari	98,202	46.03	
BJP	Pramod Kumar Mahapatra	82,963	38.88	
INC	Priyabrata Sahu	20,508	9.61	
NOTA	None of the above	1,905	0.89	
Majority		15,239	7.15	
Turnout		2,13,366	83.34	
BJD hold				

=== 2019 ===
In 2019 election, Biju Janata Dal candidate Niranjan Pujari defeated Bharatiya Janata Party candidate Ashok Kumar Pujari by a margin of 25,726 votes.

2019 Odisha Legislative Assembly election: Sonepur
Party	Candidate	Votes	%	±%
BJD	Niranjan Pujari	99,073	48.78	
BJP	Ashok Kumar Pujari	73,347	36.11	
INC	Chittaranjan Mishra	23,326	11.48	
NOTA	None of the above	1,597	0.79	
Majority		25,726	12.67	
Turnout		2,03,103	81.12	
BJD hold				

=== 2014 ===
In 2014 election, Biju Janata Dal candidate Niranjan Pujari defeated Bharatiya Janata Party candidate Pramod Kumar Mahapatra by a margin of 51,485 votes.

2014 Vidhan Sabha Election, Sonepur
Party	Candidate	Votes	%	±%
BJD	Niranjan Pujari	93,534	51.7	▲8.58
BJP	Pramod Kumar Mahapatra	42,049	23.24	▼2.15
INC	Sarbeswar Purohit	35,795	19.79	▼2.78
BSP	Bimala Naik	2,408	1.33	▼0.36
AOP	Amareswar Mishra	1,686	0.93	
API	Giridhari Khura	1,480	0.82	
SKD	Nandighosh Meher	1,192	0.66	
NOTA	None of the above	2,756	1.52	−
Majority		51,485	28.46	
Turnout		1,80,900	78.1	5.24
Registered electors		2,31,614		
BJD hold				

=== 2009 ===
In 2009 election, Biju Janata Dal candidate Niranjan Pujari defeated Bharatiya Janata Party candidate Nabakrushna Danta by a margin of 28,307 votes.

2009 Vidhan Sabha Election, Sonepur
Party	Candidate	Votes	%	±%
BJD	Niranjan Pujari	68,844	43.12	
BJP	Nabakrushna Danta	40,537	25.39	−
INC	Jitendra Patnaik	36,044	22.57	−
Majority		28,307	17.73 (Note: %of total valid votes)	−
Turnout		1,59,681	72.86	−
BJD gain from INC				
