= Mitrabhanu Gountia =

Folk song composer

- Born: 17 March 1942 (age 83); Sambalpur, India
- Occupation: Folk song composer
- Years active: 1957-present
- Known for: Rangabati

Mitrabhanu Gountia (born 17 March 1942) is a retired teacher and the composer of the Sambalpuri cult song, Rangabati. In 2020, he was conferred with the Padma Shri by the President of India, Ram Nath Kovind.

== Life ==
Born on 17 March 1942 in the Bilunga village of the Sambalpur district in Odisha, Gountia began to write satires from the age of 15 with songs such as parikhya chinta and masa udusa kali. His folk songs were aired at the Sambalpur radio station of the All India Radio on the Sur Malika program for the first time in 1978; they were sung by Jitendra Haripal and Krishna Patel. He composed the eponymous Rangabati song in the Sambalpuri language soon after; it was recorded in 1979 by P. Majumdar, a Kolkata-based music album producer, leading to its worldwide popularity.

The retired teacher penned over 1000 folk songs. Mandakini manar juli, jharamali nani, tetel patar saru saru, kane chabe kana kuturu, and tui nuru thile nurinuri miun are some of his popular folk songs.

== Recognition ==
- Padma Shri Award (2020)
- Odisha State Teachers Award (2003)
- Odisha Sangeet Natak Akademi Award
- Akashvani National Award
