= Kosaleswara temple =

Hindu Temple in Odisha, India

Kosalesvara temple or Kosaleswara temple located at Baidyanatha of Subarnapur district, Odisha, India. In the balcony of the brick-built jagamohana hall of this temple a peculiar Kirtimukha head is carved on brick. From the mouth of this kirtimukha a bunches of leaves are flowing down. Such arts are found carved on the Laksmanesvara temple located at Sirpur of the Chhattisgarh state, which was built in 8th century.

== See also ==
- Kosalananda Kavya
- Subarnameru Temple
- Patali Srikhetra
