= Tarbha =

- Town
- Location in Odisha, India Tarbha (India)
- Coordinates: 20.43°N 83.40°E
- Country: India
- State: Odisha
- Region: Western Odisha
- Division: Sonepur
- District: Subarnapur (or Sonepur)

Government
  - Body: Notified Area Committee, Tarbha
  - Chairman: Ms.Monika lal Agrawala
- Elevation: 130 m (430 ft)

Population (2011)
  - Total: 8,334

Languages
  - Official: Odia
  - Local: Sambalpuri

Ethnicity
  - Ethnic groups: Sindhi, Marwari
- Time zone: UTC+5:30 (IST)
- PIN: 767016
- Telephone code: 916654
- Vehicle registration: OD 31 (previously OR 31)
- Nearest city: Balangir (20km)
- Sex ratio: 1000:974 ♂/♀
- Literacy: 74%
- Civic agency: Notified Area Committee, Tarbha
- Website: odisha.gov.in

Tarbha (also known as Tarabha, sometimes called "Ulta Bharat" or Opposite India) is a Notified Area Council in Subarnapur district in the Indian state of Odisha.

== Demography ==
As of 2012 India census, Tarbha had a population of 12,886. Males constitute 51% of the population. Tarbha has an average literacy rate of 68%, higher than the national average of 59.5%: male literacy is 78% and female literacy is 58%. 12% are under 6. Tarbha is a Block, Police Station, Tahashil, Panchayat and NAC.
