= Bhagirathi Nepak =

Indian writer

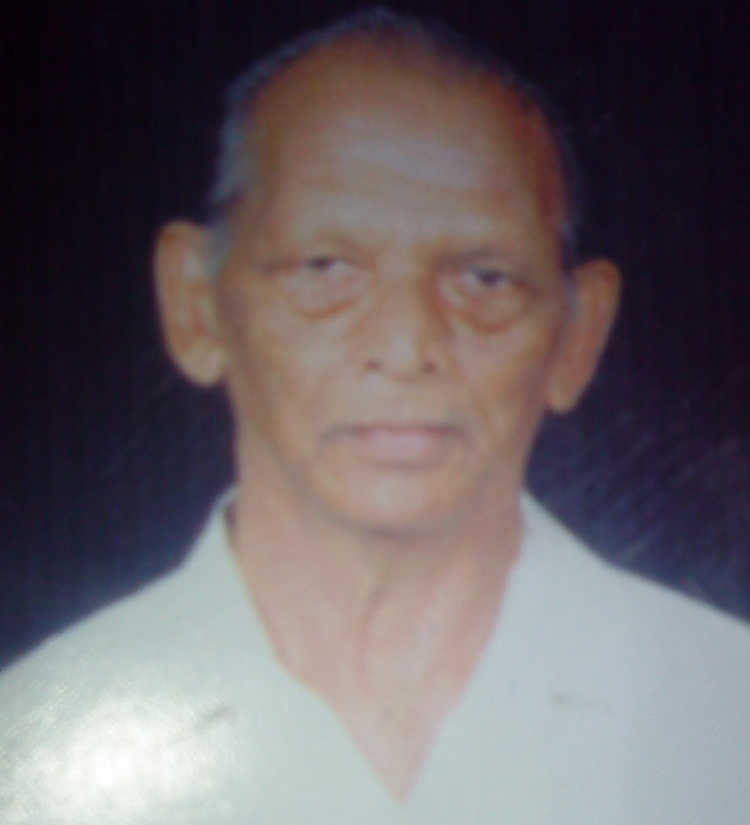
- Born: 1 April 1931; Binika, Sonepur, Odisha, India
- Died: 3 January 2007 (aged 75); Bhubaneswar
- Education: BA Philosophy
- Alma mater: Gangadhar Meher College
- Spouse: Anusuya nepak
- Children: Manorama, Rajendra, Nirupama, Debendra, Suvendra, Pratima, Narendra
- Writing career
- Language: Odia
- Notable awards: Odisha Sahitya Akademi

Bhagirathi Nepak (1 April 1931 – 3 January 2007) was an eminent scholar on Mahima Dharma and Bhima Bhoi, and well known Odisha Sahitya Akademi award-winning writer.

== Early life ==
He was born to Late Sadananda Nepak and Late Shreemati Devi at Binika of Sonepur District. But later his family moved to Lachhipur village of Subarnapur district. After finishing his graduation in Philosophy from Gangadhar Meher College, Sambalpur, he joined as an auditor in the Government of Odisha.

He started writing with the "Kau O Koili" during his school days. Later he penned many books including Research books, Novels, Short Stories, Poetry etc. Till date more than 229 of his creations are published which include 34 novels, 3 collections of poems, many biographies, children literature, short plays. He is remembered for popularizing Satya Mahima Dharma.

Some of his creations are:

- Odisha ra Adibasi (The tribals of Odisha)
- Bhima Bhoi O Anyanya Prasanga (Bhima Bhoi and other)
- Punarabrutti - (Repeatation) a Novel
- Suchana - (Information/Notice) a Novel
- Patel Badhu Jaikadhi - a Novel
- Kali, Aji, Paradina - (Yesterday, Today and Tomorrow) - a Novel
- June Teyis Sujata ra Swapna - (The 23rd June) - A Novel
- Sujata ra Swapna - (The dreams of Sujata) - A novel
- Katha Bichitra - A bucket of short stories
- Chira Sabuja Galpa - (Evergreen stories) - Short Stories
- Chira Nutana Galpa - (Ever new Stories) - Short Stories
