= Baghahandi =

Coordinates: 21.064435°N 83.643948°E

Baghahandi is a village in Subarnapur district, Orissa, India, covering an area of 794 acres (321 ha) and with a population (2001 census) of 1088 in 243 households. The village has a school and an Anganwadi centre.
