= Binika =

- Town
- Location in Odisha, India Binika (India)
- Coordinates: 21.03°N 83.8°E
- Country: India
- State: Odisha
- District: Subarnapur
- Elevation: 122 m (400 ft)

Population (2001)
  - Total: 14,537

Languages
  - Official: Odia
- Time zone: UTC+5:30 (IST)
- Postal code: 767019
- Vehicle registration: OD-31
- Website: odisha.gov.in

Binika (also known as Binka) is a town and a notified area council in Subarnapur district in the state of Odisha, India.

== Geography ==
Binika is located at 21.03°N 83.8°E. It has an average elevation of 122 metres (400 feet).

== Demographics ==
As of 2001 India census, Binika had a population of 14,537. Males constitute 51% of the population and females 49%. Binika has an average literacy rate of 63%, higher than the national average of 59.5%; with male literacy of 75% and female literacy of 50%. 13% of the population is under 6 years of age.

== Politics ==
MLAs who represented Binka Assembly Constituency are Padmanav Behera of BJD (2009-2014 and 2014-2019), Niranjan Pujari of BJD, who won the seat in State elections of 2004 and also in 2000. Previous MLAs from this seat include Narasingha Mishra of JD who won this seat in 1995, Chitiaranjan Mishra of INC in 1985, Pradip Hota of INC(I) in 1980, and independent candidate Parakhita Karna in 1977.

Binka is part of Bolangir (Lok Sabha constituency).
