= Satya Narayan Bohidar =

Indian writer

Satya Narayan Bohidar (1 August 1913 – 31 December 1980) was a Sambalpuri writer. He was a pioneer of Sambalpuri language and grammar.

== Life ==
Bohidar was born in a Karan family at Sonepur, Orissa, India. His formative and creative years were spent in Sambalpur and produced a good number of literary translations and biographies. Bohidar was successful in preparing a dictionary and grammar in Sambalpuri, which provided a significant identity to Sambalpuri society.

== Books ==
- Ṭikcaham̐rā (1975)
- Sambalapurī bhāshāra sabda-bibhaba: bā, Saṃkshipta Sambalapurī byākaraṇa o racanā (1977)
