= Sonepur State =

Former princely state of British India

Coordinates: 20.83°N 83.92°E

Sonepur State Sonpur State
- Princely State of British India
- 1650–1948
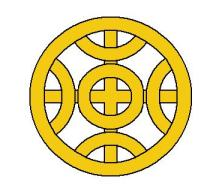
- Coat of arms

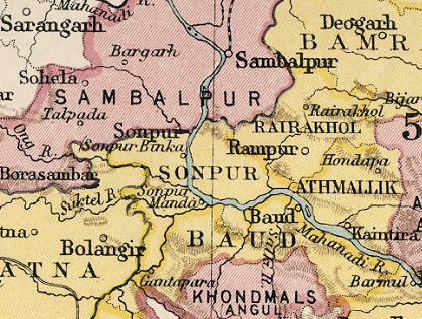
- Sonepur State in the Imperial Gazetteer of India
- Capital: Subarnapur
- Area
  - 1901: 2,347 km^{2} (906 sq mi)
- Population
  - 1901: 169,877
- History
  - Established: 1650
  - Accession to the Union of India: 1948
Succeeded by
India

Sonepur, also known as Sonpur State, was one of the princely states of India during the period of the British Raj. Its ruler was entitled to a nine-gun salute. Formerly it was placed under the Central India Agency, but in 1905 it was transferred to the Eastern States Agency. Its capital was Sonepur, the only significant town in the area. The former state's territory is in the present-day Subarnapur district, Western Odisha.

== History ==
The Sonepur state was founded in 1650 when the fourth Chauhan ruler of Sambalpur Madhukar Dev, conquered the region from the Bhanja rulers of Boudh and entrusted it to his younger son Madan Gopal who hence became the founder of the Chauhan dynasty branch of Sonepur.

The state came under the control of the British Empire post the Maratha defeat and later king Niladhar Singh Deo was awarded titles for services rendered to the British during the Sambalpur uprising.

After Indian independence, Sonepur's last ruler acceded to the newly independent Dominion of India, on 1 January 1948 with the state forming much of the present-day Subarnapur district.

== Rulers ==
=== Ruling Chiefs of Sonepur ===
Ruling Chiefs of Sonepur
Name	Date of birth	Reign began	Reign ended	Date of death
Madan Gopal Singh Deo		1650	1680	
Lal Sai Singh Deo		1680	1689	
Purusottam Singh Deo		1689	1709	
Raj Singh Deo		1709	1729	
Achal Singh Deo		1729	1749	
Divya Singh Deo		1749	1766	
Jarawar Singh Deo		1766	1767	
Sobha Singh Deo		1767	1781	
Prithvi Singh Deo		1781	1841	
Niladhar Singh Deo	1838	27 July 1841	9 September 1891	
Pratap Rudra Singh Deo	22 July 1853	9 September 1891	8 August 1902	
Bir Mitrodaya Singh Deo	8 July 1874	8 August 1902	29 April 1937	
Sudhansu Shekhar Singh Deo	23 August 1899	29 April 1937	10 August 1963	

=== Titular ===
Titular Chiefs of Sonepur
Name	Date of birth	Reign began	Reign ended	Date of death
Bir Pratap Singh Deo	31 July 1923	10 August 1963	28 December 1971 (deposed)	24 November 1972
Prithvi Bir Singh Deo		24 November 1972		

== See also ==
- Eastern States Agency
- Political integration of India
