= Chaturbhuj Meher =

Indian weaver (born 1935)

- Born: 13 October 1935 (age 90); Sonepur, Odisha, India
- Occupation: Weaver
- Known for: Tie-dye handloom weaving
- Awards: Padma Shri; Odisha State Award; Chinta O Chetana National Award; Viswakarma Award; Priyadarshini Award
- Website: mehersonline

Chaturbhuj Meher is an Indian weaver, considered one of the master weavers of the Tie-dye handloom tradition of Odisha. Born on 13 October 1935 at Sonepur in Odisha, he had formal education only up to school level but learned the traditional weaving craft to join Weavers' Service Centre as a Weaver. Vayan Vihar, a handloom factory and Handloom Research and Training Center, a research institute in Sonepur have been founded by him and he is known to have trained over 10,000 craftsmen.

Aishwarya Rai, former Miss World and Bollywood actor is reported to have worn one of Meher's Sonepuri Sari creations on her wedding day, gifted by her mother-in-law, Jaya Bachchan. He has twice been given the Odisha State Award, in 1991 and 1995, in addition to awards such as Chinta O Chetana National Award (1992), Viswakarma Rashtriya Puraskar (1997) and Priyadarshini Award (2005). The Government of India awarded him the fourth-highest civilian honour of the Padma Shri, in 2005, for his contributions to the Indian handloom sector.
