= Rangabati =

Sambalpuri Odia-language song

"Rangabati" is perhaps the most popular recorded song in Sambalpuri Odia. Krishna Patel, a 2023 Padma Shri awardee, is the female singer while the male singer Jitendra Haripal is a 2017 Padma Shri awardee. The song was first recorded for All India Radio in the mid-1970s. A record company from the then Kolkata, Indian Record Manufacturing Company Ltd (INRECO), re-recorded the song in 1976. The disc release was delayed due to a dispute and finally released in 1978–79. The Sambalpuri song was written by Mitrabhanu Gauntia, composed by Prabhudatta Pradhan and sung by Jitendra Haripal and Krishna Patel. In the 1970s and 1980s, the song gained popularity for being commonly played in marriage processions and Murti immersion. The song gained official recognition when it was played in the tableau of Odisha as part of the Republic Day celebrations at New Delhi in 2007. The lead singer Jitendra Haripal was also felicitated by Odisha Chief Minister Naveen Patnaik later that year. It was also notably used in the celebration of victory during an international cricket match in Barabati Stadium, Cuttack.

== In popular culture ==
"Rangabati" is popular in Odisha and most parts of West Bengal, Bihar, Jharkhand, Andhra Pradesh, and Chhattisgarh. This song is also to be released in Chinese. During the 7th World Water Forum at Daegu in South Korea, Korean dancers danced ecstatically to the tune of the song. "Rangabati" was recreated in many other languages of India and has been recreated in Telugu for a movie called Sreeram. The song is featured in Bollywood movie Kaun Kitne Paani Mein directed by Nila Madhaba Panda. The song was remade by composer Ram Sampath featuring Sampath himself, Sona Mohapatra, and Rituraj Mohanty for MTV India's Coke Studio Season 4. Nigerian singer Samuel Singh released a cover version of the song.

== Copyright controversy ==
Protests erupted on social media and in Western Odisha after the telecast of "Rangabati" remix on MTV Coke Studio on 5 July 2015, claiming that the telecast of this song did not attribute it to the original composer, Prabhudatta Pradhan, nor acquire permission from the copyright holder beforehand. Earlier on the same day, a legal notice with a damage claim of 1 crore Indian Rupees was sent through the Supreme Court of India to Hindustan Coca-Cola Beverages, Viacom18 Media, Sona Mohapatra, Ram Sampath and Rituraj Mohanty for copyright infringement. The petitioner also requested the court to stop the telecast of this remixed song on MTV.
