= Dungripali railway station =

Railway station in Odisha, India

Dungripali

General information
- Location: Dungripali, Odisha; India
- Coordinates: 21°03′41″N 83°33′34″E
- System: Indian Railway Station
- Owner: Ministry of Railways, Indian Railways
- Line: Jharsuguda–Vizianagaram line
- Platforms: 2
- Tracks: 2

Construction
- Structure type: Standard (On Ground)
- Parking: No

Other information
- Status: Functioning
- Station code: DJX
- Zone(s): East Coast Railway
- Division(s): Sambalpur
Location
- Location within India Location within Odisha

Dungripali railway station is a railway station on the East Coast Railway network in the state of Odisha, India. It serves Dungripali village. Its code is DJX. It has two platforms. Passenger, Express and Superfast trains halt at Dungripali railway station.

== Major Trains ==
- Puri - Durg Express
- Ispat Express

== See also ==
- Subarnapur district
