= Parbati Giri =

Indian independence activist (1926 – 1995)

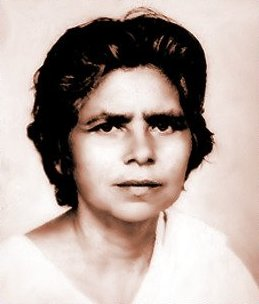
- Born: 1926; Sambalpur, Odisha
- Died: 1995 (aged 68–69)

Parbati Giri (19 January 1926 – 17 August 1995), daughter of Dhananjay Giri. Nicknamed the Mother Teresa of Western Odisha, was a prominent female freedom fighter from Odisha, India. The women freedom fighters of Odisha played a significant role in the Indian Freedom Struggle.

Due to her anti-British government activities, she was imprisoned for two years. Parbati Giri was just 16 when she was in the forefront of agitation following Mahatma Gandhi's "Quit India" call. She continued to serve the nation socially after independence. She opened an orphanage at Paikmal village and devoted rest of her life for the welfare of orphans.

== Early life ==
Giri was born in Samlaipadar village near Bijepur of the present Bargarh district and undivided Sambalpur district on 19 January 1926.

She dropped out after class three and began traveling from village to village, campaigning for the Congress. In 1938, when she was 12, senior Congress leaders at a meeting in Samlaipadar tried to convince her father to allow her to work for the Congress. As a young girl, she travelled to Bari Ashram. Parbati learned many things at the Ashram, including handicrafts, the philosophy of Ahimsa and Self Reliance.

== Working for congress ==
Her uncle Ramchandra Giri was a congress leader and Samlaipadar village was an important place of gathering for the nationalists. She was influenced to work as a freedom fighter, since she would sit in and listen to the meetings held with her uncle. In 1940 Parbati began travelling for the Congress to Bargarh, Sambalpur, Padampur, Panimara, Ghens and other places. She trained villagers, teaching them how to spin and weave khadi. From 1942 she campaigned for the 'Quit India' Movement and was arrested many times, but since she was a minor the police had to release her. She was finally arrested when she invaded the SDO's office at Bargar. She was sentenced to two years’ rigorous imprisonment at Sambalpur Jail. At Bargarh Court she staged an agitation to persuade the lawyers to boycott the court in defiance of the British.

== Life post independence ==
After Independence she completed her schooling at the Prayag Mahila Vidyapitha in Allababad in 1950. Four years later she joined Rama Devi (q.v.) in her relief work. In 1955 she joined an American project to improve the health and hygiene of the people of Sambalpur district. She started an ashram for women and orphans called the Kasturba Gandhi Matruniketan at Nrusinghanath, and another home for the destitute called Dr. Santra Bal Niketan at Birasingh Gar under Jujomura block in Sambalpur District. She worked in jail improvement and leprosy eradication. The Department of Social Welfare of the government of India awarded her a prize in 1984.

== Accolades ==
1. Honorary Doctorate by Sambhalpur University- by the Governor of Orissa, Shri C. Rangarajan in 1998.

2. Mega Lift Irrigation Scheme named after Parbati Giri.- December 2016
