= Sonepuri =

Related to Sonipur, Odisha, India

Sonepuri is a term refers to the various things from Sonepur region of Odisha. Sonepuri handloom, Sonepuri saree and Sonepuri Ganga Jamuna Gamuchha (cloth) are popular among people of Odisha and India. Loosely, the people of Sonepur district are called Sonepuria.
