= Niranjan Pujari =

Indian politician

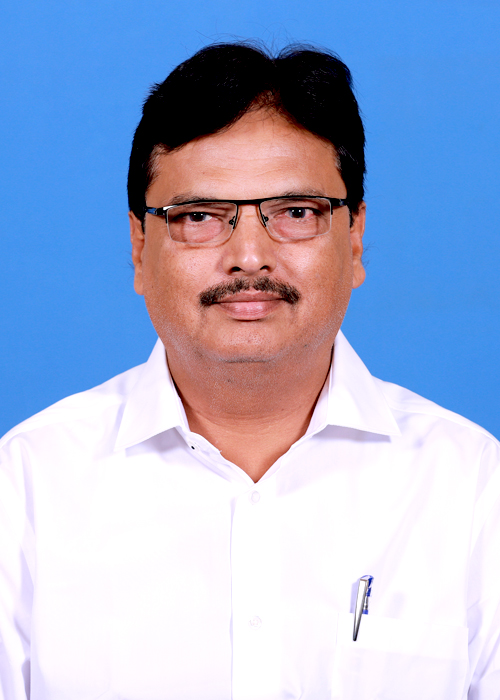

Cabinet Minister Government of Odisha
- In office 29 May 2019 – 11 June 2024
- Chief Minister: Naveen Patnaik
- Ministry and Departments: Excise; Finance; Health & Family Welfare; Parliamentary Affairs

Member of Odisha Legislative Assembly
- Incumbent
- Assumed office 2009
- Preceded by: Binod Patra
- Constituency: Sonepur
- In office 2000–2009
- Constituency: Binka

Speaker of Odisha Legislative Assembly
- In office 26 May 2014 – 6 May 2017
- Preceded by: Pradip Kumar Amat
- Succeeded by: Pradip Kumar Amat

Personal details
- Born: 31 January 1961 (age 64)
- Political party: Biju Janta Dal
- Spouse: Binapani Pujari
- Children: 2 Daughters
- Parent: Radhashyam Pujari (father)

Niranjan Pujari (born 1961) is a member of the Odisha Legislative Assembly, the state assembly from Sonepur of the Indian state Odisha. He was serving as Cabinet Minister of Parliamentary Affairs, Health & Family Welfare in Government of Odisha.
