= Sonapur, Jhapa =

Sonapur, Nepal सोनापुर
- Village
- Location in Nepal
- Coordinates: 26.647°N 87.733°E
- Country: Nepal
- Zone: Mechi Zone
- District: Jhapa District
- Time zone: UTC+5:45 (Nepal Time)

Sonapur is a village in the Topgachchi VDC in the Jhapa district in Nepal.

== Sources ==
- "Army Map Service (RMBM) - Edition 1-AMS, series U502, NG 45-7 Kishanganj". www.lib.utexas.edu.
