= Sonipur =

Sonipur is the smallest village of the Gandhinagar district in Gujarat. It is located 10km west of the city Gandhinagar. Kolavada, Sardhav, and Rupal are the neighbour villages of Sonipur. Address of Sonipur is : At- Sonipur, Po-Rupal, T & D - Gandhinagar, Pin Code - 382630.

The population of Sonipur is around 3,500. There are only four castes in Sonipur : Prajapati, Thakor, Patel, and Dantani.
