= Bomkai sari =

Handloom sari from Odisha, India

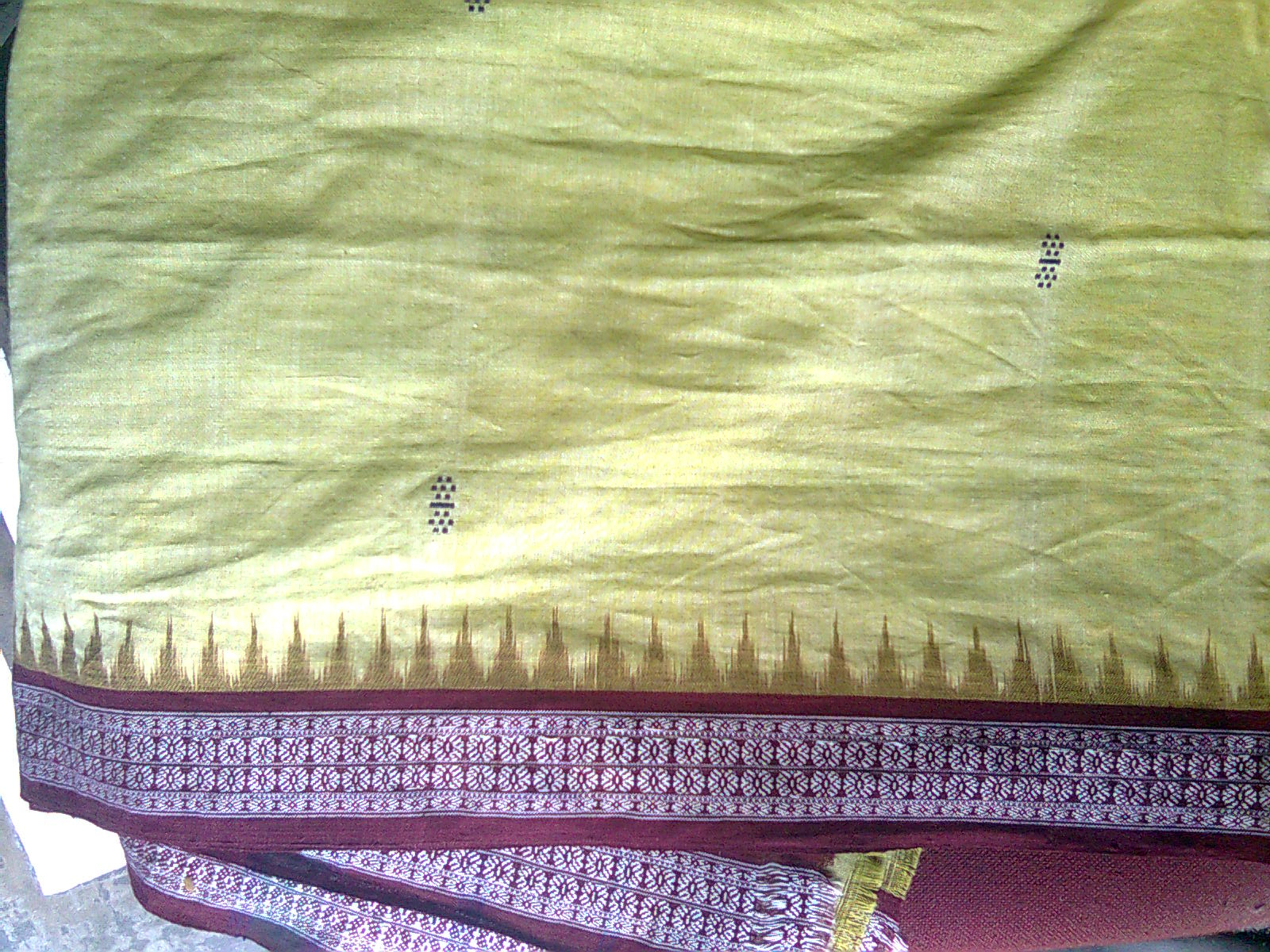
Bomkai saree or Sonepuri Saree

Bomkai sari or Bomkai Saree is a handloom saree from Odisha, India. It is an origin of Bomkai village from Ganjam district, however later it is mainly produced by the Bhulia community of Subarnapur district. Bomkai is one of the identified Geographical Indications of India. Bomkai Sarees are popular items displayed at various fashion shows.

== Description ==
Bomkai - Modern in Design with Traditional Tinge Bomkai cotton sarees are mostly accepted for habitual wear and the silk sari is put on ceremonies and sacred occasions. Most of the stylish saree are embodied with captivating color to give the gracious look to the woman wearing the saree. The ancient belief is depicted in its border Mostly the design of fish is seen in the sari as it is believed to be a sign of success and affluence. The most charming part is its threadwork in the designs of the border and the palloo. The appearance of the saree is related to simplicity and has a tribal tinge in it. The sari is normally dyed to attain the red, black and white background colours. However, today you will find the sari in several designs and multiple colours while retaining their originality. The warps are suitably woven to produce multicoloured end piece. Some of the designs especially include- Lotus, Temple(Mandir), Square type of patterns, Tortoise, etc.

== History ==
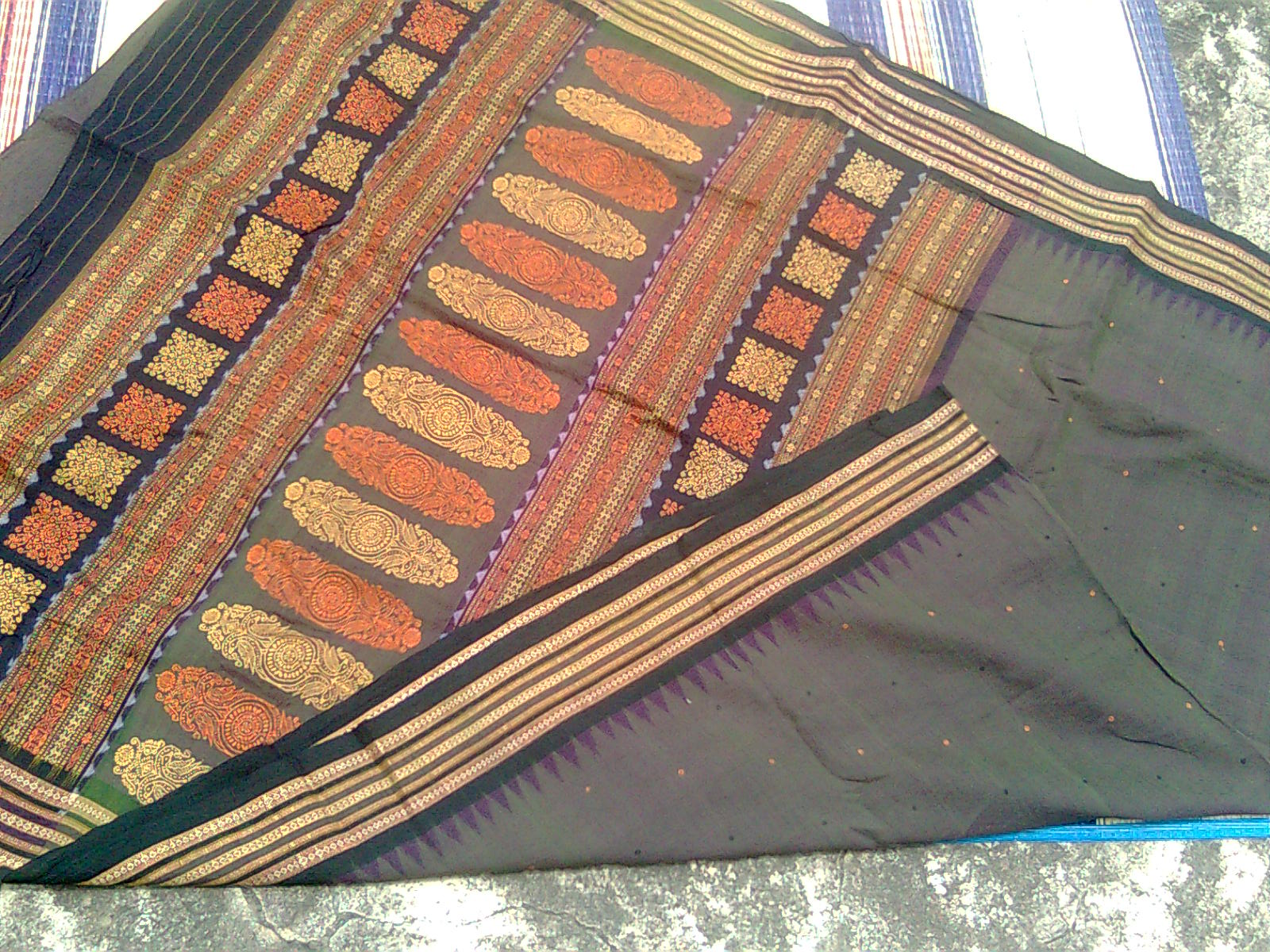
Bomkai saree

Bomkai sari originated in the village of Bomkai in Ganjam district of Odisha. During the time of Ramai Dev, the then ruler of Patna, it was introduced in Sonepur.

== Materials Used ==
Cotton yarns of 10s to 40s counts were used in earlier days. However, at present, fine cotton yarns (2/80, 2/100, 2/120s), mulberry silk, tussar silk, zari, etc. are being used extensively.

== Technique ==
Fly shuttle pit looms as well as frame looms are used. 3 shuttle technique is used to get solid border effect, locally called “Muhojorha saree”. Extra warp design in border, and extra weft design in body and pallu, are woven with the help of a dobby/jacquard/jala.

== Trivia ==
Aishwarya Rai wore a kind of bomkai called "Radhakunja" during her wedding with Abhishek Bachchan designed by Chaturbhuj Meher of Sonepur.

== Recognition ==
The world-famous Bomkai got a GI(Geographical Indication)Tag in 2009, means it is original only if made in Bomkai(Ganjam) and Sonepur.
