= Jitendra Haripal =

Jitendra Haripal ଜିତେନ୍ଦ୍ର ହରିପାଳ
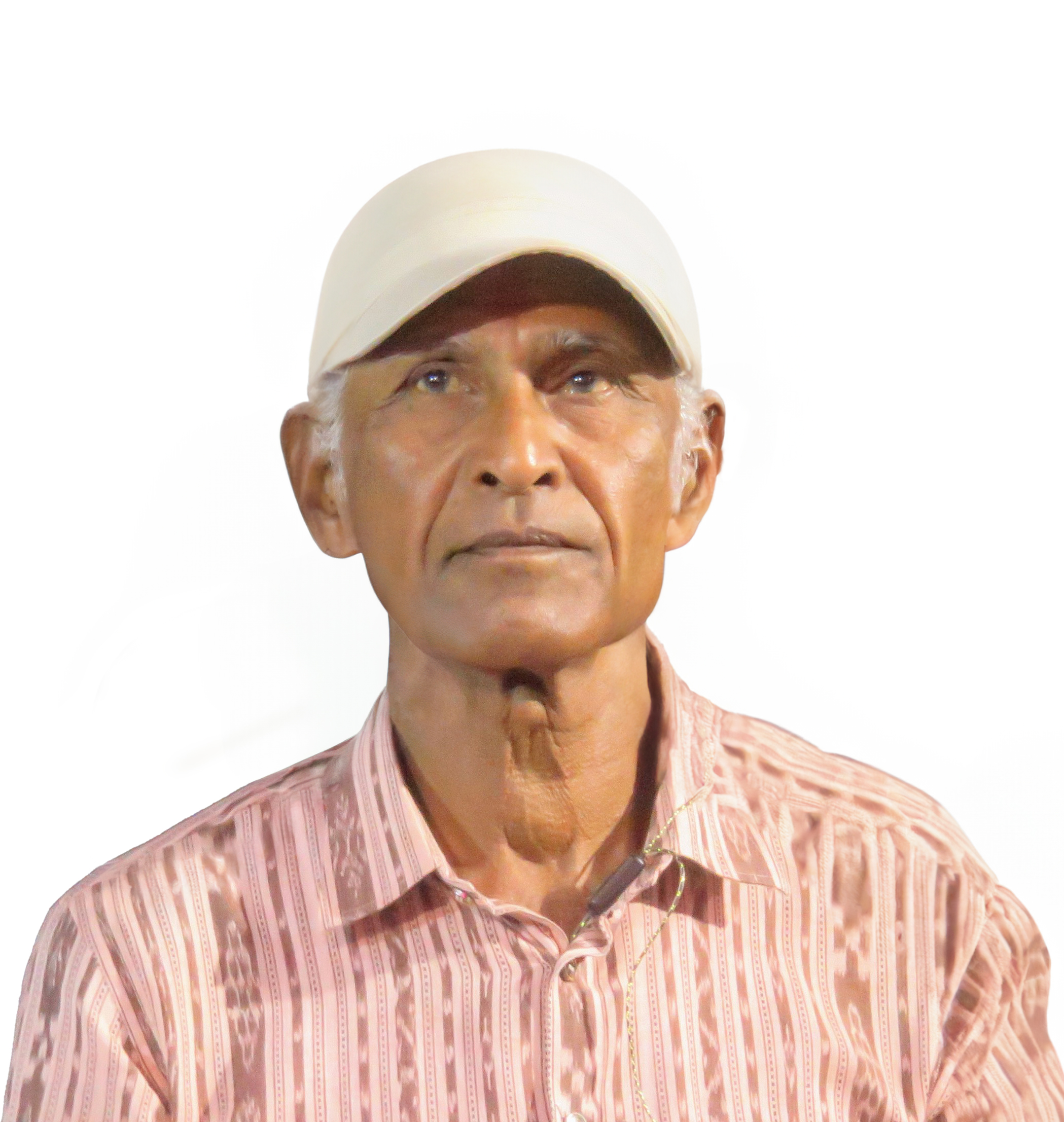
- Jitendra Haripal in Sambalpur

Background information
- Genres: Indian pop
- Occupation: Singer
- Instrument: Vocal
- Years active: 1971–present

Jitendra Haripal (or Jitendria Haripal), a singer, is most popularly known for his voice in the famous and super hit Rangabati Song in Sambalpuri language of Odisha. He sang this duet song with his female co-singer Krishna Patel. He has sung over 1000 songs and regarded as a top exponent of Sambalpuri language song . He has shared the stage with other leading artists of the State including the former Chief Minister Giridhar Gamang, himself a fine musician. He received the Padma Shri, the fourth highest civilian award of India from the Government of India in 2017 for his contribution to the Indian Music.

== Personal life ==
Haripal dropped out of school and has never taken formal training for songs. He has borrowed this skill from his father Mandhata Haripal, who was a talented musician himself. Being very poor, he could not afford a teacher. His family was landless. They have the only property as singing. In an interview to The Hindu he says, "I know the raagas but not their titles, It is only when people tell me that the song you have sung is in this or that raaga that I get to know the names".

== Professional life ==
According to him, "Music is not safe source of earning". Hence he has worked as a construction labourer and did other odd jobs some time.

He started his career as a singer in All India Radio (AIR) in 1971 and worked as a "Senior B High" grade as an artist. In the 70s he became popular because of Rangabati Song. After being a hit number on AIR, in 1976 the song got recorded again in Kolkata by a music company, INDRECO. A dispute over authorship of the tune stopped the release of the disc. Finally he won in the legal battle in courts and the disc was released in 1978–79.

He subsequently faced contractual difficulties. Owing to the song's popularity, the cassette company signed him for three years with the option of a two-year extension. The company later went into lockout, closed, and was transferred to new ownership. Under the terms of his contract, he could not perform for other labels, and his royalties stopped; he received only around ₹10,000. He was supported by Satyanarayan Mohanty of Jharsuguda, who drew the attention of the Government of Odisha to the matter of monthly honoraria for Padma awardees.

Although he rose to fame because of the Rangabati Song, which was in pure Sambalpuri dialect, he has not restricted himself to Sambalpuri folk music only. He used to listen folk music from everywhere. He is a musician who understands and sings folk songs of various dialect such as Sambalpuri (Kosli Language, Bhojpuri, Odia, Chhattisgarhi and Dhakia Bengali music.

== Public reception ==
According to one account, a crowd that recognised him at Batapur railway station refused to allow the train to depart until he sang Rangabati; the driver eventually asked him to sing a few lines so that the train could continue its journey.

== Family ==
His youngest son Prabhat is a well-known percussionist and his daughter-in-law Minu is a popular singer. His granddaughter Ghungroo loves folk dances.

Even after being in lime light, in 2001, his family was not in good financial condition. Their family troupe used to make little money. They lost all their instruments in heavy rain and used to hire or borrow.

== Contribution for upliftment of Sambalpuri folk music ==
In April 2015, Haripal submitted a petition to secretary, tourism and culture, Aurobinda Padhi seeking his intervention to ensure that folk songs retain their original glory. He does not like the obscene and vulgar lyrics in Sambalpuri folk songs now-a-days and wants to censor the video albums.

== Awards and felicitations ==
- Jitendra Haripal and Krishna Patel were conferred with DLitt (Honoris Causa) at the fourth convocation of Utkal University of Culture in Bhubaneswar on 10 April 2015.
- In 2007, he was felicitated by Odisha Chief Minister Naveen Patnaik.
- In 2012, he was the brand ambassador for Western Samurai, Rourkela T-20 team for the Odisha Premier League.
- In 2017, the prestigious "Padma Shri" was conferred upon him
