= Kosalananda Kavyam =

Kosalananda Kavyam is a Sanskrit work written on a palm-leaf manuscript in Odia script, in 1663 CE by Pandit Gangadhara Mishra. The work is an important epic of Sanskrit literature about the history of Chauhan rule in Western Odisha region. Pandit Mishra was the court poet of Sambalpur King Baliarsingh Deva (1650–89 CE). He was born at Biraramchandrapur sasana of Puri and was the descendant of Sambhukara and Vidyakara, scholars and poets of Puri.

== See also ==
- Patna State
- Sambalpur State
- Sonepur State
