= Lankeswari Temple =

Coordinates: 20.849305°N 83.914306°E

Lankeswari temple
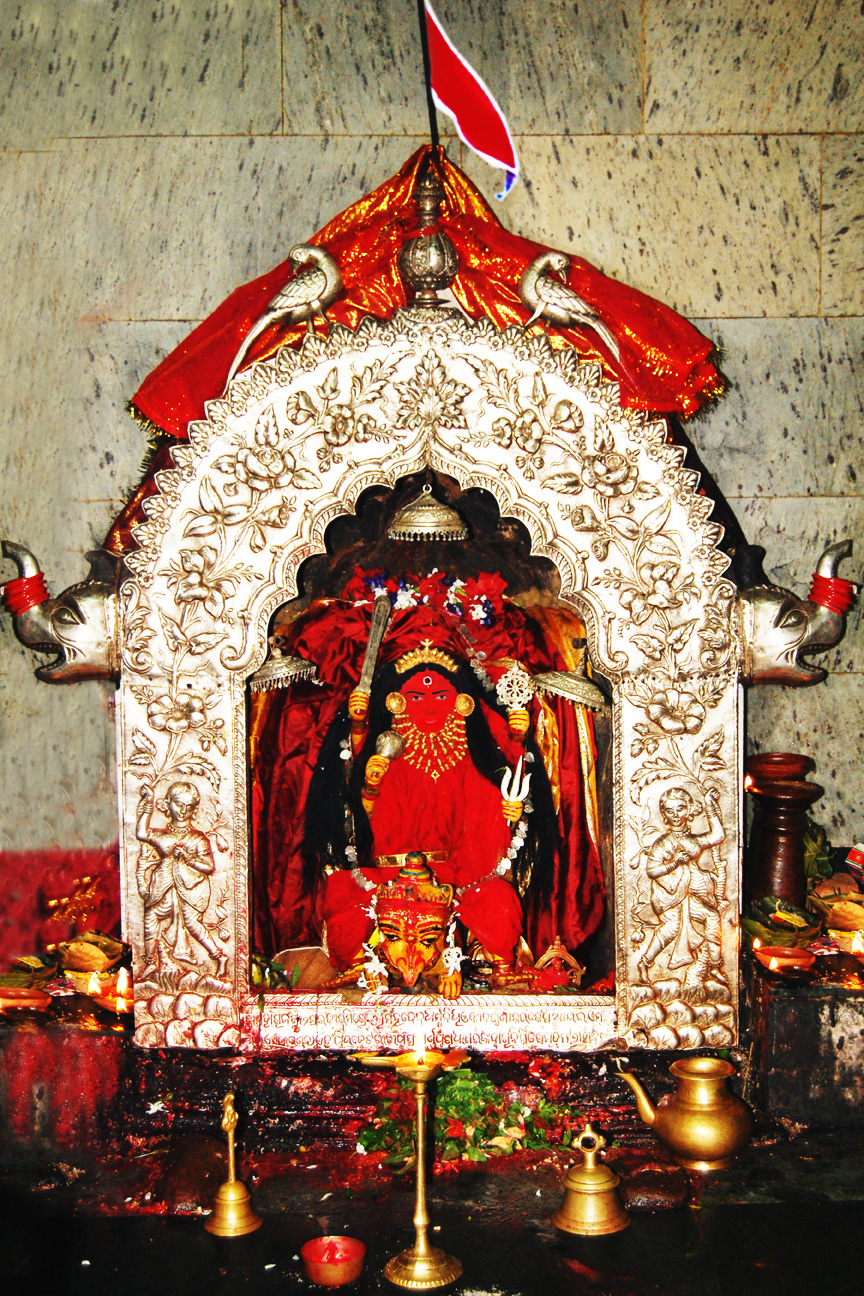

Religion
- Affiliation: Hinduism
- District: Subarnapur district
- Deity: Goddess Lankeswari or Nikumbhilaa

Location
- Location: Inside the river Mahanadi at Sonepur town
- State: Odisha
- Country: India
- Interactive map of Lankeswari temple

Lankeswari temple is located inside the river Mahanadi at Sonepur town, Subarnapur district, Odisha, India. Once upon a time Sonepur region was known as Paschima Lanka. Goddess Lankeswari or Nikumbhilaa was the presiding deity of Paschima Lanka. Now Maa Lankeswari is worshiped by the Kaibarta community of Sonepur and people of Subarnapur district. One can see this temple while travelling on the road connecting Ulunda, Dharmasala, Sonepur and Birmaharajpur.
