= Patali Srikhetra =

Coordinates: 21.060391°N 84.032613°E

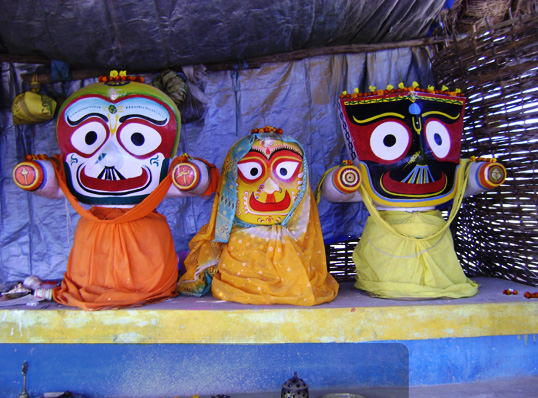

Religion
- Affiliation: Hinduism
- District: Subarnapur district
- Deity: Shaktism, Buddhism and Vaishnavism

Location
- Location: foot of Trikut Hill at Kotsamalai of the Birmaharajpur subdivision
- State: Odisha
- Country: India
- Interactive map of Patali Srikhetra

Patali Srikhetra is a famous place with significant historical importance for Subarnapur district and Odisha, India. This religious place is associated with Shaktism, Buddhism and Vaishnavism. It is located in the foot of Trikut Hill at Kotsamalai of the Birmaharajpur subdivision of Subarnapur district, Odisha, India. It is widely believed that the idol of Lord Jagannath, Balabhadra and Devi Subhadra were kept hiding in the caves of the Trikut for a period of 144 years.

== Raktavahu and Patali Srikhetra ==
The Madalapanji describe that during the invasion of Raktavahu, a king named Sovanadeva of Odisha escaped with the images of Lord Jagannath, Balabhadra and Devi Subhadra. He then reached Sonepur and buried the images at a place called Sonepur-Gopali. After 144 years, a king name Yayati Keshari of Somavamsi dynasty got the images and made new images. He built a temple at Puri and enshrined the idols.

== Archaeological evidence ==
Subsequently, Archaeological Survey of India team led by Dimiri and State Archaeology led by B. K. Ratha paid a visit and testified the linkage of Patali Srikhetra with Srikhetra and also found archaeological properties of pre-historic importance.
