= Subarnameru Temple =

Coordinates: 20.833673°N 83.914368°E

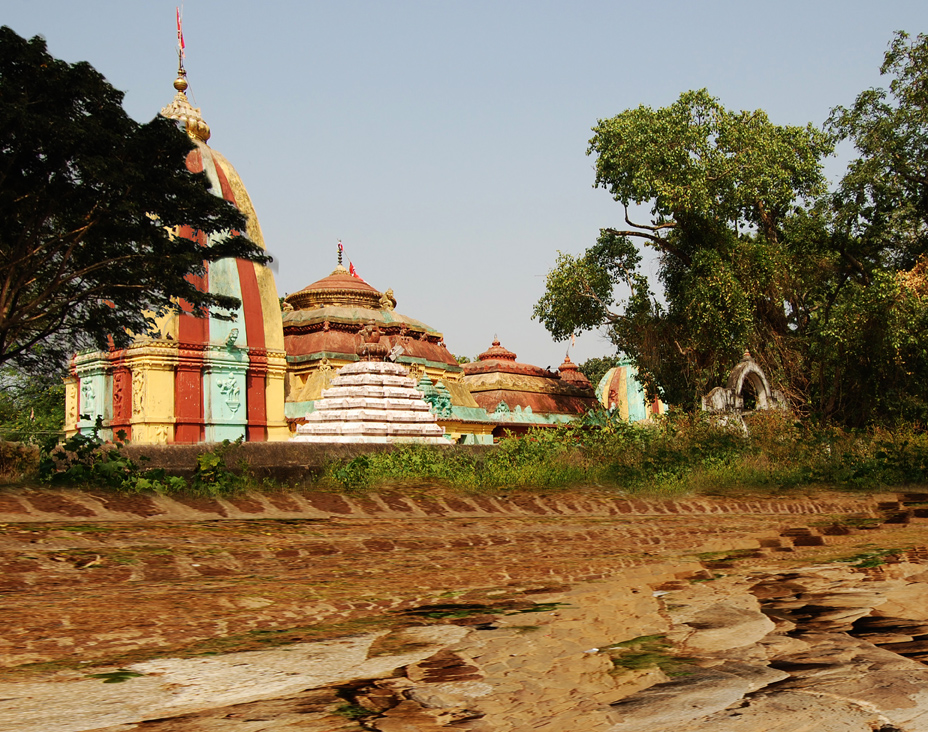
- Subarnameru temple

Religion
- Affiliation: Hinduism
- District: Subarnapur district
- Deity: Lord Shiva

Location
- Location: Sonepur
- State: Odisha
- Country: India

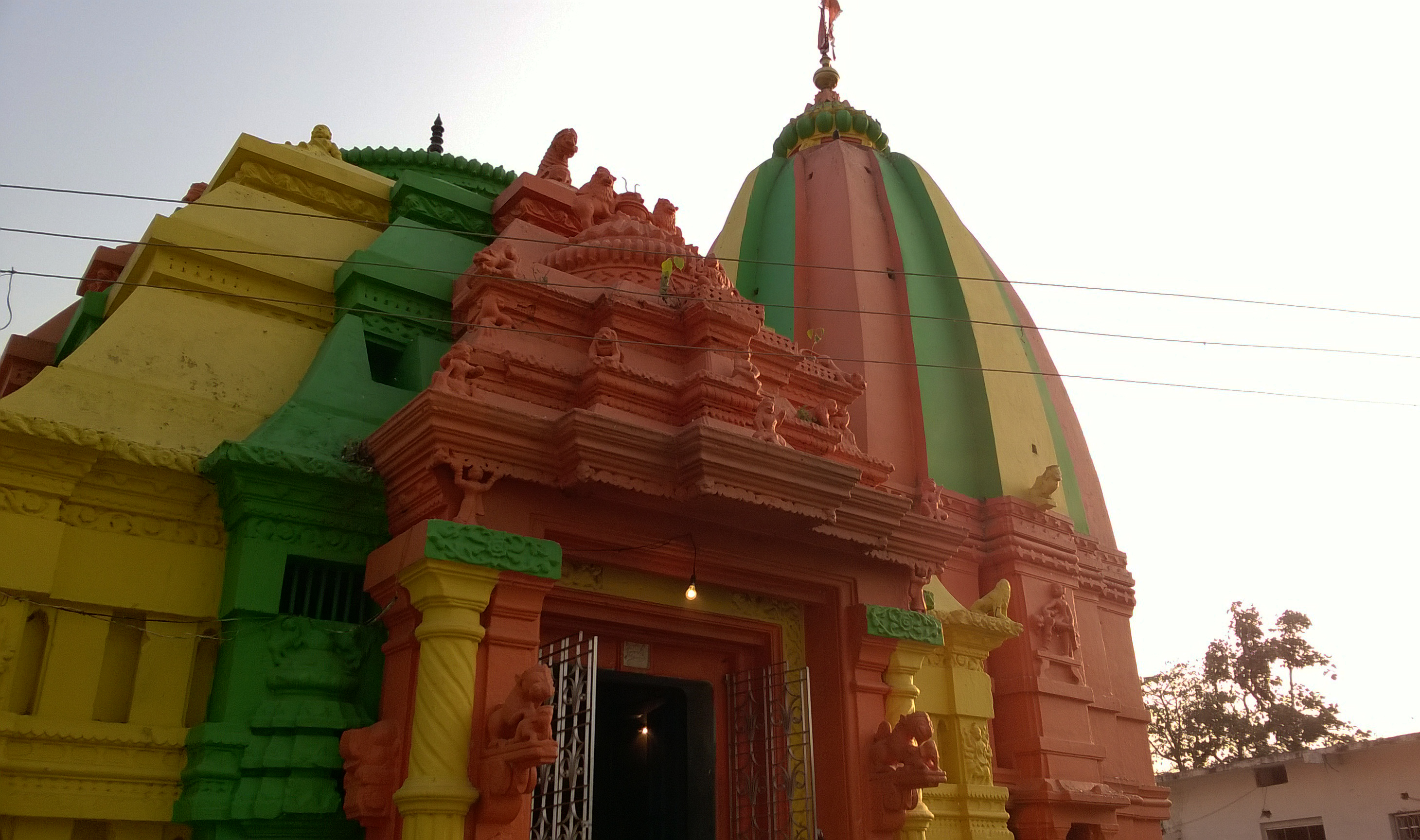
Subarnameru temple Sonepur

Subarnameru Temple is situated in Sonepur town in Subarnapur district of Odisha, India. It is a shrine for the worshipping of Shiva and commonly known as Second Varanasi of India.

== Legend ==
Popular story of Gold Coin Rain is associated with this place, with this temple when an ardent devotee asked lord for help, so the name is Sonepur or Subarnapur. The place attracts thousands of visitors and pilgrimages. This temple is situated just on the bank of Tel River. Major festivals are Shivaratri and Kartik Purnima.

== Transport ==
Sonepur is well connected to nearest railhead Sonepur. By road regular bus services are there from Bhubaneswar.Cuttack, Berhampur, Sambalpur.
