= Tel River =

River in India

Coordinates: 20°50′N 83°54′E

The Tel river flows in Nabarangpur, Kalahandi, Balangir, Boudh Sonepur District of Odisha, India. Tel is an important tributary of the Mahanadi. It flows just eight kilometers away from the town of Titilagarh. This significant tributary of the Mahanadi river meets the main river at Sonepur or Subarnapur. The convergence of the two rivers offers a remarkable view against a colorful landscape. Baidyanath temple, which is famous for the Kosaleshwar Shiva temple, is located on the left bank of the Tel River.

== Source ==
The Tel river originates in plain and open country in the Nabarangpur district of Odisha (Close to Odisha-Chhattisgarh border) near Amravati forest range. It is the largest tributary of the Mahanadi river.
