= Subarnapur district =

Subarnapur district Sonepur district
- District of Odisha
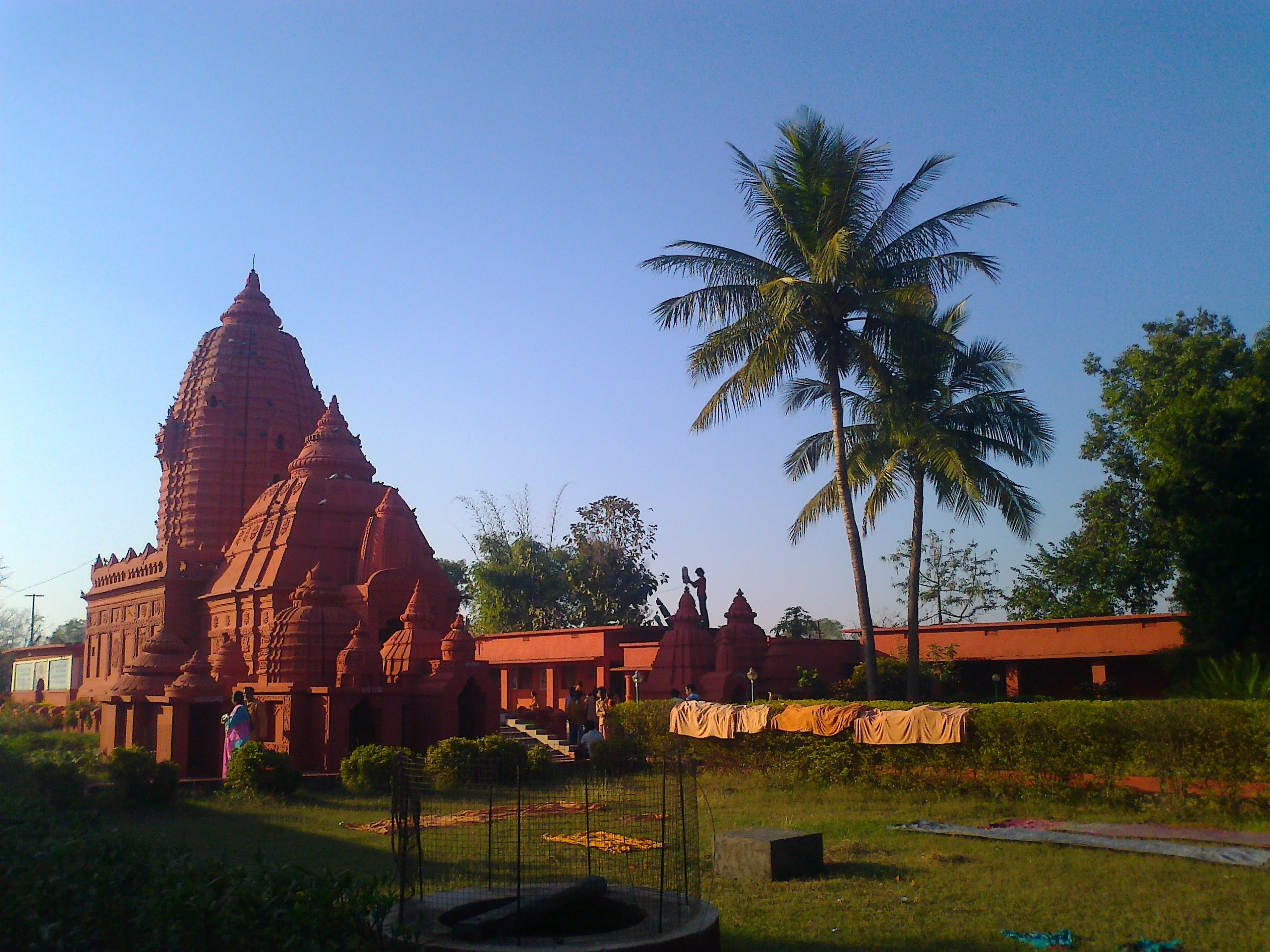
- Nickname: City of Temples & Crafts
- Location in Odisha
- Subarnapur district
- Coordinates: 20.85°N 83.9°E
- Country: India
- State: Odisha
- Region: Western Odisha
- Established: 1 April 1993; 33 years ago
- Headquarters: Subarnapur

Government
  - Collector & District Magistrate: Dr Nruparaj Sahu
  - Superintendent of Police: Amaresh Panda, OPS

Area
  - Total: 2,337 km^{2} (902 sq mi)

Population (2011)
  - Total: 610,183
  - Density: 261.1/km^{2} (676.2/sq mi)

Languages
  - Official: Odia, English
  - Local: Sambalpuri
- Time zone: UTC+5:30 (IST)
- PIN: 767 xxx
- Telephone code: +91 665x
- Vehicle registration: OD 31
- Nearest city: Balangir
- Sex ratio: 1000:966 ♂/♀
- Literacy: 64.07%
- Lok Sabha constituency: Bolangir
- Vidhan Sabha constituency: 064-Birmaharajpur (SC); 065-Sonepur
- Climate: Aw (Köppen)
- Precipitation: 1,443.5 millimetres (56.83 in)
- Avg. annual temperature: 30 °C (86 °F)
- Avg. summer temperature: 45 °C (113 °F)
- Avg. winter temperature: 24 °C (75 °F)
- Website: www.subarnapur.nic.in

Subarnapur district, also called Sonepur district, is an administrative district in Odisha state in eastern India. The city of Sonepur is the district headquarters. Sonepur is known as the Mandiramalini town (city of temples) of Odisha with more than hundred temples. The people of the Sonepur region are referred to as Sonepuria. From ancient times, Sonepur is considered as a holy city.

== History ==
In the 8th century CE, the region was known as Swarnapur and was ruled by vassal lords of the Bhaumkaras of Tosali. The region was then ruled by the Somavamsis and eventually became one of two capitals of the Somavamsis. Around the 10th and 11th centuries, the region was called Pashima Lanka or Western Lanka. The evidence for these names comes from a Somavamsi prince of the region called Kumara Someswaradeva who issued a copper plate charter in the late 10th century which identified him as the ruler of Paschima Lanka. Historically, the presiding deity of the region was the goddess Lankeswari. At some point during Somavamsi rule, the region was given its current name, Subarnapur. It was formally established as a district in 1993.

== Economy ==
In 2006 the Ministry of Panchayati Raj named Subarnapur one of the country's 250 most backward districts (out of a total of 640). It is one of the 19 districts in Odisha currently receiving funds from the Backward Regions Grant Fund Programme (BRGF).

== Divisions ==
- Sub-divisions: Sonepur and
- Tehsils: Sonepur, Binika, Rampur, Birmaharajpur, Tarbha, and Ullunda
- Blocks: Sonepur, Binika, Tarbha, Dunguripali, Birmaharajpur and Ullunda
- Municipality: Sonepur
- N.A.C.: Tarbha, Binika, Dunguripali, Birmaharajpur

== Demographics ==
Historical population
Year	Pop.	±% p.a.
1901	117,731	—
1911	164,230	+3.38%
1921	189,687	+1.45%
1931	211,684	+1.10%
1941	229,296	+0.80%
1951	241,413	+0.52%
1961	274,515	+1.29%
1971	322,578	+1.63%
1981	397,386	+2.11%
1991	476,815	+1.84%
2001	541,835	+1.29%
2011	610,183	+1.20%

According to the 2011 census, Subarnapur district has a population of 610,183, roughly equal to the nation of Montenegro or the US state of Vermont. The district is the 512th most populous in India out of a total of 640. The district has a population density of 260 inhabitants per square kilometre (670/sq mi). Its population growth rate over the decade of 2001–2011 was 20.35%. Subarnapur has a sex ratio of 959 females for every 1000 males, and a literacy rate of 74.42%. 8.18% of the population lives in urban areas. Scheduled Castes and Scheduled Tribes make up 25.60% and 9.37% of the population respectively. Hinduism is the predominant religion, practiced by 99.19% of the population.

Languages of Subarnapur district (2011)
1. Sambalpuri (59.7%)
2. Odia (39.3%)
3. Others (1.03%)

At the time of the 2011 Census of India, 59.67% of the population in the district spoke Sambalpuri and 39.30% Odia as their first language.

== Culture ==
Subarnapis home to a wide variety of cultural heritage, arts, and crafts. The Sonepur area specializes in textiles and terracotta, Tarbha and Binka produce brass metal works, Ullunda is home to a tradition of stone carving, and Dunguripali produces Paddy crafts.

Subarnapur is home to the poet and prophet Mahima Dharma. The district is also known for "Danda-nata", a religious folk tradition which is native to the area.

=== Temple town, Sonepur ===
- Paschima Lanka
- Lanka Podi
- Sasisena Kavya
- Sasisena Temple
- Sureswari Temple
- Subarnameru Temple
- Lankeswari Temple

=== Tourist attractions ===
- Mahima pitha, Khaliapali
- Gyaneswar Baba Shiv temple and museum at Kenjhiriapali village
- Metakani Temple, Ullunda
- Patali Srikhetra, Kotsamlai
- Rushyashrunga hill at Goudgad jungle
- Papakshya Ghat, Binka
- Kapileswar temple, Charda
- Nabagrahakunda
- Rameswar Shiva Temple
- Lord Sri Sri Swapneshwar Temple, Goudgad of BirmaharajPur Block.
- Thengo Irrigation Project of Birmaharajpur Block
- Maa Umadevi Temple and Siddheswar Temple
- Maa Ramachandi & Baba Raneswar Temple, Telanda
- Gupteswar Baba Temple, Gailmura
- Bhimtangar, Gailmura
- Baunsa Bana, Dunguripali
- Maa pudapat temple Tulunda, Tarbha
- Chudakhai Dangar Tulunda panchayat, Tarbha
- Nua Brundaban(Gulunda Matha)binka
- Gordhaneswara Baba temple (At- near of khamaar, Bir maharajpur)
- Champeswara Baba temple (At-Champamal, Bir maharajpur)
- Chandramani Matha (At-Bagbar, Bir maharajpur)

=== Saree ===
- Sonepuri Pata Saree
- Sonepuri Saree
- Sambalpuri Saree

=== Notable people ===
- Ananda Hota astronomer and founder of RAD@home Astronomy Collaboratory
- Bhagirathi Nepak, Odia Eminent Writer
- Chaturbhuj Meher master weaver, awarded with Padma Shri
- Kailash Chandra Meher, painter awarded the Padma Shri.
- Nila Madhab Panda, film maker and director of I Am Kalam.
- Sabyasachi Mohapatra, Odia film director and producer.
- Satya Narayan Bohidar Writer, Linguist

== Education in Subarnapur district ==
=== Schools ===
- Jawahar Navodaya Vidyalaya, Tarbha
- Sri Aurobindo Shikshyakendra, Goudgad
- Ganapati Adarsha Shikshya Niketan, Biramaharaj Pur
- Swami Vivekananda Adarsha Vidyalaya, Khandahata
- Anchalik Uchha Vidya Pitha, Kenjhiriapali
- Centurion Public School, Dunguripali
- Saraswati Shishu Mandir, Dunguripali
- Saraswati Shishu Mandir, Rampur
- Sahara Trust High School, Sonepur
- Vishwabharti Chintan Shikshya Niketan, Sonepur
- St Anne's Convent School, Sonepur
- Saraswati Shishu Mandir, Sonepur
- Sri Aurobindo Integral Education & Research Center, Sonepur
- Odisha Adarsha Vidyalaya, Sonepur
- Bhimabhoi Vidyapita, Lachhipur
- Saraswati Shishu Mandir, Lachhipur
- Odisha Adarsha Vidyalaya,Tarbha

=== Colleges ===
- Sonepur College, Sonepur-Raj
- Model Degree College, Subarnapur
- Shree Ram College, Rampur
- Dunguripali College, Dunguripali
- Gram Panchayat College, Lachhipur
- Buddhiram College, Menda
- Birmaharajpur College Birmaharajpur
- Siddhartha college, Binka
- Bagbar Women's College, Bagbar (Birmaharajpur)
- AES College, Tarbha

== Politics ==
This district is a part of Balangir Lok Sabha co Govt. ITI, Biramaharajpur, Subarnapur Govt. ITI, Sonepur Govt Polytechnic, Sonepur Govt ANM training college, Subarnapur Subarnapur nursing college, Sonepur nstituency. The MP of Balangir is Sangeeta Kumari Singh Deo from the BJP.

=== Vidhan Sabha Constituencies ===
The following are the two Vidhan sabha constituencies of Subarnapur district and the elected members of each area.

No.	Constituency	Reservation	Extent of the Assembly Constituency (Blocks)	Member of 17th Assembly	Party
64	Birmajarajpur	SC	Ulunda, Birmaharajpur, Binka (NAC), Binika (part)	Raghunath Jagadala	BJP
65	Sonepur	None	Sonepur, Tarabha, Tarabha (NAC), Sonepur (M), Dunguripali, Binka (part)	Niranjan Pujari	BJD

== Villages ==
- Baghahandi

== See also ==
- Kosalananda Kavya
