= Western Odisha =

Western part of the Indian state of Odisha

Coordinates: 20.58°N 84.47°E

Western Odisha (also known as Paschim Odisha) is the western part of the state of Odisha in India, extending from the Kalahandi district in the south to the Sundargarh district in the north.

== History ==
Historically it has been included within the larger region of Greater Kalinga. Its territory has been ruled by various dynasties, including:

- Mahameghavahana dynasty: 2nd or 1st century BC to early 4th century CE. The primary source is King Kharavela's rock-cut Hathigumpha inscription.
- Gupta Empire
- Bhauma-Kara dynasty
- Somavamshi dynasty: Somavamshi King Janamajaya-I Mahabhavagupta (c. 882–922 CE) consolidated the eastern part of his kingdom comprising the modern undivided Sambalpur and Bolangir districts and established a matrimonial relationship with the Bhauma-Kara dynasty ruling over modern coastal Odisha. After Uddyotakeshari (c. 1040–1065 CE), the Somavamshi kingdom declined gradually. After the decline of the Somavamshis the area came under the Telugu Chodas for a short period. The last Telugu Choda king of south Kosala was Somesvara III, who was defeated by Kalachuri king Jajalladeva-I around 1110 CE.
- Kalachuri Dynasty: Jajalla-deva, a ruler of the Kalachuri dynasty of Ratanpur (the historical capital of Chhattisgarh), defeated the ruler of Sonpur and annexed it to his kingdom in 1110. The region was administered under the Kalachuri rulers of Ratanpur from 1110 to 1238.

== Natural resources ==
The Western Odisha region is rich with minerals. Iron ore is available in plenty at Tensa and Barsuan in Sundargarh district, bauxite is available at Gandhamardan in Bargarh district, and coal is available in Himgir in Sundargarh district and Rampur in Jharsuguda district. Dolomite is available at Dubulabera and Kangorama in Sambalpur district and Lephripada in Sundargarh district. Graphite is available at Patnagarh and Titilagarh in Balangir district. Manganese ore is available in Balangir district. Fireclay is available at Belpahar in Jharsuguda district, Gandawara in Sambalpur district, and some places in Sundargarh district.

== Demographics ==
=== Population ===
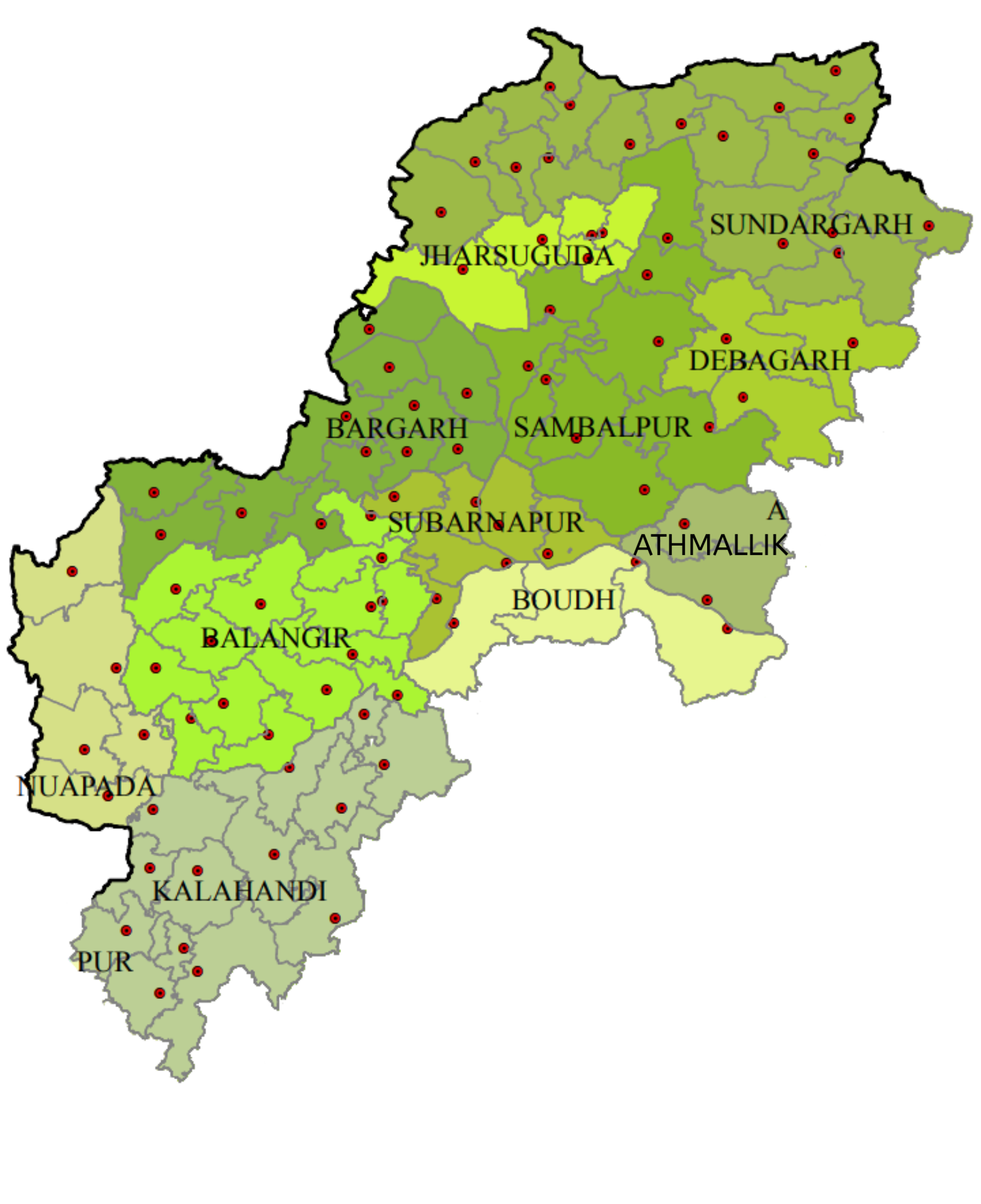
Western Odisha Region

District	District Headquarters	Area (km^{2}.)	Population 1991 Census	Population 2011 Census	Literacy Rate 2011
Balangir	Balangir	6,575	1,230,938	1,648,574	65.50
Bargarh	Bargarh	5,837	1,207,172	1,478,833	75.16
Kalahandi	Bhawanipatna	7,920	1,335,494(population in 2001)	1,576,869	59.22
Nuapada	Nuapada	3,852	469,482	606,490	58.20
Sambalpur	Sambalpur	6,702	809,017	1,044,410	76.91
Subarnapur	Sonepur	2,337	476,815	652,107	74.42
Sundargarh	Sundargarh	9712	2,093,437		

(Source: Population of India, 2011)

In addition to the ten districts listed abovementioned and shown on the map, the Western Odisha Development Council includes Athmallik Sub-Division of Anugul District on its website.

== Art and culture ==
Western Odisha is culturally influenced by several different cults and religions. Its history dates back to the Mahabharat and Buddhist period. Folk songs and dances of this area have been revived and recognized during the last quarter century, including Danda (Danda Yatra and Danda Nata), which is considered to be one of the oldest forms of variety entertainment in India, as well as the modern "Krushnaguru Bhajan", a type of folk lyrics and songs. Sambalpuri songs are quite popular throughout Odisha. Some hits include Rangabati, Ekda Ekda, Dalkhai, and Panbala Babu.

Rangabati is a modern Sambalpuri song inspired by folk music, written in 1975, which enjoyed international popularity in the 1970s and 1980s. It was sung by Jitendra Haripal and Krishna Patel.

There are so many intellectuals from Sambalpur. Gangadhar Meher is a famous poet from the state. Shraddhakar Supakar was a prominent writer and social activist from Sambalpur.

== Notable people ==
- Prasanna Acharya
- Ritesh Agarwal
- Pramod Bhagat
- Krupasindhu Bhoi
- Hemananda Biswal
- Parbati Giri
- Gangadhar Meher
- Sadhu Meher
- Laxminarayan Mishra
- Narasingha Mishra
- Pramod Kumar Mishra
- Sabyasachi Mohapatra
- Haldhar Nag
- Braja Mohan Panda
- Sarat Pujari
- Veer Surendra Sai
- Shraddhakar Supakar
- Dilip Tirkey
- Srinibash Udgata

== Temples ==
- Chari Sambhu Temple
- Harishankar Temple
- Leaning Temple of Huma
- Manikeshwari Temple
- Nrusinghanath Temple
- Maa Sureswari Temple
- Maa Samaleswari Temple
