= Subarnapur, Odisha =

Sonepur Subarnapur
- Town
- Sonepur
- Location in Odisha, India Sonepur (India)
- Coordinates: 20°50′40.503″N 83°54′25.989″E
- Country: India
- State: Odisha
- District: Subarnapur
- Elevation: 121 m (397 ft)

Population (2001)
  - Total: 17,535

Languages
  - Official: Odia
  - Spoken: Sambalpuri
- Time zone: UTC+5:30 (IST)
- PIN: 767017
- Telephone code: 06654
- Vehicle registration: OD-31
- Website: odisha.gov.in subarnapur.nic.in

Sonepur, also known as Subarnapur, is a town and district headquarters of Subarnapur district of Odisha in India. The district spreads over an area of 2284 km^{2}. It is also known as Second Varanasi of India for its cluster of temples having architectural importance and also of tantricism and second Allahabad for the Meeting Point (Sangam) of two rivers Mahanadi and Tel in place just like in Allahabad. Subarnapur is also famous for silk, handloom, prawns, terracotta etc.

== History ==
Sonepur was formerly the capital of Sonepur State, a princely state of British India.

== Demographics ==
As of 2001 India census, Sonepur town had a population of 17,535. Males constitute 53% of the population and females 47%. Sonepur has an average literacy rate of 74%, higher than the national average of 59.5%: male literacy is 82%, and female literacy is 65%. In Sonepur, 11% of the population is under 6 years of age.

== Education ==
- Sonepur College, Sonepur

== Temples of Sonepur ==
- Kosaleswara temple
- Lankeswari Temple
- Manikeswari temple
- Narayani Temple
- Ramachandi Temple
- Samleswari Temple
- Subarnameru Temple
- Sureswari temple

== Notable people ==
- Kailash Chandra Meher, painter, awarded Padma Shri by Govt. of India.

== Sari ==
- Sonepuri Sari

== Politics ==
Current MLA from Sonepur (SC) Assembly Constituency is Niranjan Pujari of BJD, who won the seat in State elections in 2014. Previous MLAs from this seat were Binod Patra of INC, who won the seat in 2004, Kunduru Kushal who won this seat representing BJD in 2000, representing JD in 1995 and in 1990, Achyuta Biswal of INC in 1985, Dhaneswar Kumbhar of INC(I) in 1980, and Debraj Seth of JNP in 1977.

Sonepur is part of Balangir (Lok Sabha constituency).

== Transport ==
Sonepur is well connected by road and railways with the major cities and towns of Odisha.NH 57 passes through this city.NH 126A, State Highway 41 and State Highway 15 in Odisha starts from this city.

•Buses:

Sonepur is well connected to cities like Bhubaneswar, Puri, Cuttack, Berhampur, Sambalpur, Balangir, Keonjhar, Phulbani, Bargarh, Bhawanipatna, Jeypore, Koraput, Nabarangpur, Umerkote, Jharsuguda, Angul, Sundargarh, Bhanjanagar, Khurdha, Nayagarh and many more places with both private and government bus services. It has interstate bus service to Chhattisgarh's Raipur.

•Railways:

Sonepur railway station is a part of the Khurdha-Balangir Railway project and is now well connected to cities like Bhubaneswar, Cuttack, Puri, Sambalpur, Balangir, Bargarh, Rairakhol, Angul, Talcher, Dhenkanal and Jatani also known as Khurdha Road Junction.

•Airways:

Currently, the nearest airport to Sonepur is: Veer Surendra Sai Airport of Jharsuguda 142.5 kilometres (88.5 mi)

== See also ==
- Sonepuri
- History of Sonepur, Odisha
