= Pitha =

Food originating from Indian subcontinent

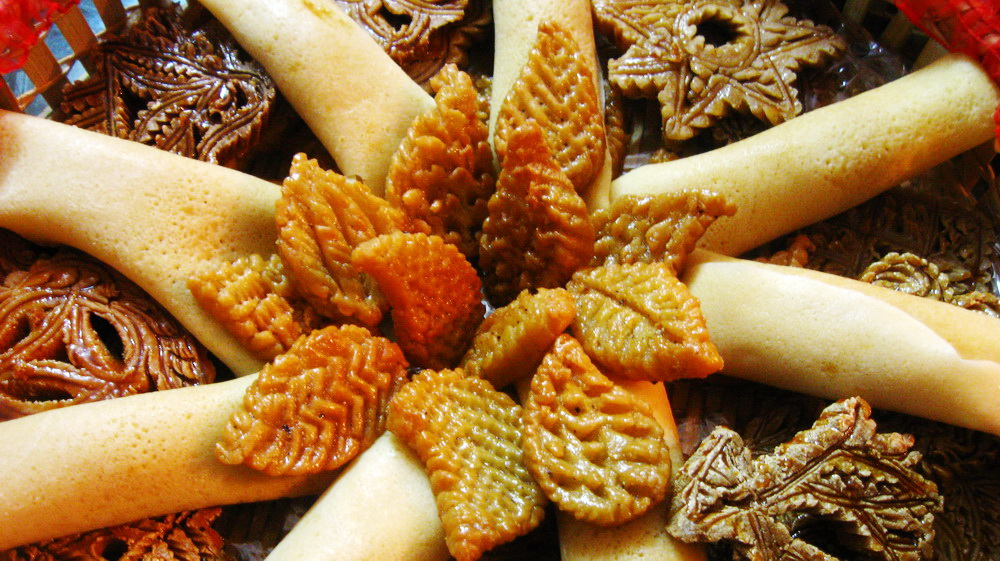
- Varieties of Pitha for a wedding in Bangladesh
- Course: Whole meal, snack or dessert
- Place of origin: Indian subcontinent
- Associated cuisine: Assamese cuisine, Bengali cuisine, Odia cuisine, Bhojpuri cuisine, Jharkhandi cuisine, and Maithili cuisine
- Main ingredients: Rice flour or wheat flour

Pitha (piṭhā; also called piṭhē) are a variety of food similar to pancakes, dumplings or fritters, originating from the eastern part of the Indian subcontinent (i.e., South Asia). Pitha can be sweet or savoury, and usually made from a dough or batter, which is then steamed, fried or griddled. Very few varieties are oven-baked or boiled, and most are unleavened and cooked on a stovetop (or equivalent). Some versions may have a filling, garnish, or sauce. Few may be set or shaped after cooking. They are typically eaten as a snack with chai, or as treats during special occasions (similar to mithai).

Pitha is especially popular in the eastern region of Indian subcontinent, like Bangladesh and Indian states of West Bengal, Bihar, eastern Uttar Pradesh, Odisha, Jharkhand, and the Northeast Indian states, especially Tripura and Assam. Pithas are typically made of rice flour, although there are some types of pitha made of wheat flour. Less common types of pitha are made of palm or ol (a local root vegetable).

== Preparation ==
Pithas are primarily made from a batter of rice flour or wheat flour, which is shaped and optionally filled with sweet or savory ingredients. When filled, the pitha's pouch is called a khōl (literally "container") and the fillings are called pur.

For stuffed vegetable pithas, ingredients such as cauliflower, cabbage, radish, or potato are usually fried, baked, or steamed, and then mashed, cooled, and formed into small balls to stuff into the pithas.

Sweet pithas typically contain sugar, jaggery, date juice, or palm syrup, and can be filled with grated coconut, fried or roasted sesame seeds, cashews, pistachios, sweetened vegetables, or fruits. Sweet pithas are also often flavored using cardamom or camphor.

Depending on the type of pitha being prepared, pithas can be fried in oil or ghee, slow-roasted over a fire, steamed, or baked and rolled over a hot plate.

Pithas are often eaten during breakfast, as a snack with (often with tea), and in dinner or lunch. Although there are many sweet varieties that are reserved for desserts or holidays.

== Different pithas from each region ==
Pithas vary considerably across the regions of the eastern Indian subcontinent.

=== In Odisha ===
In Odisha, pitha are a group of festive preparations, usually prepared on ritual days as part of an Ōṣā or Brata. Pithas are part of the Mahaprasada and are prepared every day by the Mahasuaras in the Roshasala of the Jagannatha Temple, Puri. They have been prepared in the same method for several millennia in the temple kitchen. Several pithas owe their origin to the state. Some common pithas are:

- Enduri pitha (ଏଣ୍ଡୁରି ପିଠା): prepared on Prathamastami with sweetened jaggery and coconut stuffing using turmeric leaves.
- Poda pitha (ପୋଡ଼ପିଠା): a semi-burnt rice-based pitha with coconut that is sweet to taste, offered to Jagannatha in Ratha Jatra.
- Kakara pitha (କାକରା ପିଠା): prepared during most festivals, it consists of deep-fried suji stuffed with rich coconut stuffing.
- Arisa pitha (ଆରିସା ପିଠା): a rice-based pitha topped with sesame seeds, ritually prepared in the month of Margasira during Manabasa Gurubara (Lakhmi Puja). Long ago, two merchants from Odisha named Tapassu and Bhallika devised this dish and offered it to the Buddha himself as a token of respect from their land.
- Manda pitha (ମଣ୍ଡା ପିଠା): a steamed pitha stuffed with coconut and jaggery mix, prepared for most festivals, including Manabasa Gurubara and Kumara Purnima.
- Sarsatia pitha (ସରସତିଆ ପିଠା‌): a crispy sweet pitha made using arua and resin from twigs of the Ganjer tree. Popular in Western Odisha.
- Chakuli pitha (ଚକୁଳି ପିଠା): a flat rice pitha resembling pancake, one of the few non-sweet pithas of Odisha
- Chitau pitha (ଚିତଉ ପିଠା): resembles chakuli, but has a different texture and thickness. Prepared on Chitalagi Amabasya.
- Chandrakanti pitha (ଚନ୍ଦ୍ରକାନ୍ତି ପିଠା‌‌): a deep-fried pitha made of green gram and rice flour. Prepared on Dipabali.
- Gaintha pitha (ଗଇଁଠା/ଗଇଣ୍ଠା ପିଠା): rice flour dough balls soaked in thickened cardamom flavoured milk. Prepared on Bakula Amabasya.
Pithas of Odisha

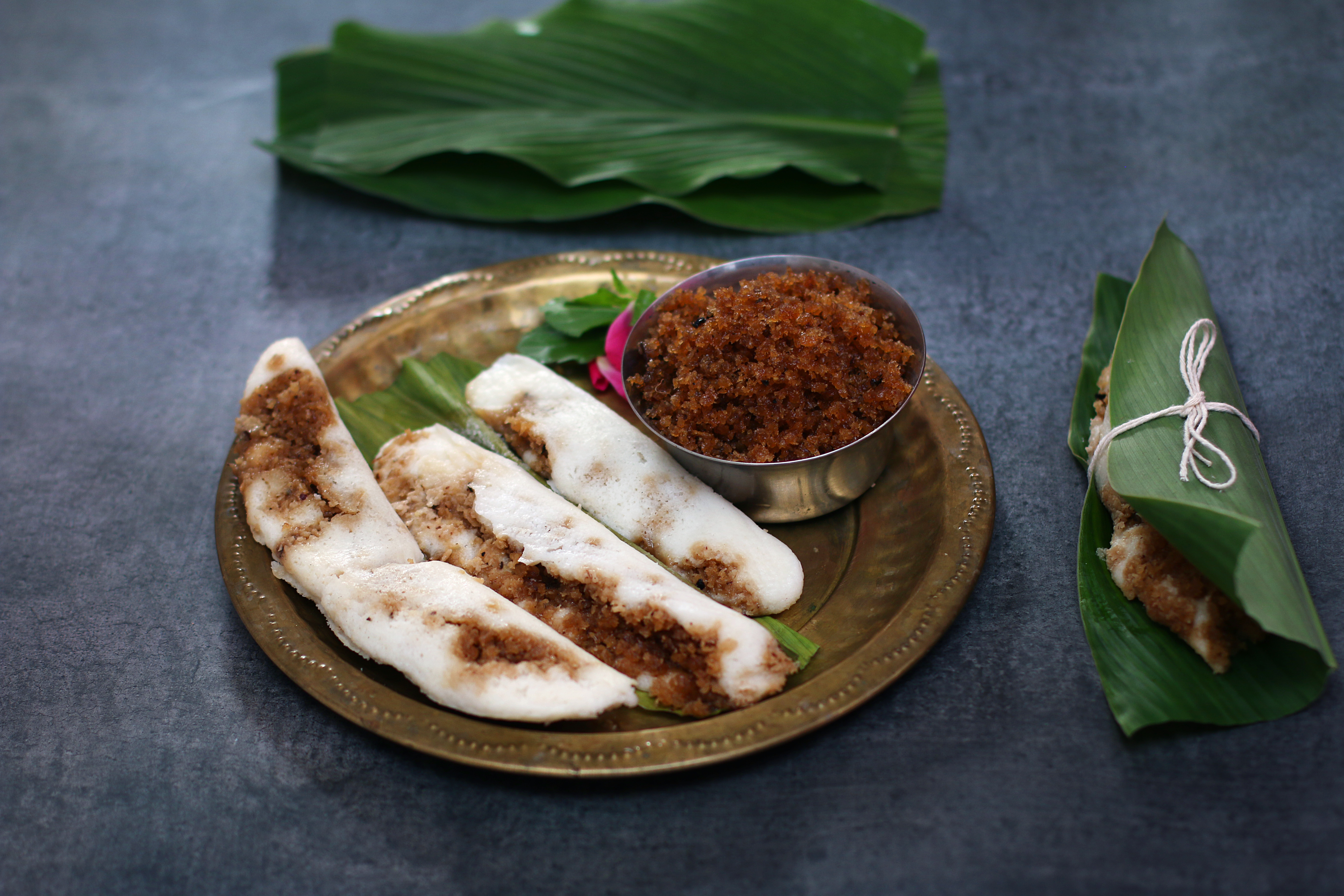
Enduri pitha, made on Prathamastami.

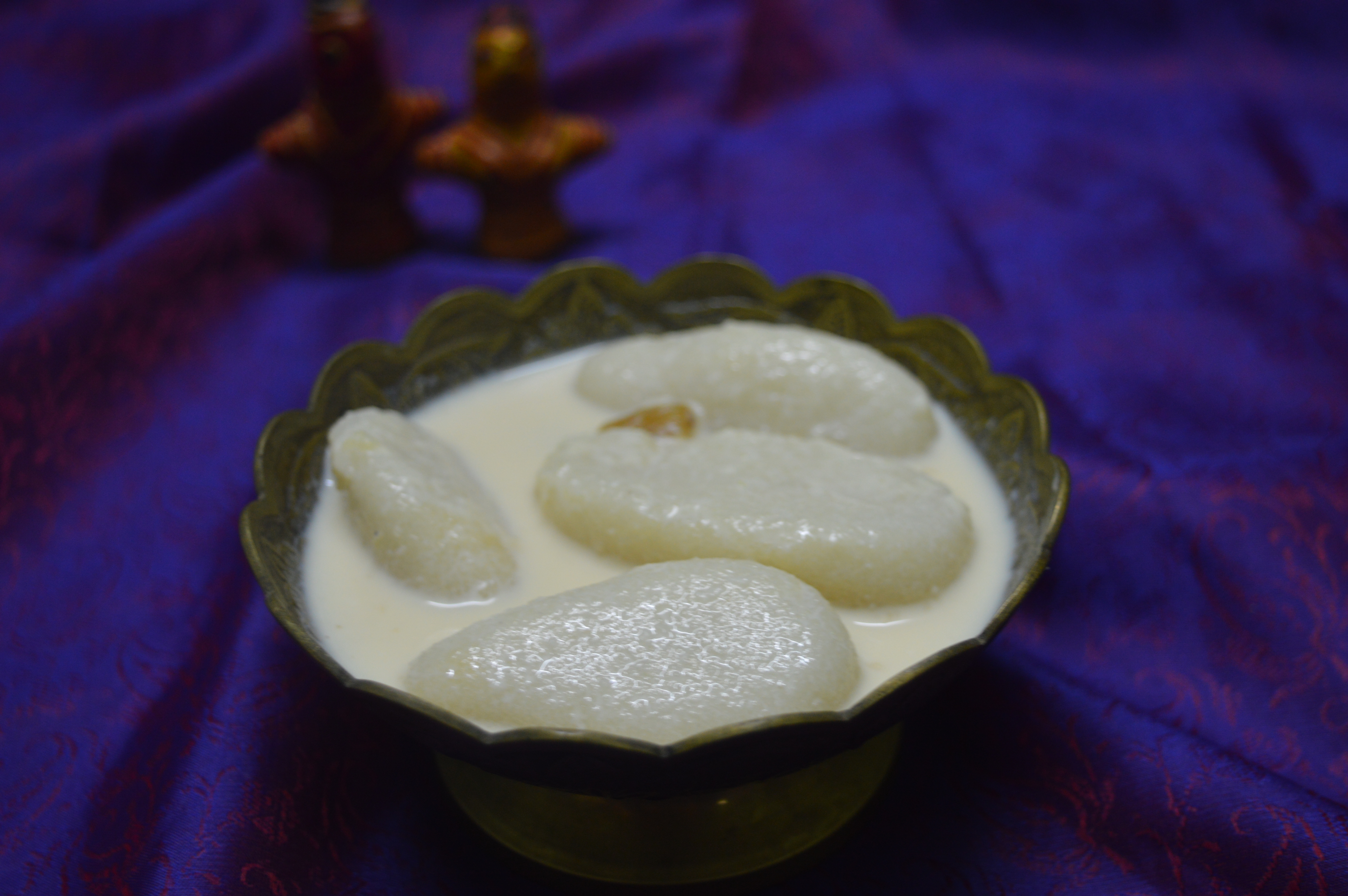
Gaintha pitha, made on Bakula Amabasya.

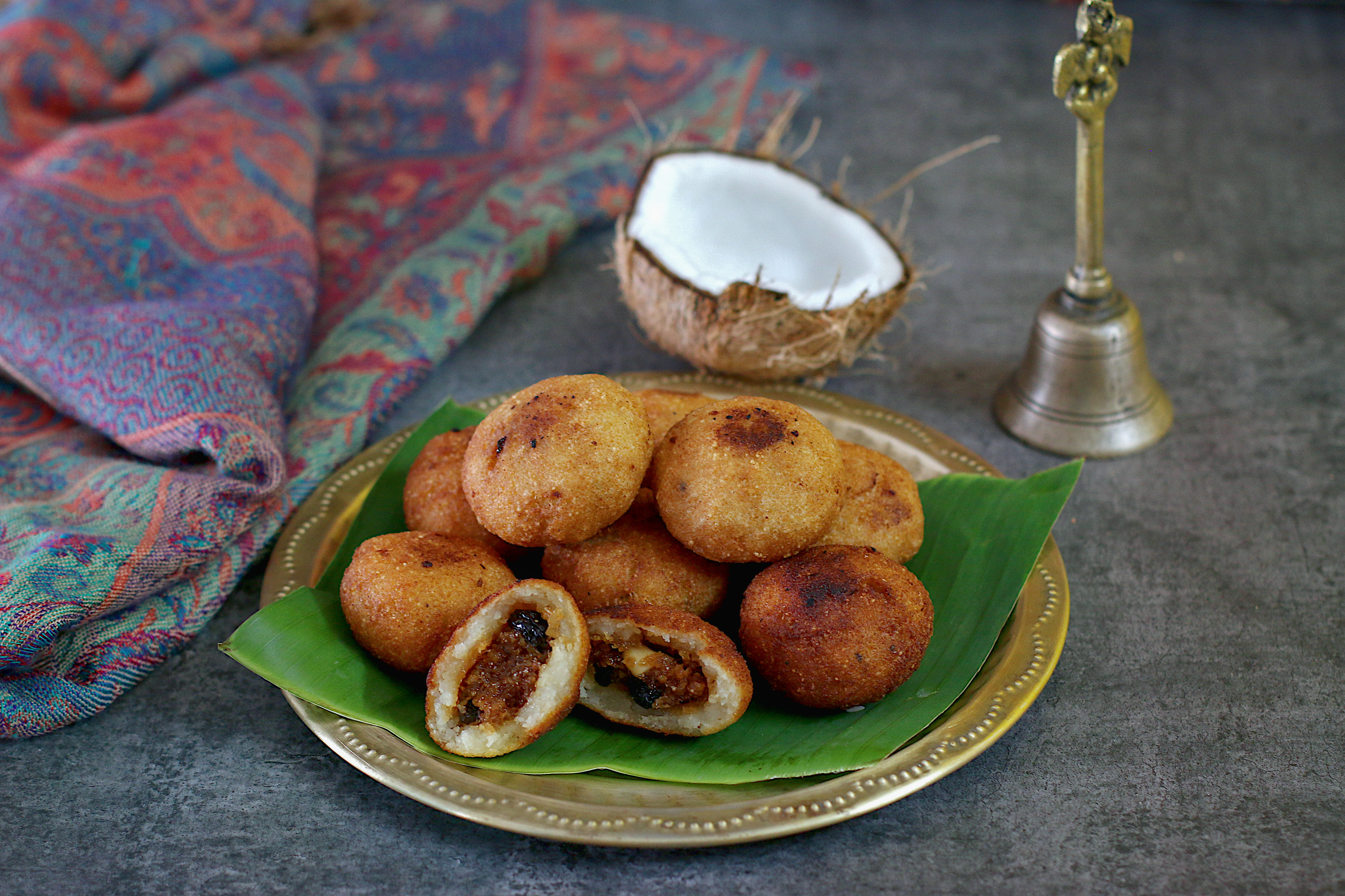
Kakara pitha

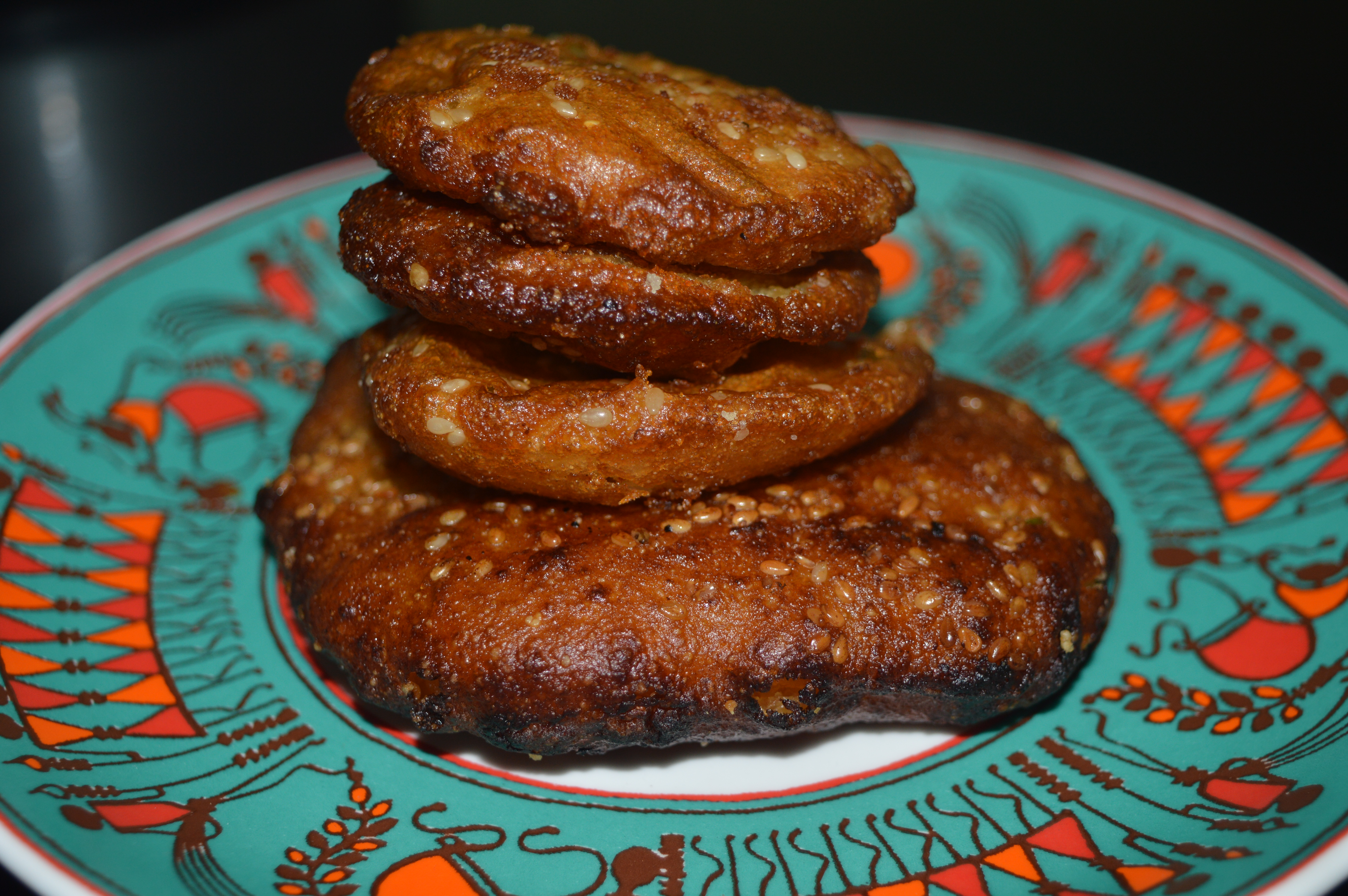
Arisa pitha

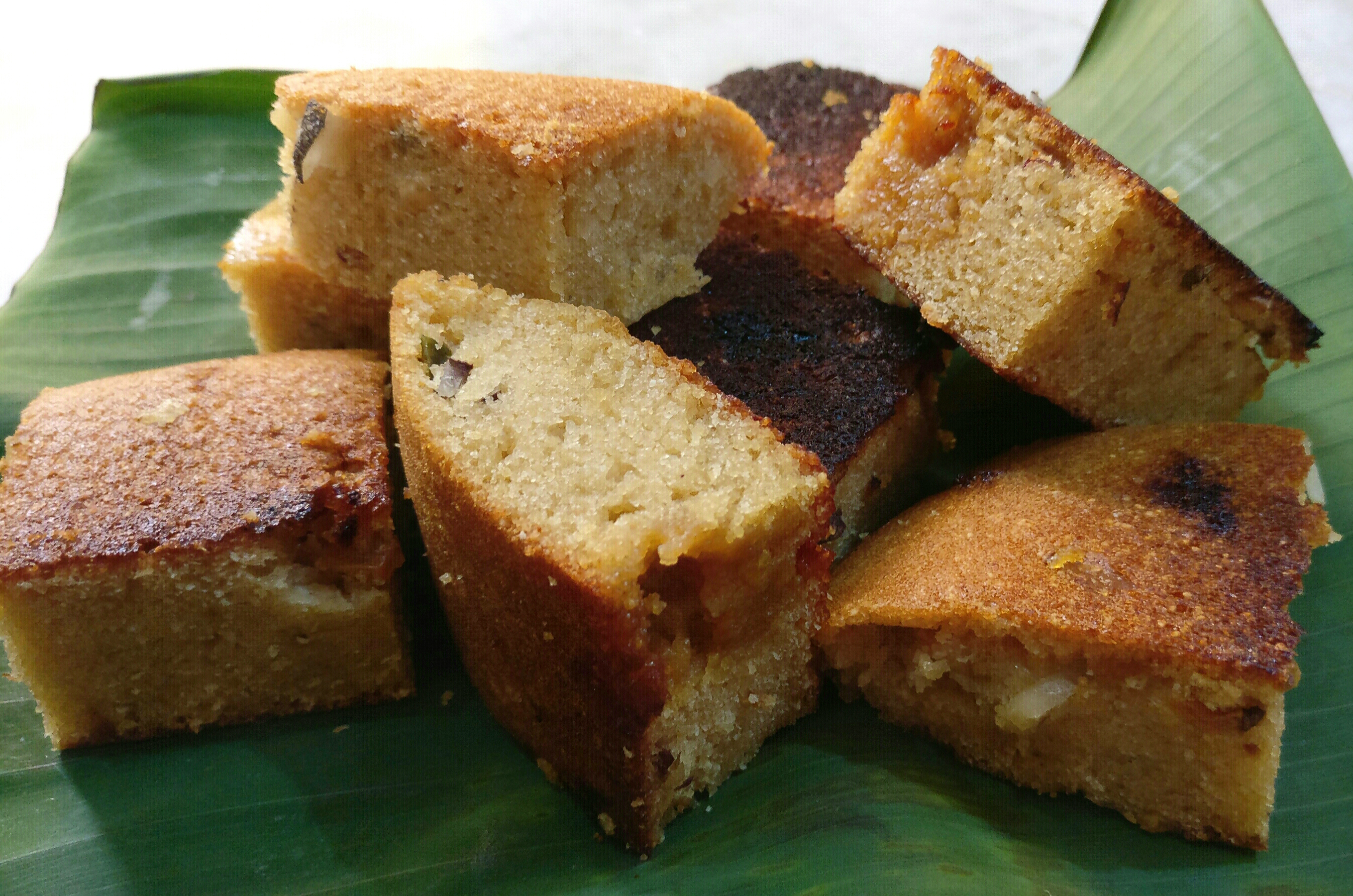
Poda pitha, offered to Lord Jagannatha during Ratha Jatra.

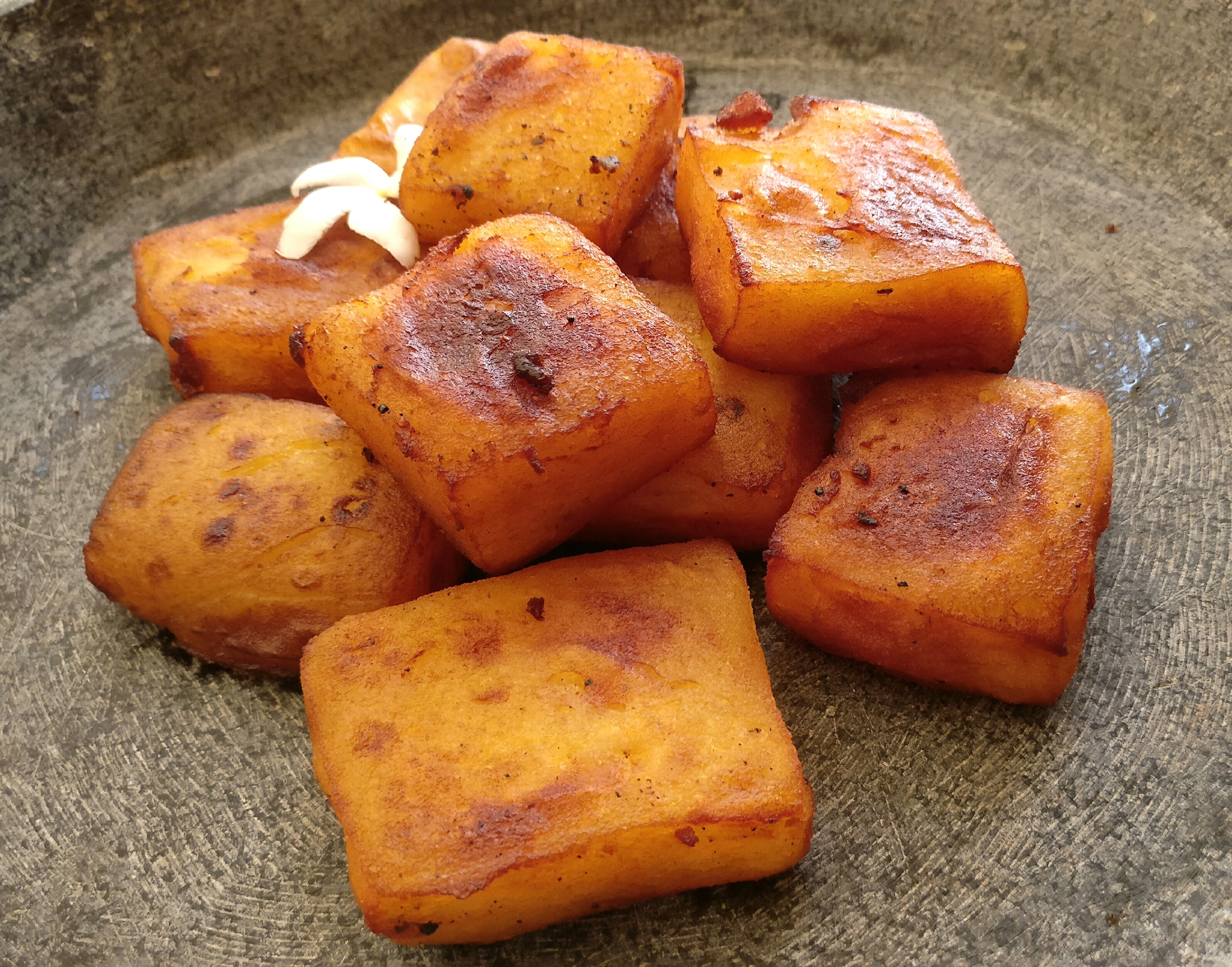
Chandrakanti or Mugakanti pitha

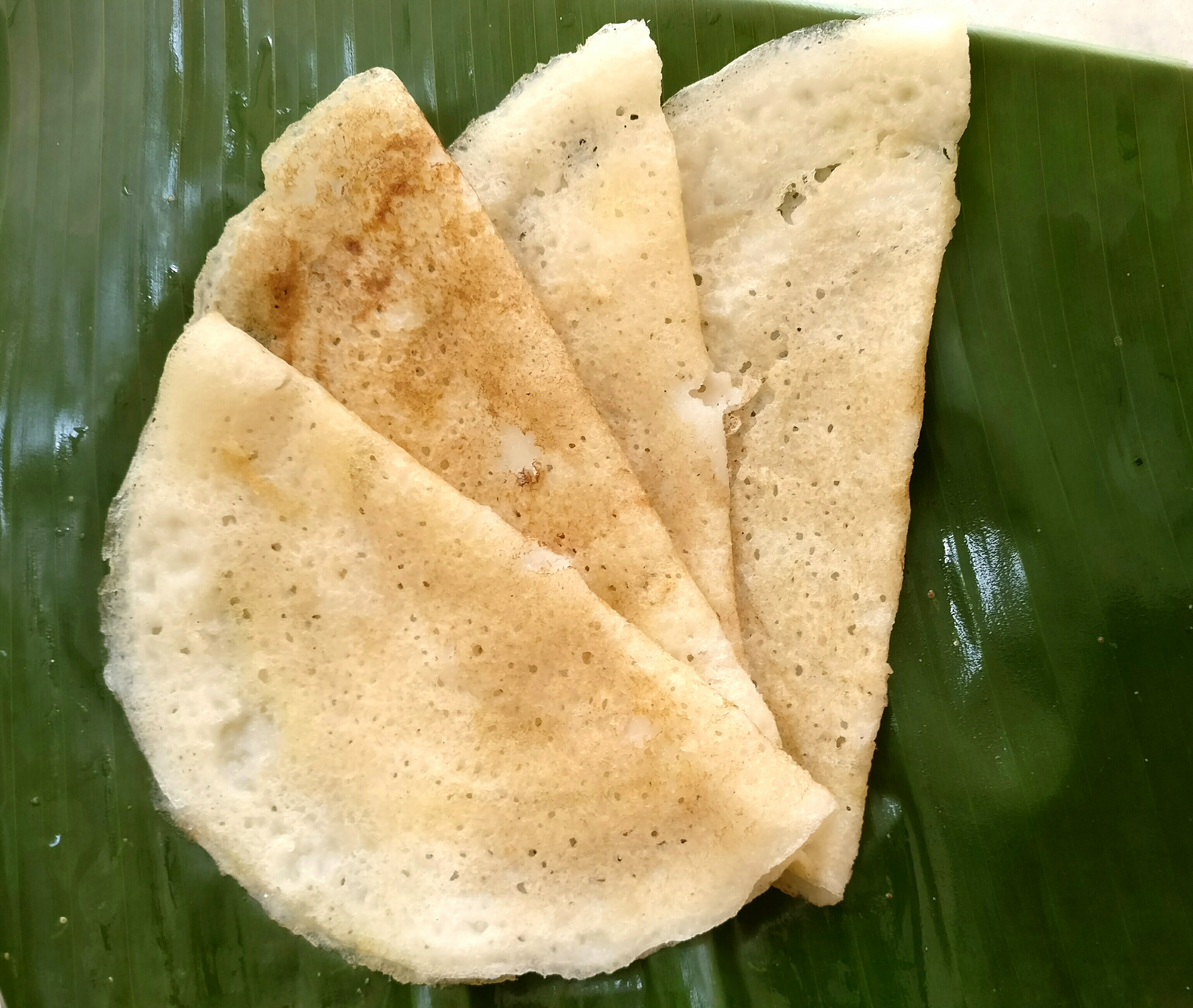
Chakuli pitha

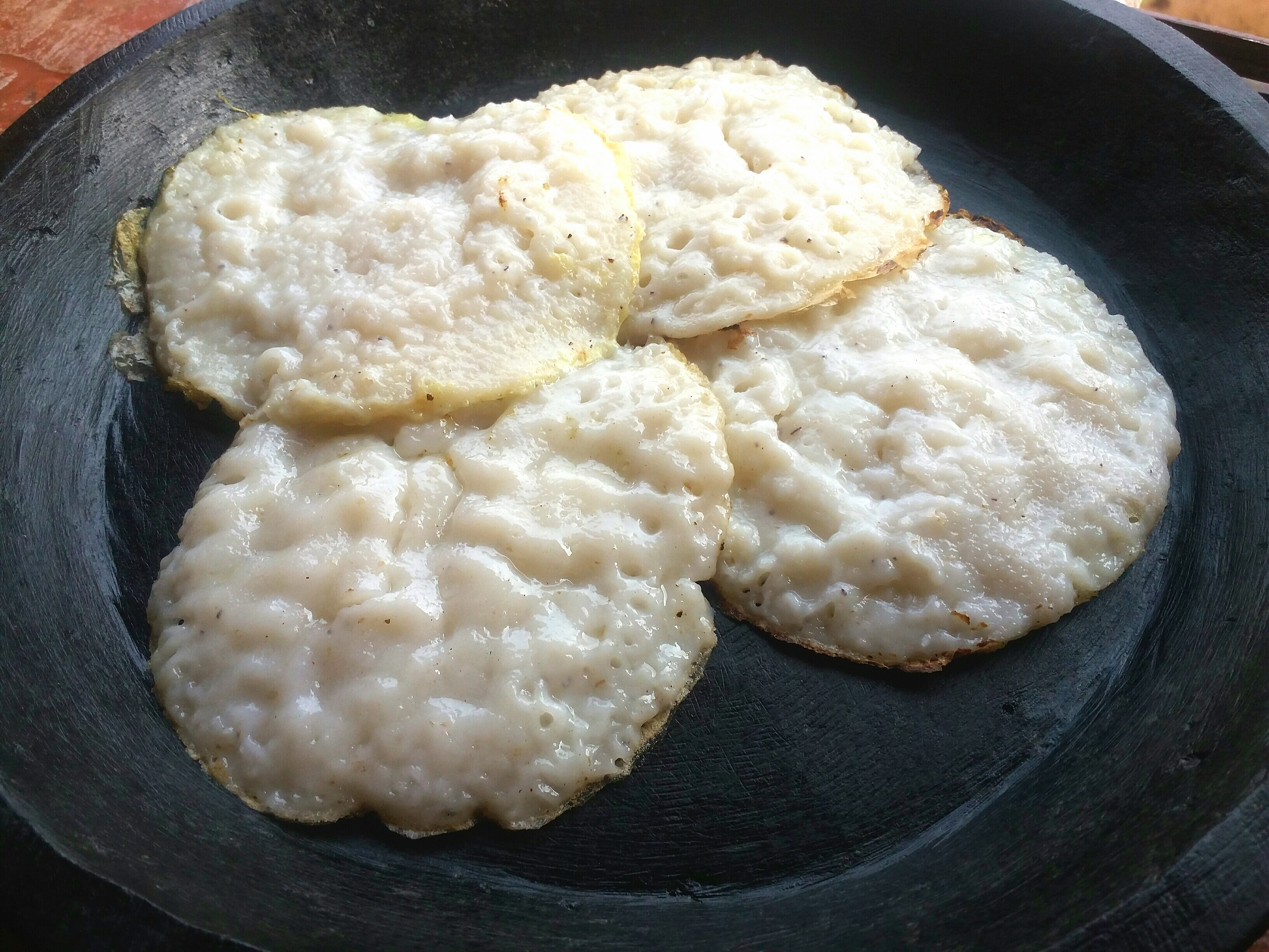
Chitau pitha, made on Chitalagi Amabasya

=== In Assam ===
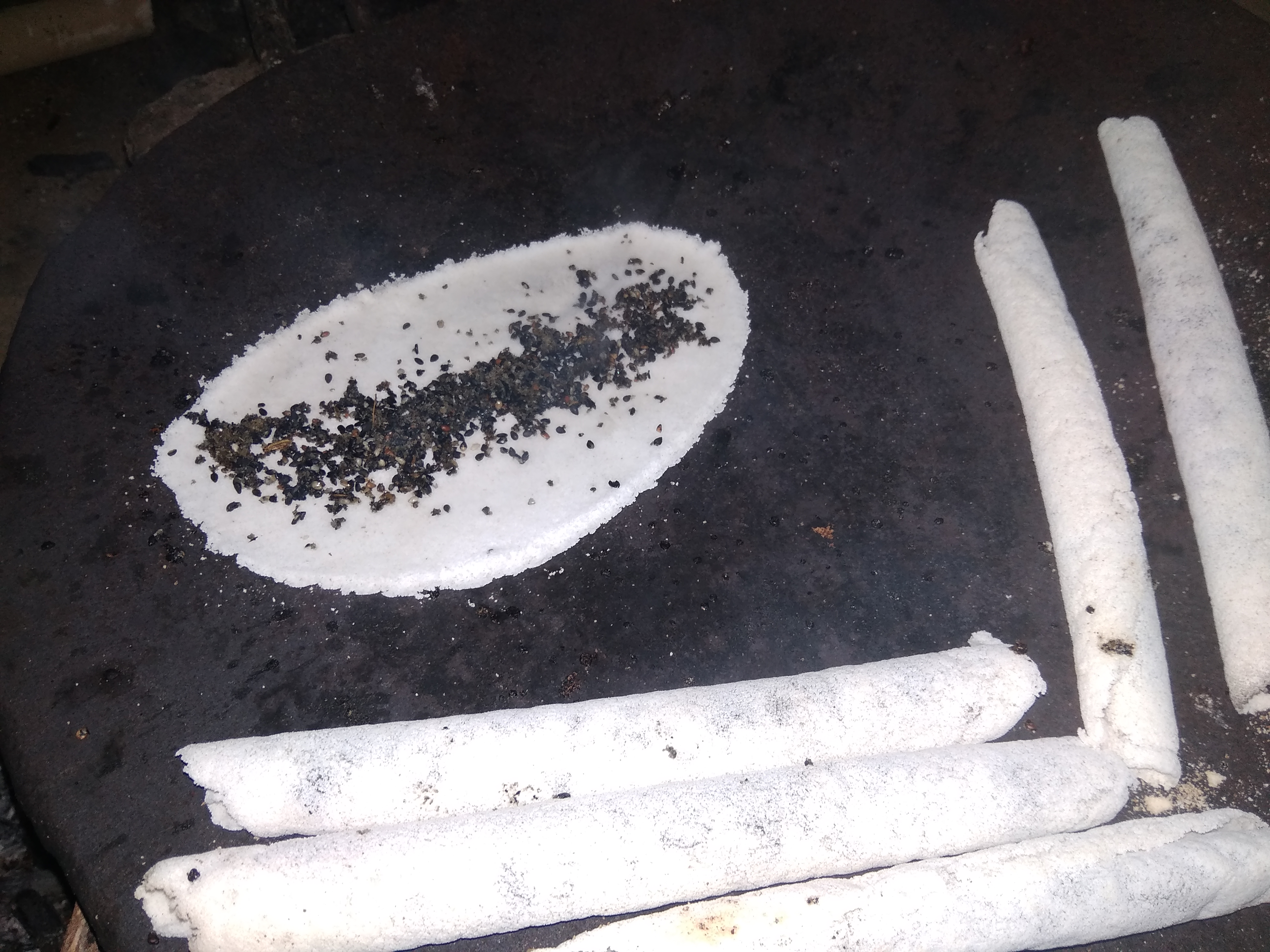
Til pitha

In Assam, pitha is a special class of rice preparation generally made only on special occasions like Bihu. Assamese pithas are often made from bora saul, a special kind of glutinous rice, or xaali saul, sun-dried rice. Some pithas commonly found in Assam include the following:

- Kachi pitha (কাঁচি পিঠা, lit. 'sickle pitha': a pan-baked pancake made from bora saul and filled with sesame seeds, ground coconut, dried orange rind, and jaggery. The sickle is known as "Kachi" in Assamese, hence the name.
- Ghila pitha (ঘিলা পিঠা, lit. 'knee pitha'): a fried pitha made from bora saul and jaggery. Salt can also be used instead of jaggery for a savory variant.
- Sunga pitha (চুঙা পিঠা): a special pitha made with both xaali saul and bora saul, which are mixed with water and jaggery and churned thoroughly before being placed in a young bamboo tube corked with banana leaf and fire-roasted. The resulting tube-shaped cake is then cut into pieces and served with hot milk.
- Tekeli pitha (টেকেলি পিঠা, lit. 'earthenware pitha'): a special pitha made with both xaali saul and bora saul, mixed with coconut, sugar, and powdered milk. Ground cardamom and dried orange rind can also be added. The pitha is steamed in an earthenware pot or a kettle set on a hearth.
- Uhuwa pitha (উহোৱা পিঠা): rice flour of xaali saul and bora saul is mixed with jaggery or salt and water and churned thoroughly. The paste is rolled into small balls and flattened and then boiled in water. It is served with tea and also can be eaten with milk.
- Ketli pitha (কেটলি পিঠা): a pitha with a similar method of preparation and substance to the tekeli pitha, but a kettle is used to make it instead of earthenware, hence the name (ketli means 'kettle' in Assamese). It usually takes less time bake than tekeli pitha.
- Til pitha (তিল পিঠা): a cylindrical cigar-like pitha made with sesame and rice. Rice flour is spread in a circle on a cast-iron pan and heated, and roasted sesame seeds are placed in the circle along with sugar or jaggery and rolled.
- Tel pitha (তেল পিঠা): a pitha fried in oil
- Narikol diya pitha (নাৰিকল দিয়া পিঠা বা নাৰিকলৰ পিঠা)
- Xutuli pitha (সুতুলি পিঠা)
- Dhup pitha (ধূপ পিঠা), also known as bhapa pitha
- Bhapotdiya pitha (ভাপতদিয়া পিঠা)
- Lakhimi pitha (লখিমী পিঠা)
- Tora pitha (তৰা পিঠা)
- Muthiya pitha (মুঠিয়া পিঠা)
- Kholasapori pitha (খোলাচাপৰি পিঠা)
- Laskara (লস্কৰা)
- Anguli pitha (আঙুলি পিঠা): a finger-shaped pitha; in Assamese, anguli means 'finger'.

=== In Bangladesh, West Bengal, Tripura ===
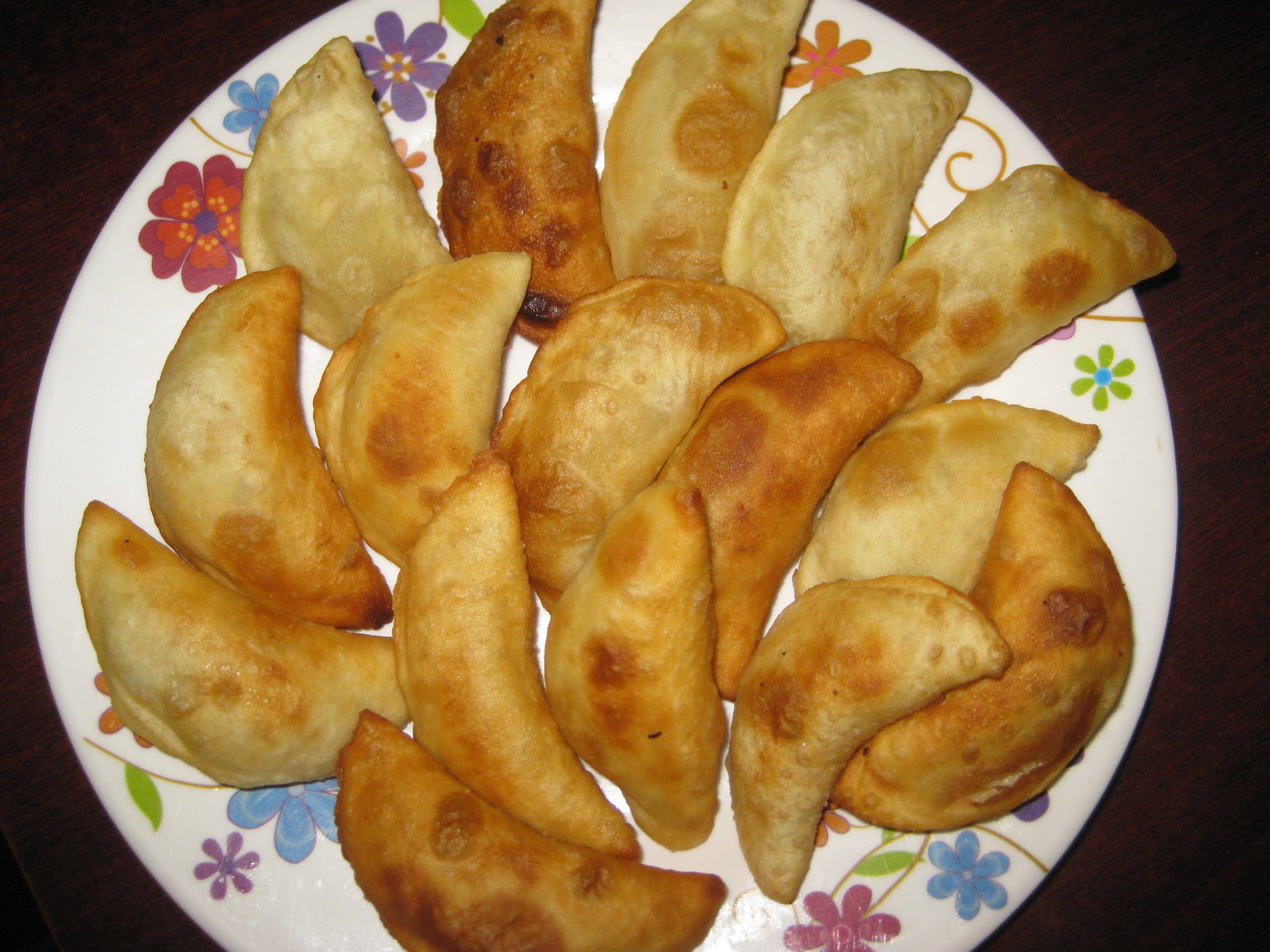
Puli Pitha

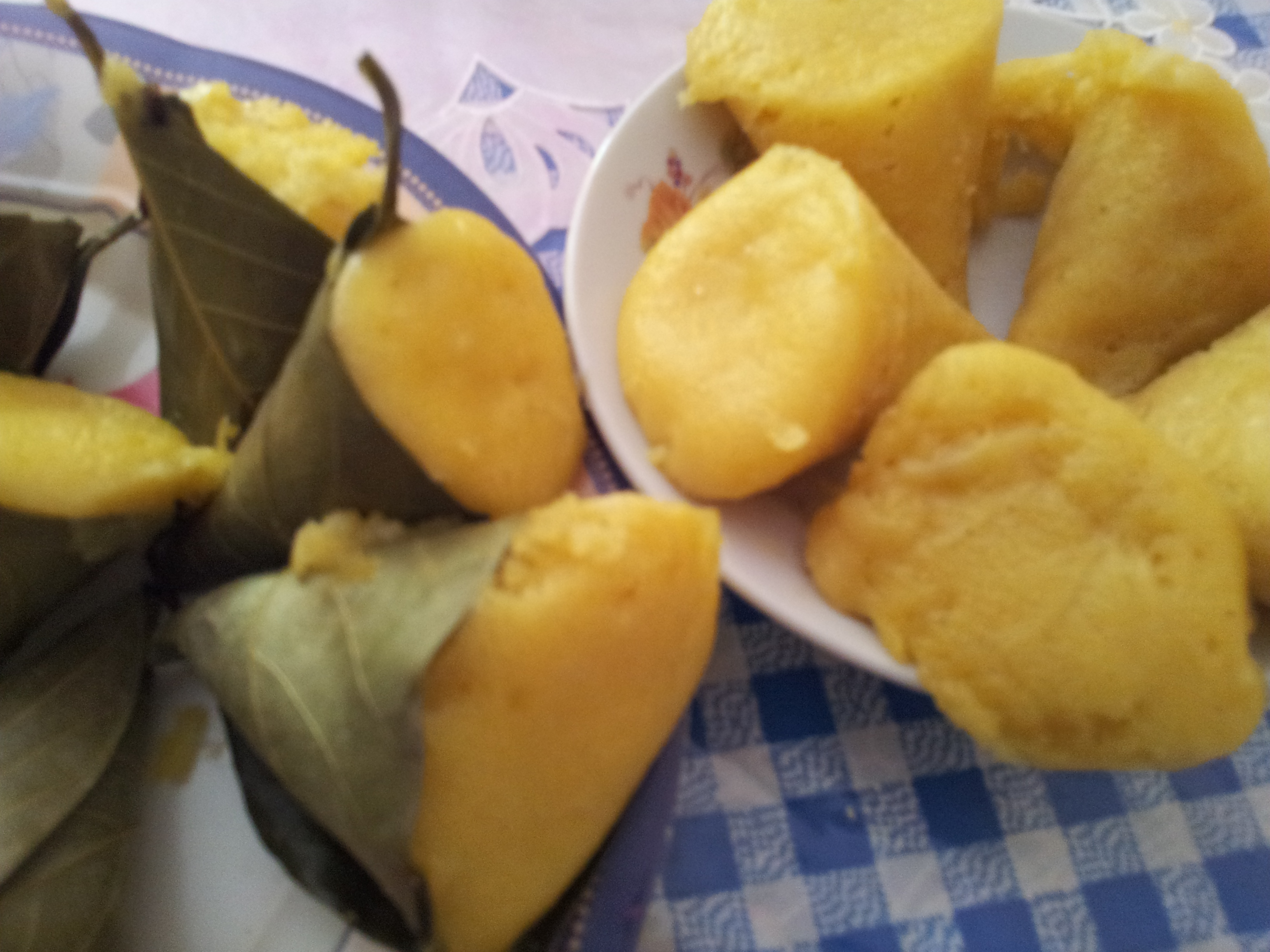
Taal Pitha

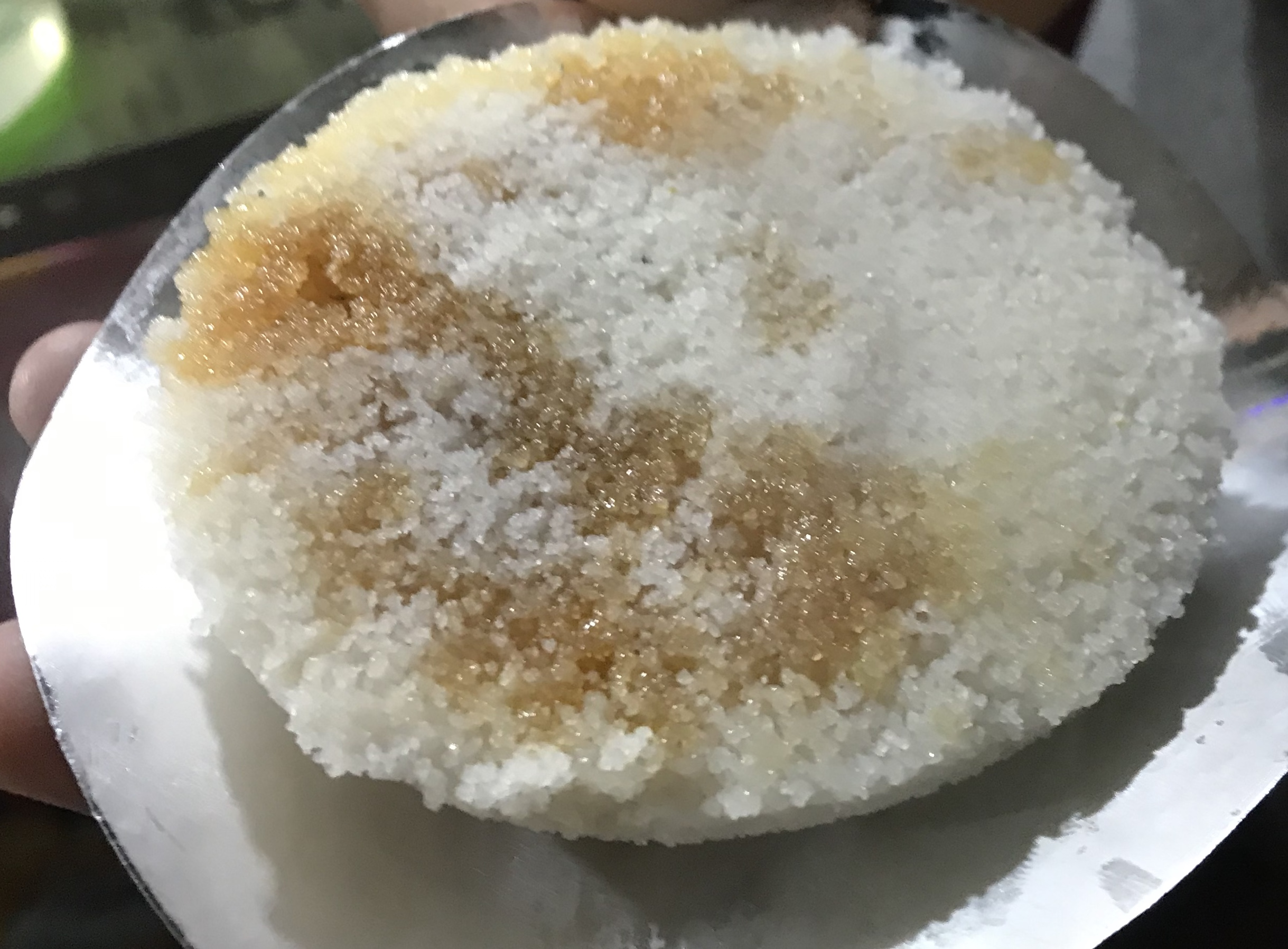
Bhapa pitha

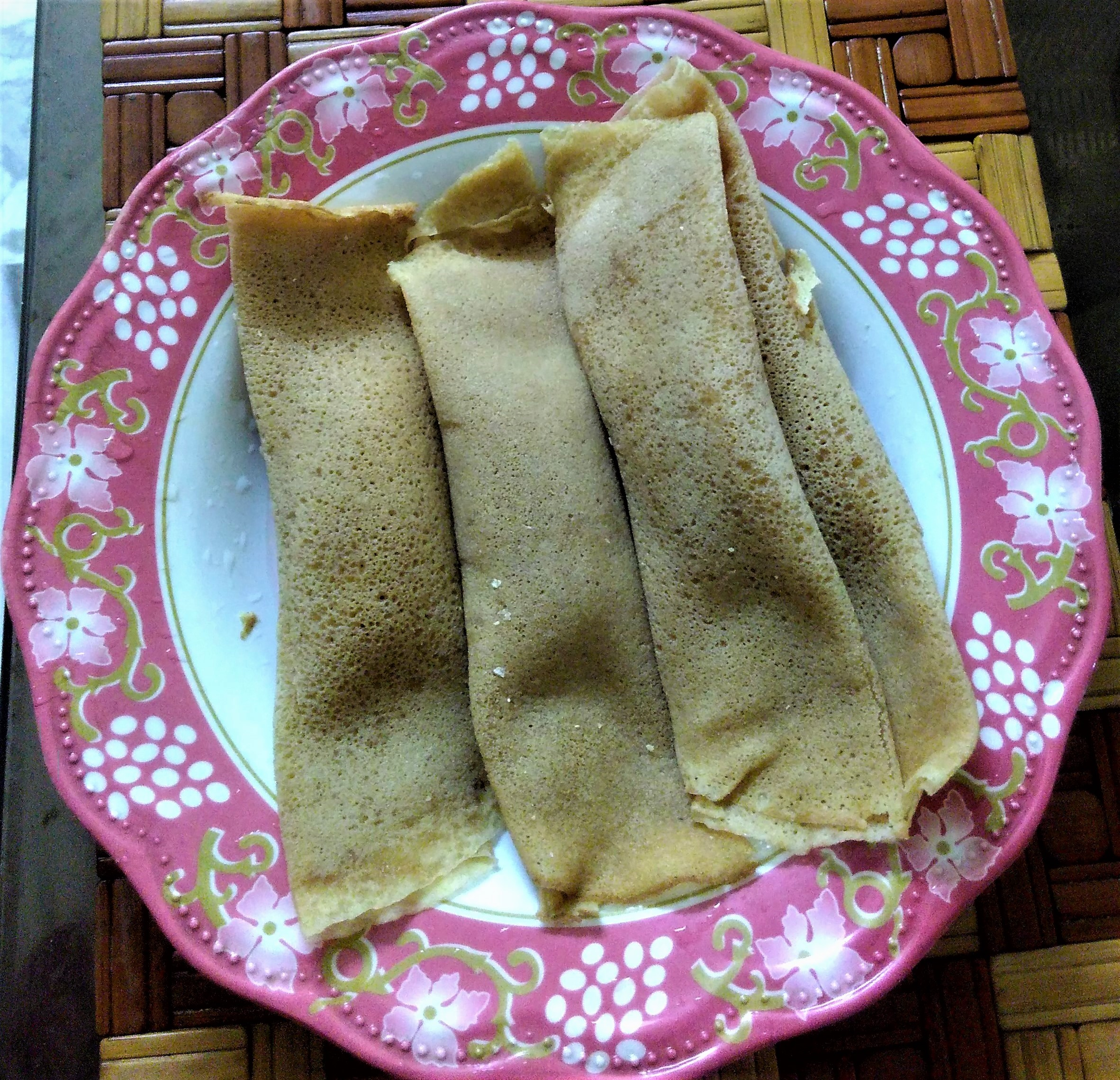
Patisapta pitha, Kolkata, West Bengal

It is also called pitha (Bengali: পিঠা; piṭha). While some pitha can be made at any time of the year in Bengal (Bangladesh and the Indian state of West Bengal), there are special pitha strongly associated with harvest festivals such as Nabanna (Bengali: নবান্ন nôbanno, literally "new rice" or "new food") and the Poush parbon or Makar Sankranti, celebrated on 14 January every year. During the autumn and winter seasons, festivals dedicated to pitha called pitha mela or pitha utshob are held locally all over Bangladesh.

Some common ingredients in pitha are rice flour, milk, coconut and jaggery. It is often served with sweet syrups such as date tree molasses (Bengali: খেজুরের গুড় khejurer guṛ). A few of the most common pitha found in Bengal include the following:

- Teler piṭha (তেলের পিঠা, lit. 'oil pitha'), also known as Guror Handesh or simply Handesh: a Pitha that originates in Sylhet, Bangladesh.
- Khola chitoi (খোলা চিতই): a crêpe made with rice flour and eggs that originates from Noakhali.
- Nuner pitha (নুনের পিঠা, lit. 'The pitha of salt'): generally a mixture of water, onions, gingers, turmeric powder, salt, coriander leaves, chili pepper and rice flour; after adding the rice flour the mixture will turn into dough after which it is smashed down and cut into circles. Nuner pitha originates from Sylhet.
- Dudh Chitoi (দুধ চিতই)
- Shingara (সিঙ্গারা): a Bangladeshi version of a samosa. Some consider this as pitha.
- Mohon bashi (মোহনবাঁশি)
- Pakan piṭha (পাকন পিঠা): a small piece of special dough with the artistic symbols of generally a leaf or a flour fried and soaked with shira (sauger water with cardamom).
- Puli piṭha (পুলি পিঠা): a dumpling like dish with brads in the end and stuffed with a coconut mixture or kheer. Fried or steamed.
- Beni piṭha (বেনি পিঠা, lit. 'braid pitha')
- Dudher piṭha (দুধের পিঠা, lit. 'milk pitha') or bhija piṭha (ভিজা পিঠা, lit. 'wet pitha')
- Chôndropuli (চন্দ্র পুলি)
- Chondonpata (চন্দনপাতা)
- Mach Pitha (মাছ পিঠা): a fish-shaped samosa stuffed with fish mince.
- Muger puli (মুগের পুলি)
- Biscuit pitha (বিস্কুট পিঠা): deep fried cookies. Generally come in different shapes and colors.
- Dudh puli (দুধ পুলি)
- Nakshi Pitha (lit. 'The Pitha of artistic patterns'): a piece of special dough sculpted into art via a bamboo stick or a small metal plate moulded into a v shape. This Pitha is a beautiful piece of art originating from the rural part of Bangladesh.
- Paṭi shapta (পাটিসাপটা পিঠা) or Patibola (পাটিবলা): a thin crepe stuffed with jaggery and coconut or kheer.
- Bhapa pitha (ভাপা পিঠা) or Dhupi pitha (ধুপি পিঠা): a steamed ricecake.
- Taler pitha (তালের পিঠা, lit. 'palm pitha'): a Pitha that can be made in many ways, it can be fried, steamed, made with batter and more but it always has to be made with Asian palmyra palm fruits. Taler Pitha has many varieties and each originating from a different place in Bengal such as the batter version of Taler Pitha and Taler Bibi khan Pitha which originates from Bangladesh and some other versions which originates from other West Bengal and neighbouring regions such as Tripura, Assam, Mizoram, Nagaland, Meghalaya, Manipur, Orissa, Jharkhand and Bihar.
- Taler Bibi khan Pitha (তালের বিবি খান পিঠা): a type of Bibi khan Pitha and a type of Taler pitha.
- Taler Vapa Pitha (তালের ভাপা পিঠা, lit. 'steamed palm Pitha'): a type of Taler Pitha and Bhapa piṭha.
- Golap Pitha (গোলাপ পিঠা): a rose-shaped deep fried crispy pitha
- Mug pakon (মুগ পাকন): a Pitha that has artistic symbols moulded on top and bottom of it and it is soft since it is soaked with shira (sugar water with cardamom mixed with it).
- Gokul Pitha (গোকুল পিঠা): a special dough fried and then soaked with a special type of shira.
- Chui Pitha or Chutki Pitha: a traditional Old Dhaka Pitha
- Aske Pitha (চিতই পিঠা) or Chitoi Pitha (আস্কে পিঠা): a pancake-like dish made with batter, to make a Chitoi Pitha you need to have a special Chitoi Pitha pan where the batter is generally dropped for he mould to form. Chitoi Pitha. Is generally eaten with kacha morich bhorta and other spicy bhortas.
- Pata pitha (পাতা পিঠা, lit. 'leaf Pitha'): a type of leaf shaped Nokshi pitha.
- Shamuk pitha (শামুক পিঠা): a snail shaped Nokshi Pitha
- Mera pitha (মেরা পিঠা) or doila Pitha (দইল্যা পিঠা): a steamed dumpling made with rice flour, ginger and spices such as turmeric and Jaggery.
- Lonbongo Lotika (লবঙ্গ লতিকা, lit. 'clove lotika')
- Bibi khan Pitha (বিবি খান পিঠা): a steamed Pitha that looks like a cake. Bibi khan Pitha originates in the Bikrampur district, Dhaka, Bangladesh
- Kheer murali (ক্ষীর মুড়ালি)
- Jamai pitha (জামাই পিঠা) or Chips pitha (চিপস পিঠা, lit. 'husband Pitha'): a batter which is moulded into a shape of a flour, sundried and fried. Tastes like papad or chips. Often different in colors. This Pitha originates in Bangladesh.
- Fuljhuri pitha (ফুলঝুড়ি পিঠা) or Fulkuchi pitha (ফুলকুচি পিঠা): a rosette like fried dough. Always made with rice flour.

There are thousands of different pithas in every region of Bengal; these are just a few examples.

=== In Bhojpuri region ===
There is a tradition of preparing Pitha on the occasion of Godhan in Bhojpuri region. It is prepared with soaked and then ground rice and pulses. Pitha is also used as a ritual offering in the region. During Budhwari Puja, observed in the month of Sawan, jayi pitha (barley pitha) is marked with vermilion and offered as part of the ritual. Pitha is also offered with plain tasmai during the Amarpitha puja in the month of Katik. In the Bhojpuri region, Pitha is also offered as part of the worship of the Ganga river.

Some pithas commonly found in Bhojpuri region include:

- Gojha Pitha (also known as Phara)
- Dal Pitha
- Doodh Pitha
- Jayi Pitha
- Saatu Pitha

== Gallery ==
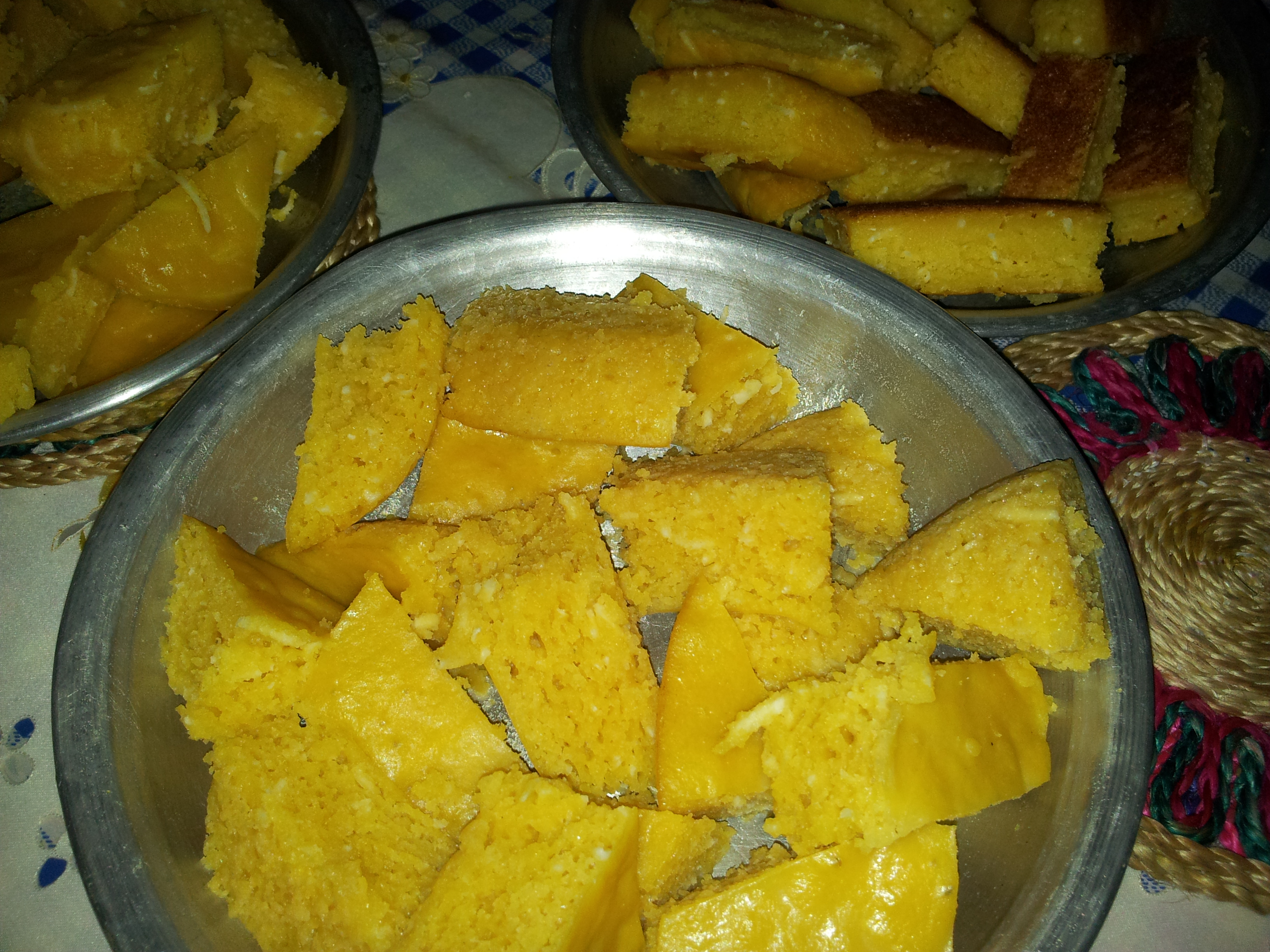

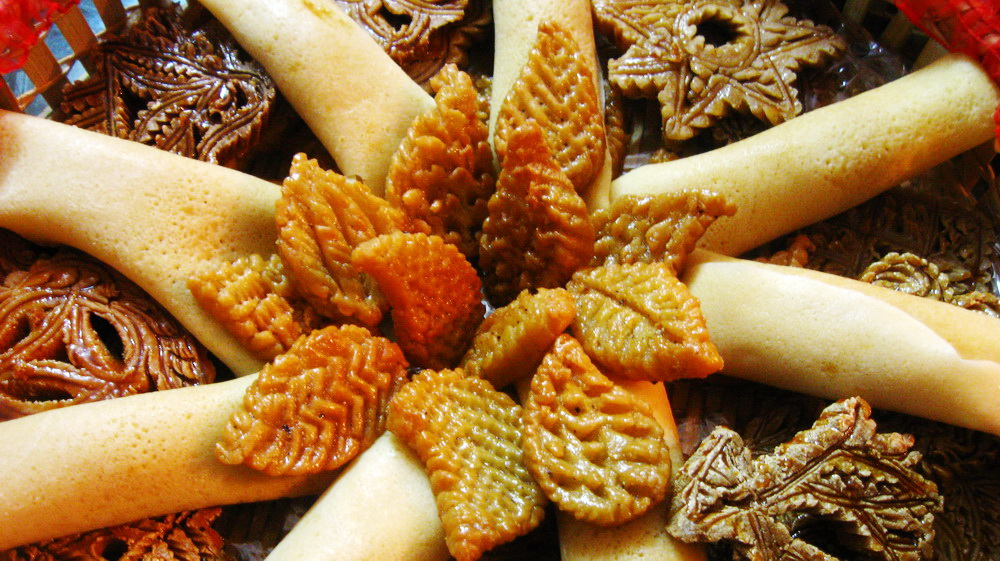

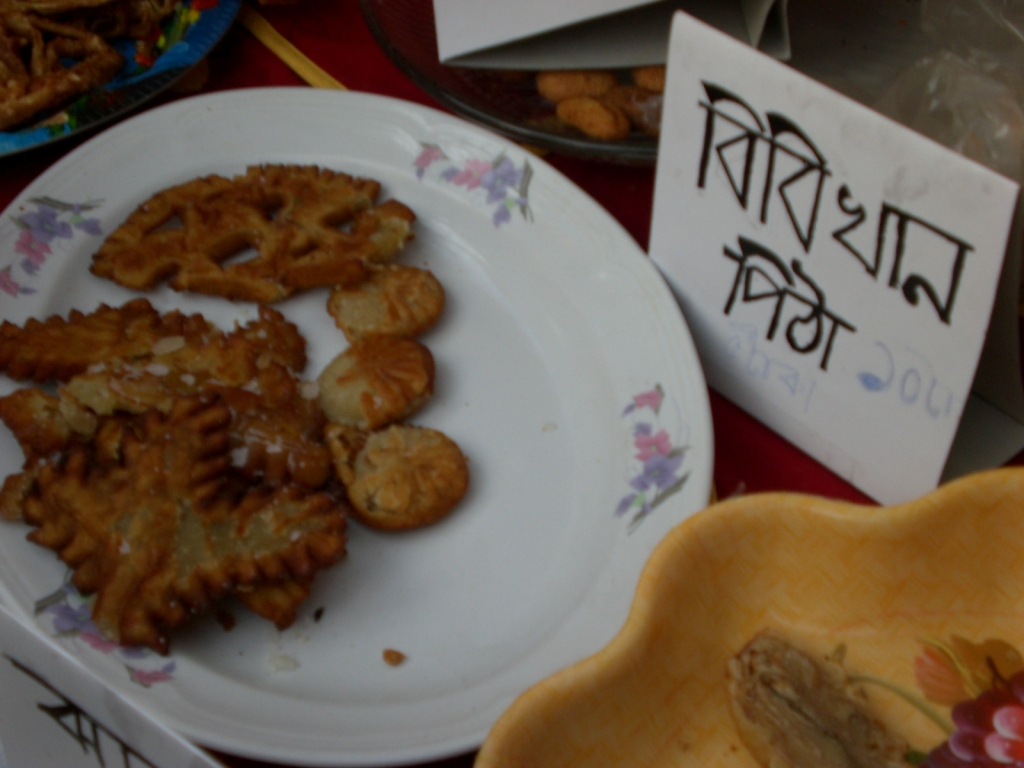

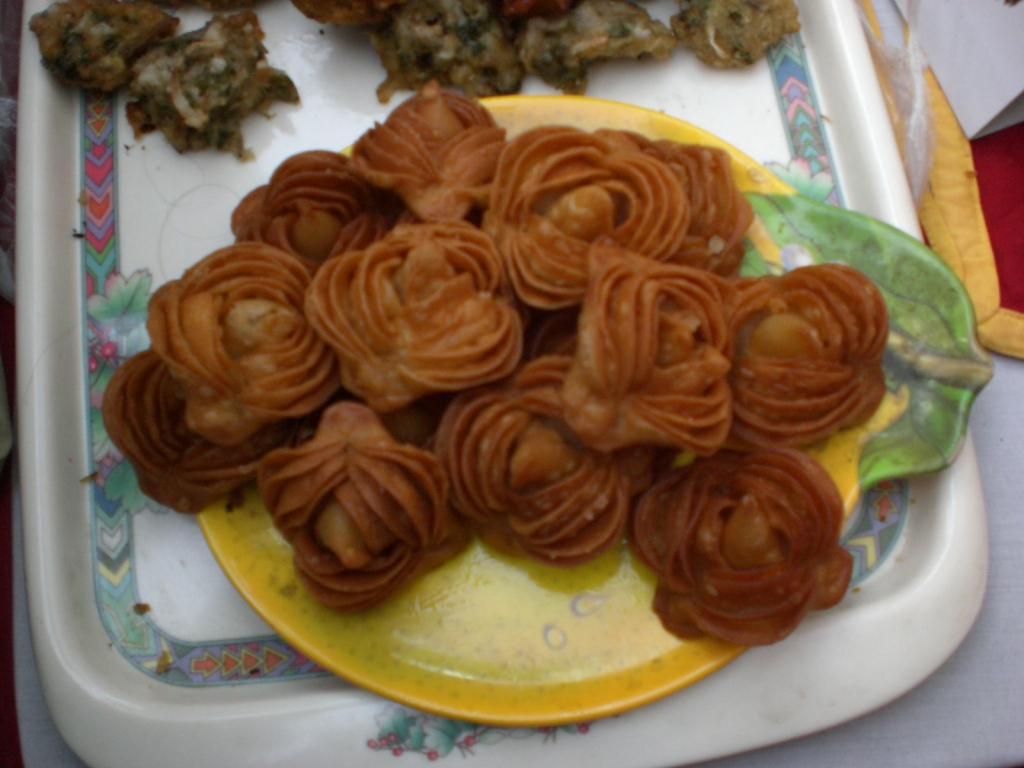

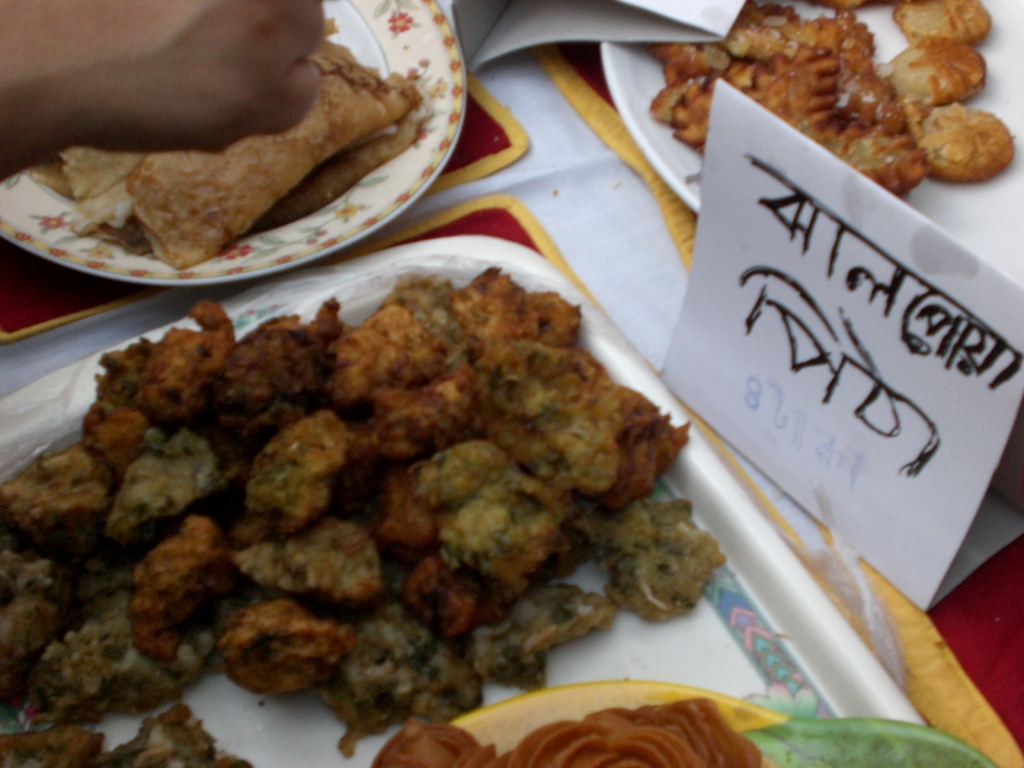

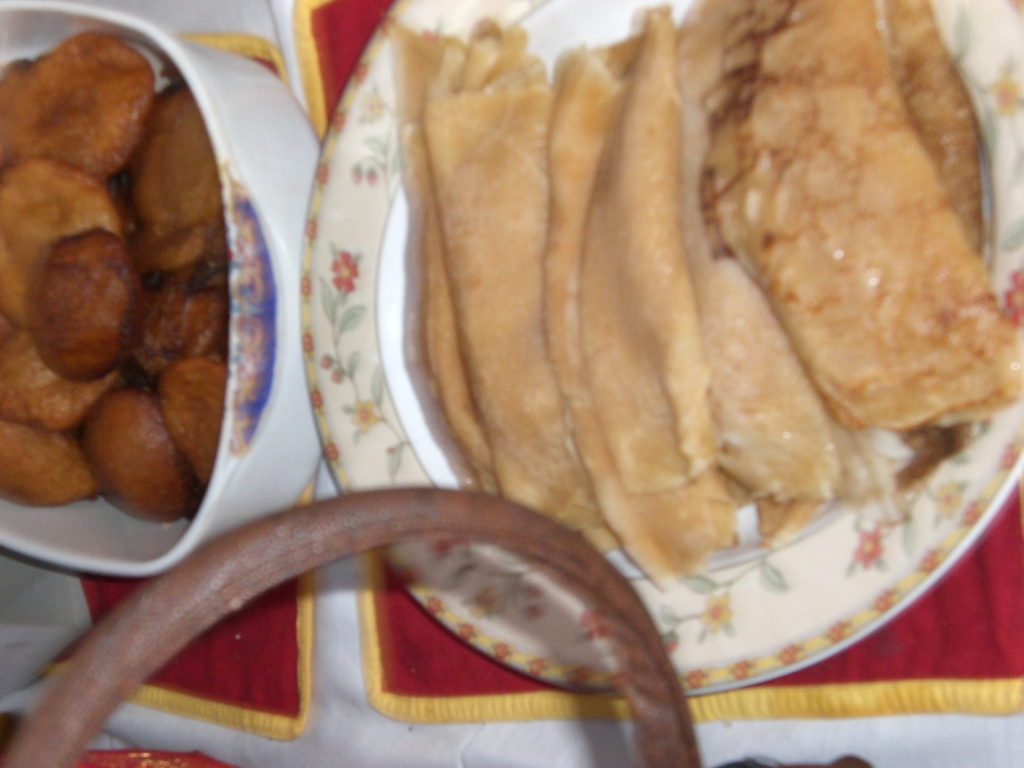

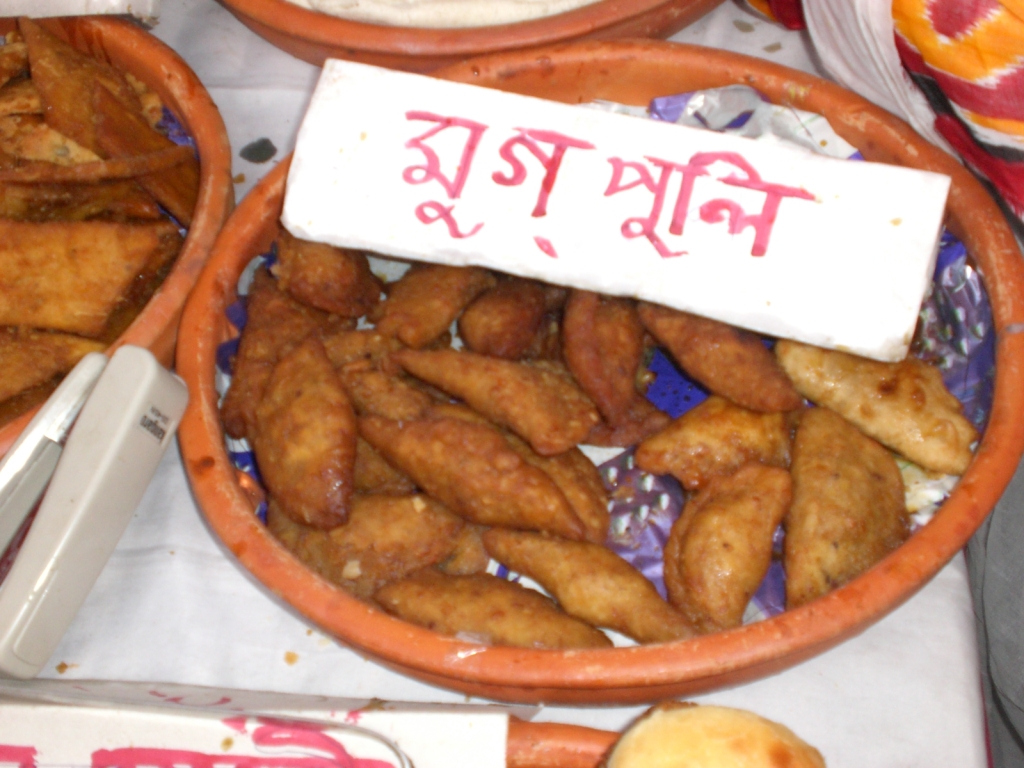

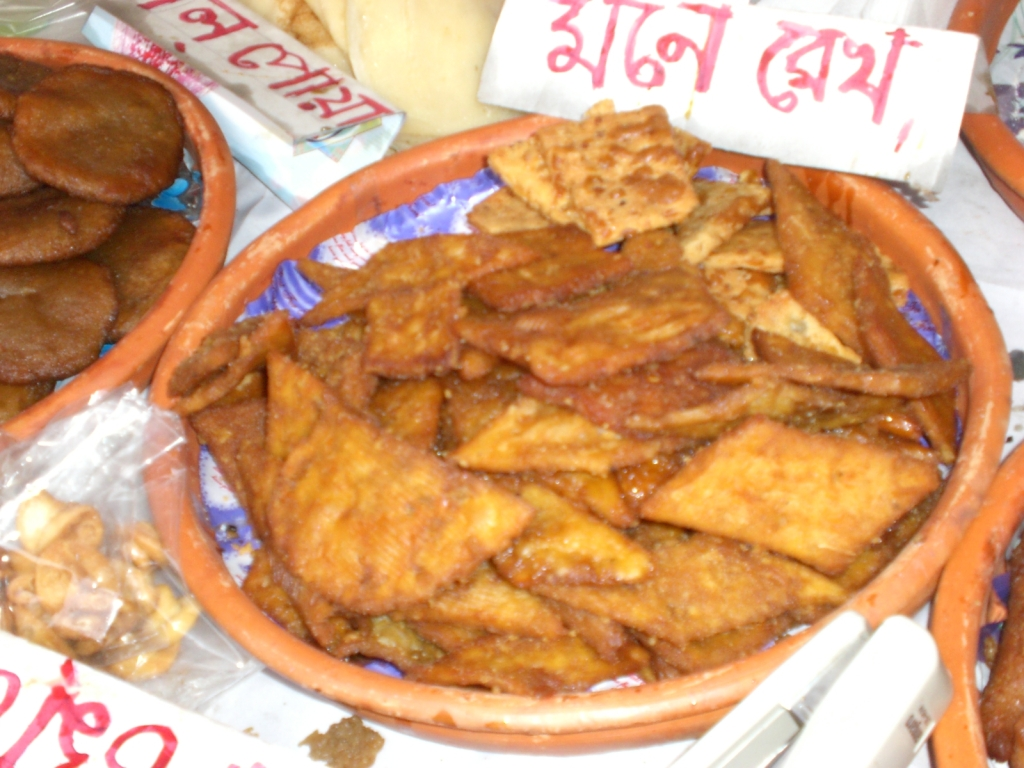

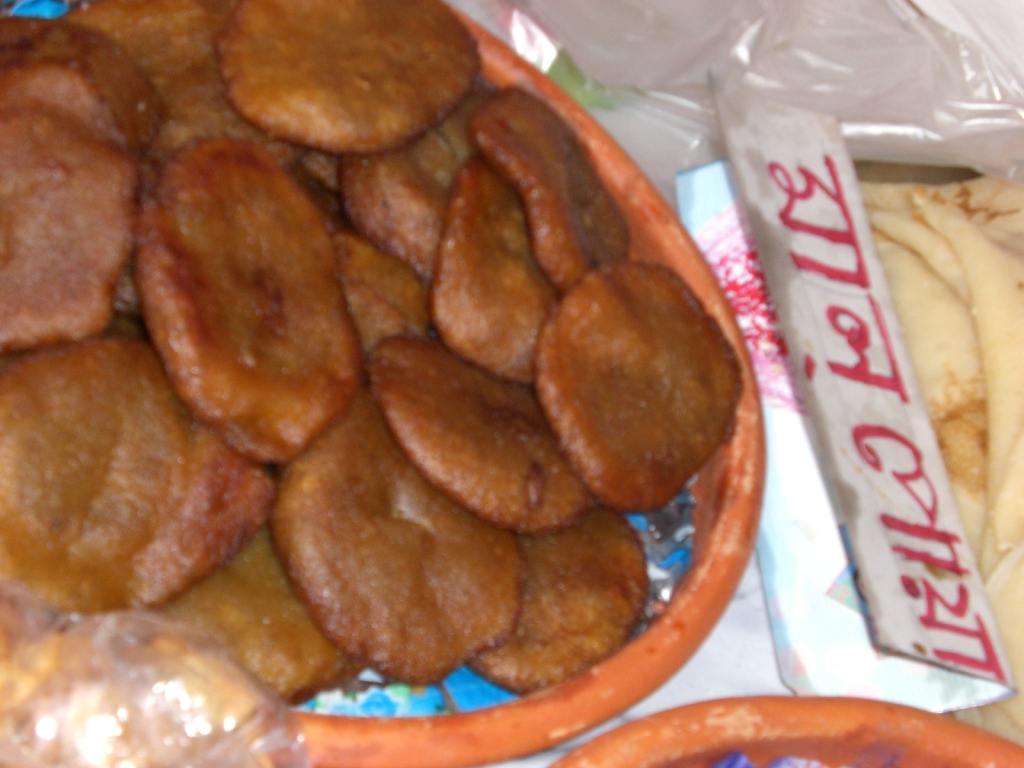

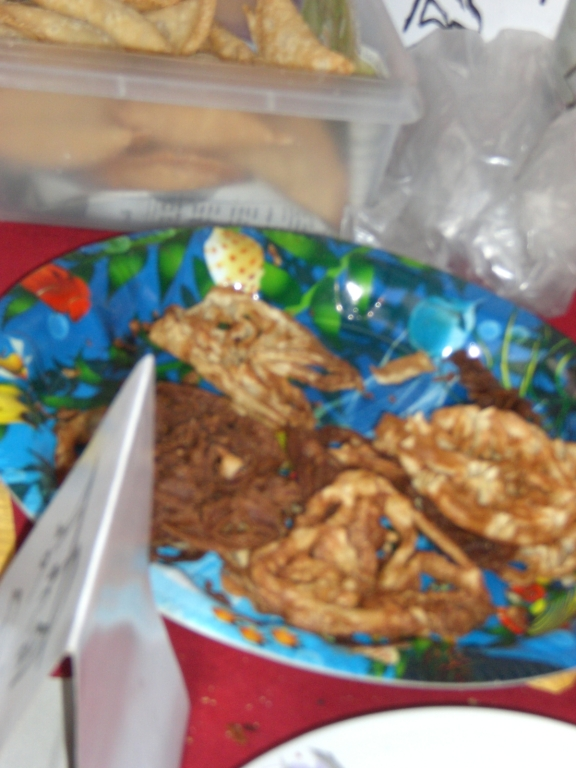

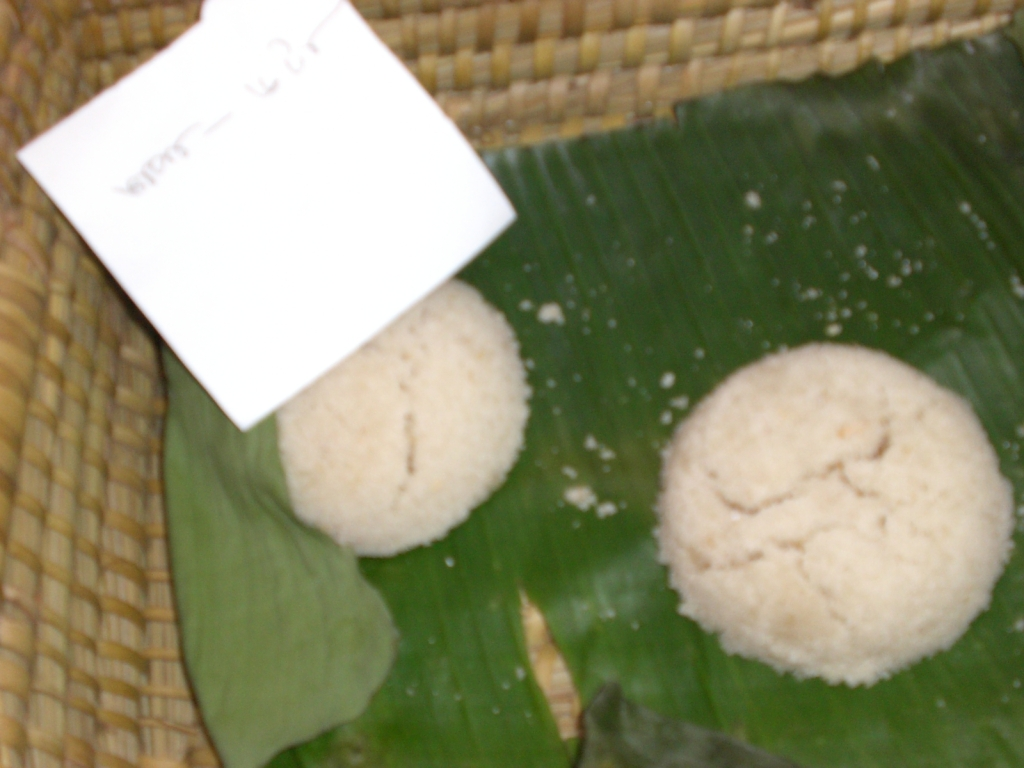

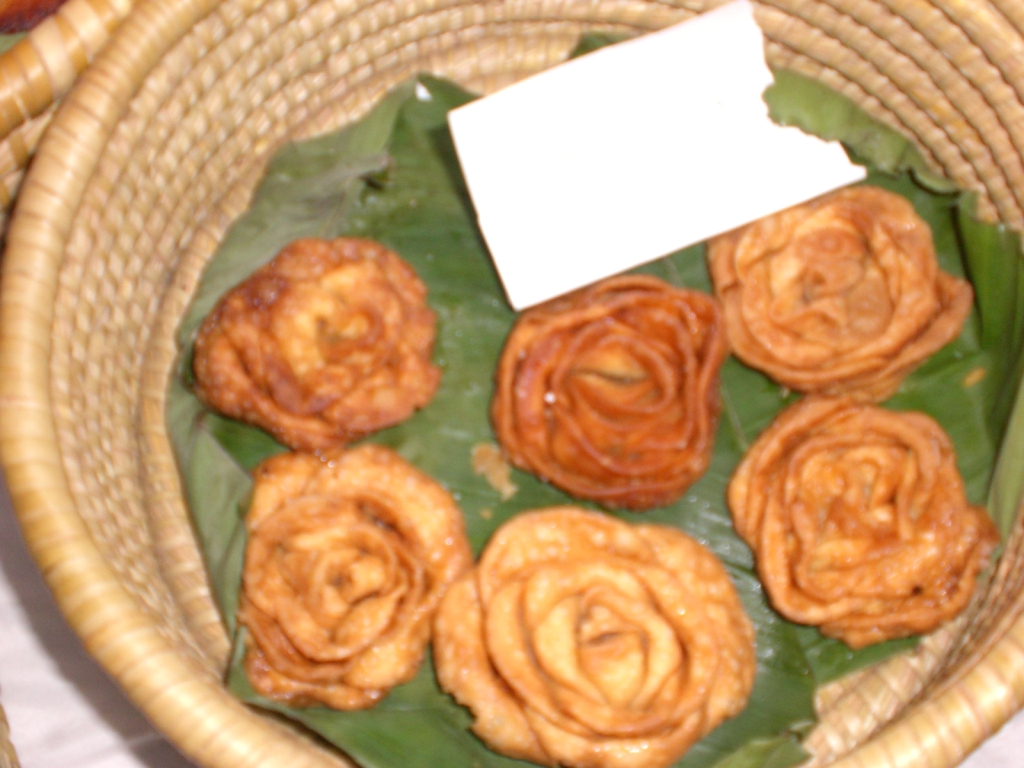

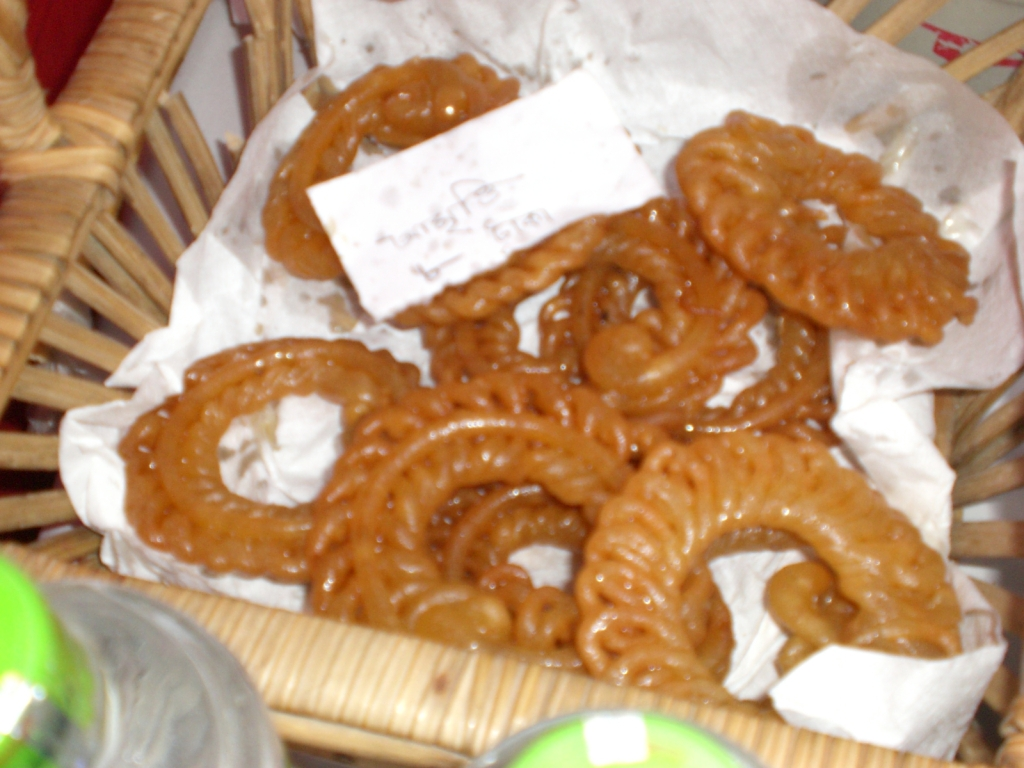

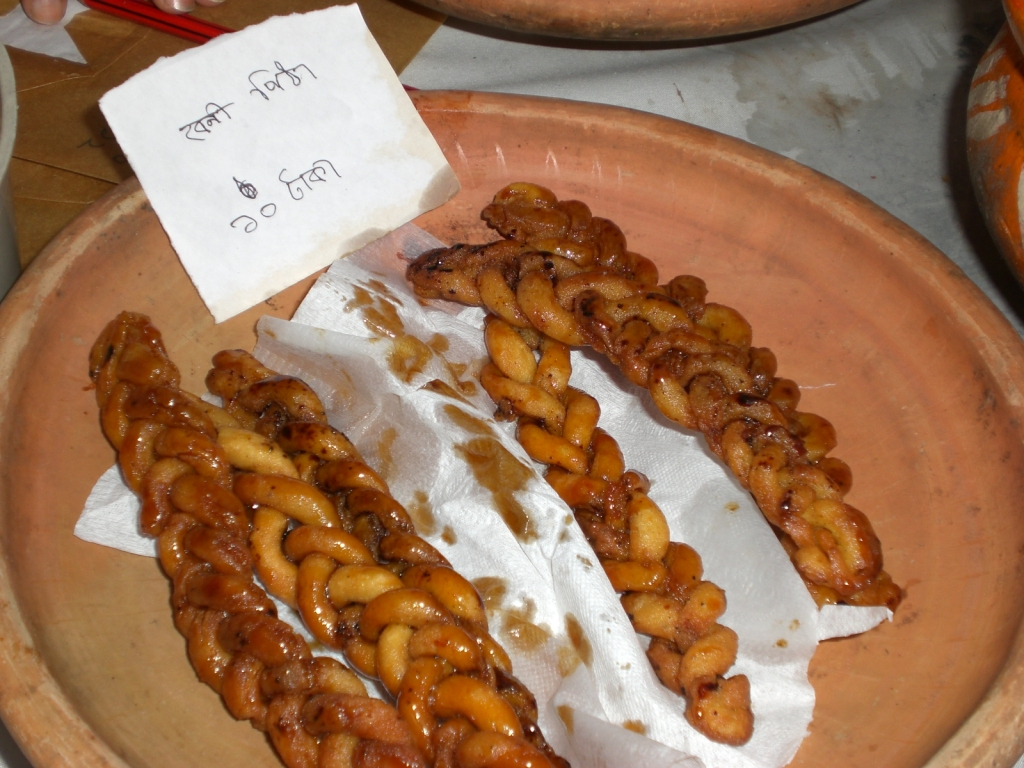

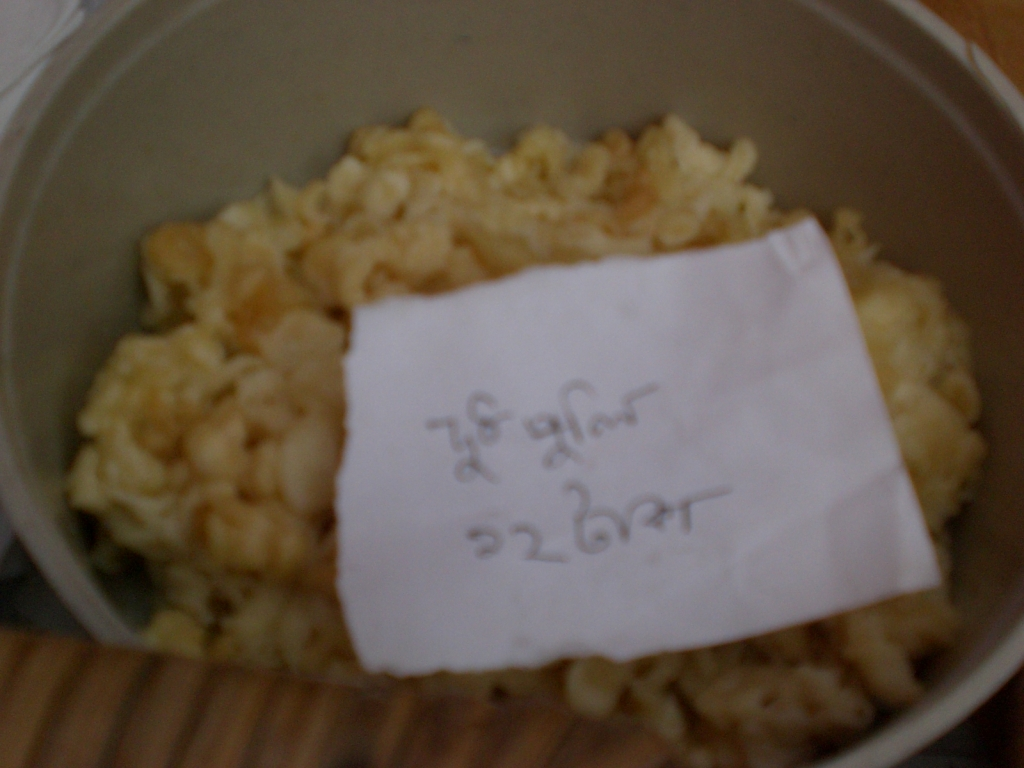

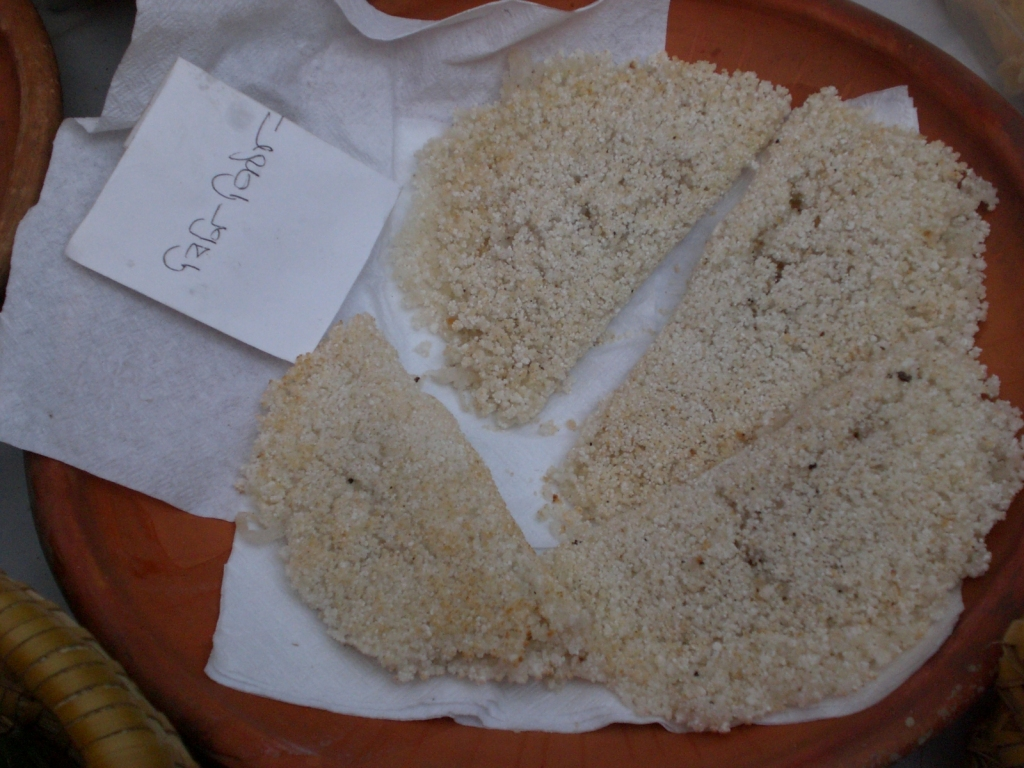

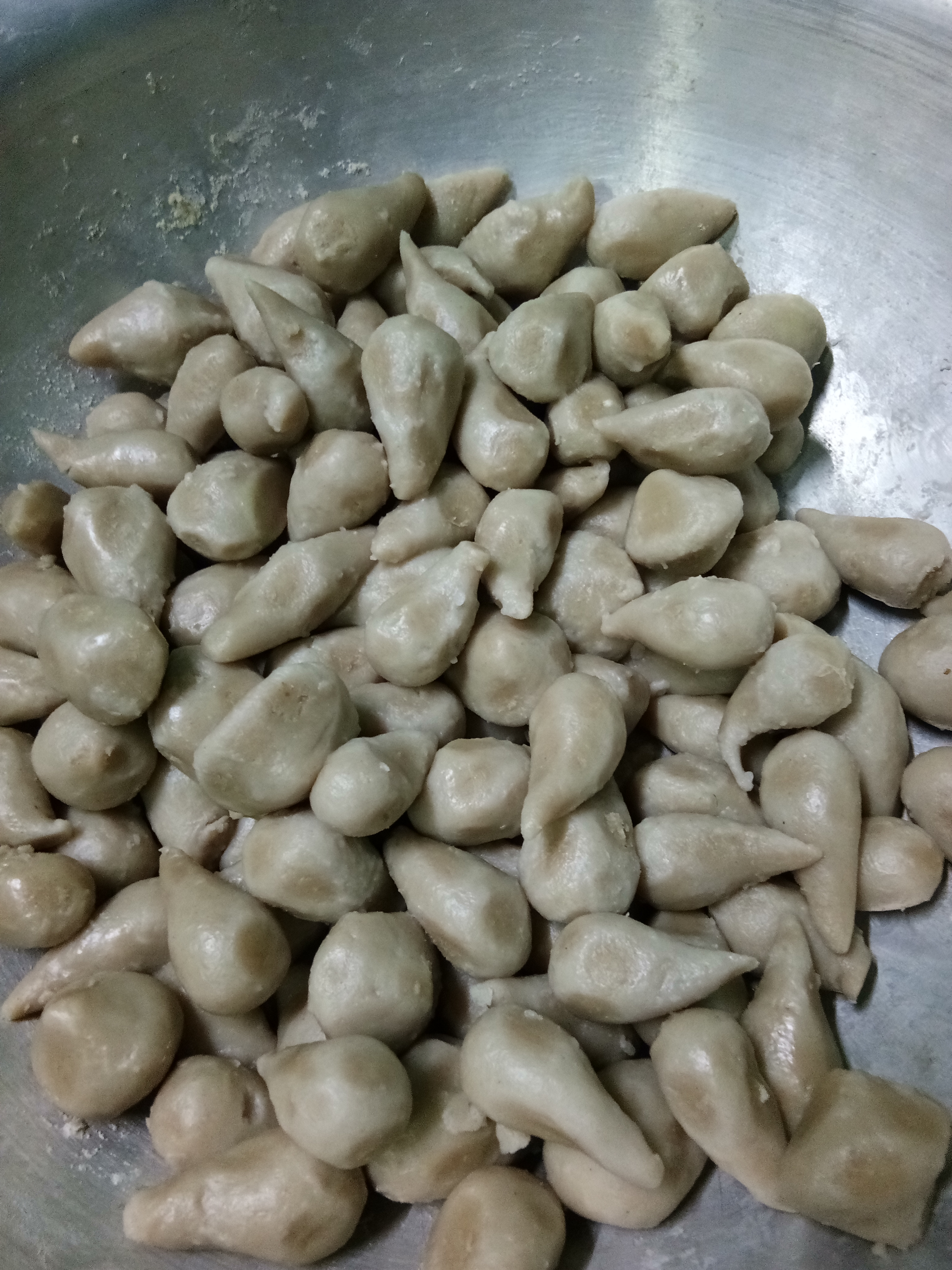
Choi pitha

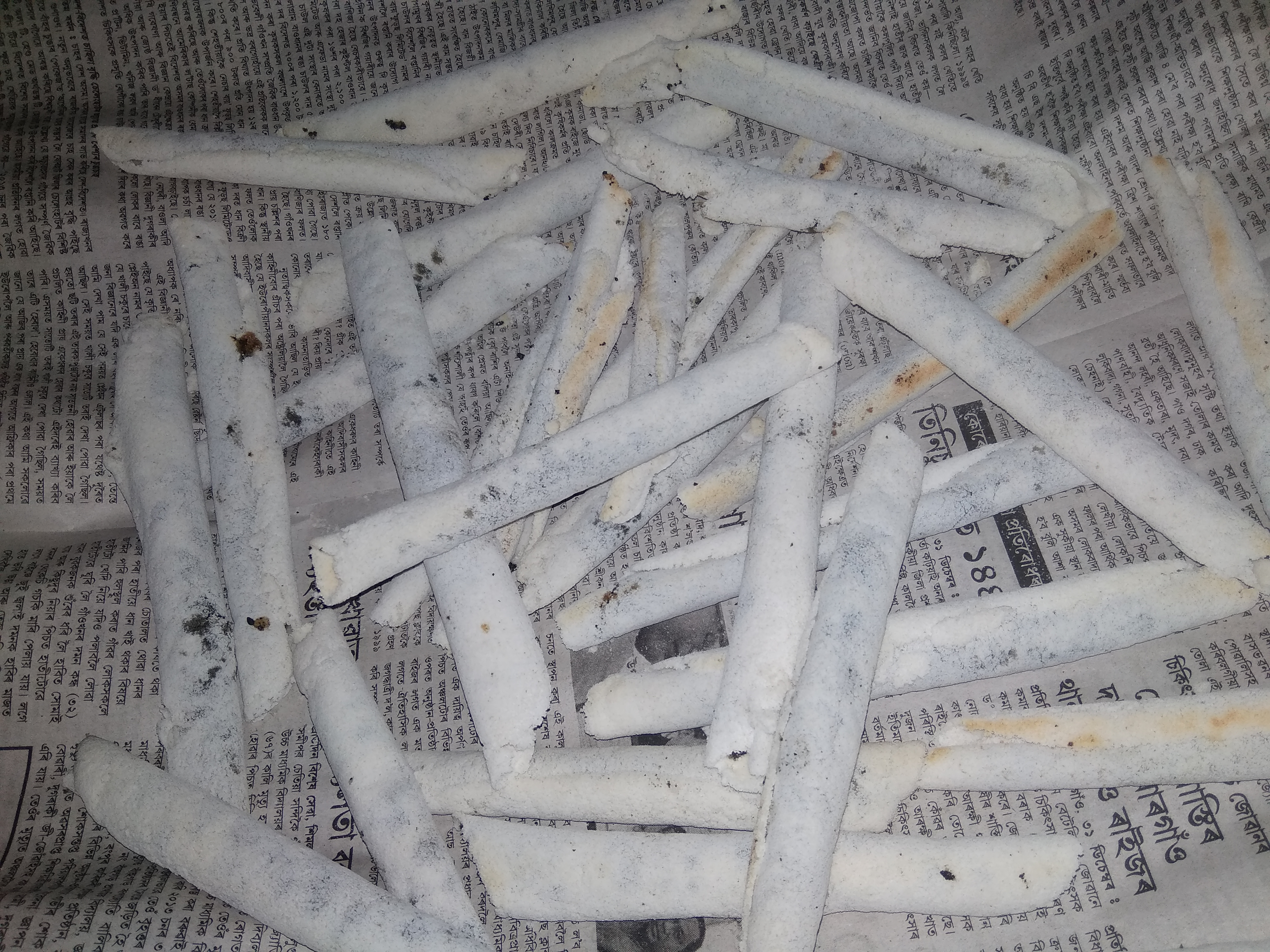

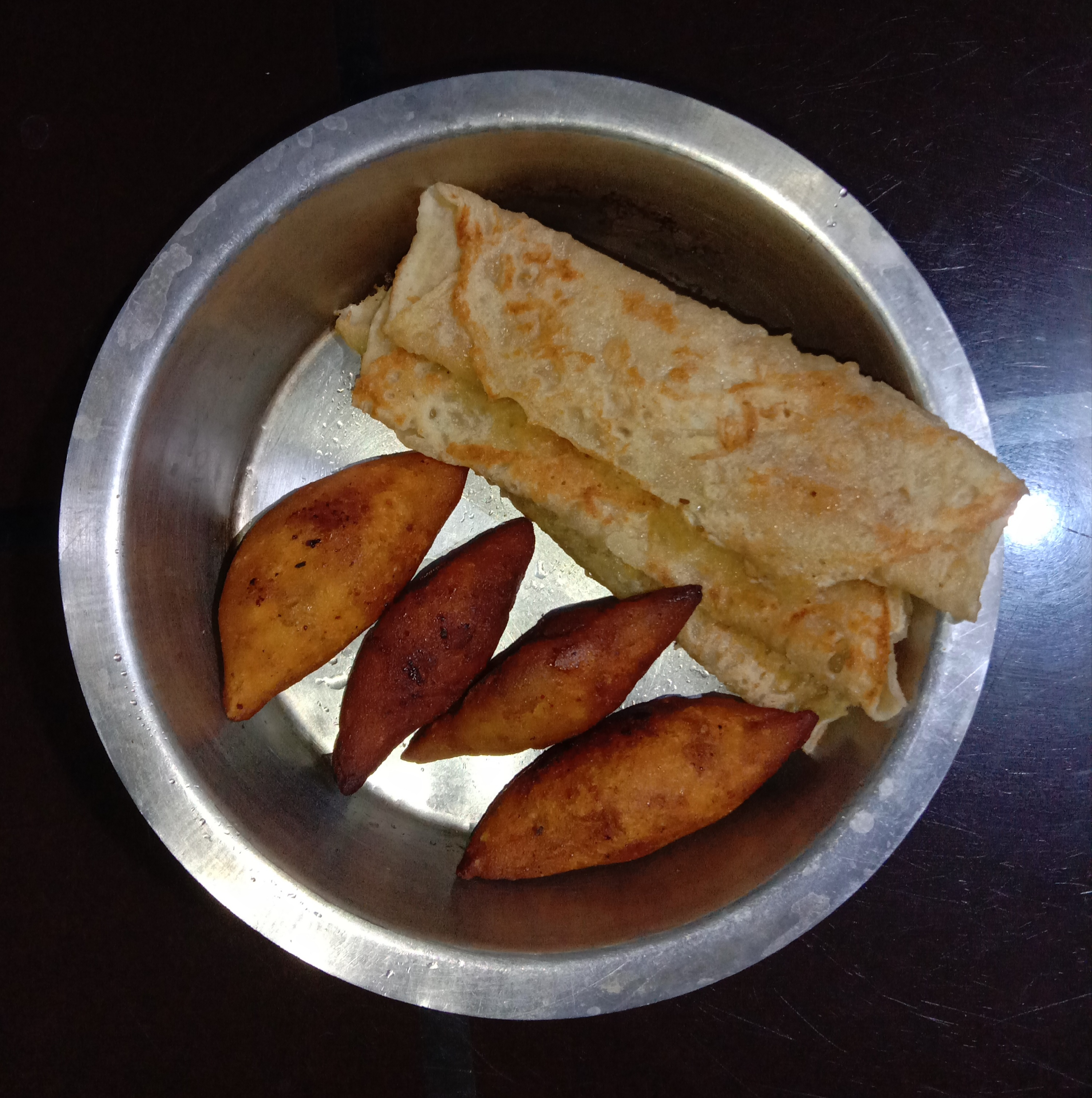

== See also ==
- List of Indian breads
- List of steamed foods
