= Patisapta =

Bengali sweet dish

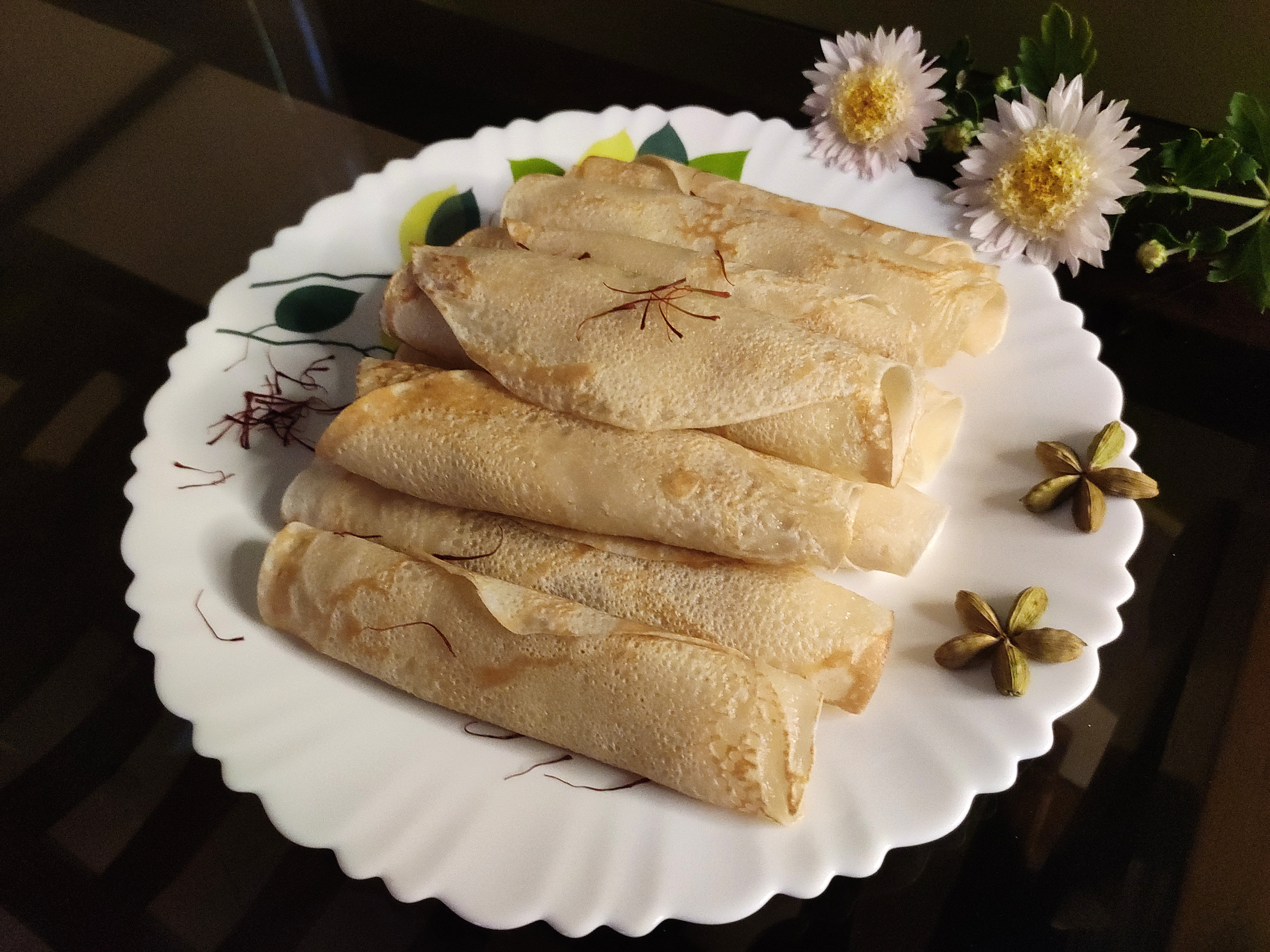
- Patishapata made of kheer with cardamom, saffron and flower decorations in Berhampore, West Bengal.
- Course: Snack, breakfast
- Place of origin: Indian subcontinent
- Associated cuisine: Bangladesh, India
- Main ingredients: Rice flour, coconut, Jaggery

Patisapta pitha is a traditional Bengali sweet dish usually made during winters. It is a type of pitha made from rice flour, and is often filled with coconut, jaggery or sweetened condensed milk. Both coconut and kheer are used as fillings for patisapta.

Patisapta is mentioned in the Chandikavya written by the poet Mukundaram Chakrabarti in the late 16th century.
