= Handesh =

Bengali Eid pastry

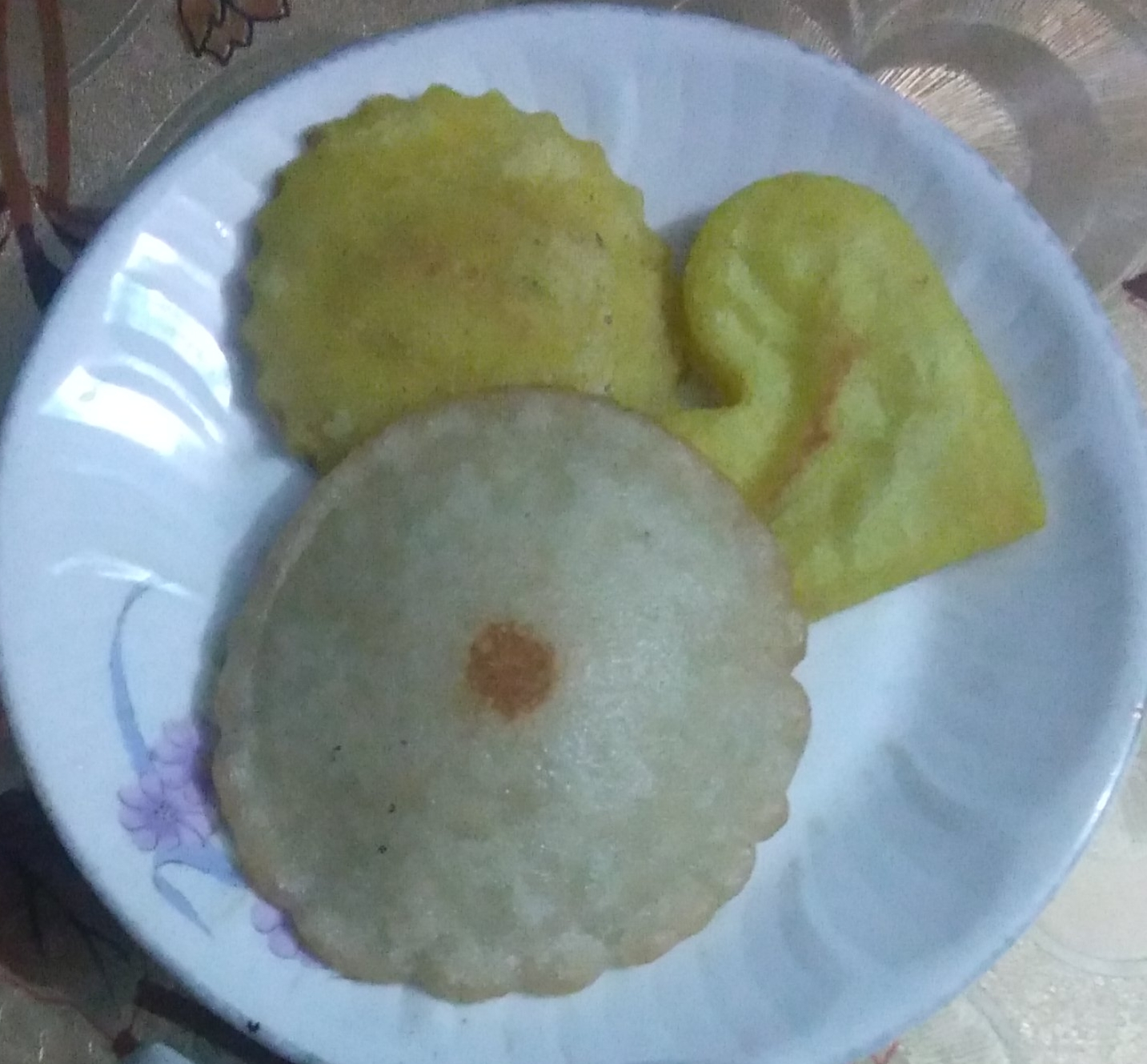
- Sugary Handesh and Nungora
- Alternative names: Teler pitha (in Bengal region)
- Type: Dessert
- Course: Breakfast and light refreshment
- Place of origin: Bangladesh, India
- Region or state: Sylhet region
- Main ingredients: Molasses or sugar and rice flour

Handesh (also known as Guror Sandesh), known as Teler pitha in Bangla, is a sweet and puffy deep-fried Pitha from the Sylhet region of Bangladesh and Karimganj district of Assam in India. It is eaten both as dessert or as a snack. It is a deep-fried molasses and rice flour cake. It is very popular at the time of the Eid. In the earlier days, like other Pithas, this delicacy used to be made from rice threshed by the unmotorized Dheki. It can be eaten with tea as a snack. It is also famous on special occasions such as naming ceremonies and wedding festivities. In Assam, India Its called Tel Pitha.

== Ingredients ==
Molasses or sugar, rice flour, plain flour, water and oil.

== Method ==
Molasses or sugar is added to a large mixing bowl when water is poured at the same time. There are different types of molasses. Rice flour and plain flour are added to make a smooth batter. The batter is thoroughly whisked until it is smooth. Then oil is poured to deep-fry. Once the oil is hot, the heat is reduced to low–medium. Finally, the batter is dropped one by one to the oil to make the Handesh.

== See also ==
- Bangladeshi cuisine
