= Nakshi Pitha =

Type of pitha from Bangladesh

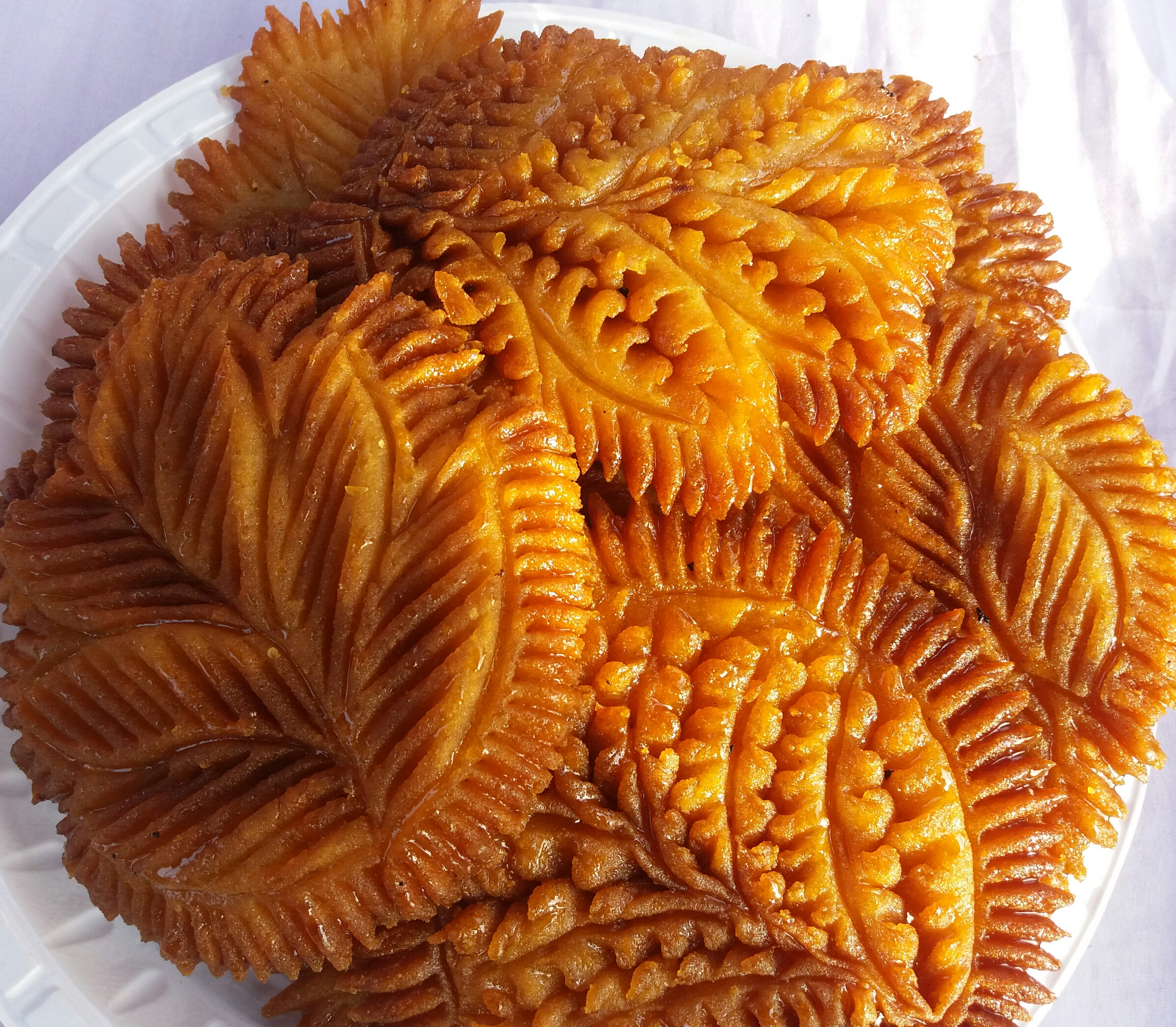
- Alternative names: Pakkon Pitha
- Type: Pitha
- Place of origin: Bangladesh
- Region or state: Narsingdi, Dhaka, Bangladesh
- Associated cuisine: Bangladeshi
- Main ingredients: Rice flour
- Ingredients generally used: Palm thorn, molasses

Nakshi Pitha (Bengali: নকশি পিঠা, lit. 'Designed cake') or Pakkon Pitha is a type of pitha made from rice flour. It is originally from Bangladesh. Various designs are made on the body of this pitha.

== Origin ==
This pitha originated in the Narsingdi District in the Bengal region. The women of this district were considered to be skilled but could not show their talent due to neglect. Due to the lack of education, they did not get the opportunity to create works of art. Legend has it that during the British period, the residents of a village on the banks of the Meghna River in that district used to make art works using rice powder. A girl made a cake like Nakshi pitha in imitation of that artwork. The 13-year-old girl's cooking style of pitha was modified and expanded in various ways to make the present Nakshi pitha.

== Variation ==
As part of the folk art of Bangladesh, this Nakshi Pitha is designed in different ways. These designs are made on the pitha using moulds. Its varieties include Sankhlata, Kajalalata, Chiral or Chiranpata, Hijalpata, Sajnepata, Uriaful, Bent or Vat flower, Padmadighi, Sagardighi, Sarpus, Champabaran, Kanyamukha, Jamimukha, Jamaimuchra, Satinmuchra etc.

== Celebration ==
Nakshi pitha is usually served as a gift or as an invitation dish in various festivals. Pitha festival is organized in Bangladesh every year on the occasion of Poush Sankranti. At that time, 130 types of Nakshi pitha are brought to the fair.

== See also ==
- Chitoi pitha
