= Kansat =

Sweet food from West Bengal, India

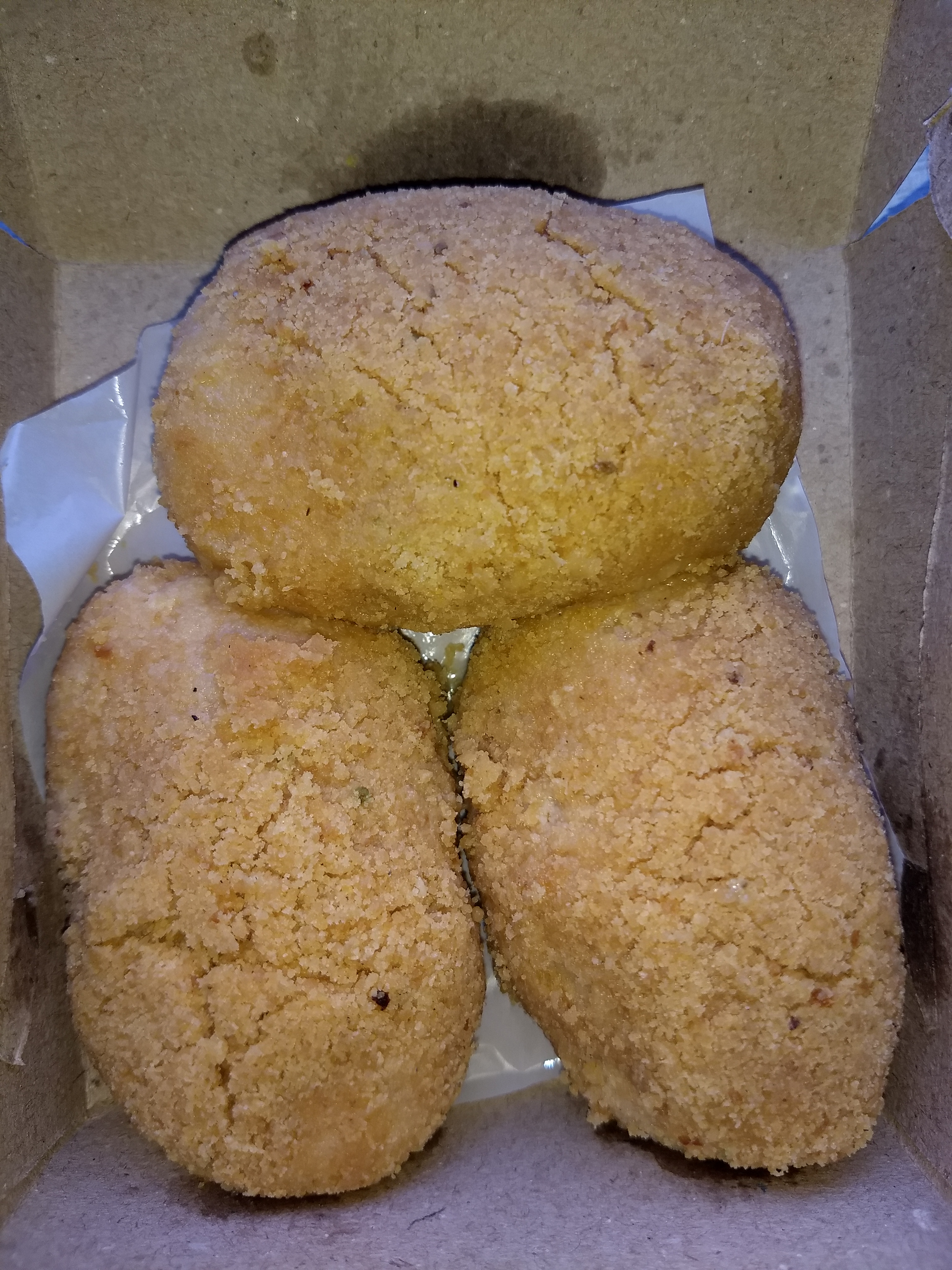
- Kansat of Malda
- Alternative names: মালদার কানসাট
- Place of origin: Bengal region of the Indian subcontinent
- Region or state: Malda, West Bengal, India
- Created by: Mahendra lal Saha, Bijoy Kumar Saha
- Serving temperature: Room Temperature
- Main ingredients: Chana, Kheer

Kansat (Bengali: কানসাট) is an Indian sweet from Malda, West Bengal, India. Kansat is made from chhena.
