= Nunor Bora =

Rice flour snack from Bangladesh

Nunor bora
- Alternative names: Nunor Bora, Nunor Fita, Lobonor Fita and Lobonor Bora
- Type: savoury
- Course: Breakfast and light refreshment
- Place of origin: Bangladesh
- Region or state: Sylhet Division
- Main ingredients: onion, ginger, rice flour and turmeric

Nunor Bora (Sylheti: ꠘꠥꠘꠞ ꠛꠠꠣ), also known as Nungora, Nunor Fita, Nuner Bora, Lobonor Fita, and Lobonor Bora is a savoury rice flour snack made of onions and ginger. Usually, turmeric is added, and gives the snack a golden appearance. It is a traditional and a popular Pitha in the Sylhet Division and Barak Valley. It is often eaten as a snack, with tea, and is very popular at Eid.

== Ingredients ==
Onions, ginger, salt, turmeric, panch puran (optional), rice flour, ground rice, chopped coriander (optional) and water.

== Method ==
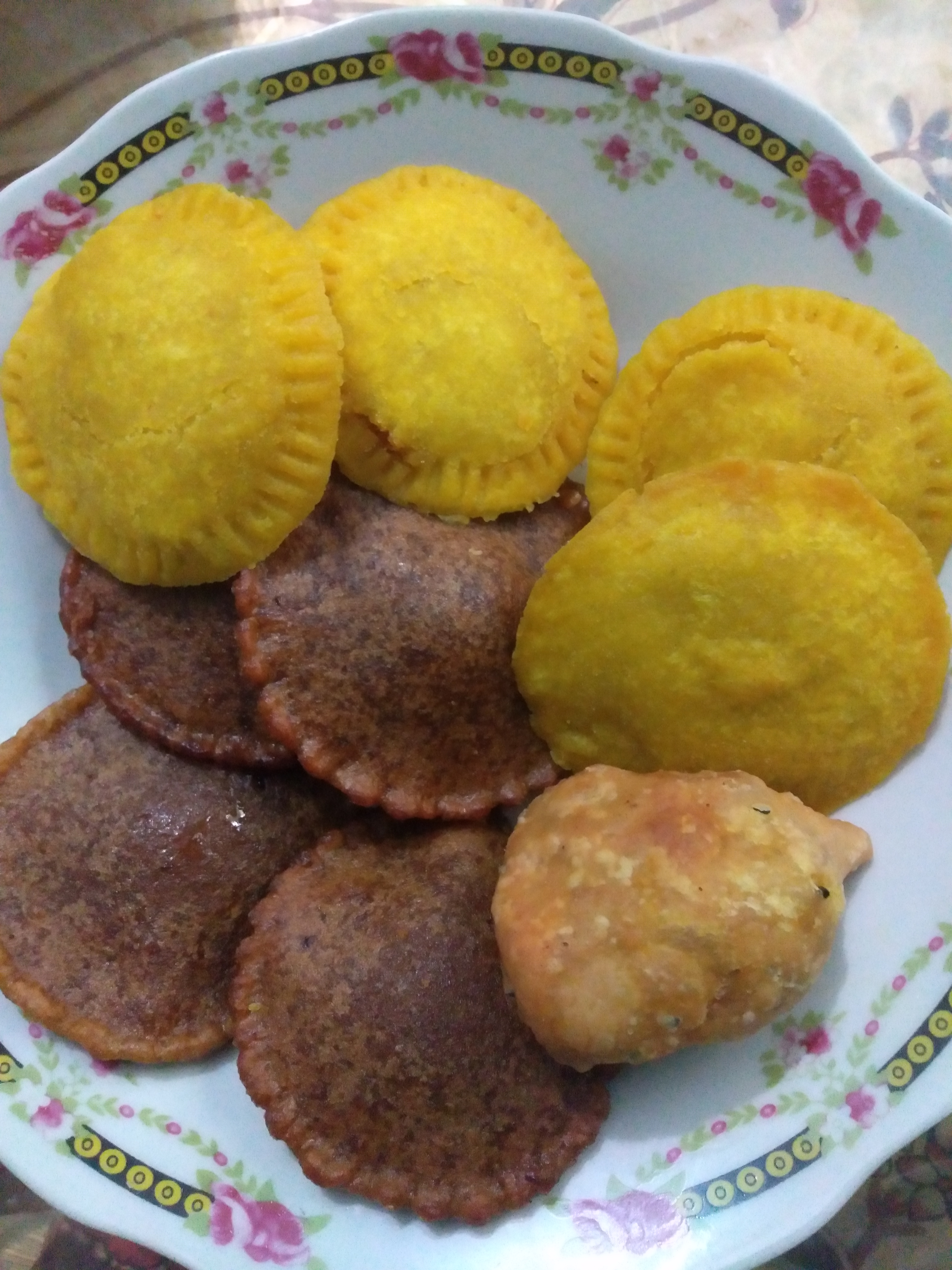
Nunor Bora and Handesh

Nunor Bora are made by adding blended onion, ginger, and garlic to a large saucepan of boiling water, alongside some salt and turmeric powder. Sometimes, ground panch puran is added to enhance the taste and aroma.

A combination of rice flour and/or ground rice is added to the saucepan, forming a spongy soft paste. When the paste is fully cooked, it is removed from the saucepan and left to cool. The paste is mixed into a dough, which is usually shaped into a ball. This ball of dough is flattened to make bread. The bread is cut up into smaller pieces, sometimes in a variety of different shapes. These pieces are either stored for later usage, or deep fried in oil to make edible rice cakes. These are the Nunor Bora.

== See also ==
- Pitha
- Bangladeshi cuisine
