= Kholajali Pitha =

Bangladeshi rice flour cake

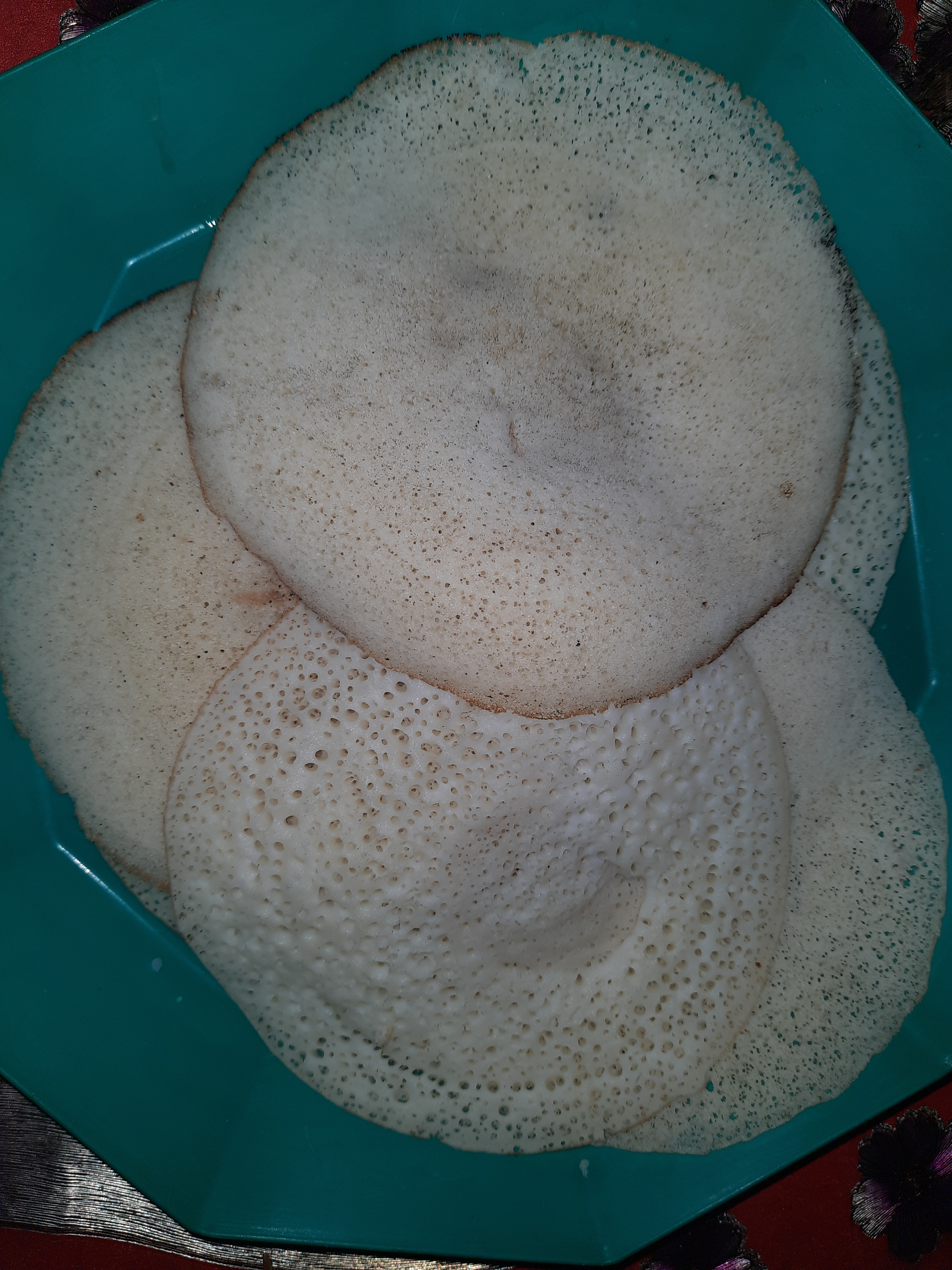
- Traditional Kholajali Pitha of Noakhali
- Alternative names: Kholaja Pitha, Khola Pitha, Khola Citoi, Patla Citoi
- Type: Pitha
- Course: Snacks
- Place of origin: Noakhali, Bangladesh
- Region or state: Noakhali, Feni, Lakshmipur, Comilla, Sitakunda, Mirsharai, Sandwip
- Associated cuisine: Bangladesh
- Serving temperature: Fish, Meat, Chutney, Date Juice, or Dal
- Main ingredients: Rice Grain, Egg
- Variations: Citoi Pitha, Chita Pitha

Kholajali Pitha, Kholaja Pitha, or Khola Pitha is a type of rice flour cake originating from the Noakhali region of southeastern Bangladesh. This traditional pitha is widely popular not only in the greater Noakhali region including Noakhali, Feni, and Lakshmipur districts but also in some neighboring areas of Comilla and Chittagong districts. Traditionally, this pitha is prepared in a clay mold or earthen pan called a khola. This white-colored pitha is circular in shape, filled with numerous tiny holes, and may have either a crispy or soft and fluffy texture.

This pitha closely resembles another traditional Bangladeshi pitha known as Chitoi pitha. Kholajali Pitha is considered a thinner version of Chitoi pitha. For this reason, it is also referred to as "thin Chitoi." It also bears similarities to the popular South Indian dish dosa.

== Name ==
Kholajali Pitha is prepared on a type of earthen griddle called a "khola". This pitha contains numerous tiny holes, giving it a net-like appearance. These two characteristics are the reason behind the name "Kholajali Pitha". It is also known as Kholaja Pitha or Khola Pitha. In the Noakhali dialect, it is called "Kholajali Hida." Because of its close similarity in appearance and taste to "Chitoi Pitha", Kholajali Pitha is also referred to as Thin Chitoi, Khola Chitoi, or Dim Chitoi.

== Ingredients ==
For the pitha dough

- Rice flour
- Egg
- Solt
- Hot water

Additionally, chopped coriander leaves, onions, green chillies, or grated coconut may also be added if desired.

For making Pitha:

- Earthen griddle (khola)
- Round ladle

== Preparation ==
First, rice flour and salt are mixed together to prepare a moderately thin batter or mixture. The process of preparing this batter or dough is very important for making the pitha. It should be neither too thick nor too thin. Then eggs are added to the mixture. The more eggs used, the tastier and softer the pitha becomes. After adding the eggs, the mixture is stirred again thoroughly. If the batter seems too thick, a little water may be added gradually to thin it out.

Next, the earthen khola (griddle) is heated on the stove, which is also a very important step in making the pitha. Once the khola is properly heated, the prepared batter is poured onto it using a round ladle and spread evenly in a circular motion. Then it is covered with a lid. After a short while, when the edges of the pitha begin to lift from the khola, it is removed using a thin spatula. In this way, the traditional Kholajali Pitha of the Noakhali region is prepared.

== Serving ==
Kholajali Pitha may be served with any kind of fish curry, beef, or mutton, as well as with chicken or duck curry. It can also be served with molasses or date palm sap, which is a very traditional way of enjoying it.

== Variations ==
Kholajali Pitha can also be considered a thinner version of Chitoi Pitha. However, Chitoi Pitha is comparatively much thicker. In addition, Kholajali Pitha also has a strong similarity to another pitha called "Chhita Pitha."
