= Kheer (Bengali sweets) =

Bengali milk-based sweet and ingredient in sweets

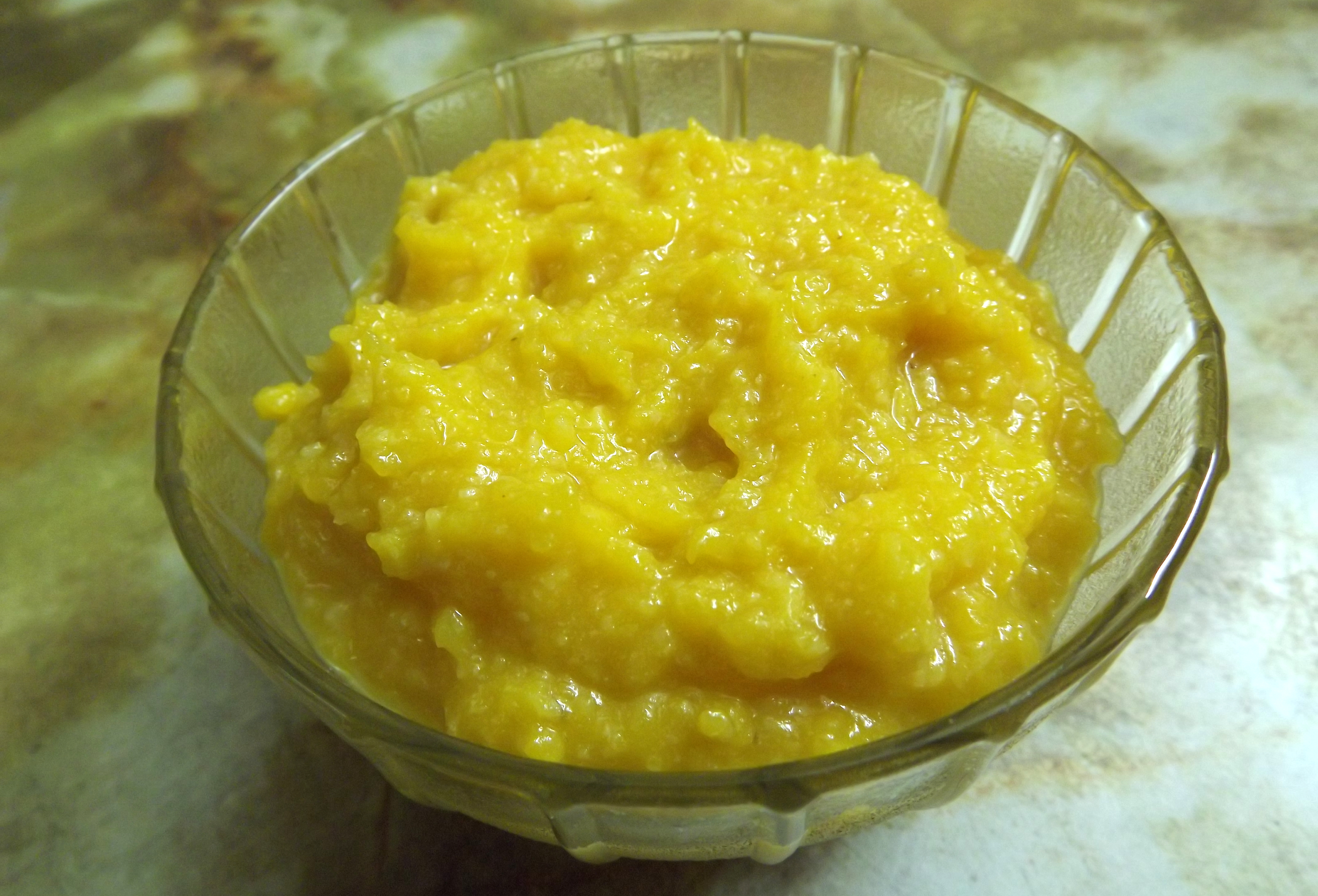
- Bengali Kheer flavoured with Palmyra fruit
- Alternative names: Meowa, Kheersha
- Course: Dessert
- Place of origin: Bengal
- Region or state: Bangladesh, West Bengal
- Associated cuisine: Bengal
- Serving temperature: Room Temperature
- Main ingredients: Cow's milk
- Similar dishes: Khoa

Kheer or Meoa (Bengali: ক্ষীর) is a sweet from the Bengal region of the Indian subcontinent. It is not only a sweet by itself, but it is also used as the main ingredient of many other sweets. In North India, Kheer (Payesam) is a type of rice pudding. But in Bengal, in the same spelling and sound, Kheer is a completely different dish. It is very similar to the Khoa but with its own distinct flavor and texture. Kheer, a type of evaporated milk, is primarily made using cow or buffalo milk. The process involves boiling pure milk for an extended period, typically over an hour, to reduce it to one-third of its original volume. This concentrated form of milk is known as Kheer. Sometimes, ingredients like sugar, arrowroot, or Suji (semolina) are added during boiling to enhance sweetness and create a different flavor profile. However, the traditional version of Kheer, without these additions, is known for its authentic and distinct taste.

== Preparation Process ==
To prepare Kheer (evaporated milk), cow or buffalo milk is the key ingredient. Pure milk is boiled for over an hour to make one-third of its original volume. This is Kheer. Sometimes to make a more sweet and different taste sugar, Arrowroot, Suji are mixed with it during boiling, but the taste of the unadulterated version is very different and tastes more authentic.

To make Khoa, the boiling process is extended to reduce the original volume to a fourth or fifth. Khoa is harder than Kheer. This hardness makes a difference to the taste and is the difference between Khoa (milk solids) and Kheer (evaporated milk).

== Uses ==
As in Bengal, kheer is one of the most important ingredients for making sweets and therefore has a high demand in the market. In terms of hardness, it can be categorized into two forms:

- Khoa – hard kheer
- Kheer – semi-liquid kheer

Khoa is used to make some Bengali sweets like kansat.

Kheer is used for Rosmalai like sweets, where small balls of chhena are immersed in kheer.

== Some related sweets ==
- Kheerkadam (ক্ষীরকদম) A sweet from Meherpur district of Khulna division, Bangladesh.
- Kansat (An Indian sweet)
- 'Kheer er borfi' (ক্ষীরের বরফি) A barfi made out of kheer
- 'Pat kheer' (পাতক্ষীর) originated from Bikrampur

== Kheer in literature ==
Abanindranath Tagore wrote a story of two queens of a King, titled as Kheer er putul, means a doll made with kheer. In this story, one queen made her virtual son with Kheer and sent for marriage. Somehow Shathi Thakur (a Goddess) ate it but was captured as she stole this doll, and in reply she gave a son to that queen.

== In idioms ==
There is a Bengali idioms circulated in Bengal i.e.

SOBURE MEOWA FOLE

In Bengali: সবুরে মেওয়া ফলে

Means if you keep your patience in your work then you must see the success, as after devoting over an hour to boil milk to make delicious kheer. This idiom is customary to Bengali people and is used very often to advise someone.
