= Chhadakhai =

Festival of Odisha, India

- Official name: Chhadakhai
- Begins: Next day of Kartik Purnima

Chhadakhai is a ritual of Odisha celebrated on the next day of Kartik Purnima. Kartik month is considered a pious month and a lot of people do not consume non-veg food during this month. Chhadakhai word means having some food after a duration. Since people do not consume non-veg for the whole month of Kartik, they like to consume non-veg food on the very next day, Kartik month ends.

Historically, the ritual began with the Bali Jatra festivities. As per the old Spice Route records, the wind changed its direction around this time. So the sailors, fishermen and traders set out for their voyage during this time. The farewell to the sailors, fishermen and traders were celebrated with a big feast constituting a lot of varieties of non-veg food. During mid-November the meat used to be better and the fish would move towards the coast. Many historians feel this could be the beginning of the ritual.
