= Boita =

Ships built in the ancient Kalinga region

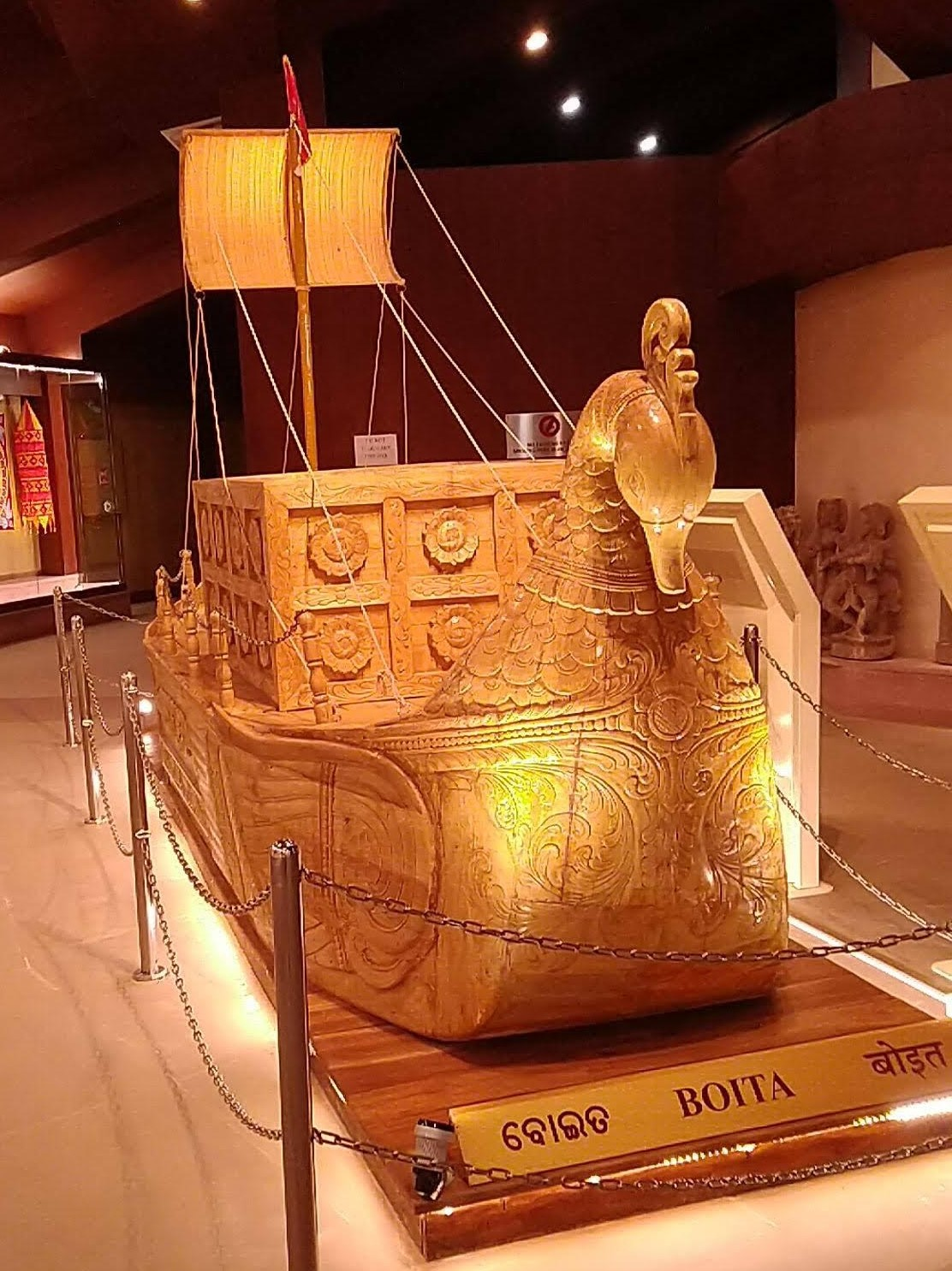
Model of a Boita at Konark ASI Museum

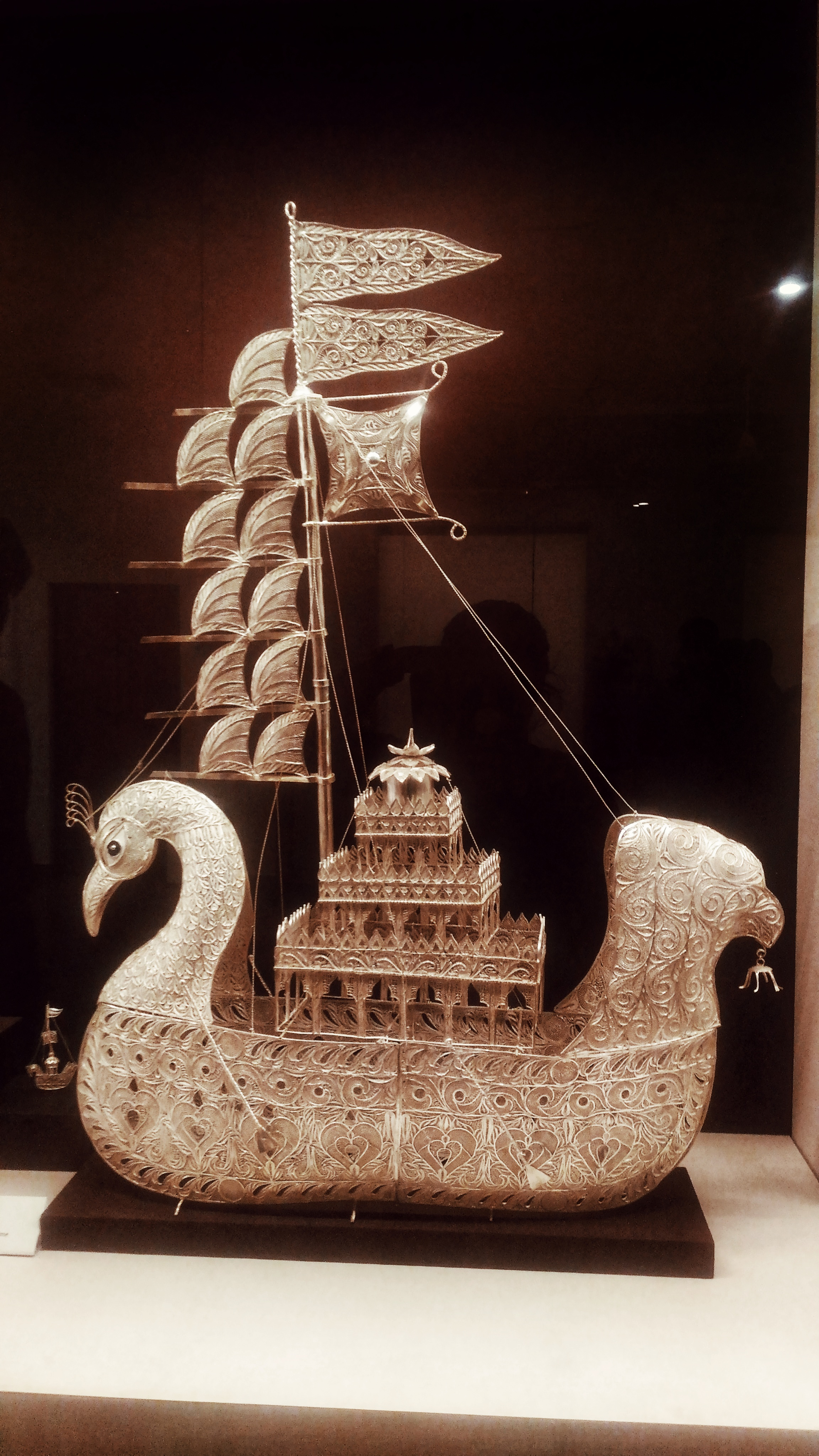
Silver filigree of a boita at Odisha Crafts Museum

Boitas (Odia: ବୋଇତ) were larger boats and ships that were built in the ancient Kalinga region during its maritime history. Kalinga's sea facing regions consisting of coastal Odisha had major trading ports for which boitas were used. Ancient Sadhabas (mariner merchants) sailed from Kalinga to distant lands such of Sri Lanka and South-East Asia including both mainland and insular Southeast Asian regions for trade.

== Construction ==
Rules and regulations regarding construction of ships were recorded in the Sanskrit text Yuktikalpataru (ଯୁକ୍ତିକଲ୍ପତରୁ Juktikalpataru) authored by King Bhoja. The Madalapanji (ମାଦଳପାଞ୍ଜି) records that king Bhoja built many ships with local wood. The recovery of many woodworking adzes and other artifacts from Chilika Lake (ଚିଲିକା) shows that Golabai was a boat-building center.

=== Yuktikalpataru ===
The treatise Yuktikalpataru has sections on ships which deals with classification and characteristics of ship building such as varieties of woods best suited for construction of ships, the classification of vessels for river-going(sāmānya) and sea-going vessels(viśeṣa), their names and respective measurements, types of decorations and painting of ships, various types of ship cabins etc.

=== Wood for the construction of ships ===
For the construction of ships, four kinds of woods were distinguished.

- Brahmajati: this group consists of wood that is light and soft and can easily be joined to any other kind of wood.
- Kshetrahati: the wood is light and hard but cannot be joined on to other woods
- Vaisyajati: the wood is soft and heavy
- Sudrajati: the wood is characterised by both hardness and heaviness
- Dvijati: the wood is of mixed variety which has blended properties of two separate groups

The text also mentions that iron was not used in sea-going vessels, hence referring to dominance of stitched sewn boats, where the hulls were stitched together with a rope rather than nailed across a frame.

=== Classification of Ships ===
The ships are classified into two groups:

- river-going or ordinary called sāmānya (ସାମାନ୍ୟ)
- sea-going or special called viśeṣa (ବିଶେଷ)

The names and measurements of the two classified groups of ships are as follows:

==== Riverine/river-going/ordinary ships (Sāmānya) ====
The ships used in river traffic or waterways fall in this class. It is divided into ten groups with different dimensions.

Name	Length in ft (m)	Breadth in ft (m)	Height in ft (m)
kṣudra (କ୍ଷୁଦ୍ର)	24 (7.32)	6 (1.83)	6 (1.83)
madhyamā (ମଧ୍ୟମା)	36 (10.97)	28 (8.53)	12 (3.66)
bhimā (ଭିମା)	60 (18.29)	30 (9.14)	30 (9.14)
capalā (ଚପଲା)	72 (21.95)	36 (10.97)	36 (10.97)
paṭalā (ପଟଲା)	96 (29.26)	48 (14.63)	48 (14.63)
bhayā (ଭୟା)	108 (32.92)	54 (16.46)	54 (16.46)
dīrghā (ଦୀର୍ଘା)	132 (40.23)	66 (20.12)	66 (20.12)
patrapuṭā (ପତ୍ରପୁଟା)	144 (43.89)	72 (21.95)	72 (21.95)
garbharā (ଗର୍ଭରା)	168 (51.21)	84 (25.6)	84 (25.6)
mantharā (ମନ୍ଥରା)	180 (54.86)	90 (27.43)	90 (27.43)

==== Marine/sea-going/special ships (Viśeṣa) ====
The sea-going or special ships are divided into two categories:

- dīrghā (ଦୀର୍ଘା)- noted for their length
- unnatā (ଉନ୍ନତା)- noted for their height

dīrghā type
Name	Length in ft (m)	Breadth in ft (m)	Height in ft (m)
dīrghikā (ଦୀର୍ଘିକା)	48 (14.63)	6 (1.83)	4.5 (1.37)
taraṇī (ତରଣୀ)	72 (21.95)	9 (2.74)	6 (1.83)
lolā (ଲୋଲା)	96 (29.26)	12 (3.66)	9 (2.74)
gatvarā (ଗତ୍ୱରା)	120 (36.58)	15 (4.57)	12 (3.66)
gāminī (ଗାମିନୀ)	144 (43.89)	18 (5.49)	13.5 (4.11)
tarī (ତରୀ)	168 (51.21)	21 (6.4)	16.5 (5.03)
jaṅghālā (ଜଙ୍ଗାଲା)	192 (58.52)	24 (7.32)	18 (5.49)
plāvinī (ପ୍ଲାବିନୀ)	216 (65.84)	27 (8.23)	21 (6.4)
dhāriṇī (ଧାରିଣୀ)	240 (73.15)	30 (9.14)	24 (7.32)
veginī (ବେଗିନୀ)	264 (80.47)	33 (10.06)	25.5 (7.77)

unnatā type
Name	Length in ft (m)	Breadth in ft (m)	Height in ft (m)
ūrddhavā (ଊର୍ଦ୍ଧବା)	48 (14.63)	24 (7.32)	24 (7.32)
anūrddhavā (ଅନୁର୍ଦ୍ଧବା)	72 (21.95)	36 (10.97)	36 (10.97)
svarṇamukhī (ସ୍ୱର୍ଣମୁଖୀ)	96 (29.26)	48 (14.63)	48 (14.63)
garbhiṇī (ଗର୍ଭିଣୀ)	120 (36.58)	60 (18.29)	60 (18.29)
mantharā (ମନ୍ଥରା)	144 (43.89)	72 (21.95)	72 (21.95)

=== Decoration and painting of Ships ===
Yuktikalpataru also gives elaborate directions for decorating and furnishing of ships.

==== Metals used for decorations ====
Kinds of Metals recommended for decorative purposes:

- Gold
- Silver
- Copper
- Compound of all above three

==== Colours ====
Types of colours recommended for the types of vessels(with masts):

Vessel(with masts)	Colour
Vessel with 4 masts	White
Vessel with 3 masts	Red
Vessel with 2 masts	Yellow
Vessel with 1 mast	Blue

==== Ship prow and body section decorations ====
The prows of the ships are also decorated with a great variety of fanciful shapes and forms like the heads of lion, buffalo, serpent, elephant, tiger, birds such as duck, peahen or parrot, frog and human. After painting the ship with the respective colour with regards to the mast, the body of the ship is then painted with pictures of celestial bodies such as sun, moon etc., deities, swan, peacock, parrot, lion, elephant, serpent, tiger and bees.

Other decorations used on the ships include thin sheets of metal on all sides (such ships are called kamalā), with a type of avājñāsika cloth (composed of mixed white, red, spotted yellow, black colours), decked with pearls (ships resembled the umbrella of navadaṇḍa type) and garlands of gold are also attached and hung from the ships.

=== Ship cabin types ===
Three classes of ships are classified according to the length and position of the cabins.

- Sarvamandirā (ସର୍ବମନ୍ଦିରା)
- Madhyamandirā (ମଧ୍ୟମନ୍ଦିରା)
- Agramandirā (ଅଗ୍ରମନ୍ଦିରା)

Ship with cabin type	Feature	Function
Sarvamandirā	largest cabins, extending from one end of the ship to the other	goods, animals, passengers
Madhyamandirā	cabins located in the middle part	suitable during rainy season, royal voyages
Agramandirā	cabins located towards the prow section	convenient during dry season and also for long voyages, used by navies

== Depictions ==
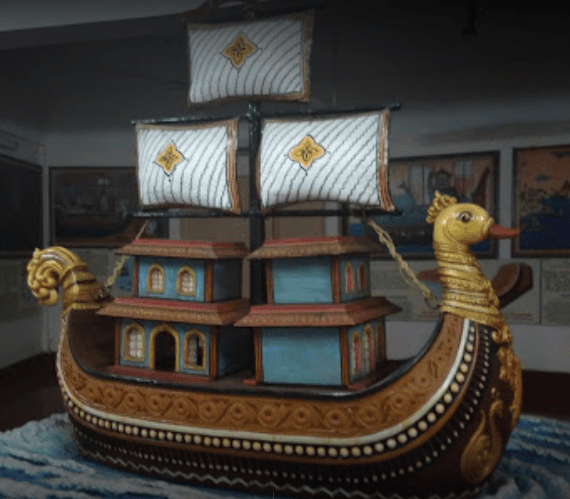
Boita replica at Odisha Maritime museum

Terracotta seals from Bangarh and Chandraketugarh (400–100 BCE) depict sea going vessels carrying containing corn. The ships have a single mast with a square sail. The earliest depiction of ships in Odisha is in a sculptured frieze showing two ships, found near the Brahmeswara Temple, Bhubaneswar, and now preserved in the Odisha State Museum. The first ship has standing elephants in the front part, two people seated in the center and two sailor with oars at the rear steering the ship.

A temple in Bhubaneswar called Vaital Deula named after the shape of its roof, which resembles an overturned boat. According to scholars, the name is derived from Vaita Kakhara, also called Vaitalu or Vaital, hence the phonetics deriving from Boita. The Lingaraj Temple of Bhubaneswar has a representation of a boat being steered with an oar by a woman, dated to the 11th century CE. A sculpture from Konark in the 13th century CE shows a boat rowed by four people, with a cabin in the center in which a man is seated, armed with a bow and arrow. A boat depicted in the Sun Temple of Konarak contains a giraffe, indicating trade with Africa.

== Boita Bandana ==
Boita Bandana also known as Danga Bhasa, is a traditional Odia festival celebrated annually throughout Odisha. The name could be translated as "to float ritual boats and worshipping with lighted lamp" and comes from the tradition of making decorated boats, which are then floated on a river as a symbolic gesture of their ancestors' voyage. During the ceremony, men, women and children dressed up in traditional costumes place tiny boats made from banana peels, paper or solapitha with lighted lamps inside and Odia women perform the rite of the festival to pay homage to the Sadhabas (ancient Odia mariner merchants) who embarked on the voyage to distant lands for trade, commerce and cultural exchange. The festival is similar to festivals of Masakapam Kepesih of Bali, Loi Krathong of Thailand and Bon Om Touk of Cambodia, which involve the ritualistic floating of boats lit with lamps held during the full moon day of the same month in the year.

Its major occasion held at Cuttack on the banks of the Mahanadi river is called Bali Jatra which literally means ' A Voyage to Bali', and celebrates the ancient maritime tradition and the connection with Southeast Asia. Miniature Boitas are used today as children's toys during the Odia festival of Bali Jatra.

== Gallery ==
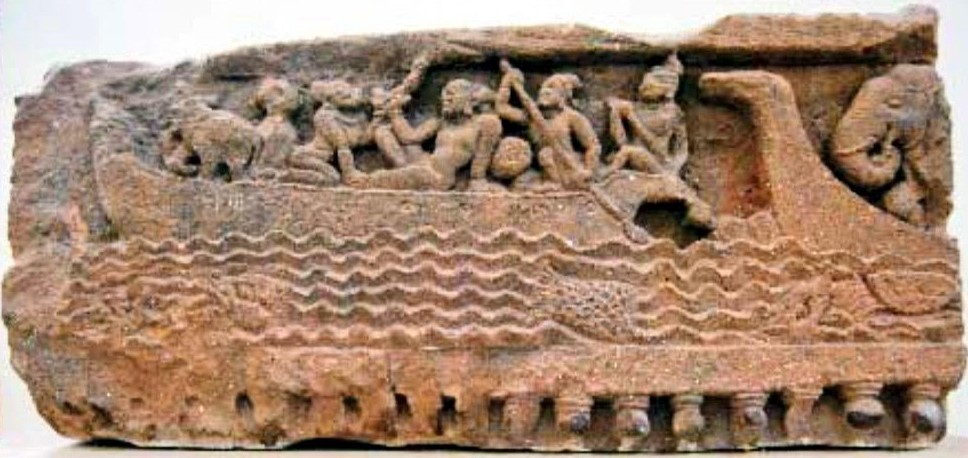
Sculptured frieze depicting two Boitas found near Brahmeswara Temple

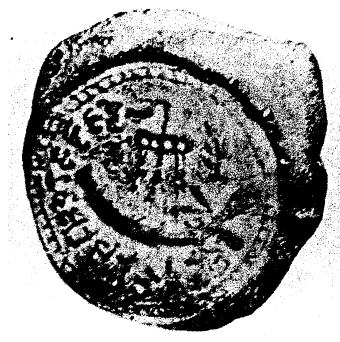
Terracotta seal portraying boita circa 400 BCE–100 BCE

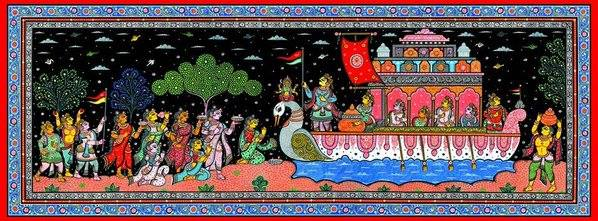
Boita on a Pattachitra painting

== See also ==
- Maritime history of Odisha
- Sadhaba
