= Sadhaba =

Ancient mariners from the Kalinga region

Sadhabas (or Sadhavas) (Odia: ସାଧବ sādhaba) were ancient traders/merchants and mariners from the Kalinga region, which corresponds to modern Odisha, India. They used ships called Boitas to travel to distant lands such as South-East Asia to carry out trade.

The early hours of Kartika Purnima (the full moon day in October and November) was considered an auspicious occasion by the Sadhabas to begin their long voyages. Coconuts, earthenware, sandalwood, cloth, lime, rice, spices, salt, cloves, pumpkins, silk sarees, betel leaves, betel nuts, elephants, precious and semi-precious stones were the main items of trade. Even women went on voyages as well and were known as Sadhabanis (Odia: ସାଧବାଣୀ sādhabāṇī). Odia navigators were instrumental in spreading Buddhism and Hinduism in East and Southeast Asia. In addition, they disseminated knowledge of Indian architecture, epics such as the Ramayana and the Mahabharata, Brahmic scripts writing system and Sanskrit loan words which are present in many Southeast Asian languages from different language families such as Khmer, Thai, Cham, Balinese etc.

Maritime trade declined only in the 16th century, with the decline of the Gajapati Empire.

== Etymology ==
During Silk Road and Maritime Silk Road trade era, two distinct types of trade in the subcontinent were controlled by merchant leaders such as shreshthis and sarthavahas. The shreshthis has their business in the towns and villages and fulfilled the need of the local region while the sarthavahas, also known as caravan leaders, travelled from place to place trading in both indigenous and foreign goods. They controlled both the import and export while also acting as whole-sellers and suppliers to the local shreshthis.

In Kalinga, the merchants who carried on overseas trade were known as sadhabas. It is believed that the word had probably developed out of the word sadhu, which means honest men and its association with byabasaya (business), thus came to be known as sādhavaḥ which meant honest businessmen (sadhu byabasayi). Other scholars argue that sadhaba originates from the word sarthavahas which was also used for the maritime traders in ancient India.

== Merchants ==
=== Description ===
The Sadhabas did not form any particular caste but rather belonged to a class drawn from various castes. No particular community had the distinction of being singularly involved in the process of overseas activities although the vaishyas did have significant association. The people responsible for rowing the boats were known as kandareas or majhis and were generally from lower castes but at later stage with largescale operations, people from higher castes also joined this activity. The titles of Mangaraja, Boitiala, Mahanayaka etc. also denotes entry of kshatriyas as helmsmen and captain of ships.

=== Trade guilds ===
The Eastern Ganga records refer to the following economic trade guilds:

- goldsmiths
- oilmen
- milkmen
- potters
- copper workers
- tambulika (cultivators and sellers of betel)
- bell metal workers
- sellers of sugar
- patakara (splitters or carpenters)
- perfumers
- weavers
- barbers
- craftsmen
- washermen
- workers in conch shells
- fishermen

=== Legacy ===
The Sadhabas had high esteem in the society and are mentioned significantly in the folklores especially that of Ta'apoi and numerous literary works. Their voyages across the ocean is remembered and celebrated in the festival of Boita Bandana held on Kartika Purnima when they used to set sail for trade. The worship of Goddess Mangala as the prime deity of the Sadhabas and their families was important in seeking blessings for good luck, protection of ships, safe return and profitable business due to the fear of shipwrecks and insecurities and fear of unknown duration of the long maritime voyages.

== Post decline in maritime trade ==
Maritime trade declined post the reign of Gajapati Empire and with the rising dominance of European naval powers in Asia, although minor contacts continued under the reign of Bhoi dynasty at Khurda. With the defeat of the Marathas in the Second Anglo-Maratha War in 1803 and the resulting annexation of Odisha into the British Empire, ended whatever remained of the maritime trade links.

After the decline in maritime trade vis-a-vis the modern era, the descendants of the sadhabas returned to their mainstream professions due to changes in social, geopolitical and maritime world order. The title of Sahu, Sabata, Sahukar are likely to have originated from the word sadhaba and is found across Odia communities as the sadhabas were a group of merchants consisting of different communities from different professions.

== Notable people ==
- Kaundinya I – A merchant trader who became the co-founder of the Funan kingdom(centered in modern Cambodia) after he married the local Nāga princess Soma around 1st century CE.

== See also ==
- Boita Bandana
- Bali Jatra
- Boita
- Greater India
- Maritime history of Odisha
