= Leaf boat =

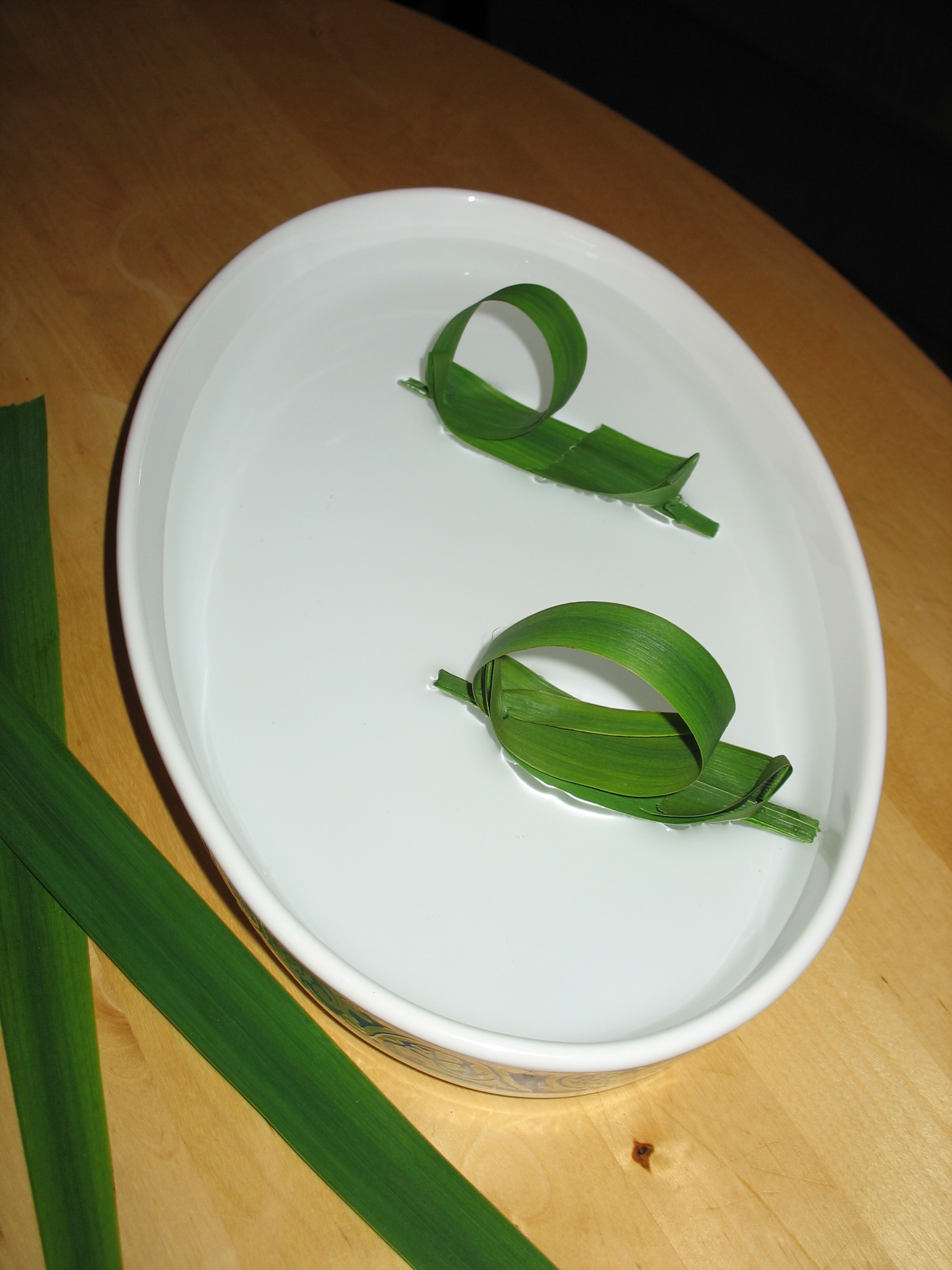
Scottish iris boat with a round sail

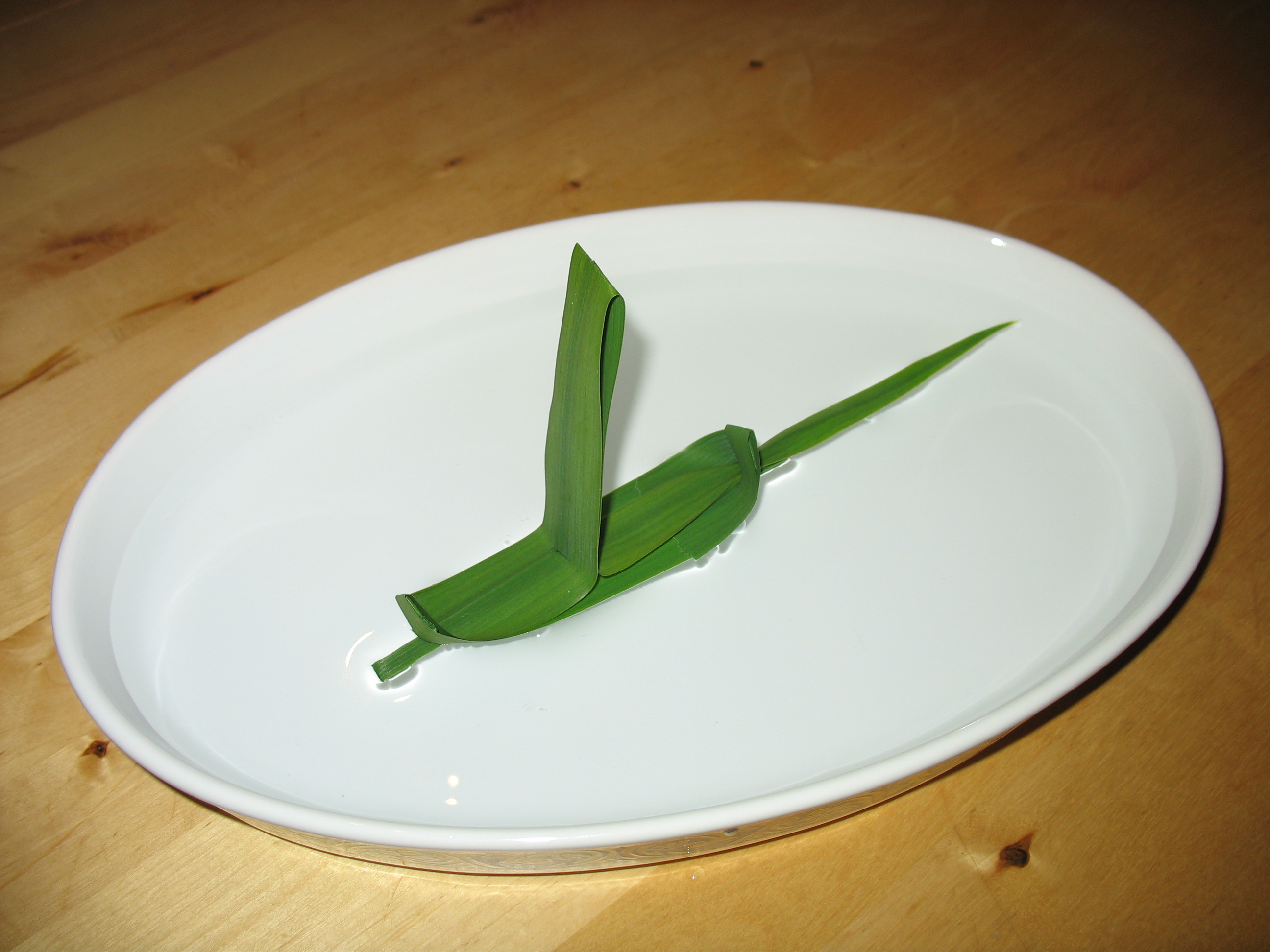
Iris boat with a straight sail

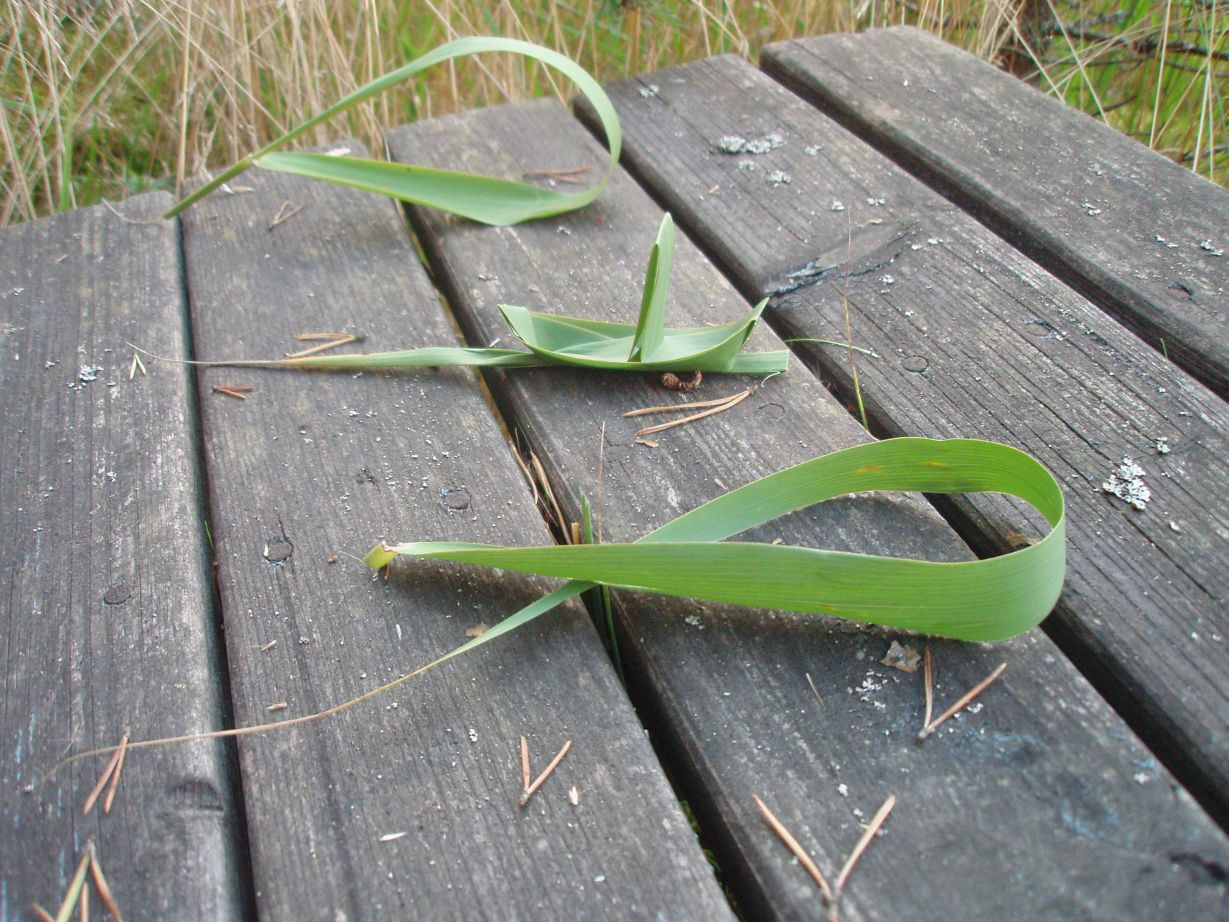
Swedish reed boats

A leaf boat is a traditional toy made in various parts of the world using nothing but a leaf. Various types of leaves are used depending on the area, most commonly flag iris, reed leaves and bamboo leaves.

== Names in other languages ==
- Finnish: kaislavene 'reed boat'
- German: Schilfblattboot 'reed leaf boat'
- Japanese: 竹葉舟 'bamboo leaf boat' or 笹の葉舟 'sasa leaf boat'
- Chinese: simplified Chinese: 竹叶舟; traditional Chinese: 竹葉舟; pinyin: zhúyèzhōu; Cantonese Yale: jūk yihp jāu 'bamboo leaf boat'
- Scottish Gaelic: bàta-siolastair 'iris boat'
- Spanish: barco de hoja de caña 'reed leaf boat'
- Swedish: vassbåt 'reed boat'

== Process ==
In most cases, the process of the more complex boats involves:

1. folding over the ends of the leaf
2. tearing the leaf on both sides alongside of the midrib
3. tucking the torn sections into each other to form the prow and stem
4. folding a sail and tucking the far end into the stem.

Clip showing how to make a Scottish style leaf boat from an iris leaf (no sound)

== See also ==
- Caballito de totora
- Reed boat
- Loi Krathong
