= Boita Bandana =

Festival of Odisha

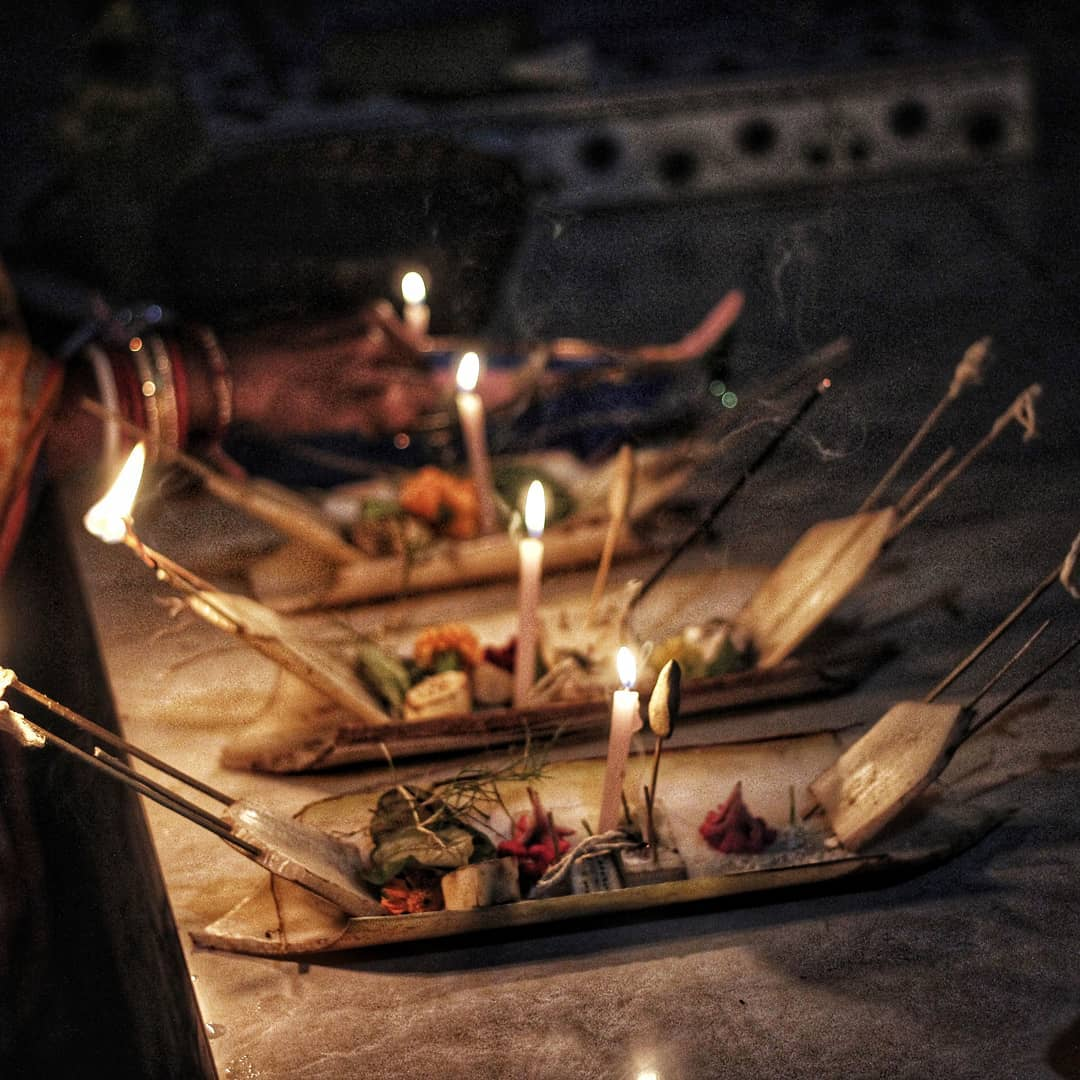
- Miniature boita (boats) used for Boita Bandana on Kartika Purnima
- Official name: Boita Bandana
- Also called: Danga Bhasa
- Observed by: Odias
- Type: Asian
- Significance: To commemorate the day when Sadhabas (ancient Odia mariner merchants) would set sail to distant lands of Southeast Asia and Sri Lanka for trade
- Observances: Pujas, rituals, float miniature boats as a symbolic gesture of their ancestors' voyage
- Date: Kartika Purnima- Full moon day in the month of Kartika in Odia calendar
- 2025 date: 5 November
- Frequency: Annual
- Related to: Loi Krathong (in Thailand), Bon Om Touk (in Cambodia)

Boita Bandāna (Odia: ବୋଇତ ବନ୍ଦାଣ boita bandāṇa) also known as Dangā Bhasā (Odia: ଡଙ୍ଗା ଭସା ḍaṅgā bhasā), is a traditional Odia maritime and naval festival celebrated annually throughout Odisha, India. The name could be translated as "to float ritual boats and worshipping with lighted lamp" and comes from the tradition of making decorated boats, which are then floated on a river as a symbolic gesture of their ancestors' voyage.

Boita Bandana takes place in the early morning of Kartika Purnima which is the full moon day in the month Kartika in the traditional Odia calendar. Since it falls on the lunar phase of the solar calendar, the exact date of the festival changes every year. In the Gregorian calendar, the festival usually falls in the month of November. The festival is celebrated to mark the commemoration on the day when Sadhabas (ancient Odia mariner merchants) would set sail to distant lands of mainland and insular Southeast Asia and Sri Lanka for trade and cultural exchange.

A major commemoration of this festival called Bali Jatra is held at Gadagadia Ghata of Cuttack on the banks of Mahanadi river.

== Etymology ==
The name of the festival is a genesis of two words: Boita and Bandana. Where Boita (Odia: ବୋଇତ Boita) refers to larger boats and ships that were built in the ancient Kalinga kingdom during their historic era of maritime trade, while Bandana (Odia: ବନ୍ଦାଣ bandāṇa) derived from Vandana (Sanskrit: वन्दन) refers to the worship with lighted lamp, hence referring to the homage paid to the ancient merchants who made the voyage.

Its other name Danga Bhasa is similarly the genesis of two words: Danga (boat) and bhasa (float), which literally means 'the floating of boats'.

== History ==
The origins of this festival descends from an ancient maritime tradition of merchant trade and voyages across the ocean to different regions of Asia, which was well developed in this region known in ancient times as Kalinga. This ancient maritime tradition is preserved through this festival which celebrates the voyages of their ancestors, to Southeast Asian countries, which includes mainly present-day Bali, Java, Sumatra and Borneo in Indonesia, Malaysia, Sri Lanka, Thailand, Cambodia and all the way to Champa region in Vietnam. Local traditions ascribe the origins of the ritual tradition to around 3rd century BC as Kalinga was a well known powerful maritime power and with strong trading links across the oceans especially during the reign of Maurya Empire whose rulers coveted the region for its influence.

The voyages were undertaken in vessels known as boitas, by sadhabas or merchant mariners. They set off for months at a time, to trade with people from these distant lands across the ocean in Southeast Asia. Kartika Purnima was considered auspicious for them to begin their voyage. It was during this time of month as well when the Northeast monsoon winds start blowing from November, which was favourable for the merchant mariners as the winds would guide the sails of their boats across the ocean leading them southwards towards Sri Lanka. Thereafter using the ocean currents to cross the Indian Ocean to reach Southeast Asia where they would carry on sailing across different regions for trade. After trading the ships would take the ocean countercurrent to get back to Sri Lanka in time to take advantage of the Southwest monsoon around the month of May and return home.

Hence the women from the families of the traveling sailors used to perform rituals on the day of Kartik Purnima for their safe journey and return, which henceforth became the tradition of Boita Bandana (Worship of the Boats).

== Festival ==
The festival is celebrated on Kartika Purnima which is the full moon day in the month of Kartika in the Odia calendar. Kartika month is considered to be the most auspicious and sacred in the traditional calendar. In the early hours of the day, people assemble on the banks of rivers, ponds, tanks and sea shore and float miniature boats made of paper, banana bark, cork etc, decorated with betel nut, betel leaves, flowers and with lit diyas (lamps). The boats are worshipped as per the rituals which is reminiscent of the sea voyage, which was undertaken on that particular day by the merchants of Kalinga known as Sadhabas. The ritualistic floating of boats signifies the symbolic gesture of their ancestors' voyage across the sea. The floating ritual of the boat is accompanied by the phrase:

Aa Kaa Maa Bai
Phrase	Transliteration
ଆ କା ମା ବୈ, ପାନ ଗୁଆ ଥୋଇ, ପାନ ଗୁଆ ତୋର, ମାସକ ଧରମ ମୋର ।	ā kā mā bai, pāna guā thoi, pāna guā tora, māsaka dharama mora.

The common interpretation of the phrase is with regards to the offerings of betel nut and betel leaves to the sea brings all the blessings of the month-long worship during the Kartika month and ensures the safe return of family members from long sea voyages. The phrase ଆ କା ମା ବୈ (ā kā mā bai) refers to the four sacred months of Asadha, Kartika, Magha and Baisakha which represents the duration of voyage for ships to Southeast Asian island countries in ancient times.

== Maritime folklore ==
The maritime links to Kartik Purnima are also preserved through the means of folklore like songs and plays. One such old folk tale is about Ta'apoi (Odia: ତଅପୋଇ) which dates to around 13th-14th century CE. The story describes a wealthy sadhaba family which consists of a wealthy widower merchant who had seven sons and a daughter named Ta'apoi. The daughter being the youngest in the family was doted on by her father and brothers. The merchant decided to take his sons on a trading voyage leaving Ta'apoi behind in the care of his seven daughters-in-law. Unfortunately it didn't go well as they secretly resented her and made Ta'poi do all the household work and even made her starve may times. Months after enduring physical and mental abuse Ta'apoi ran away to the forest and prayed to Goddess Mangala (a form of Goddess Durga) who showered her blessings and a few days later, her father and brothers return unexpectedly. Realising what had happened, they brought Ta'apoi back and punished the sisters-in-law for their misdeeds. This folk tale hence points out the tradition of long voyages and also expresses the inner anxieties of the merchants and their family members.

=== Khudurukuni Osha ===
The Ta'apoi folktale has hence formed the base for one of the popular religious festivals of the Odia community practiced by unmarried girls who keep a fast (ବ୍ରତ brata) in the month of Bhadraba for the well-being of their brothers and future husbands. The folktale's incorporation as the Khudurukuni Osha festival (Odia: ଖୁଦୁରୁକୁଣୀ ଓଷା khudurukuṇī oṣā) is an important indicator of the preservation of maritime folk traditions of the region.

== Gallery ==
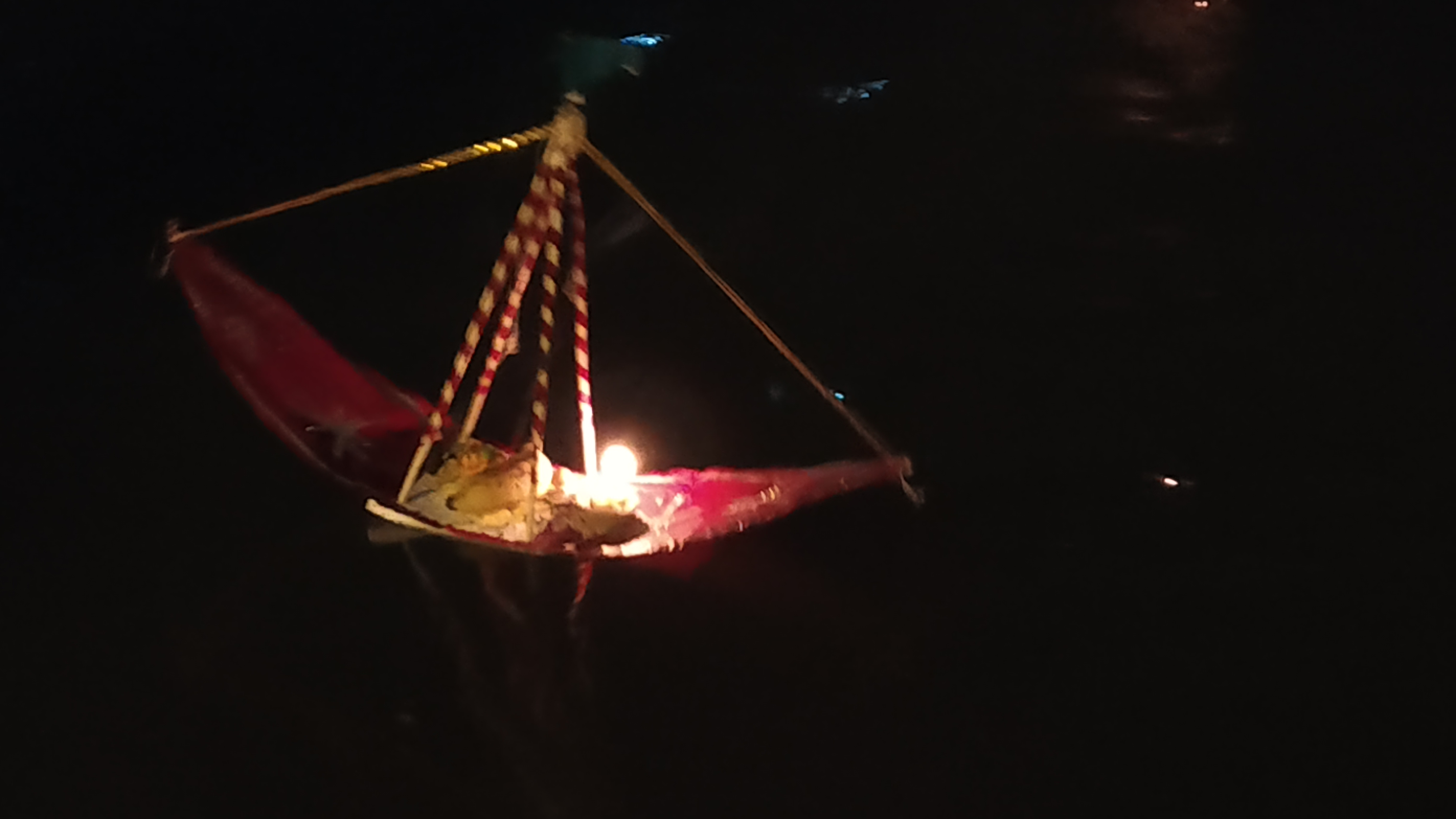
Floating boat on Boita Bandana

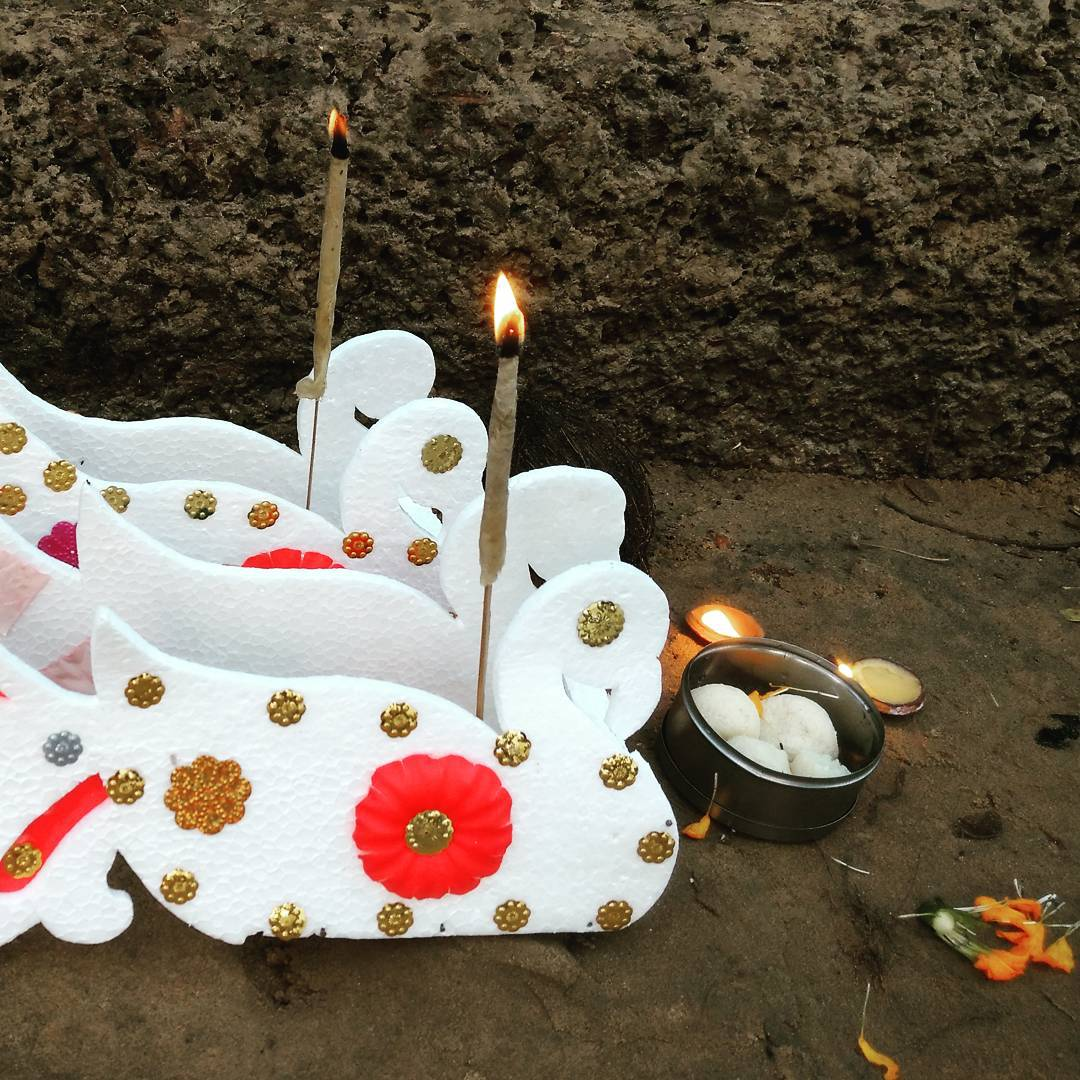
Miniature boats used during rituals

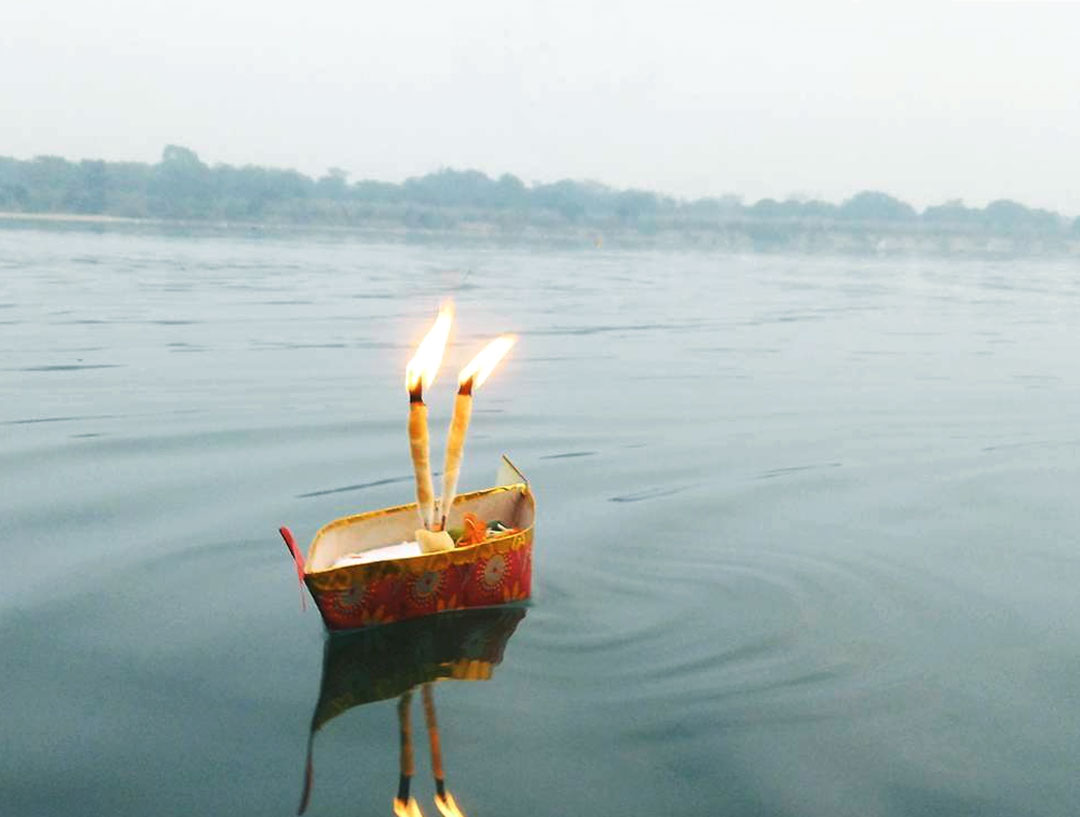
Boat floating on the river during the festival

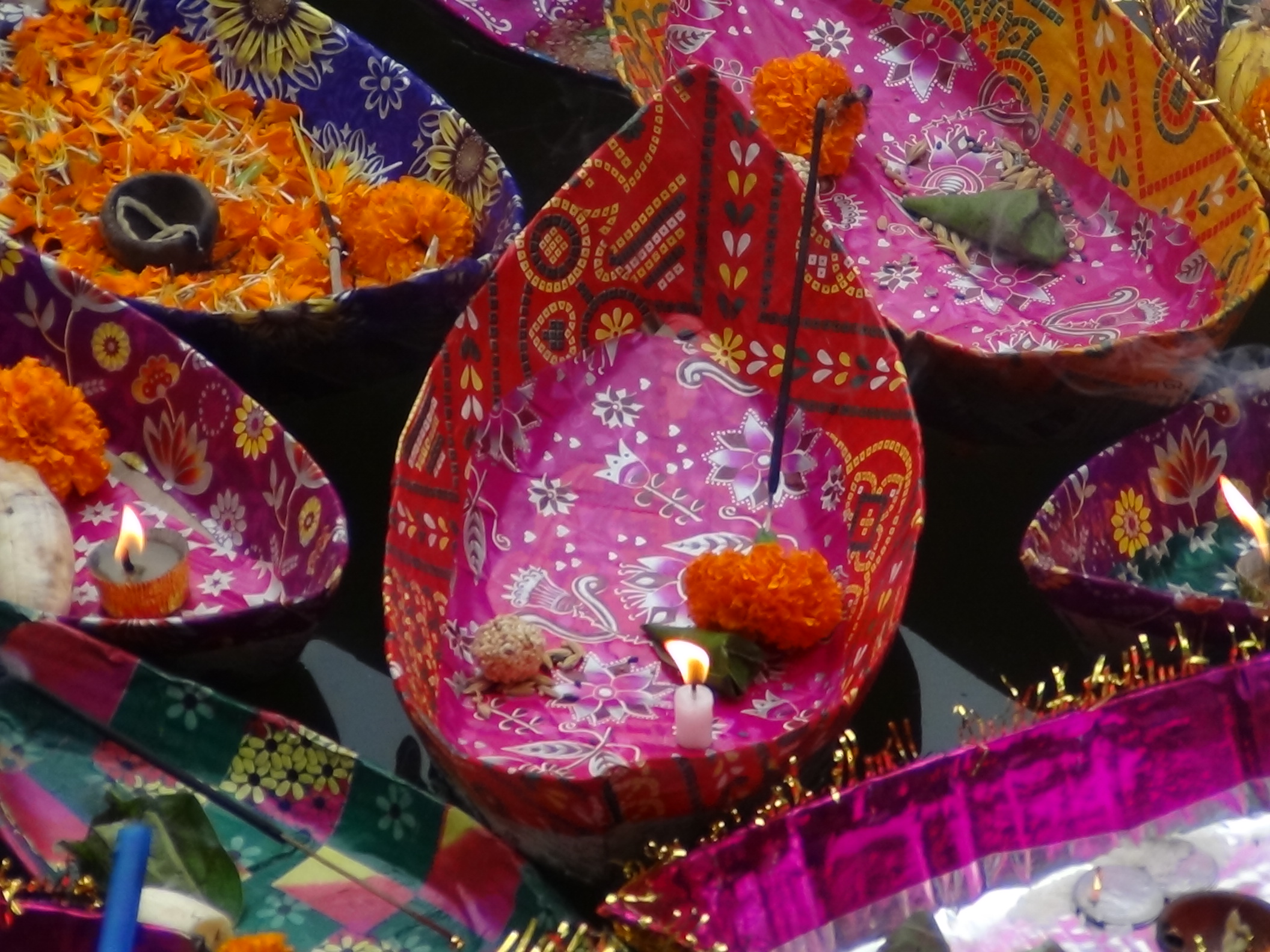
Boita bandana at Bhubaneswar

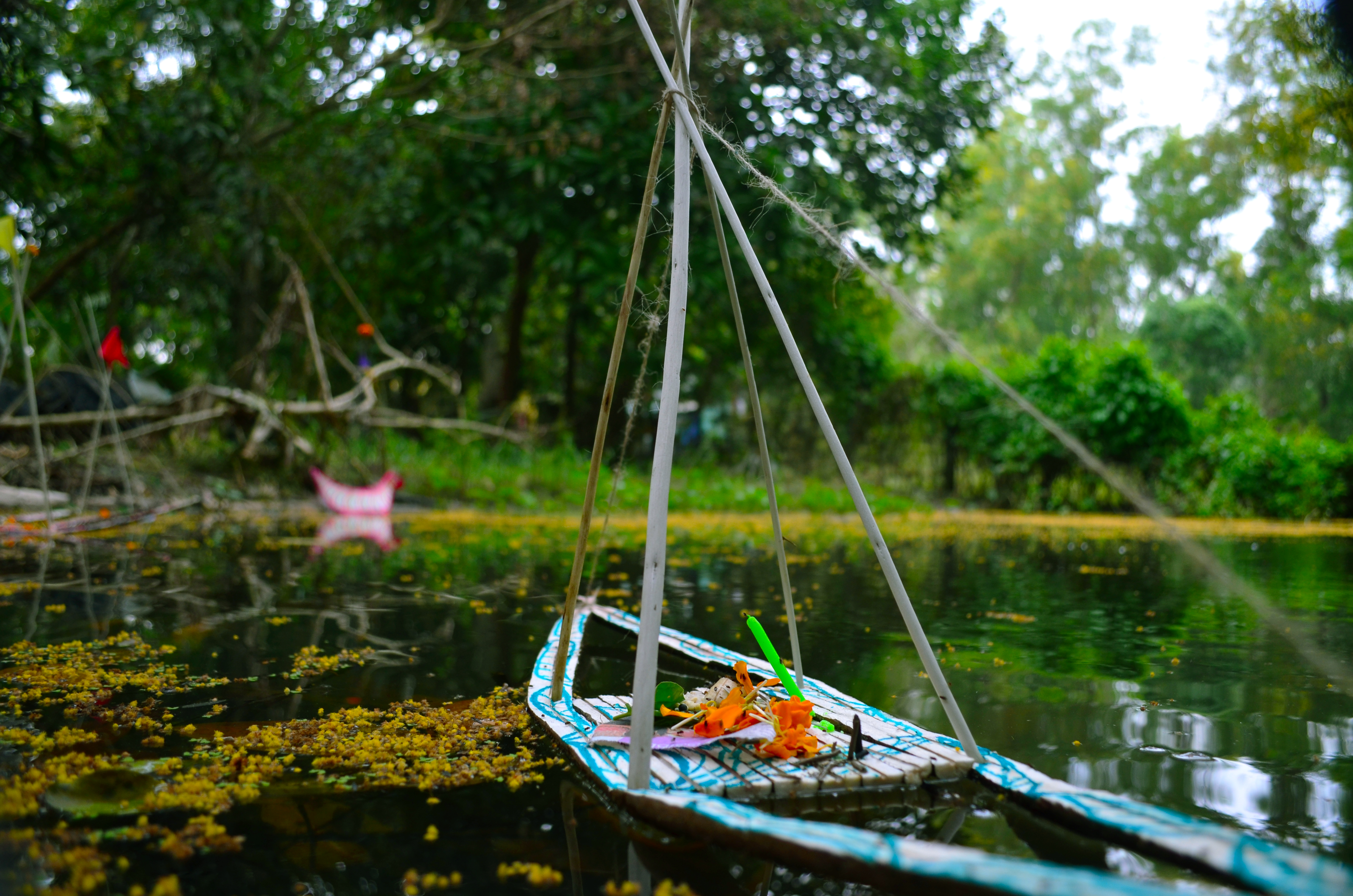
Boita bandana at Baleswar

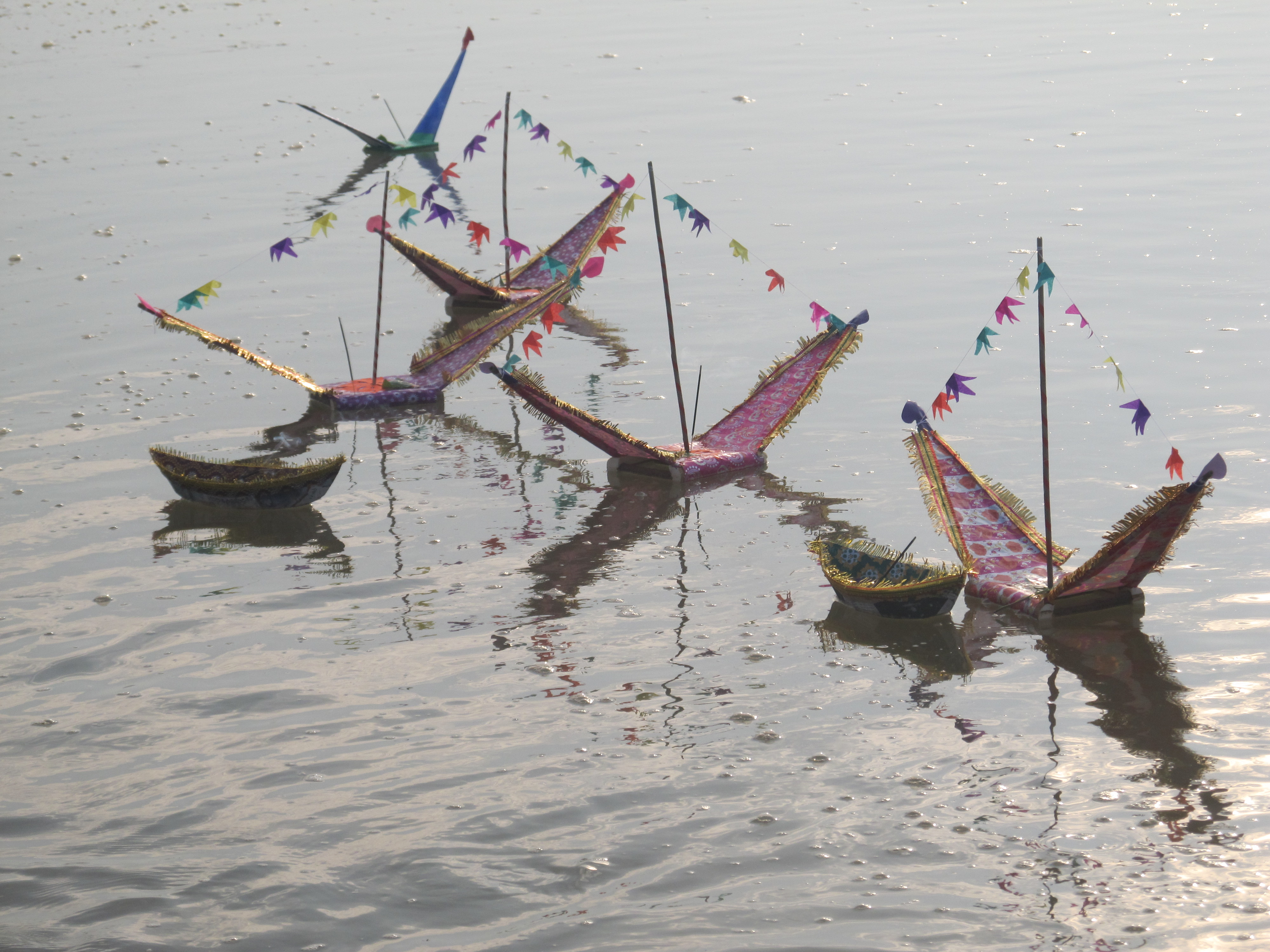
Boita bandana at Dhenkanal
