= Loy Krathong =

Thai festival

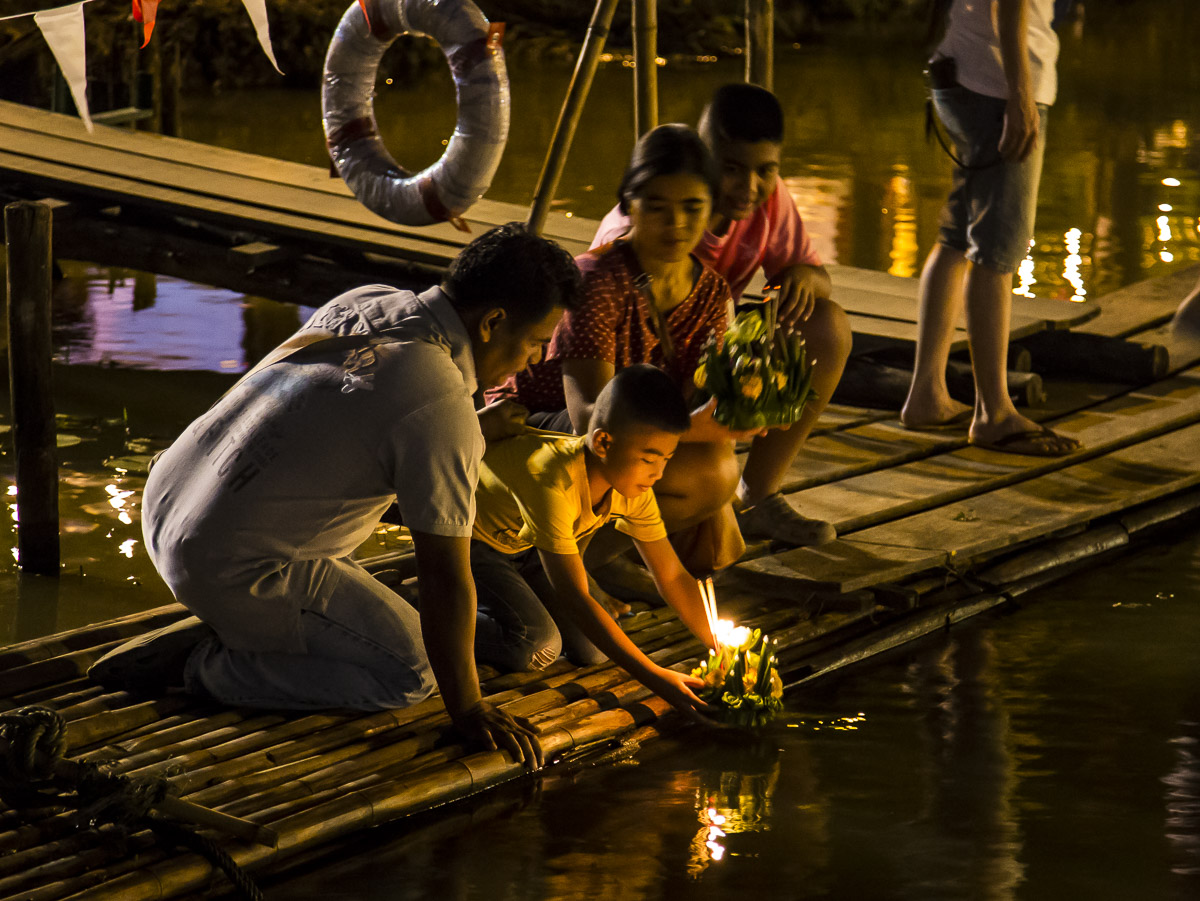
- Floating krathong in Chiang Mai
- Official name: Loy Krathong
- Observed by: Thailand, Laos (as Boun That Luang), northern Malaysia, Shan in Myanmar, and Xishuangbanna in China, Myanmar (as Tazaungdaing festival), Sri Lanka (as Il Poya), Cambodia (as Bon Om Touk), China (as Lantern Festival),
- Type: Asian
- Significance: Worship and ask for forgiveness from Goddess of water Ganga, worship the Buddha's hair pagoda in the heaven
- Date: Full moon of the 12th Thai month
- Frequency: Annual
- Related to: Tazaungdaing festival (in Myanmar), Mid-Autumn Festival (in China), Bon Om Touk (in Cambodia), Il Poya (in Sri Lanka), Boita Bandana (in Odisha, India)

Loy Krathong (Thai: ลอยกระทง, RTGS: Loi Krathong, pronounced [lɔ̄ːj krā.tʰōŋ]) (Note: Alternative spellings include Loi Kratong, Loy Gratong, etc.) is a Thai festival celebrated annually throughout Thailand and in nearby countries with significant Southwestern Tai cultures (Laos, Shan, Mon, Tanintharyi, Kelantan, Kedah, Perlis and Xishuangbanna). The name could be translated as "to float ritual vessel or lamp," and comes from the tradition of making krathong or buoyant, decorated baskets, which are then floated on a river. Originally limited to Bangkok elites, Loy Krathong became an “invented tradition” in post-WWII Thailand in response to nationalism and to drive tourism. Many Thais use the krathong to thank the Goddess of Water and River, Goddess Khongkha (Thai: พระแม่คงคา) This festival along with other Hindu/brahmanical beliefs and practices trace back to India and were first practiced during the 11th/12th century Angkorian period of the Khmer Empire, pre-dating Sukhothai.

Loy Krathong takes place on the evening of the full moon of the 12th month in the traditional Thai lunar calendar, thus the exact date of the festival changes every year. In the Western calendar this usually falls in the month of November. In Chiang Mai, the festival lasts three days, and in 2024, the dates were 15-17 November.

In Thailand, the festival is known as Loi Krathong. Outside Thailand, this festival is celebrated under different names, including Myanmar as the "Tazaungdaing festival", Sri Lanka as "Il Full Moon Poya", China as "Lantern Festival" and Cambodia as "Bon Om Touk".

== Overview ==
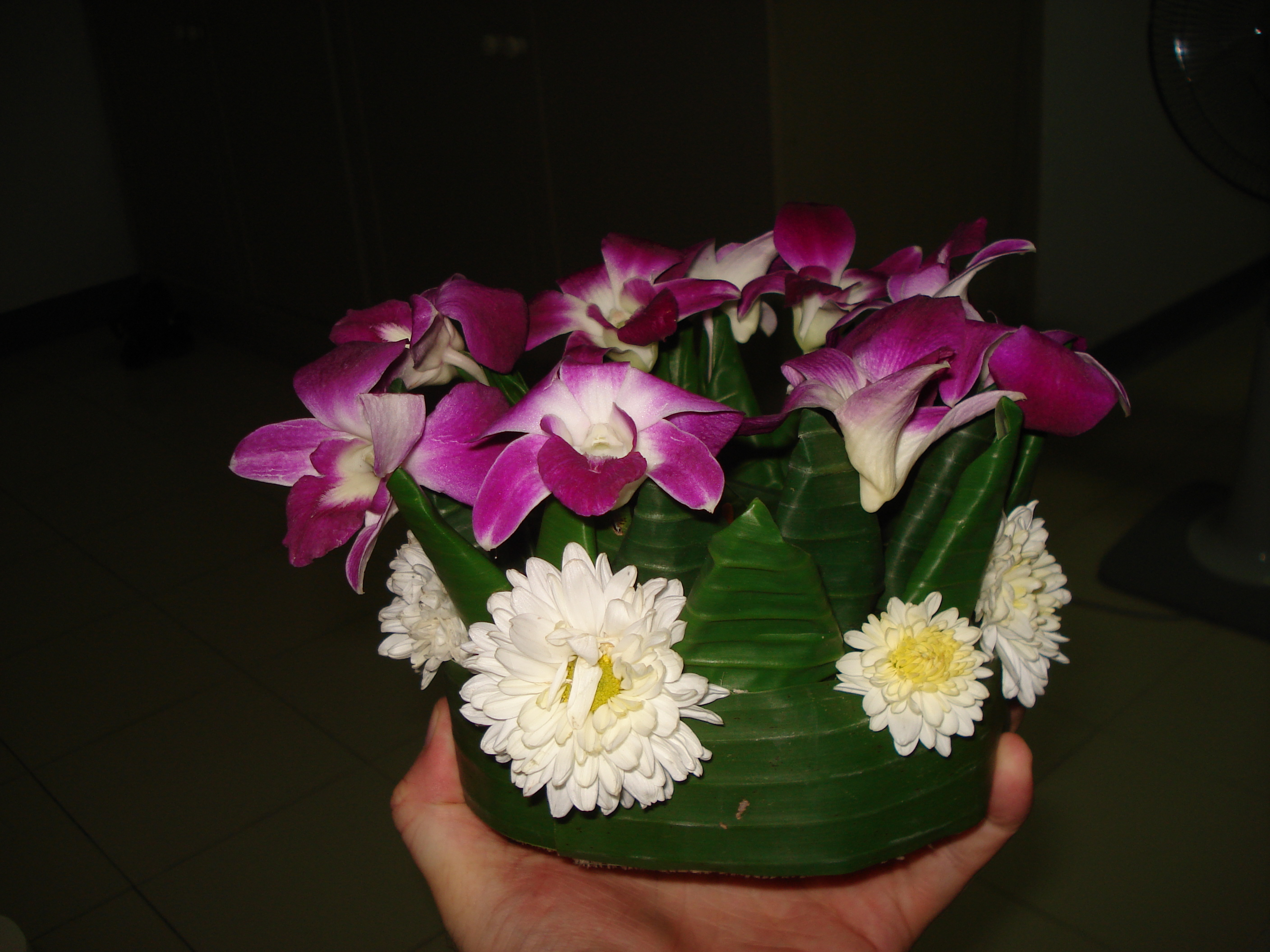
A hand-made krathong, made from banana tree trunk and banana leaves, held together with pins, and decorated with flowers

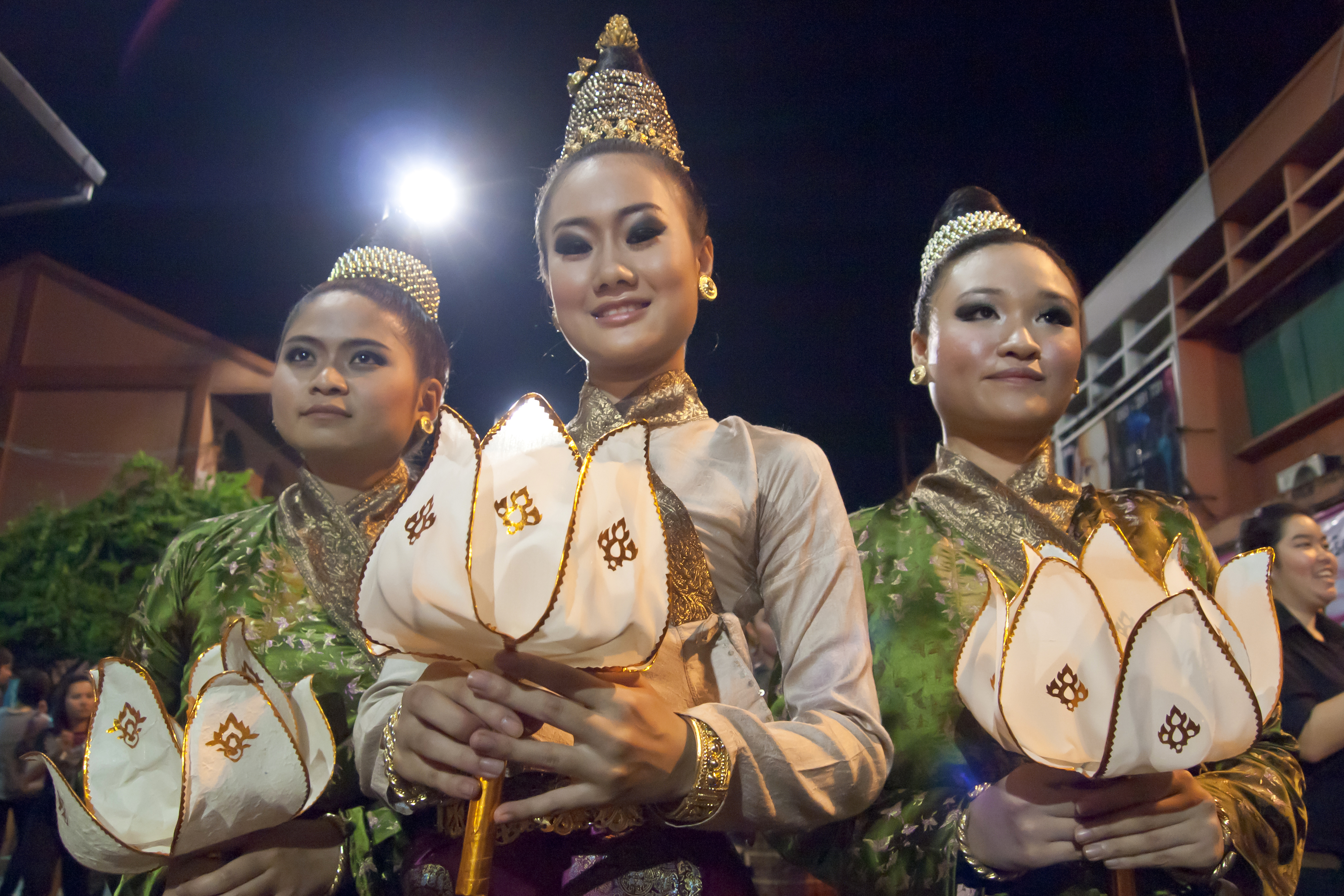
Krathong symbolism at Loi Krathong Festival Procession in Chiang Mai

A krathong is traditionally a small floating container fashioned of leaves which is made to hold a small portion of goods like a traditional Thai dish (such as hor mok) or dessert. The traditional krathong used for floating at the festival are made from a slice of a banana tree trunk or a spider lily plant. Modern krathongs are more often made of bread or Styrofoam. A bread krathong will disintegrate after a few days and can be eaten by fish. Banana stalk krathongs are also biodegradable, but Styrofoam krathongs are increasingly banned, as they pollute rivers and oceans. A krathong is decorated with elaborately folded banana leaves, three incense sticks, and a candle. A small coin is sometimes included as an offering to the river spirits. On the night of the full moon, Thais launch their krathong on a river, canal, or a pond, making a wish as they do so. The floats are thought to have been introduced to Chiang Mai in 1947 and have since been incorporated into Thai culture. Government offices, corporations, and other organizations launch large decorated krathongs. There are competitions for the best of these large krathongs. Beauty contests often accompany the festivities and fireworks also have become common.

The practice of Loy Krathong in Thailand has roots in Hinduism, derived from the Hindu festival of Diwali, the festival of lights celebrated in India. Hindus were known to celebrate the Diwali festival to worship the divine trinity and those Hindus who were converted to Buddhism had created a rite similar to the Diwali. Hinduism has existed in the area of present-day Thailand since the Indianized "pre-Thai era" of the Mon Dvaravati Kingdom and the Khmer Empire. Thai historian Pasuk Phongpaichit and author Chris Baker write that the Nang Nopphamat manuscript was likely authored during the reign of King Rama III to provide a "pure Thai" pedigree for court rituals that were known to be of Khmer-Brahminical origin, effectively "naturalizing" the foreign heritage into a national identity.

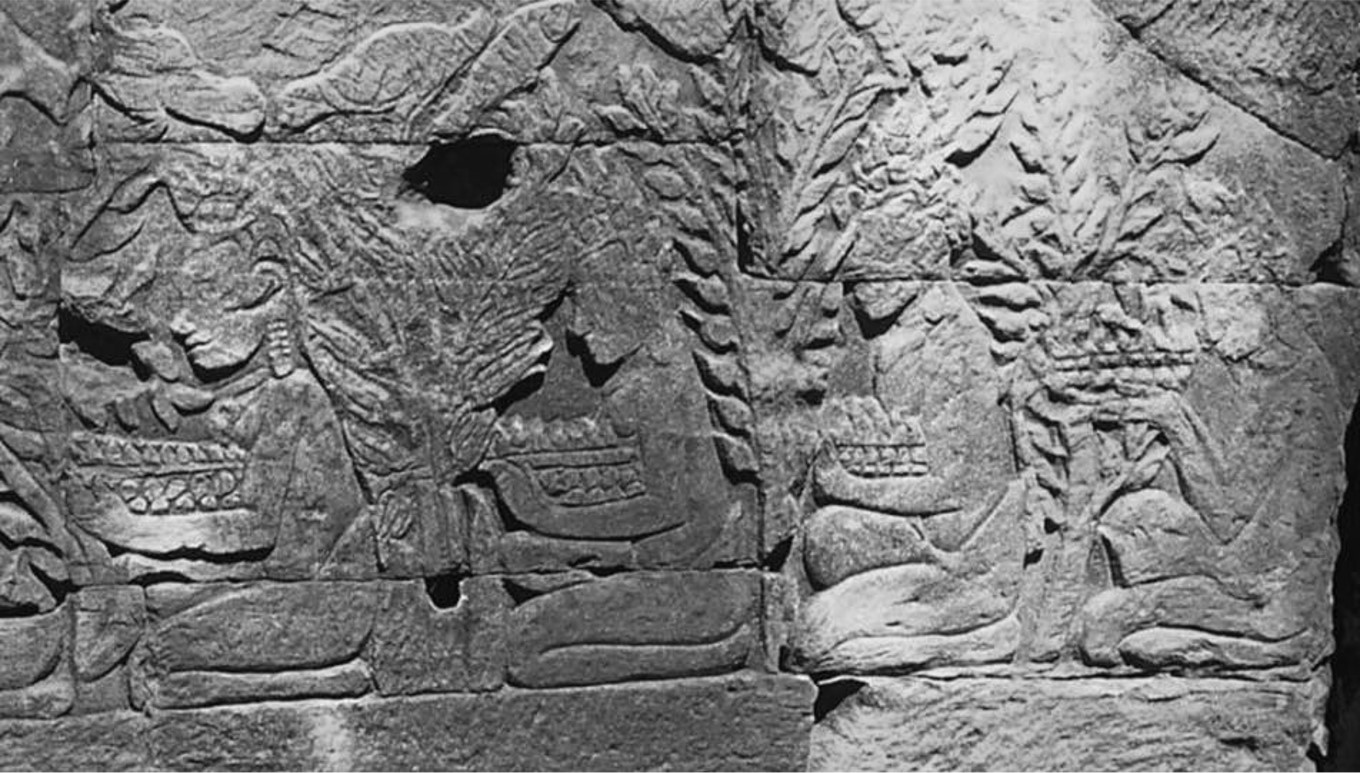
A 12th century Khmer Empire bas-relief at Bayon, Cambodia depicting Kantong

The earliest record of Loy Krathong is a bas-relief depiction on the Bayon, a late-12th, early-13th-century temple in Cambodia built by King Jayavarman VII during the Khmer Empire. A bas-relief on the upper level depicts a queen residing on the boat to float the krathong in the river whereas six other royal concubines are depicted below, some of which are holding the krathong and dedicating at the riverbank in a similar tradition practiced in present-day Cambodia. Nothing exists to suggest Loy Krathong was a tradition in the "water-scarce" city of Sukhothai. Knowledge of Loy Krathong was limited to Bangkok elites prior to World War II. Driven by nationalism, a post-coup pop song, and then an economic initiative to attract tourists in the 1960s, Loy Krathong became an "invented tradition" in Thailand. Similarities can be observed with Kartik Purnima celebrated in the eastern state of Odisha in India. This festival is called Boita Bandana\ Dangā Bhasā, which is observed on the Kartik Purnima or full moon day of Kartik month (which corresponds to October–November) in Odia calendar. Loy Krathong festivities are usually celebrated during the period which corresponds to Kartik Purnima. Odisha being part of the ancient Kalinga which had strong maritime trade relations with Southeast Asia, the similarities in all these festivals may not be coincidental.

== Etymology ==
According to the 1999 Royal Institute Dictionary, loi (ลอย) means 'to float', while krathong (กระทง) has various meanings, one of which is 'a small vessel made of leaves which can be floated on water during the Loy Krathong festival.' Others believe krathong to be a derivate of the Malay word kantong (Kantong). Other sources say it comes from Khmer.

Khmer - Malay\Java\Cham loanword កន្ទោង kɑntouŋ: noun; small container made of banana leaves (used esp. for steaming cakes or as a container for religious offerings such as food, tobacco, or betel).

== History ==
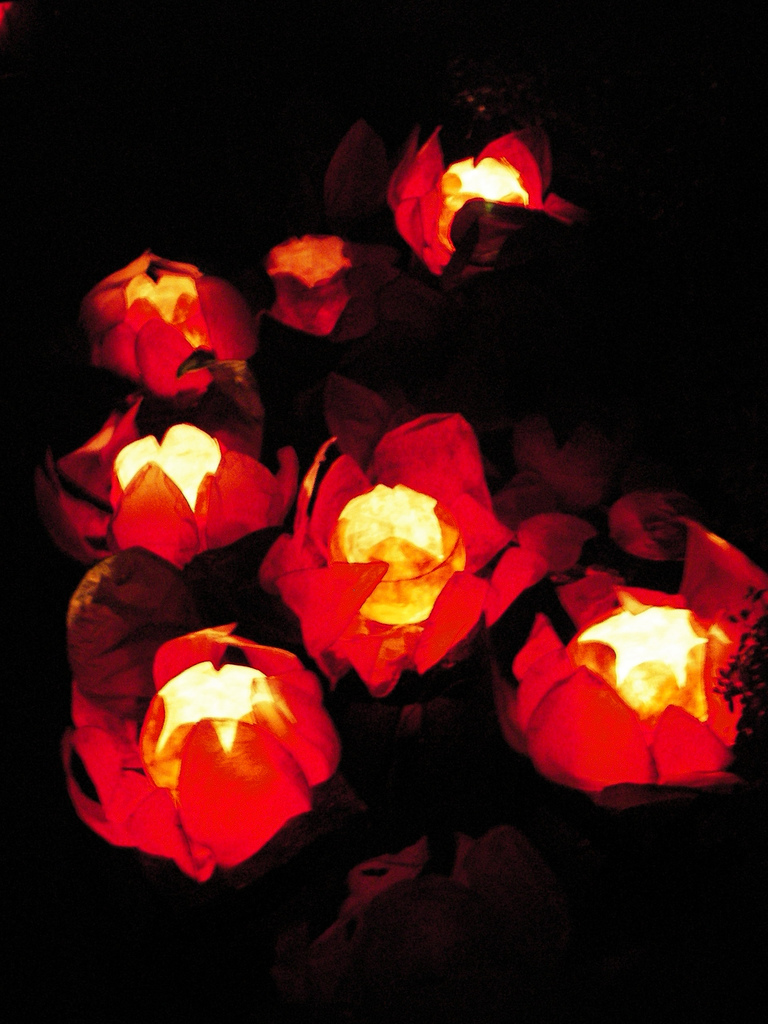
Chinese Water Lantern, one of the possible origins of Thai Krathong

=== Legend in Sukhothai Kingdom Period ===
Loy Krathong is once said to have begun in the Sukhothai Kingdom by a court lady named Nopphamat. However, it is now known that the Nopphamat tale comes from a poem written in the early-Bangkok period. The Cambodian practice of moon-worship and floating lanterns demonstrates a long-practiced tradition before Thai adoption and is depicted on a Bayon bas-relief. According to King Rama IV, writing in 1863, it was a Hindu festival that was adapted by Thai Buddhists in Thailand to honour the Buddha, Prince Siddhartha Gautama. The candle venerates the Buddha with light, while the krathong's floating away symbolises letting go of all one's hatred, anger, and defilements. People sometimes cut their fingernails or hair and place the clippings on the krathong as a symbol of letting go of past transgressions and negative thoughts. Many Thais use the krathong to thank the Goddess of Water, the Hindu Goddess Ganga, Phra Mae Khongkha (Thai: พระแม่คงคา).

On Loy Krathong's origins, Thai historian Pasuk Phongpaichit and author Chris Baker write in A History of Ayutthaya: Siam in the Early Modern World that:

"The story of Nang Nopphamat, the supposed lady of the Sukhothai court who invented the krathong, is a literary fiction of the Bangkok period... designed to provide a 'pure Thai' pedigree for a festival that was actually a complex mix of Khmer Brahminism and local water rites inherited from the Ayutthaya period." (p. 82)

=== Ayutthaya Kingdom and Lavo Kingdom Period ===
Simon de la Loubère led an embassy to Siam (modern Thailand) in 1687 (the "La Loubère-Céberet mission"). Upon his return, La Loubère wrote a description of his travels, as had been requested by Louis XIV, published under the title Du Royaume de Siam. Loy Krathong festival was mentioned in his book in the sixth chapter of part two called Concerning the Shows, and other Diverſion of the Siameſes: Religious Shows: An Illumination on the Waters, and another on the Land, and in the Palace.

"The Siameſes have alſo ſome Religious Shows. When the Waters begin to retreat, the People returns them Thanks for ſeveral Nights together with a great Illumination; not only for that they are retired, but for the Fertility which they render to the Lands. The whole River is then ſeen cover'd with floating Lanthorns which paſs with it. There are of different Sizes, according to the Devotion of every particular Perſon; the variouſly painted Paper, whereof they are made, augments the agreeable effect of ſo many lights. Moreover, to thank the Earth for the Harveſt, they do on the firſt days of their Year make another magnificent Illumination. The firſt time we arriv'd at Louvo was in the Night, and at the time of this Illumination; and we ſaw the Walls of the City adorned with lighted Lanthorns at equal diſtances; but the inſide of the Palace was much more pleaſant to behold. In the Walls which do make the Incloſures of the Courts, there were contrived three rows of ſmall Niches all round, in every of which burnt a Lamp. The Windows and Doors were likewiſe all adorn'd with ſeveral Fires, and ſeveral great and ſmall Lanthorns, of different Figures, garniſhed with Paper, or Canvas, and differently painted, were hung up with an agreeable Symmetry on the Branches of Trees, or on Poſts."― Simon de la Loubère.

=== Rattanakosin Kingdom Period ===
The beauty contests that accompany the festival are known as "Nopphamat Queen Contests" has been promoted since the reign of King Rama III. Since the country became peaceful after getting involved with many wars, King Rama III ordered the palace officers and people to revive and promote the important festivals of the kingdom, such as Loy Krathong. According to legend written on the poem, Nang Nopphamat (Thai: นางนพมาศ; alternatively spelled as "Noppamas" or "Nopamas") was a consort of the 13th century Sukhothai King Sri Indraditya (who is also known as Phra Ruang) and she reputedly was the first to float a decorated raft. However, this tale may have been invented in the early-19th century. There is no evidence that a Nang Nopphamat ever existed. Instead, it is a fact that a woman of this name was the leading character of a novel released at the end of the reign of King Rama III, around 1850 CE. Her character was written as guidance for all women who wished to become civil servants. Kelantan in Malaysia celebrates Loy Krathong similarly, especially in the Tumpat area. The ministry in charge of tourism in Malaysia recognizes it as an attraction for tourists.

=== Lanna Kingdom Period and later Northern Part of Thailand ===
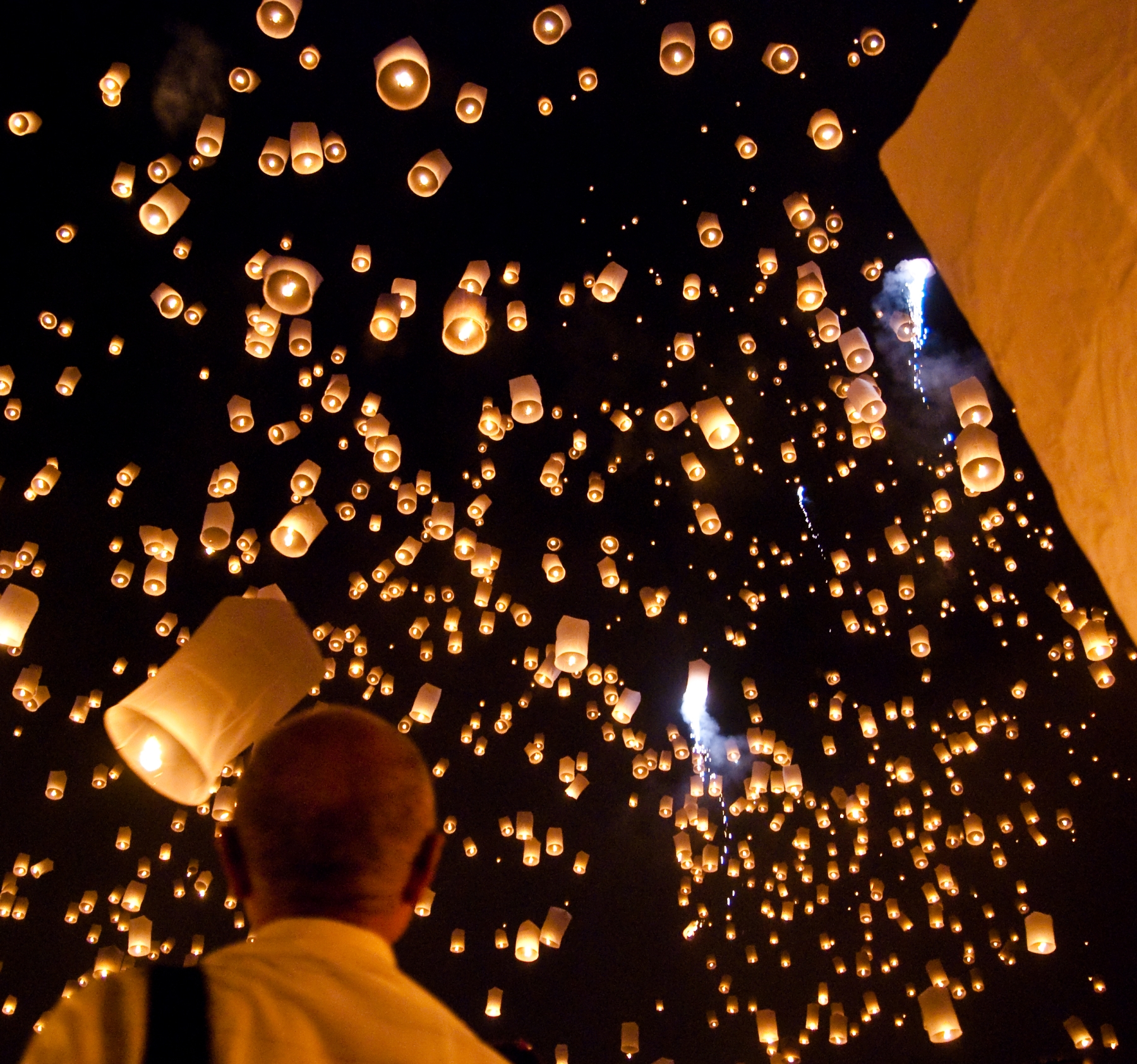
Thousands of khom loi in Mae Jo, Chiang Mai

Loy Krathong coincides with the Lanna (northern Thai) festival known as Yi Peng (Thai: ยี่เป็ง). Yi means 'two' and peng means a 'full moon day'. Yi Peng refers to the full moon day in the second month according to the Lanna lunar calendar (the twelfth month of the Thai lunar calendar). The festival is meant as a time to make merit.

Swarms of sky lanterns (Thai: โคมลอย; RTGS: khom loi), literally: 'floating lanterns', are launched into the air. Khom loi are made from a thin fabric, such as rice paper, stretched over a bamboo or wire frame, to which a candle or fuel cell is attached. When the fuel cell is lit, the resulting hot air is trapped inside the lantern and creates enough lift for the khom loi to float into the sky. During the festival, some people also decorate their houses, gardens, and temples with khom fai (Thai: โคมไฟ), intricately shaped paper lanterns which take on different forms. Khom thue (Thai: โคมถือ) are lanterns which are carried around hanging from a stick, khom khwaen (Thai: โคมแขวน) are the hanging lanterns, and khom pariwat (Thai: โคมปริวรรต), which are placed at temples and which revolve due to the heat of the candle inside. The most elaborate Yi Peng celebrations can be seen in Chiang Mai, the ancient capital of the former Lanna kingdom, where now both Loy Krathong and Yi Peng are celebrated at the same time resulting in lights floating on the waters, lights hanging from trees/buildings or standing on walls, and lights floating in the sky. The tradition of Yi Peng was also adopted by certain parts of Laos during the 16th century.

== Lesser known tradition ==
A lesser-known aspect of Loy Krathong is the tradition where personal items such as finger or toenail clippings are sometimes placed on the krathong before it is floated away. This practice symbolizes letting go of old negativity and inviting new growth and positive energy for the year ahead. This gesture of release adds a personal element to the festival. The floating away of these personal tokens is meant to carry away one's bad luck and misfortunes with the flowing water, creating space for fresh blessings and happiness in the coming year. .

== Aftermath ==
In 2016, the Bangkok Metropolitan Administration (BMA) cleaned six tonnes of rubbish from the city's waterways on the day after Loy Krathong. The city governor said that 661,935 floats were collected from waterways across Bangkok. Of these, 617,901 (93.7 percent) were made of decomposable natural materials, while 44,034 were non-biodegradable Styrofoam floats. There were 163,679 fewer krathong collected than in 2015. The city mobilized 210 workers and 45 boats to collect floats from the Chao Phraya River and canals.

In 2017, because the sky lanterns are a hazard to passing aircraft and "...can cause damage to important places in the areas such as the Grand Palace [sic], temples and governmental offices,..." khom loi are increasingly subject to governmental restrictions. In Chiang Mai, authorities cancelled 78 flights in and out of Chiang Mai Airport on 3–4 November 2017. Another 79 flights were rescheduled. Despite those measures, the remains of more than 100 lanterns were later found on airport premises. In Bangkok, the public are prohibited from using fireworks and sky lanterns entirely. Violators may face three years imprisonment and/or a fine of 60,000 baht. One hundred-ninety piers on the Chao Phraya River will be open to the public to float their krathongs. In 2018, up to 158 flights were cancelled or rescheduled at three airports, and in Bangkok 88 piers were closed.

In 2017, in Nakhon Ratchasima province, 50 workers collected krathong from the moat in the town centre near the Thao Suranaree Monument. In Buriram, more than 200 workers and volunteers in Mueang District cleared at least 20,000 krathong from the town's moat. There, Styrofoam krathong will be banned in 2017. In Lampang, more than 100 students and teachers from the Institute of Physical Education helped municipal workers clean up the Wang River in Mueang District.

In 2018, after the festivities, Bangkok city workers cleared 841,327 krathongs, up from 3.6 percent in 2017, from the Chao Phraya River, local canals, and 30 public parks; 5.3 percent of them were made from styrofoam.

== Scheduled date ==
Zodiac	Date	Date	Date	Date
Rat	24 November 1996	12 November 2008	31 October 2020	17 November 2032
Ox	14 November 1997	2 November 2009	19 November 2021	6 November 2033
Tiger	3 November 1998	21 November 2010	8 November 2022	25 November 2034
Rabbit	22 November 1999	10 November 2011	27 November 2023	15 November 2035
Dragon	11 November 2000	28 November 2012	15 November 2024	3 November 2036
Snake	31 October 2001	17 November 2013	5 November 2025	22 November 2037
Horse	19 November 2002	6 November 2014	24 November 2026	11 November 2038
Goat	8 November 2003	25 November 2015	13 November 2027	31 October 2039
Monkey	26 November 2004	14 November 2016	1 November 2028	18 November 2040
Rooster	16 November 2005	3 November 2017	20 November 2029	8 November 2041
Dog	5 November 2006	22 November 2018	9 November 2030	28 October 2042
Pig	24 November 2007	11 November 2019	28 November 2031	16 November 2043

== Gallery ==
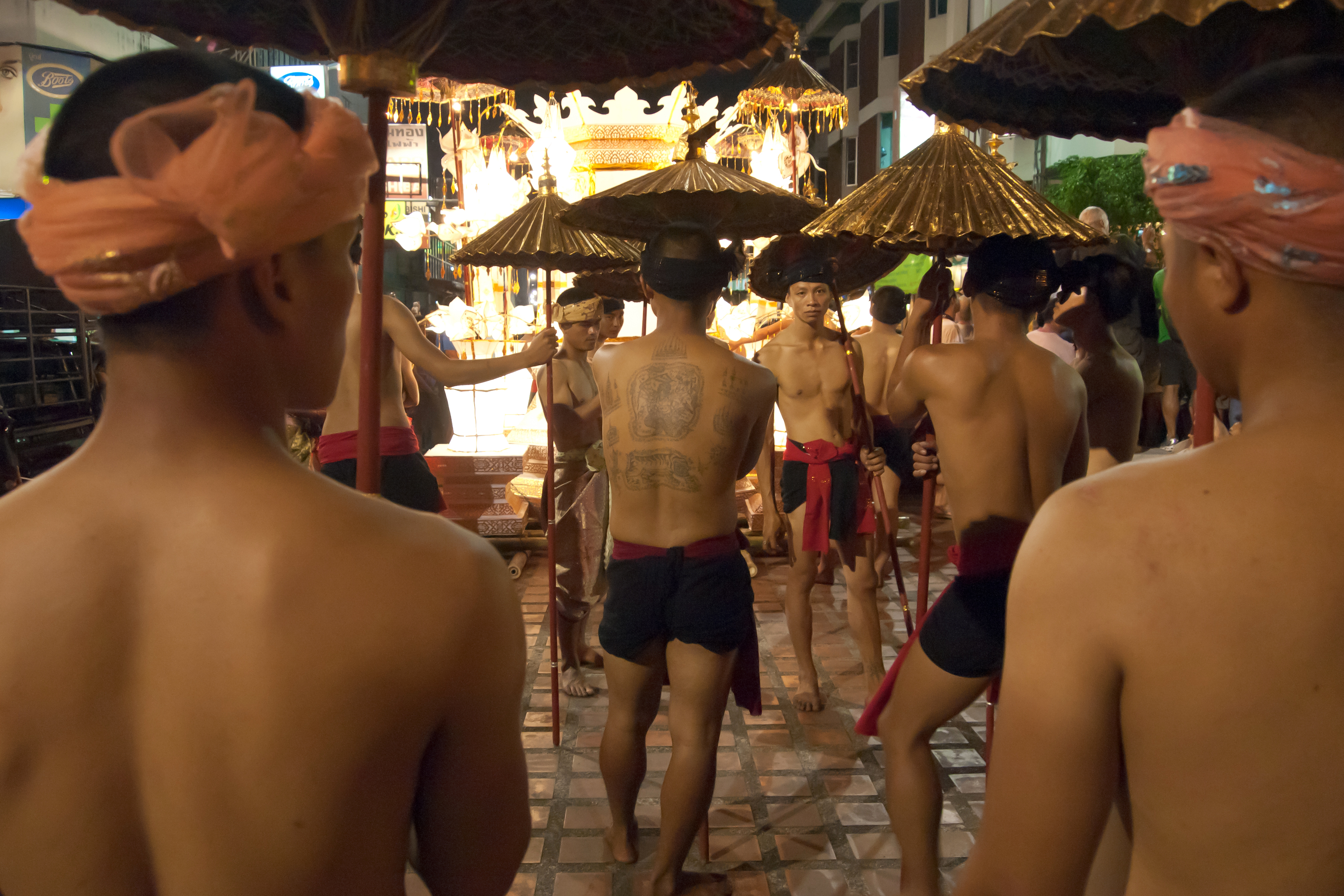
Loy Krathong Festival, Chiang Mai

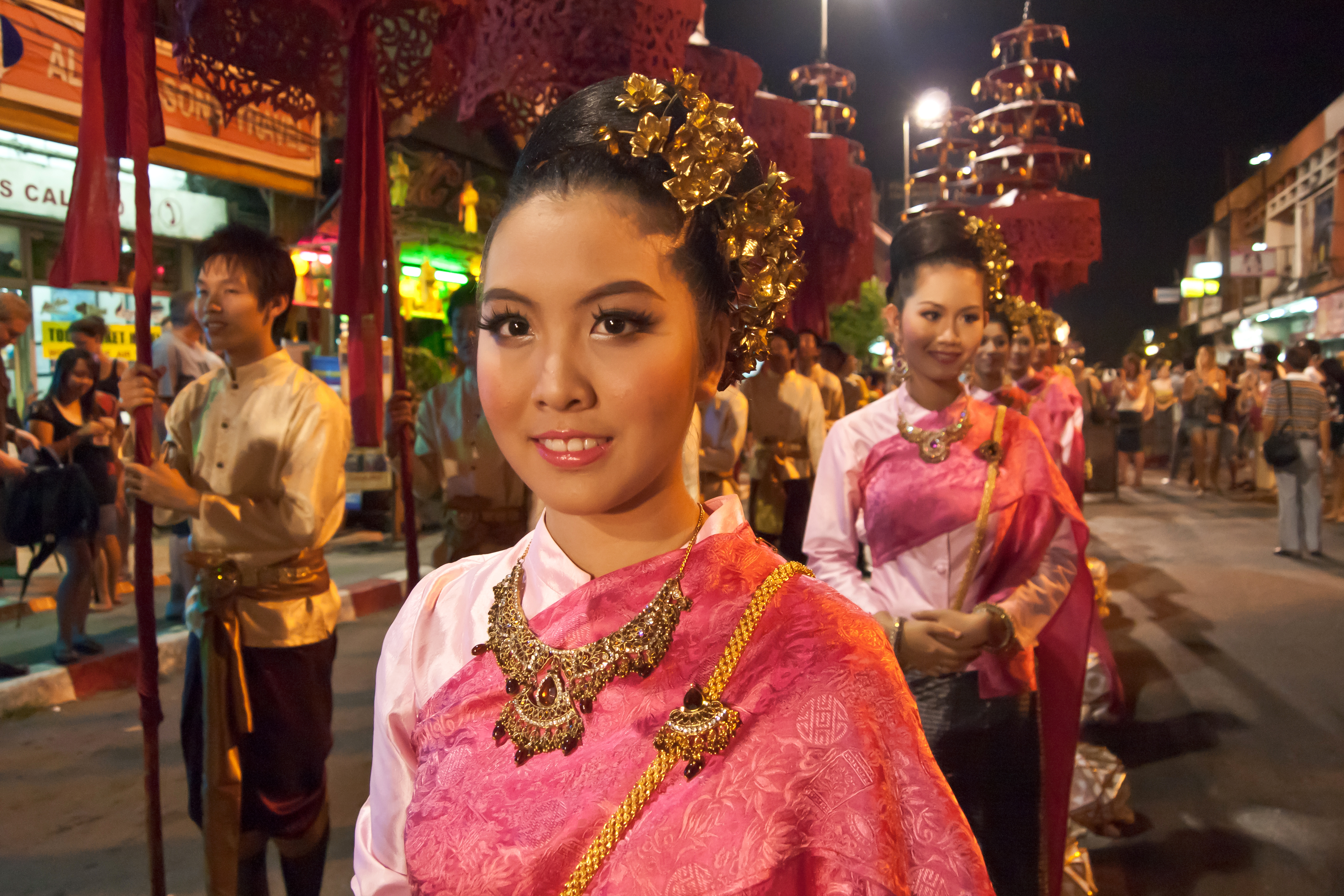
Loy Krathong Festival

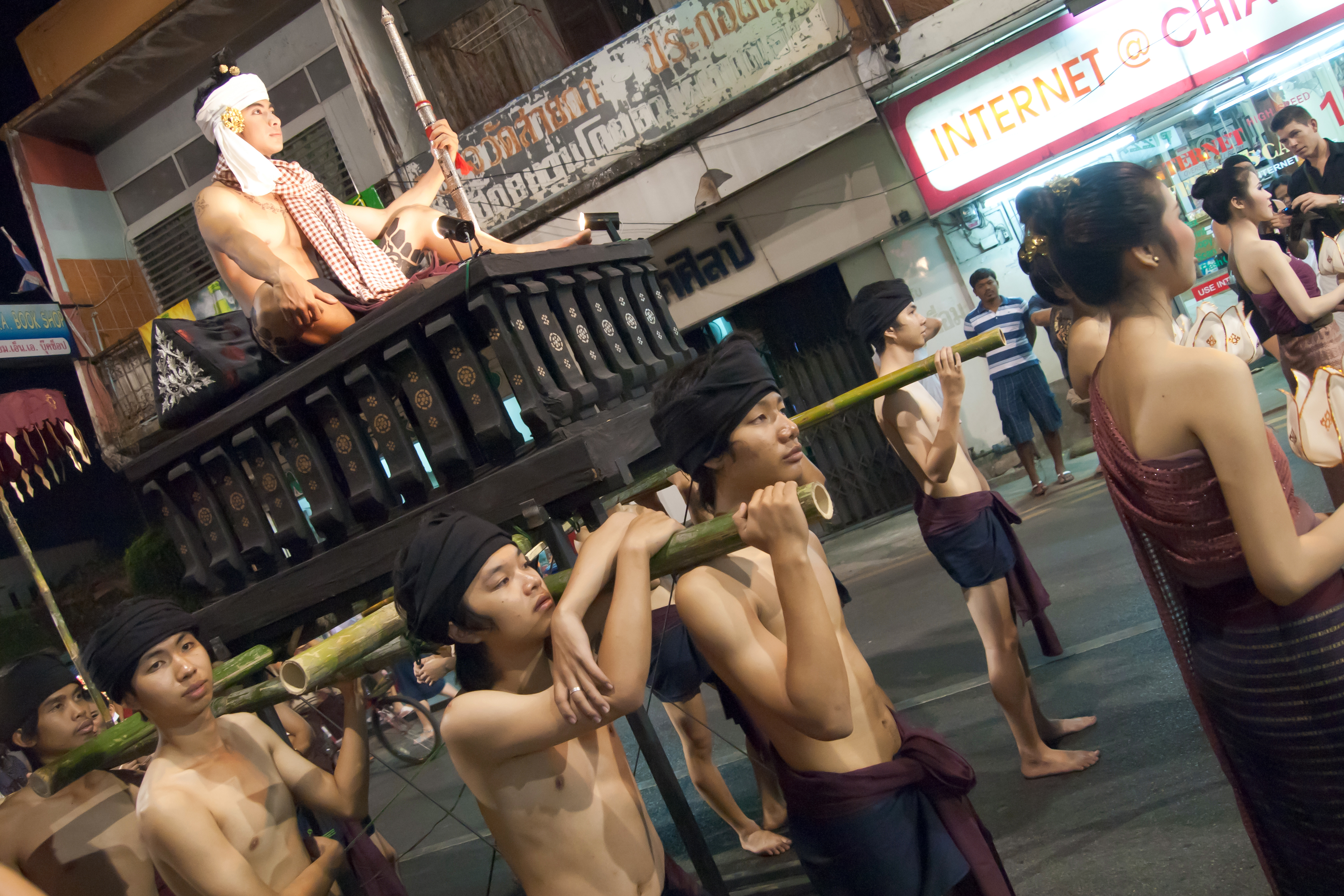

Partially made krathong, showing trunk of banana tree and banana leaves

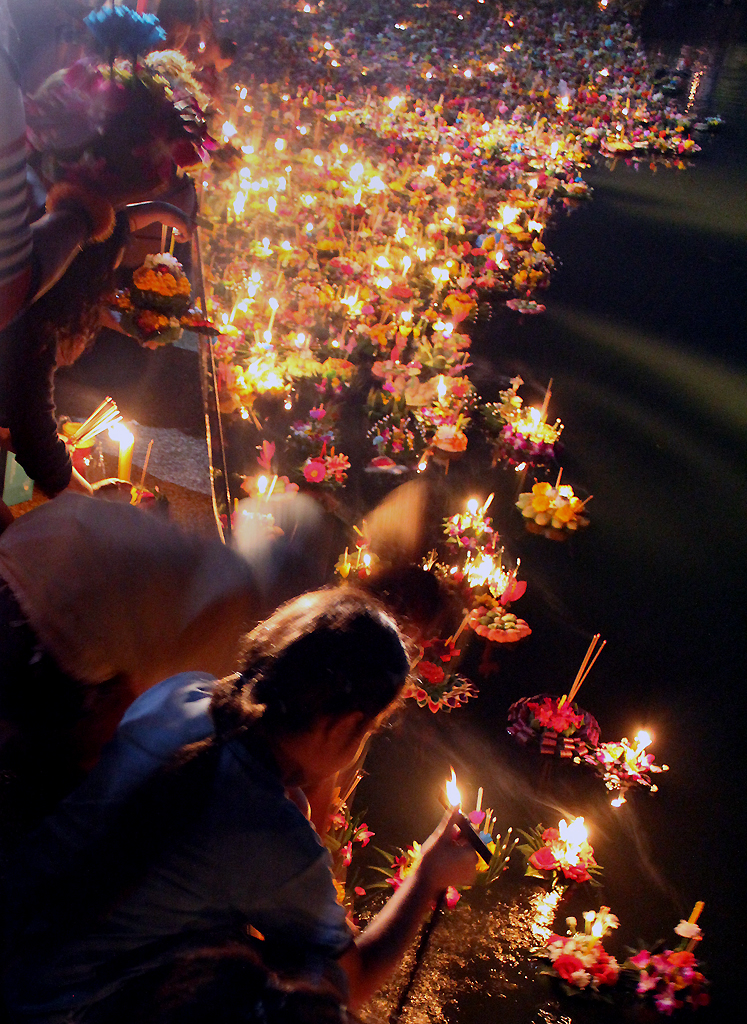
Loy krathongs or floating lanterns at Koh Samui

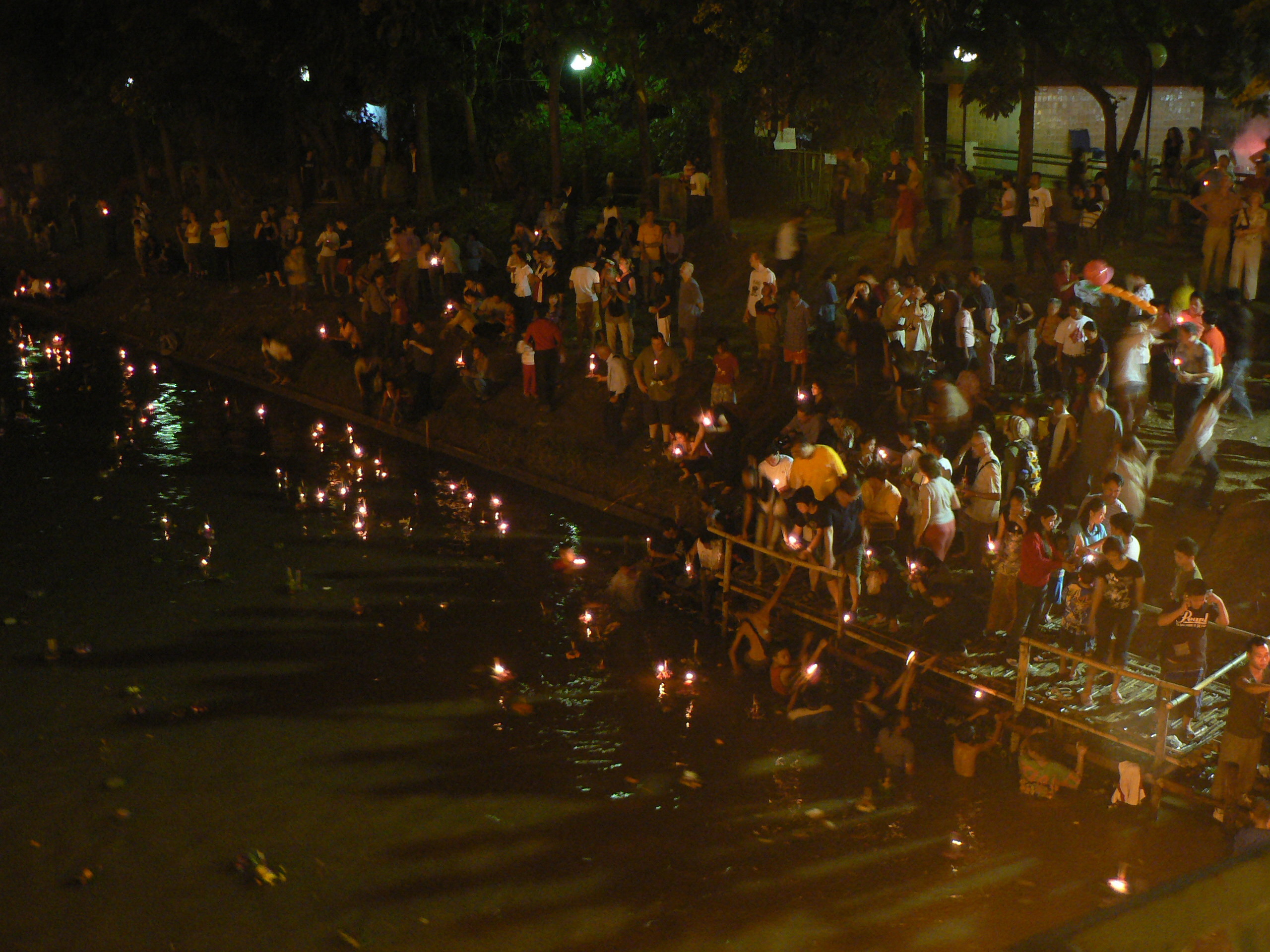
Loy Krathong, Chiang Mai

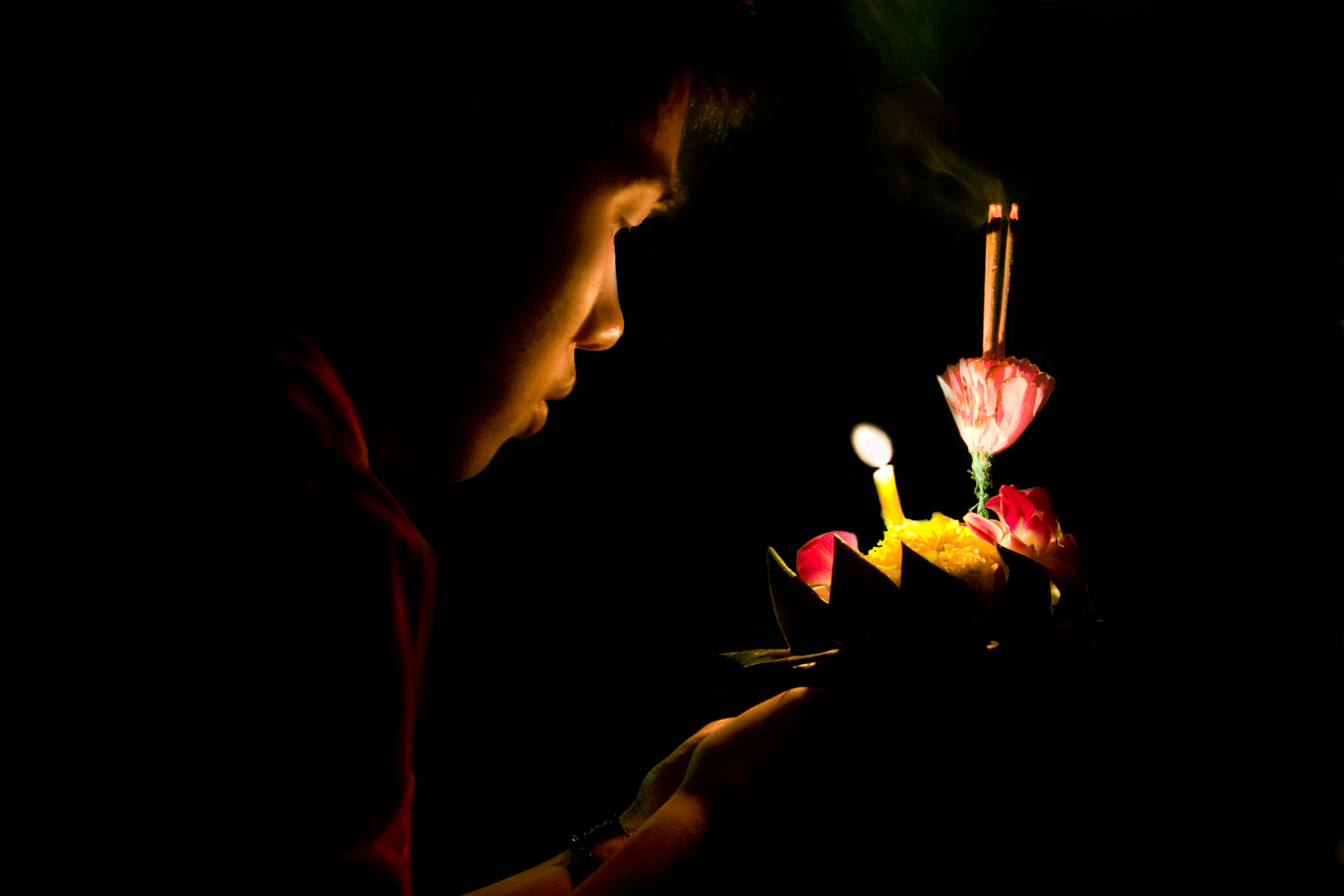
Loy Krathong 2007, Lumpini Park, Bangkok

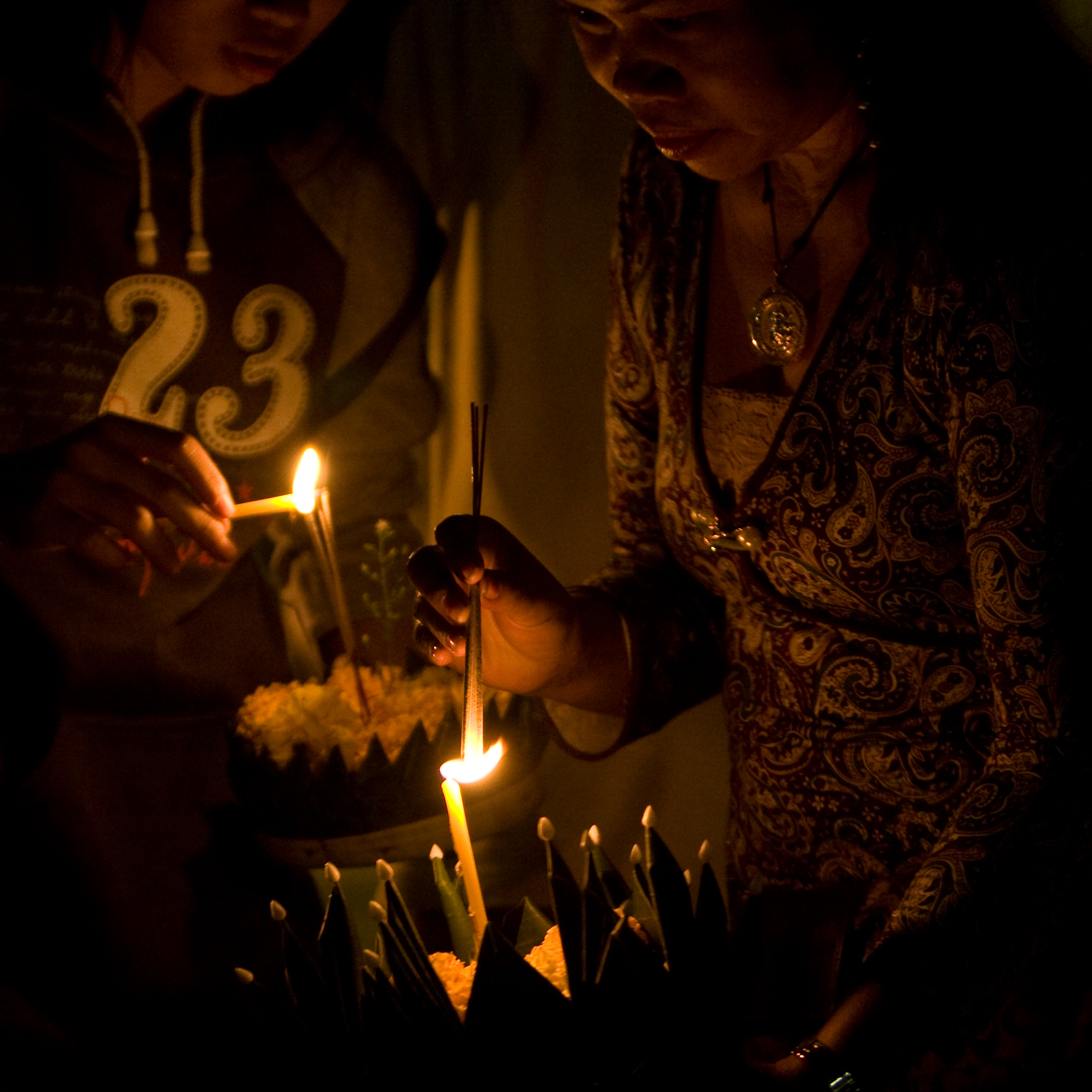
Loy Krathong 2007, Lumpini Park, Bangkok

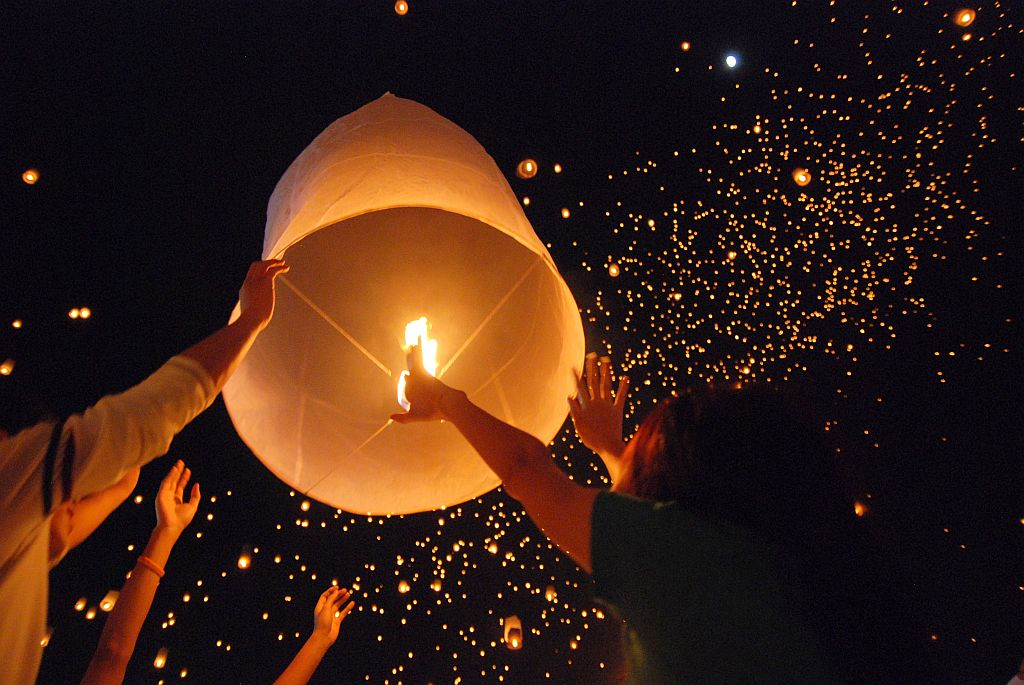
Launching khom loi, Yi Peng Festival, Mae Cho, Chiang Mai

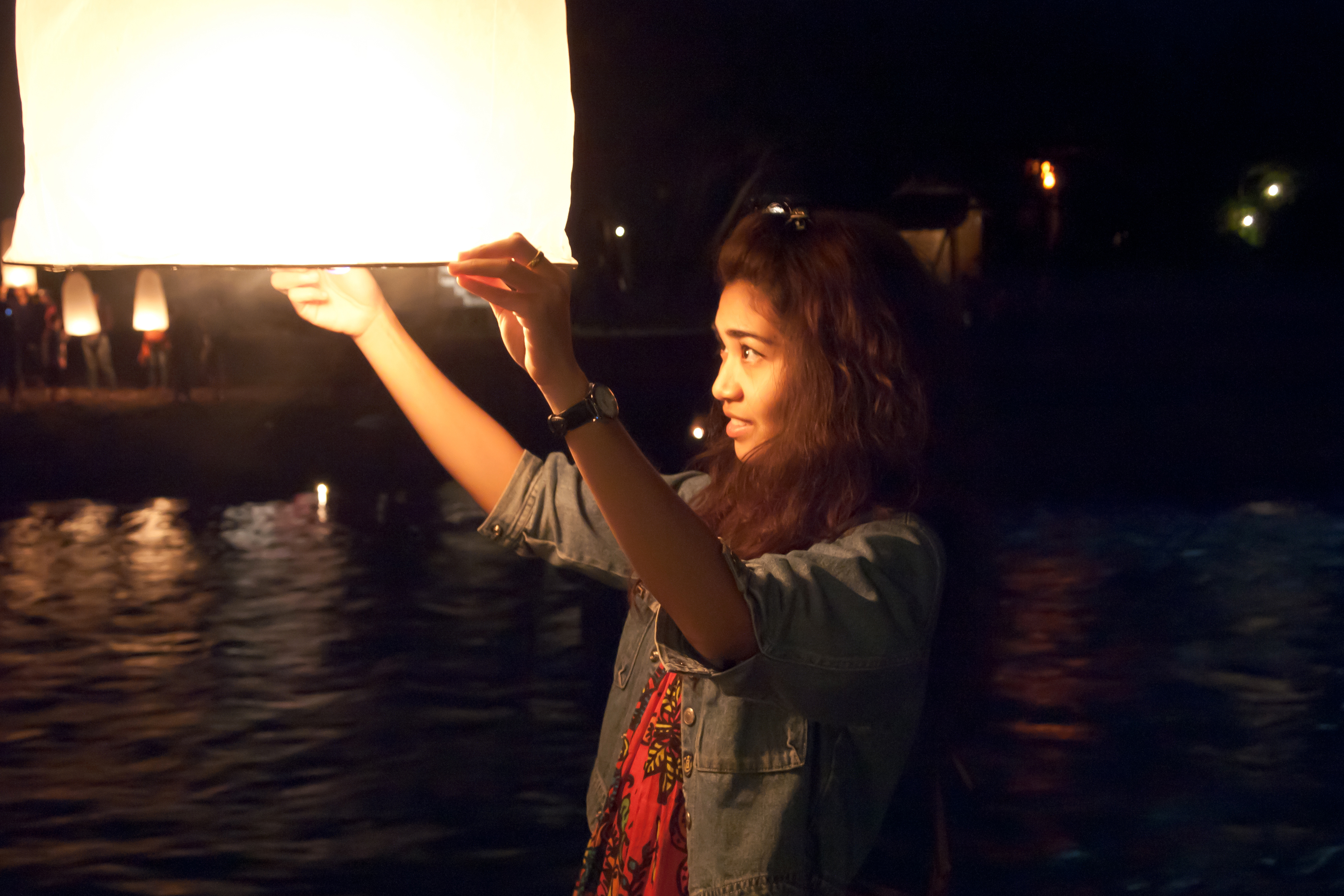
Launching a lantern

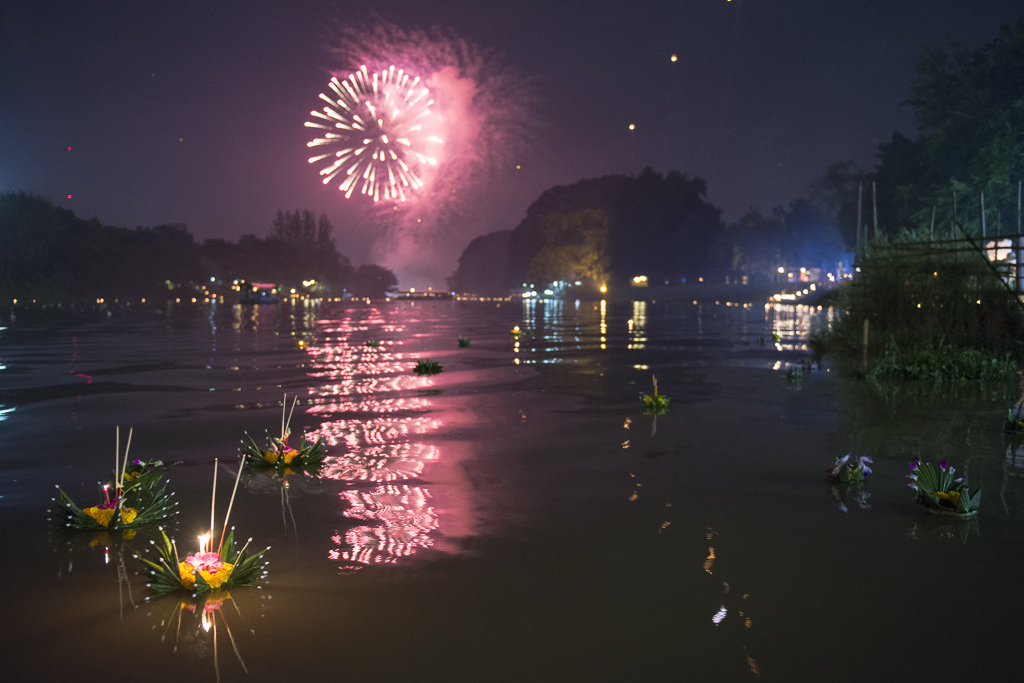
Loy Krathong 2014

== See also ==
- Public holidays in Thailand
- Thai folklore
- Similar festivals
  - Tazaungdaing festival – Myanmar equivalent of Loy Krathong
  - Mid-Autumn Festival - Chinese autumn lantern festival where the water lantern or lamp has been used for floating
  - Boita Bandana – Odia autumn festival when people float miniature boats with lighted lamps (diyas) on the rivers/sea.
  - Diwali – Indian light festival
  - Karthika Deepam - festival of lights observed in Kerala, Tamil Nadu and Sri Lanka.
  - Tōrō nagashi – Japanese lantern festival
- Leaf boat
- Thanksgiving
