= Bali Jatra =

Boita Bandana festival in Odisha, India

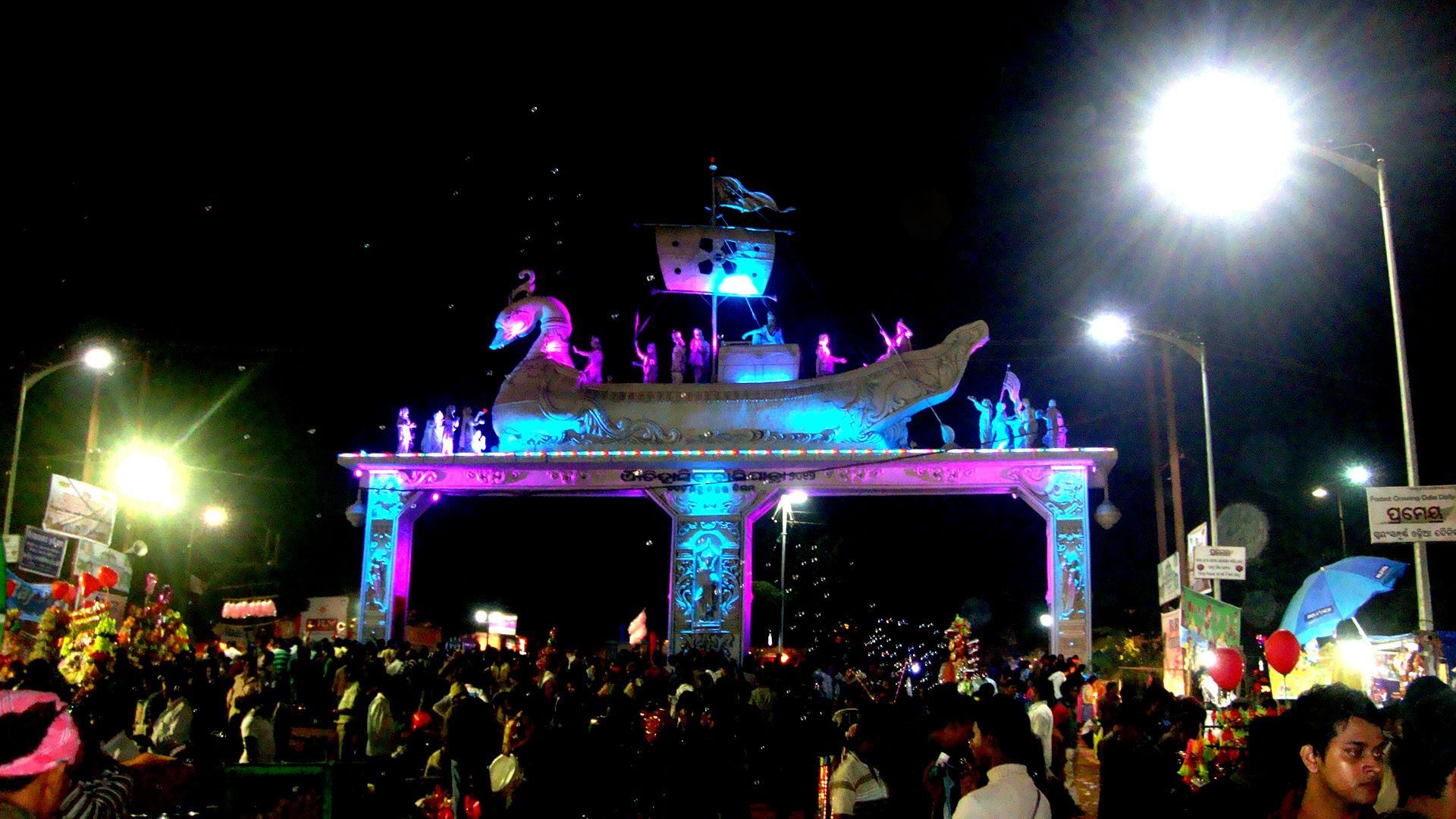
- Cuttack Bali Jatra
- Official name: Bali Jatra
- Also called: Voyage to Bali
- Observed by: Odias
- Type: Cultural
- Begins: On Boita Bandana in the month of Kartika in Odia calendar
- Ends: Various (usually in a week, or 9–10 days)
- Date: Kartika Purnima
- 2025 date: 5 to 12 November
- Frequency: Annual

Bāli Jātrā, (Odia: ବାଲିଯାତ୍ରା, lit. 'Voyage to Bali') pronounced [bali dʒat̪ɾa], is the major Boita Bandana festival held at Kataka on Kartika Purnima and lasts for 7 days or more, i.e. usually until Prathamastami. It is considered to be one of Asia's largest open trade fair. The festival is held in Odisha (a state in eastern India), in the city of Cuttack at Gadagadia Ghata of the Mahanadi river, to mark the day when ancient Sadhabas (Odia mariners) would set sail to distant lands of Bali, as well as Java (at the time of the voyage known as "Yawadvipa"), Sumatra, Borneo (all in Indonesia), and Sri Lanka (formerly Ceylon) for trade and cultural expansion. To commemorate this, the festival is celebrated every year from the day of Kartika Purnima (full moon day of the month of Kartika) to Prathamastami (eighth day of Margasira Krushna) according to the Odia calendar.

== Overview ==
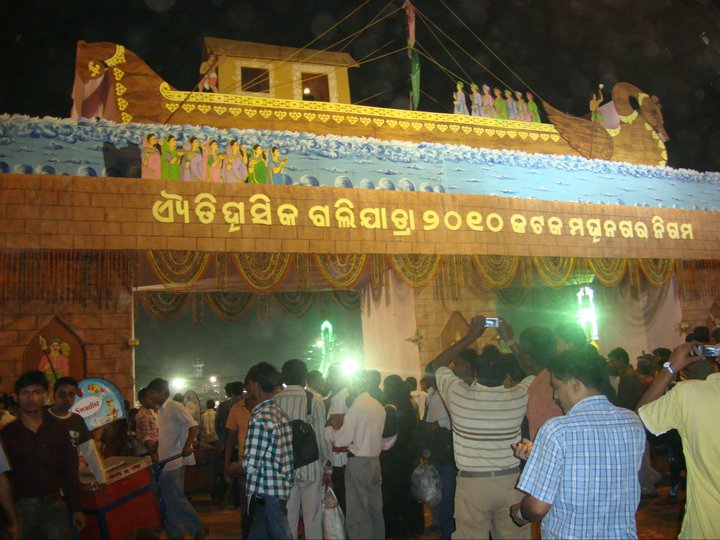
Cuttack Bali Jatra entrance gate (2010)

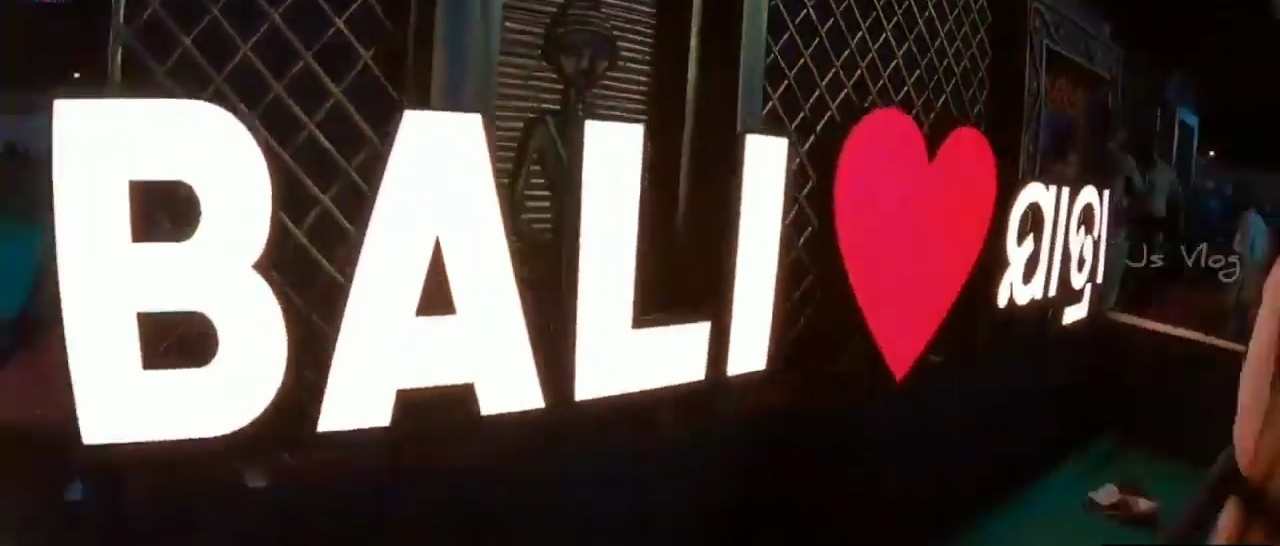
I Love Bali Jatra Stand

On Kartika Purnima, which comes around the end of October and November, people of Odisha gather near banks of Mahanadi, Brahmani river, other river banks, ponds, water tanks and sea shores to float miniature toy boats, made of colored paper, dried banana tree barks, and cork, as a symbolic gesture of their ancestors' voyage. These toy boats, usually launched early in the morning contain traditional paan and small oil lamps, which are lit and placed inside them, to provide an attractive sight during the festival. People sing a song Aa ka ma boi, pan gua thoi... to remember the early maritime history of Odisha. The song tells about four months that are important for marine merchants of Kalinga (the earlier name of Odisha). This festival is also celebrated with great fanfare in Paradeep. Bali Jatra bears testimony to the rich maritime legacy of ancient Odisha. This is the specific time that was considered auspicious by the Sadhabas to begin their voyage in vessels called Boitas. The voyage began on Kartika Purnima to take advantage of the favorable wind blowing during this time. Ajhala or big fabric sails were used to harness the wind power to move the Boitas.

Bali Jatra is also associated with Ta'apoi and rituals like Bhalukuni Osha or Khudurukuni Osha and Bada Osha. Ta'apoi is closely associated with the Bali Jatra festival, which recalls traditional memories of young maidens waiting for the return of their sailor brothers.

== Cuttack ==
In Cuttack, Bali Jatra is celebrated annually as a large open fair near the Barabati Fort area. There are several attractions for children like toy stalls, giant wheels, different games, maut ka kuan (literally well of death) and food stalls selling Odia delicacies (Cuttack Dahibara Aludum, Thunka puri, Kulfi, Gupchup, Mathura Cake, Banarasi Paan etc.) from different parts of the state, and other vendors selling toys, curiosities, and other gifts. Bali Jatra also witnesses a lot of cultural programs. Every year millions of people from all around the world visit Bali Jatra to experience it.

== Bali Jatra 2022 ==
Like most carnivals, Bali Jatra was also affected by the pandemic. Due to COVID-19 Bali Jatra was canceled in the year 2020 and 2021.

However, it came back in bigger and grander avatar in 2022. Under the leadership of new CMC Mayor Subhash Singh, District Collector Bhabani Shankar Chaini and Commissioner Pawan Kalyan, Balijatra was extended to 100 Acres and included additional attractions like water sports in Mahanadi river, Laser show, Cuttack-in-Cuttack (a model of most popular attractions in Cuttack) etc.

There were two stages, one Baishnab Pani Manch for organizing traditional cultural programme and another for holding modern cultural events catering to the young crowd. In addition to it a special pavilion was set up for holding discussion on different themes regarding the cultural heritage of Odisha. It also featured World’s biggest sand and diya installation art on Boita by Sudarsan Pattnaik.

Prime Minister Narendra Modi also mentioned the grandeur of Bali Jatra in his G20 speech in Bali.

== Mention in Guinness Book of World Records ==
In 2022, Bali Jatra etched its name in the Guinness Book of World Records at an event organised by the Cuttack Municipal Corporation under the leadership of Cuttack Mayor Subhash Singh and Commissioner Pawan Kalyan.

More than 2100 students of 22 schools made over 22,000 paper boats in 35 minutes, creating the world record.

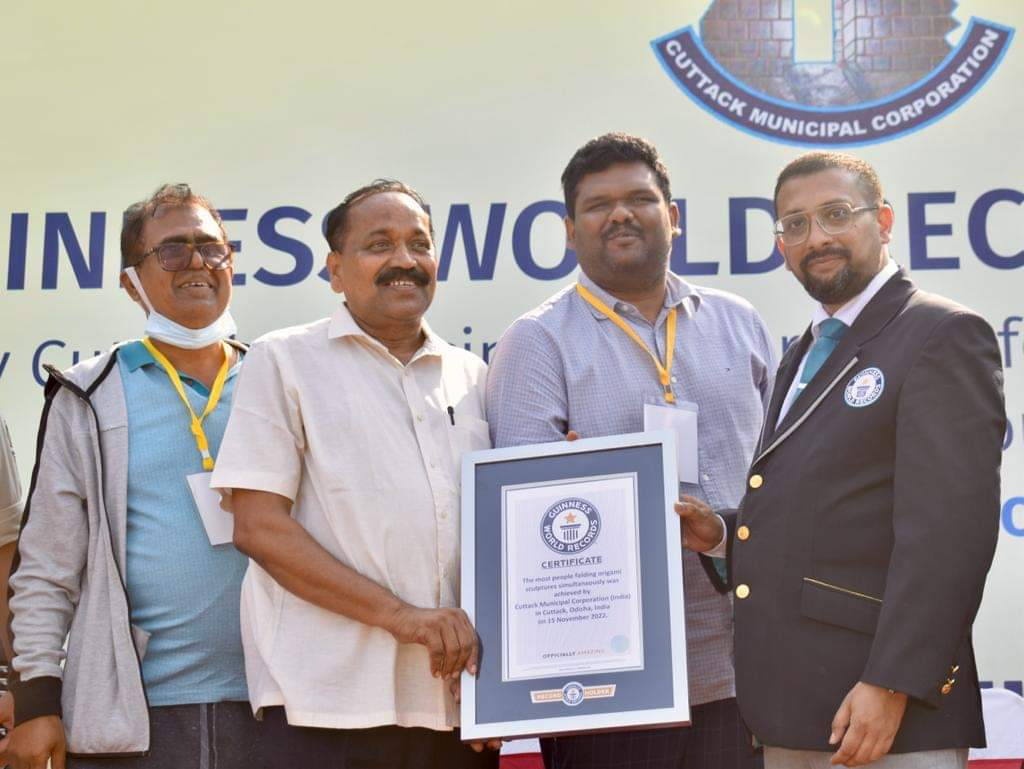
Guinness Book of World Record for Balijatra. Record Number of paper boats created under 35 mins. Initiative by CMC and Mayor Subhash Singh

== Other Bali Jatras ==
Apart from the major Bali Jatra held at Cuttack, other Bali Jatras are also held across the state. Some notable ones held are Kalinga Bali Jatra held at Paradeep, Chelitola Bali Jatra at Tirtol. The prominent Bali Jatra after Cuttack is the Kalinga Bali Jatra held at Paradeep since 1992. It was inaugurated by the then Chief Minister Biju Patnaik by flagging off the naval yacht INSV Samudra, which reached the port Benoa Harbour, Denpasar in Bali in 1993. The Kalinga Bali Jatra was an effort to recreate and revive the legacy of the historical and cultural links of the two regions which was connected by maritime trade.

== See also ==
- Greater India, for more information about Indian cultural influence in Southeast Asia
- Suvarnabhumi, a legendary eastern land of gold in classical Indian folklore located somewhere in Southeast Asia
