= Festivals of Odisha =

This article lists the traditional festivals and other cultural events in the Odisha region of India. Odisha celebrates 13 festivals in 12 months as the saying goes Bāra Māsare Tera Parba (transl. Thirteen festivals in twelve months).

== Major festivals ==
This section lists festivals which are celebrated throughout Odisha.

=== Autumn ===
==== Durga Puja ====
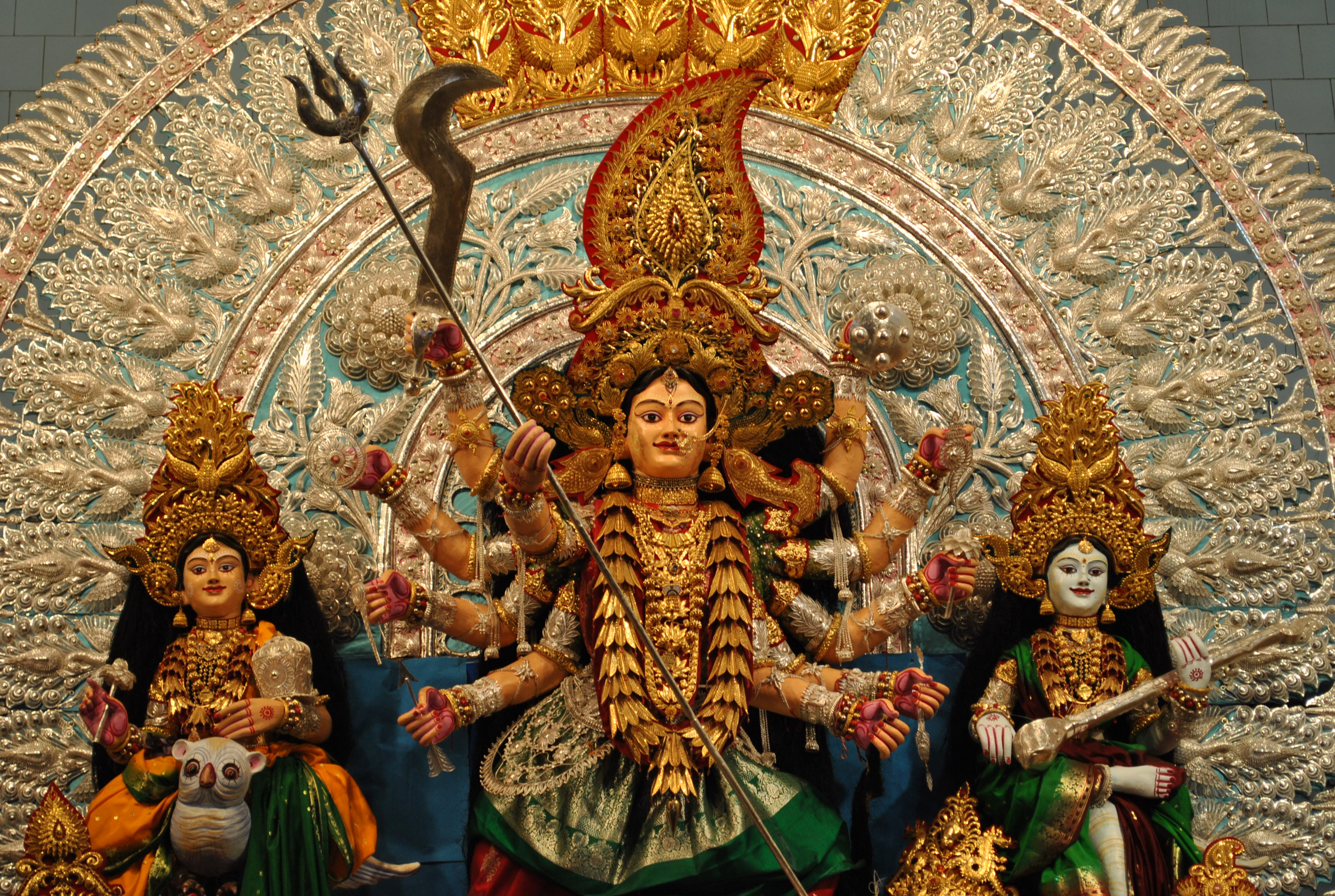
A Durga idol in Cuttack with a tarakasi crown.

Durga Puja (ଦୁର୍ଗା ପୂଜା) occurs in the month of Ashvin (October and September). It is a 10-day-long festival. During the period, goddess Durga is worshipped in Shakta pithas or temporary shrines called pandals. Navratri refers to the first nine days of the festival. The nine forms of Durga, Navadurga, are worshipped during these nine days. Navratri begins on the Prathama (first bright day) Paksha (lunar fortnight) of the Ashvin month. It also marks the end of the rainy season according to the traditional calendar. The asura, Mahishasura, was killed by Durga on the tenth day according to Hindu mythology. The final five days are considered especially important.

The Durga Puja of Cuttack is notable for its usage of silver and gold tarakasi (filigree) work on the crown of the idols and also on the pandals. The city Cuttack attracts many tourists during this period of the year. Special trains are run during this time to cater to the rise in tourist traffic. After the worship in Cuttack, on the tenth day of Vijayadashami, the idols are taken out in extravagant processions and are immersed in the Kathajodi river.

==== Kali Puja ====
Kali Puja occurs in the month of Ashvin (October). It is celebrated after Durga Puja ends. It is to commemorate the legendary tale of Goddess Kali dancing in anger and stepping over Lord Shiva & to celebrate the triumph of good over evil. It is considered a big festival in the northern districts of Odisha, such as Kendujhar. In particularly kendujhar district a week long mela goes on during Kali Puja. After the week is over the idol of Goddess Kali is taken on a grand procession and then submerged in a holy river or any water body nearby.

==== Kumar Purnima ====
Kumar Purnima (କୁମାର ପୂର୍ଣିମା) occurs on the first full moon day of the month of Ashvin. It is primarily celebrated by unmarried girls who pray for a handsome husband. According to the belief, the handsome god Kartikeya also known as Kumar was born on this day. Girls also play traditional games like puchi on this day and wear new clothes.

==== Deepabali ====
Deepabali (ଦୀପାବଳି) is celebrated on Kartik Amavasya.

The families remember their forefathers by burning jute stalks and call upon them for blessing with the Badabadua verse:

Bada badua ho,
andhara re aasa,
alua re jaa.
Mahaprasad khai
Baaisi pahaacha re gada gadu thaa.

ବଡ଼ ବଡୁଆ ହୋ,
ଅନ୍ଧାରରେ ଆସ,
ଆଲୁଅରେ ଯାଅ,
ମହାପ୍ରସାଦ ଖାଇ
ବାଇଶି ପାହାଚ ରେ ଗଡ଼ା ଗଡୁଥାଅ।

O forefathers,
come to us in this dark evening,
we light your way to heaven.
Having Mahaprasad,
May you attain salvation on the 22 steps of the Jagannath temple of Puri.

In some parts of the state, Kali Puja is also celebrated on the same day.

=== Winter ===
==== Prathamastami ====
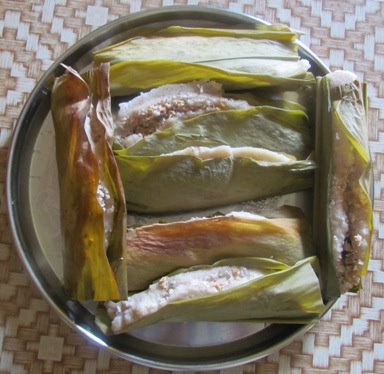
Enduri Pitha which is prepared on Prathamastami.

On Prathamastami (ପ୍ରଥମାଷ୍ଟମୀ), households pray for the long life of the firstborns. Enduri Pitha is a special delicacy which is prepared for this occasion. It has the cultural significance that first born were usually expected to take over as the family head. It falls on the eighth day of Margasira month.

=== Spring ===
==== Basant Panchami ====
Basanta Panchami (ବସନ୍ତ ପଞ୍ଚମୀ) occurs on the fifth day of the first lunar fortnight of Magha month (Magha Shukla Panchami), which usually falls in January or February. It is also observed as Saraswati Puja (ସରସ୍ୱତୀ ପୂଜା). Saraswati is the goddess of knowledge and wisdom in Hinduism. Traditionally, children get their letters on this day. Many educational institutions also observe the festival. It also marks the arrival of spring.

==== Maha Shivaratri ====
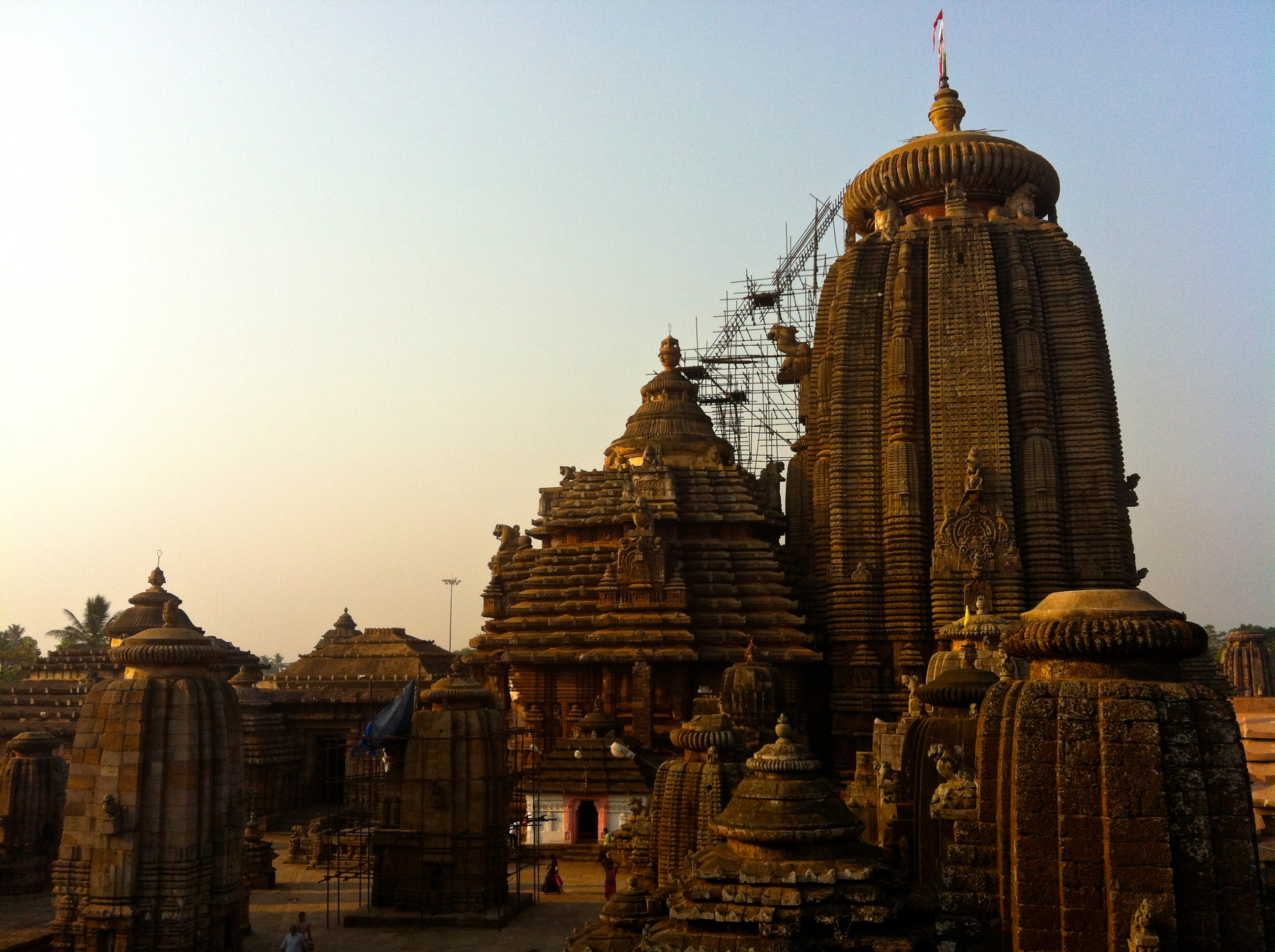
Lingaraja temple

Maha Shivaratri (ମହା ଶିବରାତ୍ରି) is celebrated on the 13th night or 14th day on the waning lunar fortnight in the Phalguna month. It usually falls in February or March. It is considered the night on which Shiva perform the Tandava dance. It is observed by fasting by adherents, especially. Married women pray for the well-being of their spouses. Unmarried women may pray for an ideal husband. Shiva temples are visited on this day and night. Bael fruit and leaves are offered to the god, who is worshiped in the form of a lingam. Worshipers may hold an all-night jagarana and break their fast the next morning.

Shivaratri is celebrated in major Shaivite temples like Lingaraja temple, Kapilash Temple, and Mukteswar temple. Shivaratri is also important to ascetics as Shiva is considered an ascetic god. Ascetics may partake in drinks like Thandai on this day.

==== Dola Purnima and Holi ====
It also known as Dola Yatra (Odia: ଦୋଳ ଯାତ୍ରା, a five-day long Dola Purnima festival celebrated with pomp and fervor across the state. Followed by Dola Purnima comes Holi. On this day, the Odia calendar becomes ready and is offered to the deity Jagannath, who is also known as "Dolagovinda". The celebration is mostly celebrated in Villages where Idols of Krishna and Radha come to a common place.

=== Summer ===
==== Ratha Yatra ====
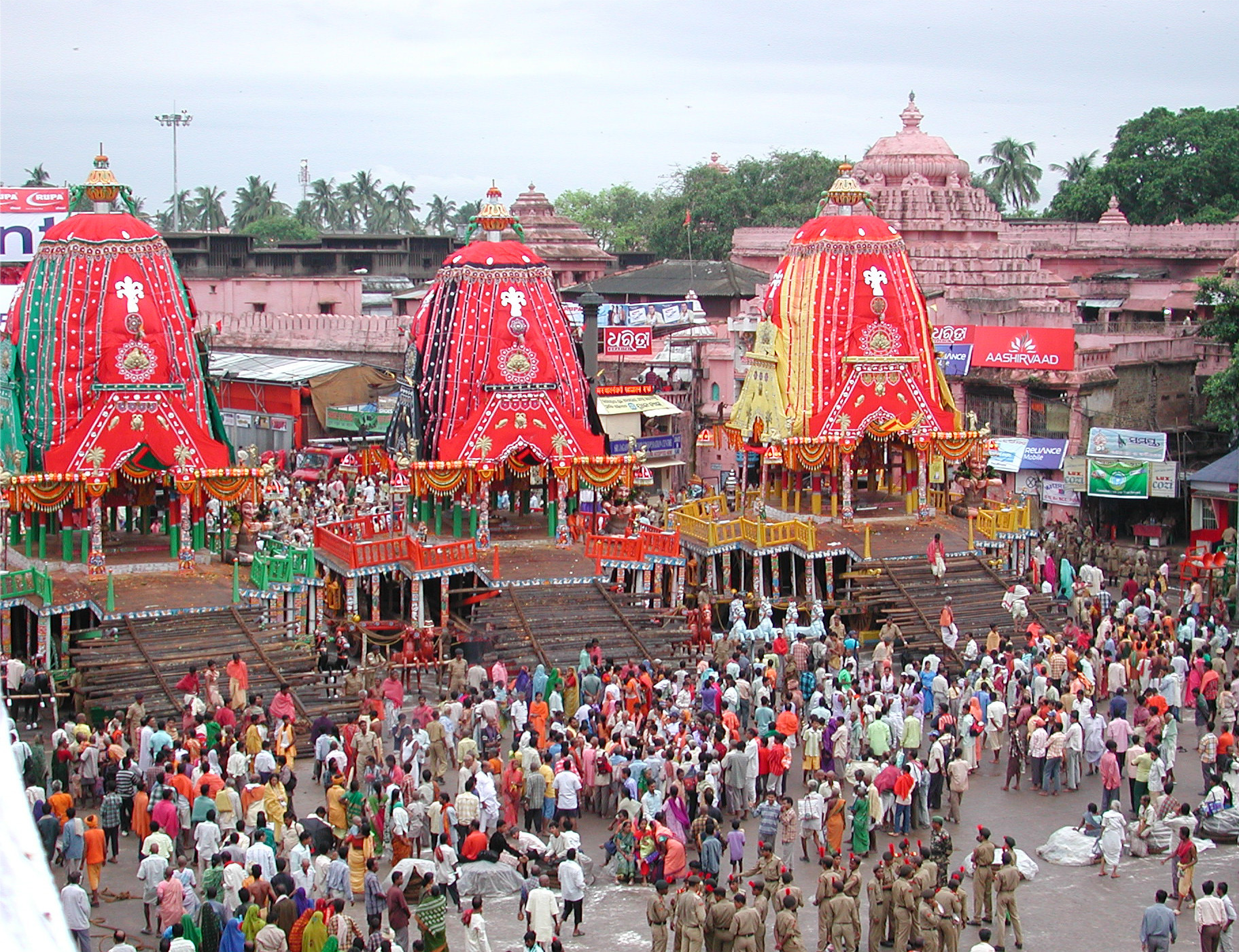
Rath Yatra in Puri (2007)

Ratha Yatra (ରଥଯାତ୍ରା) is an annual Hindu festival which originated in Puri in Odisha. The festival is celebrated all over Odisha on the 2nd day of dark fortnight the lunar month of Ashadha (Asadha Sukla Dutiya) usually in June/July. The festival involves transporting of the idols of the deities Jagannatha, Balabhadra and Subhadra on giant chariot from the Jagannath Temple to the Gundicha Temple. The chariots are pulled by devotees with ropes. After nine days, the idols are returned. The 2014 festival in Puri was attended by 900000 people.

=== Monsoon ===
==== Ganesh Chaturthi ====
Ganesh Chaturthi (ଗଣେଶ ଚତୁର୍ଥୀ) is celebrated as the birthday of the god Ganesh, usually in August. It is primarily observed by educational institutes and students. The god is offered prasad like modak and laddu in pandals. Students may also offer writing utensils and notebooks, which are used by them after the festival. During the festival, student do not undertake any study related activity. After Ganesh Visarjan, study activities are resumed.

== Regional festivals ==
This section lists festivals which are specific to a region.

=== Coastal Odisha ===
==== Raja Parba ====
Raja Parba (ରଜ ପର୍ବ) is a three-day festival celebrated in the coastal districts in Ashadha month starting with the first day of the month. It usually falls mid-June. This is festival dedicated to Basu-mata, the Earth goddess. During this period, no agricultural activities occur to allow the goddess to rest. The first day is called pahila raja, the second day is proper raja and third day is called basi raja.(Bhuin Na a na/ ଭୂଇଁ ନଅଣ) All the agricultural weapons got Wash and worshipped this day. Girls play on various types of swings. People exchange pithas among relatives and friends. Raja is also called Mithuna Sankranti. In places it is celebrated for four days and is known as Basumata Puja.

==== Bali Jatra/Kartika Purnima ====
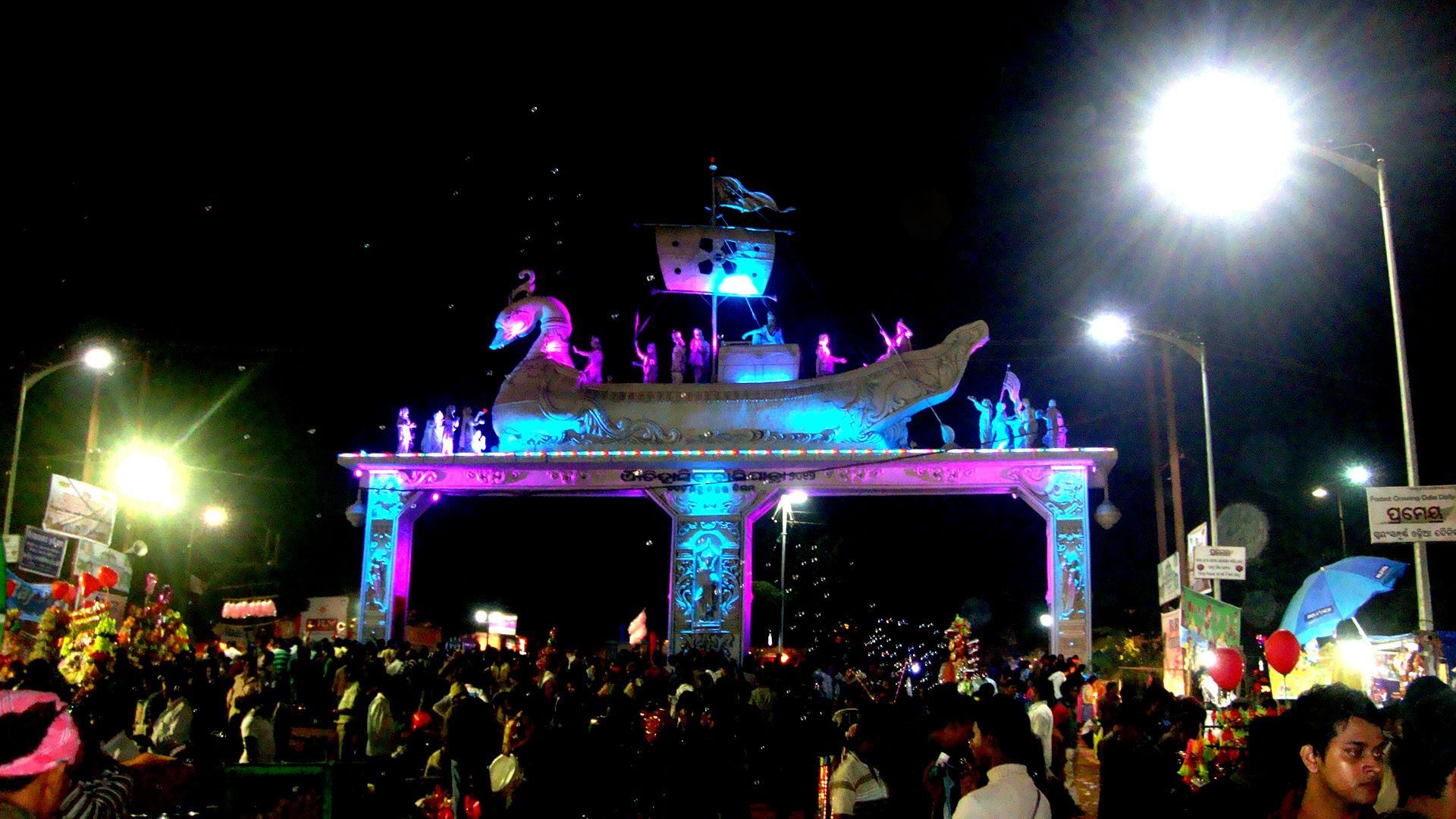
The entrance to the 2012 Bali Jatra trade fair in Cuttack.

Bali Jatra (ବାଲି ଯାତ୍ରା) is celebrated to mark the voyages made by ancient sea traders from Odisha to Bali. It falls on the day of Kartik Purnima. On this day, miniatures of the boats called boitas are released in ponds, rivers and the sea. The festival is celebrated for a week all across the state. A major annual trade fair is also held in Cuttack.

=== Central Odisha ===
==== Gajalaxmi Puja ====
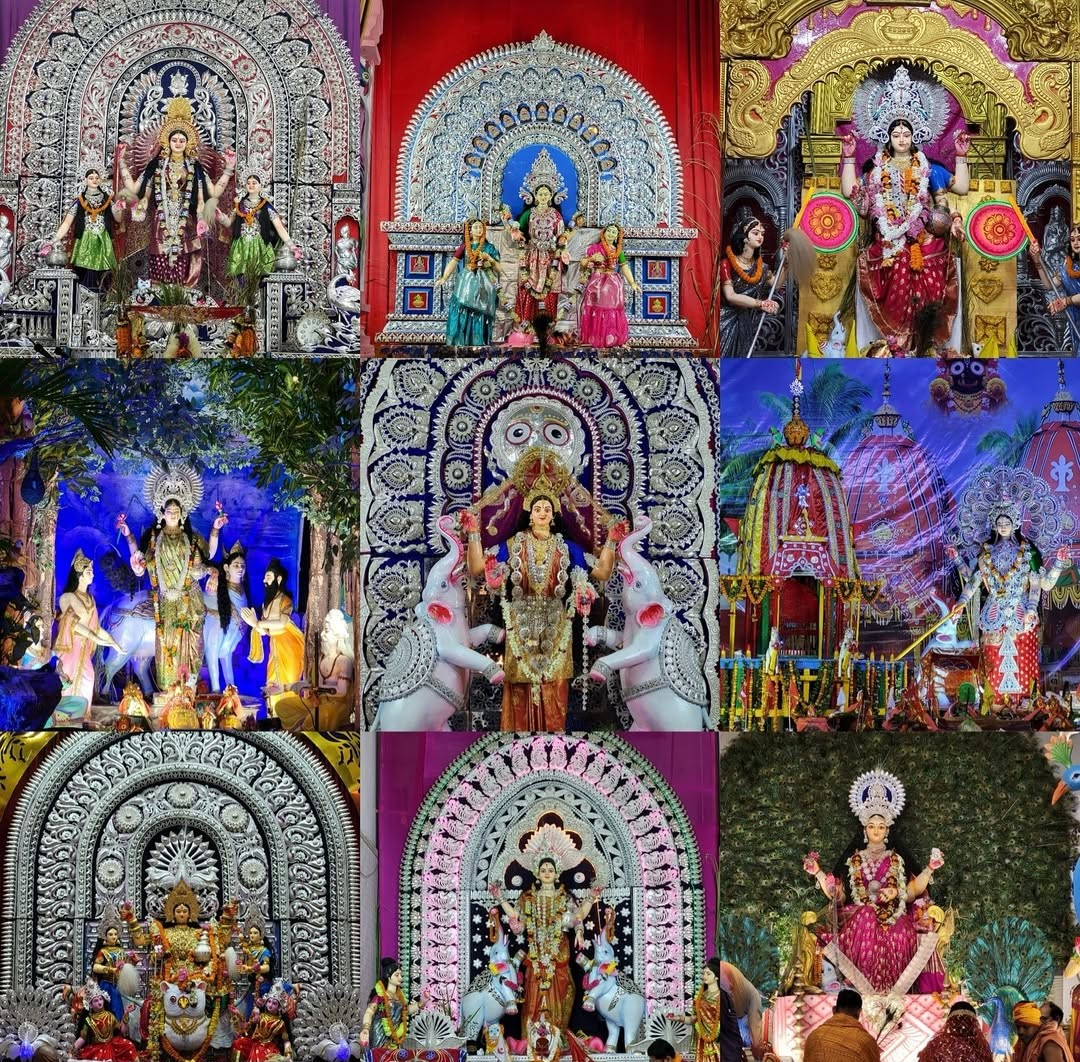
Dhenkanal's Gajalaxmi Puja

The Gaja-Lakshmi Puja (ଗଜଲକ୍ଷ୍ମୀ ପୂଜା) is celebrated primarily in Dhenkanal and Kendrapara town. It is an 11-day festival dedicated to Goddess Lakshmi, which begins on Kumar Purnima.

Dhenkanal's Gajalaxmi Puja is a major and famous festival of Odisha. It is an important part of the cultural identity not only of Dhenkanal district but of the entire state of Odisha. Every year, this puja begins on the full moon day of the Ashwina month, which is also known as Kumar Purnima, and is celebrated with great pomp and grandeur for about 11 days. During this time, the entire city of Dhenkanal remains immersed in a spiritual and festive atmosphere.

=== Western Odisha ===
==== Nuakhai ====
Nuakhai (ନୂଆ ଖାଇ) is particularly celebrated in the Sambalpuri cultural region. It is celebrated to welcome the new paddy (ଧାନ) harvest. It falls on the day after Ganesh Chaturthi. In various regions, priests calculate the tithi and offer the new grains to the local goddesses at a precise auspicious moment. People on this occasional greet each other with the words "Nuakhai Juhar". At evening, folk dance and song events may be organized which are called "Nuakhai Bhetghat".

==== Sitalasasthi ====
Sitalsasthi is celebrated to observe the marriage of god Shiva and Parvati. One of the devotees acts as the parent of Shiva and another devotee acts as the parent of Parvati. The devotee acting as the father of the god travels to the goddess's house with a bundle of sal tree leaves to make a proposal. After the marriage is fixed, deities of the locality and general public are invited to the ceremony. The general public also financially contributes to the ceremony. Sitalasasthi is also celebrated in many parts of South Ddisha mainly in Ganjam district and Brahmapur. The marriage ceremony is undertaken on the sixth day of Jyeshtha month. Various artists including eunuchs perform street performances during the festival.

==== Dhanu Jatra ====
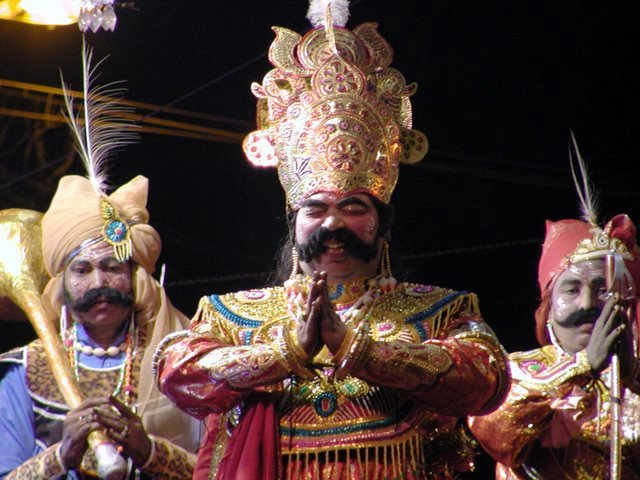
An actor playing king Kansa during Dhanu Jatra

Dhanu Jatra is a large-scale reenactment of the reign and death of the asura king Kansa which takes place annually in Bargarh. During the period of 1 to 11 January, the town of Bargarh is assumed to be the mythical city of Mathura. The neighboring settlements also take up names from the Mahabharata. The district collector and police superintendent also pretend to be employees of Kansa. The festival begins with the marriage of Vasudeva and Devaki. Ambapalli village is treated as Gopapur. During the festival, an actor pretending to be Kansa issues social messages which are contrary to mythical character.
