= Odia calendar =

Solar calendar used by the Odia people

The Odia calendar (Odia: ପାଞ୍ଜି Pāñji) is a solar calendar used by the Odia people from the Odisha region of the Indian subcontinent. The calendar follows the sidereal solar cycle while using the lunar Purnimanta phase for the religious dates. The New Year in the Odia calendar is known as Maha Bishuba Sankranti or Pana Sankranti. It occurs on the first day of the traditional solar month of Meṣa (Georgian: Aries), hence equivalent lunar month Baisakha (odia: ବୈଶାଖ). The Odia calendar follows the Utkaliya era, which began on Bhādra śukla dvādaśī from 592 CE.

== New Year and Era ==
As per the sidereal solar cycle followed by the Odia Panjika, the first day of the year or New Year falls on Mesa Sankranti (Sun-crossing into Sidereal Aries) in Mid-April. The Odia New Year festival is known as Pana Sankranti (Odia: ପଣା ସଂକ୍ରାନ୍ତି) or Maha Bishuba Sankranti (Odia: ମହା ବିଷୁବ ସଂକ୍ରାନ୍ତି).

The Utkaliya era (Odia: ଉତ୍କଳୀୟ Utkaḷiya) for the Odia calendar began on 592 CE on Bhādra sukḷa dvādasi (the 12th day of the full moon fortnight of the Bhādra month). Bhādra sukla dvādasi is considered to be the birthday of the legendary king Indradyumna who set up the icon of Lord Jagannath (Neela Madhava) at Puri. The epoch seems to correspond to the reign of the legendary early Somavamshis (Kesaris) as per the chronicle Madala Panji, thus implying the era was instituted by King Yayati I of the Somavamshi dynasty.

Thus the Era calendar new year falls on the 12th day of the full moon fortnight or the waxing moon lunar phase of the Bhādra month in September. This day is termed as the Odia financial New Year and is known as the festival of Sunia (Odia: ସୁନିଆଁ suniā̃) which denotes the start of the beginning of the new financial calendar year for the collection of revenue, publishing of almanacs and the palm-leaf horoscopes carrying the reigning year of the Gajapati King. Post-1947, it has been reduced as a ceremonial day and is mostly used in the Panji calendars to denote the change of Odia calendar year for records and horoscopes.

New Year Date
New Year	Odia month	Gregorian	Cycle
Odia New Year (Maha Bishuba Sankranti/Pana Sankranti)	୧ ବୈଶାଖ (ମେଷ); 1 Baiśākha (Meṣa)	14 April; 13 April (Gregorian leap year)	Solar
Odia financial New Year (Sunia)	ଭାଦ୍ର ଶୁକ୍ଳ ଦ୍ୱାଦଶୀ Bhādra Śukḷa Dwādaśī; 12th day of Waxing Moon (Full moon) phase	varies, September	Lunar

Odia year	Shaka year	Vikrami year	Gregorian year
୧୪୩୪ ଉତ୍କଳାବ୍ଦ/ଉତ୍କଳୀୟ ସନ; 1434 Utkaḷābda/Utkaḷiya San	1948 Śakābda	2083 Vikram Samvat	2026 CE

- Utkaḷābda year for 2026 on 23 September.

=== Anka year ===
The Anka year (Odia: ଅଙ୍କ Aṅka) system is a unique regnal year system instituted by the Eastern Ganga kings for dating their reigns. It had a number of features that mark the regnal year different from that actual duration of the year elapsed during the reign. The system still survives today and is used in the Odia panjis to mark the titular regnal year of the King of Puri, Gajapati Maharaja Dibyasingha Deb of the Puri Estate, whose title carries the legacy of historical ruling monarchs of Odisha.

Features:

- The Anka system always starts on the Odia financial new year called Sunia which falls on the 12th day of the bright fortnight of the month Bhadra (August–September) known as Bhadra Sukḷa Dwādasi. If the king accedes the throne for a few days before this date, then the first year of his reign would then just be a few days long.
- Coins were minted on the date of the new year, and hence the first coins were given the Anka year 2, the number 1 was not used.
- All years ending in 6 were skipped. As in the Anka year 5 was followed by Anka year 7, Anka year 15 was followed by Anka year 17 and so on.
- All years ending in 0 were also skipped, except for the Anka year 10.

Hence no Anka years exist for 1, 6, 16, 20, 26, 30, 36, 40, 46, 50, 56, and so on.

Timeline of actual Regnal year and Anka year (shown till regnal year 30)
Regnal year	1	2	3	4	5	6	7	8	9	10	11	12	13	14	15	16	17	18	19	20	21	22	23	24	25	26	27	28	29	30
Anka year	2	3	4	5	7	8	9	10	11	12	13	14	15	17	18	19	21	22	23	24	25	27	28	29	31	32	33	34	35	37

Regnal & Anka year of Gajapati (titular reign since 7 July 1970)
Gregorian year	Regnal year	Odia year	Anka year
2026 CE	56	୧୪୩୪ ଉତ୍କଳାବ୍ଦ; 1434 Utkaḷābda	୭୧ ଅଙ୍କ; 71 Aṅka

== Panji ==
Madala Panji (Odia: ମାଦଳ ପାଞ୍ଜି) is a chronicle of the Jagannath Temple, Puri in Odisha. It describes the historical events of Odisha related to Jagannath and the Jagannath Temple. The Madala Panji dates from the 12th century and was traditionally written on a year-to-year basis on Vijayadashami Day by the Karanas community. The tradition of keeping this chronicle began with Eastern Ganga king Anantavarman Chodaganga (1077–1150).

The modern Odia calendar begins with the scientific reforms initiated by the astronomer Pathani Samanta. His findings which included astronomical observations with the help of traditional instruments were recorded in his treatise Siddhanta Darpana written on palm-leaf manuscript in 1869 and eventually published in 1899. These observations were instrumental in the preparation of almanacs in Odisha especially by the astrologers of the Jagannath temple at Puri. The prominent Panjis of this tradition include:

- Khadiratna Panjika
- Samanta Panjika
- Biraja Panjika

Other notable Odia Panji calendars include Kohinoor Panji, Biraja Panji(Nanda), Radharaman Panji(based on Puri tradition Panjis), Bhagyadeepa Panji, Bhagyajyoti Panji, Bhagyachakra Panji.

== Months ==
Odia (Lunar) ମାସ māsa	Days	Odia (Solar) ରାଶି rāsi	Zodiac	Sign	Gregorian
ବୈଶାଖ; Baiśākha	31	ମେଷ; Mesa	Aries		April–May
ଜ୍ୟେଷ୍ଠ; Jyeṣṭha	31	ବୃଷ; Brusa	Taurus		May–June
ଆଷାଢ଼ Āṣāḍha	32	ମିଥୁନ; Mithuna	Gemini		June–July
ଶ୍ରାବଣ; Śrābaṇa	31	କର୍କଟ; Karkaṭa	Cancer		July–August
ଭାଦ୍ରବ/ଭାଦ୍ର; Bhādraba/Bhādra	31	ସିଂହ; Singha	Leo		August–September
ଆଶ୍ୱିନ; Āświna	31	କନ୍ୟା Kanyā	Virgo		September–October
କାର୍ତ୍ତିକ; Kārttika	30	ତୁଳା Tuḷā	Libra		October–November
ମାର୍ଗଶିର; Mārgaśira	29	ବିଛା Bichā	Scorpio		November–December
ପୌଷ; Pauṣa	29	ଧନୁ Dhanu	Sagittarius		December–January
ମାଘ; Māgha	30	ମକର; Makara	Capricorn		January–February
ଫାଲ୍‌ଗୁନ/ଫଗୁଣ; Phālguna/Phaguṇa	30	କୁମ୍ଭ; Kumbha	Aquarius		February–March
ଚୈତ୍ର; Chaitra	30	ମୀନ; Mina	Pisces		March–April

== Days ==
The Odia calendar incorporates the seven-day week.

Day (Odia)	Celestial object	Equivalent	Day (Gregorian)
ରବିବାର; Rabibāra	Surya	Sun	Sunday
ସୋମବାର; Somabāra	Chandra	Moon	Monday
ମଙ୍ଗଳବାର; Maṅgaḷbāra	Mangala	Mars	Tuesday
ବୁଧବାର; Budhabāra	Budha	Mercury	Wednesday
ଗୁରୁବାର; Gurubāra	Brihaspati	Jupiter	Thursday
ଶୁକ୍ରବାର; Śukrabāra	Shukra	Venus	Friday
ଶନିବାର; Śanibāra	Shani	Saturn	Saturday

== Seasons ==
Odia Rutu ଋତୁ	Season	Odia months	Months (Gregorian)
ଗ୍ରୀଷ୍ମ; Grīṣma	Summer	Baiśākha–Jyeṣṭha	April–June
ବର୍ଷା Barṣā	Monsoon	Āṣāṛha–Śrābaṇa	June–August
ଶରତ; Śarata	Autumn	Bhādraba–Āświna	August–October
ହେମନ୍ତ; Hemanta	Pre-Winter	Kārttika–Mārgaśira	October–December
ଶୀତ; Śīta	Winter	Pauṣa–Māgha	December–February
ବସନ୍ତ; Basanta	Spring	Phālguna–Chaitra	February–April

== Time ==
Time	Gregorian	Units	Equivalent
ଦିନ dina	Day	୧୨ ଘଣ୍ଟା 12 ghaṇṭā	12 hours
ରାତି rāti	Night	୧୨ ଘଣ୍ଟା 12 ghaṇṭā	12 hours
ଦିବସ dibasa	Solar day	୨୪ ଘଣ୍ଟା 24 ghaṇṭā	24 hours
୧ ସପ୍ତାହ; 1 saptaha	1 week	୭ ଦିନ; 7 dina	7 days
୧ ପକ୍ଷ; 1 pakṣa	1 fortnight	୧୫ ଦିନ; 15 dina	15 days
୧ ବର୍ଷ; 1 barṣa	1 year	୩୬୫ ଦିନ; 365 dina	365 days
୧ ବର୍ଷ; 1 barṣa	1 year	୧୨ ମାସ; 12 māsa	12 months

Lunar week
Paksha ପକ୍ଷ (pakhya)	Period	Lunar phase	Days
ଶୁକ୍ଳପକ୍ଷ śukḷapakṣa	From ଅମାବାସ୍ୟା (Amābāsyā) to ପୂର୍ଣ୍ଣିମା (Pūrṇṇima); New moon to Full moon	Waxing moon	15 days
କୃଷ୍ଣପକ୍ଷ krushṇapakṣa	From ପୂର୍ଣ୍ଣିମା (Pūrṇṇima) to ଅମାବାସ୍ୟା (Amābāsyā); Full moon to New moon	Waning moon	15 days

Lunar Day ତିଥି (tithi)	Bright fortnight ଶୁକ୍ଳପକ୍ଷ (śukḷapakṣa)	Lunar phase	Dark fortnight କୃଷ୍ଣପକ୍ଷ (krushṇapakṣa)	Lunar phase
1	ପ୍ରତିପଦ pratipada	Waxing Crescent	ପ୍ରତିପଦ pratipada	Waning Gibbous
2	ଦ୍ୱିତୀୟା dwitīyā	Waxing Crescent	ଦ୍ୱିତୀୟା dwitīyā	Waning Gibbous
3	ତୃତୀୟା trutīyā	Waxing Crescent	ତୃତୀୟା trutīyā	Waning Gibbous
4	ଚତୁର୍ଥୀ caturthī	Waxing Crescent	ଚତୁର୍ଥୀ caturthī	Waning Gibbous
5	ପଞ୍ଚମୀ pañcamī	Waxing Crescent	ପଞ୍ଚମୀ pañcamī	Waning Gibbous
6	ଷଷ୍ଠୀ ṣaṣṭhī	Waxing Crescent	ଷଷ୍ଠୀ ṣaṣṭhī	Waning Gibbous
7	ସପ୍ତମୀ saptamī	First Quarter	ସପ୍ତମୀ saptamī	Last Quarter
8	ଅଷ୍ଟମୀ aṣṭamī	First Quarter	ଅଷ୍ଟମୀ aṣṭamī	Last Quarter
9	ନବମୀ nabamī	Waxing Gibbous	ନବମୀ nabamī	Waning Crescent
10	ଦଶମୀ daśamī	Waxing Gibbous	ଦଶମୀ daśamī	Waning Crescent
11	ଏକାଦଶୀ ekādaśī	Waxing Gibbous	ଏକାଦଶୀ ekādaśī	Waning Crescent
12	ଦ୍ୱାଦଶୀ dwādaśī	Waxing Gibbous	ଦ୍ୱାଦଶୀ dwādaśī	Waning Crescent
13	ତ୍ରୟୋଦଶୀ trayodaśī	Waxing Gibbous	ତ୍ରୟୋଦଶୀ trayodaśī	Waning Crescent
14	ଚତୁର୍ଦ୍ଦଶୀ caturddaśī	Waxing Gibbous	ଚତୁର୍ଦ୍ଦଶୀ caturddaśī	Waning Crescent
15	ପୂର୍ଣ୍ଣିମା pūrṇṇima	Full Moon	ଅମାବାସ୍ୟା amābāsyā	New Moon

== Festivals ==
Odia and other Indian festivals observed as per Odia calendar:

Months	Festivals
Baisākha	Maha Bishuba Sankranti (Pana Sankranti)
Jyesṭha	Buddha Purnima, Akshaya Tritiya, Sabitri Brata, Sitalsasthi
Āsāḍha	Raja Parba, Ratha Jatra
Srābaṇa	Gamha Purnima (Raksha Bandhan)
Bhādraba	Krishna Janmashtami, Ganesh Chaturthi, Nuakhai, Sunia
Āswina	Vishwakarma Puja, Mahalaya, Durga Puja, Dusehra, Kumara Purnima
Kārttika	Kali Puja, Dipabali, Jagaddhatri Puja, Boita Bandana, Bali Jatra
Mārgasira	Prathamastami, Manabasa Gurubara
Pausa	Dhanu jatra, Samba Dashami, Pousha Purnima
Māgha	Makar Sankranti, Vasant Panchami
Phālguna	Maha Shivaratri
Chaitra	Holi (Dol Purnima), Odisha Day (Utkala Dibasa)
