= Michael Blümelhuber =

Austrian artist

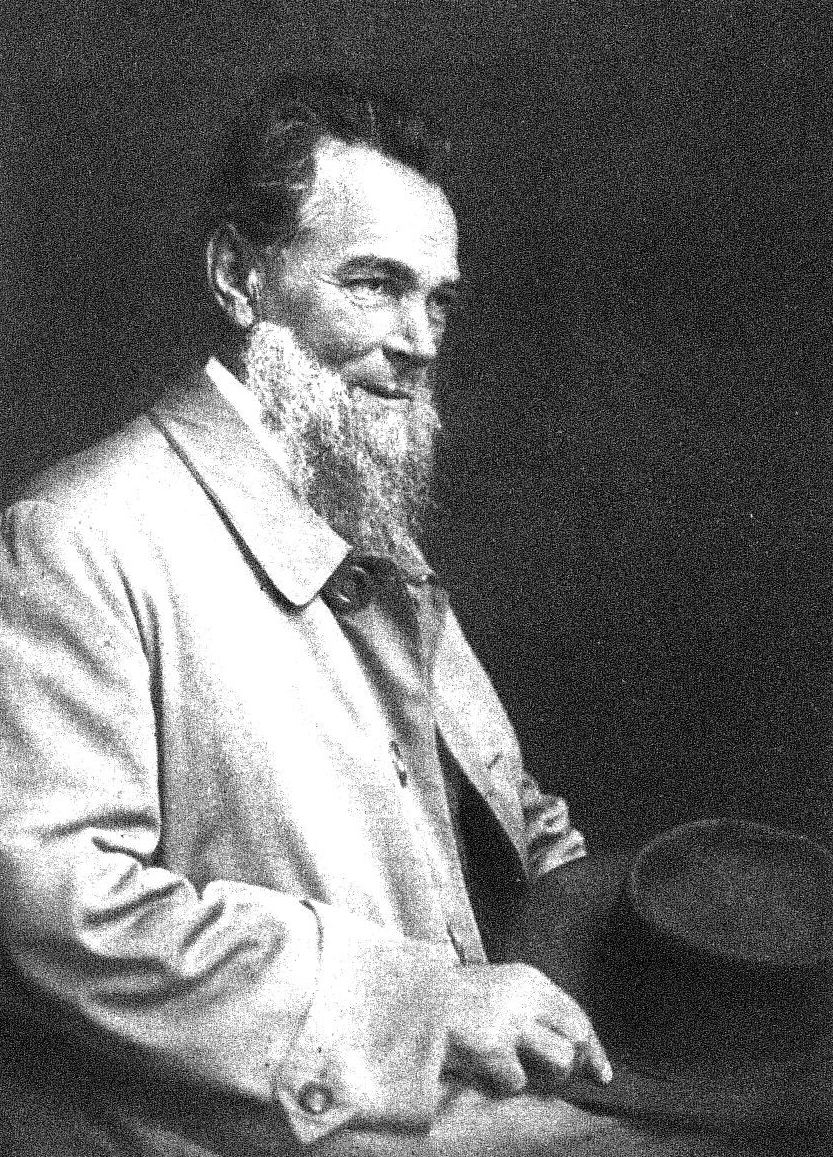
- Born: September 23, 1865; Christkindl, Unterhimmel-Christkindl
- Died: January 1936 (aged 70); Steyr
- Occupation: metalcutter
- Style: Ajoure

Michael Blümelhuber (born September 23, 1865, Christkindl, Unterhimmel-Christkindl (now a part of Steyr), Upper Austria — January 1936, Steyr) was an Austrian metalcutter. In 1910 he founded a master craftsman studio in Steyr, which closed in 1943. By the use of the Ajoure technique (often mislabeled as filigree) he brought metalcutting to a higher artistic level. He became internationally known through his participation in the World Fairs 1900 in Paris and 1902 in London.
