= Gopaipali =

- village
- Location in Odisha, India Gopaipali (India)
- Coordinates: 21.20120°N 83.57363°E
- Country: India
- State: Odisha
- District: Bargarh
- Elevation (Above MSL): 178 m (584 ft)

Population (2011)
  - Total: 1,322

Languages
  - Official: Odia
  - Local: Sambalpuri
- Time zone: UTC+5:30 (IST)
- Postal code: 768029
- Vehicle registration: OD
- Website: odisha.gov.in

Gopaipali is a small village under Barpali block in Bargarh District with village code 72500 as per 2001 Census.

== Location ==
Gopaipali is a village in Barpali Tehsil in Bargarh District of Odisha State. It is located 19 km towards South from District headquarters Bargarh and 299 km from State capital Bhubaneswar. Gopaipali is surrounded by Bijepur Tehsil towards the west, Bargarh Tehsil towards North, Dunguripali Tehsil towards the south and Bheden Tehsil towards the east. The village is 178 m (584 ft) above sea level. Bargarh, Burla, Sambalpur and Balangir are the nearby cities to Gopaipali.

== Demographics ==
According to 2011 Census of India, Gopaipali has 377 families with a population of 1,322. The male population is 722 and female population is 673. The population of children between 0 and 6 years of age is 145. Though the average sex ratio is 932 (lower than that of Odisha: 979); the child sex ratio is 1042, which is overwhelmingly high.

The literacy rate of Gopaipali is 71.28%; slightly lower than 72.87%, the average literacy of Odisha. The male literacy is 80.95% and female literacy is 60.77%.

=== Religion ===
Almost all of the villagers are Hindu.

== Administration ==
Gopaipali village is a part of the Gopaipali Gram Panchayat. As per the Panchayati Raj Act, Gopaipali village is administrated by a Sarpanch elected by the eligible citizens in the Gopaipali Gram Panchayat. It comes under the Barpali Panchayat Samiti, and Bargarh Zila Parishad.

The village is divided into 5 wards, each having its own elected ward member who represent the ward in the Gram Panchayat.

== Facilities ==
The Gram-Panchayat office of the Gopaipali Gram-Panchayat is situated in the village. Gopaipali UGUPS, a primary school and Gopaipali High School, a secondary school provide for the education facility. Apart from that the village has a youth club and a post-office with PIN 768029 under Barpali Post Office.

== Communication ==
- By rail:
  The nearest railway station to Gopaipali is Barpali Railway Station (BRPL), which is just 3 km away from the village. Other major stations include Bargarh (20 km away), Sambalpur (70 km away) and Dunguripali (17 km away).
- By road:
  The village is well connected to Barpali and Sohela by road. The communication is facilitated by bus and rickshaws.

== Festivals ==
As a typical western Odisha village, the festivals Nuakhai and Durga Puja etc. are observed with much celebration. Most of the festivals are also inspired by the Odia culture. However, the festival Sitalsasthi is celebrated with great pomp and gaiety, wherein the marriage between Lord Shiva and Goddess Parvati is depicted each year. Besides that, the Nama sankeerthanam takes place in the village each year during the advent of the spring.

== Economy ==
The economy of the village is largely dependent on agriculture, though small scale industries are ushering up these days.

- Agriculture:
  It is the backbone of the economy of the village. Mostly rice is grown, only in Kharif season, because of the poor irrigation facilities. Pulses and groundnut is grown in Rabi season. Irrigation is primarily dependent on rain and two tanks in the village. However, use of groundwater through bore-wells for irrigation is increasingly getting popular and therefore sweet cane and onion are being grown these days, albeit in smaller scale.
- Small Scale Industries:
  Some small scale industries like brickworks, mechanised threshers for rice and wheat etc. are coming up nowadays.

== See also ==
- Barpali
- Bargarh
- Sitalsasthi
- Nuakhai
