= Remta =

- village
- Location in Odisha, India Remta (India)
- Coordinates: 21.200993°N 83.619457°E
- Country: India
- State: Odisha
- District: Bargarh
- Elevation (Above MSL): 178 m (584 ft)

Languages
  - Official: Oriya
  - Local: Sambalpuri
- Time zone: UTC+5:30 (IST)
- Postal code: 768029
- Vehicle registration: OD
- Website: odisha.gov.in

Remta is a small village under Barpali block in Bargarh District, Odisha, India.

== Location ==
Remta is a village situated 3 km from the block/tehsil headquarters at Barpali, which is the nearest town, and 27km away from Bargarh, the district headquarters of the eponymous district.

== Demographics ==
The total geographical area of village is 562 hectares. Remta has a total population of 2,649 people. There are about 680 houses in Remta village. Barpali is the nearest town to Remta. The main occupation of the villagers is cultivation, about 99% of the people are associated with farming. & Some people are in service sector jobs.

Remta has a gram panchayat office according to 2009 statistics.. Remta Gram panchyat includes Dhirpur and Krushakpalli two near by villages. The village also has a government high school named Government High School, Remta, kalyan mandap, primary veterinary, and a post office in service. According to Census 2011 information the location code or village code of Remta village is 380445.

== Culture ==
The village is known for its temples, which include Gopalji Temple at the centre of the village, Lingaraj Temple, Dwarpal Temple, Samleswari Temple, Kalika Devi Temple, Mangala Temple, and Gramadevi Temple.

The festival of Nuakhai is celebrated at a great way in this village. The youth association named "Yuva Jyoti Sanskritika Sangha" celebrates Nuakhai Eve as part of their cultural entertainment programme. Durga Puja in Dussera has been celebrated in this village since 2012.
