= Silver Filigree of Karimnagar =

Silver filigree from India

Karimnagar Silver Filigree is a silver filigree made in Karimnagar, India. It is an ancient art of Karimnagar.

== History ==
The art form was patronised during the rule of the Nizams of Hyderabad, and noblemen commissioned elaborate pieces. These are displayed in the Salar Jung Museum.

Karimnagar Silver Filigree received Intellectual property rights protection or Geographical Indication (GI) status in 2007.

== See also ==
- Bidriware
- List of Geographical Indications in India
- Tarakasi
