= Barapali =

Barpali Barpali
- Town
- Location in Barpali, Odisha, India
- Coordinates: 21.2°N 83.5833°E
- Country: India
- State: Odisha
- District: Bargarh

Area
  - Total: 287.06 km^{2} (110.83 sq mi)
- Elevation: 182 m (597 ft)

Languages
  - Official: Odia
  - Local: Sambalpuri
- Time zone: UTC+5:30 (IST)
- Postal code: 768029
- Vehicle registration: OD-17
- Website: www.nacbarpali.in

Barpali is a town and a block headquarters, administered as a Notified Area Council, in the Bargarh district of the Indian state of Odisha. The town holds a place of high honor in the state's literary and cultural history as the birthplace of Swabhaba Kabi Gangadhar Meher, one of the most renowned poets in Odia literature, whose legacy is deeply ingrained in the local identity.

Beyond its literary heritage, Barpali is recognized for traditional arts and crafts. It is known for Sambalpuri sarees, which are created by local weavers using the tie-dye technique known as Bandha Kala or Ikat. Alongside this textile industry, the town's artisans also produce terracotta handicrafts. Important religious sites include the Ashtashambu temple complex, and the celebration of festivals such as Sital Sasthi.

Barpali falls under the Bijepur assembly constituency and the Bargarh Lok Sabha parliamentary constituency.

== Location ==
Barpali is situated in the Bargarh district of Odisha, India. The town's geographical coordinates are 21.1813° N latitude and 83.5976° E longitude, with an average elevation of 182 meters (597 ft) above sea level.

The town is strategically positioned on key road networks. It lies on the route connecting the district headquarters of Bargarh with other parts of the region. This provides Barpali with access to major transportation corridors, including the National Highway network that links significant locations such as Raipur and Puri, facilitating both commercial and passenger movement.

== Demographics ==
As of 2011 Census of India, the Barpali Block had a total population of 128,271. Of these, 65,595 were males and 62,676 were females, yielding a sex ratio of 955 females for every 1,000 males. The population in the 0–6 year age group was 13,377, constituting 10.4% of the total, with a child sex ratio of 978.

The block is predominantly rural, with 83.7% of residents living in rural areas and 16.3% in urban centers. The overall literacy rate was 76.51%, showing a disparity between male literacy at 85.54% and female literacy at 67.03%. Socially, Scheduled Castes made up 21.2% of the population, and Scheduled Tribes comprised 12.4%. The primary religion was Hinduism, followed by 99.38% of the population.

In terms of the workforce, 67,258 people were engaged in work activities, with 62.9% classified as main workers (employed for more than six months) and 37.1% as marginal workers. Administratively, the block is composed of 23 Gram Panchayats and 147 villages. For electoral representation, Barpali falls under the Bijepur Vidhan Sabha constituency and the Bargarh Lok Sabha constituency.

== Religious culture ==
Barpali has a rich and vibrant religious life, deeply rooted in Hindu traditions, particularly Shaivism and Shaktism. The town's cultural fabric is woven with numerous temples and year-round festivals.

- Temples and Shrines:
  - The town and its surrounding areas are home to over 30 temples.
  - The most significant religious site is the Ashtashambu, a sacred complex of eight different temples dedicated to Lord Shiva. This makes Barpali an important center for followers of Shaivism in the region.
- Major Festivals:
  - Sital Sasthi: This is one of the most prominent festivals in Barpali, celebrating the divine marriage of Lord Shiva and Goddess Parvati. According to local folklore, the festival has been celebrated for over a thousand years. The celebrations are marked by grand processions and festive Jatras (journeys) of the deities.
  - Nuakhai: As with the rest of Western Odisha, Nuakhai is the most important agrarian festival. It celebrates the new harvest ('Nua' meaning new and 'khai' meaning eat), where the first grains of the season are offered to the presiding local deity before being consumed by the community.
  - Dussehra and Durga Puja: The nine-day festival of Navaratri is celebrated with great enthusiasm, culminating in Dussehra. According to the local organizing committee, the public celebration of Durga Puja has been held since 1877. The festivities conclude with Ravan Dahan, the ritual burning of an effigy of the demon king Ravana, symbolizing the victory of good over evil.
  - Kali Puja: This is another major festival, dedicated to the Goddess Kali. It is typically celebrated after Durga Puja, often coinciding with the festival of Diwali.
- Regional Context:
  - Being in the Bargarh district, the cultural ethos of Barpali is also influenced by the world's largest open-air theatre, the Bargarh Dhanu Yatra, which takes place in the nearby district headquarters.

== Educational institutions ==
Barpali has a well-established educational infrastructure, with institutions providing instruction from the primary to the post-graduate level. The town is notable for its historic schools, some of which were founded in the late 19th and early 20th centuries, reflecting a long-standing commitment to education in the region.

=== Higher Education ===
The town serves as a center for higher education in the area, with several colleges offering undergraduate and specialized courses.

- Barpali College: A prominent degree college in the region, it is affiliated with Sambalpur University and offers undergraduate programs in Arts, Science, and Commerce.
- Pharmaceutical College, Barapali (Estd. 1986): A specialized institution that provides diploma-level education and training in the field of pharmacy.
- Women's Junior College, Barapali: This institution focuses on higher secondary (+2) education specifically for female students.

=== High Schools ===
Barpali is home to several well-regarded government high schools that serve students from the town and surrounding villages.

- Government Boys' High School, Barapali (Estd. 1944)
- Government Girls' High School, Barapali (Estd. 1964)
- Gangadhar NAC High School (Estd. 1975)

=== Primary and Upper Primary Schools ===
The foundation of the town's educational system is its network of primary schools, including several with significant historical roots.

- Historic Schools:
  - Girls' Primary School, Barapali (Estd. 1884): One of the oldest institutions in the region, serving the community for over 140 years.
  - Boys' Primary School, Barapali (Estd. 1910): Another century-old school that has been central to primary education in the town.
- Other Notable Schools:
  - Hatpada Primary School (Estd. 1953)
  - Samaleswari UG/UP School (Estd. 1959)
  - Gangadhar Project UG/UP School (Estd. 1978)
  - Modern Public School, Barapali (Estd. 1986)
  - Saraswati Shishu Mandir, Barapali (Estd. 1990)
  - Little Angels Public School (Estd. 2000)

== See also ==
- Gopaipali
