= Enduri pitha =

Variety of pitha made in Odisha, India

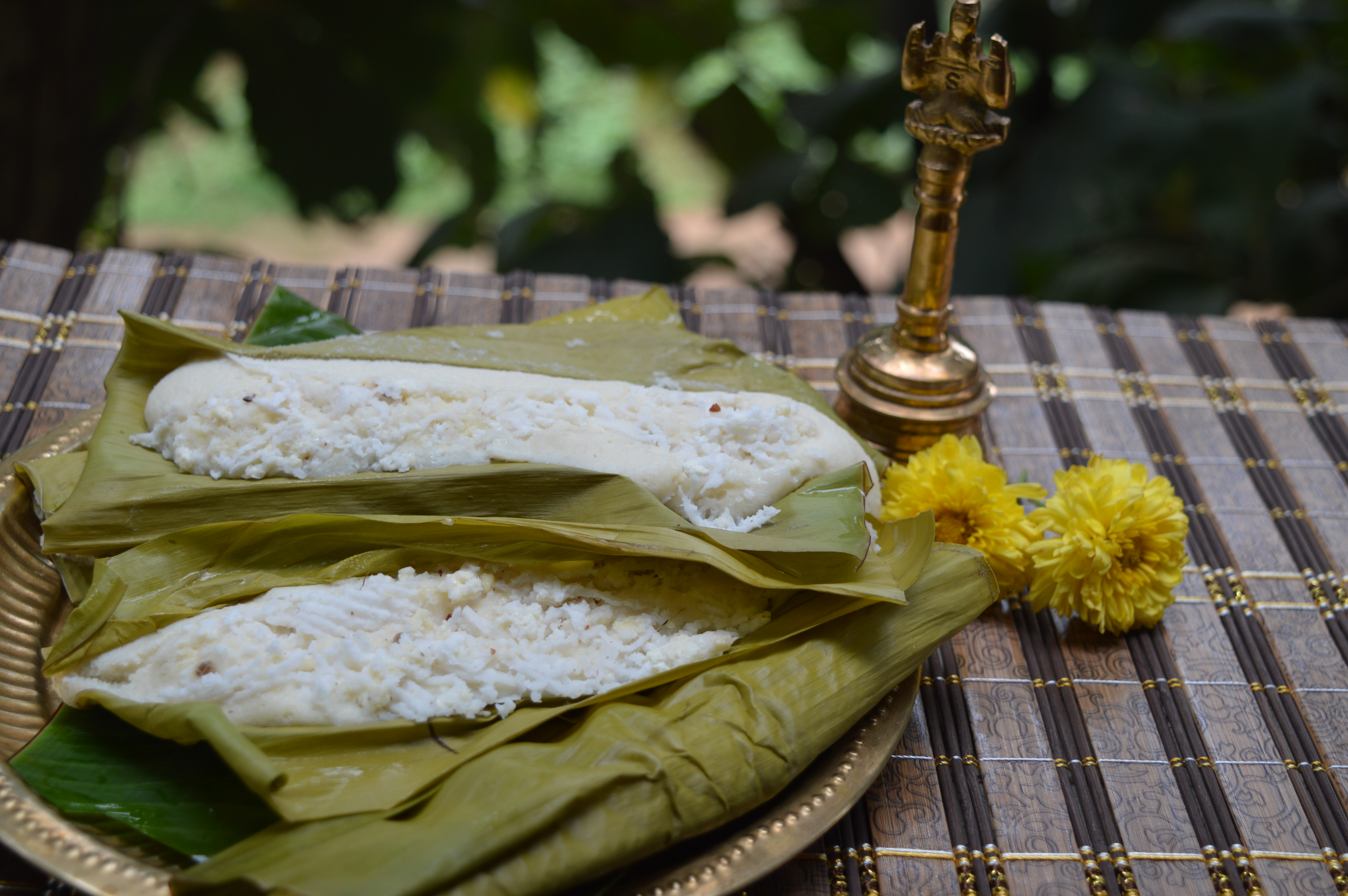
- Enduri pitha for Prathamashtami
- Alternative names: Haldi patra pitha
- Course: Dessert
- Place of origin: India
- Region or state: Odisha
- Main ingredients: Rice flour, turmeric leaves, black gram, coconut or chhena, jaggery, black pepper

Enḍuri piṭhā (Odia- ଏଣ୍ଡୁରି ପିଠା), also known as haḷadi patra piṭhā (Odia- ହଳଦି ପତ୍ର ପିଠା), is a variety of pitha made in the Indian state of Odisha, mostly in the northern, eastern and central regions. Ingredients are turmeric leaves, black gram, rice flour, coconut or chhena, jaggery, and black pepper. Enduri is mostly prepared during Prathamastami and Manabasa Gurubara. It is a light snack and has a laxative effect because of the turmeric leaves that are used to wrap the pitha. Traditionally, enduri were made by steaming in large earthen pots. Enduri is one of the many other pithas offered to Jagannath in the Jagannath Temple, Puri for sakala dhupa (breakfast).

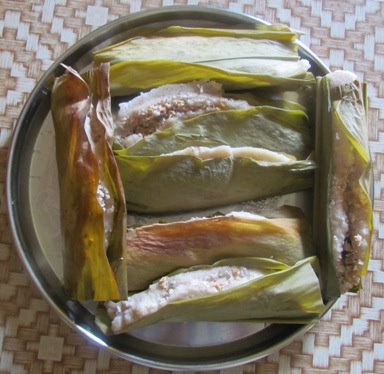
Enduri made during Prathamastami

== See also ==
- Muthia
- Odia cuisine
- Prathamastami
- List of steamed foods
