= Manabasa Gurubara =

Hindu festival

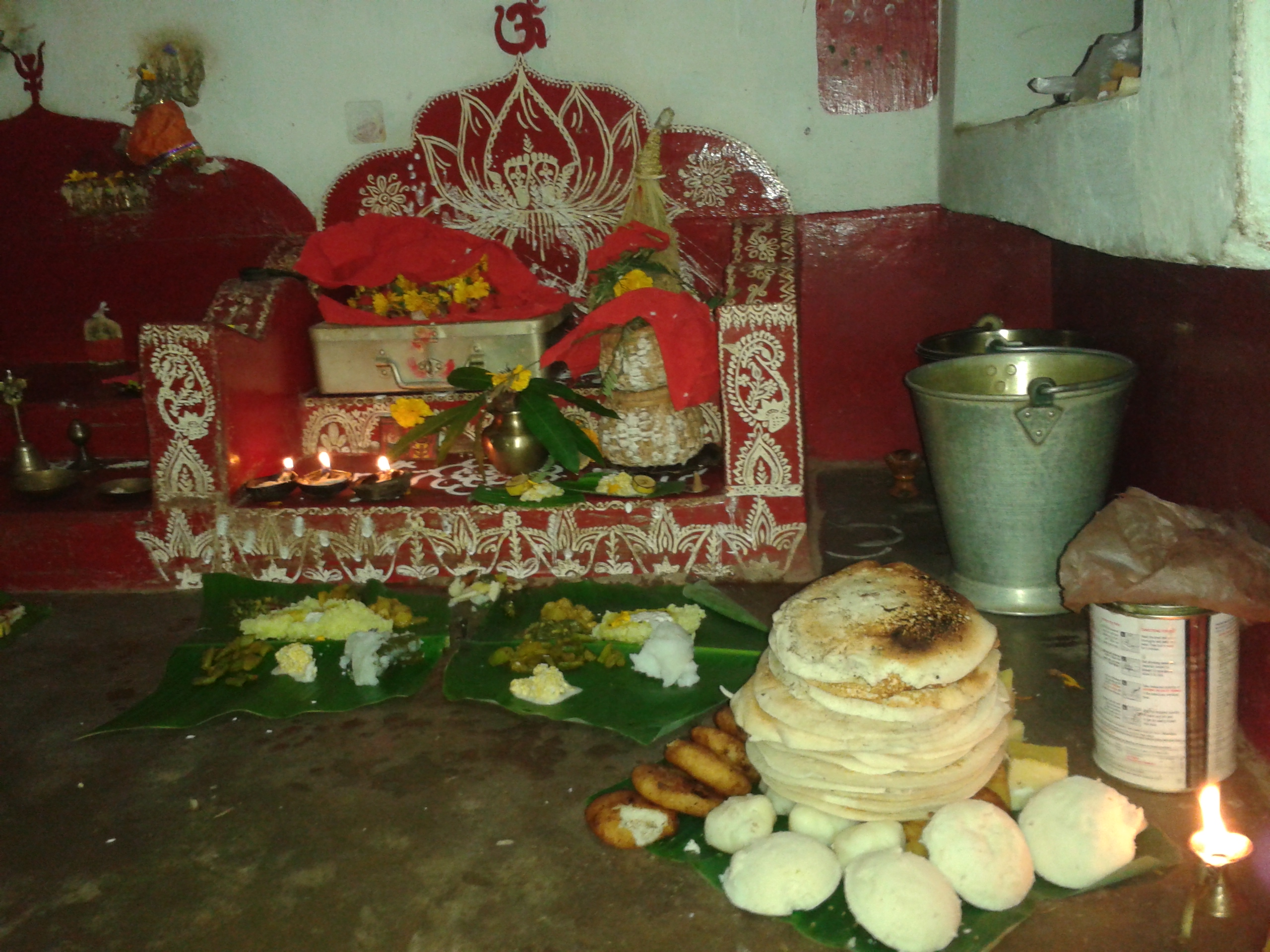
- Observed by: Odias
- Type: Hindu
- Observances: Lakshmi Vrata Puja
- Begins: 1st Thursday in the month of Margashira in Odia calendar
- Ends: Last Thursday in the month of Margashira in Odia calendar
- Duration: 1 month
- Frequency: Annual

Manabasa Gurubara (Odia: ମାଣବସା ଗୁରୁବାର, romanized: Mānabasā Gurubāra, lit. 'Margashira Thursday') is a festival celebrated by Odia Hindus in the East Indian state of Odisha. It is also celebrated by Odias living in Andhra Pradesh, Chhattisgarh, South Jharkhand and South West Bengal. This festival is held in honour of the goddess Lakshmi. Devotees believe that the goddess herself visits every household to remove sorrow and bless prosperity . It is held on every Thursday in the month of Margashira.

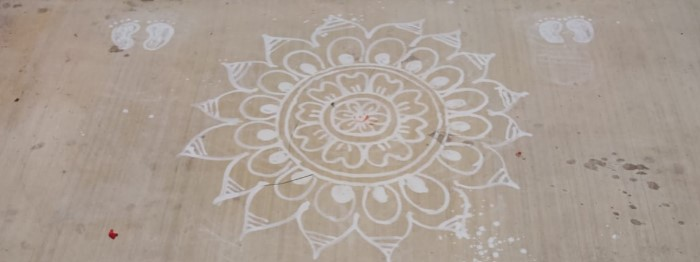

== Legend ==
This festival is rooted in a legend of Lakshmi as narrated in the Odia social commentary text Lakshmi Purana. According to the text, Lakshmi once left the shrine of the Jagannath Temple to visit the house of Shriya, an outcaste woman, pleased by the worship offered to her. When she returned, her consort, Jagannath, and brother-in-law Balarama, refused to allow her to enter the premises without performing a purification ceremony first. In response, Lakshmi left the temple and cursed her husband and brother-in-law to endure severe hardships without food, water, or shelter. The deities finally discovered the goddess at the house of an outcaste, and consented to eat the food prepared for them by the members. The goddess then returned to the deities to their shrine.

The Lakshmi Purana challenges the then-prevailing concept of untouchability and highlights the themes of feminism and female empowerment, portraying Lakshmi as a powerful force against male dominance. Inspired by this story, devotees perform puja for Lakshmi, celebrating her strength and advocating for social equality.

Adherents believe that Lakshmi is drawn to cleanliness, inspiring everyone to thoroughly clean their homes and adorn them with intricate jhoti chita designs. According to tradition, the goddess blesses the most beautifully decorated and harmonious home in the community—one radiating devotion, familial unity, and marital bliss—with health, happiness, and prosperity.
