= Prathamastami =

Festival held in Odisha

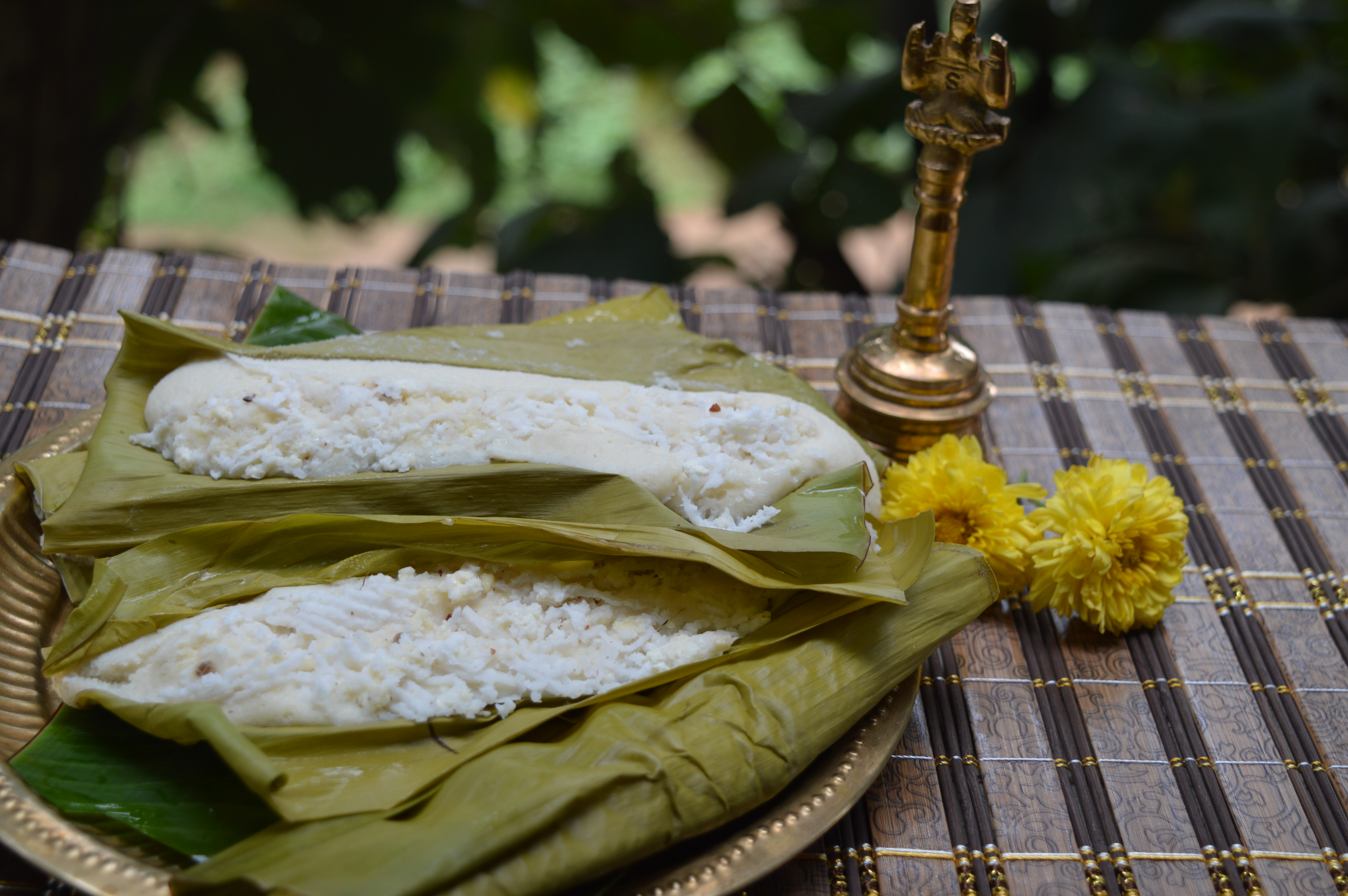
- Haladi Patra Pitha made during Prathamastami
- Also called: Bhairava Ashtami, Saubhagini Ashtami, Paap-nashini Ashtami
- Observed by: Odias
- Significance: Festival for the firstborn child of the family
- Observances: Pujas, rituals, Enduri Pitha
- Date: Margashira Krishna Ashtami, 8th Margashira of Odia calendar
- Frequency: annual

Prathamastami is an Odia ritual/festival held in Odisha praying for the life and prosperity of the eldest child of a family. The first child after completion of its one year is made to wear new clothes and offered a lighted lamp ovation by the senior female relatives followed by elaborate rituals during which the Mantras are recited. The celebration falls on the eighth day of moon waning phase—Ashtami—of the month of Margashira according to the Odia calendar, occurring on the eighth day after Kartika Purnima.

The ritual involves Aarati of the eldest child by mother and relatives in which the maternal uncle sends the items necessary for the rituals like new clothes, coconut, jaggery, newly harvested rice, black gram, turmeric leaves, coconut and other things(etc). Ganesha, Shashti devi and the family deity are worshipped. The main delicacy of the day is Enduri Pitha. This day is also known as Soubhagini Ashtami, Kaal Bhairav Ashtami and Paap-nashini Ashtami.
