= Filigree =

Form of intricate metalwork used in jewellery

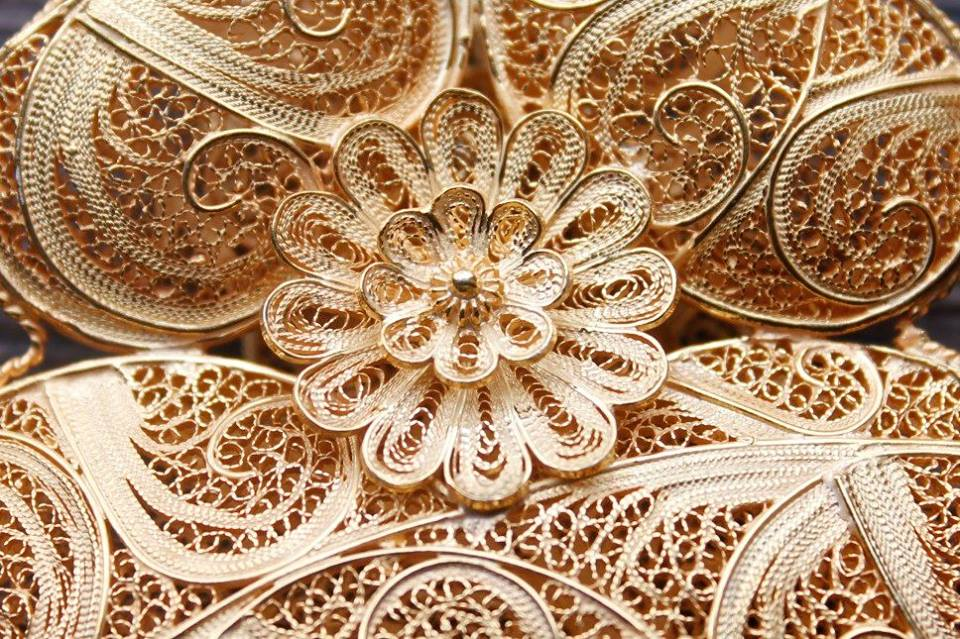
Gold filigree intricate work from Portugal

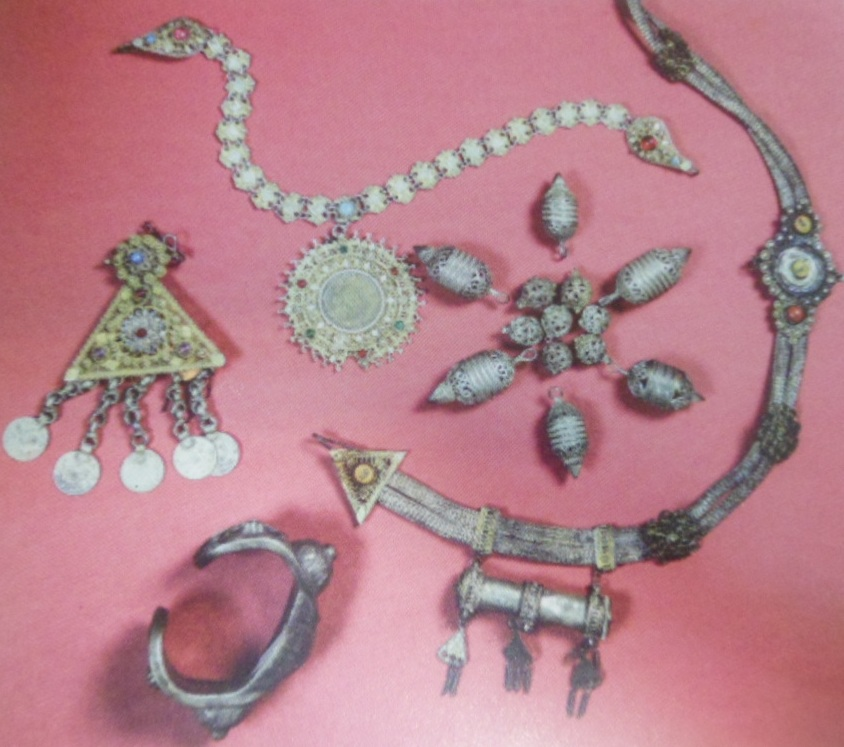
Albanian silver jewellery from 19th and 20th century

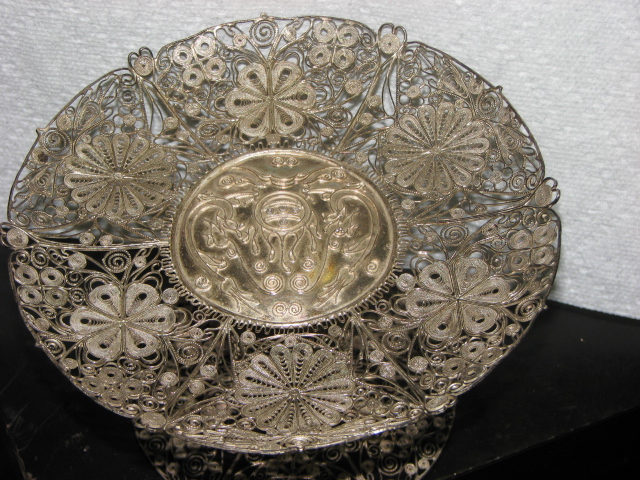
Sterling dish, filigree work

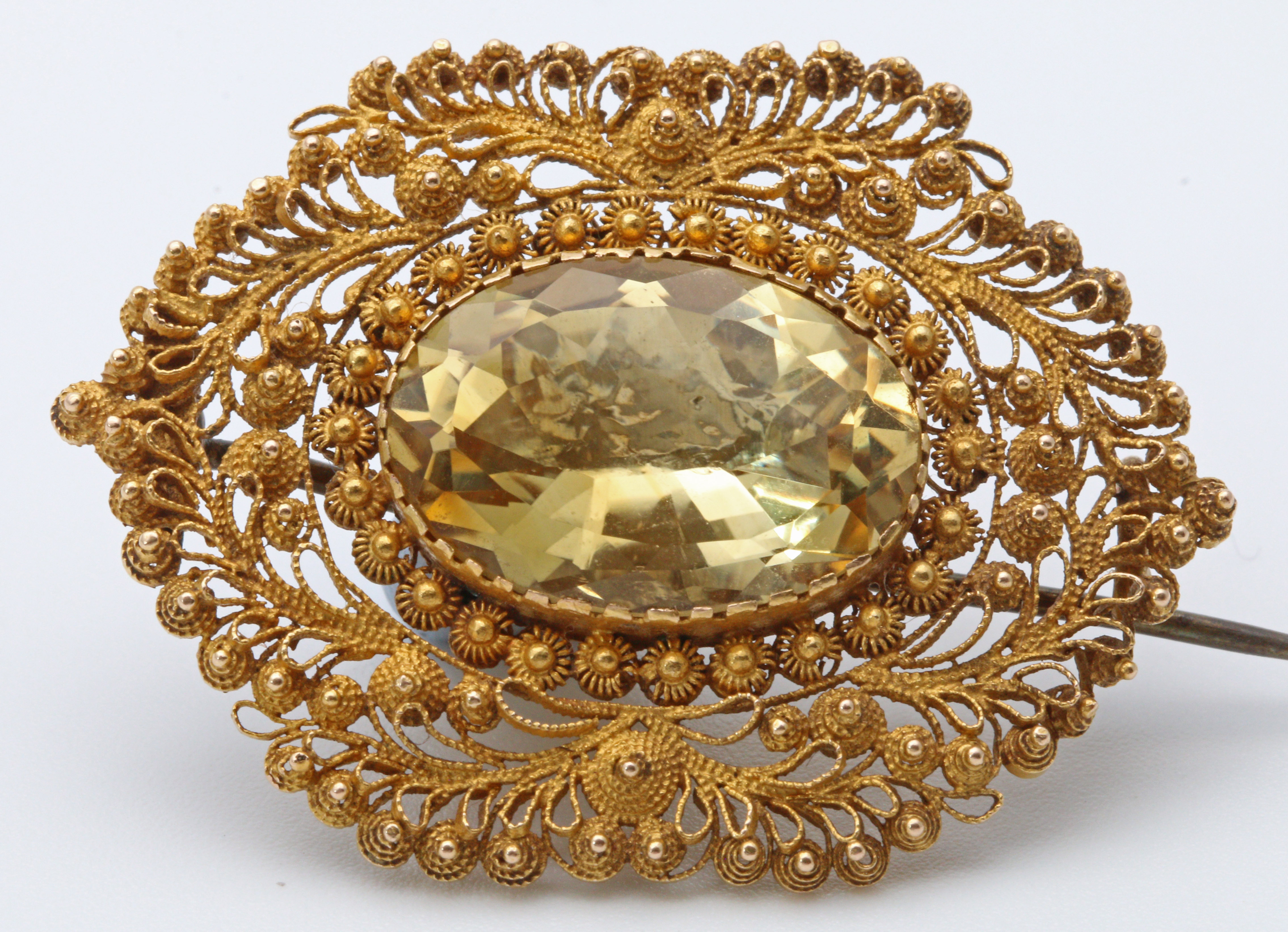
Citrine cannetille-work brooch

Filigree (also less commonly spelled filagree, and formerly written filigrann or filigrene) is a form of intricate metalwork used in jewellery and other small forms of metalwork.

In jewellery, it is usually of gold and silver, made with tiny beads or twisted threads, or both in combination, soldered together or to the surface of an object of the same metal and arranged in artistic motifs. It often suggests lace and remains popular in Indian and other Asian metalwork. It was popular as well in Italian, French and Portuguese metalwork from 1660 to the late 19th century. It should not be confused with ajoure jewellery work, the ajoure technique consisting of drilling holes in objects made of sheet metal.

The English word filigree is shortened from the earlier use of filigreen which derives from Latin filum meaning thread and granum grain, in the sense of small bead. The Latin words gave filigrana in Italian which itself became filigrane in 17th-century French.

== History ==
Though filigree has become a special branch of jewellery in modern times, it was historically part of the ordinary work of the jeweller. Indeed, all the jewellery of the Etruscans and Greeks (other than that intended for the grave, and therefore of an unsubstantial character) was made by soldering together and so building up the gold rather than by chiselling or engraving the material.

=== Ancient work ===
Archaeological finds in ancient Mesopotamia indicate that filigree was incorporated into jewellery since 3,000 BC. Specific to the city of Midyat in Mardin Province in upper Mesopotamia, a form of filigree using silver and gold wires, known as "telkari", was developed in the 15th century. Examples of historic artwork can be seen in the Midyat Filigree Museum. To this day, expert craftsmen in this region continue to produce fine pieces of telkari.

Egyptian jewellers employed wire, both to lay down on a background and to plait or otherwise arranged jour. But, with the exception of chains, it cannot be said that filigree work was much practiced by them. Their experience was in their cloisonné work and their molded ornaments. Many examples, however, remain of round plaited gold chains of fine wire, such as those that are still made by the filigree workers of India, and known as trichinopoly chains. From some of these are hung smaller chains of finer wire with minute fishes and other pendants fastened to them.

In ornaments derived from Phoenician sites, such as Cyprus and Sardinia, patterns of gold wire are laid down with great delicacy on a gold ground, but the art was advanced to its highest perfection in the Greek and Etruscan filigree of the 6th to the 3rd centuries BC. A number of earrings and other personal ornaments found in central Italy are preserved in the Louvre and in the British Museum. Almost all of them are made of filigree work. Some earrings are in the form of flowers of geometric design, bordered by one or more rims each made up of minute volutes of gold wire, and this kind of ornament is varied by slight differences in the way of disposing the number or arrangement of the volutes. But the feathers and petals of modern Italian filigree are not seen in these ancient designs. Instances occur, but only rarely, in which filigree devices in wire are self-supporting and not applied to metal plates.

The museum of the Hermitage at Saint Petersburg contains a large collection of Scythian jewellery from the tombs of the Crimea. Many bracelets and necklaces in that collection are made of twisted wire, some in as many as seven rows of plaiting, with clasps in the shape of heads of animals of beaten work. Others are strings of large beads of gold, decorated with volutes, knots and other patterns of wire soldered over the surfaces. In the British Museum a sceptre, probably that of a Greek priestess, is covered with plaited and netted gold wipe, finished with a sort of Corinthian capital and a boss of green glass.

=== Asia ===
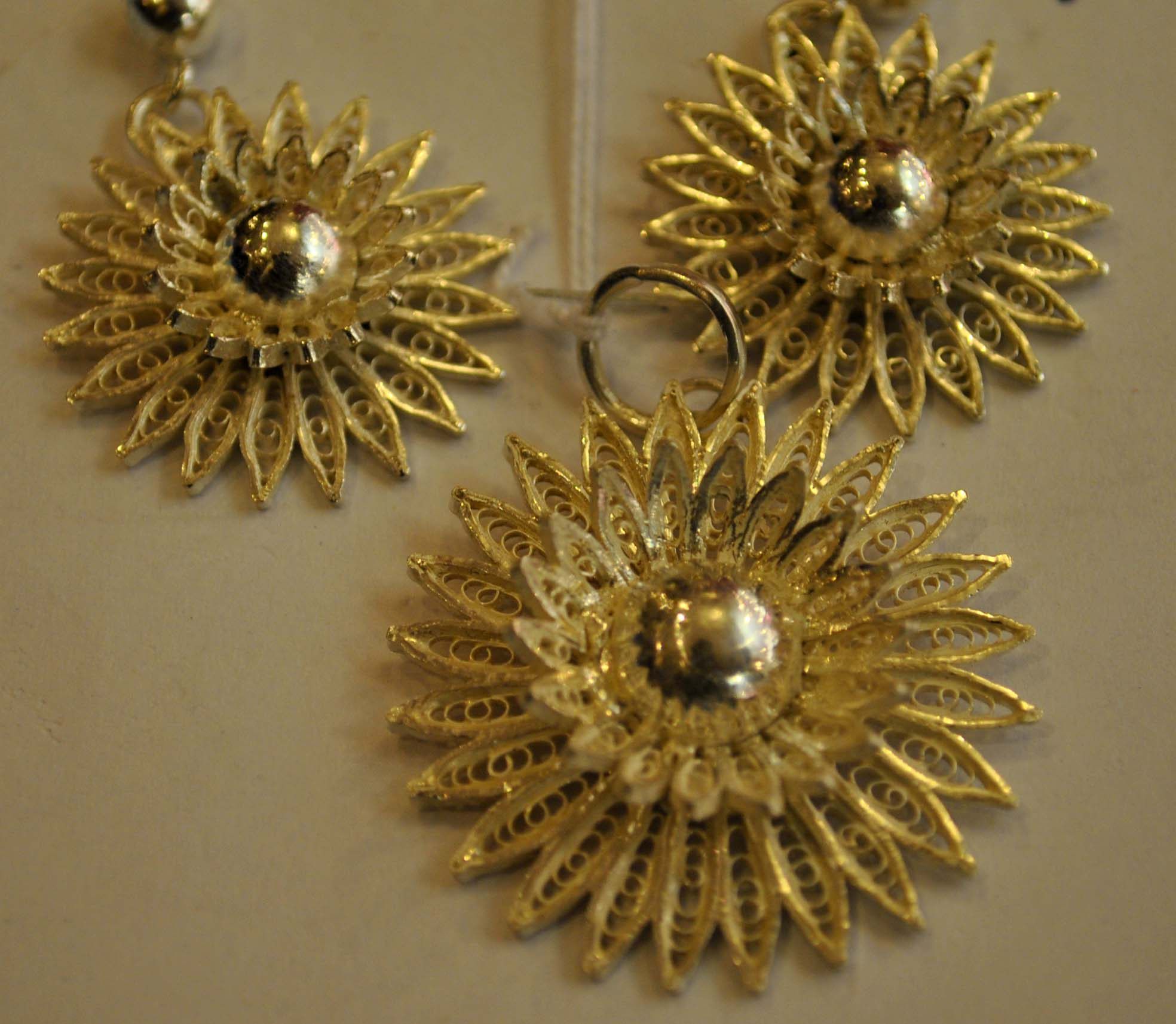
Tarakasi (silver filigree) pendant & ear rings, from Cuttack

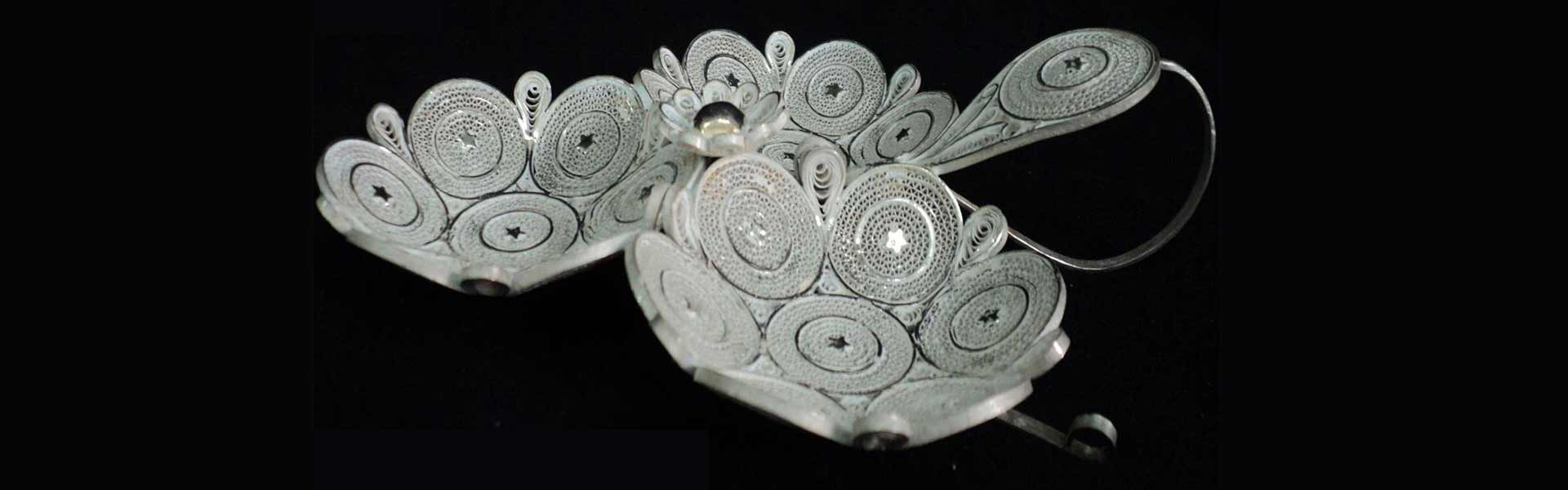
Silver filigree work of Cuttack

It is probable that in India, Iran (in Zanjan, this handicraft is called malileh) and various parts of central Asia filigree has been worked from the most remote period without any change in the designs. Whether the Asiatic jewellers were influenced by the Greeks who settled on that continent, or merely trained under traditions held in common with them, it is certain that the Indian filigree workers retain the same patterns as those of the ancient Greeks and work them in the same way, down to the present day. Wandering workmen are given so much gold, coined or rough, which is weighed, heated in a pan of charcoal, beaten into wire, and then worked in the courtyard or verandah of the employer's house according to the designs of the artist, who weighs the complete work on restoring it and is paid at a specified rate for his labour. Very fine grains or beads and spines of gold, scarcely thicker than coarse hair, projecting from plates of gold are methods of ornamentation still used.

Cuttack, of the eastern Indian state Odisha, features traditional filigree work Known as tarakasi in the Odia language, most filigree work revolves around images of deities, though due to lack of patronage and modern design ideas, it is a dying art. Also noted is silver filigree of Karimnagar in Telangana state.

=== Medieval Europe ===
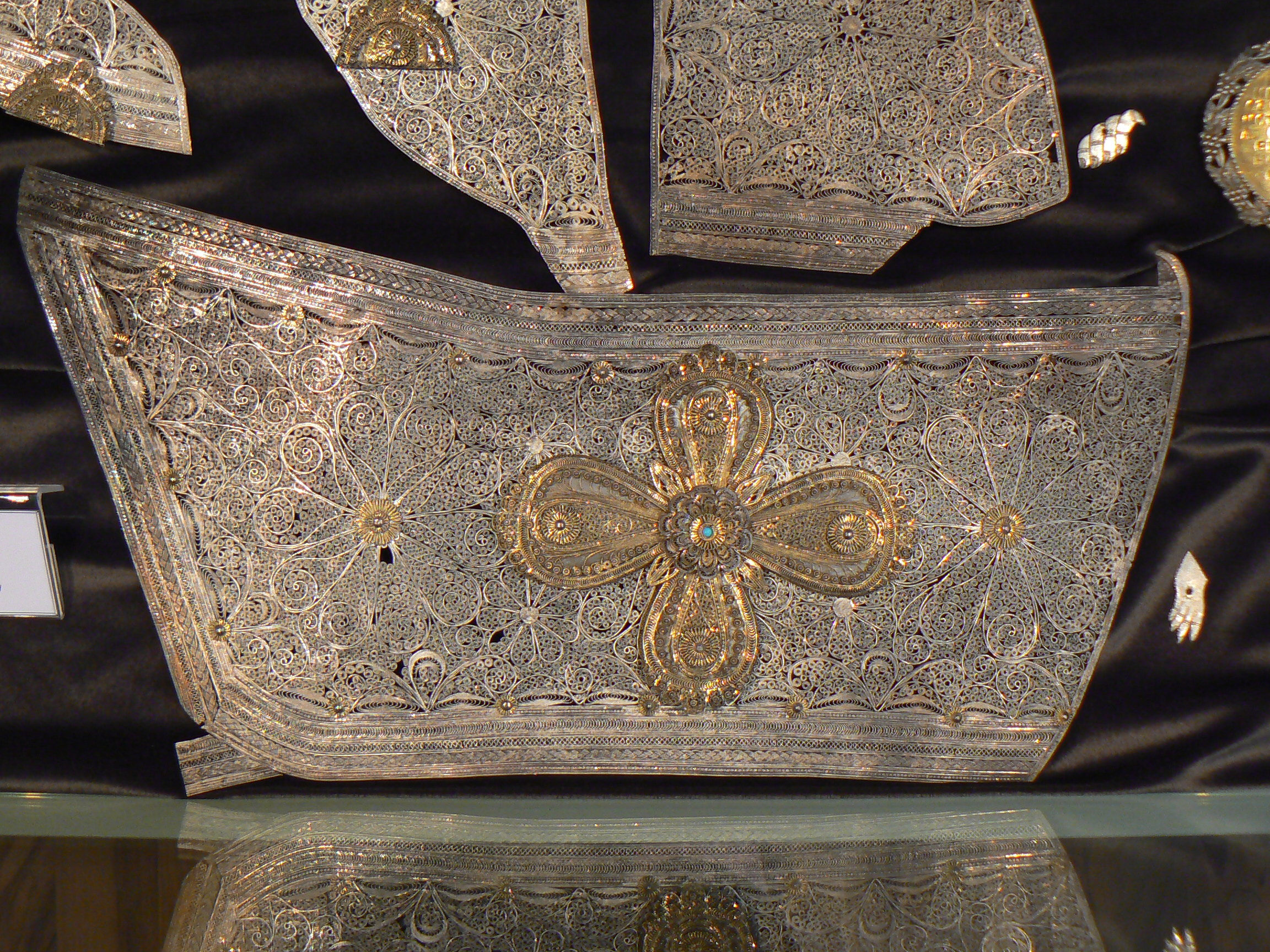
Silver filigree icon repousse cover; History Museum in Samokov, Bulgaria

Passing to later times, there are in many collections of medieval jewel work reliquaries, covers for Gospel books, etc., made either in Constantinople from the 6th to the 12th centuries, or in monasteries in Europe, in which studied and imitated Byzantine goldsmiths' work. These objects, besides being enriched with precious stones, polished, but not cut into facets, and with enamels, are often decorated with filigree. Large surfaces of gold are sometimes covered with scrolls of filigree soldered on, and corner pieces of the borders of book covers, or the panels of reliquaries, are frequently made up of complicated pieces of plaited work alternating with spaces encrusted with enamel. Byzantine filigree work occasionally has small stones set amongst the curves or knots. Examples of such decoration can be seen in the Victoria and Albert, and British Museums. Examples include the Cross of Lothair in Aachen.

In the north of Europe, the Saxons, Britons and Celts were from an early period skillful in several kinds of goldsmiths' work. Admirable examples of filigree patterns laid down in wire on gold, from Anglo-Saxon tombs, may be seen in the British Museum, notably a brooch from Dover, and a sword-hilt from Cumberland. The Staffordshire Hoard of Anglo-Saxon gold and silver (estimated 700 CE) discovered in a field in Staffordshire, England, on 5 July 2009 contains numerous examples of very fine filigree described by archaeologist Kevin Leahy as "incredible".

Irish filigree work of the Insular period is more thoughtful in design and more extremely varied in pattern. The Royal Irish Academy in Dublin contains a number of reliquaries and personal jewels, of which filigree is the general and most remarkable ornament. The Tara Brooch, in the National Museum of Ireland, has been copied and imitated numerous since the mid 19th century; Queen Victoria had a copy made in the late 1840s. Instead of fine curls or volutes of gold thread, Irish filigree is varied by numerous designs by which one thread can be traced through curious knots and complications, which, disposed over large surfaces, balance one another, but always with special varieties and arrangements difficult to trace with the eye. The long thread appears and disappears without breach of continuity, the two ends generally worked into the head and the tail of a serpent or a monster.

The reliquary containing the "Bell of Saint Patrick" is covered with knotted work in many varieties. A two-handled chalice, called the "Ardagh Chalice" found near Limerick in 1868, is ornamented with work of this kind of extraordinary fineness. Twelve plaques on a band round the body of the vase, plaques on each handle and round the foot of the vase have a series of different designs of characteristic patterns, in fine filigree wire work wrought on the front of the repoussé ground.

Much of the medieval jewel work all over Europe down to the 15th century, on reliquaries, crosses, croziers, and other ecclesiastical goldsmiths' work, is set off with bosses and borders of filigree. Filigree work in silver was practised by the Moors of Spain during the Middle Ages with great skill, and was introduced by them and established all over the Iberian Peninsula, hence it was carried to the Spanish colonies in America.

The manufacture spread over the Balearic Islands, and among the populations that border the Mediterranean. It is still made all over Italy, and in Portugal, Malta, North Macedonia, Albania, the Ionian Islands and many other parts of Greece. That of the Greeks is sometimes on a large scale, with several thicknesses of wires alternating with larger and smaller bosses and beads, sometimes set with turquoises, and mounted on convex plates, making rich ornamental headpieces, belts, and breast ornaments. Filigree silver buttons of wire-work and small bosses are worn by the peasants in most of the countries that produce this kind of jewellery.

Silver filigree brooches and buttons are also made in Denmark, Norway, and Sweden. Little chains and pendants are added to much of this northern work.

==== Iberian Peninsula ====
The oldest filigree pieces discovered in the Iberian Peninsula date back to 2000–2500 BC, but its origin is not clear. These pieces possibly belonged to merchants and navigators originally from the Middle East and are not thought to have been produced in the region at that time. Filigree began to be produced in Portugal in the 8th century with the arrival of Arab migrants, who brought new patterns with them. With time, the peninsula began to produce different filigree patterns, but while in Spain the filigree jewellery-making tradition became less relevant, in Portugal it was perfected. After the 18th century, Portuguese Filigree already had its own distinctive imagery, motifs and shapes. Filigree from the 17th and 18th centuries became famous for their extraordinary complexity. Gold and silver filigree jewellery of delicate and artistic design is still made in considerable quantities throughout the country, particularly filigree hearts, which are iconic symbols of Portuguese jewellery-making.

=== Africa ===
Filigree work was brought to Great Britain from Abyssinia after the Battle of Magdala: armguards, slippers, and cups, some of which are now in the Victoria and Albert Museum. They are made of thin plates of silver, over which the wirework is soldered. The filigree is subdivided by narrow borders of simple pattern, and the intervening spaces are made up of many patterns, some with grains set at intervals.

== Methods of fabrication and uses ==
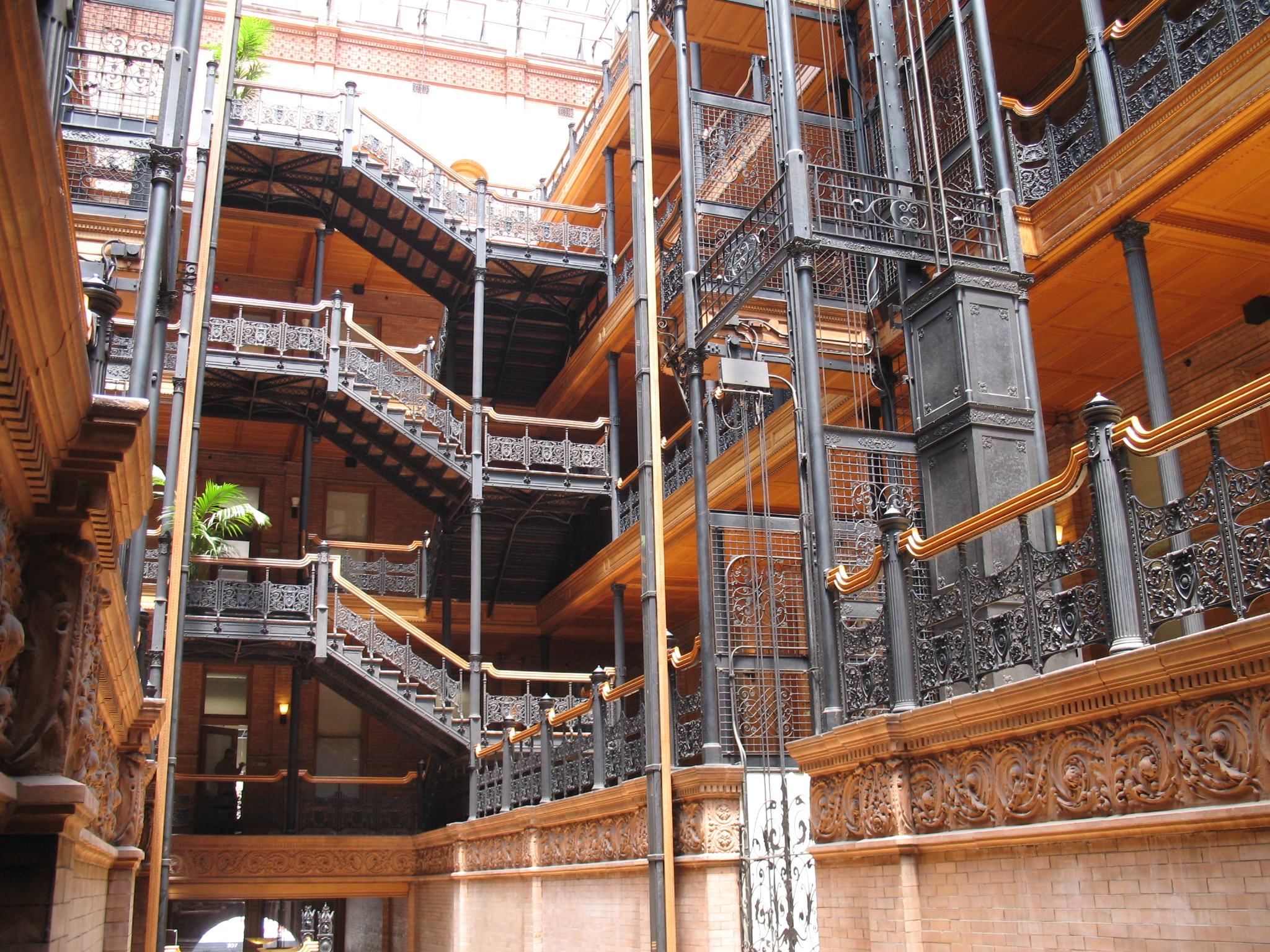
Cast iron balustrades of the type sometimes called "filigree", in the central atrium of the Bradbury Building in Los Angeles

Filigree can be made as openwork or with a metal backing. In openwork filigree, connected metal wires are soldered together without a solid base, creating a delicate, lace-like structure that supports itself. Metal-supported, or ground-supported, filigree uses a thin metal sheet as a backing, with decorative wires soldered onto the surface for added strength and design complexity. Some pieces combine both methods and may also include gemstones for additional ornamentation.

The art may be said to consist in curling, twisting and plaiting fine pliable threads of metal, and uniting them at their points of contact with each other, and with the ground, by means of flux such as borax, by the help of the blowpipe. When granulated motifs are desired, small beads are made traditionally by using precious metal wire or fine sheet to start with, which is cut up in small pieces mixed with flux and placed in the small holes of a pitted block of charcoal (or any other suitable refractory material) and are then melted with a blowpipe (or today with a blowtorch), after which the bits of wire curl up and take a natural spherical like shape to end up in minuscule grains which slightly differ one from the other. Small grains or beads of the same metals are often set in the eyes of volutes, on the junctions, or at intervals at which they will set off the wirework effectively. The more delicate work is generally protected by framework of stouter wire.

Brooches, crosses, earrings, buttons and other personal ornaments of modern filigree are generally surrounded and subdivided by bands of square or flat metal, giving consistency to the filling up, which would not otherwise keep its proper shape.

== Modern filigree ==
=== Technological innovations ===
Technologies like CAD and 3D printing have enabled jewelers to visualize the filigree and fabricate complex patterns. With CAD, you can create high detailed 3D models of the final piece, its measurements and visual appearance. Once the design is completed in CAD, it's then sent to a 3D printer which creates a physical model with wax or resin.

Laser cutting and engraving are other sets of innovations that offer precision and minimal material waste. Laser cutters use a beam of light to cut through sheets of metal making the result very precise, hence ideal for creating matching pieces or symmetrical designs. Engraving, on the other hand works by vaporizing metal surface to create shallow, perfect lines and textures. It is usually used to add fine decorative details, names, or motifs.

== Metaphorical uses ==
"Filigree" has been used metaphorically as a term for intricate ornamental designs in a number of other contexts, including larger-scale metalwork such as wrought iron or cast iron pieces such as railings and balustrades. In Polish, the term "filigranowy" or "filigranowa" (lit. "filigree") is used to describe people with a petite body.

== See also ==
- Granulation
- Guilloché
- Torc
