= Ajouré =

Metalworking technique

Ajouré or à jour (French for "to the day," meaning open to the daylight) is an openwork metalworking technique similar to filigree, which leaves open spaces in the worked metal. Unlike filigree, the holes are usually sawed or pierced through solid metal rather than being incorporated during the process of construction. This technique also differs from plique-à-jour enamelling in that the open spaces are not filled with enamel, but left open. The result is reminiscent of the style of lace also known as à jour or cutwork.

À jour work is often used in jewellery making to enhance gemstones by letting light shine through the back of the stone. This stonesetting technique became popular around 1800 A.D. and is commonly seen in Art Deco pieces.

== See also ==
- Openwork
- Plique-à-jour
