= Dhanu jatra =

Annual open air theatrical performance in Odisha, India

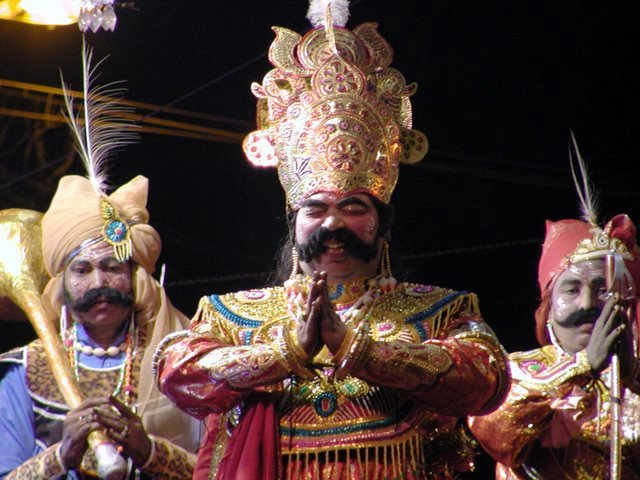
- Kansa of Bargarh Dhanu Jatra
- Also called: World's largest open air theatre
- Observed by: Residents of Bargarh and Ambapali with other non-local visitors
- Begins: Pausha Shukla Panchami
- Ends: Pausha Purnima
- Related to: Sri Krishna, Kansa

Dhanu Jatra or Dhanu Yatra is an annual drama-based open air theatrical performance celebrated in Bargarh, Odisha. Spread across a 8 km radius area around the Bargarh municipality, it is the world's largest open air theater, one that finds a mention in the Guinness Book of World Records. It is based on mythological story of Krishna (locally known as Krushna), and his demon uncle Kansa. Originating in Bargarh, in the present day play, the enactments of the play are being performed in many other places in Western Odisha. The major one of these is the original one at Bargarh. It is about the episode of Krishna and Balaram's visit to Mathura to witness the Dhanu ceremony organized by their (maternal) uncle Kansa. The plays start with the dethroning of emperor Ugrasena by the angry prince Kansa, over the marriage of his sister Debaki with Basudeba, and ends with death of Kansa, and restoring Ugrasen back to become the king. There is no written script used in these enactments. During this festival Kansa can punish people with penalty for their mistakes. Biju Patnaik, the former Chief Minister of Odisha was fined once along with his ministers. The department of Culture of the Government of India has accorded National Festival status to Dhanu Yatra in November 2014.

== History ==
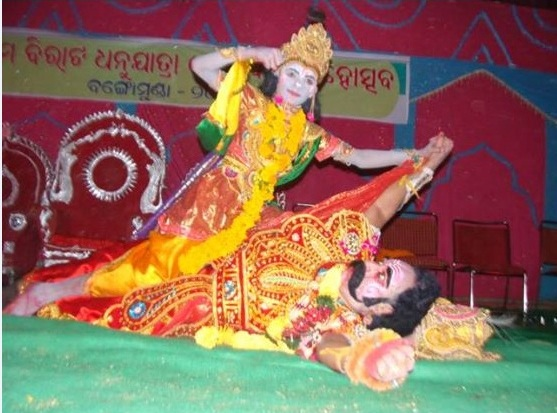
Kansa being killed by Krishna in the Dhanu jatra at Bangomunda, Balangir district, Odisha.

It is said by some old people that as a way to celebrate the freedom, of newly formed independent India after the British rulers, the labor class workers started this festival. The death of Kansa symbolised the end of colonial rules.

== Venues ==
The main municipality area turns into the historical town of Mathura Nagari, river Jeera turns into Yamuna, Ambapaali village (now a ward - part of Bargarh municipality) becomes Gopapura. A Pond by the side of Jeera river in Ambapali becomes the Kalindi Lake of the mythology. Since 2005, Nishamani School Ground has been used as the Rangamahal - Cultural stage of the festival.

There are many other towns and villages of western Odisha, where this drama enactment is done in recent years, following the success and popularity of the Bargarh stage. The notable places are village Chicholi of Ambabhona block is considered to be the second most famous in that area, apart from this Thuaapaali, Remanda are also notable.

=== Mathura ===
Two stages in the town. The daily vegetable market inside the heart of the town becomes the main stage of the festival. Second stage is set up in Nishamani High School field near Kalimandir. A temporary stage is built up using bamboo, cloth and other decorating materials. The cement concrete roof of market shops around works as main platform. Whereas in Nishamani field, there is ample space in the ground to enjoy the show. Cultural troops, perform there in presence of King Kansa, invited guests and eager audience ranging from children to old people.

There is the historical place of starting point, at the rear area of the daily market, where the holy mast is erected a few days before the actual festival begins. Historically this place has been used by "Sanchaar" dance form performers. It is declining and going extinct as a form of dance. Only handful old performers of this dance form are left, who still come every year to perform. This dance goes on throughout the night to keep the visitors of the villages engaged with entertainment, questions and answers.

=== Gopapura ===
Nearby village Ambapaali is rendered as Gopapura, during the festival. Villagers paint their houses to the themes of the mythology, hand drawings on walls showing various stories of Krishna. Wall writing of poetic stanzas are quite common on almost all walls of the village.

=== Yamuna River ===
Jeera river, flowing on West side to the main town, is transformed into river Yamuna for these 10 days. The river is used in the drama in 3 days of the play:

1. When Krishna is born and Vasudeva goes to leave Krishna, his son at king Nanda's place, for the safety from the killer hands of Kansa
2. During Raas Leela of Krishna with Gopis along the banks of the river (Gopapura - Ambapaali)
3. When minister Akrura goes and brings Krishna Balaram Brother duos to show them Dhanu jatra at Mathura (Bargarh) city.

=== Ashramas ===
Gobindpaali:

== Year-wise prime actors ==
2009–2015 Dhanuyatra - Kansa- Hrushikes bhoi

Makeup artist Ghasiram Sahu of Bargarh, Odisha, actively associated with this festival since 1951 without a break, died at the age of 84 years on 31 July 2015. He is credited for giving unique tyrant look to Kanssa, the principal actor of this play.

== Events that require a special mention ==
Known as the world's biggest open-air theatre, it is held at bargarh since 1947.

== See also ==
- Festivals of Odisha
- Bargarh
