= Tarakasi =

Silver filigree work from Cuttack, India

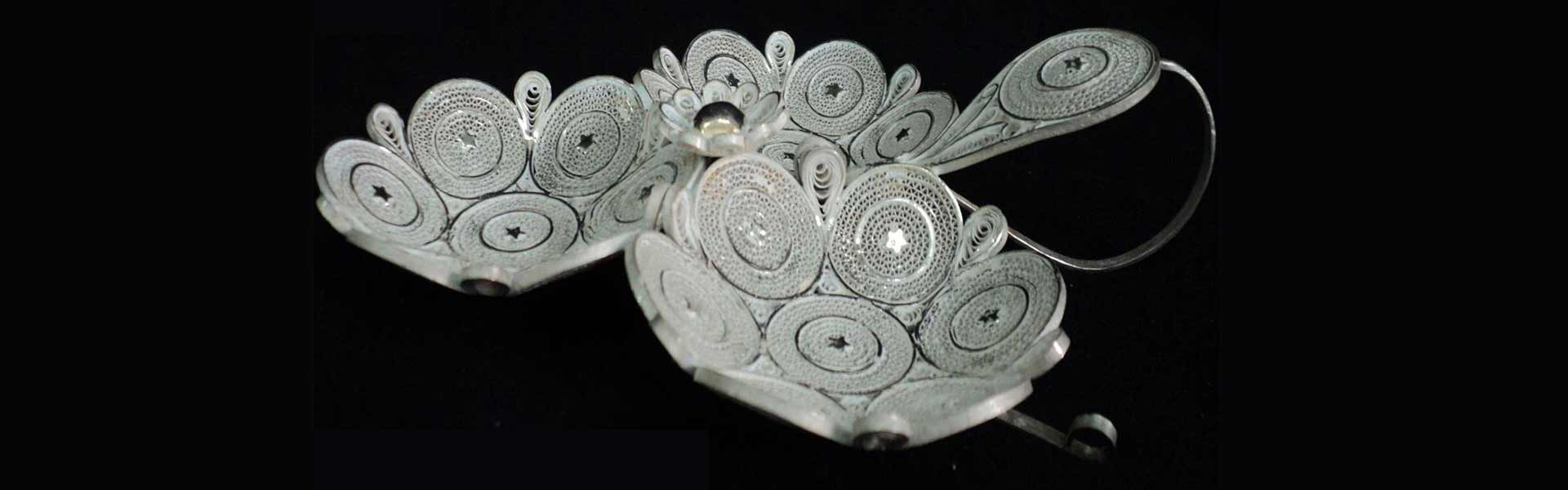
Tarakashi work of Cuttack

Tarakasi (Odia: ତାରକସି, romanized: tārakasi, Hindi: तारकशी, romanized: tārkaśī, Urdu: تَارْکَشِی, romanized: tārkaśī, Persian: تَارْکَشِی, romanized: tārkašī) is a type of silver filigree work from Cuttack, a city in Odisha in the eastern part of India.

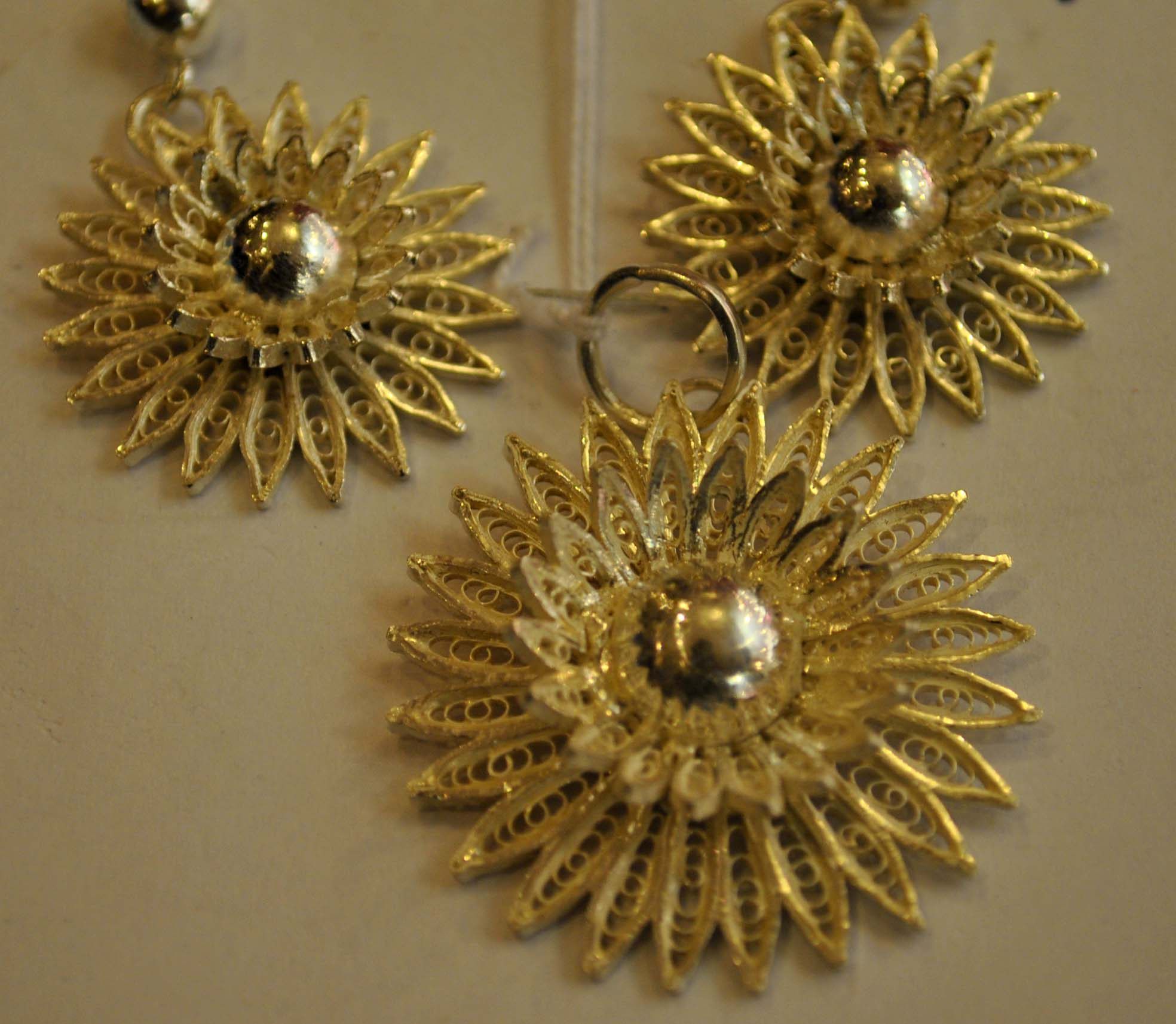
Cuttack Tarkasi (silver filigree) pendant and ear rings

== Origin ==
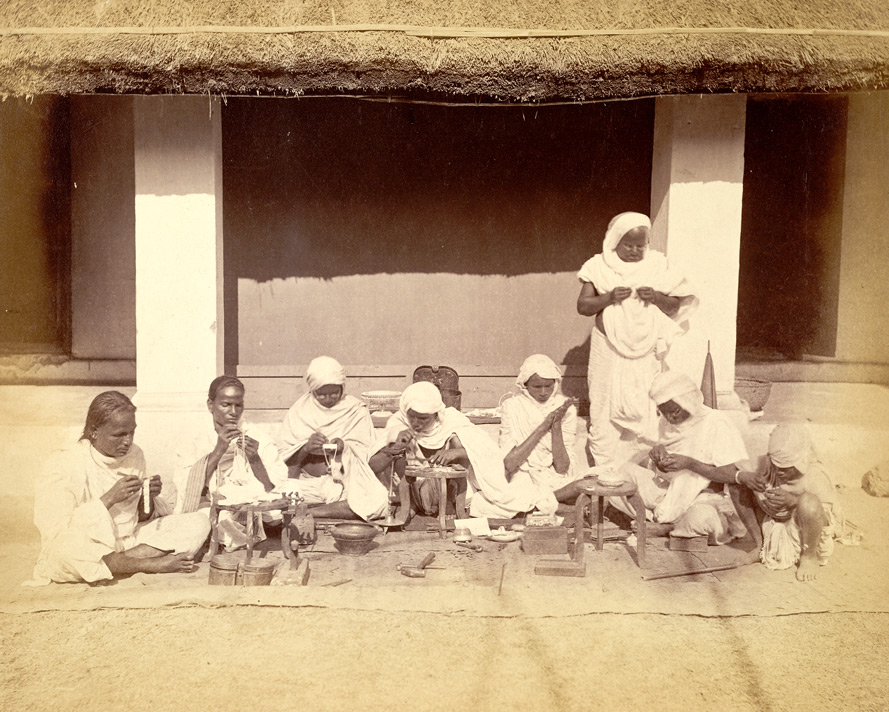
Circa 1873 Archaeological Survey of India photo of tarakasi crafters at work in Cuttack

This highly skilled art form is more than 500 years old and is traditionally done by local artisans on the eastern shores of Odisha. Presently, the silver filigree workers are largely from the district of Cuttack, where the art flourishes.

== Technique ==
The filigree artists work with an alloy of 90% or more pure silver. First, the lump of silver is placed into a small clay pot and the two are put into a bucket full of hot coals. The temperature is regulated by a hand-operated crank that operates a bellows.

The melting process takes about ten minutes, and then the silver is poured into a small, rod-like mould and cooled by submerging the rod in water. It is then placed into a machine that will press the rod into a long, thin wire. This tedious and physically demanding process had been done traditionally by hand and took two men to turn the crank.

Once the silver is pressed into a flat, workable wire, the wire itself can first be hand-carved with intricate designs or immediately smouldered by a small kerosene fire, with one artist directing the small flame with a tube held in his mouth, into which he can blow. This process makes it easier for the artisan to mould the wire into the desired frame for the piece before it is cooled. Next, the wires are strung together and twisted and shaped into a design by the artist's precise fingers. Soldering is done by placing the piece into a mixture of borax powder and water, sprinkling soldering powder on it, and then placing it once again under the small flame. This ensures that the details of the design will stay intact.

Once this is done, the artist will take the warm piece and shape it into an ornament. Techniques such as granulation, snow glazing and casting are used in innovative ways to heighten the effect. Artisan Jagdish Mishra, speaking of the techniques employed, says, "The tastes of the customers keep changing and artists must be up to date to keep up with emerging trends". Such new methods and experimentation are increasingly being employed to produce highly polished and refined artefacts in keeping with the demands of customers. Platinum polishing is done to give a more lasting shine, whereas fusion of silver and brass or other materials is done to create interesting effects.

== Tradition ==
Forms of animals, birds, flowers and even miniature handbags and other souvenirs are made in Tarakasi work. The Konark Chakra and temple are great favourites as mementoes. Scenes from the Mahabharata, in particular the still from the Bhagavad Gita depicting the chariot of Arjuna driven by Lord Krishna are quite popular. Over the years, various famous monuments like the Taj Mahal, Eiffel Tower, and others have been made, garnering accolades from admirers of fine arts.

The filigree jewellery is particularly rich in patterns. In Odisha, the stress is on arm jewellery, necklaces, toe rings and especially anklets, which are a great favourite. They are considered auspicious as well. Intricate anklets, combining the use of semi-precious stones, are greatly preferred.

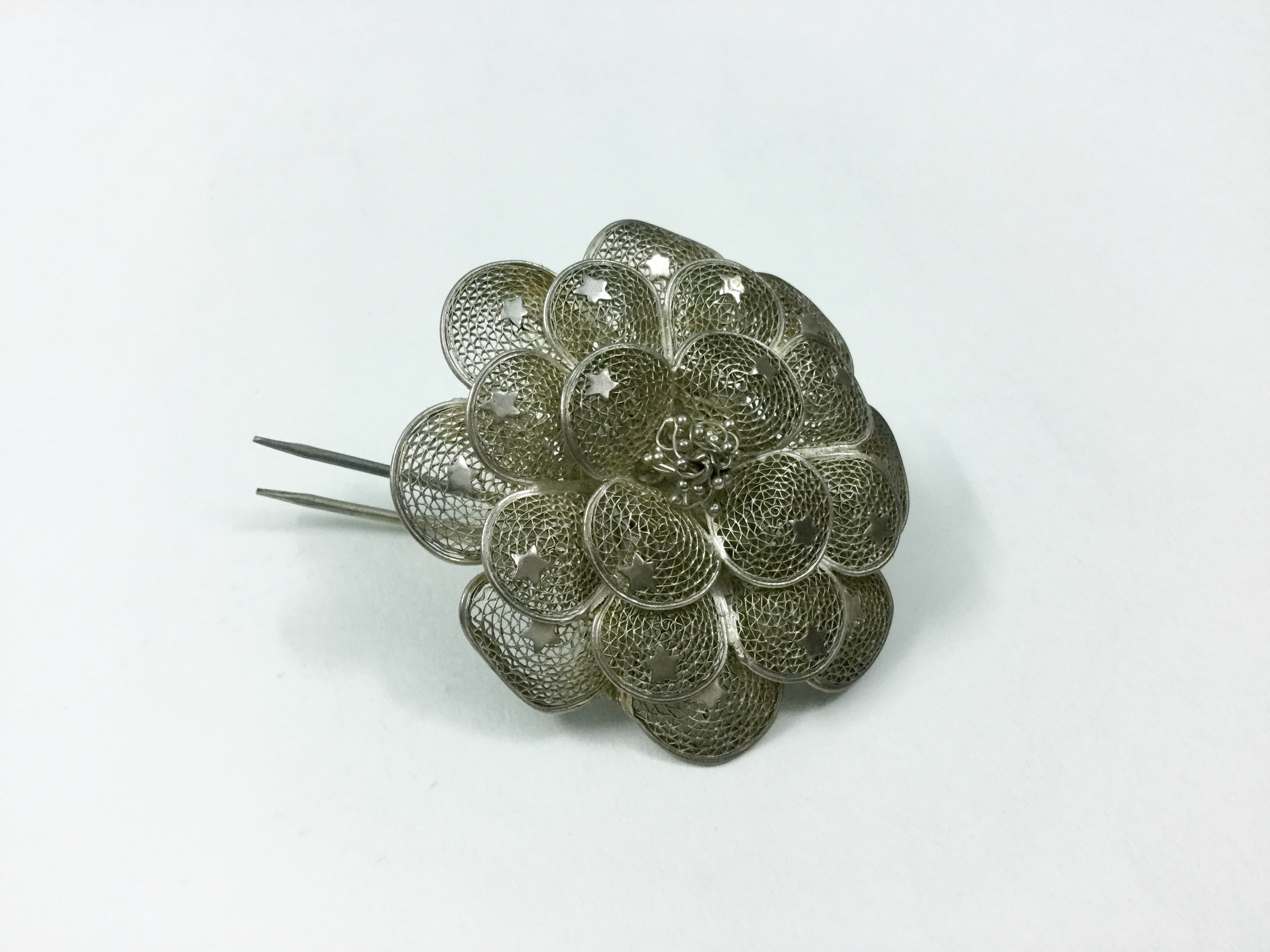
The Bela-Kanta, a traditional ornament

Vermilion boxes, brooches, pendants, earrings and hairpins are in great demand. A vermilion box is a must in any Odia marriage, but this tradition is dying out. Waist bands made from Tarakasi work were used traditionally in marriage. Oriya marriages are incomplete without Tarakasi anklets and toe rings.

=== Odissi ===
The jewellery worn in Odissi, one of the Indian classical dances originating from Odisha, is made from Tarakasi work. These ornaments adorn the head, ear, neck, hands, fingers and waist of the dancer. The ornaments include a choker, padaka-tilaka (a long necklace), bahichudi or tayila (armlets), kankana (bracelets), a mekhala (belt), anklets, bells, kapa (earrings) and a sinthi (ornament work on the hair and forehead). These ornaments are embellished with natural, uncut stones lined with silver and gold.

=== Durga puja ===
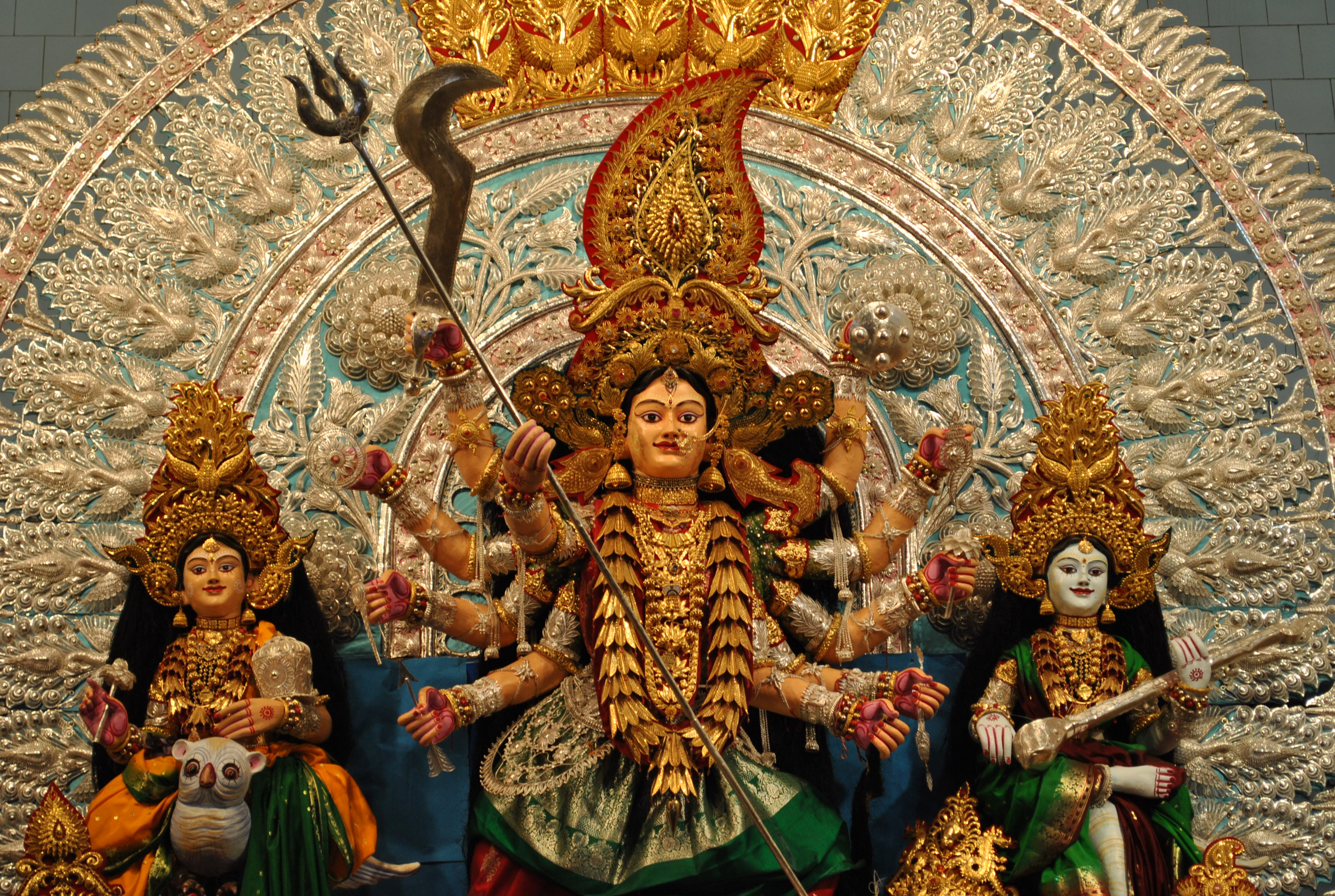
Silver filigree work at Chaudhury Bazar Durga Puja pandal Cuttack

The introduction of the Sharadiya Utsav tradition in the city dates back to the visit of Chaitanya Mahaprabhu, a Hindu saint, in the 16th century, when the consecration of the idol of Durga by using the mask pattern was conducted in his presence at Binod Behari Devi Mandap.

Every year, during Durga Puja in Cuttack, Tarakasi jewellery is used at many pandals to embellish the idols of Durga. One of the most famous idols is the one at Chandni Chowk, where the entire crown and accessories of Durga are made of silver, popularly known as Chaandi Medha. Other pandals using Tarakasi are Chauliaganj, Choudhury Bazar, Khan Nagar, Banka Bazar, Dargaah Bazaar, Balu Bazar, etc.

Every year, more than 150 filigree artisans are engaged in making backdrop and ornament designs. The style was introduced at the Choudhury Bazaar puja pandal with a 250 kg (550 lb) chandi medha in 1956. Following suit, Sheikh Bazaar puja mandap installed a 350 kg (770 lb) chandi medha in 1991. In 2004, the Ranihat puja committee joined the elite group with a 483 kg (1,065 lb) of silver filigree backdrop, jewellery and weaponry. In the following year, Haripur-Dolamundai puja committee superseded Ranihat when it installed 500 kg (1,100 lb) silver filigree. In 2006, the Sheikh Bazaar committee remodelled a new backdrop using 450 kg (990 lb) of silver. Chandini Chowk, Sheikh Bazaar, Alisha Bazaar, Chauliaganj, Badambadi, Ranihat, Haripur-Dolamundai and Balu Bazaar-Binod Behari puja committees are vouching for the filigree work. There is a competition to notch the best show every year among all puja committees in Cuttack.
