= Sitalsasthi =

Religious festival in India

Coordinates: 21.464468°N 83.969199°E

Sitala Sasthi ଶୀତଳ ଷଷ୍ଠୀ
- Observed by: Hindu
- Significance: Wedding of Shiva and Parvati
- Date: Jyeshta Shukla Shashti

Shitalasasthi, also known as Sital Sasthi, is a Hindu festival that celebrates the wedding of the deities Shiva and Parvati. It is primarily observed by the Utkal Brahmins (commonly referred to as Odia Brahmins) and Aranyaka Brahmins (also known as Jhadua Brahmins). The festival has its origins in Sambalpur, Odisha. It is believed to have begun around 400 years ago when the King of Sambalpur invited Utkal Srotriya Vaidika Brahmins from the Brahmin sasana villages of Puri district. The Brahmin community of Nandapada, considered one of the oldest groups, initiated the Sitalsasti Utsav.

Shitalasasthi is observed annually towards the end of the summer season, on the sixth day of the bright fortnight of the month of Jyestha. The purpose of the festival is to invoke the rain gods, providing relief from the summer heat.

== Legend ==
Shitalasasthi is celebrated to commemorate the marriage of Parvati and Shiva, as described in the Shiva Purana. According to the legend, when the demon Tarakasura was wreaking havoc across the three realms—Svarga (heaven), Martya (earth), and Patala (underworld)—the gods approached Vishnu for a solution. Vishnu was initially unable to help, as Brahma had granted a boon to Tarakasura, stating that only the son of Shiva could kill him.

Tarakasura, knowing that Shiva had withdrawn from the world after the death of his first wife, Sati, and was living a life of austerity in the wilderness, believed that Shiva would never father a child. Moreover, Shiva was deeply immersed in meditation. To resolve this, Vishnu advised the gods to seek Shakti's intervention and request her to take birth as Parvati. Responding to the plea of the gods, Shakti reincarnated as Parvati (Sati), the daughter of the mountain king Himalaya, and grew into a beautiful young woman.

Narada, the sage, recounted many stories of Shiva to Parvati and encouraged her to seek his hand in marriage. Parvati then began meditating to win Shiva’s affection. However, despite her efforts, Shiva remained in deep meditation, and time passed without any change. Once again, the gods sought Vishnu’s assistance. Following Vishnu's suggestion, Kamadeva, the god of love, used his bow to shoot a love arrow at Shiva.

Shiva, disturbed from his meditation, opened his third eye in anger and burned Kamadeva to ashes as punishment. Kamadeva was thereafter transformed into Ananga, the formless one. Despite this, Parvati’s meditation was ultimately successful, leading to her union with Shiva.

Before marrying Parvati, Shiva wished to test her devotion and love for him. He incarnated as a short-statured Brahmin (known as Batu Brahmana) and approached Parvati with a challenge. Disguised in this form, he asked her why a woman of such beauty and youth would choose to marry an old man who dwelled in the smasana (graveyard), wore tree bark, and adorned himself with snakes, and wondered how she would find happiness with him.

In response, Parvati grew angry, and retorted that the Brahmin was ignorant, and wished to marry Shiva for his wisdom and did not care about his appearance.

Pleased with her unwavering devotion, Shiva revealed his true divine form. On the fifth day of the bright fortnight of Jyestha (Jyeshta Shukla Paksha Panchami), Shiva and Parvati were married.

== Historical evidence ==
King Ajit Singh, the son of Chatra Sai of the Chowhan dynasty (1695–1766), ruled the kingdom of Sambalpur. A devout Vaishnava, King Ajit Singh spent a significant portion of his time in Puri. He envisioned establishing Sambalpur as a religious centre in accordance with Vedic traditions. At that time, Saiva Upasak Brahmins (worshippers of Lord Shiva) were not present in the Sambalpur kingdom. To fulfill his religious goals, King Ajit Singh invited several Utkal Srotriya Vaidik Brahmin families from Puri to settle in Sambalpur. These Brahmin families first settled in the Nandapada locality and Ajitpur Sasan (present-day Sasan Village).

In addition to the Brahmin settlement, the king also established several temples in the area. Recognizing the historical significance of Sambalpur as a Shaktipitha (a place dedicated to the worship of the divine feminine energy) where the union of Shiva and Shakti was traditionally worshipped, King Ajit Singh sought advice from Dewan Daxina Ray. Daxina Ray suggested that the king contribute generously to the temples dedicated to the Asta Sambhu (eight forms of Shiva) in the region.

The temple at Huma, known as The Leaning Temple of Huma, dedicated to Lord Vimaleswar, was already rebuilt by King Baliar Singh on the ruins of an ancient temple constructed by Anangabhima Deva III, a king of the Ganga dynasty. Following this, Ajit Singh established seven additional temples dedicated to the Sambhus: Kedarnath in Ambabhona, Viswanatha in Deogaon, Balunkeshwar in Gaisama, Mandhata in Maneswar, Swapneshwar in Sorna, Bisweshwara in Soranda, and Nilakantheswar in Nilji.

In the Sasana villages of Puri, two of the most significant festivals are Sitalsasti and Rukmini Vivah. The Utkal Brahmins established their Ista Dev (personal deity), Lord Balunkeswar, at Balibandha, Sambalpur, and were the first to initiate the Sitalsasti Jatra under royal patronage. Later, the Aranyaka Brahmins, who primarily worship Lord Jagannath and follow the Vaishnava tradition, established the Loknath temple at Jhaduapada. They also started their own version of the Sitalsasti Jatra.

King Ajit Singh patronized the Sitalsasthi Jatra/Yatra, which commemorates the marriage of Hara (Shiva) and Parvati at Sambalpur on the Jyestha Sukla Paksha Panchami. In this festival, the marriage of the divine couple is celebrated in a manner akin to a human wedding. Several religious rituals are observed during the event, including Thal Utha (the beginning of the ceremony), Patarpendi (the binding ritual), Guagunda (invitation), and Ganthla Khula (the opening of the sacred thread).

Similar to how Lord Jagannath is revered as a Ganadevata (deity of the Ganas) during the Ratha Yatra, both Shiva and Parvati are also treated as Ganadevata during the Sitalsasthi festival.

== The ceremony ==
During the Sitalsasthi Jatra, a designated family assumes the role of Parvati’s parents and ceremonially offers her hand in marriage to Shiva. However, as Shiva is considered Swayambhu (self-existent), no family assumes the role of his parents.

During the Sitalsasthi Jatra, Shiva begins his marriage procession from his temple, accompanied by other gods and goddesses. Nrusingha (Narasimha) leads the procession to the bride’s residence. The family representing Parvati’s parents welcomes the Baraat (wedding procession) in a manner similar to traditional human weddings.

The idols of Shiva and Parvati are placed in an elaborately decorated palanquin, and the designated family members perform the Kanyadana (ceremonial offering of the bride). The marriage is then solemnised according to traditional rituals.

On the following day, the newlyweds return to the temple in a ritual known as Mandir Pravesh. The festival is celebrated with folk dance, folk music, various traditional dance forms, and themed floats, making it a grand cultural event.

Initially, the Sitalsasthi carnival was organized in two localities of Sambalpur city—Nandapada and Jharuapada. In 1972, the residents of Mudipada introduced a third procession, expanding the scale of the festival. Over time, a Joint Coordination Committee was formed to oversee the overall arrangements for the carnival.

Today, the Sitalsasthi carnival has grown significantly, with celebrations taking place across various streets of Sambalpur. The festival has also extended to nearby towns such as Bargarh, Padampur, Barpali and Jharsuguda, making it one of the most prominent cultural and religious festivals of Western Odisha.
