= Georges Le Turcq =

French jeweler

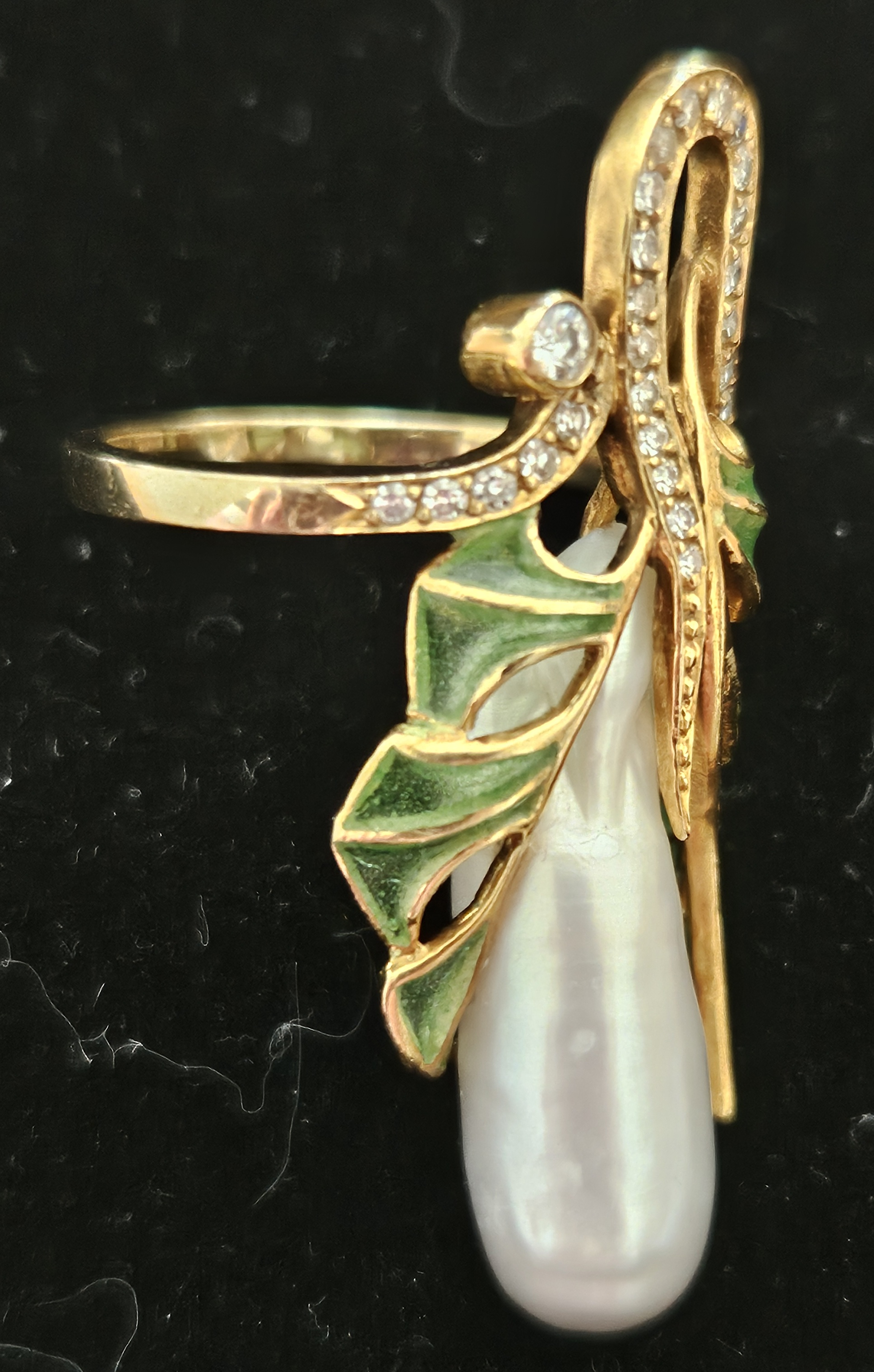
- Ring by Georges Le Turcq (c. 1900)
- Born: 1859
- Died: March 19, 1940 (aged 80–81); Paris, France
- Education: École nationale supérieure des arts décoratifs
- Known for: Jewelry design, Goldsmithing
- Movement: Art Nouveau

Georges Le Turcq (1859 – 19 March 1940) was a French jewelry designer and goldsmith prominent during the Art Nouveau period. He is known for his mastery of plique-à-jour enamel and his professional partnership with jeweler Julien Duval.

== Early life ==
Georges Le Turcq was born in 1859. He was the son of Victor Le Turcq, a metal fabricator, and Pauline Hachin, a painter of fans. His grandfather, François Le Turcq, was born François Fiquemont but was later legitimized, adopting the Le Turcq surname.

== Career ==
Le Turcq attended the École des Arts Décoratifs (National School of Decorative Arts) in Paris. There he met fellow student Julien Duval, with whom he would form a significant professional partnership.

=== Duval et Le Turcq (1885–1894) ===
In 1885, Le Turcq and Duval established the firm "Duval et Le Turcq" at 113 Boulevard de Sébastopol. The partners set out with a specific program to créer du nouveau ("create something new") rather than following traditional jewelry styles. The firm exhibited at the Exposition Universelle (1889) in Paris, where they displayed pieces featuring matte enamels and enamels on foil (paillons). Their designs featuring orchids and butterflies were particularly successful during this period.

The partnership produced several notable works:

- Vierge des Catacombes Medal (1891): Modeled after the oldest known depiction of the Virgin Mary found in the Roman catacombs, this religious medal was distinct for its thickness, contrasting with the thin medals typical of the era. It achieved enormous commercial success, selling in large quantities in France and abroad.
- Gaulois Bracelet (1890): This bracelet was created using a stamping technique (estampage). It featured patriotic motifs including the Gallic rooster and mistletoe.

In 1892, Le Turcq and Duval visited Pforzheim, Germany, to study the jewelry industry there. They co-authored a report on the state of the industry and professional training, which was presented to the Chambre syndicale de la Bijouterie and advocated for the creation of a professional school in France.

=== Independent work ===
The partnership was dissolved in 1894, and both jewelers continued to work independently. Le Turcq established his workshop at 13 Rue des Petits-Champs. On August 12, 1912, he registered a new maker's mark (poinçon) consisting of his initials and a stylized "bonnet d'âne" (dunce cap).

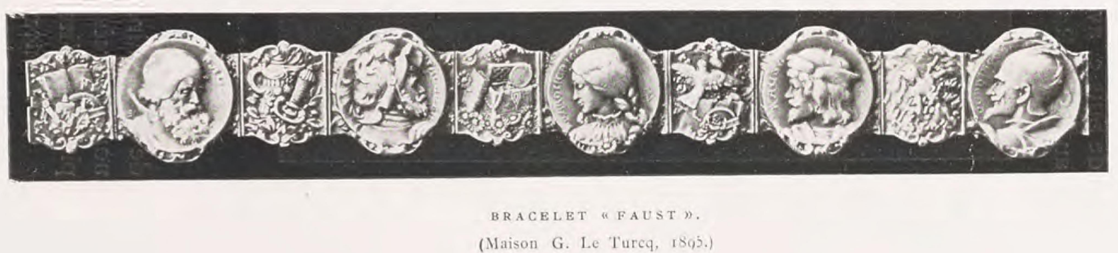
Faust bracelet by Georges Le Turcq (1895)

One of his most significant independent works was the Faust bracelet, created in 1895 to commemorate the 1,000th performance of Charles Gounod's opera Faust at the Paris Opera. Le Turcq collaborated with the medalist Vernier to create the piece using a stamping process (la frappe). The bracelet consists of chiseled medallions representing characters from the opera, including Marguerite, Faust (depicted as both young and old), Mephistopheles, and Valentin.

Le Turcq continued to produce jewelry characterized by elegant design. A notable example from this period is a gold ring (c. 1900) held by the Schmuckmuseum Pforzheim. The ring features a shank set with pavé diamonds that curves up the finger and splits in two above a baroque pearl in order to hide the setting; the design incorporates leaves filled with translucent-green plique-à-jour enamel.

Le Turcq also executed designs for other prominent jewelry houses. In 1903, he created a chased gold ewer with green enamel for Boucheron, and he produced work for the jeweler Antony Beaudoin. He was known to be a supplier for the actress Sarah Bernhardt, though he is not explicitly named in her memoirs.

== Style ==
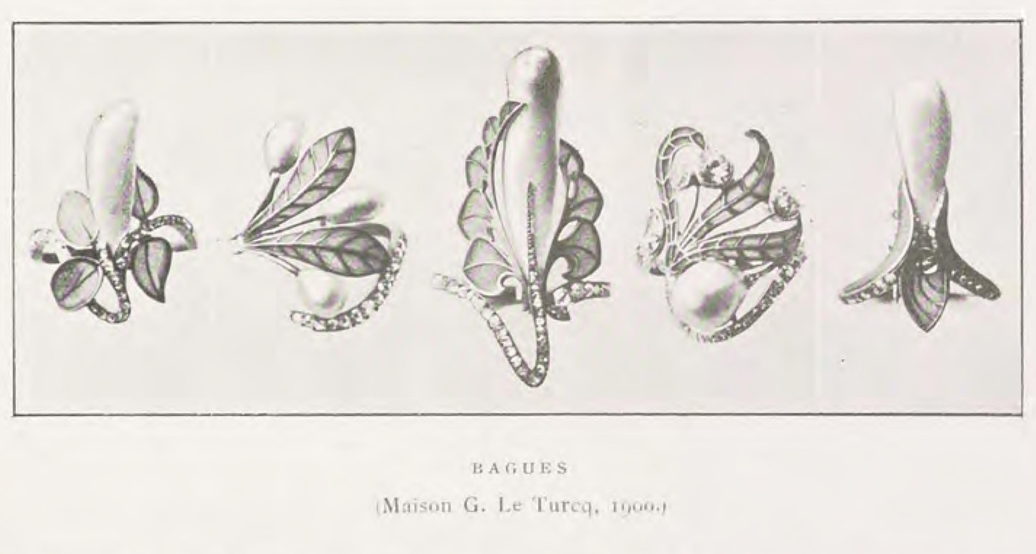
Rings by Georges Le Turq (c. 1900)

Le Turcq's output is associated with the Art Nouveau style ("Modern Style"), characterized by abstract lines and naturalistic themes. He was influenced by Japanese art, often incorporating flora and fauna into his designs.

His notable technique was plique-à-jour enamel that allowed light to pass through the enamel, mimicking stained glass. The jeweler and art historian Henri Vever noted that Le Turcq continued to execute belle joaillerie ("beautiful jewelry") and interesting enameled pieces well into the 1900s.

== Personal life ==
During the Dreyfus affair, Le Turcq signed a protest supporting Colonel Picquart, a key figure in exposing the wrongful conviction of Alfred Dreyfus.

Le Turcq died on 19 March 1940.

== Sources ==
- Bulletin des lois [Bulletin of the Laws] (in French). Imprimerie Nationale. p. 985.
- Richard, Jean-Jacques (2015). Georges Le Turcq: Un grand Joaillier Art nouveau Français [Georges Le Turcq: A Great French Art Nouveau Jeweler] (in French). BoD. ISBN 978-2-322-04374-3.
- Vever, Henri (1908). La Bijouterie Française au XIXe Siècle (1800-1900) [French Jewelry of the Nineteenth Century (1800-1900)] (in French). Vol. III. Paris: H. Floury.
- Ward, Anne G. (1981). Rings Through the Ages. Rizzoli. ISBN 978-0-8478-0397-2.
