= Lucien Gaillard =

French goldsmith and jeweller (1861–1942)

Lucien Gaillard (1861 – 1942, both in Paris, France) was a French goldsmith and jeweller, who worked in the art nouveau style.

Lucien Gaillard was born into a family of jewellers. His grandfather Amédée Alexandre Gaillard (1811-1882) founded a jewellery firm in Paris in 1840, which he then passed on to his son Ernest (1836-1909). The family firm was located at 107 rue La Boétie in Paris. Lucien Gaillard trained as an apprentice under his father, before taking over the business in 1892. His brother Eugéne was also a well known art nouveau furniture designer.

He was a contemporary of René Lalique.

After assuming control of the family firm in 1892, Gaillard focused on metalwork, frequently influenced by Japanese models. Around the turn of the century, he resumed jewelry production with the encouragement of his friend René Lalique.

Gaillard's designs, like many by Lalique, incorporated unusual materials.

He won a prize for his jewellery at the 1889 Universal Exposition. He was also a judge at the 1893 Universal Exposition in Chicago. In 1902 he was made a knight of the Legion of Honour.

He was deeply interested in Japanese art. His workshop included artists who travelled from Japan to work in ivory and lacquer. He also worked in copper.

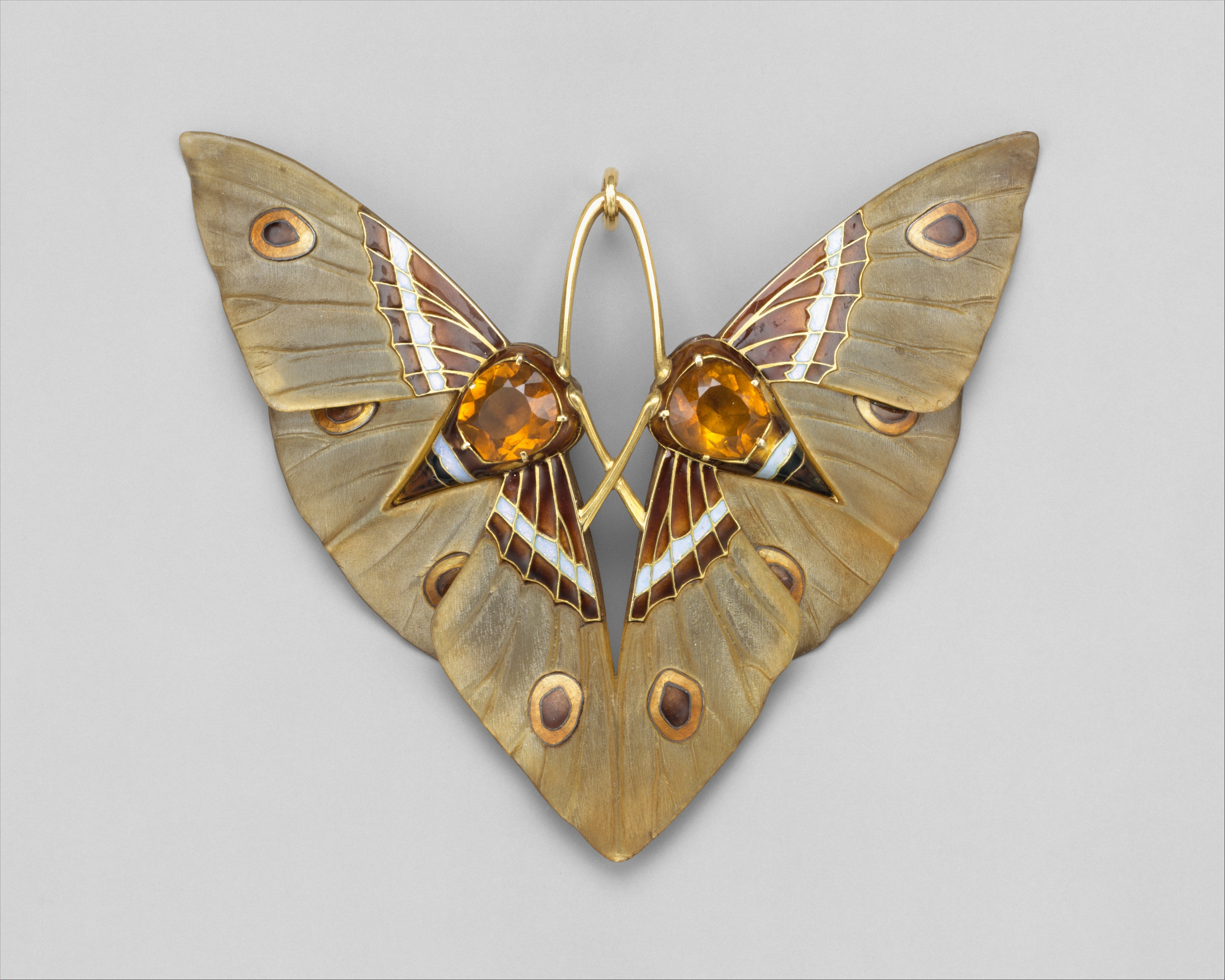
"Moth" Pendant and Box, by Lucien Gaillard, at the Metropolitan Museum of Art, New York, New York, U.S.A.

His workshop produced vases, cane heads, hair combs, pins and pendants as well as more traditional jewellery, often inspired by floral or animal motifs. The animal motifs included bees, butterflies, dragonflies and snakes. He was known for using only a single motif per item. Sometimes, when making insect wings, he used a technique called plique-à-jour, where enamel is not applied to a metal base, but rather set in a gossamer thin wire framework to produce the effect of insect wings.

Around 1910, the Gaillard workshop began to work in glass, including collaborations with several perfume houses, including Geldy and Corday.

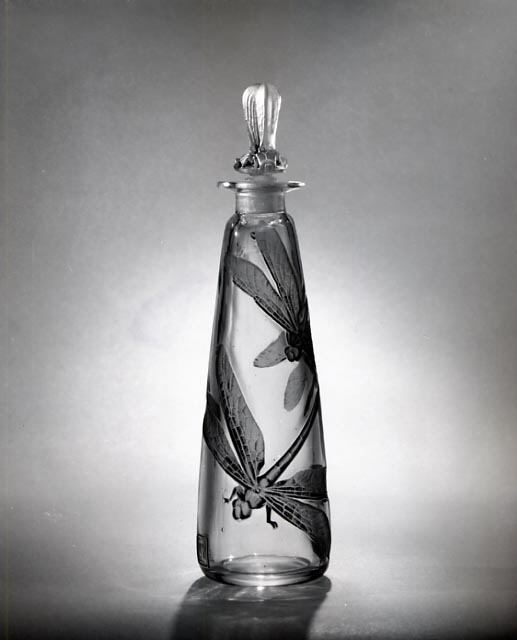
Perfume bottle, circa 1907-1914. Metropolitan museum of Art, New-York

The work of Gaillard and his workshop are on display in the Musée D'Orsay, the Metropolitan Museum and the V&A museum.
