= Mérode Cup =

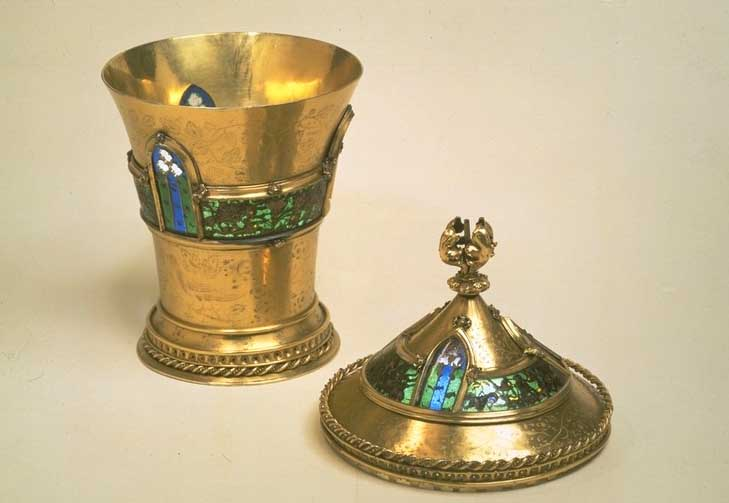
The Mérode Cup, about 1400 (V&A Museum no. 403-1872)

The Mérode Cup is a medieval silver-gilt cup decorated with finely engraved birds, fruit and vine leaves. It was made in France in Burgundy in about 1400, and was named after the ancient Belgian family of Mérode, to whom it once belonged. It is now in the Victoria and Albert Museum in London.

The cup is made of silver-gilt and is decorated with finely engraved birds, fruit and vine leaves. In the sides, cover and base are panels of the fragile and exquisite translucent enamel made using plique-à-jour, a difficult enamelling technique which involves firing the glass into cells and removing the backing to create an effect like stained glass. When the cup is placed on a shaft of light it appears to be set with miniature stained-glass windows. Pieces decorated with this sort of enamel are known from inventories of people such as the great fourteenth-century patron John, Duke of Berry, brother of king Charles V of France. This cup, however, is the only one to survive from this period.

== See also ==
- Royal Gold Cup

== Bibliography ==
- Jackson, Anna, ed. (2001). V&A: A Hundred Highlights. V&A Publications. ISBN 1-85177-365-7
