= Hedgehog Son =

Slovene and Kajkavian fairy tale

A number of fairy tales described as the Hedgehog Son, in Slovene and Kajkavian, have been collected from oral tradition in Slovenia and northern Croatia since the 19th century. The tale deals about a hedgehog born to a human woman who works as a pig herder, helps a human nobleman man and marries his daughter, who disenchants him to human form.

== Publication ==
Sin jež (English: Hedgehog Son) is a Slovenian fairy tale collected in Martinj Vrh in the mid-19th century in the compilation Glasnik slovenski and published in 1859.

The tale was also translated to German as Sohn Igel ("Hedgehog Son").

== Summary ==
In this tale, a woman has a hedgehog son. He finds work with a local farmer and takes the pigs to graze in the forest and meets a man who lost his way. The hedgehog guides him out of the forest. The man loses his way again in the next year and in the year after. On the third time, however, the hedgehog makes a deal with the man: he will guide him out of the woods, but asks for one of the man's daughters as his bride. The hedgehog comes to the man's house on a rooster and demands his bride. The man asks his daughters which will go with the little animal: the eldest says she would rather cut her own throat, the middle one that she rather throw herself in a well, but the youngest agrees to marry him. The hedgehog and his bride walk to church, but the little animal asks her to go ahead of him, while he passes by the graveyard. When he comes out on the other side, the hedgehog has turned into a handsome youth, to the girl's sisters' despair: one cuts her throat and the other jumps into a well. The now human hedgehog and the girl marry.

== Analysis ==
=== Tale type ===
The tale is classified in the international Aarne-Thompson-Uther Index as type ATU 441, "Hans My Hedgehog": a childless woman wishes for a hedgehog for a son, and one is born to her and her husband; the hedgehog goes to work with pigs in the forest and meets a monarch or a man that promises one of his daughters as reward for helping him; the hedgehog later goes to meet his intended bride by riding a rooster and marries a human girl, who disenchants him by destroying his hedgehog skin or breaking the enchantment with a kiss.

=== Motifs ===
==== The animal husband ====
Polish philologist Mark Lidzbarski noted that the pig prince usually appears in Romance language tales, while the hedgehog as the animal husband occurs in Germanic and Slavic tales. Also, according to Swedish folklorist Waldemar Liungman and Christine Shojaei Kawan (in Enzyklopädie des Märchens), in type ATU 441 the animal husband may be a hedgehog, a wild boar or a porcupine. The Grimms' notes state that in these fairy tales, "Hedgehog, porcupine, and pig are here synonymous, like Porc and Porcaril".

According to Monika Kropej, in the story Sin jež, or type 441, the main character is cursed into hedgehog form from birth, due to a wish by his old childess parents, and is only disenchanted on his wedding day.

== Variants ==
According to Swedish folklorist Waldemar Liungman and narrative researcher Ines Köhler-Zülch, tale type ATU 441 is reported in Germany, Baltic Countries, Hungary and among West Slavic (Note: Czech: Tille 1929ff.; Slovak: Gašparíková1991f. I, No. 298; Polish: Krzyżanowski 1962f. I) and South Slavic (Note: Croatian: Leskien 1915, No. 33; Slovene: Byhan 1958, 94ff., Bolhar 1974, 101ff.) peoples (although Liungman mentioned the existence of variants in Sweden, Greece, and Italy).

=== The Little Hedgehog ===
In a Slovenian tale, The Little Hedgehog (Ježek), or in the Slovenian original, Ježek Janček ("Little Hedgehog Janček"), little Jancek is accidentally cursed by his mother, turns into a hedgehog and flees to the woods. Years later, when a count becomes lost in the forest, the little hedgehog helps the nobleman in return for the hand of one of his daughters in marriage.

=== Hedgehog Son (Varaždin) ===
In a Kajkavian tale from Varaždin with the title Sin jež ("Hedgehog Son"), a childless couple pray to God to have a son, even if he is the size of a hedgehog, so God grants them one. Despite some fright at first, their hedgehog son grows up and asks his father to herd his pigs in the forest. His father agrees to let him work with the pigs so he can stay away from them. The hedgehog son grazes the pigs in the woods when he sees that the king got lost and offers to help him. They make a deal and the hedgehog guides him out of the woods. Some time later, when his pig herd is large enough, the hedgehog goes to the king's castle and demands one of his daughters as part of their deal. The king asks his three daughters which will go with the hedgehog: the eldest would rather be stabbed, the middle one would rather jump in a well, but the youngest agrees to marry him, so they marry. One day, the princess stabs the hedgehog husband, and out of the skin comes out a handsome youth, to her delight and her sisters' resignation. The now human hedgehog son goes back to his parents to introduce his wife, and shows them the loose animal skin as proof of his claims.

=== Hedgehog (Temljine) ===
In a Slovenian variant from Temljine collected by journalist Andrej Gabršček with the title Jež ("Hedgehog"), a poor peasant woman has many children. A beggar man, who is Jesus under a disguise, pays her a visit and comments she has many children, and she agrees, saying that there are many hedgehogs (in reference to her children). When she goes to rock a son, he has turned into a hedgehog. Two years later, he asks his mother to be given cows and oxen, a mare and horse, sheep and goats, for he will herd them. The hedgehog herds the cattle for years in his fields. One day, three merchants are lost in the fields and ask the hedgehog for help. The hedgehog asks if they have daughters, which they confirm. The hedgehog promises to help them in exchange for their daughters in marriage, and they sign a deal. The little animal guides the men out of his fields, and keeps herding his cattle until it becomes large enough by the time he is twenty. Finally, the hedgehog returns home and asks his mother to give her a rooster, for he will go courting his bride. The hedgehog rides the rooster to the first merchant's house to ask for his daughter, but she refuses her suitor and her father pays him a thousand guilders. Then, he goes to the second merchant's house, and his daughter also denies him, but he is given another thousand guilders as compensation. At last, the hedgehog goes to the third merchant's house and his daughter agrees to marry the animal. The priest marries them, and the hedgehog hides under the table during the party. On the wedding night, the hedgehog asks his wife to take a cooking pot and hit him with it three times. Despite some reluctance, she hits him three times, turning him into a handsome man. When the other two girls learn about the event, they hang themselves.

=== Hedgehog (Blagovica) ===
Scholar Monika Kropej published a variant collected by Slovenian author Gašper Križnik from a source in Blagovica with the title Jež ("Hedgehog"): a beggar brings news every year to the local lord, and this year he predicts the lord and his wife will have a son. The lady says that is impossible, since she is sixty years old, although she wishes to have a child, even if he is a hedgehog. Thus, one is born to them, and they place him in a shed. One day, the lord goes to the marketplace, and asks his hedgehog son what he can bring him: the first time, the animal son asks for a whip and some cake; the second time, for a rooster with golden beak and silver tail; the third time, a herd of young pigs. The hedgehog son grazes the pigs in the woods for seven years until he has a full herd. One day, a king loses his way in the forest, and the pigs accost the monarch so much he climbs up a tree to escape from the swines. He shouts for someone to save him, in exchange for his daughter and half of his kingdom, and the hedgehog son rescues him. Seven years later, the same thing happens to a second monarch, who, instead, offers him half of his kingdom and much money. The hedgehog son then decides to cash in on their monarchs' promises, and goes to meet the king that promised him money. Then, he goes to deal with the king that promised him a daughter for wife, and wants to marry one of the princesses. The king then asks his daughters which will go with the animal: the elder two refuse, save for the youngest, who agrees. During the wedding ceremony, the priest blesses the couple with holy water, and the hedgehog skin falls apart, revealing a handsome youth underneath it. The elder princesses mourn for their poor decisions so much, they fall ill and die, while the youngest princess and her now human husband reign in happiness.

=== The Story of the Little Hedgehog ===
In a Slovene tale collected by author Fran Nedeljko with the title Pravljica o ježku ("The Story of the Little Hedgehog"), a couple have no children, but wish to have one, so the woman prays to God to have a son as big as a hedgehog. Thus, a hedgehog is born to them. The man takes his porcupine son to graze the pigs, and the porcupine son manages to increase their herd many times from a batch of few pigs. When he is twenty years old, he is grazing his pigs in the forest, when he finds a count that lost his way. The count promises to repay the hedgehog for any help by giving one of his daughter, and the little animal helps the count. The hedgehog takes the pig herd to the pigpen, then goes to talk to the count to find his bride. The count explains the situation to his daughters and asks which one will go with the hedgehog: the elder two refuse, save for the youngest, who agrees to marry him so she can have a husband. On the wedding night, the hedgehog tells his wife to heat up a stove and toss him inside it. She does as he requested and out comes a handsome man from the stove. The girl's sisters lament their decision.

=== How the Hedgehog Married a Countess ===
In a tale with the title Jež dobi grofico za ženo ("How the Hedgehog Married a Countess"), (Note: Collected by priest Ivan Šašelj from a source in Bednja, and by professor Alojzij Bolhar from a source in Bela krajina.) a father and a mother are childless and sigh for not having a son, so the woman keeps praying to God for a son, even if he is a hedgehog. Thus, a hedgehog is born to her as answer to her prayers. When the hedgehog son grows up, the man buys a pig and gives it to his son, who takes it to graze in the forest and eat acorns. In time, he grazes and fattens many pigs. One day, a count loses his way in the woods and meets the hedgehog's pig herd and the little animal, who agrees to help the nobleman by signing a letter with the promise to marry the count's daughter to him. After a while, the hedgehog son takes his large pig herd back home and asks his mother to court the count's daughter on his behalf, but the woman fears for him. The hedgehog himself goes to meet the count to demand his reward and shows him the piece of paper. The count is forced to deliver his daughter to the little animal. As the town laments that the girl is being given to the hedgehog, the hedgehog crosses the threshold of the church and his animal skin falls out of his body, turning him into a handsome youth.

=== The Emperor Had a Hedgehog Son ===
In a tale titled Cesar imel ježa sina ("The Emperor Had a Hedgehog Son"), collected in Varazdin, an emperor and an empress are childless, so the empress prays to have a son no taller than a hedgehog. Thus, just like her wish, one is born to her, his body full of quills. The monarch couple feel ashamed of their son and hope to send him somewhere else, so that a fox, a wolf or other animal may devour him. After fourteen years, the hedgehog son goes to the courtyard and wishes to work in the forest, so he is given a rooster and a pregnant sow. In time, the sow bears many piglets, increasing his herd in the forest. After seven years, the hedgehog son herds the pig back to his parents' castle. They hold a dinner for their son's return and lock the pigs in the barns. The hedgehog son then announces he wishes to marry, but the empress questions where he would find a bride for one such as him. Despite her words, the hedgehog prince takes a rooster and rides to a nearby kingdom with a king and his three daughters. The king welcomes the hedgehog newcomer and learns of his journey for a bride, so he sends his own youngest daughter to marry the little animal. The king sends a servant to confirm that he is a prince, son of a emperor, and prepares a carriage for his daughter, while his son-in-law rides the rooster to church. The future couple go to confess with a priest, and the princess complains to him how she can get rid of him. The priest admonishes her at first, then advises her that she should sprinkle holy water on the newlyweds thrice, being aware of the quills, then let three droplets of blood fall on his hand. The princess returns to her bridegroom and joins him for the marriage, doing what the priest instructed her to do. The hedgehog prince turns into a handsome youth, and the couple celebrate with a grand event.

=== King Hedgehog ===
In a Slovene tale titled Kralj jež ("King Hedgehog"), sourced to Konec, a hedgehog has taken his large pig herd in the forest for seven years, so a neighbouring king goes to the forest with his hounds and tries to hunt the pigs, but the porcine herd is numerous and corner the king up a tree. The king asks for help, promising to give money and half of the kingdom to anyone, so the hedgehog appears and signs a deal with the monarch, then takes his large herd back home. The hedgehog king tells his father he will seek a bride, and his father questions the idea. Still, the hedgehog king rides a rooster to the neighbouring king he saved in the woods to claim his reward. The second king asks his elder daughter if she agrees to marry the little animal, but she refuses. The hedgehog returns a second day for the middle daughter, but she also refuses. Lastly, he appears a third day to get a bride, and the king's youngest daughter agrees to marry the animal to avoid any grim fate on their country and to protect their father. The third princess joins the hedgehog and both go to church. During the ceremony, the priest sprinkles the newlyweds with holy water, which transforms the hedgehog into a handsome human prince. Despite his human transformation, he still keeps the name "Hedgehog King". As for the elder princesses, they die of sadness for their decisions.

== See also ==
- The Enchanted Pig
- The Pig King
- King Crin (Italian fairy tale)
- The Enchanted Prince Who was a Hedgehog
- The Story of King Pig (Corsican fairy tale)

== Bibliography ==
- Grimm, Jacob; Grimm, Wilhelm (1884). "Hans the Hedgehog". Grimm's Household Tales: With the Author's Notes. Vol. 2. Translated by Margaret Hunt. G. Bell. pp. 91–96, 409–410.
