= The Enchanted Pig =

Romanian fairy tale

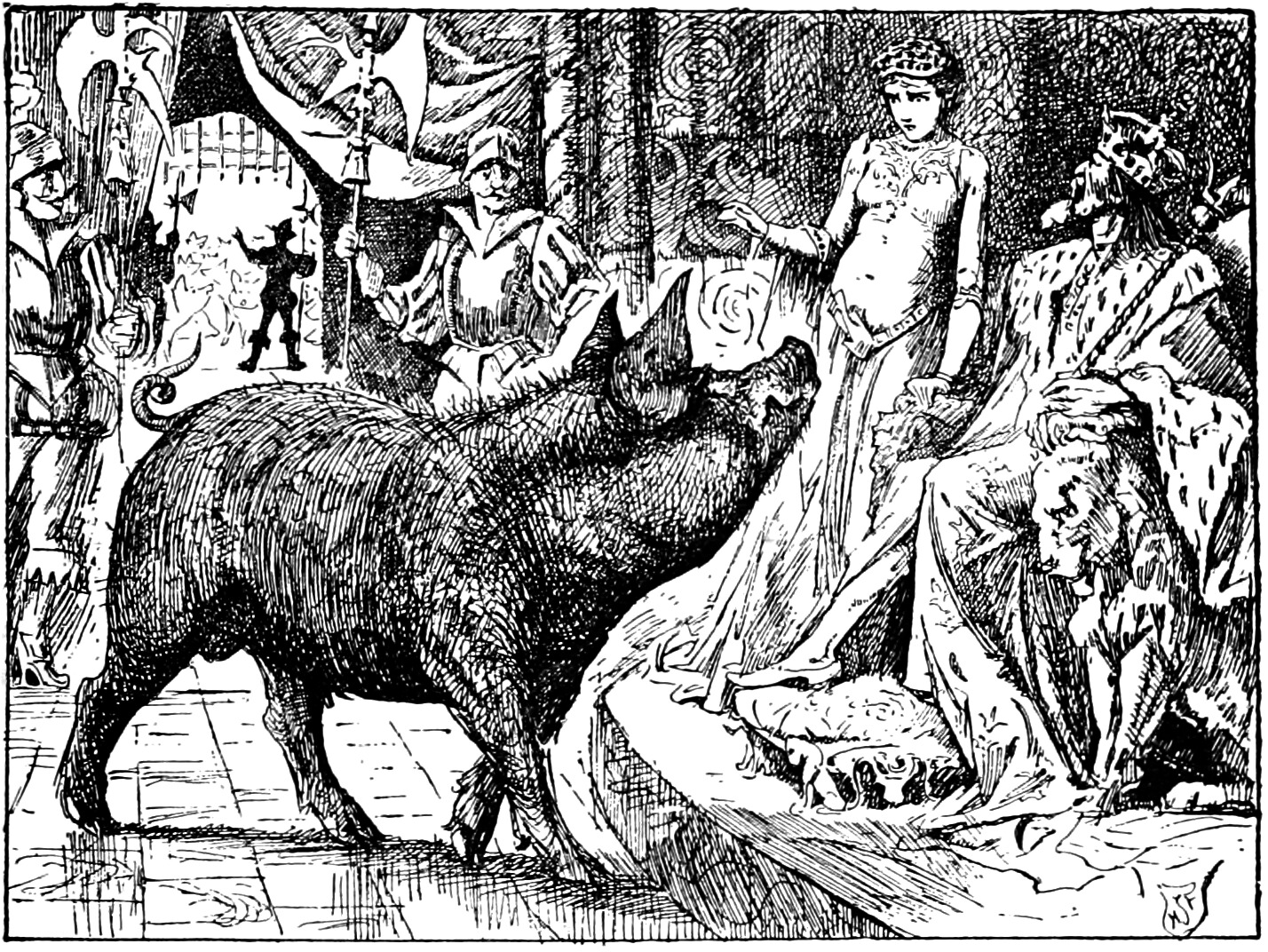
- The giant pig appears in the court to marry the princess. Illustration by Henry Justice Ford for Andrew Lang's The Red Fairy Book (1890).

Folk tale
- Name: The Enchanted Pig
- Also known as: Porcul cel fermecat The Enchanted Hog
- Aarne–Thompson grouping: ATU 441 (In Enchanted Skin); ATU 425A (The Search for the Lost Husband)
- Region: Romania
- Published in: Legende sau basmele românilor by Petre Ispirescu; Rumänische Märchen by Mite Kremnitz (1882); The Red Fairy Book by Andrew Lang (1890)
- Related: Trandafiru; Enchanted Balaur; Hans My Hedgehog; The Pig King; King Crin; The Story of King Pig; The Enchanted Prince Who was a Hedgehog

The Enchanted Pig (Romanian: Porcul cel fermecat) is a Romanian fairy tale, collected in Rumanische Märchen and also by Petre Ispirescu in Legende sau basmele românilor. Andrew Lang included it in The Red Fairy Book.

The tale is related to the international cycle of the Animal as Bridegroom or "The Search for the Lost Husband", wherein a human maiden marries a husband in animal form, breaks a prohibition and has to search for him. According to scholarship, the pig form of the enchanted husband is popular in Romania.

== Source ==
According to Ispirescu, the tale was provided by his mother, in the period of 1838-1847.

== Synopsis ==
A king goes to war and tells his daughters they may go anywhere in the castle except one room. One day, they disobey and find a book open in it. It says that the oldest shall marry a prince from the east, the second a prince from the west, and the youngest a pig from the north. The youngest is horror-struck, but her sisters manage to convince her that it is impossible.

The king returns and discovers, from the youngest's unhappiness, what they had done. He resolves to face it as best they can. A prince from the east marries the oldest, and a prince from the west the second, and the youngest becomes distressed. A pig comes to woo her, and when the king refuses his consent, the city fills with pigs. The king tells his daughter that he is certain there is something strange about this pig, and that he believes magic has been at work. If she were to marry the pig, it might be broken.

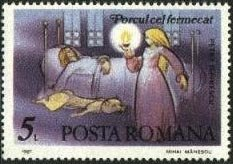

She marries the pig and goes off with him. At his home, he becomes a man every night, and is so kind that he wins her heart. She asks a witch what happened to her husband. The witch tells her to tie a thread to his foot to free him. When the young wife does so, her husband wakes and tells her that the spell would have fallen from him in three days, but now he must remain in this shape, and she will not find him without wearing out three pairs of iron shoes and blunting a steel staff.

She sets out as soon as she gets herself three pairs of iron shoes and a steel staff. She wanders far, until she comes to the house of the Moon (Sânta Lună). The Moon's mother lets her in, and while she is there, she gives birth to a son. The Moon's mother tells her that the Moon could not tell her where to find her husband, but she can go on, to the Sun. She also gives her a chicken and tells her to keep every one of the bones. The princess thanks her, throws away one pair of shoes, which was worn out, and puts on another.

She finally finds her way to the Sun's house, and the Sun's mother lets her in. She hides her, because the Sun is always ill-tempered when he returns. He is, but his mother soothes him, and asked about her husband. He cannot tell her, so his mother sends her on, to the Wind. Also, she gives her a chicken and tells her to take care of the bones. Here, she throws out the second pair of shoes.

At the Wind's house, his mother discovers that her husband lives in a wood no axe could cut through. She sends her to it, with a chicken and instructions to keep every bone. The princess goes on, although her third pair of shoes wears through, on the Milky Way. She finds the castle where her husband lives, and the bones stick together to form her a ladder to let her in. She is one bone short, and cuts off her little finger to complete the ladder. Her husband returns, and the spell on him is broken.

He reveals that he is a prince, who had killed a dragon, and the dragon's mother, a witch, had turned him to that shape and then advised her to tie the string to keep him in it. They set out to his father's kingdom, and then return to her father's kingdom.

== Translations ==
The tale was also translated and published in the compilation The Foundling Prince & Other Tales (1917). The tale was also translated as The Enchanted Hog by Robert Nisbet Bain and published as a part of a supplement in his translation of Ignáz Kunós's book of Turkish fairy tales. The tale was also translated as The Enchanted Prince by Jacob Bernard Segall.

== Analysis ==
=== Tale type ===
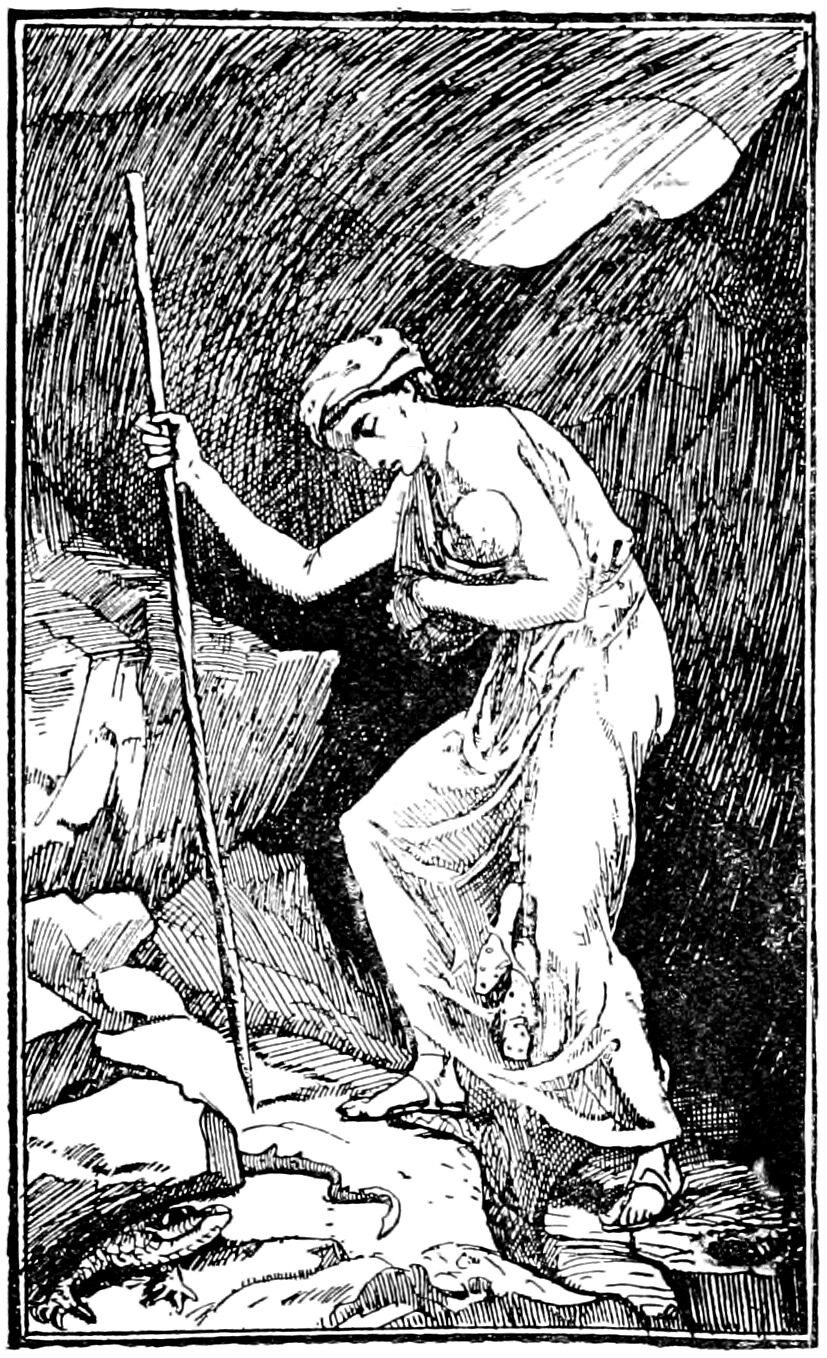
The heroine's harrowing journey. Artwork by Henry J. Ford for The Red Fairy Book.

The first part of the tale corresponds to Aarne-Thompson-Uther Index as ATU 441, "In an Enchanted Skin". Others of this type include The Pig King. This tale type is characterized by a childless couple (royal or peasant) wishing for a child, "even if it was a hedgehog" (or pig, or boar).

The second part of the tale follows Aarne-Thompson tale type 425A, "The Search for the Lost Husband": the maiden breaks a taboo or burns the husband's animal skin and, to atone, she must wear down a numbered pair of metal shoes. On her way to her husband, she asks for the help of the Sun, the Moon and the Wind. According to Hans-Jörg Uther, the main feature of tale type ATU 425A is "bribing the false bride for three nights with the husband". (Note: A similar assessment was made by scholar Andreas John: "The episode of 'buying three nights' in order to recover a spouse is more commonly developed in tales about female heroines who search for their husbands (AT 425, 430, and 432) ...") Others of this type include The Black Bull of Norroway, The Brown Bear of Norway, The Daughter of the Skies, East of the Sun and West of the Moon, The Tale of the Hoodie, Master Semolina, The Sprig of Rosemary, The Enchanted Snake, and White-Bear-King-Valemon. In Balkanic variants of the tale type, the husband curses his wife not to give birth to their child until she has sought him out.

=== Motifs ===
==== The pig husband ====
Polish philologist Mark Lidzbarski noted that the pig prince usually appears in Romance language tales, while the hedgehog as the animal husband occurs in Germanic and Slavic tales. Also, according to Swedish folklorist Waldemar Liungman and Christine Shojaei Kawan (in Enzyklopädie des Märchens), in type ATU 441 the animal husband may be a hedgehog, a wild boar or a porcupine.

Scholarship recognized the popularity of the character of the pig-husband (Romanian: soțul porc) in Romania: Romanian scholar Adolf Schullerus, in his 1928 index of Romanian tale types, identified that the bridegroom appeared as a pig in most of the available variants at the time (twelve texts), followed by a serpent (eight texts). In that regard, ethnologue Ovidiu Birlea noted that the enchanted husband in Romanian variants "usually" appears under a snakeskin or a pigskin: per his 1966 study, the enchanted husband is a snake in 25 variants and pig in 17 (18 in a 1971 study), assuming other forms in other texts, like a hedgehog, a crayfish, a frog and even a pumpkin. According to Romanian scholarship, Porcul cel fermecat, by Ispirescu, is the oldest Romanian variant about the prince in pig form.

==== Fulfilling the king's tasks ====
In Adolf Schullerus's analysis of the Romanian tales, he noted that the husband, in pig form, marries the heroine after fulfilling the suitor's tasks in the tales. According to Jan-Öjvind Swahn and Georgios A. Megas, the motif of the animal suitor fulfilling the king's tasks before he marries the heroine appears in variants from Eastern Europe and the Near East, and in Romania in subtypes 425A and 425L.

==== The heroine's helpers ====
In a study published posthumously, Romanian folklorist Petru Caraman noted that, in Romanian and in some South Slavic variants, instead of meeting the Sun, the Moon and the Wind on the way to her husband, the heroine finds incarnations of the days of the week, like Holy Wednesday and Holy Friday. They function the same as the elements and gift the heroine with golden objects. French philologist Jean Boutière, in his doctoral thesis, analysed the variants available at the time and concluded that the heroine seeks the help of Holy Wednesday, Holy Friday and Holy Sunday (which are sometimes replaced by Holy Monday and Holy Saturday), and, rarely, of the Moon, the Sun and the Wind.

Additionally, researcher Vitalii Sîrf noted that, in some Gagauz tales, the heroine goes in search of her lost husband, and meets Baba-Vineri ("Old Woman Friday"), Baba Miercuri (Gagauz: Çarșamba babusu, "Old Woman Wednesday"), Duminica-mamă (Gagauz: Pazar babusu, "Grandmother Sunday"). These characters gift the heroine with golden objects she will use to bribe the false bride.

== Variants ==
=== Romania ===
==== The Child in the Pighair Clothes ====
In a tale collected by folklorist Josef Haltrich from the Transylvanian Saxons, with the title Das Borstenkind (A serteruhás gyermek or "The Child in the Pighair Clothes"), a three-year-old prince is eating some of the apples his mother, the queen, has been peeling. Angered, she curses her son to become a wild boar. He transforms into one and escapes with other swines to the pigpen. Some time later, he reaches the cottage of a poor swineherd and his wife, who wished for child, even if it was a pig. As answer to their prayers, the porcine prince appears. They live like a family for 17 years. One day, another king decrees that her daughter should marry after her suitor accomplishes three tasks: to build a silver castle, to build a golden castle seven miles away from the silver one, and to erect a bridge between both castles made of diamond and crystal. The wild boar boy does so and marries the king's daughter, much to her disgust. One night, the princess awakes and sees a beautiful golden-haired prince, the boarskin at his side. He tells her he is a cursed king's son and wants her to keep quiet about it, lest he does not break the enchantment. Sometime later, the reveals the prince's condition to her mother, the second queen, who suggests her daughter takes the boarskin and burns it in the stove. Seeing he was betrayed by his wife - having been so close to breaking the curse - , he says to the princess he will vanish from her eyes and that he will be at the end of the world, from where no soul can save him. The distraught princess, then, decides to travel to the end of the world to save her husband: with the help of the Wind's winged steed, reaches the Moon. The Moon does know not where her husband is, but gives the princess a silver nut and allows her to ride of the lunar horse to the Sun's house. The princess next reaches the Sun's house, who also does not know where her husband it, but gives her a golden nut and advises her to consult with its children, the stars. The princess takes the Sun's horse and pays a visit to the Evening Star and the Morning Star, who point her to the end of the world, where her husband is to be married to the princess of that place. The Morning Star gives her a star-studded nut and takes her to the castle at the end of the world. The princess cracks open each nut to produce three dresses (a silver one, a golden one, and a third reflecting the stars in the sky) which she uses to trade for three nights with her husband.

==== Ion porc-împărat ====
Romanian folklorist Ion Pop-Reteganul collected a tale titled Ion porc-împărat, from a source named Ioan Hurubean. In this tale, a prince becomes a pig and is adopted by a poor human couple. The pig convinces his father to ask for the hand of the king's daughter in marriage. To dissuade the poor couple, the king sets three difficult tasks to be performed, which the pig suitor does with ease. After he marries the princess, he takes off his skin at night to become human. The princess, pregnant at this point, burns the skin. Her husband wakes up and curses her that she will not give birth to their son until he embraces her once again, and that she will only find him at the end of the world, in the city of Ciumii. Saying this, he vanishes, and the princess departs after him: after she commissions seven pairs of iron shoes and seven iron canes, she begins her quest. She reaches the house of the Mother of the Winds (Mama Vintului), who gives her some little mice, and directs her to sfinta Luna (the Moon). The Moon gives her a silver nut and guided her to sfintul Soare (the Sun). The Sun gives her a golden nut and tells her to go the Morning Star (Luceafărul). The Morning Star gives her a coloured nut and tells the princess to take a ship to the end of the world, where her husband is. The princess sails to the end of the world, to the city of Ciumii, and finds her husband as the consort of the local empress. The princess cries over her situation, and each time the magic nuts crack open to produce, respectively, silver dresses, golden dresses and dresses decorated with stars and gems. The princess uses the dresses to bribe the empress for three nights with her husband. On the third night, the emperor (her husband) awakens and places his hand on the princess, and she gives birth to a golden-haired boy.

==== Povestea cu Poarca ====
In another Romanian variant, Povestea cu Poarca, collected by writer and folklorist Cristea Sandu Timoc from Preda Petre, the first part of the tale opens with the discovery of a talking pig in a litter of pigs by the farmer. The pig is adopted by the human couple and, when he comes of age, marries a human princess. After their marriage, the pig husband takes off his porcine skin and becomes a human prince. The second part of the tale continues as the princess burns his pig skin and is forced to look for him (ATU 425). The princess meets Sinta Vineri (Holy Friday), who directs her to her husband. On the way, the princess gives birth to her child and meets her husband in a hut in the forest.

==== The Three Stars ====
Romanian ethnologue Pauline Schullerus collected a tale from Harbachtal with the title Die drei Sterne ("The Three Stars"). In this tale, a poor old couple wants to have a son that may care for them, so they exit their house and split up in the forest to find any creature they can adopt as a son. They find a pig rolling in the mud and take it as their son to raise. Years pass, the pig becomes a boar and says he wants to marry the king's daughter, so his father goes to the king and asks her hand in marriage. The king sets a task first: for the suitor to build a bridge of gold and gems, with apple trees along the path. The pig suitor fulfills the task and the princess has to marry him. After they retire to the bridal chambers, the pig takes off its skin and tells her he is an enchanted prince, and that she has to keep his secret for two days after their marriage for the enchantment to be over. The next day, the princess's mother visits her daughter and notices her mood change: horrified just before the wedding, and now quite contented. The princess reveals her pig husband is a beautiful man when he takes off the pigskin, so the queen advises her daughter to burn it the next time he takes it off. That same night, the princess takes the pigskin and throws it in the fire. Her husband wakes up and admonishes her: he is cursed again and has to depart for the city of Shalagastran; before he departs, he places an iron ring around her belly, and curses her not to give birth until she finds him again. He vanishes. The princes goes after him for seven years, and finds a woman named Friday on the road. Friday summons every bird with the crack of a whip, but none of the birds know of Shalagastran. Friday directs her to her sister Sunday, who summons all the birds. A little bird comes late and says it has come from Shalagastran. Sunday orders the bird to take the princess to Shalagastran. Just outside the city, the princess sees three youths quarreling over three magic objects: a cane that petrifies people, a cap of invisibility and a pair of shoes that can cross water. The princess tricks the youths: she uses the cane on them, takes the cap and the shoes and goes to Shalagastran to her husband's house. She wears the cap and waits inside his house for him to finish his food. Still invisible, he accidentally touches her and the iron girdles around her drop to the ground. The man sees his wife and their son next to him, but says theirs is not a joyful reunion. After their encounter, they become stars and fly to the sky, but cannot ever be together again.

==== The Piglet with Curly Hair ====
Folklorist and ethnologue Adolf Schullerus provided the summary of a tale from "Nieder-Eidisch" (Ideciu de Jos) with the title Kraushaarferkel ("The Piglet with Curly Hair"). In this tale, a queen is unpeeling an apple for herself, when her son comes in and eats the apple. The queen calls her son a swine; he turns into a piglet and runs into the forest. Meanwhile, a poor couple in the forest wishes for a son, even if he is a pig. Suddenly, the piglet appears to them, and the couple adopt him as their son. Years pass; and the piglet asks his adoptive father to go to the king and ask for the princess's hand in marriage. The king hears the old man's proposition, and orders him to fulfill tree tasks: to build a copper bridge, with trees blooming with flowers and with ripe and unripen fruits, then to build a silver bridge, and finally a golden bridge. The piglet fulfills the three tasks and gets to marry the princess. On the wedding night, the piglet takes off the porcine skin and becomes a youth "more beautiful than anyone else under the sun". On Sunday, the queen visits her daughter, who tells her that her husband is a man underneath it. The queen then advises her to give a sleeping potion to the pig, take the pigskin and burn it in the oven. The princess follows her instructions. The next morning, the human piglet looks for his covering, but does not find it. He then tells the princess his curse would have been lifted in one year, but now she will have to find him in the dark world, and vanishes. The princess goes to her parents to cry, but decides to go looking for him in iron shoes, seven dresses and with an iron cane. She passes by the Evening Star, who gives her a copper nut; the Moon, who gives her a silver nut, and thirdly the Sun, who gives her a golden nut. Finally, she reaches the dark world, where she learns her husband is to be married to the queen of the dark world. The princess then cracks open the nuts to produce three dresses (one copper, another silver, and the third golden), and waits by the church's door for the queen of the dark world. She bribes the queen with the dresses for one night with the human prince. She fails on the first two nights, but manages to wake him up on the third night. Her now human husband hears her woes of "wanting to be released from this burden"; he touches her and she gives birth to a golden-haired son.

==== The Devil's Son-in-Law ====
Author Iuliu Traian Mera published a Romanian tale in his book Din lumea basmelor with the title Ginerele dracului ("The Devil's Son-in-Law"). In this tale, a man tries to cross a river, but cannot find any exit. A devil appears and offers his help, in exchange for what the man does not know he has at home. The man agrees, and the devil ferries him across the river. When the man returns home, he discovers a son was born to his wife. Both parents worry for their son, and as the child grow older, they kiss him like it will be the last time they will ever see him. The boy, Constantin, suspects something, and one day, a wise old man tells him to fill a bag with pig's blood and threaten to kill himself in front of his parents if he does not reveal their secret. It happens thus, and Constantin stabs a bag of pig's blood, acting like it is his blood. The couple reveal the boy has been promised to the devil, and he decides to go meet him. He reaches the devil's house, who welcomes him and treats him like his future son-in-law, but he has to perform tasks first: first, to rise a valley and raze a hill overnight, so that they become a plain meadow; next, to sow wheat, harvest it, grind it into flour and bake a pie with it, all of this in a single night. The devil's daughter, having fallen in love with him, helps him in every task by summoning the devils from all over the Earth, which fulfill the task for him.

After doing the tasks, Constantin advises his wife they should escape from the Devil and worship God. The Devil's daughter accompanies him away from the Devil's lands until they reach the foot of a mountain. Constantin leaves the Devil's daughter by the foot and climbs up until he reaches Heaven and bows down before God. God gives him some gold clothes and a prickly hedgehog's skin disguise and some shabby clothes, then sends the youth on his way. Constantin forgets the Devil's daughter on the other side of the mountain and returns to his home village, where he herds the pigs in the forest in pig form ("purcurul", in the original). One day, the Red Emperor (Imparatul Rusu) loses his way in the forest and Constantin offers to help him, in exchange for his daughter. The next day, the Green Emperor (Imparatul Verde) loses his way in the forest and Constantin helps him, by making the same offer. Lastly, on the third fay, the Imparatul Galbin (Yellow Emperor) loses himself in the forest, and Constantin helps him by doing the same offer. Later, Constantin takes the daughters of the three emperors to his home village, and chooses the daughter of the Yellow Emperor as his wife. He marries her, and he spends his days in the porcine disguise. Constantin's mother wants to see her handsome son, and dislikes that he is still wearing the prickly coat despite marrying a princess, to the mockery of the locals. His father is also worried, for he knows of his son's golden coat, telling him time and time again to ditch his disguise, for he is fed up with the mocking laughter of the village. Still, Constantin dismisses their concerns. Some time later, his mother goes to talk to the princess, and both conspire to get rid of the pigskin: at night, when Constantin is asleep, the princess steals the pigskin and gives to her mother-in-law to burn it in an oven. The stench of the burning alerts Constantin, who wakes up with a start. He says he will vanish into the world, and curses his wife not to bear their child until he lays a hand on her womb again, then departs. He wanders off with a stick in hand until he reaches a castle in a meadow, ruled by a woman, and becomes lord of the castle.

As for the princess, his wife, after mourning for a while, she decides to go after him. After a long wandering, she reaches the houses of sfânta Mercuri (Holy Wednesday), sfânta Vineri (Holy Friday) and sfânta Duminică (Holy Sunday), who each welcome her and ask her to work for them for a whole year. After each year, Holy Wednesday gifts the princess a golden cofiţe (a type of mug), Holy Friday a golden hen with chicks, and Holy Sunday a golden distaff and a golden caier (hemp bundle). Holy Sunday also directs the princess to Constantin's location with some instructions. The princess goes on yet another long journey, until she sees a beautiful castle in the distance. Following Holy Sunday's instructions, she stands by a fountain and takes out the golden objects to draw the attention of the local queen's servant: the golden mugs on the first day, the golden hen with chicks on the second, and the golden distaff and hemp bundle on the third. Each time, the servant reports to her mistress, an old woman ("baba", in the original), about the stranger with the golden items, and the women wishes to have them. The princess agrees to a deal: the golden item for one night in Constantin's chambers. The woman agrees and lets the princess in, but she gives Constantin a soporific drink made of some herbs and flowers in the first two nights. The princess tries to wake Constantin, begging him to touch her belly, but he is fast asleep. After two nights, Constantin is told about the stranger who has come to his room at night, and avoids drinking the old woman's potion on the third night. The princess trades the distaff and hemp and enters her husband's room, begging over his body to wake up and touch her. Constantin opens his eyes and touches his wife, allowing her to give birth to their son, a boy as handsome as Fat-Frumos. Constantin punishes the old woman by tying her to a wild horse and releasing it in the wilderness, then lives with the princess and their son in the palace.

==== The Prince with the Pig's Head ====
Romanian historian Nicolae Iorga collected a tale from a Romanian informant in Jassy (Iași), which he translated to French with the title Le prince à tête de cochon ("The Prince with the Pig's Head"). In this tale, a king has three daughters. One day, he is going to depart for war and allows the princesses to open every room in the house, save for a specific one on the right. After the king leaves, the princesses grow bored and decide to explore the forbidden chamber to discover its secret. They open it and find a book predicting their future marriages: the elder shall marry the king of the Orient, the middle one the king of the Occident, and the youngest shall marry a pig. The youngest is sad by this revelation. The king returns and learns of his daughters' transgression, but does not punish them. In time, the predictions come true, and the elder sisters are indeed married to kings. Soon enough, the pig suitor arrives at the castle with an army of pigs to force the king to deliver his cadette to him. The king reluctantly agrees to the marriage and gives the princess to the pig, who accompanies the pig to a modest mansion. They live like husband and wife, but the princess senses a human presence beside her at night. Time passes, and the princess is visited by an old lady. The old lady tells the princess the pig husband is no ordinary animal, and she is to tie a thread of linen on his right foot, before he changes back to a pig by the first rays of dawn. The princess follows her instructions: at night, the thread bursts, and the man awakes with a startle. He explains he is the cursed son of an emperor, and his curse would have been lifted in three days, but, due to the princess's curiosity, he has to endure three years more. However, she can still reach him, by donning three pairs of iron shoes and a steel cane. Starting her journey, she passes by the houses of Sainte Lundi (Holy Monday), Sainte Vendredi (Holy Friday), Saint Soleil (Holy Sun) and Saint Vent (Holy Wind) on her way to her husband, and spends the night in Holy Friday's house, at Holy Sun and his mother's hut, and Holy Wind and his mother's, where she eats some black chicken and keeps the bones for herself. On the way to Holy Sun, she gives birth to a beautiful son. When she reaches Holy Wind's house, the Wind points to her husband's location: a house deep in the woods. The princess takes her son to the woods and builds a ladder with the chicken bones, but is missing the last step, so she cuts off her left little finger and enters it. Her husband explains he went to war against the dragons, killed the youngest one and was cursed by their mother into pig form. The couple then reunite.

==== Tale of the Bewitched Pig (Cloșca) ====
In a Romanian tale collected from teller Marinela Gheorghe, in Cloșca, Tulcea, in 1985, with the title Povestea Porcului vrăjit ("Tale of the Bewitched Pig"), an emperor has three daughters, and his wife dies. One day, he has to depart for war, and gives his daughters the keys to the palace, but forbids them to open a certain door. After the emperor leaves, the girls decides to open every door, including the forbidden one, where they read a book predicting the elder sister shall marry an emperor from the East, the middle one the emperor from the West, and the youngest a pig. The elder two dismiss the predictions, but the cadette worries about her future. The emperor returns and scolds his daughters for disobeying him, while comforting the cadette. However, just as predicted, the emperors from the East and West come to court the elder two, and eventually the pig suitor appears at the emperor's door. The emperor orders the pig to build a golden bridge from the edge of the realm to the palace, with trees and birds along the way. The pig and his pig minions work overnight and fulfill the emperor's task. The emperor gives his daughter a carriage and sees her off. On the way to the pig suitor's palace, the pig plays in the mud and goes to kiss the princess inside the carriage, which she indulges. The princess reaches the pig suitor's palace, which is filled with gems and precious jewels. She readies herself to her wedding and marries the pig, who removes the pigskin at night to become a tall, handsome and dark-haired prince.

They live like this for three years: the pig prince lives as a swine by day, and human by night. One day, an old woman appears at the pig prince's palace and the princess goes to talk to her. The tale explains the old woman was the one who cursed the prince into porcine form, and she advises the princess to prepare a pyre at night and burn the pigskin, which the prince places near his side of the bed for safekeeping. That same night, the princess unties the pigskin from her husband's body - a method he uses to keep it safe -, and tosses it in the oven, but the skin crackles and releases a smell of burning around the house, so she returns to sleep. However, the prince wakes up with a start, admonishes his wife that his curse would have ended in three days' time, tells his wife to wear down nine pairs of "opince" (a type of footwear) and three staves of horn, and curses that neither of them shall grow old, then vanishes. The princess mourns for her husband, but soon commissions a blacksmith for the nine pairs of footwear and a shepherd for the three staves, and begins her journey. On the road, the way is hard, for she is pregnant, but she eventually reaches the forest house of Sfânta Vineri (Holy Friday), and a church amidst fir trees that belongs to sfânta Duminică (Holy Sunday). Holy Friday and Holy Sunday each welcome the princess and give her a chicken roast, whose bones she takes with herself. The princess also gives birth to her child, a boy with golden hair like hers and dark eyes like his father's. Holy Sunday then sends the princess to the house of her sister, Mama Vântului (Mother of the Winds). Lastly, the princess arrives at the house of Mama Vântului-de-Zi (Mother of the Morning Wind), who does not know where her husband is, so she points to her sister, Mama Vântului-de-Seară (Mother of the Evening Wind). The Mother of the Evening Wind hides the princess and asks the Evening Wind if he saw anything, and he says he saw a hut in a forest. The princess takes her son with her deep in a forest, beyond stumps and brambles, and finds a hut with no visible door, save for the roof. She uses the chicken bones to build a ladder and cuts off her little finger to provide the last step. The princess places her son in a nearby bed and cooks something for herself. The prince appears at the hut and finds his wife and son, then returns with them back home.

==== Literary variants ====
Romanian author and raconteur Ion Creangă developed a literary treatment of the story with his tale Povestea porcului (English: "The Story of the Pig", French: Le Conte du Porc, German: Das märchen vom Schwein), also classified as ATU 425A, "Search for the Lost Husband". In his story, a very elderly couple live together, and the woman sends her husband to find them a son, no matter their species. The old man ventures into the forest and finds a hut; inside, a sow with twelve pigs. As soon as the man approaches the pigs, the sow runs away with eleven piglets, leaving a single animal that does not join the others. The man adopts the remaining pig as their son. When the king announces that he will marry his daughter to whoever performs some tasks (to pave a golden bridge in front of the palace, and to build a palace that rivals the king's), the pig suitor does and marries the princess. After the marriage, he takes off his pig skin at night. His wife burns the pig skin in the oven and he curses her not to give birth to their child until she finds him, Făt-Frumos, in a place called Mănăstirea-de-Tămâie (The Monastery of Incenses), and he places his hands on her again. The princess begins her quest and pays a visit to incarnations of Holy Wednesday, Holy Friday and Holy Sunday. Holy Wednesday gives her provisions for the road (a loaf of blessed bread and a glass of wine), and a golden distaff; Holy Friday gives the princess a golden reel; and Holy Sunday gives her a golden plate and a golden hen with chicks. With their help, she reaches her remote destination, the Monastery, and uses the gifts to bribe a terrible sorceress for three nights with her husband (one gift for one night). He husband wakes up on the third night and places his hand on her body, finally allowing their child to be born. The tale explains that the sow was the sorceress in porcine form with her eleven daughters in pig form, for she wanted to marry the prince to one of his daughter and cursed him into pig form. Free at last, the now human pig prince reunites with his wife and punishes the sorceress.

=== Europe ===
==== Eastern Europe ====
===== Ukraine =====
In a Ukrainian tale collected by folklorist Mykola Zinchuk from a source in Chernivtsi with the title "Зачарований царевич" ("Enchanted Prince"), a very old couple live together. One day, the old woman tells her husband to fetch a bag, wander the world and bring home a creature they can raise as their son. The old man takes the bag and enters a forest. He spots a little hog stuck in the mud, bags the animal, and brings it home. He and his wife wash the animal and raise it as their son, whom they name Ivasyk. The hog grows up and asks his parents to buy some grains in the market. The old man goes to buy some corn, then goes home and reports that he heard the tsar will marry his daughter to the person that can build a golden bridge and golden palace. The hog speaks again and asks his adoptive father to tell the tsar his swine son will fulfill the monarch's request. The old man goes to the tsar and announces his son can fulfill his request, but the monarch laughs at the man and sends for the man's son. The old man returns and brings the hog son with him to the court. The hog son wanders out and about, then the tsar orders the man and his hog son to fulfill the task on penalty of death. Back home, the old couple sleeps, while the hog takes out two "бурдюги" and summons an army of bees to build the golden bridge and the golden palace for him. The next morning, the old man goes to the tsar's court again to say the task has been fulfilled, and the tsar, advised by his ministers, marries the princess to the hog. At night, however, the hog takes off the swineskin to become a handsome youth, then puts on the animal skin in the morning. After two weeks, the princess pays a visit to her parents and tells everything: the tsar advises not to do anything, while the queen tells her to heat up the oven after he goes to sleep. That same night, the princess heats up the oven and tosses the swineskin into the fire. The now human hog husband embraces his wife and admonishes her for her action, saying that in two years he would have been rid of the porcine skin, then places an iron ring around her body, and tells her to find him at "Ладановім монастирі" ("Monastery of Incenses"), then vanishes, along with the golden palace and bridge. The princess tries to take shelter with her father, but he expels her. She then begins a long journey to find her missing husband: she passes by the house of Holy Wednesday (Sviata Sereda), who takes her in and summons all the animals of land, the birds and the snakes, and none knows the location of the Monastery. Holy Wednesday gives her a golden swift ("мотовило") and directs her to Holy Friday (Sviata P'jatnitsa), who also summons the animals, but none can tell the location of such a place. Holy Friday gives the princess a golden spinning wheel. Finally, the princess reaches the Holy Virgin, who also summons the animals to help the princess: the birds fly all over the world to locate the Monastery, but do not find it, save for the lark, which knows the way. The Holy Virgin orders the lark to take the princess there, despite its injury, and gives her a golden hen with chicks. The lark takes the princess to the Monastery, despite its small size, and, after they land, advises her to use the objects to draw the attention of Baba Yaga's servant. The princess does as instructed, takes out the objects she received from her helpers and trades them with Baba Yaga for a night with her husband, each item for each night. The first two nights, Baba Yaga gives the princess's husband some milk laced with potion for him to fall into a petrified state. The princess tries to talk to him for the first two nights, begging her to be released from the iron hoop she has been wearing for three years, to no avail. The morning after, his friend tells Ivasyk he hears a woman's voice talking to an asleep Ivasyk, and Ivasyk realizes it is his wife, so he avoids drinking the milk that same night. On the third night, the princess cries over her husband's body, he wakes up and touches the princess, allowing her to give birth to their son. Ivasyk orders Baba Yaga and her servant to be tied to a horse, while he takes the witch's own magical horse and flies back to his parents with his wife, their son and friend. Mikola Zinchuk classified it as East Slavic type SUS 433B.

===== Gagauz people =====
In a tale from the Gagauz people with the title "Заколдованный молодец" ("Enchanted Youth"), an old couple have no son, so decide to find any animal to be their child. The old man finds a piglet in the mud and brings it home. Some time later, the piglet begins to talk, and tells his father he will marry the boyar's daughter. His father takes the piglet to the boyar's court to ask for his daughter's hand, and the boyar sets a task for him: to build road between the piglet's house and the palace, sided by gardens with trees of golden apples and singing birds of paradise. The piglet fulfills the task, but the boyar sets another one: to have his castle stand on water. The piglet also fulfills the task, and gets to marry his daughter. During the wedding, the piglet takes off its skin and becomes a handsome youth. After they go to bed, the boyar's daughter takes the skin and throws it in the oven. The next morning, the youth cannot find the pigskin, and ties an iron ring around his wife's belly, cursing her not to give birth until he places his hand on her again, and vanishes. The boyar's daughter begins her quest, and meets Jumaa-babu ("Grandmother Friday") and Pazar-babu ("Grandmother Sunday"). Pazar-babu summons the birds of the world, and one tells the youth is under Jada-babu's power. Pazar-babu gives the boyar's daughter a golden spinning wheel, a golden arshin and a golden reel, and tells her to go to the fountain, draw out the golden objects to attract Jada-babu's attention, and bribe her for a night with her husband. The boyar's daughter does as instructed and sells the golden objects. She manages to wake her husband on the third night, he places his hand on her body and their child is born.

==== Central Europe ====
===== Germany =====
In a German variant from Silesia titled Der Brunnen ("The Fountain"), collected by literary historian Heinrich Pröhle and later republished by German folklorist Will-Erich Peuckert, a father sends his three daughters to fetch water from the well to cure him. The first two go to the well and hear a voice telling them to stay by the voice's owner, and in exchange he will give them the water. Out of fear, they rush back home. The third daughter, whom her father loves the most, goes to the well and agrees to the voice's proposal. Later, a hedgehog (German: Igel) comes to the girls' house and goes to sleep in the third sister's bed. The hedgehog takes off the animal skin, becomes a human prince and sleeps by the third sister's bedside. The elder girls take the animal skin and burn it. The next morning, the prince wakes up and, seeing that the skin is burnt, tells the third sister that she will only find him by wearing down an iron cane and a pair of iron shoes, then going to the Glass Mountain. He vanishes, and the girl goes after him. On her quest, she meets a Star, the Sun and the Moon, and gains three nuts from them. Finally, she reaches the Glass Mountain and climbs it, arriving at a castle. The girl takes up a job as a maidservant, in order to be closer to the prince, who is set to be married to the mistress of the castle. Each night, the girl cracks open a nut; a splendid dress comes out of it: the first, a dress shining like starlight; the second gleaming like moonlight, and the third bright as sunlight. The girl uses the three dresses to bribe the prince's bride for three nights in his room. The first two nights, she fails to wake him up, but on the third he wakes up. The girl and the prince marry, and he expels the second bride.

===== Slovenia =====
In a Slovenian tale translated into Russian with the title "Граф-боров" ("Count Borov"), a countess longs to have a child, and, after seeing a sow with its piglets, wishes to have a son, even if he is a piglet. Thus, one year later, she gives birth to a piglet, to her husband's consternation. Twenty-four years pass, and the countess's son, now a pig, demands his mother finds him a wife. The countess finds a poor servant with three daughters and brings in the man's elder daughter as her son's bride. The poor man's wife is cautious about the deal, but her daughter agrees, thinking about becoming a countess herself, and the countess pays three hundred florints. A wedding is arranged and celebrated. During the celebration, the pig count dirties himself in the mud and goes to clean himself in the bride's dress, but she rebuffs and insults him, calling him a pig with a pig's manners. The pig count becomes sad. The following year, the pig count sends for the middle daughter, who also wants to marry the pig son due to his properties. During the second party, the middle daughter calls him a pig. The year after, the pig count sends for the youngest daughter, who marries him. The pig count dirties himself again and goes to clean up on his bride's lap. The girl defends him this time. At night, the pig count removes his porcine skin and becomes a handsome youth. The countess approaches her daughter-in-law, who reveals her son is handsome under the pig disguise, so the countess suggests she steals the pigskin and burns it in the oven. It happens thus, at midnight, and the countess burns her son's disguise. In the morning, the pig count cannot find the pigskin, and admonishes his wife for her deed, since his mother could not see him in human form, so he must vanish. He also proclaims that his human wife shall seek him out beyond seven mountains, seven valleys and after crying rivers of tears, and departs. Time passes, and the pig's wife decides to look for him: she meets the First Wind, the Second Wind and the Third Wind, who each gives her a nut, to be opened in the time of direst need, and the Third Wind gives her a pair of magic boots, so she can take large steps to reach her husband's castle, where he is set to be married to another woman. The pig's true wife cracks open the three nuts and finds a golden ring, golden earrings, and a dress embroidered with gems and pearls, which she uses to bribe the false bride for three nights with her husband. She fails on the first two nights, but wakes him up on the third one. During the wedding, the pig count, now human, asks the guests the riddle of the old and the new key, and which he should keep. The tale was originally collected with the title ''Grofič prašič'' ("Count Pig"), from informant Ivan Jelen in Mežica, Slovene Carinthia. The Slovenian Folktale Catalogue, devised by scholar Monika Kropej, classifies the tale as type ATU 441 and ATU 425A.

===== Poland =====
In a tale collected from teller Józefa Pidek, from Bychawka, in Lublin, with the title O królewiczu zaklętym w wieprzka ("The Tale of a Prince Who was Turned into a Hog"), an old couple have no son. One day, the old man goes to the market and buys a hog to bring to his wife. The old couple feed the hog and raise it as their son. Years later, the hog asks his adoptive father to ask for the hand of the local king's daughter in marriage. The old man goes to the king to report the hog's proposal and the king, in response, orders the hog to build a golden road between the old couple's hut and the palace, otherwise the old man loses his head. The hog fulfills the king's task, but the monarch orders him to bring a herd of 100 mares and their 100 foals, each of them with golden bridle and fetters. The hog also fulfills the second task, and marries the princess, to the queen's immense sadness. On the wedding night, the princess waits for her hog husband, but, when she lies on their bed, she sees a handsome youth, who explains he is enchanted underneath the porcine skin and they have to wait a whole year for the curse to be broken. The next morning, the princess wakes up contented and her mother asks her the reason for such happiness. After much insistence, the princess tells the queen about the human under the hog skin, and she advises her daughter to place some hot coals next to his bedside, so her husband kicks the hogskin out of the bed and into the coals. The princess follows her mother's words and lets the hogskin burn. Her husband wakes up and, noticing the lost skin, hits her nose, drops of her blood falling on his shirt. He then gives her a ball of yarn, telling her to use it if she wants to find him, and vanishes. After a while, the princess decides to look for her husband and casts the ball of yarn before her to find a path. With the yarn, she passes by three houses belonging to her in-laws, a prince, a sorcerer and a woman. The first two expel her and deny her shelter, but she is welcomed by the woman. Her sister-in-law tells her the human hog is preparing for his wedding to another bride, but they are washing a bloodied shirt. The princess is to wash the shirt and seize the opportunity to hide behind a door and crack a ring in two to jog her husband's memory. The princess follows her sister-in-law's advice and goes to the nearby castle where she washes her husband's bloodied shirt. During the wedding, the princess hides behind a door and breaks a ring in two: a pigeon flies to her shoulder and another perches on the human hog. The event makes the human hog recall his memory and he recognizes his true wife, the princess.

===== Sorbian language =====
In a Sorbian tale published by Sorbian ethnologue Pawol Nedo with the title Pan Hibšik or Pan Hibschik, a couple have a son named Pan Hibšik, who "walked in the skin of a pig" during the day, and becomes a human person at night. This greatly troubles his parents, who try to seek the help of wise men. Still, the boy grows up and eventually marries a maiden. The girl dislikes her husband's situation, and plans to burn the pigskin. She takes the pigskin and throws it in the oven; Pan Hibšik smells the stench and senses its burning, then runs away from home. He does not return the next morning, and his wife goes after him. On his journey, she passes by the houses of the Wind (Vetar) and his wife, his brother Moon (Mesec) and his wife, and lastly, by the house of their brother, the Sun (Sunce) and his wife. In each house, the wives of the elements, three old women, give the maiden three hazelnuts for her to use in case of extreme need. The Sun also knows where Pan Hibšik is: in a nearby village, where he is to be married to another wife. The maiden goes to the village and notices the grand wedding party for her husband Pan Hibšik, then walks out to the forest, in great distress. Suddenly, she remembers the old women's words and cracks open the hazelnuts: they produce fine dresses she uses to attend the wedding feast for three days. On the third day, she cracks opens the hazelnut given by the Sun's wife and finds a gown woven with golden thread. She attends the feast, and her husband recognizes her. Pan Hibšik takes his wife back to his parents.

==== Lithuania ====
In a Lithuanian variant, The Hedgehog and his Bride, a hedgehog is adopted by a poor old couple. The animal, named Prickly, insists he will marry the king's daughter, but first he must perform some tasks for him. He is successful and marries the princess. At night, the woman sees her husband is a handsome man, after he takes off his animal skin. One day, a servant unknowingly burns the hedgehog's enchanted skin and the prince tells his wife she must go on a quest for him, since he was so close to breaking the curse, had the servant not burnt the animal skin. He disappears, and the princess talks to her father-in-law how she can find him. The father-in-law wanders many years until he reaches the sea shore, and summons his son, by saying the princess is looking for him. The hedgehog son comes out of the sea in the shape of white foam and tells his father to have the princess herself come to him. The princess then goes to her husband's location, and learns from him the way to save him. Near the end of the tale, both she and her husband agree to be turned into frogs by some witches in order to prove their loyalty towards each other. At last, they are transformed back into humans.

==== Serbia ====
In a Serbian tale titled Златокоси јунак у прасећој кожи ("The Golden-Haired Youth in a Pig's Skin"), a couple have no son, so the woman goes to church and prays to God to have a son, whatever their form. Thus, nine months later, a pig is born to them. Six years later, the pig asks his parents to buy him a sow and piglets, so he can fatten them. Hoping to get rid of the swine son, they fulfill their request, and he goes to the forest to herd the pigs. Ten years later, when the pig is in the forest, a count loses his way in the forest, and meets the pig herd. He recognizes the pig as the son of such and such a couple, and asks to be led out of the forest. The pig agrees, in exchange for giving the count's elder daughter as his wife; if the elder refuses, he should be given the middle one; if the middle one also refuses, the youngest shall be his bride. The pig takes the count to his home, and warns him to remember his promise. Then, the pig returns home and reunites with his parents, who asks how he has fared in all these years. The pig son explains he wants to marry one of the count's daughters, and asks his mother to court one of the girls on his behalf. The pig's mother asks how can a girl marry a pig, and he tells her not to worry. The elder daughter is brought to the couple's house, their bridal bed prepared and the bride made to lie on it. The pig comes to their bed and tries to approach her, but she rebuffs him. For this, he kills her. The pig sends for the middle daughter, who also rejects him on the bridal bed. Lastly, the youngest sister is brought to the pig and, being the "smartest one of the three", embraces the pig, thus surviving. The pig asks her to change the bed: while she does this, the pig takes off the pigskin and becomes a handsome youth with hair golden and shining as the sun. Delighted with this turn of events, she embraces him, and asks him about the situation: the pig son's name is Milan, and he just has to wear the pigskin for three months, then he will be human permanently when he is seventeen years old. He locks the pigskin in a closet, places the key under his pillow and bids his wife keep the secret, lest something bad befalls them. The next morning, Milan puts on the pigskin again. While he, in pig form, goes to check on his pig herd, his mother asks the girl how she can live with a swine bridegroom, and the girl reveals he is in fact a handsome youth underneath the pigskin. The pig's mother asks her daughter-in-law to leave the key out of the lock so she can see the transformation for herself, steal the pigskin and give it to her so it will be burnt in the oven. The girl follows her mother-in-law's advice that night. Sensing the smell of burning, Milan wakes up, curses his wife not to give birth until he places his right hand on his body, and vanishes. Some time later, the girl goes after him with a staff, and reaches the house of the Mother of the Moon (where she gains a golden spindle), the house of the Mother of the Sun (where she gains a golden distaff), and finally the house of the Mother of the nine Jugovics ('Југовића', in the original). Each of the Jugovics winds, the elder named Bogdan, does not know where Milan is, save for the youngest wind, who reveals he has taken another wife. The Mother of the Jugovics advises the girl to choose two of the winds who will take her there. She makes the journey and reaches the house of Milan's new wife, where she asks to spend the night. She takes out the golden objects and draws the attention of Milan's new wife, whom she trades for a night with Milan. The girl tries to wake him up on the first night, to no avail, since he is fast asleep, but succeeds on the second night: Milan wakes up, places his hand on his wife's belly and she gives birth to their children, a boy and a girl with golden hair. The family leaves the house and the girl summons the Jugovics that brought her there, so the winds can take them back to her parents-in-law' house. The winds obey and bring Milan and his family back to his parents' house. The count then invites his son-in-law and family to live with him.

=== Asia ===
In a Russian-language tale from Chita, Zabaykalsky Krai, in Transbaikal, with the title "Сынок-Поросёночек" ("The Little Pig Son"), a poor old couple worries that, now in their old age, they have no one to call their son, so they decide to adopt the first creature they find. The old man goes to the woods and sees a sow and its eleven piglets walk in the mud, while one stays behind. The old man takes the stray piglet home and raises it as his son, while his wife feeds and takes care of it. Years later, the old man goes returns home from the market with good news: the king has decided to marry his daughter, the princess, to any youth that can build a crystal bridge, with gardens alongside the path and with singing birds. Just as he says that, the little piglet tells them he can fulfill the king's orders and marry the princess. The old man goes to the king to tell him his son, the pig, wants to try his luck in building the bridge. The little pig appears in court and tells the king to look over the window: the crystal bridge is there! The king, not wanting to go back on his word, delivers his daughter to the pig and they move out to a palace. On the wedding night, the piglet enters the bedroom, takes off the porcine skin and becomes a handsome youth. The next day, he puts on the pigskin. This goes on for several days, until the princess visits her parents and tells them about her husband's pigskin: the king warns her against doing anything, while the queen suggests she takes the skin and burns it in an oven. The princess follows her mother's advice and burns the pigskin. The pig youth wakes up and, upon seeing his wife's deed, despairs that a whirlwind will take him away and she can only find him in the crystal monastery. The man disappears, and so do their castle and the crystal bridge. She begins to walk through the forest until she reaches the hut of Saint Sereda, who welcomes her. Saint Sereda gives the princess a golden reel and summons the animals and the birds to ask the location of the crystal monastery. The princess continues on her journey and meets Saint Pyatnitsa on her hut. After spending the night there, Saint Pyatnitsa summons the animals and the birds to divine the location of her husband, but they also do not know. She then gives the princess a golden spindle and sends her on her way. Lastly, the princess reaches the hut of Saint Troitsa, who also summons the animals; a small lark knows the location of the crystal monastery. Saint Troitsa gives the princess a tray with a golden hen and its chicks, and orders the lark to take the girl there. Once she reaches the crystal monastery, the princess is asked by a servant what is the motive of her presence. She says she is looking for her husband; and the servant reports to the mistress of the castle, who is the pig husband's mother in human form. The princess trades the golden objects with her mother-in-law for a night with her son, but the woman gives him milk laced with a sleeping potion. The princess fails on the first two nights, but succeeds on the third.

=== Americas ===
In a French-Missourian variant, Prince Cochon Blanc ("Prince White Pig"), a prince is cursed by a fairy into a swine form by day and human shape by night. He returns to his father, explains the whole story, and his father builds him a stone enclosure. The pig wants to get married, so his father arranges for him marriage with a lady. The pig groom wants to kiss his bride, but she rebuffs him. Enraged, he devours her. This repeats with the second bride, but the third bride is kind and allows it. For her kindness, he shows her his true form at night, as a demonstration of trust. However, she betrays his trust at her mother's insistence, and she is forced to seek him out. One day, she arrives at a kingdom where her Prince White Pig is to be married to another princess, and bribes her with a silk handkerchief, a golden ball and a ring (given by helpful fairies) to spend a few nights with him.

== Opera ==
An opera partly based on the tale, The Enchanted Pig, by the composer Jonathan Dove, was premiered in 2006.

== See also ==
- Animal as Bridegroom
- Cupid and Psyche
- Hans My Hedgehog
- Long, Broad and Sharpsight
- The Feather of Finist the Falcon
- The Golden Crab
- King Crin (Italian fairy tale)
- The Seven Ravens
- The Singing, Springing Lark
- The Three Daughters of King O'Hara
- Trusty John
