= The Enchanted Prince Who was a Hedgehog =

The Enchanted Prince Who was a Hedgehog (Hungarian: Az elátkozott királyfi, aki sündisznó volt) is a Romani-Hungarian folktale collected in Püspökladány, featuring the marriage between a human maiden and a husband in hedgehog guise.

The tale is related to the international cycle of the Animal as Bridegroom or The Search for the Lost Husband: a human maiden marries an animal that is a prince in disguise, breaks a taboo and loses him, and she has to seek him out. The story shares motifs with other tales of the region, like Hungarian The Serpent Prince, Serbian Again, The Snake Bridegroom, and Romanian Trandafiru, The Enchanted Pig and Enchanted Balaur: the heroine must search for her husband under a curse not to bear their child until he touches her again.

== Source ==
The tale was collected from a Hungarian-Romanian source named Gyula Mágai, on January 8th, 1942.

== Translations ==
The tale was also translated to German as Der in einen Igel verzauberte Prinz and as Vom Stachelschwein, das ein verwunschener Prinz war ("About the Porcupine, who was an Enchanted Prince").

== Summary ==
A king and queen wish to have a son in their old age, and suddenly the queen becomes pregnant. She gives birth to a hedgehog, to their shock, but the hedgehog asks to be suckled. After three days, he takes the sheep to graze in the forest, and sees a Turkish king who has lost his way in the woods. The hedgehog prince offers to help him, if he promises his eldest daughter as the animal's wife. A deal is made, and the hedgehog prince later goes to meet the Turkish king in order to cash in on the promise. He marries the elder princess, and they ride a carriage to the castle. When the hedgehog jumps on the bride's lap, she shoos him away, and he kills her for it. Next, the Turkish king goes to church with his wife, and loses his way in the forest again. The hedgehog appears and offers his help, in exchange for marrying the middle princess. It happens thus, and the hedgehog marries the second princess. The girl shoos away the hedgehog, who kills the second princess. Lastly, the Turkish king loses his way in the forest again, and offers his help in exchange for marrying the youngest princess. The Turkish king agrees to a deal, and later marries the princess to the animal. On the road home, the hedgehog jumps on the princess's lap, injuring her. The princess simply takes out her veil and cushions her husband.

Some time later, the princess, Ludinca, becomes pregnant, and the hedgehog prince's mother suspects she is having an affair. Ludinca explains that the hedgehog takes off the porcupine skin at night to become a handsome youth. The mother suggests that she burn the animal skin by heating up an oven later at night. That same night, at midnight, while the prince is asleep, Ludinca gives the animal skin to her mother-in-law for her to burn it. The human hedgehog smells the burning, wakes up and curses his wife not to bear their children unless he places his arm around her three times, but spares his mother of any curse. In return, Ludinca cuts her finger and lets three drops of blood fall on his shirt, for her and no one else to wash it. The hedgehog prince says his name is Rudolf, and vanishes. After two years, Ludinca decides to go after him. She places two hoops around her belly and begins a long journey. She reaches the hut of an old woman, who asks her children, the Star, the Moon, and the Sun, if they saw Rudolf. Only the Sun knows about his location: he is now married to a fairy maiden in a castle beyond the Danube River. The old woman gives Ludinca a golden duck for her to trade it for a night in Rudolf's chambers.

Ludinca goes to the castle market and draws out the golden duck, which the fairy maiden wishes to have. Ludinca trades it for a night in Rudolf's chambers and asks him to touch her, but he lies asleep on his bed due to some morphine the fairy put in his coffee. Failing the first time, the old woman gives Ludinca a golden kettle, which she trades with the fairy maiden for a second night in Rudolf's chambers. Again, he is lying fast asleep, for the fairy maiden has put dream powder in his coffee. The following day, Rudolf goes on a hunt and his second wife's aunt, the Iron-Nosed Witch, offers to join him, despite the fairy's objections. During the hunt, the Iron-Nosed Witch tells him a story about how a hedgehog prince made his way to the castle, and his wife Ludinca tried to wake him up. The old woman next gives Ludinca a golden spindle, for her to trade for a last night in Rudolf's chambers. The last night, Rudolf drops the coffee and waits for Ludinca. Ludinca enters his room and talks to him. He wakes up, embraces her, and she gives birth to two boys playing with golden apples. The following morning, the fairy maiden brings him some coffee, but Rudolf threatens to kill her. The Iron-Nosed Witch begs for the fairy to be spared, and Rudolf takes his wife and children back to his parents' castle, then invites the Turkish king to their wedding.

== Analysis ==
=== Tale type ===
Hungarian scholarship classified the tale as combination of types AaTh 441 and AaTh 425L, a subtype of type 425, "The Search for the Lost Husband". Heinz Mode and József Vekerdi also classified the tale as types 441 and 425. In type 441, a couple wish for a son and a hedgehog is born to them; later, the hedgehog son grows up, helps a king who lost his way in the woods and asks as his reward marriage to one of the princesses; the elder two princesses are rude to him, whom he banishes or kills, and he marries the youngest, who is the only one kind enough to him.

The second part of the tale is classified in the international Aarne-Thompson-Uther Index as type ATU 425A, "The Animal (Monster) as Bridegroom". In this tale type, the princess burns the husband's animal skin and she must seek him out, even paying a visit to the Sun, the Moon and the Wind and gaining their help.

In tale type ATU 425A, the heroine journeys far and wide to encounter her husband, and finds him at the mercy of a second spouse. The supernatural husband, now human, is put to sleep by the magic potion of the second spouse, so that the heroine has no chance of rescuing him.

=== Motifs ===
József Vekerdi suggested that the couple's names, Rudolf and Ludinca, which are a "known" Hungarian couple's name, were "a literary reminiscence".

==== The hedgehog husband ====
Polish philologist Mark Lidzbarski noted that the pig prince usually appears in Romance language tales, while the hedgehog as the animal husband occurs in Germanic and Slavic tales. Also, according to Swedish folklorist Waldemar Liungman and Christine Shojaei Kawan (in Enzyklopädie des Märchens), in type ATU 441 the animal husband may be a hedgehog, a wild boar or a porcupine. The Grimms' notes state that in these fairy tales, "Hedgehog, porcupine, and pig are here synonymous, like Porc and Porcaril". According to Hungarian scholar Ágnes Kovács, in Magyar Néprajzi Lexikon ("Hungarian Ethnographic Dictionary"), in Hungary, the son is born due to the rash desire of their mother in the shape of an animal, appearing like a snake, a pig, a hound or a foal (in type 425), or the poor old couple adopts the first animal that appears in their way: a hedgehog (in type 441).

==== The heroine's helpers ====
According to Hans-Jörg Uther, the main feature of tale type ATU 425A is "bribing the false bride for three nights with the husband". In fact, when he developed his revision of Aarne-Thompson's system, Uther remarked that an "essential" trait of the tale type ATU 425A was the "wife's quest and gifts" and "nights bought".

In a study published posthumously, Romanian folklorist Petru Caraman noted that, in Romanian and in some South Slavic variants, instead of meeting the Sun, the Moon and the Wind on the way to her husband, the heroine finds incarnations of the days of the week, like Holy Wednesday and Holy Friday. They function the same as the elements and gift the heroine with golden objects. Also, according to Hungarian scholar Ágnes Kovács, the heroine's helpers are three old ladies: the mother of the Sun, the mother of the Moon and the Mother of the Wind in Hungarian variants, and Holy Friday, Holy Saturday and Holy Sunday in Romania.

==== The heroine's pregnancy ====
In Balkanic variants of the international tale type, the supernatural husband curses his wife not to give birth to their child for a long period of time until she finds him again. In addition, according to Lithuanian professor Bronislava Kerbelyte, similar tales from Hungary, Romania and Moldova contain the motif of the supernatural husband wrapping iron hoops around the heroine's belly so she cannot give birth to their child until he lays a hand on her again.

In this regard, Hungarian scholar Ákos Dömötör, in the 1988 revised edition of the Hungarian Folktale Catalogue, separated this motif under a second typing indexed as AaTh 425L, Abroncs a Testen ("Rings on Body"): the husband places iron rings around the heroine's body so she is unable to give birth until he touches her again. Despite its own typing, Dömötör remarked that it is "identical" to type AaTh 425A (see above).

==== The gifts from the helpers ====
According to Hans-Jörg Uther, the main feature of tale type ATU 425A is "bribing the false bride for three nights with the husband". In fact, when he developed his revision of Aarne-Thompson's system, Uther remarked that an "essential" trait of the tale type ATU 425A was the "wife's quest and gifts" and "nights bought". In the same vein, according to Hungarian scholar Ágnes Kovács, in Magyar Néprajzi Lexikon ("Hungarian Ethnographic Dictionary"), the heroine is cursed by her husband not to bear their children until he touches her again. In her search for him, she passes by the houses of the Mothers of the Sun, of the Moon and of the Wind (or Holy Friday, Holy Saturday and Holy Sunday), where she gains (golden) apparatuses: a distaff, a spindle, and a bobbin, which she uses to trade for a night in the prince's chambers.

== Variants ==
According to Hungarian scholarship, ethnographer Janos Berze Nágy dubbed type AaTh 425A in Hungary as Kígyóvőlegény ("The Serpent Bridegroom"), due to the serpent appearing in 12 of 26 variants available in his lifetime. Similarly, according to Hungarian folklorist Ágnes Kovács, most of the Hungarian variants about an animal bridegroom involve the serpent prince (tale type AaTh 425A).

Dégh stated that she analysed some 40 Hungarian variants of type ATU 425A and concluded that the "Hungarian ethnic redaction" of the type "always" featured the snake as the supernatural husband. In a later study, Dégh claimed that the Hungarian ethnic redaction was "remarkably consistent": the snake is the animal bridegroom "in all cases", barring a few variants wherein the supernatural bridegroom is a pig or a dog.

=== The Hedgehog and the Princess ===
In a Romani tale titled A sündisznó meg a királylány ("The Hedgehog and the Princess"), collected from Nagyszalonta from a source named Sebőkné Hajkai Gizella, an old gypsy couple, man and woman, live on the edge of the village. One day, the woman orders her husband to bring something for them to eat. The man goes to the forest and fetches some firewood, when a hedgehog appears to him. He tries to kick away the animal, but it keeps following the man. The gypsy man sees the hedgehog behind him and threatens to cook him when he comes home. The man brings the little animal in, saying it is part of their family, and his wife complains that the hedgehog looks meagre, but they can fatten it up. Thus, they place the animal under the stove. At night, the hedgehog begins to talk, thanking the couple for taking him in and asking them to court the king's daughter for him. The old gypsy man questions the animal's idea, but decides to try since he begs for bread there. The following morning, the man goes to talk to the king about the hedgehog's proposal, and the king asks to see his son, since he knows the man has no children. The morning after, the old gypsy man brings the hedgehog and introduces him as his son. The king sends for his daughter to ask her about the old man's ridiculous proposal, but the princess actually wants to marry the little animal if that is the bridegroom God intended for her. The king laughs at his daughter's idea, but his face soon falls as he realizes the girl is serious, then orders her to be thrown in the pigsty with her animal husband, and to be given no food or drink.

The princess cries for her fate and even pushes the hedgehog away when he tries to comfort her due to his quills. The queen sends her provisions through the servants, and the princess shares it with the hedgehog. One night, the hedgehog removes his skin and quills and reveals himself as a handsome man that illuminates the whole pigsty. The man tells the princess that he is a king's son, cursed into that form until the curse is lifted. Later, the princess wishes to speak to her mother after her father leaves, and a servant calls for the queen. The queen goes to converse with her daughter, and the princess points to the hedgehog, saying he is a handsome youth unlike anyone in the world, and that removes his skin at midnight, so she says she will make a hole in the pigsty, place the hedgehog skin through the opening for her mother to fetch and burn it in the oven. The following night, the prince comes out of the animal skin, spends the night with the princess and goes to sleep. While he is dozing off, the princess sends the skin to her mother, who burns it in the oven. As the animal skin crackles in the fire, the entire castle crumbles with it. The hedgehog youth wakes up, notices the princess's betrayal, says he had only one more night, then curses her for twelve shackles to hoop around her body, for her not to bear any children until he places a hand on her and caresses her three times, but she would come to him even if he was at the end of the world. The hedgehog prince then departs.

The princess has twelve hoops around her belly, so her pregnancy is impeded. She travels through seven lands and seven kingdom. Suddenly, an old woman appears before her, in whom she confides about her situation. The old woman tells her about a nearby kingdom where a widowed queen has a daughter who goes to church with the husband she has just married, and bids the princess talk to her if the man she is looking for, her husband, is at the church. The following morning, the wind blows very hard, so the pregnant princess curses the wind to the Devil. The old woman appears again and says she is the wind, so the princess apologizes to her. The princess confirms her husband is there, to the old woman-wind gives her a silver spindle that spins silver threads, for her to draw the cook or the local queen's attention and trade it for a night with the prince. The princess does as instructed and the queen tells her daughter about it, so a deal is made. However, the queen dowses the prince's drink with some dream powder to make him sleep. The pregnant princess goes to talk to the prince, begging him to touch her belly and allow her to give birth, to no avail. A servant called Hamupepejka spies the whole exchange since he is hidden in a closet in the prince's room.

The second day, the wind-woman gives the princess a golden spindle that spins golden threads, which she trades for a night in the prince's quarters, and once again she cannot wake him up. The third day, the wind-woman gives the princess a diamond spindle that spins diamond threads. Hamupepejka informs the prince about the woman crying over him at night for two nights now, but the prince does not react since the queen gave him a dream powder. The prince promises to execute Hamupepejka is lying, but bathe him in milk if it is the truth. Back to the princess, she spins the diamond threads and the queen becomes so impressed she says she needs the object, so the princess trades it with the queen for a night with the prince. The prince is given some food laced with the dream powder, but he exchanges the dishes so that the queen eats it and falls asleep. The prince pretends to be asleep and waits for his true wife. The princess enters the room and cries over him, since the wind-woman told her this was the last night. The prince wakes up and says his wife would come to him even if he was at the end of the world, so he touches her to release the hoops around her body. The hoops fall apart with so much fire that the entire castle turns to dust. The prince and the princess return to their kingdom and rule the realm after the deaths of her parents.

=== Pig Prince (Kibed) ===
In a Romani tale titled Malackirályfi ("Pig Prince"), collected in Kibed from a source named Karácsony József, an old couple, man and woman, live alone, and worry that they do not have anyone to live with them. At one time, the old woman goes to the fields, finds a piglet, a little hedgehog, which she takes home to be their son. One night, the little animal walks before them, removes the porcine skin, and becomes a prince. The human prince says he is human, but he was cursed to walk in pigskin for seven years, and orders the old man to court the local king's youngest daughter as his bride, lest he destroys the whole country. The old man arranges a wedding between the pig son and the princess. In the morning, the prince puts on the pigskin again, so the old woman tells the princess they should get rid of the animal skin by preparing a cauldron with coals. They go to bed that same night, and the old woman says the coals are ready, so they take the pigskin and burn it. In the morning, the prince wakes up and cannot find the pigskin, so he goes to the garden, takes a dry hazel twig and brings it to their room, then tells his wife to look after him when the dry hazel twig turns green and bears fruit and she brings its fruits when she finds him. So he turns into a dove and flies away. After the prince vanishes, the princess waters the dried twig for some time, it sprouts and yields fruits she plucks, then goes in search of him. The princess travels far and wide and knocks on the door to Mrs. Friday ("Péntek"), an old woman, who summons all the birds in the world with a whistle to discern the location of the princess's husband, but no bird has seen him. Before the princess leaves, Friday gives her a golden self-moving distaff that spins golden threads by itself. The princess travels to the house of Mother Saturday ("Szombát"), another old woman, who summons the birds for another conference, and still they do not know where the Pig Prince is. Mother Saturday gives the princess a silver bobbin that produces silver threads. Lastly, the princess reaches the house of Mother Sunday ("Vasárnap", in the original), who summons all the birds in the world. All birds come, save one latecomer: the griffin, which explains it flew from Pig Prince's kingdom with a broken wing. Mother Sunday advises the animal to douse its wing with the living and dead water, and gives the princess a golden hen with golden chicks. Mother Sunday asks the griffin to carry the princess, and the bird ferries her to the end of the world. When they land, the princess sits in front of the castle and takes out the golden spindle, which draws out the attention of the local queen. The monarch wishes to have the marvellous object, and the princess trades it for a night in the prince's chambers. The queen gives him some dream-wine so he falls asleep, and she cannot wake him up. On the second day, the princess takes out the silver bobbin which the queen wishes to have and trades it for allowing the stranger to spend a night in the prince's chambers. She gives him some dream-wine again and he cannot be woken up by the princess. On the third day, a servant named hamuhutyka goes to inform the prince about a girl that comes to his bed at night and cries over his sleeping body, mentioning she brought the fruits of the dried hazel twig, and reveals the prince is given a dream-wine. The prince avoids drinking the potion that night, and the princess, his true wife, trades the golden hen with chicks for a last night in his chambers. The princess cries over him, but this time he wakes up. They reunite and embrace each other. The Pig Prince kills the person who drugged him with the dream-wine, and he rules with his wife over seven countries.

=== Magic Miska ===
In a Romani tale collected from eighty-one year old informant Béla Rostás, in Debrecen, with the title Tündér Miska ("Magic Miska"), an old man goes to hunt some hares, and wanders the world for seven years. After failing to shoot any game, he finds some pig tracks on the ground and finds a three-month-old piglet with golden skin. The man takes the pig home with him. At night, the pig begins to talk and tells the man he will leave silver coins in a basket for him to court the king's daughter on his behalf. The old peasant goes to court the king's daughter, but the monarch expels him by siccing the dogs on him. The old man returns home and informs the golden pig. The pig advises him to take a basket of golden coins. The following morning, the old man takes the golden coins to the king, but he is still harsh to the old peasant, so he orders to have the pig suitor by morning the following day. By morning, the peasant man's hovel has turned into a golden house spinning on chicken legs, with a golden lake next to the king's courtyard and golden birds in teh water. The princess leans on the windowsill, sees the pig and declares she wants to be married to him, lest she kills herself. The king summons musicians and arranges a wedding for her and the pig. The pig marries the princess and both retire to their chambers. He removes his pigskin and turns into Magic Miska, the king's chief minister. He kisses his wife and goes to sleep. However, the Iron-Nosed witch takes the pigskin and throws it into the fire. The following morning, Magic Miska cannot find the pigskin, and tells his wife he will depart to his home, beyond the Glass Castle and the Glass Mountain, between the clouds and amidst the great peaks in the sky. He vanishes. The princess, called Amálika, feels she is pregnant and decides to go after her husband, since she cannot give birth to her children until he has embraced her waist three times. She travels far and wide for seven years and reaches the hut of the Queen of the Stars, who asks her children, the stars, if they saw Magic Miska. Due to a negative response, Amálika continues on her journey and reaches, after another seven years, the Mother of the Sun, who asks her children about Magic Miska, and still no response. After a third journey of seven years, she arrives at the hut of the ruler of the birds. She says the birds are her children, and a lame man appears, saying he knows Magic Miska: he shot his leg. The ruler of the birds orders the lame man to guide the princess to Magic Miska's palace. He does so, and Amálika reaches the courtyard. She asks the local queen if she can sleep in Magic Miska's room for three nights. For the first two nights, the Magic Miska is asleep, due to drinking some wine laced with sleep-dust. Princess Amálika begs over her sleeping husband's body, asking him to wake up and touch her to she can give birth to his two sons. On the third night, the coachman overhears the conversation and advices Magic Miska about not drinking the drugged wine. On the third night, the prince pretends to be asleep as Amálika cries over him. He wakes up and embraces her, causing their children, two golden children, to be born. Magic Miska locks his wife and sons for protection, while he summons prince, king and barons. However, his mother-in-law, an Iron-Nosed Witch, slips through the keyhole and slits the children's throats, smears the knife in the large pool of their blood and places it near Amálika's pillow to blame her. Magic Miska returns to the chambers and discovers the dead children and the knee-deep pool of blood. The Iron-Nosed Witch accuses princess Amálika of killing her children and tells them to find the knife. Magic Miska believes that Amálika killed her children. The nobles grab her, sever her arms up to the shoulders, tie the dead children to her back and expel her into the world. Amálika walks naked through the forest and finds God Himself. God tells her to untie the children and lay them down; by doing so, Amálika's arms are restored, while God revives the twin children, both called Tündér Miska. A residence appears in the forest to house the children and their mother, and they live there. There is a school nearby, where the twin sons study. Back to Magic Miska, he takes a carriage and rides up north. He finds the golden palace and decides to visit it. Princess Amálika recognizes Magic Miska, who does not recognize her, and welcomes him and the coachman. They go to sleep at night in the same room. While Magic Miska is asleep, his hand slips off from the bed, and Amálika tells one of the twin sons to place it near his father's body. The coachman overhears the words. The following night, as everyone goes to sleep, the coachman tells Magic Miska to dangle his foot from the bed, for the princess and the children are his family. Magic Miska does so, and Amálika tells her sons to help their father. By doing so, Magic Miska recognizes his sons and embraces them. The family then takes the carriage and drive to their kingdom. However, the Iron-Nosed Witch appears to block their path, turns into a turkey and tries to attack the carriage. The boys point to the witch and recognize her as their killer. Magic Miska has an iron chest made, then slices the Iron-Nosed Witch, locks the chest and throws it in the fiery sea. He then invites kings, dukes and barons to his and Amálika's grand wedding.

=== The Pigboy ===
Hungarian ethnographer Oszkár Mailand collected a Hungarian tale from Szováta, in Székely. In this tale, titled Disznóficzkó ("The Pigboy"), an old woman earns her living by spinning. She spins threads of gold, silver and diamond, and gives to the queen. Later, the old woman's pig son tells her to go to the royal couple and ask for the princess's hand in marriage. The king hears the marriage proposal, but first orders tasks for his daughter's suitor: to break a rock, build a vineyard, and have freshly squeezed wine and a bowl of grapes on the king's table by morning. The pigboy summons all devils and people from hell and fulfills the task. The next task is to build a diamond road between the king's palace and the pigboy's house, with many fruitful trees along the path, in many states of ripening, and a diamond well in the middle of the road. The pig suitor fulfills the task and marries the princess in church. The princess goes to the old woman's poor house and is given a bed of straw to lie on. That night, the pig suitor becomes a prince and tells his wife not to reveal the secret for three more days. They spend the night together and she is pregnant. On the third night, the princess tells her mother-in-law that the pig becomes a prince. While the couple are asleep, the old woman takes the pigskin and tosses it in the oven. The man awakens and waits by the door for his wife to awaken. After she does, he goes to embrace her, and places two iron rings around her belly, which he explains will only come off when he touches her again. Then he becomes a dove and flies away. The princess asks her father to commission iron shoes and iron canes, and begins her quest. She passes by the Holy Monday (Szent-Hétfő), Holy Tuesday (Szent-Keddhez), Holy Wednesday (Szent-Szereda), Holy Thursday (Szent-Csütörtök), Holy Friday (Szent-Pentek), Holy Saturday (Szent-Szombat) and Holy Sunday (Szent-Vasárnap) - which are referred to as male entities in this tale -, but only Holy Sunday, by summoning all devils of the world, has any idea about her husband's location. The little devil takes the princess to a valley, and tells her husband is sleeping in a diamond palace down in the valley. The princess enters the palace and goes to his room: he sleeps chained with a golden chain to the golden bed. The princess cries out to him and he awakens. He embraces her, the iron rings come off of her body and she gives birth to a golden-haired boy. Then they turn into three doves, fly up to the sky and become a star.

=== The Pig King ===
In a Hungarian tale collected from a Csangó source in Gajcsána with the title Disznyókirály ("The Pig King"), three princesses discern about their futures, and the youngest learns she is to marry a pig king, to her sadness. They do not report the incident to the monarch. Some time later, the suitors fate has allotted them begin to appear: the king of the East appears to marry the elder princess, and so does the king of the West to marry the middle daughter. Lastly, a beautiful silver carriage appears to bring the third suitor: the Pig King, who has come for the youngest princess. A priest officiates their marriage, and the pig enters the carriage covered with mud, but the princess wipes it off. When they reach their marital home, the Pig King removes the porcine skin to become a handsome youth at night, but dons it again in the morning. A few days later, the princess's mother pays her daughter a visit and is told about the Pig King's transformation, so she convinces the princess to take the skin while her husband is asleep and burn it. At night, the princess takes the porcine skin and tosses it in the oven, but the smell alerts the king, who wakes up to ask the princess about his pigskin. The princess denies everything, but the Pig King tells her he would have three days more to end his curse, admonishes her for the action and tells her to wear down a pair of iron shoes, curses her not to bear their children until he lays a hand on her again, and departs. The princess commissions the iron apparel and begins her journey: she passes by the forest houses of Szëm Péntek (Holy Friday), where she gains a golden "guzsájt" and a golden spool, of Szën Szombat (Holy Saturday), where she gains a "gërëbën" (comb), and of Szën Vasárnap (Holy Sunday). Holy Sunday controls the birds, welcomes the princess into her house, and summons her avian subjects to discern the Pig King's location. Most of the assembled birds do not know, save for a latecomer lark, which knows where Pig King is and says he spends his days hunting. The princess thanks the lark and goes to her husband's new home, reaches a well and takes out the golden objects to draw attention. A maidservant is fetching water when she sees the princess with the golden instruments and informs her mistress, the Pig King's new wife, a Gypsy. The princess trades the objects for a night in Pig King's chambers and tries to wake him up on the first two nights, begging him to touch her, but the Gypsy wife has given him a sleeping wine. The Pig King notices in the morning that his pillow is soaked. On the final night, the princess trades a golden hen with chicks Holy Sunday has given her and bribes for a third night in the Pig King's quarters. The human Pig King returns from the hunt, remembers his previous wife, and avoids drinking the wine the Gypsy wife offers him. He lies on his bed when the princess comes to beg him to touch her body. He wakes up and places his hand on her body, allowing their children to be born: golden-haired children. The Gypsy woman appears to scold the crying babies, but the Pig King locks her up, then lives in the palace with his true wife and children.

=== Green Pig (Csóngrad) ===
In a Hungarian tale collected from a teller named Palásti Annuska in Csongrád with the title Zöld disznó ("Green Pig"), a king has three daughters, Rozika, Mariska, and Erzsike. One day, he tells them he will go to the fair, and asks which presents he can bring them: the elder asks for a flame-coloured dress, the middle one for a sky-blue dress and Erszike for smiling grapes and peaches. The king finds the dresses, but not the smiling fruits. One day, he is traversing the forest when he loses his way in the woods. The monarch promises t marry his daughter to anyone that can save him, and a pig appears to him, who carries the king's carriage out of the mud. Some time later, the green pig appears at the king's palace doors and demands his bride, per their arrangement, otherwise he will burn the palace. Erszike agrees to go with the animal to spare her father, and the green pig takes her on the wheelbarrow to his barn, the girl crying all the way. She sleeps on a straw bed and cries herself to sleep. When she wakes up, she finds herself not in a barn, but in a grand palace, with a handsome prince next to her - it is the green pig, with the green pig skin lying on the floor. They live together like this, with the prince removing the pigskin at night. The princess wants to destroy the pigskin, so her mother convinces her to place some coals on a pan next to the bed and kick the animal disguise the next time he removes it. It happens thus, and the green pigskin is burnt in the coals. THe prince wakes up, says he must depart now, for he is a cursed youth, then cuts off his finger to smear his own shirt, saying that only she can wash the bloodstains, which will make him know she is nearby,. He also curses Erszike not to bear their child until he places a hand on her again, then vanishes. Erszike goes to an old aunt in search of advice, and the old woman tells her to search for her husband. Thus, the princess starts a long journey beyond seven mountains and near the Óperenciás Sea. She finally reaches the house of the mother of the Sun and her son, the Sun, which have not seen the Green Pig, but the Sun's mother gives the princess a golden spindle and sends her on her way. Next, she reaches the house of the mother of the Moon and her son, the Moon, which have also not seen the Green Pig. The mother of the Moon gives the princess a second golden spindle. Lastly, she reaches the house of the Mother of the Wind and the Wind, which has seen her husband. The mother of the Wind gives her a third golden spindle and sends the Wind and the princess on her way. The Wind carries the princess to a stream, where washerwomen are trying to wash a shirt stained with blood that belongs to a prince, who promised a reward to whoever can wash it off. The princess asks to try washing the shirt, but the washerwomen dismiss her for she is pregnant. Still, she takes out a golden spindle and trades it for a night in the castle's "echo palace", which is the room next to the prince's chambers. She cannot wake him up on the first night, since he was given "the honey of sleep". The following morning, the princess asks to try washing the shirt and removes the blood. A washerwoman goes to report to the king, who knows that his wife is nearby, and also about a crying woman's voice, so he promises not to drink the honey of sleep to talk to her. However, he had drunk it the night before and falls asleep, when Erszike goes to talk to him a second time after trading a second spindle. The king avoids drinking the honey of sleep a third time, just as Erszike trades the last golden spindle and reaches his room. The king talks to Erszike and takes her to his chambers, then touches her, allowing her to give birth to two golden-haired sons. The king then tells his wife they shall live in the palace, in that kingdom.

== See also ==
- The Serpent Prince
- The Enchanted Pig
- Hans My Hedgehog
- The Pig King
- King Crin
- Hedgehog Son
- The Story of King Pig
