= King Crin =

Italian fairy tale from Piedmont

King Crin (Italian: La storia del Re Crin) is an Italian fairy tale collected by Antonio Arietti. Italian author Italo Calvino reworked the tale as King Crin in his work Italian Folktales.

The tale is related to the international cycle of the Animal as Bridegroom or The Search for the Lost Husband, wherein a human maiden marries a prince cursed to be an animal, loses him and has to search for him. According to scholars, the pig or swine as the form of the cursed husband is very popular in Italy.

== Sources ==
Calvino sourced the tale from Monteu da Po, Piedmont.

== Summary ==
A king has a pig for a son, named King Crin. One day, he oinks that he wants a human wife, one of the baker's daughters. The baker's elder daughter is convinced of marrying the pig, and they celebrate the wedding. The pig prince, however, wanders through town to play in the mud, and returns to the palace to meet his wife in their wedding chambers. He jumps on the bed to caress her, and ends up dirtying her dress. The girl tries to shoo him away in disgust, and the pig threatens her. The next morning, she is found dead.

King Crin decides to marry again, this time to the baker's middle daughter. Again, befitting his porcine appearance, he dirties himself in mudpits around the city and goes back to his wife in their chambers. Once again, he dirties her dress, she complains about it, and he kills her for it.

Finally, the baker's youngest daughter marries the pig, treating him with kindness despite the pig's behaviour, and survives the night. One night, however, she lights a taper to better see her husband, and finds on her bedside a handsome youth instead of the pig. She then accidentally drops the taper on his body and he wakes up. King Crin then admonishes his wife, saying she will only find him after filling seven jars with tears, and wearing out seven pairs of iron shoes, seven iron hats and seven iron mantles, then vanishes.

The girl decides to go after her husband: after she sheds tears to fill the jars, she commissions the iron garments to begin her quest. She passes by the house of the Wind ('Vent', in the original) and its mother, and is given a chestnut. She next goes to the house of the Lightning ('Losna', in the original) and its mother, and is given a walnut, and lastly to the house of the Thunder ('Tron', in the original) and its mother, and gains a hazelnut.

At the end of her wanderings, she reaches a city where the now human King Crin is set to be married to the local princess. Following the advice of the mothers of the elements, she cracks open the nuts to find valuable items inside: the chestnut reveals gems and diamonds, the walnut produces gowns and silks; and the hazelnut yields horses and carriages. For three days, the girl bribes the local princess with the exquisite gifts so she can spend a night with her husband. She gives the gems and diamonds to the princess, who gives King Crin a sleeping potion and he cannot react to his true wife's tearful pleas. The situation repeats on the second night. On the third night, King Crin pretends to be asleep, and secretly listens to his wife's pleas. He wakes up and recognizes her, and they both go home.

== Analysis ==
=== Tale type ===
Philologist Gianfranco D'Aronco classified the tale as Italian type 425, Lo sposo scomparso ("The Lost Husband"). The Italian type corresponds, in the international Aarne-Thompson-Uther Index, to type ATU 425, "The Search for the Lost Husband". More specifically, it is classified as subtype ATU 425A, "The Animal (Monster) as Bridegroom": the princess burns the husband's animal skin and she must seek him out, even paying a visit to the Sun, the Moon and the Wind and gaining their help. The heroine is given marvellous objects on the way to her husband by the personifications of the elements, or by her helpers, and she uses them to bribe the false bride for a night with him. Only on the third night the heroine manages to talk to her husband and he recognizes her.

=== Motifs ===
According to Hans-Jörg Uther, the main feature of tale type ATU 425A is "bribing the false bride for three nights with the husband". In fact, when he developed his revision of Aarne-Thompson's system, Uther remarked that an "essential" trait of the tale type ATU 425A was the "wife's quest and gifts" and "nights bought".

==== The animal husband ====
Polish philologist Mark Lidzbarski noted that the pig prince usually appears in Romance language tales, while the hedgehog as the animal husband occurs in Germanic and Slavic tales.

Calvino noted that "the folktale about the swine king is one of the most widespread in Italy". A similar opinion was given by Letterio di Francia: he concluded that in many Italian variants the prince is either transformed into a serpent or is an enchanted pig. Likewise, Swedish scholar Jan-Övjind Swahn stated that the swine as the form of the enchanted husband is "traditional" in Italy. In turn, according to Greek folklorist Georgios A. Megas's quantitative analysis, among the many forms of the enchanted husband in Italian variants, he appears as a serpent in 11 tales and as a pig in 10 texts. In the same vein, according to Gian Paolo Caprettini's Dizionario della fiaba italiana, in type 425, La ricerca dello sposo scomparso ("The Search for the Lost Husband"), in the Italian variants, the enchanted husband can assume a crab form or a pig form, although the latter is more prevalent.

== Variants ==
=== Italy ===
==== About King Pig ====
In a Sicilian variant collected by Laura Gonzenbach, Vom Re Porco ("About King Pig"), a queen wishes for a son, even if it is a pig, and thus one is born. Years later, the pig son wants to marry. He marries three times: the first two times, after the marriage, he plays in the mud and tries to climb onto the bride's lap, but she rejects him. On the wedding night, the pig prince takes off his skin, becomes a handsome human prince and kills his wife. With the third bride, she accepts the dirty bridegroom and her life is spared on her wedding night. She also learns her husband is an enchanted prince and must not reveal the truth to anyone. However, she tells the queen and her pig husband disappears. The princess, then, is forced to seek him out in a distant kingdom. On her journey, she meets three old hermits, who give her a hazelnut, a nut and an almond. Finally, the princess reaches the foreign queen's realm, and cracks open the hermits' presents: first, she finds a golden hen with golden chicks; next, she finds a golden toy schoolgirl and pupils; lastly, a golden eagle. The girl uses the golden objects to buy three nights in her husband's bed.

==== The Prince with the Pigskin ====
In a Venetian variant, Der Prinz mit der Schweinshaut ("The Prince with the Pigskin"), an evil sorceress curses a neighbouring king so that his wife gives birth to "a prince wearing a pigskin". He marries two princesses who insult him when he dries off his body with their bridal dress and he kills them for it. He marries the third princess, who does not seen to mind his drying off his body with her dress. This pleases the pig prince, who lets her see his true form, in exchange for her keeping the secret. When they attend a tournament the next day, the Queen Mother notices the handsome man by her daughter-in-law's side and thinks it is not her son. Soon, the queen confronts the princess, who is forced to reveal the truth to her mother-in-law and the location of the pig prince's pigskin. The queen takes the pigskin from the ashbox and burns it, causing the prince to disappear. The princess goes on a quest to rescue him, by meeting the Stella d'Oro ("Abendstern"), the Sun and the Wind. She gains from each a hazelnut, a nut and an almond. The princess hires herself as a goose herd for a second spouse, and cracks opens the nuts: she finds a dress "the colour of the Stella d'Oro" in the first; a dress the colour of the sun in the second, and "an even more beautiful dress" in the third. The princess uses the three dresses to bribe for three nights with her husband.

==== The Pig King (Florence) ====
Author Vittorio Imbriani collected a tale from Florence with the title Il Re Porco ("The Pig King"). In this tale, a pregnant queen walks to a terrace for a bit of fresh air, when she insults a passing beggar woman by calling her a swine. In return, the woman curses the queen to give birth to a pig. A prince is born, in the shape of a pig, and the queen realizes it was the beggar woman's fault. The pig prince grows up and, when he is older, wants to be married. One day, he sees a mugolio's three daughters, and falls in love with one of them. The mugolio is told of the prince's wishes and asks his daughter which will want to marry the pig: the youngest and the middle daughter refuse to do so, while the elder agrees. The pig and the girl marry in a ceremony, and, in their bedchambers, the prince takes off his pigskin to become a handsome youth. His wife is surprised at this turn of events, but the youth asks her not to tell his mother, since his porcine appearance is due to her arrogance during the pregnancy. The girl promises the youth not to tell anyone, but, the next morning, the queen pesters her for details and she blabs about it. The same night, the pig prince chastises his wife for betraying his secret, and kills her. This happens again with the second sister. The pig marries the third sister and shows her his true form, asking her not to tell his mother. The next morning, the third sister tries to keep quiet about her husband's secret, but she tells the queen and asks her not to tell a soul about it. The same night, the pig youth admonishes his wife, but, instead of killing her, says she will only find him after she wears down seven iron canes, seven iron dresses and seven pairs of iron shoes, and fill seven jugs with tears. He kisses his mother goodbye and departs. The girl goes after him, and meets three old woman on the road, each giving her a gift (a nut, a hazelnut, and an almond) and some advice: cracking open the nuts and bribing her husband's second bride, a queen, with its objects for a night with the human pig prince. The girl finally wears out the seven iron garments and reaches a palace. She cracks open the nuts and finds three "galanterie" which she uses to bribe for three nights with her husband. She fails on the first two nights, but manages it on the third, by recounting her journey to make him remember (in her verses, she calls herself "Son Ginevra bella"). The pig prince wakes up, since he put a sleeping potion in his second bride's drink, and orders his servants to bring all his riches to back to his mother's castle. His orders are carried out and the pig prince returns to his mother's palace with his wife in tow. Back to the second bride, she wakes up and notices that the castle is empty from top to bottom, releases a loud scream and falls dead.

==== The Pig King (Pratovecchio) ====
Italian folklorist Giuseppe Pitrè collected a tale from Pratovecchio, Tuscany, with the title Il re porco. In this tale, a king and queen have a son with the face of a pig. When he is 18 years old, he wants to get married, but no maiden wishes to be his bride. One day, he finds a suitable bride for him: the elder daughter of a calzolaio. The pig prince marries the elder daughter and, during the celebration, he sploshes in the mud and dirties his bride's dress. The girl complains and is killed for it on their wedding night. The same events happen to the middle daughter of the calzolaio. Finally, the man's youngest daughter agrees to marry the pig prince, and she treats the porcine bridegroom with kindness. In return, he spares her life. They live together, and the pig prince asks his wife not to tell anyone that he becomes a handsome youth at night. Despite promising so, the girl tells the king the truth about the prince. That same night, the prince chastises his wife, and says she will never find him unless she fills seven jars with tears and wears down seven pairs of iron shoes, seven dresses and seven hats, and departs. The girl cries for the loss of her husband, then begins her journey. She passes by the house of the Vento di sotto and his wife. The Vento di sotto cannot help her, so he gives her a hazelnut and directs her to his cousin, the wind Liofante (which Pitrè understood to mean Levante, that is, from the East). The girl next reaches the house of Liofante and his wife, who also cannot help him, so she is directed to his brother, the Ponente ('Sunset Wind') and is given an almond. Lastly, she arrives at the house of Ponente and his wife, who tell her the prince has married another wife, a queen, and gives her a nut. The Ponente also takes her to the city where the queen lives. The girl cracks open the nuts and finds a golden trousseau (corredo da bambini) in the first, then a corredo for older children, and finally a corredo for a pregnant woman. She uses the three objects to bribe for three nights in her husband's bed, failing on the first two and waking him up on the third.

==== The Pig King (Dalmatia) ====
Author and journalist Riccardo Forster collected and published a Dalmatian Italian tale titled El Re Porco. In this tale, a king and a queen fervently wish to have a son. After many prayers, one is born to them: a pig, to the queen's great distress. The pig grows up and asks his mother fo find him a wife. The queen herself questions his intentions, since who would want to marry a pig? Despite her reservations, she finds a poor tailor ('sartor', in the original) with three daughters. The queen sends for the tailor about the prospect of marriage between their families. At first, the man is hesitant, but agrees to his elder daughter's marriage to the pig prince. After the wedding ceremony, the pig prince goes to the wedding chambers to meet his wife, but, since he has rolled in the mud during the day, he dirties the bride's clothes. The girl shoos away the pig prince, and he kills her. After a while, the pig prince asks his mother to find him another wife. She does: the tailor's middle daughter, who marries the pig prince, shoos him away on the wedding night, and is killed in retaliation. Lastly, the pig prince asks a third time for a bride, and the queen brings him the tailor's youngest daughter. Before the girl leaves, her mother reminds her to burn the pigskin after the prince is asleep. The youngest daughter marries the prince and follows her mother's suggestion, but the pig prince disappears. The girl begins a quest for him around the world with three pairs of iron shoes and an iron cane. On the road, she meets an old man, who does not the location of the King Pig's palace, but directs her to another old man and gives her a nut ('nosa'). She keeps on her journey and meets another old man, who gives her another nut ('nosella') and finally a third old man, who gives her an almond nut ('mandola'). The third old man tells the girl the King Pig has married another woman, and now lives in a grand palace. The girl finishes her quest by wearing down the seven pairs of iron shoes, until she reaches King Pig's palace, and finds work there. One day, she cracks open the first nut and finds a beautiful dress, which she uses to trade with the queen for one night in King Pig's chambers. She tries to wake him up, but the tale says he was asleep "like a pig". Some time later, she cracks open the second nut, which contains a sea-coloured dress, and she trades it for a second night in King Pig's quarters. Once again, he fails to wake up. Desperate that she failed twice, the girl breaks open the almond nut, and finds a sky-coloured dress, which she trades for a third night in his chambers. At last, King Pig wakes up and is told everything by his first wife. The King Pig chastises the queen, saying that by selling him she cannot be his wife, and goes back with the girl.

==== The Pig King (Marche) ====
Author Rachel Harriette Busk collected an Italian tale from Marche with the title Il re porco ("The Pig King"). In this tale, a king's son is transformed into a pig by a female enemy of the king. Despite the porcine transformation, the prince's mother, the queen, can still read his wishes, and surmises he wants to be married. Knowing that no girl of noble descent will want to marry him, so she resorts to a girl of low station. She finds a baker with three daughters, and marries the eldest to the pig son. They move out to a newly built palace, and the pig prince approaches his bride while he is dirty with mud. The girl shoos him away, and he, in retaliation, he jumps on her, killing her. This repeats with the baker's second daughter. Their sister, the baker's youngest daughter, named Doralice, offers to marry the pig prince. Her friends comment with her about the situation, but Doralice replies he was a kind prince before the curse, and she could never blame him for it. The queen summons her after learning of her true feeling, and marries her to the prince. On the wedding night, Doralice embraces the pig prince, and, due to her love for him, he turns back into a human prince. Despite the good news, the human prince asks her to keep the secret between them, lest their enemy learns of this. For months, Doralice manages to remain quiet about the secret, and the prince lives as a pig during the day and human by night. One day, however, she pays a visit to her father, who has a guest with him: a spurned suitor to Doralice. The man mocks Doralice for marrying a pig, but she answers that, by marrying the pig, she saved him. On telling this, the pig prince disappears, and Doralice tries to find him. The pig prince appears to her and says the evil princess has him under her power, but Doralice can find him by walking with seven iron canes, wear down seven pairs of iron shoes, and after filling seven jars with her tears. She begins her quest and, at certain points of the journey, cries over a jar to fills it. After she sits to rest by a tree and fills the seventh jar, she meets an old hermit (who the story explains is a sorcerer and another enemy to the evil princess), who says her journey is almost at an end, for she is near to the evil princess's castle. He also gives her a nut, a hazelnut, and a nut, which she is to use at the last moment, then goes away. Doralice thanks him and goes to the evil princess's castle in man's garments. She breaks the nuts and finds beautiful jewels inside each one. She then passes herself off as a seller from a distant country and trades the jewels for three nights in the Pig King's presence. The evil princess agrees to a trade, and allows Doralice to spend the night with him, but drugs him with a sleeping potion on the first two nights. As such, Doralice cannot wake him up on the first two nights, but manages it on the third. The human Pig King wakes up and recognizes his wife, and the evil princess is killed by the populace.

==== The Pig King (Spoleto) ====
Author Stanislao Prato collected a tale from Spoleto with the title Il re porco. In this tale, a baker has three beautiful daughters. One day, they are visited by an old woman who brings with her a pig. The old woman tells the girls about the pig's marvellous abilities, and convinces the elder girl to come with her to see it for herself. The girl, the old woman and the pig go to a meadow, and the old woman locks the girl with the pig in an underground castle, then explains she will not be released until the pig finds himself a wife. Down in the subterranean castle, the pig insists to marry the girl, but she refuses. The old woman traps the girl behind a room, and goes to fetch the second girl, who undergoes the same events. Finally, the youngest sister decides to go with the old woman so she can meet her sisters, and agrees to marry the pig. On hearing this, the pig turns into a human youth, who says he is a prince, cursed by the old woman since his childhood, and could only be saved if a woman agrees to marry him in pig form. However, the girl cannot tell anyone about this. The girl agrees to his terms, and goes to meet her elder sisters, telling them she accepted the pig's proposal to save them. The sisters press further and the girl is forced to tell the secret. Suddenly, the old woman enters through the doors and orders the elder sisters to return home, adding that the girl's prince will return to his kingdom, and she will only find him if she wears down seven pairs of iron shoes and fill seven jars with her tears - in the timespan of eight months. On learning this, the girl commissions the seven pairs of iron shoes and begins her quest. After seven months, she meets the old woman again, who gives her a nut and an almond nut, and direct her to a city where the human pig prince is. As a final piece of advice, the old woman tells the girl to open the nuts and use their contents to bribe for a night with the prince. The girl follows her orders, dons a pilgrim disguise and goes to the city, then cracks open the nut (which produces a golden pillow) and the almond (which produces a golden statue). The girl trades the golden objects with the local queen for a night with the prince; she fails to wake him up on the first night, because he was given a sleeping drink by the queen, but manages to wake him up on the second. The queen enters the prince's chambers and tries to expel the pilgrimess, but the prince wakes up and expels her instead, letting the pilgrimess be with him.

==== The Story of Prince Pig ====
In an Italian tale from Romagna with the title La föla de prenzip pörz ("The Story of Prince Pig"), translated as Il príncipe porco ("The Pig Prince"), a king and queen have a son that, due to the people's envy, has been cursed into a porcine form by day and human by night. The queen dies, and the pig prince lives with the king. One day, the pig prince pesters his father about marrying, and sets his sights on the miller's daughters, each more beautiful than the other. The miller's elder daughter agrees to a marriage because she wants to become queen. They marry and retire to the wedding chambers; the pig tries to come on to his wife, but the girl insults and shoos him away. For this, he kills her. The pig prince asks the king to marry the middle daughter: the girl accepts and both are eating food at the table. The pig tries to rub himself on the second bride's dress, but she shoos him away. He also kills her. Finally, the miller's young daughter marries the pig prince. When the pig returns home with a sheen of mud to meet his wife, and the girl treats him kindly and cleans his body. For this, when the couple go to the wedding chambers, he turns into a handsome youth. The next day, the girl tells her mother about the prince and she wishes to see it for herself. The girl thus keeps the door slightly ajar for her mother to see him. The next night, the prince turns into a youth and goes to sleep, and his mother-in-law gasps in shock. The pig prince wakes up and admonishes his wife for betraying the secret, then says she can find him again by wearing down seven pairs of iron shoes, seven canes and two iron hats. On her journey, she passes by the houses of the Winds: Tramontano, where she is given a nut by an old woman; by the Maestrale, where she gains a small nut (nocciuola); and by the Bora wind, where an old lady gives her a chestnut (mandorla). At the Bora wind's house, the miller's daughter learns of her husband's location: under the power of the magician Tal dei Tali. The old lady asks the Bora wind to take the girl there. The Bora wind takes her to the magician's palace and she cracks open the first nut, producing a golden "cavallino" (little horse). The magician's son sees the golden object and tells his mother, the magician's wife, he wishes to have it. The miller's daughter makes a trade with the sorceress: the golden little horse for one night with the youth that changes from pig to human. The girl sings some verses by his bedside, but cannot wake the youth, her husband, on the first night, and cracks open the second nut on the second day, producing a diamond "vitellino" (little calf). The magician's son wishes to also have, and the girl trades it for a second night with her husband. For the second time, she cannot wake him up. Failing again, she cracks open the chestnut and releases a little donkey made of gems and jewels, which she trades for a last night with the prince. The prince, lying on the bed, sheds some tears and asks her if she is his wife. The girl confirms it. The prince then reveals he was under a spell that could only be broken if he found a girl to marry and love him. They remarry.

==== King Pig (Tuscany) ====
In a Tuscan tale published by Carlo Lapucci with the title Re Porco ("King Pig"), in a happy kingdom, a king marries a woman, but she cannot have an heir. The kingdom prays for her wellbeing, and she becomes pregnant. One day, the queen in on the balcony to get some air, when a dirty beggar appears to ask for alms. The queen insults him by calling him a dirty pig, and the old beggar curses the queen to bear a pig. In time she does bear a little pig, to her immense sadness. The monarchs let the pig graze around the castle like a pig, and he grows up, being also capable of talking. When he is old enough, the pig grazes in the castle gardens which are near a poor man's garden who has three daughters. The pig prince loves the eldest and asks his father to marry her. After some insistence of the king's part, the poor man convinces his eldest daughter to marry the pig, since by doing so she will elevate her family from their poor status. The marriage is celebrated, and the pig plays in the puddles of mud. At night, he approaches his bride, but she kicks him away and threatens him with a dagger she is hiding in her dress. The girl falls asleep and the pig kills her by biting her neck. Some time later, the pig prince wants to be married to the middle sister and makes a fuss around the castle. Driven by the prince's reckless behaviour, the king convinces the poor man to send his middle daughter as the next bride. During the wedding, the pig plays again in the mud and on the wedding night, the second bride rebuffs him and threatens to poison him in his sleep as revenge for her sister's death, but the pig also kills her. After a period of despair at the castle, the pig grazes near the poor man's garden and notices the cadette's beauty, wanting to marry her this time. The girl herself goes to the king and states she wants to marry the pig prince. She marries the pig and caresses him, then both retire to the marital bed. The pig appears before her, removes his pigskin and reveals himself to be a handsome youth. He explains he is a pig due to his mother's misdeed and his form will vanish with the end of the curse. By morning, the prince dons his porcine disguise and bids her keep the secret. However, despite her promise to do so, the girl reveals the secret to the queen, who wishes to see her son's transformation for herself and spies on him that same night. In the morning, the prince knows that his wife revealed the secret, so he announces he will depart and she will find him if she journeys for seven years, fills seven flasks with her tears and wears down seven pairs of iron shoes and seven iron canes, then vanishes.

The girl and the monarchs try to search for him at the castle and through the kingdom, to no avail, so she decides to journey after him. She reaches the house of the Tramontana wind and an old woman, who welcomes her and gives her a hazelnut, then directs her to the Vento di Ponente, his brother. She reaches a large mountain and enters the house of the Vento di Ponente, who lives with an old woman. Vento di Ponente tells the girl her husband is at another castle and has remarried. Vento di Ponente directs him to his brother, Vento di Levante, and second old woman gives the girl an almond. Lastly, she reaches the house of Vento di Levante and his wife by the seashore. The Vento di Levante welcomes the girl, and reveals the prince is in a very distant place that she will never reach, but the wind agrees to take her there since he is to blow by there the following day. He also gives her a nut for use in the moment of need. The following morning, the Vento di Levante carries the girl towards the location of the pig prince, and advises her to take out the hazelnut the Tramontana gave her amidst the washerwomen and crack it open. The girl descends the wind's ferry, befriends the servants and opens the hazelnut: out come richly decorated and beautiful washing towels. The local queen becomes interested in having them, so she invites the newcomer in, prepares some spicy food doused with somnifer for the prince, and takes the girl to his chambers, leaving her there. The girl tries to wake him up, no to avail, since he is fast asleep. The following morning, the local queen expels the girl, who goes for a walk in the market, then thinks about the almond the Winds gave her: out come many beautiful dresses, gowns, skirts and cloaks that draw the people's attention. The local queen learns of the dresses and wants to have them, so she makes a trade: another night near the prince's bed. The queen gives him food laced with somnifer, so he is fast asleep when his true wife tries to talk to him. On the third day, the girl wanders the city again and learns that some merchants have come to sell their goods, so the girl cracks open the remaining fruit: out of the nut come large diamonds, gold, diadems, tiaras and jewels. The queen learns of the splendid treasure and wishes to have them, but the girl trades it for a final night with the prince. As for the prince, he oversleeps so he decides to stay in bed. A chambermaid mentions the visit of a girl that was crying over him for the past two nights, singing in verse that she wore down seven pairs of iron shoes and filled seven flasks, and the prince realizes his true wife has come. That same night, the prince avoids eating the drugged food by throwing it to some dogs, then pretends to be asleep. The girl enters his room and cries over him, so he wakes up and recognizes his true wife. They embrace and cry happy tears, then leave in the dead of night to their homeland. However, since his vanishing, the monarchs have died, so the prince is crowned the new king, Re Porco, and rules with wisdom along with his wife.

==== The Pig King (Campi Salentina) ====
In an Italian tale collected in 1983, from an informant in Campi Salentina, with the title Lu rre puèrcu ("The Pig King"), a king has a son, who is enchanted by a fairy to be a pig. The queen moves him out to the garden, where the maids throw food to him. One day, the pig tells a maid to inform his parents he wishes to get married. The following morning, he repeats his request, and the queen worries about whom they should marry the pig to. They bring in a young woman and arrange the wedding. The pig rolls in the mud, then approaches his bride and dirties her gown. The bride becomes annoyed and orders a maid to clean him. The pig vows to "deal" with her. During the wedding night, the bride tells the Pig King to sleep under the bed, while she sleeps on the bed. While she is asleep, the Pig King strangles her. In the morning, a maid brings some coffee for them and discovers the dead bride, so the monarchs move him back to the orchard. After a long time, the pig informs his desire to get married. The monarchs worry about finding another bride, and bring in the first girl's sister. They arrange their marriage; the pig husband rolls in mud again and dirties his bride's dress. The second bride complains about it. On the wedding night, she orders him to sleep under the bed while she goes to sleep on it. After night falls, he gets up and kills his second bride. His parents expel him to the garden again. After another while, he repeats his wish to get married, and the monarchs bring the other brides' youngest sister. The third bride married the Pig King. The Pig King rolls in mud and dirties her dress. She simply asks a maid to clean him up and place him beside her. The Pig King is pleased by her attitude. On the wedding night, the Pig King states he will sleep under the bed, but the bride wants him to sleep beside her. In the morning, the maid brings them coffee and milk, and finds the third bride is alive and well.

Months pass, and the third bride asks the Pig Prince what she must do to help him. The Pig King tells her that she should wear down seven pairs of shoes and a hat, then he will become a Christian. The girl commissions a cobbler for the apparel and begins her journey by venturing into the woods. She keeps walking and wandering until she wears down the shoes and the hat, which helps the Pig King to become human again. However, she is unaware that he has remarried. She finally reaches a palace and offers her services as a chick-keeper for the local queen. The Pig King's bride moves to the chicken coop. The story then mentions that the girl walked through the woods and met an old woman who gave her an almond, another old eoman who gave her a hazelnut, and a third old woman that gave her a nut. The girl pocketed the fruits and walked to the palace. She cracks open the almond and releases an old man with a bottle in hand and sat on an armchair, made of gold. The queen's maid goes to fetch some eggs, when she sees the old man gold statuette and informs the queen about it. The queen wishes to have the gold old man statuette, and asks the chicken-keeper about it. The chicken-keeper trades it for a night in the prince's chambers. The queen agrees, but has the young prince drunk, so that he cannot wake up. The Pig King's bride goes to talk to him, saying that she has worn out the seven pairs of shoes for him, but he does not budge. The queen enters the room and expels the other. The Pig King's bride cracks open the walnut and releases a seamstress sewing with apprentices, all made in gold. The same maid sees the second gold statuette and informs the queen, who wishes to have it. The Pig King's bride trades it for a second night in his chambers. Once again, the queen has the prince too drunk to wake up. She fails for the second night. Lastly, she cracks open the little nut, releasing a golden hen with chicks, which she trades for a last night with the prince, who is lying asleep. His bride takes the bottle from the old man statuette and puts it under the prince's nose, causing him to wake up. In a stupor, he asks where he is, and his bride tells him the whole story, how she walked with the seven pairs of shoes for him to become a Christian and gained the fruits from the old women. Now back to waking life, he expels the queen and marries his true bride, who turned him into a Christian. The collector classified the story as the more general type AT 425, while Renato Aprile, editor of the Italian Catalogue of Tales of Magic, classified the tale as the more specific tale type 425A.

==== Other tales ====
Rachel Busk reported a variant told by a teller from Rome. In this tale, the pig prince is cursed by his stepmother, and marries the baker's third daughter. One night, the girl tells her mother about the pig husband's secret, and her mother burns the pigskin the next day. The pig prince disappears, and the girl goes after him. She is given an apple by an old man, a hazelnut by an old woman, and a nut by another old man. The girl reaches the palace of the false bride and cracks open the apple (which produces a golden hen with golden chicks), the hazelnut (which produces a golden carriage driven by golden horses and a golden coachman) and the nut (which produces a herd of sheep that talk instead of bleating). She passes herself off as a poor pilgrim and trades the gifts with the false bride for three nights with the prince. The girl fails to wake him up on the third night, however, but the prince goes to the false bride's bedroom and finds the extravagant gifts. He then inquires the false bride about their origin, and she says a pilgrim gave them. The human pig prince then asks his guards to find the pilgrim, and she seats by his side at the table for morning breakfast.

=== Griko people ===
==== Pig King (Griko) ====
In a Griko tale collected by Domenico Palumbo in late 19th century with the title O kunto mo rekko ("The Tale With the Pig"), translated as Re Porco ("King Pig"), a king and a queen fight over their lack of children. One day, they see a sow guiding its young, and the queen sighs that God gave a sow its young, and prays that she has a son, even if he is a pig. Thus, one is born to her that she gives to a nursemaid to raise. After two years, the pig son cries out that he wants to be married, lest he tears down the palace. The monarchs worry about finding a bride for him, so they find a baker's wife with three daughters who they try to convince to marry one of the girls to the porcine. The eldest sister is readied to her marriage, and refuses to accompany her pig groom to church. During the procession, the pig plays in the mud and tries to clean himself in her dress, but she kicks him away; at church, she kneels down away from the pig son, kicks him again when he plays in the mud again; and refuses to dance and eat with him during her wedding feast, and to even sleep in the same place as him. At night, the pig prince wakes up and kills her. They find her dead the following morning. After two days, the pig prince wants to be married and is given the middle daughter for bride, but he kills her as well.

Lastly, he wants to be married yet again, and they convince the baker's wife to let her cadette marry him. The girl tells the people she wants to accompany the pig king, called Re Porco; and protects him after he plays in the mud and the people want to throw rocks at him. She kneels next to Re Porco and says he was the husband God gave her, marries him, eats with him during the party and chooses to sleep with him. At night, the pig snuffs out the candles, then wakes up in the middle of the night, lights it up again and waves a wand over his porcine form to transform into a handsome youth. He lies with her and asks her not to reveal his secret to anyone. However, the following morning, the girl tells her mother about, and the secret reaches the ears of the king and the queen. For this, the pig prince vanishes from the realm, but appears in another kingdom where he is set to be married to a local maiden, and preparations for their wedding are already under way. As for the pig prince's wife, she realizes her husband is missing and decides to go after him. On the roads she meets three old men, the first giving her a hazelnut, the second one a chestnut, and the third one a nut. The third hermit directs the princess to a nearby city where the pig prince is to be married. The princess reaches the city where her husband is and finds work as a chicken-herder for the family that belongs the maiden the pig prince is to marry soon.

The following morning, the princess cracks open the hazelnut and produces a golden blanket. The maiden sees it and asks her mother to have, who goes to buy it from their new chicken-herder. The princess trades it for a night with the maiden's future groom. The maiden gives him a soporific wine and causes him to sleep soundly. The princess tries to call for him, but he does not budge, and is then removed from his bed. The tailor warn the maiden about the chicken-herder's words, but she pays no heed. The second day, the princess cracks open the chestnut and out comes a golden pavilion. The maiden wishes to have it, and the princess trades it for a night with the prince. Once again, the prince is given a soporific drink and falls asleep, so that his true wife, the princess cannot wake him up, hard as she tries. The tailors alert the prince about the girl who comes at night, singing some verses and mentioning she obtained nuts and hazelnuts to look for her Re Porco. The prince avoids drinking the wine on the third night, and pretends to be asleep. Thirdly, she cracks open the nut and finds a golden candlestick she uses to trade for a last night with the prince. She cries over his body and he wakes up. She tells him she was crying over how she suffered for him, and they notice his second marriage is already prepared for him. However, the prince suggests they ready a carriage for them to escape, and ask the chicken-herder (the princess, his true wife) to try on the bride's dress. The following morning, the prince asks if the chicken-herder can try on the dress, which they agree to do, and says he will go for a walk. The prince and the princess climb on the carriage and ride back to their home kingdom.

=== Switzerland ===
In a Swiss tale collected from an informant named Jolanda Bianchi-Poli, who heard it from her father, in Brusino Arsizio, Tessin with the title Der Vogel mit dem goldenen Schweif ("The Bird with the Golden Tail"), a wicked queen has a handsome son. One day, she mocks the humpbacked son of an old woman neighbour, who tells his mother. The old woman goes to the prince's fairy godmother for a solution, and the fairy decides to punish the queen by turning the prince into a pig. She tells her godchild not to worry and explains his arrogant mother led to this, but the prince is understanding about the situation. The arrogant queen goes to see the prince and finds him in porcine form, to her horror. The prince explains this is her punishment for her arrogance, but the queen sends her son to his chambers, where he resumes human form. He discovers he can become human only in his room, but a pig when he leaves it. His fairy godmother appears to the prince, called Gabriel, and reveals the spell can be reversed if a maiden can kiss him even in his porcine form. The prince, now a pig, wanders off until he reaches a spring in a village, where he looks for a beautiful maiden to kiss him, but a girl rejects him due to being a pig. He returns after a few weeks to seek another maiden, and another maiden rejects him. His fairy godmother assuages he will find one eventually. After some months, a maiden named Giüstina comes to the village fountain to wash clothes, meets the pig, feels sorry for it. The girl kisses him and he turns human, but can only maintain human form at night, turning back to pig in the morning. After a while, prince Gabriel complains that he wishes to see his wife during the day, but his fairy godmother warns him that no one can enter his room to see his true face, lest he turns into a golden-tailed bird. Years into their marriage, Gabriel's arrogant mother hears voices in his room and decides to discover the truth: one day, she barges into their room, ordering Giüstina to leave the castle. Gabriel wants his mother to leave the room, since he is married now, and to avoid his misfortune. However, Gabriel turns into a golden-tailed bird, laments his mother's impetuous action, and flies away through the window. His fairy godmother consoles Giüstina, saying she must search for him for seven years, seven months and seven days, wearing seven pairs of iron shoes, seven iron canes and filling seven jars with her tears. On the road, she passes by the houses of three cannibals, where she gains three nuts from the cannibals' wives. The cannibals' wives also direct her to keep journeying after the golden-tailed bird. She finally reaches the North Wind and asks if it saw the golden-tailed bird. The North Wind says it blew just there, and offers to carry Giüstina there. The Wind carries the girl to a castle, where she finds work as a goose-herder. The fairy advises her to open up the nuts; Giüstina does so and finds three splendid dresses she puts on. The local princess sees the wonderful dresses and wishes to have them, so Giüstina trades them for a night in the prince's chambers, one dress for one night. The prince is back to human form, and is given a soporific potion by the princess for her to hinder Giüstina's attempts. On the third night, the prince pretends to drink the potion and feigns sleep. After Giüstina enters the room to talk to him, he wakes up and recognizes his true love, Giüstina, saying that the fairy told him everything. Suddenly, the fairy enters the room and bids them escape on two horses she provided them, for the local princess will soon discover them. Giustina and the prince flee, as the castle explodes and burns behind them, then they marry at the Church of San Lorenzo.

=== France (Hautes-Alpes) ===
In a French tale from Dauphiné collected by folklorist Charles Joisten with the title Le roi cochon ("The Pig King"), a king marries and, after four years into his marriage, cannot have a son to succeed him. One day, he walks on the road and meets a gentleman that asks him the reason for his sadness. The king explains he has no son, but wants one, even if he has the head of a pig, so the gentleman, who is the Devil, makes true on the king's words: nine months later, a prince with the pig head is born. When he is twenty years old, he makes a fuss around the castle for he wants to be married. The king issues a proclamation for brides to present to him. On the edge of the village, a woodcutter lives with his three daughters. The eldest girl reads the proclamation and decides to marry him. She marries the prince with the pig's head, but rebuffs his caresses. For this, he takes a knife and cuts up her belly on the wedding night. After killing the first bride, he demands another, so the king issues another edict for a girl to present herself. The woodcutter's middle daughter decides to try her luck in marrying the pig-headed prince, rebuffs the prince's advances and kills her the same way as her elder sister. His parents reprimand him for it, and still he decides to marry. The youngest daughter promises her father she will become queen, and that the pig will not kill her. She marries the pig-headed prince and covers him with caresses. The following morning, the queen finds her daughter-in-law alive, and she declares she loves her husband. She lives with him for ten months. One night, she notices that the prince's head does not look like a pig's, and admires his beauty. The prince asks her not to tell his parents about it, lest the pig's head return to him and he has to wear it for a year and a day. The girl goes to her parents-in-law and the queen notices she looks suspiciously happy. After a week, the queen notices the girl is hiding some secret, and she blabbers about the prince's secret, saying he looks like a handsome youth, to the queen's disbelief.

When she goes to her marital bed at night, the prince accuses his wife of betraying his secret, then says he will depart to the third part of the realm, and she will only find him if she wears down seven wooden pairs and seven pairs of iron shoes, then vanishes. The girl commissions the pairs of wood and iron and departs with her parents-in-law's blessing. She passes by a house in the forest that belongs to an ogre and his wife, asking if they heard anything about "Fils du Roi Cochon". The ogre gives her a nut of glass and directs her to his brothers. She reaches the house of the ogre brother and gains another glass nut and sends her to his other brother. The girl reaches the third brother's house and gains a third glass nut. The third ogre brother lets her have a maidservant and a horse she can use to reach the location of Roi Cochon. The girl rides the horse with the maidservant and they reach a castle, where she finds work as kitchen servant to do the dishes. The girl does her work and goes to sleep under the stairs, then takes out the first glass nut, releasing a silk robe. The poultry starts to crow that the dish-washing girl is more beautiful than the lady of the house. The mistress of the house then asks the girl to sell her dress, but the girl trades it for a night in Roi Cochon's quarters. She enters the Roi Cochon's chambers and realizes he no longer has a pig's head, and the tale explains he reached this castle, married its mistress, and the mistress's mother doused his coffee with chloroform to induce his sleep. She cannot wake him up on the first day, so she opens the second glass nut on the second day and releases a silver robe, which she trades with the local mistress for a second night in Roi Cochon's quarters, failing to wake him up yet again. A person that lives next door to the prince talks to him the following morning and tells him about the girl crying over him at night, calling him Jean and crying that she was looking for him and was almost devoured in the forest by ogres. The prince realizes this is the third bride he married after the other two, who has come for him after a long journey.

Back to his wife, she opens the last glass nut and out comes a dress of diamonds which she trades for a last night with Roi Cochon. The mistress enters the wedding hall and Roi Cochon notices the second wife has a diamond dress she produced from somewhere, then drinks his tea and retires to his quarters to wait for his true wife. The girl enters the room and she reunites with Roi Cochon, who forgives her for breaking his trust. The following morning, Roi Cochon is joined by his true wife and demands the three robes back from the mistress of the castle, and rides a carriage back to his parents' realm. The girl knocks on the king's door and they welcome her back, then introduces the monarchs to his son, now fully human. A second marriage is celebrated with a grand ceremony.

== See also ==
- The Pig King
- The Enchanted Pig
- The Enchanted Prince Who was a Hedgehog
- The Story of King Pig (Corsican fairy tale)
