= The Story of King Pig (Corsican fairy tale) =

The Story of King Pig (Corsican: U Purcellu; French: L'histoire du Roi-Porc) is a Corsican fairy tale, collected by Ghjuvan Ghjaseppiu Franchi. It concerns a prince born in pig form who marries three times, but kills the first two brides for a perceived rudeness and spares the third one due to her kindness. Eventually, she betrays his secret and has to search for him, finding him on the verge of marrying another bride.

The tale is related to the international cycle of the Animal as Bridegroom or The Search for the Lost Husband, wherein a human maiden marries a prince cursed to be an animal, loses him and has to search for him.

== Summary ==
In this tale, a king and a queen are married, but cannot have children. The doctors, apothecaries, oracles, healers and magicians cannot help her, since the queen is infertile. One day, the queen walks through a narrow street, spots a sow with its young, and wishes she could be the one in place of the sow. In time, the queen becomes pregnant, to the king's and the kingdom's happiness, but the queen gives birth to a pig. The kingdom laments that the prince is a pig, but the monarchs make the best of the situation and raise the pig son as befits a royal prince, with large accommodations and a royal basin, but their son is still a pig.

When he is old, he sings some verses that he wishes to be married, lest he destroys the city. A nurse brings the news to the queen, who is astonished that her pig son spoke and wants a bride. The king goes over whose family can provide a daughter, from the noblemen to the generals, the soldiers, when he thinks about the miller and his three beautiful daughters. The king goes to talk to the miller in person and tries to convince him to arrange a marriage between their children. The eldest daughter overhears their exchange and declares she wishes to marry the prince, unaware he is a pig. The king takes the miller's elder daughter and organizes the wedding: the girl is wearing a blue dress dotted with stars and the pig prince is decked. When the wedding procession passes by a rivulet, the pig goes to play in the water, dirties himself with mud and goes to rub his body in the bride's dress, but she insults him by calling pig. For this, the pig pierces the bride with his tusks, the wedding is postponed and the monarchs take him back.

Some time later, the prince announces he wishes to be married again, lest he destroys the city. The king goes to talk to the miller to let the middle daughter marry the pig prince, but the miller accuses the pig of killing his elder daughter. Still, the middle daughter overhears the exchange and states her wish to marry the prince, thinking she will be the reigning princess in case of her pig husband's incapacity. During the wedding procession, the second bride is wearing a dress coloured like the summer sky, and they pass by the same rivulet. The pig prince rolls over in the mud and goes to clean himself on her dress, but she calls him pig. For this, he kills her with his tusks. The kingdom grieves for the whole affair.

The pig prince grows even larger and demands another bride. The king goes to talk to miller, who refuses to deliver his cadette, wanting to die in her place. The cadette offers herself to marry the pig prince, and the wedding procession passes by the same rivulet. The pig prince enjoys playing the mud, and the girl cleans him up with her white dress. The wedding is celebrated, and in the marital bed, the girl waits for the pig, when a handsome youth appears to her, saying he is the pig. She is incredulous at first, but the prince explains that she saved him from his spell, but she must remain silent about the secret and he will return to his pigskin in the morning. The new princess remains blissful in her wedding to the pig and acts loving towards him, which arouses the queen's suspicions.

One day, she confronts her daughter-in-law about her behaviour, but she feigns ignorance. The queen presses her for answers for some days more and the girl relents: the pig prince becomes a handsome youth at night when he removes the pigskin. The queen confirms her suspicions that her son was under a curse and wishes to hold a celebration for the occasion, but the girl makes her promise to keep the secret between them. Thus, they plan to burn the animal skin that same night. The princess justifies that she is breaking the curse as an act of love: while the prince is asleep, she burns the pigskin in the oven. When he wakes up, he asks for the skin, but the princess says she burned it. The prince chastises her, saying she will never see him again, turns into a green bird and perches on the windowsill. The princess asks for forgiveness and another chance, the prince thinks a bit on the idea and says she must do the impossible: fill seven jars with her tears and search for him by wearing down seven iron staves and seven pairs of iron shoes.

The prince flies off, and his wife prepares herself for the journey, by collecting her tears and commissioning the iron apparel from a smith. She journeys far and wide, until the shoes are all worn out and the seventh iron staff is but a stick in her hands. She traverses countries and lands, but no one knows of her husband. She reaches a hermit's house in a desert who welcomes her. He does not know the location of Green Bird, but gives her a hazelnut and directs her to another brother. She reaches the second hermit brother's house by a ravine, gains an almond, and departs for another brother's house. Lastly, she reaches a humble house at the end of the world and is welcomed by the third hermit brother. The third hermit does not know of any Green Bird in his two hundred years living there, but he has heard rumours of a bird-prince marrying a princess. The girl is surprised, since she is the prince's wife, who surpassed the tests, but the hermit explains that the prince's curse has ended, and he returned to normal, subject to the same foibles as a normal human. Before she leaves, the hermit gives her a nut, for her open in the moment of need.

The girl soldiers on and reaches the royal palace, then breaks open the hazelnut: out comes a golden hen with chicks, which she trades with the local princess for a night within its walls. The pig prince's wife has the opportunity to look for her husband and finds a set of locked doors, then calls out for the pig prince by shouting "Ghjuvà", since the tale explains his name is Ghjuvanni. She fails in the first night, and the princess expels her from the castle. The second day, she takes out the almond and cracks it open, revealing an object even more splendid than the first one, which she trades for another night to wander the palace halls. The girl goes to the locked doors and cries out for Ghjuvà, but he was given a somnifer to sleep.

Lastly, the girl cracks open the remaining nut and produces an indescribable object she trades with the princess for a last night in the palace. As for Ghjuvanni, in the morning, a servant informs the prince of the girl crying for him, since the residents cannot sleep at all due to the crying. Ghjuvà avoids drinking the herbal drink the princess offers him and opens the door when he hears his name: he finds his true wife, whom he cannot recognize due to looking like a wanderer. She breaks down in front of him, and he feels embarrassed, so he goes to talk to his future father-in-law about a riddle: he is at the shop with an offer of two she-calves, one familiar to him, and the other unfamiliar to him. The king says he should keep the she-calf he knows, and Ghjuvanni explains the whole story to the king. The local monarch releases Ghjuvanni from his engagement and he returns with his wife to their homeland.

== Analysis ==
=== Tale type ===
French scholars Paul Delarue and Marie-Louise Thèneze, establishers of the French folktale catalogue, follow Jan-Öjvind Swahn's classification: French type 425A (or sous-type A) follows Cupid and Psyche with the tasks; type 425B is the one with the gifts and the three nights.

The French type corresponds, in the international Aarne-Thompson-Uther Index, to type ATU 425, "The Search for the Lost Husband". More specifically, it is classified as subtype ATU 425A, "The Animal (Monster) as Bridegroom": the princess burns the husband's animal skin and she must seek him out, even paying a visit to the Sun, the Moon and the Wind and gaining their help. The heroine is given marvellous objects on the way to her husband by the personifications of the elements, or by her helpers, and she uses them to bribe the false bride for a night with him. Only on the third night the heroine manages to talk to her husband and he recognizes her.

=== Motifs ===
==== The heroine's gifts ====
According to Hans-Jörg Uther, the main feature of tale type ATU 425A is "bribing the false bride for three nights with the husband". In fact, when he developed his revision of Aarne-Thompson's system, Uther remarked that an "essential" trait of the tale type ATU 425A was the "wife's quest and gifts" and "nights bought". The heroine gains magical fruits from her helpers which she opens and finds objects connected to a traditional female milieu (a distaff, a spindle, and a spinning wheel).

==== The animal husband ====
Polish philologist Mark Lidzbarski noted that the pig prince usually appears in Romance language tales, while the hedgehog as the animal husband occurs in Germanic and Slavic tales. The prince is born as a pig due to his mother's fear or a rash desire for a son, and marries the third maiden that welcomes her, after two other girls (sisters) reject him as a potential suitor. According to Claudine Vassas, the pig appears as the prince's transformation in "many Mediterranean versions". In the same vein, professor Marie-Gracieuse Martin-Gistucci suggested that, in the Corsican area, author Straparola's tale The Pig King was the source of the local tales, since the pig appears as the animal groom in the island.

== Variants ==
=== The Little Red Pig ===
Linguist Genevieve Massignon collected a Corsican tale from an informant from Cambia, Castagniccia. In this tale, titled Le petit cochon rouge or U porcellu rossu ("The Little Red Pig"), a couple has a little red pig as their son. One day, when he is old enough, he asks to be married, but his parents question the possibility of anyone marrying a pig. Eventually, a girl comes to marry the pig, and they live together. Some nights later, the pig's mother asks her daughter-in-law how she can live with the animal, and she answers he becomes a youth at night. The following night, the girl leaves the door ajar so the pig's mother can see her son's human shape on bed, then she enters, takes his pigskin and throws it in the fire. It crackles thrice, then burns. The next morning, the human pig asks his wife for his skin, and she answers his mother burned it. The youth then says his wife will never find him again unless she wears down one pair of iron shoes, and vanishes. The girl puts on the iron shoes and begins her journey. She meets three old woman on the road, and each gives her a nut, an almond, and a hazelnut. The girl finally reaches another city, where she finds her husband already married to another woman. She cracks open the nuts and discovers beautiful threads inside (the first of silk, the second of silver and the third of gold), which she uses to bribe for three nights with her husband's new bride. The girl fails on the first two nights, since the second wife has given the pig youth a sleeping potion, but she manages to wake him up on the third night. The human pig explains everything to the second wife, then returns with the girl to his parents.

=== The Red Piglet ===
Massignon collected a second Corsican tale with the title U purchettu rossu, translated to French as Porcelet rouge ("The Red Piglet"), a rich lady is married, but still has no children. One day, she spots with her husband a red sow with its piglets, and utters aloud she wishes to have a piglet as a son. Thus one is born to her. When the piglet son is seventeen or eighteen, he makes a fuss around the house, wanting to be married. One day, his mother arranges for a poor, but honest girl, promising her marriaged to the pig son will make her rich. The pig bridegroom plays in the mud before the wedding, and the girl shoves him. He marries her, then rolls in the mud on the road back. The bride tries to kick him out, but she falls into the mudslide and dies. After some six months of mourning, the pig son wants to get married, and his mother questions him, saying that he killed his previous bride, but he says that she killed herself. Still, the woman finds another poor, honest girl from the village and arranges his wedding. The pig son tells the girl she will not die, since she is kind. The girl hugs him, and he cherishes her, and even during the wedding the girl repeats her affections motions to him. The pig son plays in the mud and goes to meet his second bride, who simply takes a veil and cleans him up. They retire to the bridal bed, and the pig bridegroom shows himself to the girl, saying that he is no pig, but if she reveals his secret, she will have to search for him with an iron staff, in iron dress and in iron shoes and after filling a large jar with her tears. The pig son removes his pigskin and tells his name is Agellu Nasci Verde ("Bird Born Green"). The following morning, the rich lady asks her daughter-in-law about how she spent the night, and the girl sighs that he was very kind to her. She keeps pestering the girl with questions for days, and she reveals that the lady's son was a handsome man, not a pig, so the rich lady orders some servants to steal the pigskin and burn it after he removes it that same night. The servants burn the porcine skin in the oven, and the smell alerts the human pig son. He wakes up with a startle, tells his wife to search for the objects he mentions, and vanishes through the window. The girl cries for anyone to help in the castle, to no avail, so she dons the iron apparel, takes a jar to fill with her tears, and departs. After filling up the jar with her tears, she reaches a house in the forest, and an old woman, the mother of Libecciu, the southeast wind, welcomes her. When Libecciu comes home, she asks him where she can find Agellu Nasci Verte, which he does not know, but his mother gives her a nut. The princess reaches the house of Scorna-mule, a freezing wind, and his mother. Scorna-mule places her on the road towards Agellu Nasci Verde, and his mother gives her an almond. She finally reaches the house of an old woman, mother of Tramontana, a dry wind. The Tramontana wind arrives and his mother asks him about the whereabouts of Agellu Nasci Verde: the wind says that he married the princess of Spain, and the wind has just been there blowing the flowers in his garden. Tramontana's mother gives the woman a chestnut, and the girl resumes her journey, until she reaches the king's palace. She opens the nut, producing a distaff that spins gold she uses to trade for a night with the princess's husband. The princess agrees to a deal, but gives the prince (the human pig son) some opium to make him asleep. The girl tries to wake him up, saying that she wore down the iron apparel and filled the flask, but he does not nudge. A neighbouring shoemaker overhears her lament that night. The following day, she cracks open the almond and finds a golden cup she uses to trade for a second night; she tries to wake the prince, to no avail. The third morning, the shoemaker alerts the prince during a walk a girl comes at night to talk to him, and the prince realizes this was his true wife, come to look for him. He tries to search for her down the port, and orders the sailors to hoist anchor later that night, for he plans to leave. Back to his true wife, she cracks open the chestnut, producing a second golden cup she trades for a final night with the prince. The princess tries to drug him again, but he discards the opium and pretends to be asleep. The girl enters his room and they recognize each other. They reunite and take the ship back to their homeland. Agellu Nasci Verde returns home to his parents, and lives in happiness with his wife. The tale was provided by informant M. Martin Spinosa, from Pietra, commune d'Albertacce, in Niolo.

== See also ==
- King Crin
- The Enchanted Pig
- The Enchanted Prince Who was a Hedgehog
- Hans My Hedgehog
- The Pig King
