= Monika Kropej =

Slovenian ethnologist and folklorist (born 1956)

Monika Kropej Telban (née Šašel, born 4 February 1956) is a Slovenian ethnologist and folklorist. She works as a research advisor at the Institute of Slovenian Ethnology of the Scientific Research Centre of the Slovenian Academy of Sciences and Arts (ZRC SAZU).

== Biography ==
Monika Kropej was born on 14 February 1956 in Ljubljana. She completed classical secondary school in 1974 and graduated in ethnology and art history from the Faculty of Arts, University of Ljubljana, in 1980. She began working at the Slovenian Ethnographic Museum in 1983 and has been affiliated with the Institute of Slovenian Ethnology since 1985.

She earned her master's degree in 1989 with a thesis on Karel Štrekelj's ethnological legacy and completed her Ph.D. in 1993 with a dissertation on folk culture in Slovenian fairy tales and legends, both at the University of Ljubljana. Kropej has collaborated with the University of Udine's Centre for Plurilingualism, including a joint project with Roberto Dapit to preserve audio recordings of folk narratives collected by Milko Matičetov in Resia. Since 1998, she has been involved in the publication of the journal Studia mythologica Slavica, and since 1999 has served as co-editor of the collection Zakladnica slovenskih pripovedi ('Treasury of Slovenian Tales').

She was director of the Institute of Slovenian Ethnology from November 2002 to October 2010. She is a member of the International Society for Folk Narrative Research, the International Society for Contemporary Legend Research, and the Slovenian Ethnological Society.

== Works ==
=== Research ===
Kropej Telban's research focuses on literary folklore, narrative culture, folk medicine, folk belief, and the history of Slovenian ethnology.

She has published articles in Slovenian and international academic journals and edited volumes, including contributions to the German journal Fabula and the Estonian journal Folklore, and entries for several encyclopaedias, including the Enzyklopädie des Märchens (Göttingen), the Enzyklopädie der slowenischen Kultur in Kärnten (Vienna), and the Encyclopedia of Romantic Nationalism in Europe (ERNIE).

=== Awards ===
In 1996, she received the Golden Medal of the Scientific Research Centre of the Slovenian Academy of Sciences and Arts. In 2023, she won the Murek Award from the Slovenian Ethnological Society in recognition of her contributions to ethnological research. In 2025, she received the Štrekl Award for her contributions to the collection and preservation of Slovenian folk heritage.

== Publications ==
- Pravljica in stvarnost (1995) [Folk Tale and Reality]
- Kropej, Monika (2001). Karel Štrekelj: Iz vrelcev besedne ustvarjalnosti [Karel Štrekelj: From the Springs of Poetics] (in Slovenian). Ljubljana: Založba ZRC. ISBN 978-961-6358-29-3. OCLC 48262990.
- Od ajda do zlatoroga – Slovenska bajeslovna bitja (2008) [From Ajd to Goldenhorn. Slovenian Mythological Beings]
- A Treasury of Slovenian Folklore (2010)
- Supernatural Beings from Slovenian Myths and Folktales (2012)
- Tipni indeks slovenskih ljudskih pravljic; Živalske pravljice in basni (2015) [Type Index of Slovenian Folktales, Animal Tales and Fables]
- Telban, Monika Kropej (2025). Tipni indeks slovenskih ljudskih pravljic. Čudežne pravljice 1 [The Type Index of Slovenian Folktales – Tales of Magic] (in Slovenian). Vol. 1. Ljubljana: ZRC SAZU. doi:10.3986/9789610509660. ISBN 978-961-05-0966-0.
- Telban, Monika Kropej (2025). Tipni indeks slovenskih ljudskih pravljic. Čudežne pravljice II [The Type Index of Slovenian Folktales – Tales of Magic] (in Slovenian). Vol. 2. Ljubljana: ZRC SAZU. doi:10.3986/9789610510307. ISBN 978-961-05-1030-7.
