= Anna Gaskell =

American art photographer and artist

- "Untitled #2" in Gaskell's photography series, "wonder"
- Born: October 22, 1969 (age 57); Des Moines, Iowa, US
- Known for: Photography

Anna Gaskell (born October 22, 1969) is an American art photographer and artist from Des Moines, Iowa.

She is best known for her photographic series that she calls "elliptical narratives" which are similar to the works produced by Cindy Sherman. Like Sherman, Gaskell's works are influenced by film and painting, rather than the typical conventions of photography. She lives in Los Angeles.

== Early life and education ==
Gaskell's mother was an evangelical Christian who brought Anna and her brother along on "wild pilgrimages throughout the Midwest," where they would witness miracles being performed, acts of healing, people speaking in tongues, and other Charismatic Christian practices. She claims that she does not remember anything strange about these acts, "but more a feeling of excitement and a security in the faith that [she] felt from everyone there." Gaskell says that her work revolves around a similar idea of faith, believing the possibility of the impossible and suspension of disbelief. After studying for two years at Bennington College, she received her BFA from the School of the Art Institute of Chicago in 1992. In 1995, she received her MFA from Yale School of Art, studying under Gregory Crewdson.

== Career ==
Gaskell stages all of her scenes, using the style of "narrative photography," wherein each scene exists only to be photographed. Gaskell pioneers a new discourse of contemporary photography where within each of her series, the narrative of her photographs is disrupted, "its fragments functioning like film stills excised from their context but suggesting a missing whole." There are gaps of space and time left between each photograph, evoking a "vivid and dreamlike world." In a 2002 interview with curator Matthew Drutt of the Menil Collection, Gaskell describes her creative process and the inspiration she draws from other sources in the following way: "The stories and events that I choose to use as jumping-off points are simply that. They are only a part of what goes into the work, and perhaps a useful reference for viewers. [...] Trying to combine fiction, fact, and my own personal mishmash of life into something new is how I make my work. Into all of this, I try to insert a degree of mystery that ensures that the dots may not connect in the same way every time."

=== 1990s ===
1996

In haunting photographic scenes of preadolescent girls, Gaskell alludes to well-known children's literature, such as Lewis Carroll's Alice's Adventures in Wonderland, which can be found in two of her series: wonder (1996–97) and override (1997). Gaskell made her international debut with the twenty photograph series, wonder (1996–97), the first series Gaskell created after receiving her MFA at Yale University School of Art. wonder, which draws the viewer in with stained-glass coloration intensified by lamination, features two identically dressed Alices photographed together and separately and at oblique angles that recall the disorienting experiences of Alice in Wonderland. For example, in Untitled #1 of wonder, one of the Alices is pictured treading in a pool of her tears, "her body grotesquely distorted by the refraction of light on the water" and in Untitled #2, one Alice leans over the other, plugging her nose, seemingly about to perform mouth-to-mouth resuscitation. These two photographs also demonstrate how Gaskell takes on the role of "unreliable narrator" within her series by her "use of photography as a format which invites the suspension of disbelief, with her codings and fragmentations of the frames exposing the viewer to the inconsistencies and assumptions that are held in place by realist photographic as well as narrative conventions.” Through the use of different sized photographs, Gaskell displays an instability in Alice by referring to the character's growth spurts and shrinking spells.

1997

In the series override, allusions to Alice's Adventures in Wonderland are made again, as in wonder, but in this series, the scenarios are drawn from Gaskell's own imagination. override features seven versions of Alice which alternate between roles of victim and aggressor. A description about the series written by Solomon R. Guggenheim Museum curators states, "[The seven versions of Alice] try to control the changes to her body by literally, physically holding her in place — a potent metaphor for the anxiety and confusion experienced by children on the verge of adolescence." Color and chiaroscuro play a large role in Gaskell's work as they lead the viewer to the main source of action in each piece. While the wonder series features cool blue tones, the photographs featured in override were captured in the "golden hues of Twilight." The constantly changing scale of the photographs, the physical stretching and pulling actions performed by the models, and the range of size of the photographs themselves (6 x 7 1/4 inches to 60 x 90 inches) all relate to the central metaphor of Alice in Wonderland: change.

Gaskell's film Floater repeats in a backwards sequence a scene of an Ophelia-like young woman in a pool of water, trying to decide whether she should drown or save herself. The theme of this cycle of indecision is seen again in her series half life in 2002.

1998

In her photographic series, hide, Gaskell references a lesser-known Brothers Grimm tale, "The Magic Donkey." This series features young girls alone in a gothic mansion, creating a sense of dread and underlying sexual intrigue that takes its impetus from the tale of a young woman forced to hide beneath animal skins to hide from the matrimonial desires of her father. The name of the series is drawn from the children's game hide-and-seek, the dual personality of Dr. Jekyll and Mr. Hyde, and the literal skin, or hide, that creates a boundary between the inside and the outside, the self and the other.

1999

In 1999, Gaskell produced two series, Sally Salt says and by proxy, both of which featured Sally Salt, the female protagonist in The Adventures of Baron Munchausen, a 1988 British comedy film based on the tall tales told about 18th-century German baron Karl Friedrich Hieronymus von Munchausen. by proxy takes on a darker tone by combining the fictional, gullible, and lovable Sally Salt character with a real-life serial killer, Genene Jones, a pediatric nurse who, in the early 1980s, was found guilty of the murder of several children in Texas. Gaskell's models in by proxy wear white nurse's outfits. The girls in the photographs represent Genene Jones at different stages in her life, battling with her own tormented mind. The title of the series draws from Munchausen syndrome by proxy, a type of child abuse in which a caregiver purposefully makes a child under their care ill, usually to attract the attention or sympathy of others upon themselves. Though all of her series are imbued with a sense of darkness, compared to the fictional stories depicted in her previous series such as override and wonder, by proxy is all the more unsettling in that it highlights real-life and disturbing subjects such as Munchausen syndrome by proxy and the Jones murders.

=== 2000s ===
2002

Gaskell's half life—drawn from stories such as Daphne du Maurier's Rebecca, Elizabeth Gaskell's (no relation) "The Old Nurse's Story," and Henry James' The Turn of the Screw—began as an idea for a film installation and evolved into an exhibition combining still and moving images with ten photographs and a film installation. The unnamed central character of Rebecca, a tale from 1938 about an ingénue who goes abroad, marries a middle-aged patrician, and follows him back to his ancestral estate in Cornwall. There the young woman finds the house filled with the memory of the man's dead first wife, Rebecca, which torments the heroine to the brink of suicide. half life draws from the idea of Rebecca's presence in the estate and the heroine's mind. This series explores the human psyche, including the experiences of fear, isolation, and uncertainty. As seen in her previous works, the protagonist of half life is a young woman who finds herself between "the purity of youth and the gradual loss of innocence that comes with maturity." Differing itself from previous series, the question of identity is pushed to a new level in half life by the almost total exclusion of the main figure. When shown, the woman often has her back to the camera or remains hidden behind her hair. Gaskell uses dynamic camera angles and elaborately decorated interiors in her photographs in half life creating a sense of vertigo or claustrophobia. The accompanying 21-minute film, similar to her piece, Floater (1997), features a woman floating under water in a state of non-being, neither fully dead or alive.

2007

In her video, Acting Lessons, Gaskell plays the protagonist, an actress who is performing a monologue and is continuously interrupted by an acting coach off screen. In this piece, Gaskell adopts "a mundane living room as the setting for her portrayal of emotional power struggles."

== Exhibitions ==
=== Solo exhibitions ===
1997

- wonder, Casey Kaplan Gallery, New York

1999

- by proxy, Casey Kaplan Gallery, New York
- Sally Salt says…, Galerie Gisela Capitain, Cologne
- Hide, White Cube, London
- Anna Gaskell, Museum of Contemporary Art, North Miami; Museum of Modern Art, Oxford; Astrup Fearnley Museet, Oslo; Hasselblad Center, Gothenburg, Sweden

2000

- by proxy, Aspen Art Museum, Colorado

2001

- Des Moines Art Center, Iowa
- Castello di Rivoli, Turin, Italy
- Resemblance, Casey Kaplan Gallery, New York
- Remarkable Places, Kölnischer Kunstverein, Cologne
- Future's Eve, New Langton Arts, San Francisco

2002

- Half Life, The Menil Collection, Houston; White Cube, London
- Addison Gallery of American Art, Phillips Academy, Andover, Massachusetts
- Le studio, Yvon Lambert, Paris

2003

- Anagram, Galerie Gisela Capitain, Cologne
- How Some Children Play at Slaughtering, Project Room, Chicago

2004

- Casey Kaplan Gallery, New York
- At Sixes and Sevens, Yvon Lambert, Paris

2005

- 1991, Galleria Massimo De Carlo, Milan
- Erasers, Galerie Gisela Capitain, Cologne

2006

- Everything That Rises, Second Street Gallery, Charlottesville, Virginia

2007

- Paint Your Own Pictures, Yvon Lambert, New York
- Still Life, Vizcaya Museum and Garden, Miami
- Erasers, The Box, Wexner Center for the Arts, Columbus, Ohio

2009

- Replayground, Galerie Gisela Capitain, Cologne

2010

- Turns Gravity, Yvon Lambert, New York

2013

- Penguin, Yvon Lambert, Paris
- The Romantic Exiles, Galerie Gisela Capitain, Cologne

2014

- Vampyr (with Douglas Gordon), Yvon Lambert, Paris

=== Select group exhibitions ===
1998

- Sightings, Institute of Contemporary Arts (ICA), London

2002

- Photography Past/Forward. Aperture at 50, Aperture's Burden Gallery, New York
- Moving Pictures, Solomon R. Guggenheim Museum, New York

2007

- Global Feminisms, Elizabeth A. Sackler Center for Feminist Art, The Brooklyn Museum, New York

2012

- Exquisite Corpses. Drawings and Configuration, The Museum of Modern Art, New York
- Ecstatic Alphabets / Heaps of Language, The Museum of Modern Art, New York

== Reception ==
Grace Glueck, writing in The New York Times in 2004, described Gaskell as an established "maker of spooky, tension-filled feminine fictions", her work recalling Lewis Carroll's Alice in Wonderland, Daphne du Maurier's novel Rebecca and the films of Alfred Hitchcock. In Glueck's view, Gaskell's method is "to create a narrative expectation without fulfilling it", each picture hinting at a situation or story, provoking the viewer to speculate. Glueck does not necessarily approve of this, calling the process of challenging the viewer to make a story "do[ing] the artist's work".

Robert Mahoney, reviewing Gaskell's first exhibition of color photographs in 1997, calls the show a "masquerade" with a pair of "pretty twins" playing at Alice in Wonderland in blue pinafores, white tights and "black Mary Jane shoes". Mahoney calls this an intense search for identity, observing that the use of twins brings out the "mirror-like clarity" of Alice's dream journey. In his view, the blue and white coloration recalls the Virgin Mary, while the use of young women to represent "prepubescent girls" brings sexuality into the images.

Christopher Mooney, writing for ArtReview in 2014, reviews an exhibition in Paris of Gaskell's photographs alongside her ex-partner Douglas Gordon's "wall, floor, and corner works". Mooney calls it a swan song, the exhibition featuring swan taxidermy in "many" of Gordon's works, and a Bolshoi ballet prima ballerina, Svetlana Lunkina, who "danc[es] across Gaskell's screens". Mooney finds Lunkina the strongest element in the show, Gaskell's photographs displaying her as both graceful and "affecting".

== Awards ==
- Citigroup Private Bank Photography Prize (2000).
- Nancy Graves Foundation Grant (2002).
- Des Moines Art Center Artists Residency, Des Moines (2005)
- KunstFilmBiennale, Cologne, best film in the art category: Erasers (2005)
- NYFA Grant (2010)
- Artslink Grant (2010)
- Bohen Foundation Grant (2010)
- Recollects Residency, Paris (2011)
