= The Goat Girl =

Greek fairy tale

The Goat Girl is a Greek fairy tale, known in many variants, collected by Anna Angelopoulou, Johann Gottfried von Hahn, and Georgios Ioannou. It bears many similarities to the French Donkeyskin.

== Synopsis ==
A couple had no children; the wife prayed for any child, no matter what. One day, she gave birth to a baby goat who grew up as playful as any child. Her mother wished that her father could have a jug of water, and the goat agreed to carry it if her mother tied it to her horns. She carried it to her father, and when she was coming back, she took off her skin in the woods to clean it. A prince saw her and fell in love. Though his parents and her parents were opposed, he grew lovesick, and the queen insisted on the pairing, so her parents gave the goat to the queen, and the prince grew well again.

The prince and his parents went to a wedding. The goat girl changed into a golden gown and went to the wedding herself; after the ceremonial dance, she threw a golden apple among the guests to confuse them and fled, and the king and queen admired her beauty. On the second day, the same thing happened. On the third day, the prince ordered his servants to preheat an oven and told his parents he would not attend the wedding. When the goat girl went, he seized her skin and burned it. When she returned, she tried to throw herself into the oven after the skin, but the prince restrained her, and afterwards they had a grand wedding.

== See also ==
- The Donkey
- The Fisher-Girl and the Crab
- The Pig King
