= The Hedgehog, the Merchant, the King and the Poor Man =

Hungarian fairy tale about wonder children

The Hedgehog, the Merchant, the King and the Poor Man (Hungarian: A sündisznó; English: "The Hedgehog") is a Hungarian fairy tale collected by László Merényi and translated by folklorist Jeremiah Curtin.

The first part of the tale refers to the international cycle of Animal as Bridegroom, wherein a human maiden marries a prince cursed to be an animal, and disenchants him. The second part of the tale belongs to the cycle of the Calumniated Wife and is classified in the international Aarne-Thompson-Uther Index as type ATU 707, "The Three Golden Children". The latter type refers to stories where a girl promises a king she will bear a child or children with wonderful attributes, but her jealous relatives or the king's wives plot against the babies and their mother.

== Summary ==
A merchant loses his way in the forest. After five days trying and failing to find a way out, he utters out loud a promise to marry one of his three daughters to anyone that can help him out of the woods, as well as three sacks of coin as a wedding gift. Suddenly, a voice speaks from under him, near his feet, a small hedgehog that offers his help in return to the man upholding his promise. The hedgehog leads the merchant out of his predicament.

Next, a king also loses his way in the same woods, and, after five days, makes the same promise to marry one of his daughters to his possible saviour, and to give three sacks of coin as reward. The same hedgehog appears and guides the king out of the forest.

Thirdly, a poor man loses his way in the same forest, but prays to God to send him a liberator, and he promises to adopt them as his son. The same hedgehog appears and guides the poor man out of the woods. Some time later, the little animal knocks on the poor man's door one night and asks to be let in. The poor man, not knowing what to do, opens the door to the animal, wakes his wife and they prepare a bed for the hedgehog. The next morning, the family eats breakfast together, and the hedgehog asks his adoptive father to buy him a black rooster from an old woman and a ragged, torn saddle from a saddler, for the bird will be animal's mount.

The hedgehog rides on the rooster to the merchant's house to cash in on the man's promise and marry one of his daughters. The merchant welcomes the little animal and summons his daughters, and the hedgehog chooses the middle one, and gains three sacks of coins. They both ride to the poor man's hut, the hedgehog on the rooster and the girl in a carriage, crying all the way. The hedgehog asks her what is the matter, and she answers him she is marrying an animal. On hearing this, the hedgehog sends her back and keeps the money, which he gives to his adoptive father.

Next, he rides to the king's palace to court one of the princesses. The king calls his three daughters, explaining the situation to them, and the elder two refuse to marry the animal, save for the youngest, who agrees to keep her father's promise. On the way home, the princess rides in a carriage, asks the hedgehog why he is riding on the rooster, and invites him in, since he is her husband. Due to her kind words, the hedgehog changes himself to a golden-haired, golden-mouthed and golden-toothed prince, and the rooster into a golden-maned steed.

After the fortunate marriage, two of the merchant's daughters, save for the middle one, and the elder princess kill themselves by jumping into a well, in a hemp-pond, or in the river Tisza. The surviving girl promises to take revenge on the fortunate princess and her husband, and goes to the couple's new palace under the guise of an old woman. Most propitious, since the now human hedgehog was called to war against the Burkus king (Prussian king), leaving his pregnant wife alone. The merchant's second daughter helps in the delivery of the princess's children, twins (a boy and a girl), but puts them in a basket and abandons the royal babies in the forest, and deceives the princess that she gave birth to abominations the midwife had to put down in the river.

Back to the twins, a deer roaming the woods finds the basket and takes it to a river, then summons a Forest Maiden to look over them. After seven years, the Forest Maiden sends them to fetch water in jugs, but the twins accidentally break them and cry over the situation, fearing that their mother, the Forest Maiden, will punish them. A golden bird flying nearby says the Forest Maiden is not their mother, and promises to take them to their real parents.

When they reach adulthood, they are send on a quest for "the world-sounding tree", "the world-sweetly speaking bird" and "the silver lake [with] the golden fish".

== Analysis ==
=== Tale type ===
This tale is classified in the Hungarian Folktale Catalogue (Magyar népmesekatalógus, or MNK) as type 441 and type 707.

==== ATU 441: Hans My Hedgehog ====
The first part of the tale is classified in the Aarne-Thompson-Uther Index as ATU 441, "Hans My Hedgehog", a cycle of stories where the animal bridegroom is a porcupine, a pig or a hog. Other tales of this classification are Italian The Pig King, French Prince Marcassin and Romanian The Enchanted Pig (first part).

Polish philologist Mark Lidzbarski noted that the pig prince usually appears in Romance language tales, while the hedgehog as the animal husband occurs in Germanic and Slavic tales. Also, according to Swedish folklorist Waldemar Liungman and Christine Shojaei Kawan (in Enzyklopädie des Märchens), in type ATU 441 the animal husband may be a hedgehog, a wild boar or a porcupine. The Grimms' notes state that in these fairy tales, "Hedgehog, porcupine, and pig are here synonymous, like Porc and Porcaril". According to Hungarian scholar Ágnes Kovács, in Magyar Néprajzi Lexikon ("Hungarian Ethnographic Dictionary"), in Hungary, the son is born due to the rash desire of their mother in the shape of an animal, appearing like a snake, a pig, a hound or a foal (in type 425), or the poor old couple adopts the first animal that appears in their way: a hedgehog (in type 441).

==== ATU 707: The Three Golden Children ====
The second part of the tale (children born with special features) is tale type ATU 707, "The Three Golden Children". Hungarian scholarship classify the ATU 707 tale under the banner of "The Golden-Haired Twins" (Hungarian: Az aranyhajú ikrek). Variants collected in Hungary and Hungarian-language territories show parallels with similar tales from nearby regions, like Grimm's The Three Little Birds.

According to Hungarian-American scholar Linda Dégh, Hungarian variants may show two forms: the golden-haired sister rescues her golden-haired brothers and reveals the truth with the help of a truth-speaking bird, or the wonder children are helped by the Brother's fairy bride.

== Variants ==
=== Distribution ===
According to Swedish folklorist Waldemar Liungman and narrative researcher Ines Köhler-Zülch, tale type ATU 441 is reported in Germany, Baltic Countries, Hungary and among West Slavic and South Slavic peoples (although Liungman mentioned the existence of variants in Sweden, Greece, and Italy). The Hungarian Folktale Catalogue (MNK) registers 8 variants in Hungary indexed as type AaTh 441, A sündisznó ("The Hedgehog"), three of them combined with other types.

Ethnographer Ágnes Kovács commented that the tale type 707 is frequent and widespread in Hungarian-language areas. In the same vein, professor Linda Dégh stated that the national Hungarian Catalogue of Folktales (MNK) listed 28 variants of the tale type and 7 deviations. Fieldwork conducted in 1999 by researcher Zoltán Vasvári amongst the Palóc population found 3 variants of tale type 707.

=== Regional tales of type ATU 441 ===
==== The Hedgehog ====
In a Hungarian tale published by author Val Biro with the title The Hedgehog, a poor couple wish to have a son, but as the years pass by, they have no luck. One day, they decide to find any kind of animal in the forest they can adopt as their son. The man finds a hedgehog and brings it home to raise as their child. One day, the hedgehog begins to talk - much to the couple's surprise - and suggests they buy more pigs so he can become a swineherd and herd the pigs. They agree to it and let their hedgehog son herd the swine in the forest. Some time later, the Black King's retinue lose their way in the forest, and the hedgehog promises to help them, in exchange for the hand of the Black King's daughter. They sign a contract to mark their deal. The next day, the Red King's retinue also lose their way, and the little animal makes the same deal with him. On the third day, the White King also loses his way in the forest, and the hedgehog makes a third deal. Later, the hedgehog tells his parents he will go seek his bride, a princess. He goes first to the Black King's court and demands the princess as wife, and a dowry. When they are riding the coach, the hedgehog asks the princess if she loves the little animal, to which she gives a rude answer. Offended, he makes a return to the Black King's court and leaves the princess there, but takes the dowry for himself. The same events happen to the Red King's daughter, who says she does not love him. Finally, with the White King's daughter, she tells him she loves him, and he turns into a handsome prince. The prince explains he was under a spell, and marries the White King's daughter.

==== The Hedgehog (Alsó-Fehér) ====
In a Hungarian tale collected by Lázar István from a source in Alsó-Fehér County with the title A tevisdisznó ("The Hedgehog"), a man asks his wife to find them a son by going a certain direction in the forest, while he goes the other way, intent on finding any animal to be their son. The man finds a hedgehog and brings it home, but the animal is really a king in cursed form. In time, the hedgehog decides to become a pigkeeper, and asks his father to buys pigs for him, as well as a black and a white rooster. He blows a horn and takes the pigs to graze in the forest. Sometime later, the Black King loses his way in the woods, and the hedgehog offers his help, in exchange for his daughter and half of the kingdom. The next day, another king loses his way in the forest, and the hedgehog makes the same offer. Lastly, the White King and his wife lose their way in the woods, and the hedgehog appears to help them, by making the same offer. The following year, the hedgehog son asks his father to prepare some carriages and his rooster mount, for he intends to cash in the deals he made with each king. He goes first to the Black King's castle to remind him of his deal, and takes the princess as his bride. On the road, the hedgehog asks the princess if she loves him, and the girl rebuffs him. For this, he sends the girl back home and goes to try his luck with the second king's daughter, finding the same result. Finally, he goes to the White King's castle and takes the princess as his bride. The White King welcomes the hedgehog as his son-in-law and marries him to his daughter. Later at night, the hedgehog and the princess move out to another house, and the animal gives the princess a large knife, for her to stab him with it, since he has been cursed into animal form for years. Despite some reluctance, the princess does as asked, and turns the hedgehog back into human form. The now human prince explains to his parents he was the hedgehog, and the other two kings laments that he could not marry any of their daughters.

==== The Hedgehog and the Black Rooster (Bukovina) ====
In a tale collected from a Hungarian informant in Bukovina with the title A szőrdisznócska és a fekete kakas ("The Hedgehog and the Black Rooster"), a king goes to hunt in the forest until nightfall and loses his way. After three days, he calls for someone to help him and offers one of his three daughters in marriage. Suddenly, a hairy hedgehog appears at his feet and promises to help him. The king agrees and even increases the reward: three carriages in gold. The king is directed out of the forest and returns home, never mentioning a word of the incident to the princesses. A week later, a shopkeeper loses his way in the same forest and the little animal appears to him. The shopkeeper promises one of his daughters as reward to the little animal, plus carriages full of gold. Thirdly, a poor man loses his way in the same forest and calls someone to help him, and promises to adopt them as their son, even if they are a little animal. The hedgehog appears to the poor man wanting to be his son and helps him return home. A week later, the hedgehog knocks at the poor man's door and is welcomed by the man, but begrudgingly tended to by the man's wife. The hedgehog borrows two coins from his adoptive father and buys a black rooster as his mount, for he plans to get the bride the king and the shopkeeper promised him. The hedgehog goes to talk to the king, who explains the situation to his daughters and asks them which one will go with the animal: the elder two refuse, save for the youngest, who acknowledges that their father would not be there if not for the animal's help. The hedgehog then makes his way to the shopkeeper's house to remind him of his promise; the shopkeeper asks his daughters which one will marry the hedgehog, and only the youngest tearfully agrees. The hedgehog takes the shopkeeper's third daughter and notices she is crying nonstop, despite being their wedding, and the girl replies she would rather not marry such an animal. For this, the hedgehog sends her back to the shopkeeper's family, but retains the golden carriages which he gives to his adoptive family. Finally, he goes back to the princess and rides on the rooster next to the princess's carriage. The hedgehog notices the princess is not crying, and she explains it is her wedding day, a joyous occasion, and invites the little animal to ride in the carriage with her. He also questions the princess if she is not afraid, and she says she is not afraid of her bridegroom. Suddenly, the hedgehog turns into a human prince and the rooster into a horse, and the prince explains he was the little animal. Thus, they marry in a beautiful castle and live happily.

==== Tale of the Hedgehog (Egyházaskér-Verbica) ====
In a Yugoslavian-Hungarian tale collected by Olga Penavin from informant Tóth Mária, in Egyházaskér-Verbica, and titled Mese a sündisznóról ("Tale of the Hedgehog"), a poor man loses his way in the forest, and announces he would adopt the one who can rescue him, be it ugly or an animal. A hedgehog comes and rescues the man out of the forest, but he tells nothing to his wife. Later, a king loses his way in the forest and promises one of his daughters to anyone that can rescue him. The same hedgehog comes and rescues him, but he tell nothing to his daughters. The king then loses his way again in the forest while picking mushrooms and promises to sign a deal with his rescues, so the hedgehog appears again to rescue the monarch. Time passes, and the hedgehog knocks on the poor man's door to be adopted by him and his wife. After three years, the hedgehog sends his adoptive father to buy a black rooster in the market for some forints to serve as his mount. The little animal takes the rooster and rides to the king's castle to claim his reward. The king gives him gold and his elder daughter, but the girl refuses to go with him, so he takes the money home. The hedgehog returns a second time for another daughter, but she refuses, so the animal takes the dowry home. Lastly, the little animal goes a third time and asks for his bride, so the king's youngest daughter agrees to go with him. While they are on the road, the princess asks the hedgehog if he does not want to ride in the carriage with him, and he declines. When he arrives home, he turns into a prince, sends his adoptive father to buy nice clothes for him, and he marries the princess.

==== Hedgehog Prince (Gyöngyös) ====
In a dialectal Hungarian tale from Gyöngyös with the title Sündisznó királyfi ("Hedgehog Prince"), collected from informant Károlyné Berecz, beyond the Opperéncias Sea, a king loves to hunt, but one day his carriage sinks in the swamp. He tries to pull himself up, to no avail, when a hedgehog appears to him and promises to help him, in exchange for the princess. The hedgehog pulls the king's carriage and accompanies him to the palace, intent on claiming his reward. The king tricks the little animal into waiting another month so that the king can say his proper goodbyes to the princess, but locks her up a tower to keep her away from the hedgehog. A month later, the hedgehog appears with a coach pulled by a white dog and learns the princess has vanished, to the castle's sadness. Thus, the hedgehog goes to find his bride and, when the morning star rises, the coach becomes a carriage, the dog a white steed and the hedgehog a handsome prince. The prince finds his bride, the princess, and they ride together to their palace. Before they arrive, the Wind advises the girl to burn the animal skin. At night, the princess takes the hedgehog skin and burns it. The prince wakes up and thanks the princess for breaking his curse. They marry in a grand ceremony.

==== The Little Hedgehog (Karcsa) ====
In a dialectal Hungarian tale collected from teller Papai Istvánne, in Karcsa, Bodrogköz, with the title A sündisznócska ("The Little Hedgehog"), a poor man enters the woods to fetch firewood and fruits. One day, he loses his way while collecting berries and announces he will adopt anyone that can rescue him from the forest as his son. Suddenly, a little hedgehog appears near him and guides him out of the woods. Later at night, the little hedgehog knocks on the poor man's door and wishes to make true on his promise. The old man lets the animal in and asks his wife to help the hedgehog eat and prepare him a bed. The following morning, the hedgehog son asks his mother for money (three thalers) and sends him to buy a black rooster and a cart. The old woman buys the requests items, then the old man buys a pig for the hedgehog to graze. The hedgehog blows a horn and the pigs gather around him, which he takes to graze in the woods. Sometime later, a rich local innkeeper loses his way in the forest for two or three days and declares he will marry anyone that can save him to a daughter and give them two bags of gold. The hedgehog appears next to him and helps him out. Next, a king's carriage almost tramples the little hedgehog and loses its way in the woods. The hedgehog appears to him and promises to help, in exchange for the princess's hand and three bags of gold. The servants fumble around in trying to find some paper for the monarch to sign his promise, and the hedgehog takes his retinue out of the woods. Later, the hedgehog knocks on the innkeeper's door, intent on claiming his reward. As he knocks, the innkeeper asks his daughter which one will go with the hedgehog, but they all refuse. The innkeeper lets the hedgehog in, gives him the sacks of gold and shows him three girls, the cadette that one that strikes the hedgehog's fancy. On the road back, the girl cries nonstop, to the hedgehog's annoyance, who sends her back and keeps the money. Next, he tries his luck with the king and his daughters. The king gathers his daughters and asks which one will marry the little animal: the elder two princesses refuse, save for the youngest, who agrees to do it to spare her father. The monarch gives him a cartload of three sacks of gold and a carriage with the princess. As they ride on the road, the hedgehog keeps asking the princess if she loves him, to which she answers positively. The hedgehog jumps on her lap and she caresses his body, despite his prickly skin, and he asks her to kiss him. By doing this, he turns into a handsome prince. The prince takes the princess back to the king's castle and explains that an evil sorcerer cursed him into that form until someone loved him as he was and kissed him. The elder princesses feel jealous of their cadette, while the king arranges a grand wedding for his daughter.

==== The Three Princesses ====
In a Hungarian tale collected from an informant named Pápai Istvánné, in Karcsa, with the title A három királylány ("The Three Princesses"), a king has three daughters, the elder two too haughty and proud and the youngest virtuous. One day, he goes on a hunt and falls into a ravine, then falls even further into the underworld near a glass mountain when he tries to climb. He despairs that he might not see his daughters again, when a voice calls from up the hole, promising to help him if the king surrenders his eldest daughter. The king looks for the source of the voice and finds a hedgehog near him. Out of desperation, the king agrees, and he suddenly finds himself in front of his palace near the hedgehog. The king returns home, and one day tells his elder daughter he promised her to a bridegroom: not a fairy, but a hedgehog. Afraid at first, the elder princess agrees to marry the little animal, and goes to the palace atop the glass mountain. The hedgehog appears and welcomes her, and bids her join him in bed. The elder princess takes him to toss him on the bed, when his quills prickle her hand and cause her hand to bleed, then she falls into a cellar. Sometime later, the king loses his way again in the ravine and the hedgehog appears again, offering his help in exchange for the middle princess. The king agrees, and the hedgehog teleports him to the castle doors. The king then worries about his second deal with the animal, and the middle princess discuss with her father about the hedgehog as potential bridegroom, and takes a carriage to go to the glass palace. The middle princess falls through a rift and enters a silver palace. The hedgehog invites her in and bids her join him in bed, but the middle princess fears that the animal will prickle her skin. Still, she tries to place him on the bed, hurts her hand, and is also locked in the cellar. Lastly, the king goes on a hunt again, and decides not to reward the hedgehog anything. Still, the king falls into a ravine a third time, and his legs begin to turn to gold. The hedgehog appears and offers his help in getting the king out of his predicament in exchange for the youngest princess. The king chastises the animal for taking his two elder daughters and refuses to fulfill his request, but his upper torso turns to gold and the king relents. The hedgehog transports the monarch to his palace, but he still suffers with the golden legs, producing gold with every step. He returns home and cries for surrendering his remaining daughter to the hedgehog, but the princess agrees to marry the animal and learn the spell to reverse the golden transformation. The youngest princess goes to the hedgehog's lair and enters a golden palace. The hedgehog bids her join him in bed, and she gently places him on the bed, suffering the prickling of the quills, but caressing him. She falls asleep, and, the following morning, she finds a handsome prince next to her. The prince says he was the hedgehog, and the princess asks him about her father's golden curse and the location of her elder sisters. The prince explains the king's curse as soon as the hedgehog skin fell from his body, and that he threw the elder sisters in the cellars for their rough mishandling of him, but he agrees to let them go and suggests they marry his brothers, who are a frog and another hedgehog. The little animals appear and the youngest princess restores them to human form by caressing them. The now human hedgehog prince releases his sisters-in-law and they all marry their respective spouses.

==== Könykeresztség ====
In a tale collected by author György Gaal with the title Könykeresztség, a couple has no children, and the wife prays to God to have a child, even if he is a pig ("malac", in the original). Thus, a pig is born to them. The woman laments the fact her son is a pig, but the pig son says he can be useful to them by herding pigs in the forest. One day, a king loses his way in the forest, meets the porcine pigkeeper and promises his daughter if the pig helps him find his way out of the forest. The pig son does that. On another occasion, a second king loses his way in the same forest and makes a deal: his daughter's hand in marriage if the pig helps him. The same thing happens to a third king. Later, the pig asks his parents to fatten their family's rooster, which he uses as mount to visit the first king in order to cash in on his promise. The first king sends his daughter with a carriage loaded with money and a butler, but the butler and the princess plot to lose the pig, for his ugliness. The pig overhears their conversation, tosses them out of the carriage and steals the carriage to his parents. Secondly, the pig son rides to the second king in order to take the second princess as his bride, but the princess and her butler plot to lose the pig in the forest. The pig learns of their ploy, strips their clothes and steals the second carriage. Lastly, he goes to the third king and takes his daughter as bride. The third king has three daughters, and intends to fulfill his vow, so he asks his three daughters which will go with the hedgehog: the first two refuse, save for the youngest. As they are riding on the way back, the pig dismisses her butler and lies on her lap. The girl sheds a tear which falls on the pig, turning him into a human person. The now human hedgehog returns to his parents' house and explains that, if his mother had him baptized, he would have turned human, but a Christian tear has released him. The princess and her human husband then celebrate their marriage.

==== The Green Pig ====
In a Hungarian tale titled A zöld disznó ("The Green Pig"), a king has a prince that is wicked and terrible, killing little animals and birds. One day, he meets a woman fetching firewood for herself and orders her to leave his forested dominions. The woman begs to let her have the firewood, but he beats her, so he curses him to wander the forest in the shape of a green pig until a princess kisses him. The prince then turns into a green pig. Some time later, a kind princess from a nearby kingdom asks her father to let them take a carriage ride in the same forest, but lose their way. Suddenly, they hear a metallic sound: it is the green pig, come to offer his help in exchange for the princess's hand. The king agrees, and the green pig leads them out of the forest. The pig takes a wheelbarrow and goes to the king's castle to take his bride. Despite his reluctance, the prince takes the princess with him to his barn, then asks her to prepare their bed and to kiss him. The green pig kisses the princess and she swoons. The following morning, the princess wakes up and finds herself not in a barn, but inside a castle, and the pig is now a prince. The prince explains his curse was due to his bad deeds, and takes the princess to her father, who has been mourning her absence. The king rejoices at his daughter's return.

=== Regional tales of type ATU 707 ===
According to scholarship, the oldest variant of tale type 707 in Hungary was registered in 1822. This tale was published by György von Gaal in his German language book Mährchen der Magyaren with the title Die Drillinge mit den Goldhaar ("The Triplets with Golden Hair"): the baker's three daughters, Gretchen, Martchen and Suschen each profess their innermost desire: the youngest wants to marry the king, for she will bear him two princes and one princess, all with golden hair and a golden star shining on the forehead.

Elek Benedek collected the second part of the story as an independent tale named Az Aranytollú Madár ("The Golden-Feathered Bird"), where the children are reared by a white deer, a golden-feathered bird guides the twins to their house, and they seek "the world-sounding tree", "the world-sweetly speaking bird" and "the silver lake [with] the golden fish".

In a third variant, A Szárdiniai király fia ("The Son of the King of Sardinia"), the dying King of Sardinia makes his son promise to find a suitable queen. In his travels, he and his butler pass by three princesses in a garden: the oldest says she can weave strong enough clothes for the entire army that would never tear up, the second one that she can make a bread of corn to feed the army, and the youngest sister promises golden-haired twins, a boy with the sun on his forehead, and a girl with a star on the front. A creature named Kuvik, the "bird of death", takes the children as soon as they are born and throws them in the sea. The pair is saved by a fisherman and his wife. Years later, they decide to seek their true parents and meet a beggar man on the road, to whom they give alms. Seeing their good heart, the beggar summons a supernatural helper to guide them. Kuvik then convinces the twins to seek a mirror that can see the whole world. Later, they go to the public square to tend to and bathe their mother, sewn in seven buffalo skins and exposed.

In another Hungarian tale, A tizenkét aranyhajú gyermek ("The Twelve Golden-Haired Children"), the youngest of three sisters promises the king to give birth to twelve golden-haired boys. This variant is unique in that another woman also gives birth to twelve golden-haired children, all girls, who later marry the twelve princes.

In the tale A tengeri kisasszony ("The Maiden of the Sea"), the youngest sister promises to give birth to an only child with golden hair, a star on his forehead and a moon on his chest. The promised child is born, but cast into the water by the cook. The miller finds the boy and raises him. Years later, the king, on a walk, takes notice of the boy and adopts him, which was consented by the miller. When the prince comes to court, the cook convinces the boy to search for "the bird that drinks from the golden and silver water, and whose singing can be heard from miles", the mirror that can see the whole world and the Maiden of the Sea.

Another version, Az aranyhajú gyermekek ("The Golden-Haired Children"), skips the introduction about the three sisters: the queen gives birth to a boy with a golden star on the forehead and a girl with a small flower on her arm. They end up adopted by a neighbouring king and an old woman threatens the girl with a cruel punishment if the twins do not retrieve the bird from a cursed castle.

In the tale A boldogtalan királyné ("The Unhappy Queen"), the youngest daughter of a carpenter becomes a queen and bears three golden-haired children, each with a star on their foreheads. They are adopted by a fisherman; the boys become fine hunters and venture into the woods to find a willow tree, a talking bird on a branch and to collect water from a well that lies near the tree.

In Tündér Ilona és az aranyhajú fiú; or Fee Ilona und der goldhaarige Jüngling ("Fairy Ilona and the golden-haired Youth"), of the Brother quests for a Bride format, the Sister is told by an old lady about the wonderful belongings of the fabled Fairy Ilona (Ilona Tünder) and passes this information to her brother as if she saw them in a dream.

In the tale Jankalovics, the youngest sister, a herb-gatherer, promises the king twin children with golden hair. When the twins are cast out in the water, they are rescued by a miller. In their youth, they find out they are adopted and leave the miller's home to seek out their origins. During their travels, they give alms to three beggars and they reward the twins by summoning a creature named Jankalovics to act as the twins' helper.

In the tale Az aranyhajú hármasok ("The Triplets with Golden-Hair"), the baker's youngest daughter gives birth to triplets with golden hair and a star on the forehead. The usual story follows, but the older male twins meet the king during a hunt, who invites the youths three times for a feast. In the third time, the truth is revealed in front of the whole court.

Bishop János Kriza (hu) collected another version, Aranyhajú Kálmán ("Golden-Haired Kálman"), wherein the youngest sister promises the king an only son with golden hair. Years later, the boy, Kalman, quests for a magical tree branch, a mirror that can see the whole world and Világlátó, the world-famed beauty.

In the tale Az aranyhajú királyfiak ("The King's Sons with Golden Hair"), collected by Elek Benedek, the youngest sister promises the king two golden-haired boys. They are born and a witch from the king's court casts them in the water. They are saved and grow up as fine youths. The king sees them one day and invites them for a dinner at the castle. The witch, then, sends both of the brothers in a series of quests: to bathe in the water of the Sun, to dry themselves with the cloth/towel of the Sun and to see themselves in the Sun's mirror. The brothers are helped by incarnations of Friday, Holy Saturday and the Holy Sunday. The tale was translated into French by Michel Klimo with the title Les Deux Princes aux Cheveux d'Or, albeit with some differences: the twins are already born by the time the king goes to war and has to leave his wife.

In a tale collected by Gyula Ortutay from storyteller Mihály Fedics, and published in 1940, Az aranyhajú két testvér ("The Two Siblings with Golden Hair"), a prince and a servant take a journey through distant lands and pass by three women, who express their wishes to marry the king based on their great skills in weaving and cooking. The third, however, promises to bear two children with golden hair, unlike any other seen in the world. The prince marries the third woman and she gives birth to two children. The midwife, the iron-nosed witch, takes the babies to be trampled by the cows, the horses, and the sows, but they are suckled by the female ones. The witch then casts them in a box in the sea. The box is saved by a poor fisherman and his wife, who sell their golden hair to earn money. After leaving their adoptive home, the sister wants her brother to search for "three lilac leaves that produce music", a world-seeing mirror, and the worldly beautiful Erzsók as a bride for him and companion for her.

In a similarly named tale collected in 1976 with the title Az aranyhajú ikrek ("The Golden-Haired Twins"), a queen gives birth to her two golden-haired children while the king is away, but the midwife replaces the babies for animals and throws them in the water. The twins are saved by a fisherman, meet the king years later and are invited for a feast with their father in the castle, where the midwife tries to poison them.

In the tale Az aranyhajú gyermekek ("The Golden-Haired Children"), collected from Hungarian-Romani teller János Cifra, a king dies and orders a nurse to take care of the prince. One day, the prince goes for a walk in his carriage and three bathing maidens see him. Each of them wanted the prince to fetch their garment, and the third says that if the prince gets hers, she will marry him and bear golden-haired children, a boy with the sunlight and two stars on the forehead and a girl with the moonlight and one star on the front. The prince marries this girl. One day, he goes to war and leaves his wife under a midwife's care, who replaces the twins for puppies. The children are cast in the water, but survive and are saved by a miller. They are expelled from home, but meet a friendly old man on their way, who gives them means to build a castle and a black-coloured helper named Vasbug. The evil midwife visits the pair and convinces the girl to ask for a golden palm tree and a golden finch on a golden cage. The brother also happens to find the fairy Tündér Ilona, who claims she is destined to become his bride and join him in the mortal world.

In the tale Világvámosa ("The Toll-Keeper of the World"), collected from teller János Puji, in Marosszentkirály (Sâncraiu de Mureș) by ethnographer Olga Nagy (hu) and published in 1978, a prince that is single wishes to marry a girl that can give him two golden-haired children. One day, he is riding near the hemp fields where three women are cutting hemp and talking, and one of them says she ill bear two golden-haired children, a boy and a girl. This woman is chosen by the king as his wife. A jealous witch puts the woman's head in a chimney to cloud her vision while she takes the twins and casts them in the sea in a box. The children are saved by a miller, but one day they are expelled from their adoptive home for breaking a jar. On the way, they meet a beggar asking for alms. The twins give him alms. Because of their good heart, the beggar summons a creature named Vasbug to help the twins in their quest for their true parents. Vasbug summons a castle for them, and the witch visits them to set them on a quest for a branch of the Reverbing Tree from the Dark World, a bird that sings Twelve Masses, and destined spouses for each of them: a man named Villámlás (Lightning), located in the Dark World, and a fairy woman named Tündér Ilona.

In a tale collected from teller István Babos, in Babócsa, and published in 2003 with the title Az aranyfogú és az aranyhajú gyerek ("The Children with Golden Teeth and Golden Hair"), a poor woman's three daughters go to the fields to cut and gather hemp. They see the king riding on his horse and a retinue and state their wishes, the youngest saying that if she marries the king, she will bear him golden-toothed and golden-haired children. The king decides to make this woman his wife and marries her. However, the sorcerous royal cook replaces the twins for puppies and throws them in the sea. They survive. Years later, the cook visits them and convinces the girl to seek a golden apple tree, which yields golden fruits on one side and golden flowers on the other, and a magical cookbook. He gets both objects with the help of a dwarf. However, the brother burns the cookbook and brings home with him an old magical woman who reveals the truth to the king during a banquet.

==== Subtypes ====
Hungarian compilations also attest two other narratives of type ATU 707: a set of stories where the king's wife bears twins who are buried in the ground and go through a cycle of transformations (akin to Romanian The Boys with the Golden Stars); and another cycle, wherein mother and son are thrown in the sea in a barrel (akin to Russian The Tale of Tsar Saltan).

===== Boys with the Golden Stars form =====
In the tale Die zwei goldhaarigen Kinder (Hungarian: "A két aranyhajú gyermek"; English: "The Two Children with Golden Hair"), of The Boys With Golden Stars format. The tale begins akin to tale type ATU 450, "Brother and Sister", wherein the boy drinks from a puddle and becomes a deer, and his sister is found by the king during a hunt. The sister, in this variant, begs the king to take her, for she will bear him twin sons with golden hair. After the twin boys are born, they are buried in the ground and go through a cycle of transformations, from golden-leaved trees, to lambs to humans again. When they assume human form, the Moon, the Sun and the Wind give them clothes and shoes. This tale was collected in Pürkerec.

Another of the first group is A mosolygó alma ("The Smiling Apple"), a king sends his page to pluck some fragrant scented apples in a distant garden. When the page arrives at the garden, a dishevelled old man appears and takes him into his house, where the old man's three young daughters live. The daughters comment among themselves their marriage wishes: the third wishes to marry the king and give him two golden-haired children, one with a "comet star" on the forehead and another with a sun.

In the tale A mostoha királyfiakat gyilkoltat, the step-parent asks for the organs of the twin children to eat. They are killed, their bodies are buried in the garden and from their grave two apple trees sprout. Later, the two children become lambs and finally regain human form.

In the tale Az aranyhajú ikrek ("The Golden-Haired Children"), published in 1987, the king overhears the conversation between three women that are cutting grass, the third one saying that she will bear two golden-haired children to him. The king marries her and she gives birth to her children, a boy and a girl, but an iron-nosed witch takes the babies and buries them in the garden. The twins sprout as golden pine trees that are felled to become beds; the beds are burned, but two sparks fly out and become two golden-fleeced lambs. The witch orders them to be killed and their fleece to be washed in the river, but two strands of hair are washed away by the current and become the twins again.

===== Tale of Tsar Saltan form =====
Of the second group is Nád Péter ("Schilf-Peter"): the only son of a king wishes to join his father's twelve hunters in the hunt. His father agrees and lets him go; on the way, three princesses from another kingdom see the prince and express their wishes to marry him, the youngest saying that if she becomes his wife, she will bear him 12 golden-haired sons. The prince and the third princess marry, and she gives birth to her fabled sons. Her sisters forge a letter with a command to kill the queen and throw her sons in the sea in a box. Eleven boys are cast in one box, and the youngest is cast with his mother in another. Mother and son wash ashore on an island and are helped by St. Peter and Christ. This tale was sourced from Szováta, in Székely Land.

== See also ==
- The Enchanted Prince Who was a Hedgehog
