= The Pretty Little Calf =

Chinese fairy tale

"The Pretty Little Calf" is a Chinese fairy tale collected by Wolfram Eberhard in "Folktales of China". It is related to the theme of the calumniated wife and to the tale type ATU 707, "The Three Golden Children", of the international Aarne-Thompson-Uther Index, in that a woman gives birth to children of wondrous aspect, but jealous relatives conspire to separate them. Similar stories are attested in East Asian literature, specially Mongolian and Korean, wherein the boy is murdered, but is later reborn in the shape of a calf.

== Translations ==
The tale was also translated as The Piebald Calf.

== Synopsis ==
An official without children leaves home to take a new post. His first wife promised him gold on his return; the second, silver; the third, a son. He was pleased with the third wife, but the other wives were jealous. When she bore a son, they claimed she had borne a lump of flesh; the first wife threw the baby into a pond, but he floated, and so the second wife had him wrapped in straw and grass and fed to a water buffalo. When the official returned, his first wife gave him gold, the second silver, but when he heard that his third wife had borne a horrid lump of flesh, he sentenced her to grind rice in a mill.

The water buffalo gave birth to a beautiful calf with a hide like gold. It was fond of its master, who always gave it some of his food. One day, the official said that if it understood human speech, it should bring the dumplings he gave it to its mother. The calf brought them not to the water buffalo but to the repudiated wife. The first two wives realized that it was the son. They claimed to be ill; the first wife said she needed to eat the calf's liver, and the second, that she needed the calf's skin. The official let the calf loose in the woods and bought another to kill.

A woman named Huang had announced she would throw a coloured ball from her house, and whoever caught it would be her husband. The calf caught it on its horn. Miss Huang realized that she had to marry it. She hung the wedding robes on its horns, and it ran off. She chased it and found a young man in wedding robes by a pond; he told her to come. She said she had to find her calf, and he told her that he was the transformed calf. He went back to his father and told him the truth. The official was ready to kill his first two wives; his son persuaded him to pardon them, but he had his son bring back his mother from the mill.

== Analysis ==
=== Tale type ===
The tale is classified in the international Aarne-Thompson-Uther Index as type ATU 707, "The Three Golden Children". This folktype contains the motif of the calumniated wife: a girl promises her husband to bear children with wonderful aspect, but her persecutors (usually her sisters) replace the children for puppies to humiliate her.

In the first catalogue of Chinese folktales (devised by Eberhard in 1937), Wolfram Eberhard abstracted a Chinese folktype he indexed as number 33, Der Verwandelte Knabe ("The Transformed Boy"): evil co-wives try to kill the man's youngest wife's child by feeding him to the cow; the cow gives birth to a calf; the calf escapes to another kingdom, marries a human princess and changes back to human form. Eberhard based its typing on a tale published in a book from Jiangsu. The author of the Jiangsu book noted that the tale seemed to hark back to a story of a concubine from the annals of the Song Dynasty.

=== Motifs ===
Some of the story's motif has similarities with stories from "One Thousand and One Nights", namely "Tale of the Trader" and the "Jinni".

The story also contains the motif of the marital transformation, which also appears in European tales of the Animal as Bridegroom cycle of stories, such as "Hans My Hedgehog", "The Pig King" and "The Donkey".

== Variants ==
=== Literary history ===
Scholarship points that in a compilation of Buddhist teachings dated to the 14th century, titled Shijia rulai shidi xiuxing ji, there exists a story about a king whose third wife gives birth to a boy, and his jealous co-wives replace the baby with a skinned cat and even try to kill him, to no avail. Finally, they give the baby to a cow that eats it, and lie to their husband that the third wife gave birth to a monster. The cow gives birth to a calf (a golden calf in many versions), to which the king takes a liking to, to the horror of the two co-wives. They feign some illness and persuade the king to kill the little calf as cure for them, but the royal butcher spares its life, killing another animal in its place. The calf escapes to another kingdom (Korea), grows up and marries a princess. The calf regains human shape and rescues his mother. This tale can also be known as The Golden Calf, The Calf with the Golden Horns and Silver Hooves or The Marriage of the Calf.

Sinologist Wilt Idema states that the earliest appearance of the story is a Buddhist tract titled Foshuo xiaoshunzi xiuxing chengfo jing ("The sutra on how a filial and obedient son achieved Buddhahood by self-cultivation, preached by the Buddha"), dated to the 6th century, since it is mentioned in a catalogue titled Zhongjing mulu, published in 602. Some of its contents were discovered among the Dunhuang manuscripts, but in fragments dated to the 8th century.

=== Asia ===
Other tales about Prince Golden Calf are attested in historical literature of Taiwan, Manchuria and Mongolia. They contain very similar plot structures: birth of hero by third wife or concubine, the attempts on the young prince by the other wives, his rebirth as a golden-horned and silver-hooved calf (with some difference between versions), his escape to another kingdom, his marriage to a human princess; his transformation to human and eventual return to his homeland.

==== China ====
According to Wilt Idema, the tale is "popular" among the Han Chinese, Manchus, Mongols and Muslims, and the "majority" of its oral variants have been collected from Northern China. In addition, the tale is known in Chinese scholarship as The Calf Marries a Wife (Chinese: 牛犢娶親 Niudu quqin).

Researcher Juwen Zhang published a Chinese tale titled The Calf Got a Wife. In this tale, a minister has two wives, who have not born any children. In hopes of having a child, he marries a third wife, but he is still unlucky. In his fifties, one day, he has to go away on business for six months, and three wives assure him they will welcome him with gifts: the first promises to have with her a bouquet of peonies; the second a bouquet of roses, and the third promises him a son, since she is pregnant. After their husband leaves, the first two wives worry they will lose favour with him and begin to plot against their co-wife. As soon as the baby, a boy, is born, the two co-wives take him throw him in the kennel, to be bitten to shreds by a she-dog. Their plan fails: the co-wives see the she-dog suckling the baby. They decide to kill him and bury him in the garden. The third wife cries over her lost baby, and the other two force her to work in the fields pushing the millstone. Back to the baby, a grass grows on his grave and a cow eats it, giving birth later to a calf. The calf begins to help the third wife in the millstone. The minister comes back home and the first two co-wives report their co-spouse lost the baby, so they bring her in to be beaten and scolded by him. The minister, however, seeing her sorry state, can only feel sympathy for her. After his return, the little calf becomes increasingly close to the minister, and the two co-wives suspect something, so they pretend to be ill and ask for the calf's heart as remedy. The minister reluctantly decides to fulfill their joint request and sharpens a knife. The calf escapes and the man follows after him. The minister decides to spare the calf and lets him go, and promises to buy a cow's heart in the market to give his wives. Some time later, the calf wanders to a wild land. A girl, the daughter of the Celestial Minister, comes with a retinue of maidens and they play with it. The girl make references to the story of The Cowherd and the Weaving Girl: the calf is the cowherd, and they decide to see who will be the "Weaving Maiden" by playing a game to throw handkerchiefs on the calf's horns. The calf deflects every handkerchief but the minister's daughter's, who is declared to be the calf's "Weaving Girl", but she answers that he would marry him if he was human. The girl and her friends go back home, followed by the calf. In her chambers, the girl notices the calf is there, and he becomes a man, granting her her previous wish. The girl and the now human calf marry, with the girl's father's blessings. Some time later, the old minister (the calf's father) is having a birthday event, and the girl and her husband go in the Celestial Minister's stead, to pay his respects. During the celebration, the old minister suggests a show or a story to tell to liven up the event, and the now human calf has a story: he begins to tell the story of his mother, his father, and the two co-wives. The old minister learns the truth.

==== Korea ====
According to scholarship, the Buddhist tale of the birth of the Golden Calf "became wide-spread in Korea", with the earliest printed edition dating back to 1329 (during the reign of King Chungsuk of Goryeo). The tale is also known as Kŭmu t'aejajŏn (金牛太子傳; "The Life of Prince Golden Calf"); Kŭmsongajijŏn (금송아지전; "Story of the Golden Calf"), 환생한 송아지 신랑 ("The Reincarnated Calf as a Groom"), 금우태자전 ("Crown Prince Geumwoo"), Kūmu t’aeja chŏn ("The Story of Crown Prince Golden Calf"), Geumdoktaeja ("Golden Calf Son") and 금송아지로 태어난 아들 ("Son Reborn as Golden Calf").

Russian Sinologist Pavel V. Shkurkin translated a Korean tale into Russian with the title "Кым шэ ацзи" or "Золотой теленок" (Korean: Geum ela aji; English: "Golden Calf"). In this tale, a man named Pak has two wives, Chhye-bi and Che. One day, Pak has to go on a journey, and asks his co-wives what they will bring him when he returns: the elder co-wife promises to greet him with a feast, while the younger promises to bear him a son. Time passes, and, just before Pak returns, Che gives birth to a boy, which is taken by Chhye-bi and given to some servants to be killed. The elder co-wife's servants try to kill the boy: first, they throw him in a well, but, when they return, some wild animals have rescued him; next, they throw the child under the pigs to be devoured, but the pigs spare him. Running out of options, they cook the boy with oil in a pot, and throw the broth away. A cow finds the broth and eats a piece of it, becoming pregnant and giving birth to a calf with golden fur. Pak returns home, and his elder co-wife tells him that Che gave away his son. For this affront, Pak locks Che in a cell in the basement. Meanwhile, the golden-furred calf begins to draw the attention of Pak, which greatly distresses Chhye-bi, since the little animal is evidence of her wicked deed. Thus, she feigns illness and asks Pak to kill the calf and cook its heart as remedy. An old woman lets the calf go and gives a dog's heart in its place. As for the golden calf, he flees and goes to the imperial city, where the emperor set up a suitor test: whoever wishes to marry his youngest daughter shall jump high and ring the gong. The golden calf, being an animal, jumps very high and beats the gong, to the emperor's surprise. He marries his youngest daughter to the calf, and they move out to their own palace. The calf takes off the calfskin and becomes a man at night. At the end of the tale, the now human golden calf pays a visit to Pak, his own father, to tell him the truth. Pak releases his wife Che, restoring her as his wife, and locks Chhye-bi in the cellar.

==== Mongolia ====
According to scholarship, in the Mongolian version of Prince Golden Calf, the third queen gives birth to a boy with golden chest and silver backside. When the two jealous queens give the boy for the cow to eat it, the cow gives birth to a similarly coloured calf. The calf regains human form, returns to his father's palace and denounces the queens' deceit. In addition, professor Charles R. Bawden stated that the theme of the calumniated wife appears in Mongolian tradition with the motif of the son's rebirth by a cow. In the same vein, Hungarian orientalist László L. Lőrincz established the classification of the Mongolian tale corpus, published as Mongolische Märchentypus ("MMT"). In his system, he indexed a similar tale as type 141, Das wunderbare Kalb ("The Wonderful Calf"): the khan has three or more wives, and the third or last one gives birth to his son; the co-wives kill the boy and replace him for a puppy, and try to hide the body; the boy is reborn as a cow's calf, so the co-wives, recognizing the boy animal as the boy's incarnation, convince the khan to kill it by feigning illness; the calf escapes, turns into a boy and returns to his father's court to unmask the wicked co-wives.

Bawden also provided the summary of a tale recorded in Inner Mongolia: the three queens promise similar things. When the third one gives birth to the boy with golden breast and silver buttocks, they bury the boy under the threshold of the tent and replace him for kittens. After the king returns and demotes the third queen to a simple maid, the two queens dig up the boy and throw him in the well. When horsemen complain about the well, the two women draw the boy up, cook him up and give the broth for the cow to eat. The cow later gives birth to a calf, which becomes the king's pet. The two queens want its liver as remedy for their false illness. When the calf is ready to be killed, the axe breaks the transformation and disenchants him to normal human form. This tale was also published in longer form with the title Jagar Büritü-yin Khagan, which Bawden understood to mean "Khan of All in India".

==== Daur people ====
In a tale from the Daur people titled The Golden-Backed, Silver-Chested Boy, a man named Jeardi Mergen has three wives. One day, he is ready to go on a hunt, and asks each of his three wives what they will prepare him when he returns: the first promises to sew a marten skin coat with 72 buttons; the second that she will a pair of buck skin boots, and the third wife, pregnant, promises that their child will be a boy with golden back and silver chest. Jeardi Mergen orders his elder wives to take care of the third one, and leaves for the hunt. Months later, the third wife gives birth to her son, but the two co-wives take the boy and put a baby in his place. The women kill the boy, boil him in a brew and feed a cow with it. When Jeardi Mergen goes back home, he sees a puppy instead of a human son, and forces his third wife to work in the kitchen. Some time later, the cow gives birth to a silver chest and golden backed calf, which Jeardi Mergen notices it reminds him of his unborn son. The elder co-wives then feign illness and ask for the little calf to be sacrificed. The calf is saved by Bainasta, a deity of the mountains and protector of animals, (Note: Sinologist Victor H. Mair and Mark Bender explain that this deity, also known as "Bainaaqaa", is a mountain god and protector of animals that appears in Daur folktales.) who whisks the little animal to the mountains and turns him back into human form. The deity tells the boy about his father's co-wives' plot, and sends him away to an elderly couple. Later, Jeardi Mergen meets with the boy on a hunt, and listens to his story. Jeardi invites the boy to his house for a meal, where he tells the whole story.

== See also ==
- The Crown Prince Replaced by a Cat

== Bibliography ==
- Eberhard, Wolfram, ed. (1965) [1937]. Folktales of China. University of Chicago Press. ISBN 9780226181936.
- Idema, Wilt L.; Olof, Allard M. The Legend of Prince Golden Calf in China and Korea. Cambria Press, 2021. ISBN 9781621967019.
- Shahar, Meir (2025). "Part II The Ox King". Kings of Oxen and Horses: Draft Animals, Buddhism, and Chinese Rural Religion. New York Chichester, West Sussex: Columbia University Press. pp. 119-272 [203-208]. doi:10.7312/shah21828-005.
