= Matthew Drutt =

American curator and writer (born 1962)

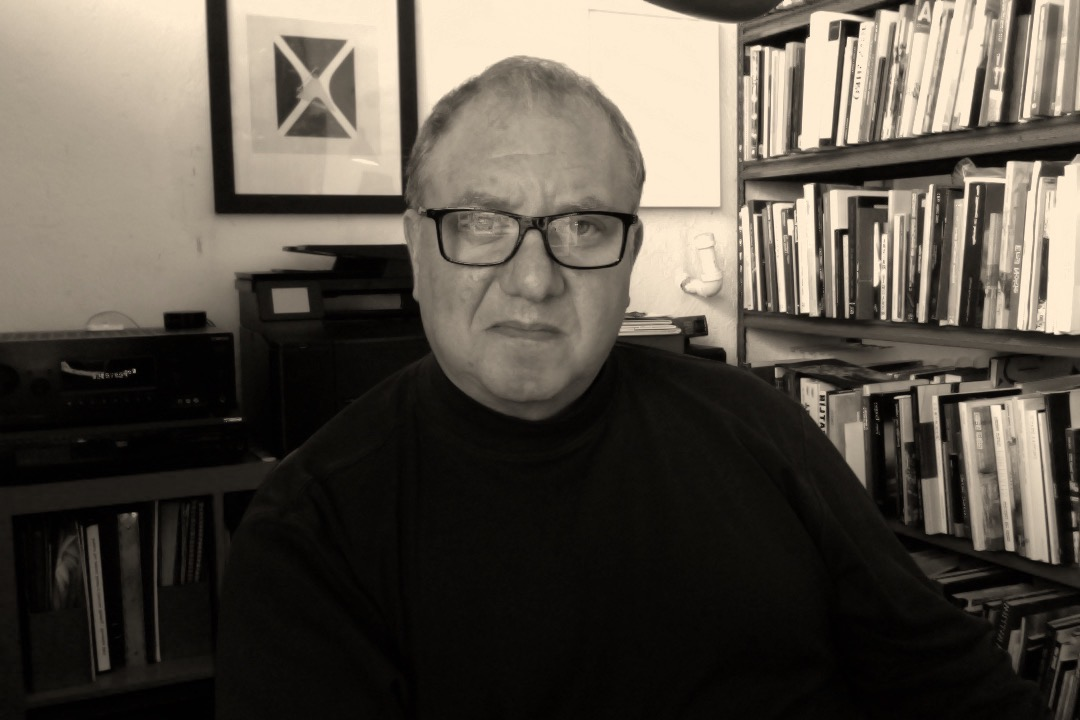
- Matthew Drutt ca. 2019
- Born: Matthew Joseph Williams Drutt; December 8, 1962 (age 63); Philadelphia, Pennsylvania, U.S
- Education: New York University, Yale University
- Occupations: curator, editor, author
- Writing career
- Language: English
- Notable awards: Chevalier, Order of Arts and Letters, 2006
- Website: druttcam.com

Matthew Joseph Williams Drutt (born December 8, 1962) is an American curator and writer who specializes in modern and contemporary art and design. Based in New York, he has owned and operated his independent consulting practice Drutt Creative Arts Management (DCAM) since 2013. He is currently working with the Lee Ufan Foundation in Arles on an exhibition of non-objective art for Fall 2024. More recently, he worked with the Nationalmuseum Stockholm on an exhibition and publication (2022 - 2023) of modern and contemporary American crafts gifted from artists and collectors in the United States to the museum, originally organized by his mother, Helen Drutt. He has worked more recently with the Eckbo Foundation in Oslo on the first major monograph of Thorwald Hellesen published in English and Norwegian in (2019 - 2022) by Arnoldsche Art Publishers. He is currently also developing several other titles with the publisher. Formerly, he worked with the Beyeler Foundation in Switzerland (2013–2016) and the State Hermitage Museum in Russia (2013–2014), consulting on exhibitions, publications, and collections. He continues to serve as an Advisory Curator to the Hermitage Museum Foundation Israel. In 2006, the French Government awarded him the Chevalier de l'Ordre des Arts et des Lettres, and in 2003, his exhibition Kazimir Malevich: Suprematism won Best Monographic Exhibition Organized Nationally from the International Association of Art Critics.

== Early life, education ==
Matthew Drutt was born on December 8, 1962, in Philadelphia, Pennsylvania, and is the son of Helen Drutt, an educator, gallerist, and collector of international contemporary crafts. He received his B.A. degree cum laude from New York University in 1986 with a double major in History of Art and Russian Studies, and earned an M.A. degree from Yale University in 1987, also with a double concentration in both areas.

== Career ==
From 1993 to 2001, he was a curator at the Solomon R. Guggenheim Museum, where he organized shows such as Amazons of the Avant-Garde, The Art of the Motorcycle in 1998, Mediascape in 1996, Josef Albers in 1995, and Frank Lloyd Wright in 1994. He was Chief Curator of The Menil Collection in Houston from 2001 to 2006, where he organized exhibitions of Robert Gober, Ellsworth Kelly, Olafur Eliasson, Donald Judd, Anna Gaskell, and Vik Muniz, as well as collection-based projects.

In 1999, Drutt organized the exhibit Bill Fontana: Acoustical Visions of Venice for the 48th Venice Biennale in cooperation with The Bohen Foundation, and in 2011 he returned to curate Anton Ginzburg: At The Back of the North Wind for the 54th Venice Biennale.

Among his exhibition catalogs are Kazimir Malevich: Suprematism, an exhibit centered on Russian artist Kazimir Malevich, who had founded the avant-garde Suprematist movement in the early 1900s. It was published by Harry N. Abrams, Inc. in 2003. The exhibition won Best Monographic Exhibition Organized Nationally from the International Association of Art Critics.

From 2006 to 2010, he was executive director of the international artist residency program Artpace in San Antonio, where he produced solo exhibitions of artists Kehinde Wiley, David Adjaye, Kate Gilmore, and Nathan Carter, among others. In 2010, he also curated the yearlong exhibition Felix Gonzalez-Torres: Billboards, the first show devoted to this artist's public work in depth. After this, he was executive director of Lisson Gallery in London, Milan, and New York, where he oversaw its international sales of artists, including Daniel Buren, Tony Cragg, Ryan Gander, Dan Graham, Shirazeh Houshiary, Anish Kapoor, Jason Martin, Jonathan Monk, and Lawrence Weiner. From 2012 to 2013, he was the founding executive director of the Blouin Cultural Advisory Group, and was curator for the Louise Blouin Foundation in London, where he organized exhibitions of work by Chris Marker in 2012 and Olga de Amaral in 2013.

He has also served as a visiting professor at Columbia University in both the Graduate School of the Arts and the Avery School of Architecture and at the Fashion Institute of Technology.

=== Boards and committees ===
Drutt serves on numerous boards and committees. He was chair of the Arts Committee for LongHouse Reserve from 2018 - 2020 and he was a founding member of the El Lissitzky Foundation in Eindhoven from 2013 to 2019. He was on the advisory board of the Hermitage Museum Foundation from 2012 to 2015 and The Fabric Workshop and Museum's artist advisory board since 2010. Previously, he was on the advisory boards of the American Academy in Berlin, American Academy in Rome, and Documenta in Kassel, Germany. He was a chair for Luminaria: Arts Night in San Antonio and the American Association of Museum Directors. He had also worked with both Public Art San Antonio and Etant donnés: The French-American Fund for Contemporary Art.

=== Recognition ===
In 2006, the French Government awarded him the Chevalier de l'Ordre des Arts et des Lettres for accomplishments in the international art world. In 2003, his exhibition, Kazimir Malevich: Suprematism, received the award for Best Monographic Exhibition Organized Nationally from the International Association of Art Critics, who also awarded him 2nd place in 1996 in the same category for Max Beckmann in Exile.

== Exhibitions ==
The following is a collection of approximately one third the exhibits Drutt has organized:

- Philadelphia: Then and Now. 1950 - 2019, Globe Dye Works, Philadelphia, November 2019
- Jewelry in America, Galerie Wittenbrink, Munich, March 2018
- In Search of 0,10: The Last Futurist Exhibition of Painting, Fondation Beyeler, Riehen, Switzerland, October 2015 – January 2016
- Million Stone: An Installation by Ahmet Güneştekin, La Pietà, La Biennale di Venzia – 56th International Art Exhibition, May – November 2015
- Gifts from America 1948 – 2013. Modern and Contemporary Applied Arts from the Hermitage Museum Foundation, State Hermitage Museum, St. Petersburg, December 2014 – June 2015
- Olga de Amaral: Recent Work, Louise Blouin Foundation, London, October 2013
- Chris Marker. Selected Works: 1951–2011, Louise Blouin Foundation, London. October–November 2012
- Anton Ginzburg: At the Back of the North Wind, 54th Venice Biennale, June–November, 2011
- Gabriel Vormstein: The Teeth of the Wind and the Sea, Artpace San Antonio, January–May 2011Mediascape, Guggenheim Museum Soho, June 14 – September 15, 1996
- Matthew Ronay: Between the Worlds, Artpace San Antonio, September 2010 – January 2011. Traveled to Andrea Rosen Gallery, New York June 24 - August 19, 2011 and La Conservera, Murcia, Spain, February–July 2012.
- Felix Gonzalez-Torres: Billboards, Artpace San Antonio, January–December 2010. A year-long, statewide exhibition featuring the work of one of Artpace's most renowned residents held on the occasion of the institution's 15th anniversary
- Robert Gober: The Meat Wagon, The Menil Collection, Houston, October 2005 – January 2006
- Ellsworth Kelly: Tablet, The Menil Collection, Houston, February–May 2005
- Olafur Eliasson: Photographs, The Menil Collection, Houston, May–September 2004
- Kazimir Malevich: Suprematism, co-organized by the Solomon R. Guggenheim Foundation, New York, and Menil Foundation, Inc., Houston (traveled to Deutsche Guggenheim Berlin, January–April 2003; Solomon R. Guggenheim Museum, New York, June–September; The Menil Collection, Houston, October 2003 – January 2004. (2003 AICA Best Monographic Exhibition Organized Nationally)
- Amazons of the Avant-Garde. Six Russian Artists: Alexandra Exter, Natalia Goncharova, Liubov Popova, Olga Rozanova, Varvara Stepanova, and Nadezhda Udaltsova. Traveled (1999–2001)
- Bill Fontana: Acoustical Visions of Venice, 48th Venice Biennale, June–November 1999
- The Art of the Motorcycle, Solomon R. Guggenheim Museum, June–September 1998. Traveled until 2003.
- Guggenheim Virtual Museum, a collaboration with Asymptote Architects, Solomon R. Guggenheim Museum, launched March 2, 1998
- Max Beckmann in Exile, Guggenheim Museum SoHo, New York, NY, October 1996 – January 1997

== Publications ==
Note that the following list doesn't include most exhibition catalogs Drutt has written, though many have been published. He wrote his first exhibition catalog in 1992, for Albert Paley: Sculptural Adornment at the Renwick Gallery, an exhibit by the Smithsonian Institution. It was published by the University of Washington Press in 1992.

- "Pavel Opočensky," in 3/4 of my life. Jewellery by Pavel Opocensky, exhibition catalogue, Hanau: Goldschmiedhaus, August 22 - October 17, 2019
- "Sandy's Jewelry Collection," in The Grotta Home by Richard Meier: A Marriage of Architecture and Craft, Stuttgart: Arnoldsche Art Publishers, 2019
- "Wendy Ramshaw Obituary, The Guardian (January 8, 2019)
- Dichotomies of Form and Color, essay for Annamaria Zanella: The Poetry of Material, Stuttgart: Arnoldsche, 2018
- "The Russian Art of Movement,” (book review), The Art Newspaper (No. 304, September 2018), page 11
- El Lissitzky: The Jewish Period (General Editor; Alexander Kantsedkias, Author), London: Unicorn Press, 2017
- "Sculpture in the Expansive Fields: Storm King Art Center,” Hermitage Magazine (Fall 2016)
- Konstantiniyye: The Trajectory of Anatolian Culture in the Art of Ahmet Güneştikin, 2011 – 2016, Istanbul: GSM, 2016
- Nina Alovert: Motion Captured. Legends of Russian Ballet, exhibition catalogue, National Arts Club, New York, June 13 – 25, 2016
- "Barbara Paganin: The Ambiguity of Memory and Objecthood,” in Barbara Paganin: Memoria Aperta, exhibition catalogue, Philadelphia Art Alliance, May 26 – August 14, 2016
- "Ponamarev’s World,” in Alexander Ponomarev: Stored in Ice, exhibition catalogue, Richard Taittinger Gallery, April 30 – June 12, 2016, pp. 3 – 6
- "Contemporary Israeli Jewelry: A View from Abroad,” in Israeli Jewelry 7, exhibition catalogue, Eretz Israel Museum, Tel Aviv, October 12, 2015 – February 28, 2016
- Felix Gonzalez-Torres: Billboards, Radius Books/Artpace San Antonio: 2015. This is the long-awaited publication for the yearlong, statewide exhibition featuring the work of one of Artpace's most renowned residents held on the occasion of the institution's 15th anniversary in 2010.
- Thannhauser: The Thannhauser Collection of the Guggenheim Museum (New York: Solomon R. Guggenheim Foundation), 2001
