= Helen Drutt =

American gallerist and author (born 1930)

Helen Drutt English
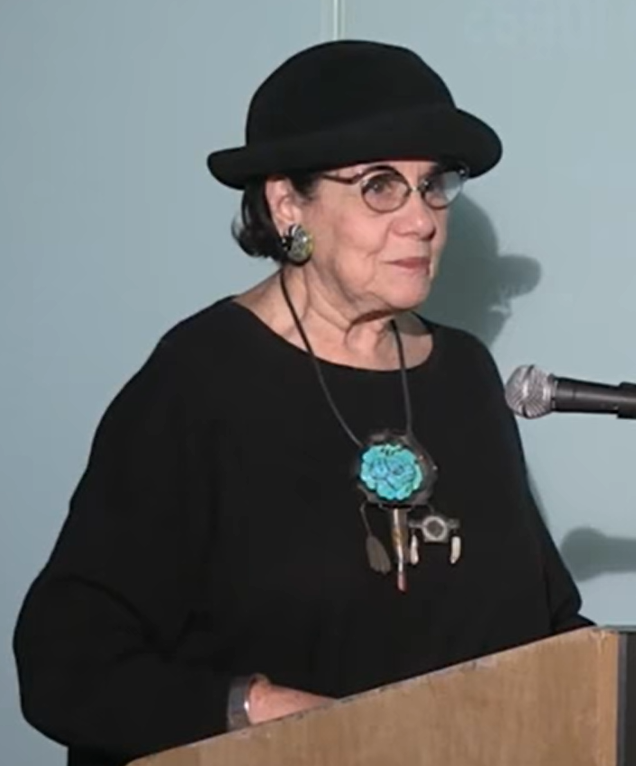
- At a Cooper Hewitt symposium in 2017
- Born: Helen Ann Williams; November 19, 1930 (age 95); Winthrop, Massachusetts, U.S
- Education: Tyler School of Art, Temple University
- Occupations: curator, educator, lecturer, author
- Writing career
- Language: English

Helen Williams Drutt English (born November 19, 1930) is an American gallerist, educator, and author who is best known for her efforts to raise the perception of the so-called craft arts (jewelry, ceramics, wood, fiber) to the same level as fine art through her gallery, teaching, and lectures. As a result of her national and international exhibits, lectures, and catalogs, she has been called the "godmother" and "queen" of crafts. She has received many honors, including a Lifetime Achievement in Crafts award from the National Museum of Women in the Arts (1993) and a Lifetime Achievement award from the Society of North American Goldsmiths (2003).

== Early life, education ==
Helen Williams Drutt was born on November 19, 1930, in Winthrop, Massachusetts, and moved to Philadelphia as a child. She earned a B.F.A. degree from Tyler School of Art at Temple University in 1952 and later studied at the Barnes Foundation.

== Career ==
Drutt was a founding member of the Philadelphia Council of Professional Craftsmen, where she served as executive director and organized exhibits from 1967 to 1973. She founded the Helen Drutt Gallery in 1973 at 1625 Spruce Street, Philadelphia, and held her inaugural exhibit on February 22, 1974. At the same time, Drutt was invited to develop the first college syllabus on the history of 20th-century crafts at Philadelphia College of Art. By 1979, Drutt's gallery was compared in influence and importance to Alfred Stieglitz's 291 Gallery.

In 1982 the Helen Drutt Gallery moved to 305 Cherry Street in the Old City neighborhood of Philadelphia, and in 1984 to 1721 Walnut Street, Philadelphia. In 1988 a Manhattan branch of the gallery opened at 724 Fifth Avenue, New York. In 1995 Drutt was invited by the City of Philadelphia to serve as its first cultural ambassador.

Although the Helen Drutt Gallery closed as a physical space in 2002, Drutt has continued lecturing, writing, and curating. Major exhibits since then include Poetics of Clay: An International Perspective, which exhibited over 125 artists from 14 countries surveying 50 years (1950-2000) of ceramics drawn from private and public collections; A View From America: Contemporary Jewelry ,1974-2003; Brooching It Diplomatically: A Tribute to Madeleine K. Albright; Challenging the Châtelaine!; Gifts from America: 1948–2013, comprising 74 works given to the State Hermitage Museum in Saint Petersburg, Russia, 2014; RINGS! 1968 - 2021; Bracelets, Bangles, & Cuffs: 1948-2024, at the Metal Museum in Memphis, Tennessee, 2024; and Beauty and the Unexpected, comprising works given to the Nationalmuseum, Stockholm, Sweden exhibited from 2023-2025.

The Helen Williams Drutt Collection of Contemporary Studio Jewelry has been exhibited worldwide on several occasions. From 1985 to 1995 it traveled to 11 museums which include the Montreal Museum of Decorative Arts, Canada (1984), Philadelphia Museum of Art (1986-87), the Stedelijk Museum, Amsterdam, The Netherlands (1994-95) and the Museum voor Moderne Kunst, Oostende, Belgium (1995). The support of this exhibition expresses a primary concern and focus on preserving a segment of the history of contemporary jewellery. The expanded Helen Williams Drutt Collection was acquired by the Museum of Fine Arts, Houston, where it was exhibited in 2007 under the title Ornament as Art: Avant-Garde Jewelry from the Helen Williams Drutt Collection with an extensive catalog of the complete collection.

== Personal life ==
Drutt has been married four times: first to Larry Weiss, then to William Drutt (both marriages ended in divorce). Her third marriage was to poet Maurice English from 1982 until his death only one year later in 1983. Drutt founded the Maurice English Poetry Award in his honor. In 2007 she married H. Peter Stern (1928-2018), co-founder of the Storm King Art Center, with whom she remained until his death in 2018. She has a daughter, Ilene Weiss, and a son, Matthew Drutt.

== Awards and honors ==
Most of the honors listed here are sourced from "A Passionate Observer: A Tribute to Helen Drutt", the Clay Studio, 2009

- 1990: honorary doctorate of fine arts, Moore College of Art and Design
- 1991: Tyler Alumni Fellow, Tyler School of Art, Temple University, Philadelphia PA
- 1992: honorary fellow of the American Craft Council
- 1993: Lifetime Achievement in Crafts award, National Museum of Women in the Arts, Washington DC
- 1994: Fleisher Founder’s Award, Samuel S. Fleisher Art Memorial, Philadelphia PA
- 1994: Mayor’s Arts and Culture Award, Philadelphia PA
- 1995-1999: appointed Cultural Ambassador for the City of Philadelphia by the Office of Arts and Culture
- 1999: Visionaries! Award, Museum of Arts and Design, New York NY
- 2001: honorary doctorate of fine arts, University of the Arts, Philadelphia
- 2002: Award of Merit, Philadelphia Art Alliance, Philadelphia PA
- 2003: Lifetime Achievement award, Society of North American Goldsmiths
- 2004: Hall of Fame, Goldsmiths, University of London, London, England
- 2006: Philadelphia Craft Medal, Philadelphia Museum of Art
- 2018: Distinguished Educator's Award, James Renwick Alliance, Smithsonian Institution, Washington, DC
- 2019: honorary doctorate of fine arts, Alfred University, Alfred, NY

== Publications ==
- Among Friends: American and German Jewelry Artists from the Helen Drutt Collection: Galerie Handwerk, Munich, March 5-April 11, 2026. Munich, Germany: Galerie Handwerk. 2026. ISBN 9783897907638.
- Strauss, Cindi; Drutt, Helen Williams (2007). Ornament as art: avant-garde jewelry from the Helen Williams Drutt collection, the Museum of Fine Arts, Houston. Stuttgart, Germany: Arnoldsche Art Publishers in association with the Museum of Fine Arts, Houston. ISBN 9783897902732.
- Drutt, Helen Williams; Dormer, Peter (1995). Jewelry of our time: art, ornament, and obsession. New York: Rizzoli. ISBN 9780847819140.
- Drutt, Helen Williams (2024). Bracelets, bangles, & cuffs, 1948-2024: an exhibition conceived by Helen Drutt. Memphis, TN: National Ornamental Metal Museum. ISBN 9798218419783.
- Helen Drutt Gallery (1998). Brooching It Diplomatically: A Tribute to Madeleine Albright. Stuttgart, Germany: Arnoldsche Art Publishers. ISBN 9783897901520.

== Lectures and interviews ==
- "Craft in America: Home: Helen Drutt English". PBS: Craft in America.
- "Oral history interview with Helen Williams Drutt (English), 1991 July 5-October 20". Archives of American Art.
- "Peter Dormer Lecture, October 7, 2024: Helen Drutt: 'A Passionate Observer, Five Decades'". Royal College of Art, London. November 26, 2024.
