= Anton Ginzburg =

New York based artist and educator

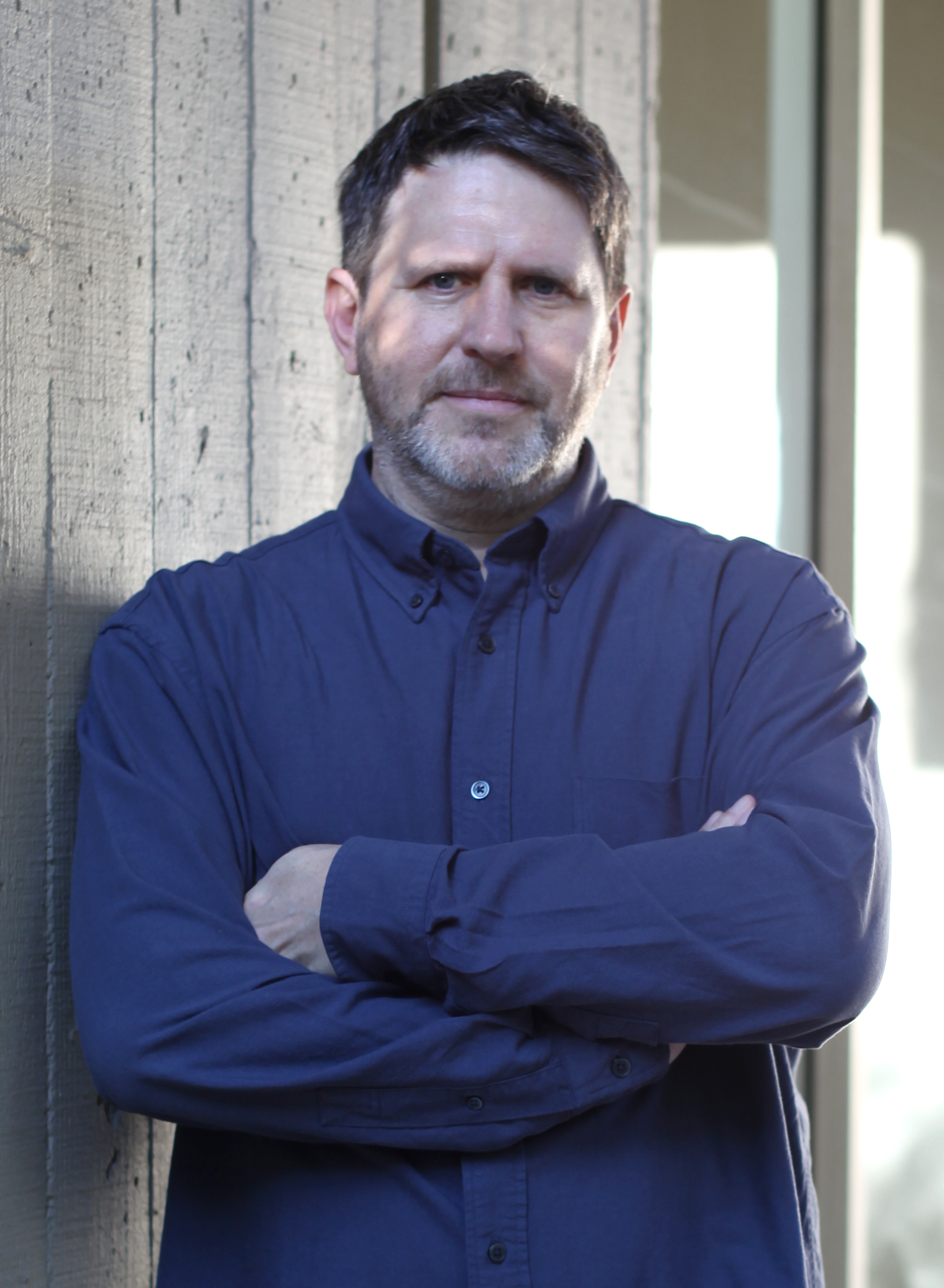
- Born: February 18, 1974 (age 52); St. Petersburg (Leningrad), USSR
- Citizenship: (United States) USA
- Education: Parsons School of Design, Bard College, Middlesex University
- Known for: Artist, film director, educator
- Website: http://www.antonginzburg.com/

Anton Ginzburg (born 1974) is a New York-based artist, researcher and educator working across painting, sculpture, film, design and installation. His practice explores historical narratives, place, and modernist form through multi-media projects and architectural collaborations. His work has been exhibited at the Venice Biennale and museums throughout Europe and the United States.

== Biography ==
Anton Ginzburg was born in 1974 in Leningrad (now Saint Petersburg), Soviet Union. In 1990, Ginzburg emigrated to the United States. He earned a Bachelor of Fine Arts degree from Parsons School of Design in New York City, a Master of Fine Arts degree from Bard College, and a PhD from Middlesex University London.

Ginzburg's work has been presented at the 54th and 59th Venice Biennales, the San Francisco Museum of Modern Art, and the Palais de Tokyo in Paris, among other institutions internationally.

He teaches at Pratt Institute and Parsons School of Design in New York City and has served as a visiting artist and lecturer at universities in the United States and Europe.

== Terra Corpus Trilogy (2011–2020) ==
Throughout his practice, Ginzburg investigates historical narratives and poetic studies of place, representation and modernist form. Between 2011 and 2020, Ginzburg developed and exhibited a trilogy of major works under the collective title Terra Corpus. Each project in the series—At the Back of the North Wind, Walking the Sea, and Blue Flame: Constructions and Initiatives—examines altered landscapes shaped by Soviet histories and modernist ideologies.

“At the Back of the North Wind (2011) was presented as an official Collateral Event of the 54th Venice Biennale, supported by Artpace and the Blaffer Art Museum. The project explores the myth of Hyperborea by combining factual research with fictional narrative and comprises sculptures, paintings, and a film.

Walking the Sea (2013) focuses on the ecological catastrophe of the Aral Sea in Central Asia. The project reflects on Soviet infrastructural failure and environmental degradation through lyrical fieldwork, sculptural installation and film. Its centerpiece is a film that documents a solitary figure traversing the former seabed, carrying a mirrored structure that reframes the desert landscape and historical memory.

Blue Flame: Constructions and Initiatives (2020) explores Soviet Constructivist education and architecture by reactivating historical pedagogies from VKhUTEMAS. The project includes the film Turo and installations that draw on archival materials, experimental forms, and speculative re-staging of Constructivist spatial theories. The film Turo premiered at the concert "ReMix: Orchestral Myth and Legend," (2016) with chapters set to Wagner's Waldweben (1876) and Sibelius's Pohjola's Daughter (1906), inspired by the Finnish epic poem Kalevala. Conducted by Karina Canellakis, the Dallas Symphony Orchestra performed live accompaniment as the musical pieces were presented in dialogue with imagery of ruined iconic Constructivist buildings.

== Public sculpture ==
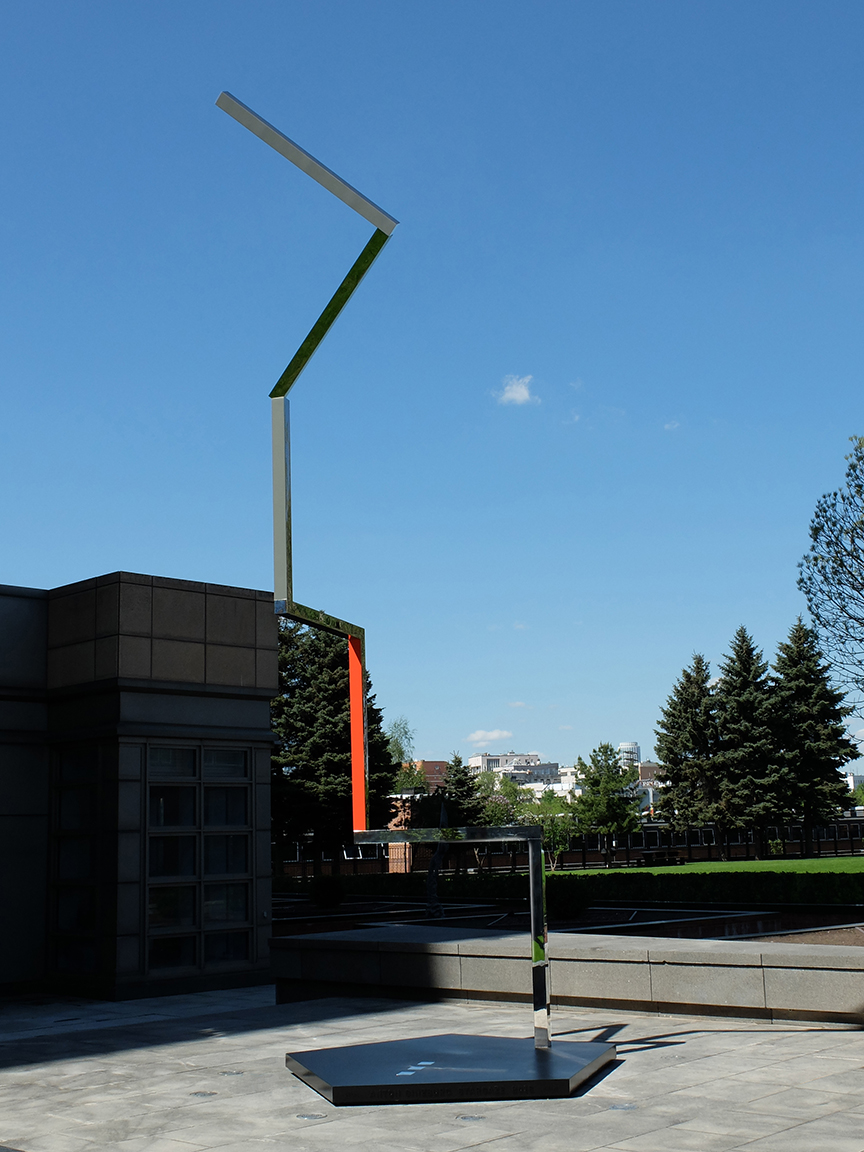
Anton Ginzburg. Stargaze: Orion

Public art is an area of research and practice for Ginzburg. He has received multiple commissions for both permanent and temporary works, including a site-specific installation for Kunst-Station, Wolfsburg, Germany, where he addressed Daniel Buren's permanent installation at the station, a public commission for Lille3000, Europe XXL in Lille, France, and commissions from the University of Massachusetts Amherst / Department of Architecture, among others.

Stargaze: Orion is a public sculpture commissioned in 2014 by Art in Embassies, U.S. Department of State. The sculpture was completed in 2016 and installed at the U.S. Embassy in Moscow in 2018.

Stargaze: Orion is a mirror-polished steel modular construction that functions as an instrument or a 'situation', extending the viewer's gaze and framing the constellation of Orion. The linear nature of the sculpture creates a shift and superimposition within the city's grid. The base features a black bronze pentagon representing a stellar map of the Orion constellation. The sculpture explores the human bond with the cosmos through the act of gazing into the sky, with colored planes that frame prescribed views directing the gaze, while its mirror-polished surfaces reflect the sculpture's surroundings and the viewer.

== Research and technological experimentation ==
In 2021, Ginzburg completed a six-month research fellowship at the Schaufler Lab at the Technical University of Dresden, investigating concepts of creativity and algorithmic approaches with a focus on Artificial Intelligence, Technology, and Creative Labor. The work was later presented in a museum installation at the Schauwerk Sindelfingen museum in Germany, featuring large-format murals and sculptures. Ginzburg applied sentiment analysis and mathematical algorithms to create 3D sculptural forms inspired by the film scripts of American Psycho and Trainspotting produced using large-scale 3D printing technology.

== Constructed Geographies ==
In 2024, Ginzburg received a PhD in Public Works from Middlesex University London. His thesis, Constructed Geographies in Contemporary Art (2023), developed the framework of "constructed geographies" — a method holding that geography is authored rather than found, with places and cultural forms inscribed with meaning through architectural, ornamental, material, and historical processes that can be read as visual language systems. Drawing on cultural geography, semiotics, material culture, and modernist traditions, it traces how forms undergo semantic, material, and historical transformation across time and context. As a Visiting Fellow at the Bard Graduate Center, Ginzburg has extended the framework to the ornamental architecture of Lower Manhattan's financial district.

== Monographs ==
- Anton Ginzburg: At the Back of the North Wind. Published by Hatje Cantz (2012). Texts by Matthew Drutt, Anton Ginzburg, Jeffrey Kastner, interview with the artist by Boris Groys. Graphic design by Project Projects, New York. ISBN 978-3-7757-3429-5
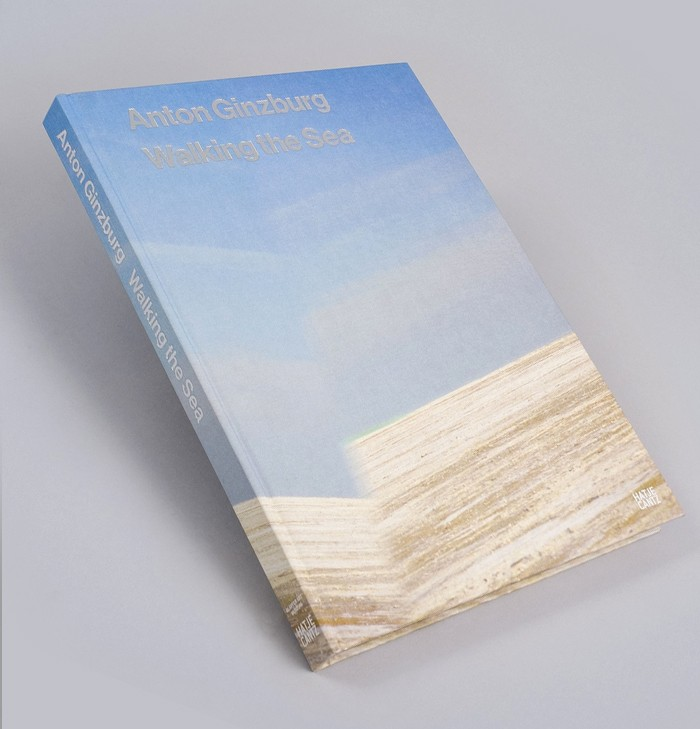
  Anton Ginzburg. Walking The Sea
- Anton Ginzburg: Walking the Sea. Published by Hatje Cantz (2014). Texts by Claudia Schmuckli, Melanie Marino, Olesya Turkina, interview with the artist by Dan Graham. Graphic design by Project Projects, NY. ISBN 978-3-7757-3831-6
- Anton Ginzburg: Blue Flame Constructions and Initiatives. Published by Hatje Cantz (2020). Text(s) by Anton Ginzburg, Anastasia Osipova, Ksenia Nouril, contributions by R.H. Quaytman, Charles Renfro, Meghan Forbes. Graphic design by Anton Ginzburg. ISBN 978-3-7757-4676-2
- Anton Ginzburg: Dresden Modular. Published by Sandstein Verlag (2024). Essays by Lev Manovich, Gwendolyn Kremer, Rebekka Roschy, Axel Voigt and Anton Ginzburg. Graphic design by Simone Antonia Deutsch. ISBN 978-3-95498-684-2

== Group catalogs and edited volumes ==
- Punk Orientalism: The Art of Rebellion, 2022. Publisher: Black Dog Pub Ltd, UK. Sara Raza (Writer and Editor)
- Stagings. Soundings. Readings. Free Jazz II, 2018. Publisher: NTU Center for Contemporary Art, Singapore. Ute Meta Bauer (Editor)
- Specters of Communism: Contemporary Russian Art, 2015. Essay by Boris Groys. Publisher: e-flux and CUNY Graduate Center
- IllumiNations, catalog of 54th Venice Biennale, 2011. Bice Curiger (Editor)
- Lesson of History, catalog of the exhibition at Palais de Tokyo, 2010
- Invisible Borders catalog of Lille3000 exhibition, 2009. Caroline David (Editor)
- Inside Design Now: The National Design Triennial, 2003. Cooper Hewitt National Design Museum. Publisher Princeton Architectural Press
