= The Fisher-Girl and the Crab =

Indian fairy tale

The Fisher-Girl and the Crab is an Indian fairy tale collected by Verrier Elwin in Folk-Tales of Mahakoshal. The story comes from the Kurukh people, a ethnolinguistic group living in Chitrakoot, in the then princely state of Bastar State.

== Synopsis ==
A childless Kurukh couple found a gourd by their rice field and prepared to eat it, but the gourd begged them to gently cut it open. Inside the gourd was a talking crab, whom the couple decided to adopt. The woman tied a basket to her belly, pretended to be pregnant, and then claimed to have given birth to the crab.

In time, the couple married their son to a human woman. However, the son's new wife did not like being married to a crab. She snuck off while her in-laws were asleep, but the crab was already ahead of her. He asked a banyan tree who it belonged to. The tree answered that it belonged to the crab, and he ordered it to bend down, which it did. He then traded his crab shape for a human shape from within the tree. The crab's wife unknowingly met him at a dance and gifted him her ornaments. He rushed home before her, returning to his crab shape again and gave his wife her ornaments back, but this only frightened her more.

The wife pretended to sneak out again but this time, stayed hidden nearby to watch the crab. After the crab had put on his human shape and departed, his wife approached and asked the banyan tree who it belonged to. When the tree said it was hers, she ordered it to fall down and burn the crab shape, destroying it. When her husband could not find her at the dance, he came back to the tree, where she jumped out, caught him, and took him home.

== Analysis ==
=== Tale type ===
Folklorists Stith Thompson and Warren Roberts established an index for South Asian folktales based on the international Aarne-Thompson Index. In their joint work, titled Types of Indic Oral Tales, they classified the tale as type 441, "Hans My Hedgehog," a miscellaneous type that, while still belonging to the cycle of the Animal as Bridegroom and dealing with the marriage between a human maiden and an enchanted animal, lacks the quest for the vanished or missing husband element.

=== Motifs ===
Elwin noted that the crab is considered monogamous and is an example of domestic fidelity.

According to Stith Thompson and Jonas Balys study of motifs of Indian literature and oral folklore, the tale contains the motifs B647.1.1., "Marriage to person in crab form" and D375., "Transformation: crab to man".

== Variants ==
Professor Stuart Blackburn located variants of the crab husband story among tribal groups from India (namely, the Gondi, the Kuruk, and Santal), as well as from Burma (Shan), and northern Laos (Mien).

=== From the Muria ===
Elwin collected a tale from the Muria people from Markabera with the title The Crab-Prince. In this tale, a Muria couple live alone and plant rice near the bank of a river. A crab called Kakramal Kuar emerges from the river to eat their rice. The woman asks her husband to prepare a Jitka trap for the crab. The Muria man catches the crab and is poised to kill it with an axe, when the crab asks the man to take it home, to which he agrees. Eight days later, the local Rajá summons all the young people, men and women, to harvest the fields. The crab decides to join them despite the Muria woman's objections. However, the crab is expelled by other workers and finds another spot in the Raja's daughter's fields, where he takes off the shell and becomes a "beautiful twelve-year-old boy." Meanwhile, Raja's daughter brings some gruel to feed the harvesters and learns about the crab working on her fields. She goes there and sees the boy, who quickly hides back in his crustacean shell. The princess places his food between his claws and rejoins the others. Later that same day, the crab joins the remaining workers for a meal of pork and liquor. Sometime later, the princess sulks and asks her father for her to be married as soon as possible. The Rajá summons princes from all over as suitors, but the princess chooses none of them. When the crab arrives, the princess places a garland on him and marries him. One night, the crab boy takes off his shell and goes to the stables to jump on his father-in-law's horses and ride them to exhaustion. The horses' condition begins to arouse suspicion, and the Rajá decides to investigate. He spies on his son-in-law coming out of his shell and riding the horses. The Raja then tells his daughter to burn the crab shell the next time he takes it off. The princess does it and the boy remains human for good, although at first, he does not want to be seen without his shell. Russian translator Georgy A. Zograf translated the tale to Russian with the title "Краб-царевич" ("Crab-Prince") and classified the tale as Thompson-Roberts' type 441.

=== From the Warli ===
In a story collected from a Warli painting by Warli artists Jivya Soma Mashe and Balu Dumara's painting and titled Seven Sisters and Crab, a man with seven daughters goes to gather leaves in the forest. After heaping some, he calls out for help, then repeats the request with a promise to marry his helper to one of his daughters. Suddenly, a crab appears and helps the man carry the bundle of leaves to his house. The man comes home and tell his daughters about his promise: the seven daughters scoff at the idea, when the crab insists on getting his due reward. Thus, the youngest agrees to marry him. The crab takes the girl to his hole, but in the hole there is a large mansion, and he reveals his human shape. The girl is delighted at the fact, and returns home the following day to show her husband to her sisters. The elder sisters do not believe their cadette at first, when the man turns back to crab shape, then returns to human form to prove his wife's claims.

In a Warli narrative painting titled Divinity and the Crabshell, a man named Ramji has seven daughters which he pampers, hoping to have them care for him and his wife in their old age. One day, he goes to the forest to find leaves to thatch their roof, since the rain season is approaching and Ramji had to give the paddy straw to pay off their debt. Ramji and his daughters venture deep into the forest for larger leaves, since other women have fetched most of the leaves from the front part of the forest. Luckily, the family find large leaves to make enough bundles with them and the girls take their bundles home. Ramji makes a bundle so large he cannot lift it, so he tries find someone in the forest: men who are cutting firewood, and boys and girls collecting berries, sprouts and leaves of the bondara tree. As it gets dark, Ramji calls out for help and offers to marry one of his seven daughters to whoever can help him take the leaf bundle home. He hears a rustling on the ground approaching him and finds a large crab. The crab offers to help him and lifts the bundle over Ramji's head, so he could return home with it. After he returns home, his youngest daughter helps the man place the bundle on the ground and they ask how he managed to bring the heavy bundle. The crab appears next to his foot and the elder daughter screams at the sight, then Ramji explains the situation to them. Ramji's wife supports her husband's decision, but the girls ponder about either marrying a crab or having one as brother-in-law, so they convene up a mal (grazing hillock) to discuss the matter. After midnight, the cadette, named Sundari, agrees to marry the crab. Sundari accompanies the crab to a hut in the forest, and finds it furnished with provisions (rice, lentil), pots, pans and a private spring for bathing and washing clothes. The crab treats Sundari with kindness and with want of nothing. One day, he announces he has to tend to some tasks and has to leave for a while. Sundari works all day and goes to sleep with the crab when he returns at night. They fall into a routine. One night, Sundari notices a presence beside her in bed, which is not the crab, since a crabshell is hanging from a pillar, and a person moving about in the house. The girl goes to sleep and thinks it to be a dream. However, the situation occurs again with some regularity. The tale explains that the crab husband is summoned to the assembly of the gods and leaves his crabshell on Earth, then goes back to it to remain on Earth and live among the humans. One night, Sundari decides to discover the truth and lies in waiting for her husband to come. He sneaks in before dawn and goes to lie on their bed, when Sundari reaches for his hand and holds it in her grip, which he does not fight against. The girl asks her husband, and he reveals everything: he is a god who has come to live under the crabshell in crab form to better assess the needs and issues of mankind; that the crabshell was also the "vehicle" of his divinity, which means that destroying it will turn the god into human; and that he wanted to have human companionship. Sundari is satisfied with his answers, but he ponders about wanting whether or not to destroy the crabshell. Some time later, when he returns one night and hangs the crabshell on the pillar, Sundari steals it and burns it in a small fire. The god, now human, asks her the reason for this, and she answers that he also needs to tend to the wellbeing of his human partner and wife. They spend time together in each other's arms, and pay a visit to her family that same evening. As the couple approach the house, Ramji's elder daughters spot the handsome man next to Sundari and deduce he is the crab, and chastise themselves for forcing their cadette to marry the crab.

=== From the Gamit ===
In a tale from the Gamit people with the title Kooalo ne Teen Ba-A-Hinyo ("Crab and Three Sisters"), an old man has three daughters. One day, he goes to gather firewood in the forest, but cannot lift up the bundle, so he asks for help. A crab appears and offers its help to the human, but in exchange for marrying one of the man's daughters. The man returns home and explains the situation to his daughters: the elder two mock the crab and refuse to marry him, save for the youngest. The cadette marries the crab husband and lives in its house. One day, her father pays her a visit, but the crab son-in-law is not at home. The girl asks her husband which food she needs to prepare for her father, and the crab's voice answers that it shall be a chicken and mutton. Later, the elder sisters visit their cadette at an occasion when the husband is not at home. The girl asks her husband which food she should prepare them, and the crab answers that it shall be some chicken with feathers. For this rude hospitality, the girls no longer visit their sister.

=== Other regions ===
Author Shovona Devi published a Bengali tale titled The Crab Prince. In this tale, a poor widow earns her living by begging for alms. One day, she reaches an empty hut in the forest where a vermilion-coloured crab lives. The crab treats the widow as his mother and promises to bring her food. The next day, the crab goes to the store and crams food in his ear to bring to the widow. The second day, he brings her money, so she can build a better house. The third day, the widow cries that if only the crab was human, he could bring her a daughter-in-law as his bride. The crab promises to marry none other than the prince's daughter and decides to go to the castle. On the journey, he is joined by a cat, a tiger, bamboo, and a river, which each enter the crab's ear so he can carry them. The crab goes to the prince's palace and demands to be married to his daughter. The prince is affronted and tries to kill the crab many times, but each time, his friends (the cat, the tiger, the bamboo, and the river) save him. The prince surrenders and allows his daughter to marry the crab. Sometime later, the prince visits his daughter in the widow's new house and learns that his son-in-law is only a crab during the day and becomes human at night. The prince advises his daughter to get rid of the crab's shell. The next time the crab goes to sleep in his human form, the princess pounds his shell to dust and he remains human permanently.

== See also ==
- Animal as Bridegroom
- The Donkey
- The Goat Girl
- The Golden Crab
- Prince Crawfish
- The Pig King
- Muchie-Lal
