= The Donkey (fairy tale) =

German fairy tale

Folk tale
- Name: The Donkey
- Also known as: The Ass; The Little Donkey
- Aarne–Thompson grouping: 430
- Country: Germany
- Published in: Grimms' Fairy Tales

"The Ass", "The Donkey", or "The Little Donkey" (German: Das Eselein) is a German fairy tale collected by Brothers Grimm compiled in the Grimm's Fairy Tales.

== Tale type ==
"The Ass", "The Donkey" or "The Little Donkey" (Das Eselein) is cataloged as KHM 144 (since the second edition of the Grimms' Fairy Tales), in the compilation of the Brothers Grimm.

This tale was not collected from oral recitation but was reworked by Wilhelm Grimm from the fourteenth-century Latin tale Asinarius.

The piece is representative of the Aarne-Thompson tale type 430 "The Ass" (or "The Donkey Bridegroom"), and exhibits the motif D721.3 "Disenchantment by destroying skin (covering)".

== Synopsis ==
A king and queen had everything they wished for but no children. Eventually, the queen gave birth, but to a young donkey. They were disappointed but the king decided to raise the donkey as his son and heir. The donkey requested to learn to play the lute and became an accomplished player. Seeing the reflection of himself in the mirror one day, he became sad and decided to travel outside of the kingdom.

He eventually arrived to a kingdom that was ruled by an old king who had a beautiful daughter. When he knocked on the gate the gatekeeper did not give him admittance, but when he played his lute, the gatekeeper ran to the king and told him. Initially mocked by the king's attendance, the donkey insists on being treated as a nobleman and the king lets the donkey sit beside his daughter and he behaves like a gentleman.

After many days, the donkey grew sad and the king offered him many things to make him happy, as the king liked him a great deal. The donkey would only accept the king's beautiful daughter as his wife, and they married. After the wedding, the king sent a servant to watch their bedroom to see that the donkey behaved himself. The servant observed the donkey take off his skin and underneath he was a handsome young man. He related this to the king, who observed for himself later and threw the donkey skin away in the night. When the young man awoke, he panicked and decided to run away. On his way out, the king found him and told him to stay and offered to make him his heir. The young man accepted, and when the old king died the next year, he became king and had a glorious life.

== See also ==
- Donkey (Shrek)
- Hans My Hedgehog
- The Donkey's Head (Jewish-Tunisian folktale)
- The Fisher-Girl and the Crab
- The Goat Girl
- The Padisah's Youngest Daughter and Her Donkey-Skull Husband
- The Pig King
- The Pretty Little Calf
