= How Some Children Played at Slaughtering =

Set of two stories from Grimm's Fairy Tales

"How Some Children Played at Slaughtering" (German: Wie Kinder Schlachtens miteinander gespielt haben, also translated as "How children played slaughtering together") is a set of two anecdotes from Grimm's Fairy Tales. It was removed from the book in the second edition, and is missing from most modern editions as well.

== Synopsis ==
Part One
In a city named Franecker, located in West Friesland, a group of young children (around 5 or 6 years of age) play at being a butcher, a cook, a cook's assistant, etc., and kill a child who pretends to be a pig. The child who played as "the butcher" is arrested and charged for murder, but the town council is unsure if such a young child should be punished. An old, wise councilor finally comes up with a special method to decide if the child is guilty or not. He brings a ripe apple and an expensive gold coin, held one in each hand, and let the child choose between them. If the "butcher" chose the apple (proving that the child still had a completely naive mind), then he would be innocent, and would be free to go; if he chose the gold coin (proving that a more abstract understanding of values had already developed in the child), the child would be guilty and hanged for murder. "The butcher" chooses the apple without any hesitation. Therefore, he is released and all charges are dropped.

Part Two
One day, two brothers see their father killing a pig. While imitating the slaughter, the older brother kills his younger brother. Their mother, who is busy giving the baby a bath, hears her child scream and abandons the baby. When she sees what her eldest child did, she takes the knife out of her younger son's throat, and in her rage stabs her older son in the heart. She then discovers the baby had drowned in the tub. Feeling inconsolable desperation, she commits suicide by hanging herself. After a long day of work in the field, the father comes home. He discovers that his whole family is dead, and soon also dies from sadness.

== See also ==
- Mens rea
