= Hans My Hedgehog =

German fairy tale

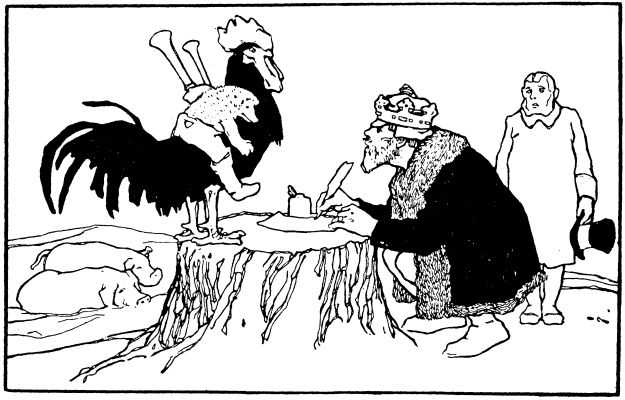
- Hans My Hedgehog meets the king on its chicken mount. Illustration by Otto Ubbelohde.

Folk tale
- Name: Hans My Hedgehog
- Aarne–Thompson grouping: ATU 441
- Country: Germany
- Published in: Grimm's Fairy Tales
- Related: Hedgehog Son

"Hans My Hedgehog" (German: Hans mein Igel) is a German fairy tale collected by the Brothers Grimm (KHM 108). The tale was translated as Jack My Hedgehog by Andrew Lang and published in The Green Fairy Book. It is of Aarne-Thompson type 441. (Note: Stith Thompson (1928), 2nd Revision (1964); Uther (2004).)

The tale follows the events in the life of a diminutive half-hedgehog, half-human being named Hans, who eventually sheds his animal skin and turns wholly human after winning a princess.

== Origin ==
The tale was first published by the Brothers Grimm in Kinder- und Hausmärchen, vol. 2, (1815) as tale no. 22. From the second edition onward, it was given the no. 108. Their source was the German storyteller Dorothea Viehmann (1755–1815).

== Synopsis ==
A wealthy but childless farmer wishes he had a child, even a hedgehog. He comes home to find that his wife has given birth to a baby boy that is a hedgehog from the waist up. They then name him "Hans My Hedgehog". After eight years, Hans leaves his family riding a shod cockerel (Hahn, 'cock, rooster'; Göckelhahn, 'a (mature) cock') to seek his fortune. He goes off into the woods and sits in a tree and plays his bagpipe and watches the pigs and donkeys mate for a year.

A few years later, a lost king stumbles upon Hans after hearing him play beautifully on the bagpipes. Hans makes a deal with the king: he will show him the way home if the king promises to sign over whatever first comes to meet him upon his return. However, the king thinks Hans is illiterate, and decides to trick him by writing an order that Hans should receive nothing. When they arrive at the kingdom, the king's daughter runs to greet him. The king tells her about the deal Hans has tried to make and how he has tricked him. Unconcerned by the betrayal, Hans continues to tend to his animals in the forest. A second lost king stumbles upon Hans and agrees to his deal. Upon his return, the second king's only daughter rushes out to greet him, and in doing so becomes the property of Hans. For the sake of her father, the princess happily agrees to Hans' deal.

In time, Hans My Hedgehog goes to claim his promises. The first king attempts to withhold his daughter, but Hans forces him to give her up. Hans then makes her take off her clothes, pierces her with his prickles until she is bloody all over, and sends her back to the kingdom in disgrace. The second king agrees to the marriage; the princess holds herself bound by her promise and Hans My Hedgehog marries her. On their wedding night, he tells the king to build a fire and to post guards at his door. Hans removes his hedgehog skin and instructs the guards to throw the skin in the fire and watch it until it is completely consumed. Hans appears black, as if he has been burned. After physicians clean him, he is shown to be a handsome young gentleman. After several years, Hans returns home to collect his father and they live together in the kingdom.

== Characters ==
=== Characters list ===
- Hans – Main character, with a tiny human's lower body but quilled head and torso of a hedgehog.
- Farmer (Hans' father) – Wishes for a son "even if it's a hedgehog"
- Farmer's wife (Hans' mother)
- First King – Betrays Hans and breaks his promise reward him with his daughter's hand in marriage.
- Second King – Fulfills his promise and becomes Hans's father in-law.
- First Princess – Refuses to marry Hans and is punished by being pricked by Hans' quills until she bleeds.
- Second Princess – Honors her father's wishes and agrees to marry Hans.

== Analysis ==
=== Tale type ===
The tale is similar to other ATU 441 tales such as Straparola's literary fairy tale Il re Porco ("King Pig") and Madame d'Aulnoy's Prince Marcassin. (Note: French: marcassin, lit. 'young wild boar'.)

=== Motifs ===
==== The animal husband ====
Polish philologist Mark Lidzbarski noted that the pig prince usually appears in Romance language tales, while the hedgehog as the animal husband occurs in Germanic and Slavic tales. Also, according to Swedish folklorist Waldemar Liungman and Christine Shojaei Kawan (in Enzyklopädie des Märchens), in type ATU 441 the animal husband may be a hedgehog, a wild boar or a porcupine. The Grimms' notes state that in these fairy tales, "Hedgehog, porcupine, and pig are here synonymous, like Porc and Porcaril".

==== The animal skin ====
"Grimm's tale, "Hans, My Hedgehog," exhibits motif D721.3 "Disenchantment by destroying skin (covering)".

This motif is found in other Grimm's fairy tales and myths as a symbol of psychological metamorphosis. Hans was born half-hedgehog and he cannot break the spell until he is able to burn his prickly hedgehog skin.

This same motif of the burning of false or alternative skins in the attempt to create a single whole can also be found in the Grimm's tale of "The Donkey" (Das Eselein). In these cases, the groom upon marriage "literally undress from the donkey skin or quills.. casting their skins aside like old garments", according to researcher Carole Scott, who thus counts the animal skin as a sort of "magical dress". By shedding the skin/dress, Hans has assumed a new identity.

=== Interpretations ===
==== Deformed dwarf ====
The Hans the Hedgehog character is a half-hedgehog, of clearly tiny stature. In the tale he rides a cock like a horse, and the two together are mistaken for some "little animal". Hans is treated as a "monster" in his folktale world, and thus distinguished from Thumbling or Tom Thumb who are merely diminutive humans. Unlike the other Grimms' tale characters who are portrayed as a fully animal form, Hans is the only half-animal half-human hybrid, thus increasing his overall outlandishness.

Researcher Ann Schmiesing engages in a disability studies analysis of the tale and its protagonist. According to her, the Grimms implicitly suggest Hans's outward appearance as symbolic of "a disease or impairment that stunted physical or cognitive growth", and thus Hans's condition is to be associated with disability as well as deformity. Hans therefore qualifies as being classed as the "cripple", or rather the "super cripple (supercrip)" hero figure. The fairy tale "cripple" is stereotypically ostracized and shunned by society, but even after he turns "supercripple", i.e., demonstrates "extraordinary abilities" and "overachievement", this does not vindicate him in the eyes of other folk in the story, but rather only exacerbates his "enfreakment", according to Schmiesing. To the readership, however, the able underdog is a figure that "defies pity".

In this analysis, his level of "freakiness" is also heightened after he requests bagpipes from his father who is going to the market, as does the rooster that he rides.

== Variants ==
According to Swedish folklorist Waldemar Liungman and narrative researcher Ines Köhler-Zülch, tale type ATU 441 is reported in Germany, Baltic Countries, Hungary and among West Slavic (Note: Czech: Tille 1929ff.; Slovak: Gašparíková 1991f. I, No. 298; Polish: Krzyżanowski 1962f. I) and South Slavic (Note: Croatian: Leskien 1915, No. 33; Slovene: Byhan 1958, 94ff., Bolhar 1974, 101ff.) peoples (although Liungman mentioned the existence of variants in Sweden, Greece, and Italy). Estonian scholars, in the 2009 edition of the Estonian Folktale Catalogue, state that tale type ATU 441 is not very known internationally, being found in the Baltic Countries, Central and Eastern Europe, and in some parts of Asia.

The Scottish version "The Hedgehurst" recited by Traveller storyteller Duncan Williamson has also been published in book collection.

=== German ===
Another version is "Der Lustige Zaunigel" ("The Merry Hedgehog"; actually "Porcupine" (Note: The tale itself states that Zaunigel is Stachelschwein or "porcupine".)) collected by Heinrich Pröhle and published in 1854. (Note: Grimm says Pröhle's Märchen für Kinder, No. 13, but the correct title is Märchen für die jugend. The tale is not included in Pröhle's Haus- und Volksmärchen (1853).)

=== Romance ===
In a Rhaeto-Romance tale titled Il tgiau piertg, translated to German as Der Schweinskopf ("The [One With a] Pig-Head"), published by Caspar Decurtins and collected in Surselva, a man and a woman live together and suffer for not having children. One day, she gives birth to a son with a pig's head. When he is older, they send him to the forest to graze the pigs. At one time, a nobleman loses his way in the forest, and approaches the pig-headed shepherd in search of help. The pig-headed son offers his help, but in exchange for one of the nobleman's three daughters. The noble lord promises to bring one of his daughters in three days' time and is helped out of the forest by the pig-headed son. The lord returns home and forgets his promise, but three days later, the pig-headed son appears at his castle riding a rooster. The lord realizes the creature is there to get one of his daughters as bride, and explains the situation to his daughters. The elder two refuse to marry the pig-headed stranger, save for the youngest, who accepts the deal out of love for her father. The cadette princess joins the pig-headed son in church. The priest, thinking that the bridegroom was not baptized, sprinkles holy water on him. This causes the pig's head to fall off to reveal the most handsome prince alive. The elder princesses feel such envy of their cadette, they hang themselves.

=== Slavic ===
In a South Slavic tale published by Slavicist Friedrich Salomon Krauss with the title Prinz Igel ("Prince Hedgehog"), a childless empress and emperor wish for a child even if he is the size of a hedgehog, so God grants them their wish. Seven years later, the little animal marries a human girl, who is advised to sprinkle the hedgehog with holy water, prickle her fingers on three of his quills and let her blood fall on his body. Following this advice, the girl disenchants the hedgehog into a normal youth. The tale was translated as Prince Hedgehog and published in The Russian grandmother's wonder tales.

In a Croatian tale collected by Croatian linguist Rudolf Strohal with the title O ježu mladoženji ("About the Hedgehog Bridegroom"), a couple does not have a son, until one day the wife prays to God to be given a son, even if he is a hedgehog. Thus God grants her prayer and a little hedgehog is born to them. Scared, the woman releases a piglet after the hedgehog to shoo it away, but the hedgehog takes the piglet in the forest and raises a herd of them for nine years. Time passes, and a man loses his way amongst the pig herd, and the hedgehog helps him through it, gaining a hundred forints as a reward. The hedgehog returns home to his parents, gives them the reward and lets the herd stay with them, then asks his mother to find him a bride. Despite his mother's reservations, she finds him a maiden who is willing to marry him. They marry; at night, he takes off the hedgehog skin, revealing a handsome youth, and hides it under the bed. The next day, the maiden tells her mother about the hedgehog husband's skin, and she suggests the girl takes it and burns it in an oven. The maiden follows her advice. The next morning, the now human hedgehog wakes up and cannot find the skin, then asks his wife what she has done with it. The girl answers she burnt it, and the youth tells her that, if she had waited a little more, happiness would have been his. The tale ends. Linguist August Leskien translated the tale as Der Igelbräutigam ("The Hedgehog Bridegroom"), and, in his notes to the tale, supposed that the story could have led into another sequence, but the second part was apparently missing.

==== Poland ====
Philologist and folklorist Julian Krzyżanowski, establisher of the Polish Folktale Catalogue according to the international index, classified tales about the hedgehog husband as Polish type T 441, Królewicz-jeż ("Prince-Hedgehog").

In a Polish tale translated as The Enchanted Hedgehog, a poor peasant woman sees a hedgehog in the forest and wishes to have a son, just like a hedgehog, so one is born to her and her husband. The little hedgehog son helps the couple in the house chores, and one day decides to herd the pigs. He brings the pigs to the forest and herds them for six years. One day, he meets a king who lost his way in the woods, and promises to help him, in exchange for one of the princesses as his wife. The king agrees and signs a deal with the hedgehog, then goes home. Later, the hedgehog rides a rooster to the king's castle and demands the king delivers him one of his daughters. The king decides to renege on his part of the deal, and sends for his army to shoot the little animal. The hedgehog, however, summons his own army of hedgehogs with a whistle to circle the castle. Afraid, the king orders his youngest daughter to marry the hedgehog. They wed in a grand ceremony, and they retire to their bedchambers. Reluctantly, the princess allows for the hedgehog to sleep beside her, and, in the morning, she finds a handsome prince in its place. The human prince explains he was enchanted to that form.

==== Czech Republic ====
Czech writer Josef Košín z Radostova collected a Czech tale (sourced from Bohemia) with the title Ježek ženichem ("The Hedgehog as Bridegroom"), which Alfred Waldau translated as Der Igel as Bräutigam ("The Hedgehog as Bridegroom"). In this tale, a peasant lives with his wife and does not have a child, until one night she expresses her wish for a hedgehog for a son. Her husband warns her about her words, to no avail: the next morning, a little hedgehog appears from behind the stove and becomes their son, despite the man's complaints. Some time later, the hedgehog asks his father for a whip and a shepherd's staff so he can graze the sheep. One day, a prince becomes lost in the woods, and the hedgehog offers to guide him out of the woods, if the prince agrees to give one of his daughters as bride for the animal. To seal the deal, they sign a written document. Later, the hedgehog saddles a rooster and goes to the prince's castle to fulfill the latter's part of the deal. The prince asks which of his daughters shall marry the hedgehog: the elder two refuse, but the youngest agrees to be his bride. They marry. On the wedding night, the prince's daughter cries, and the hedgehog asks the girl to take a knife and cut open his body. The girl obeys and cuts open the hedgehog's body, revealing a handsome youth underneath. The next morning, the human hedgehog takes his wife for breakfast with the prince and his family and introduces himself as the hedgehog, explaining his mother's hasty wish was the cause of his animal form. The prince's elder daughters kill themselves out of envy: one throws herself from a window and the other jumps into a well. As for the girl, she lives happily ever after with her human husband.

In a Czech tale collected by Czech etnographer Josef Štefan Kubín from Jicin, Podkrkonosie, from informant Anna Kulíčková, with the title Ježek princem ("Hedgehog Prince"), a servant does not have children. His wife complains and wishes they had a child. Suddenly, a little animal, a hedgehog, rolls out of the stove, and the man mocks his wife that her wish has been granted, since the hedgehog will prick her with its quills. Still, the hedgehog asks for a trumpet and a herd, which he drives in the forest. In the forest, he rests in the hollow of an oak tree while the animals graze about. Suddenly, a king loses his way during a hunt along with a servant. The servant finds the hedgehog's herding staff, deduces there is a herd nearby so the servant goes to talk to the hedgehog, asking him for help in getting out of the forest. The king asks the hedgehog to help him leave the forest, and the hedgehog asks for a reward to be given a princess. The king and hedgehog sign a deal with an oak leaf, and the little animal leads the king's horse through the forest. The hedgehog's adoptive human father laments that he has not seen his son in three years, when he and the other peasants hear the noise the animals make in their return out of the forest. Later, the hedgehog son asks his father to saddle as rooster to serve as his mount and ride to the king's palace. Once there, the hedgehog announces his presence, and the king asks his three daughters which will go with the little animal: the elder answers she would rather jump from the highest window, the middle one that she would rather jump into a well, and the youngest agrees to marry him. After the wedding, as the couple go to bed, the hedgehog gives the princess a knife and asks her to cut his skin open from the neck below. The princess does as instructed, and out of the hedgehog skin comes a handsome prince with a star on the chest. The following morning, the elder princesses learn that the hedgehog turned into a prince, and the elder leaps out of the window and the other into a well. The princess and the prince live in happiness.

=== Baltic Region ===
==== Estonia ====
In the Estonian Catalogue, the type is known as ATU 441, Siil pojaks ("The Hedgehog as Son"): a childless couple longs for a son and wishes for one that may even look like a hedgehog, so their wish is granted. The hedgehog grows up, works as a herd and tries to woo a princess. The king is then forced to give one of his daughters in marriage: only the youngest princess agrees, and she disenchants the hedgehog with three sticks. According to the Estonian scholars, the tale type is "little known" in the country, with thirteen variants recorded, registered mostly in Järva County and nearby, and two in Hiiumaa.

In an Estonian tale collected by Oskar Loorits and translated into German as Wer will den Igel heiraten? ("Who shall marry the Hedgehog?"), a rich, but childless couple longs to have a son, even if he is a hedgehog, so one is born to them. After he grows up, he overhears his father saying that he can herd the cows, so he climbs on an ox's horns and herds the cows. The next time, he overhears his mother saying that, if he wasn't an animal, he could find a bride, so the hedgehog rides a rooster and goes to a man's house to court his daughters. The man asks his three daughters which shall marry the little animal: the elder two refuse, but the youngest agrees. On the wedding day, before the hedgehog and the girl arrive at church, the hedgehog asks her to find three sticks in a bush and hit him with them. The girl follows his orders and turns him to human shape, while the quills on the hedgehog's skin turn to gold coins.

In an Estonian tale titled Siilist poeg ("Hedgehog Son"), a couple have no children. One day, the woman sighs out loud that she wants a child, even if he looks like a hedgehog. Thus, one is born to them. The hedgehog son lives bu the ashes of the hearth. After an initial period of happiness for a son, they soon lament the fact their son is a little animal. When the son is ten years old, the mother laments that he could herd animals if he was human. The hedgehog then goes to the yard, jumps onto a large bull's horns and herds the animals by commanding them in the forest during lunchtime. Years pass, and the hedgehog son grows to youth. At this time, his mother laments that he could have found a bride by now. Thus, the hedgehog rides a rooster to find a bride. He reaches the house of a family where three sisters live. He enters the house and reveals their father the reason for his visit. The man then asks his daughter which will go with the little animal: the eldest says she would rather jump into a fire, the middle one that she would rather be hanged, and the youngest agrees to marry him. They give porridge to the hedgehog and oats for the rooster. The following morning, on the way to the wedding, the hedgehog asks his bride to pluck a stick from a hazelbush and hit him three times. The girl does so: on the first two times, the quills on his body fall to the ground, and on the third time, the hedgehog turns into a handsome youth. His quills have turned into pieces of gold. They gather all the money and go to the wedding. The youth brings back to his parents a daughter-in-law and gold, to their happiness. As for his sisters-in-law, they cry their eyes out for not marrying the hedgehog.

==== Lithuania ====
Lithuanian folklorist Jonas Balys, in his analysis of Lithuanian folktales (published in 1936), listed 19 variants of type 441, Ežys - karaliaus žentas ("Hedgehog as King's Son-in-Law"). In a later revision of the catalogue, professor Bronislava Kerbelyte renames it as type AT 441, Ežiukas, with 67 variants registered.

In a Lithuanian variant collected by linguist August Leskien and Karl Brugman, Vom Igel, der die Königstochter zur Frau bekam ("About the Hedgehog who took the King's Daughter for Wife"), a poor man adopts a hedgehog from the forest. The animal decides to fatten its father's pig in order to give birth to more piglets. The usual story occurs, but the narrative does not mention that the hedgehog becomes human. They also noted that this Lithuanian tale lacked the usual beginning of the mother's hasty wish and the ending with the prince's disenchantment.

==== Latvia ====
According to the Latvian Folktale Catalogue, tale type ATU 441 is quite well known in Latvia, indexed as type 441, Ezītis-dēls ("The Hedgehog as Son"): a couple adopts a hedgehog as their son, and he works as a shepherd; later, he marries a princess, who takes his hedgehog skin and burns it.

In a Latvian tale translated into German as Das Igelpelzchen and into English as The Porcupine's Little Quill Coat, a poor couple prays to have a son, even if he is a little hedgehog. Suddenly, a hedgehog appears to them and declares to be their son. Years later, the little hedgehog offers to take care of their pigs. Three years pass, and the little hedgehog becomes a fine swineherd. One day, the ruler of the country loses his way in the forest and the little animal offers his help, in exchange for the ruler's youngest daughter in marriage. The ruler refuses and keeps losing his way in the woods, until he relents and accepts the hedgehog's proposal. The ruler's youngest daughter marries the hedgehog and takes him to the bridal chambers. The animal takes off the animal skin. The girl takes the animal skin and burns it. However, her husband (now a man) has a fever and a pained state, but endures it and becomes a man for good.

=== Romani people ===
In a tale collected by Joseph Valet from a Manouche teller named Bitilette Warner, with the Manouche title O púmpelo Níglo, translated as Le hérisson plein de pus ("The Pus-Filled Hedgehog"), a poor peasant couple has no children. One day, the husband finds a hedgehog in a hedge and adopts it as their son. The man hears a voice calling him, and sees that the hedgehog is talking. Sometime later, the hedgehog asks his father to buy three roosters for him: a white one, a red one and a black one. The man buys the birds and the little hedgehog rides the bird to the local castle to court one of the princesses. The king gives him the elder, who he takes to a big tree. The animal circles the tree three times and asks her if she would marry him, since he starts to leak pus. The elder princess refuses, so he brings her back and takes the middle one, who also refuses due to his ugly state. The hedgehog takes the cadette to the tree and asks her the same question, and the youngest princess admits she loves him. The couple to go the castle and the elder princesses mock their sibling, but the girl wants to marry him. The priest bars the hedgehog from entering church, and the hedgehog lets the princess go ahead of him while he goes to bake some cakes. The princess decides to spy on him and sees the hedgehog removing his skin and becoming a handsome prince. She burns the animal skin in the oven and goes to embrace and kiss her bridegroom, then shows him to her sisters. The now human hedgehog and the princess marry.

== Other adaptations ==
=== Books ===
- Hans my Hedgehog was readapted by the German children's book-writer Janosch, in Janosch erzählt Grimms Märchen 1972, translated as Not Quite as Grimm. As Jack Zipes summarizes, "Hans is transformed from a porcupine looking character into a hippy rock singer, who plays the harmonica. When his father gives him sunglasses and a motorcycle to get rid of him, he goes into the city and eventually becomes a movie star named Jack Eagle (Jack Adler). In the end the father is proud of him, and everyone from the village wants to look like him."
- It was adapted into a children's book in 2012. The book is titled Hans My Hedgehog and is written by Kate Coombs and illustrated by John Nickle. The book is published by Atheneum Books for Young Readers and has the ISBN 978-1416915331.
- Andrzej Sapkowski's short story "A Question of Price" in The Last Wish collection is inspired by Hans My Hedgehog.
- "The Hedgehog Boy: A Latvian Folktale", retold by Jane Langton and illustrated by Ilse Plume.

=== Television ===
- The story was featured as a cel animated short (Hungarian: Sündisznó) in the "Hungarian Folktales" episode of the 1989~1993 U.S.A. TV series Long Ago and Far Away.
- A version of it was also produced as an episode of Jim Henson's The StoryTeller which stars Jason Carter as Hans' human form, Terence Harvey as the voice of Hans the Hedgehog, Abigail Cruttenden as the Princess, David Swift as the King, Helen Lindsay as the Queen, Eric Richard as the Farmer, and Maggie Wilkinson as the Farmer's Wife. The episode combines the story with The Enchanted Pig.
- The Hexer and The Witcher, adapted from Andrzej Sapkowski's The Witcher books, both include an adaptation of "A Question of Price", the short story based on Hans My Hedgehog.

=== Podcasts ===
In 2025, the tale featured on the Three Bean Salad podcast. On the Episode titled 'And Then Sparrows Took Their Eyes: Hans the Hedgehog'. Henry Paker read out the tale and discussed it in a humorous way with co-presenters Benjamin Partridge and Mike Wozniak.

== See also ==
- The Hedgehog, the Merchant, the King and the Poor Man (Hungarian tale)
