= The Pig King =

Italian fairy tale

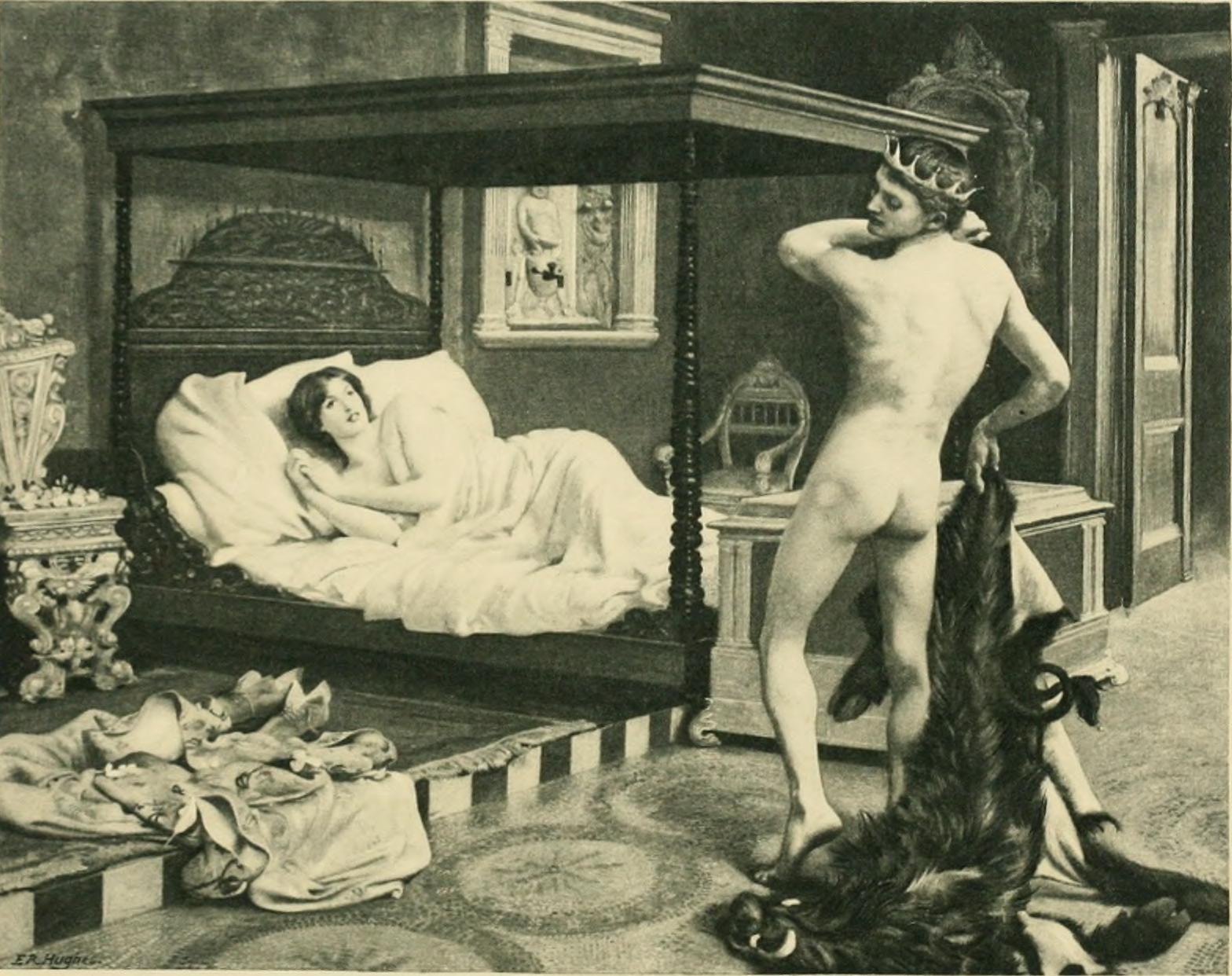
The prince sheds the pig skin

"The Pig King" or "King Pig" (Italian: Il re porco) is an Italian literary fairy tale written by Giovanni Francesco Straparola in his The Facetious Nights of Straparola. Madame d'Aulnoy wrote a French, also literary, variant, titled Prince Marcassin.

== Source ==
The story Il re porco ("King Pig") occurs as the first story on the second night of Straparola's Nights.

== Synopsis ==
A king and a queen had no children after seven years. One day, the queen slept in the garden, and three fairies saw her. One gave her a son and that no man could harm her; the second, that no one could offend her, and the son should have every virtue; the third, that she would be wise, but the son should be a pig until he had married three times. Soon after, the queen had a son in the form of a pig. The king at first thought to throw the pig into the sea, but decided against it, and had him raised as a child. He learned to talk, but wallowed in mud whenever he could. One day, he told his mother that he wished to marry and persisted until the queen persuaded a poor woman to give her oldest daughter to him. The girl was persuaded by her mother but resolved to kill her bridegroom their wedding night. In the night, he stabbed her with his hooves, and she died. He then asked to marry her sister, and she was persuaded, but she died as her sister had. Finally, he married the third. The third sister behaved politely to him, and returned his caresses. Soon after their marriage, the prince revealed a secret to her: he took off his pigskin and became a handsome young man in her bed. Every morning, he put the skin back on, but she was glad to have a man as her husband. Soon, she gave birth to a child, a son in human form. But finally, the princess revealed the secret to the king and queen and told them to come to the bedchamber at night. They did, and saw their son. The king had the pigskin, lying to one side, torn to pieces, and then abdicated and had his son crowned. He was known as King Pig, and lived long and happily with his queen.

=== Prince Marcassin ===
Madame d'Aulnoy greatly expanded the tale. Her tale is sometimes translated as The Wild Boar or Prince Wild Boar.

A queen who desperately wants to have a child dreams that three fairies talk about giving her a child: one gives her a handsome, amiable, and loved son; the second gives her to see the son succeed at everything; and the third muttered something under her breath. The king is anxious that the third fairy meant ill, but the queen is convinced her desire for a child made her dream it.

Soon after, she gives birth. The child is not a son but a wild boar. His father is persuaded not to drown him by his wife, who thinks the child has misfortune enough in being born a pig. They try to raise him as a prince. At the same place where she dreamed, the queen is told that one day the prince will look handsome to her. Marcassin learns to speak and walk on his hind legs, and in many ways learns how to act the prince.

A woman named Ismene, the oldest of three sisters, is in love with a man named Coridon, and their marriage is agreed on. Marcassin interferes and insists that she marry him, even when his mother tries to argue him from it, because it is beneath his rank, and princesses, being less free than other women, would marry him. Ismene's mother, being ambitious, fully supports Marcassin. The wedding is held, but Ismene and Coridon kill themselves before the wedding night.

Although Marcassin laments Ismene's death, he falls in love with her second sister, Zelonide. She is persuaded to marry him as her sister was, and on the wedding day, she conspires to kill him, but she does not check her confidante, and he is the prince. She tries to kill him without help, and he kills her. He flees to the forest to avoid any more such events.

The mother of Ismene and Zelonide, regretting how she forced her daughters, retreats to the country with her youngest daughter, Marthesie. There Marthesie meets Marcassin, who falls in love with her but laments to her that his having caused so much evil to her family will make it impossible. She decides to marry him if only he will leave the forest. He tricks her into a grotto where she cannot escape, and she decides that she will marry him after all. When they go to bed, she finds him a man. One day, while he is asleep, she finds his pig skin. She wakes him, and he tells her that the third fairy had wished him to be a wild boar until he had married three times, and his third wife had found his pigskin.

Three white and three black distaffs comes into their room, and a voice says they will be happy if they guess what they are. Marcassin guesses that the white ones are the fairies, and Marthesie, the black ones are her sisters and Coridon. This reveals them in their true shapes, because the fairies had rescued those three from death.

== Variants ==
=== Other literary versions ===
French author Henriette-Julie de Murat also delved in the theme of a swine suitor with her literary fairy tale Le Roy Porc, published in 1699. Scholarship acknowledges she seems to have borrowed the theme from Straparola's version. In de Murat's version, seventeen-year-old princess Ondine is the object of amorous intentions of the titular Pig King and of Pactole, a riff on the river-god Pactolus.

=== Oral variants ===
==== The King's Little Son, a Pig ====
In an Italian tale collected by scholar Domenico Comparetti with the title Il figliuolo del re, maiale ("The King's Little Son, a Pig"), sourced from Monferrato, a king has a pig for a son, who is a swine by day and at night a handsome knight, and eats like a person, but he is hidden in a corner of the palace. After twenty years, the king notices that the castle is shaking: it is his son, jumping up and down and shaking the ground, since he wants to marry. The pig prince chooses the daughters of a miller, starting with the eldest one. The king sends for the miller, who agrees to marry the eldest daughter to the prince, since she is an ambitious girl. The eldest sister marries the pig, and the pig eats food from his bride's plate, but she rebuffs him with a fork and knifes his snout so hard it bleeds. The couple retires to the bedroom, and the pig removes his pigskin to become a handsome youth, but with a bleeding face. He accuses the girl of mistreating him, when she could have him for companion for a lifetime, and now he must kill her. He then takes a sword and kills her. The following morning, the court finds the girl dead. After three months, the pig son jumps up and down again, this time even stronger, to call his father's attention for another marriage. This time he wants the middle sister, who agrees after some indecision on her part. During the feast, the pig tries to eat some food from his bride's plate, and she attacks him with her fork, injuring his snout many times. For this, he tears apart the girl on the wedding night. Lastly, after five months, he wants to marry yet again - this time, to the youngest daughter. The king agrees, but issues an ultimatum that this is the last time. The pig marries the youngest sister. During the meal, the pig eats from her plate, and she wipes his snout with a handkerchief. During the night, the pig becomes a handsome youth. The bride offers him some flatbread to eat, and he remains human forever. In the morning, they find that the third girl is safe, and they celebrate a new wedding.

==== The Son of King, a Pig (Marche) ====
In an Italian tale collected by author Antonio Gianandrea with the title Er fijo de' re, puorco ("The Son of a King, a Pig"), sourced from Fabriano, a king has a pig for a son, who is a swine by day and at night a handsome youth. After twenty years, the king is sitting at a table when he notices that the castle is shaking: it is his son, jumping up and down and shaking the ground, since he wants to marry. The pig prince chooses the daughters of a miller, starting with the eldest one. The king sends for the miller, who agrees to marry the eldest daughter to the prince, since she has ambitions of becoming queen. The eldest sister marries the pig, and the pig eats food from his bride's plate, but she rebuffs him with a fork and knifes his snout so hard it bleeds. The couple retires to the bedroom, and the pig removes his pigskin to become a handsome youth, but with a bleeding face. He accuses the girl of mistreating him and they cannot be at peach; instead, she will die by his hand - so he takes a sword and kills her. The following morning, the court finds the girl dead. After a while, the pig son jumps up and down again, this time even stronger, to call his father's attention for another marriage. This time he wants the middle sister, who agrees after some indecision on her part. During the feast, the pig tries to eat some food from his bride's plate, and she attacks him with her fork, injuring his snout many times. For this, he tears the girl to pieces. After another while, he wants to marry yet again - this time, to the youngest daughter. The king agrees, but issues an ultimatum that this is the last time. The pig marries the youngest sister. During the meal, the pig eats from her plate, and she wipes his snout with a handkerchief. During the night, the pig becomes a handsome youth. The bride offers him a focaccia ("crescia" in the Marchegian text). In the morning, they find that the third girl is safe, and they celebrate a new wedding.

==== The Pig King (Spello) ====
Author Stanislao Prato collected a tale from Spello with the title Il re porco ("The Pig King"). In this tale, a stingy queen refuses to give alms to a beggar woman, who is a Fairy. The old woman curses the queen for her son to be born as a pig. Thus, a pig is born to her. They raise the prince as the pig he is, and walk with him in some swamps for him to wallow in the mud. One day, he is walking on the street and sees a baker's beautiful daughter, wantint to marry her. He returns home and grumbles his intentions to his mother. The king sends an envoy with a bag of gold to arrange for the wedding. The baker and his wife agree to his daughter's marriage, and their wedding is celebrated. The pig prince rides in a carriage with his bride, wearing a splendid dress studded with gems, and stops by a puddle to play in the mud. He then returns to the carriage and nuzzles his bride's lap, dirtying her dress. The baker's daughter rebuffs him and calls him a dirty pig. That same night, the pig prince takes the bride home and strangles her in her sleep. The following morning, the queen finds the dead daughter-in-law and suspects her son did it. A few days later, the pig prince passes by the countryside, spots the baker's middle daughter and wishes to marry her. He marries the middle daughter and also kills her. Lastly, he marries the baker's youngest daughter. On the carriage ride on the road, the pig prince stops the carriage to play in the mud, then returns to the carriage and jumps onto the bride's lap, dirtying her dress. This time, the girl simply laughs at the situation - as she has been instructed by the queen to not be upset at the pig prince's behaviour -, and produces a handkerchief to wipe him. The tale explains this act of kindness is enough to break the fairy's curse. That same night, the couple retired to bed, and the queen finds her son in human form, not as a pig, and rushes to tell the king about it. They hold a splendid celebration.

==== The Pig and the Three Sisters ====
In an Italian tale from Sardegna with the Sardinian title Su procu e is tres sorrese, translated as Il maiale e le tre sorelle ("The Pig and the Three Sisters"), a queen has no children, so she prays to God (Bon Jesú) to have a son, even if he looks like a pig. Thus, a pig is born to her. The pig prince grows up and asks his mother to find him a bride. The queen questions who would marry a pig, and the prince directs her to a person who has three daughters. He asks the eldest daughter in marriage, and she agrees to a marriage, since he is a king's son. The pig and the elder sister go to church, and he goes to take a dip in the mud, then joins his bride. The girl is horrified at this and calls him a pig ("maiale"). For this, the pig prince kills her. Some days later, the pig prince wants to marry again; the queen starts to object, since he killed the previous one, but the prince asks for the second sister. They go to church, and he rolls in the mud again, then joins his bride. The second sister calls him a pig due to his behaviour. For this, the pig strikes the girl dead. Sometime later, the pig son asks his mother to bring the third sister for him to marry, The woman worries about the third girl's potential death, but she fulfills her son's request. The pig son marries the girl. During the wedding, he takes a bath in the mud, and his third bride feels sorry for him, then washes his body in a large basin, then dries him off. The pig is happy after being washed. The couple retires to bed, and the pig son removes his pigskin, becoming a fine man. The tale explains that the man is wearing the pigskin disguise as atonement for his mother's wish. The tale ends.

== Analysis ==
=== Tale type ===
It is grouped as Aarne-Thompson type 441 "Hans My Hedgehog", whose type tale is Grimms' fairy tale KHM 108, "Hans My Hedgehog". An opening episode to the Romanian work The Enchanted Pig also belongs in the group.

=== Motifs ===
In "The Pig King", the mother's urging her daughters to marry the beast because of the financial benefits for the family—the queen has pointed out that the son and his bride will inherit the kingdom after she and the king die—represents a factor clearly present in arranged marriages. This tale has been interpreted as symbolically representing an arranged marriage; the bride's revulsion to marrying a stranger being symbolized by his bestial form.

==== The animal husband ====
Polish philologist Mark Lidzbarski noted that the pig prince usually appears in Romance language tales, while the hedgehog as the animal husband occurs in Germanic and Slavic tales. Also, according to Swedish folklorist Waldemar Liungman and Christine Shojaei Kawan (in Enzyklopädie des Märchens), in type ATU 441 the animal husband may be a hedgehog, a wild boar or a porcupine. The Grimms' notes state that in these fairy tales, "Hedgehog, porcupine, and pig are here synonymous, like Porc and Porcaril".

Italian writer Italo Calvino noted that "the folktale about the swine king is one of the most widespread in Italy". A similar opinion was given by Letterio di Francia: he concluded that in many Italian variants the prince is either transformed into a serpent or is an enchanted pig. Professor Don Beecher considers that Straparola's tale is the "literary ancestor" of tales with the pig prince collected later from oral tradition.

== See also ==
- Hans My Hedgehog
- King Crin (Italian fairy tale)
- Ni no Kuni: Features a playable character, Marcassin, the Porcine Prince of Hamelin
- The Donkey
- The Fisher-Girl and the Crab
- The Pretty Little Calf
- The Frog Prince
- Beauty and the Beast
- The Story of King Pig
