= Roșia =

Roșia may refer to several places in Romania:

- Roșia, Bihor, a commune in Bihor County
- Roșia, Sibiu, a commune in Sibiu County
- Roșia, a village in Dieci Commune, Arad County
- Roșia, a village in Balșa Commune, Hunedoara County
- Roșia, a village in Căzănești Commune, Mehedinți County
- Roșia, a village in Alunu Commune, Vâlcea County
- Roșia Nouă, a village in Petriș Commune, Arad County
- Roșia-Jiu, a village in Fărcășești Commune, Gorj County
- Roșia Montană, a commune in Alba County
- Roșia Nouă, a village in Petriș Commune, Arad County

== See also ==
- Roșu (disambiguation)
- Roșieni (disambiguation)
- Roșiori (disambiguation)
- Roșioara (disambiguation)
