= Bobu =

Bobu or BOBU may refer to:

- Bobu, a village in Scoarța Commune, Gorj County, Romania
- Bobu, a village in Osica de Jos Commune, Olt County, Romania
- Bobu, a tributary of the Blahnița in Gorj County, Romania
- Bobu (Olteț), a tributary of the Olteț in Dolj and Olt Counties, Romania
- Bobu, a tributary of the Teleajen in Prahova County, Romania
- Bank of Baroda Uganda Limited (BOBU)
- Bobu, a taxonomic synonym of the plant genus Symplocos
