= Roșieni =

Roşieni may refer to several villages in Romania:

- Roşieni, a village in Mociu Commune, Cluj County
- Roşieni, a village in Breasta Commune, Dolj County
- Roşienii Mari and Roşienii Mici, villages in Dobrun Commune, Olt County

== See also ==
- Roșu (disambiguation)
- Roșia (disambiguation)
- Roșiori (disambiguation)
- Roșioara (disambiguation)
