= Păcală =

Character in Romanian folklore

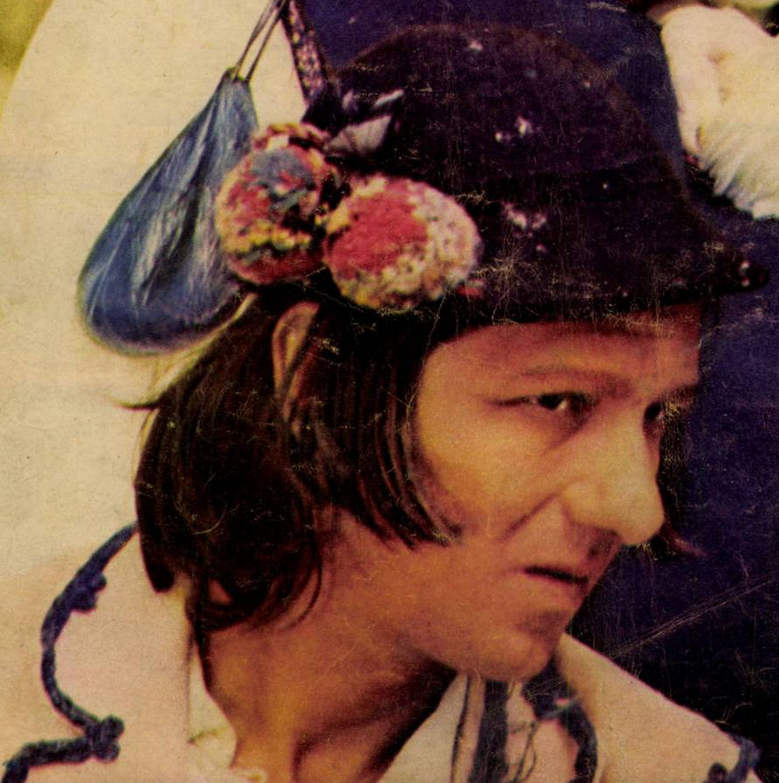
- Sebastian Papaiani in-character as Păcală in 1973

Creature information
- Other name(s): Pâcală, Pîcală
- Grouping: Folk hero
- Folklore: Romanian (also Gagauz)

Origin
- Region: Oltenia, Transylvania (principally)

Păcală (Romanian, from a păcăli, "to dupe"; Romanian Cyrillic: Пъкалъ; sometimes rendered Pâcală or Pîcală) is a fictional character in Romanian folklore, literature and humor. Primarily associated with Transylvania and Oltenia, he is depicted as a native of Vaideeni, located in an area of contact between those two regions. An irreverent young man, seemingly a peasant, he reserves contempt and irony for the village authorities (whether Orthodox priest, boyar or judge), but often plays the fool, or displays an erratic and criminal behavior that scholars attribute to the eclecticism of sources weaved into the narrative. Păcală seems to be at least partly modeled on other characters in European folklore, in particular Giufà and Till Eulenspiegel. He may therefore be borrowed from Western chapbooks, with scholar Traian Bratu hypothesizing that Romanians were introduced to the Eulenspiegel anecdotes by their prolonged contact with the Transylvanian Saxons. The stories were then adapted and, in at least some cases, substantially modified, for instance by the addition of a native mythological layer, and by the appearance of a sidekick, the more slow-witted Tândală.

The first written mentions of Păcală are found in early-to-mid 19th-century Saxon and other German collections of Romanian tales, which identify him as distinct from Eulenspiegel. He then became a subject of interest for Romanian writers, originally with spin-off parodies of oral accounts, generally with political content. These were produced by authors from various regions—including Costache Negruzzi, Alexandru Pelimon, Ion Heliade Rădulescu, Vasile Alecsandri, and Iosif Vulcan. From the 1860s, the stories were also collected and expanded upon in a number of editions, creating an opportunity for updated and polished versions of the myth. Several derivative works codify the various versions of Păcală-themed anecdotes. Early on, Petre Ispirescu issued a printed version as Întâmplările lui Păcală ("The Adventures of Păcală"), part of Legende sau basmele românilor. This was followed closely by Isprăvile lui Păcală ("Păcală's Achievements"), authored by Petre Dulfu, then by Păcală în satul lui ("Păcală in His Village"), composed by Ioan Slavici. Some variants obscure those accounts which have Păcală interacting with figures in Christian mythology, and focus more or less exclusively on his relationship with anti-clericalism. Many versions, particularly derivative ones produced under the communist regime, promote his image as an anti-establishment folk hero.

First adapted as a character for Romanian theater in three plays by Alecsandri, he was readapted by Victor Eftimiu in 1911, with Înșir'te mărgărite, and again by Horia Furtună, in 1927; numerous puppet and children's theater versions have followed. Romanian cinema had begun exploring the notion of a Păcală-based feature film in 1914, with Aurel Petrescu working the subject matter into the first product of Romanian animation (in 1921), and then into a live-action film (1926). Also the subject of an opera by Sabin Drăgoi, he inspired Tudor Arghezi to write a poetic cycle and encourage a new project in cinema, undertaken by Geo Saizescu. Saizescu only completed his film in 1974—a box-office success, it made its lead, Sebastian Papaiani, be widely perceived as Păcală's real-life version.

== Borrowings and specificity ==
=== Păcală, Eulenspiegel, Bertoldo ===
The Păcală stories are not traditionally connected to all regions covered by Romanian-speakers, with his presence being the least attested in eastern areas. As noted in 1936 by Bratu, in Western Moldavia (and, by extension, Bessarabia) he is less popular than another stock character, known as "Pepelea". In a 1988 overview, folklorist Cristea Sandu Timoc included Pepelea as a stand-in for Păcală, concluding: "There are today over 100 known variants of the Păcală cycle, spread out all over the historical provinces, and more frequently encountered in Transylvania." He himself authenticated five Păcală anecdotes from Serbian Romanian communities on the Timok Valley (a sample which includes Vlach villages). Writer Ion Agârbiceanu, who lived at Yelisavetgrad in 1917, reported being the person to have introduced Ukrainian Romanians (or "Moldavians") to Păcală's narrative cycle; by contrast, the non-Romanian Gagauz people have adopted Păcală as a stock character, alongside Nasreddin. Păcală's archetypal nature, however, connects him to the areal covered by European folklore—prompting comparisons from as early as the 1880s, when Simeon Mangiuca noted links with Kullervo and Giufà. Ethnologist Ion Taloș describes the Kullervo theory as baseless, while noting that Păcală's origin in Italian folklore is entirely plausible. Scholar Ovidiu Bârlea similarly noted analogies between Păcală, Giufà, and Djoha, the latter of whom is widely present in Arab culture.

The stories' mention of Vaideei as Păcală's village ties Păcală closely to an ethnographic area bridging Transylvania and northern Oltenia, though some authors prefer the similarly named Vaideeni, Vâlcea County—also in Oltenia. The first reconstructed variant of the name is Vaideești, appearing a 1498 writ. The modern Vaideeni is generally approximated as vai de ei, "woe to them", but linguists have criticized that reading as folk etymology, or as an intentional pun: Iorgu Iordan recalled an informant from Vaideeni that "it's as a jest that we call it Vaideei" (ne rîdem noi de-i zicem Vaideei). A local tradition recorded by novelist Ioana Postelnicu contrarily reports that Vaideeni was originally known as Vaideei, identifying its settlers by their striking poverty. In this version, the Oltenian village was founded by shepherds fleeing Habsburg Transylvania. A field report by ethnographer Ioana Armășescu dates the name to the 16th century, noting that it referred to the original inhabitants being pushed into serfdom by Bistrița Monastery; she recounts that the Transylvanian arrivals were in fact a privileged population, attracted on the estate with fiscal privileges and kept distinct from the surrounding Oltenians. All readings as vai de ei are rejected by philologist Diomid Strungaru, who proposes that "Vaideeni" and "Vaideei" are actually genitives of Vayda.

Bratu also notes that Păcală developed in close proximity to the Transylvanian Saxons, who may have introduced locals to Till Eulenspiegel and the Schildbürger chapbooks. He reports that the Romanian cycle includes punchlines which only make sense in German—his cooking of two dogs named after condiments seems to be entirely based on a fragment of Eulenspiegel, which centers on an untranslatable wordplay on the word Hopfen ("hops"); the Păcală cycle also draws heavily on elements of material culture that were at the time not popular among Romanians, but prevalent among the urbanized Saxons (such as roof tiles and waste collection). Writer János Ábrahám also reports that Hungarian folklore in Transylvania (as written down by László Merényi) conserves the character "Jankó Gügye", who appears as an unluckier version of Păcală. Scholar Victor Crăciun proposes that the theme originates in the Early Modern period, when Romanians in both Danubian Principalities, as well as in the Principality of Transylvania, became acquainted not just with Eulenspiegel, but also with Aesop's Fables and with Giulio Cesare Croce's Bertoldo series, synthesizing all disparate elements into a coherent new lore; their first written anecdotes are in early-19th-century almanacs. Specific episodes narrated about Păcală include his being tied in a burlap sack, which is similar to a Bertoldo anecdote. Playwright and essayist Victor Eftimiu also identified episodes and plot devices taken from "other peoples", including "The Hunchback's Tale" from One Thousand and One Nights and Breton variants of "Idiot John" (see The Hedley Kow).

An early complete variant of Păcală was itself the product of foreign influence. As noted by philologist Ovidiu Papadima, this work was done in German by Arthur Schott, a Württemberger agronomist in Austrian Transylvania; it adapts the hero's name as Bakála. In this version, published in 1845 at Stuttgart, there were 13 individual anecdotes. A Saxon folklorist, Franz Obert, was similarly active in collecting stories from Romanian Transylvanian peasants, rendering the character's name as Bacale. A century later, Bratu reported on there being "over 30 Păcală achievements", of which only eight were Eulenspiegel-modeled. The adaptation often has hints of national specificity, especially as a form of irreverent protest against boyars and landowners; according to Crăciun, it closely mirrors other wisecracking tricksters, with different names, appearing in tales by Creangă, Anton Pann, and Ion Luca Caragiale; a similar point was made by scholar Nicolae Manolescu, in reference to Creangă's Dănilă Prepeleac.

=== Wickedness versus heroism ===
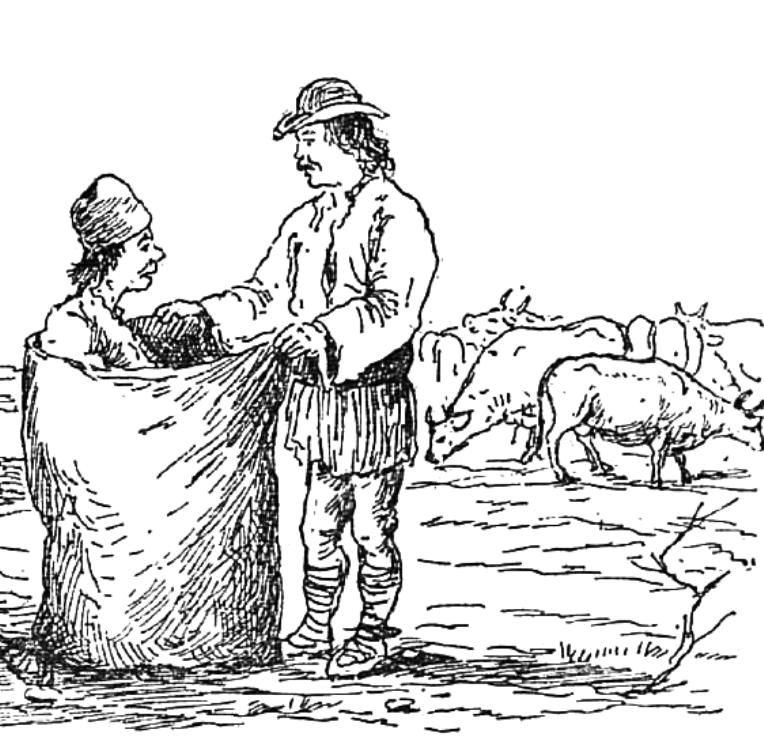
Sentenced to death by drowning, Păcală tricks the ignorant cowherd into taking his place in the burlap sack. Illustration by Constantin Jiquidi, Petre Dulfu version (1894)

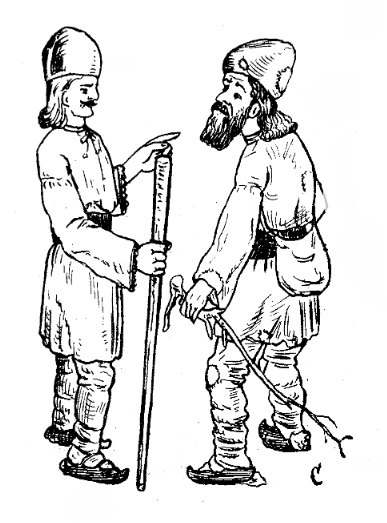
Păcală (left) and Tândală in an anonymous illustration of 1907

Local input resulted in the creation of some 85 Păcală types, all of them inventoried by Dulfu in his 1890s investigation of folk literature. In a 1927 piece, columnist Pamfil Șeicaru spoke of the definitive Păcală as embodying "the Romanian people's satirical intelligence, a devilish exploitation of all forms of human weakness only for the pleasure of laughing out loud"; "underneath his rather silly facade, a parody of naivete, [he] is the first Romanian satirical poet, one who, instead of writing, turned satire into deeds." According to Eftimiu: "Another popular figure [in Romanian folklore] is that lad Păcală, who has all sorts of adventures, who makes a mockery of brigands, of publicans, of priests, of the devil himself. He embodies a Romanian type, filled with revolt and yet cheerful, resourceful and yet improvident." Film critic and psychiatrist Ion Filotti Cantacuzino likewise notes: "Păcală [stands for] all the humorous and common-sense qualities, all the glittering wit and biting irony one sees in the Romanian peasant." Păcală and Pepelea's negative traits, including their "wickedness", were recognized by Bratu, and before him by Moses Gaster and Lazăr Șăineanu, as differentiating them from Bertoldo and Eulenspiegel (though, Bratu notes, the episodes in which Păcală instigates or carries out murder are exceptionally crass, and therefore must be seen as tongue-in-cheek). Eftimiu entertained the belief that Păcală was ultimately a "Nibelung, a demonic character", whose name was ultimately derived from a Slavic term for fog (producing the Romanian pâclă). However, he objected to Șăineanu and Ion Aurel Candrea's description of Păcală as an "imbecile".

The issue of Păcală's occasional foolishness was explored by critic Dumitru Evolceanu, within his larger essay about the sources of folklore. As Evolceanu puts it: "Folk poetry [...] travels around by word of mouth, and in its travels gets picked up by more or less clever people, endlessly transforming itself in accordance with the heads it comes into contact with." As a result, "one of the better known Păcală stories has him displaying all the signs of a perfect imbecile on one page, and then on the next he is a skilled diplomat." An intermediary position was advanced by Bârlea, who writes that Păcală, Pepelea, Eulenspiegel and Djoha all personify "unrelenting aspiration of the popular masses toward social justice and equity". He adds:

In our national repertoire, the figure of Păcală (Pepelea) is a more complex one, resulting from juxtaposition and contamination. He appears in certain anecdotes as the embodiment of inveterate stupidity—according to unanimous opinion, this belongs to the most archaic stratum, already present among the primitive peoples, where a culture hero is also the buffoon [...]. In our own folklore, Păcală sometimes simulates stupidity, in that his accomplished deeds presuppose a submerged deftness, as revealed in circumstances where he exploits the literal sense of figurative expressions, or even figurative words, only for the purpose of drawing out the most irrepressible chuckles".

The "devilish aspects" of Păcală's career are also highlighted by philosopher Liviu Mitrănescu, who points out that, in one of the anecdotes, he leads an entire village into drowning by assuring it that there are cattle grazing at the bottom of a river. Most of his mischief, however, is focused on the middle and upper classes—such as when he agrees to serve a boyar, using subterfuge to get a hungry wolf into his sheep-cot, or when he takes revenge on exploitative cattle-traders. In the version penned by Ioan Slavici and paraphrased by his critical biographer Pompiliu Marcea, the drowned (defined here as "all the men of a village, led by their priest") are in fact punished for their greed: "they trusted Păcală's account about gold treasures being located on the river bottom." As Marcea proposes, this rendering makes Păcală into the "instrument of an ethical principle". Sandu Timoc similarly estimates that, in the Serbian Romanian variants of the cycle, Păcală most often exchanges his lines with either boyars or Romanies, and that the "moral and physical defects of people" are favorite targets of his satire.

As Bratu notes, the slow transformation into a folk hero ultimately separated Păcală from Eulenspiegel—Păcală is implictly depicted as immortal, whereas, outside of Charles De Coster's Legend of Thyl, Eulenspiegel is presented as someone to have lived in the past, and whose grave still exists. However, some modernized versions of Păcală similarly end with him "disappearing into the mist", for only his memory to live on, "on the people's lips". Longer versions of the Păcală cycle, which are seen by folklorist Ion Burada as less authentic, include other fantasy elements, such as his visit to Heaven and his subsequent playing of a magic flute or bagpipe. The instrument is awarded to him by God, who is thankful that Păcală has rid Him of disease by burning a bagful of frankincense. The episode was upheld as emblematic by Schott and other reviewers, who proposed that Păcală the piper was the distant echo of a solar deity. According to Eftimiu, this description misses the point; he draws instead parallels between Păcală, on one hand, and, on the other, instrument-playing, animal-taming figures of Greek mythology (Amphion, Orpheus, and Pan).

Another nationally-specific element is the appearance of a sidekick, Tândală, who is likewise diversely depicted. According to Eftimiu, he is mostly a "dense yokel, slow-witted, lazy, and a fumbler." Crăciun notes that he shares traits with Sancho Panza; though sometimes serving as an embodiment of stupidity, and therefore antithetical to Păcală, he is generally depicted as "quite smart [...], more malleable, less of a trickster, and more persistent than his companion." Novelist Liviu Rebreanu gave a short definition of the duo: Păcală — deștept și leneș; Tândală — prost și muncitor ("Păcală — smart and lazy; Tândală — stupid and hard-working"); a similar note was made by literary critic Carol Isac, who distinguished between Păcală's "practical cleverness" and Tândală's "naivete". The stories sometimes show Tândală parting ways with Păcală and trying out his talents in other geographical areas, which serves as a plot device. In one variant, which closely mirrors the Schildbürger cycle, Tândală is imprisoned by an angry mob for lying that "in his village there is an egg, big as an ox (or a head of cabbage, big as a house)". Păcală miraculously arrives in time to save his friend; he presents himself as an independent witness, one who has "seen in my own village, in some peasant's yard, a duck, big as a storehouse (or a cauldron, one as tall as the bell tower)".

== Adaptations ==
=== Early retellings ===
Păcală entered high literature in the age of Neoclassicism and Romanticism. An early mention in Moldavia, which closely predates Schott's collection, is Constantin Negruzzi's sketch story—called Păcală și Tândală, and first appearing in Albina Românească of 1842. It is largely a soliloquy putting together Romanian proverbs—and is posthumously hailed as an early standard of Romanian humor. The story was more substantially used in comedic verse by Wallachia's Ion Heliade Rădulescu. His Tandalida, issued in 1854, mocked national stereotypes, showing Păcală as a Romanian and Tândală, in the leading and anti-heroic role, as a Pole; it saw print in the French Empire, where Heliade was living at the time. That year, Alexandru Pelimon, also a Wallachian citizen, printed his musical comedy, Păcală și Tândală sau Și-a găsit tingirea capac ("Păcală and Tândală, or Here's a Lid for Your Pot"); Pelimon's retouched characters are partly based on Truffaldino and Pantalone, from The Servant of Two Masters.

Moldavia's Vasile Alecsandri similarly penned a "political dialogue", Păcală și Tândală, first printed by Stéoa Dunărei, in 1856. The stock characters were transformed to make a point about Romanian nationalism—Alecsandri canvassed support for the Danubian Principalities' union, with Păcală as the wise and debonair unionist, and Tândală as a retrograde boyar. Early performances in Moldavian theaters doubled as explicitly nationalist manifestations, with performances of Hora Unirii. This cultural elevation was continued by Romanian writers in the 19th-century Kingdom of Hungary (which included Transylvania after 1867). The first folklorist to collect the accounts into a book of fairy-tales was Mircea Vasile Stănescu Arădanul in 1860. Some three years later, Iosif Vulcan, a leader of the Romanian community in Budapest, began publishing there the satirical journal Umoristul, with a permanent column of "Păcală's letters to Tândală". Ion Hintz-Hințescu put out the first Păcală-only volume in 1876, at Brașov, effectively translating from Schott, though the following year saw anecdotes, collected on-site by peasant Ioan Panea, being published in Budapest by Vulcan's Șezătoarea. In the Banat subregion, Mangiuca produced a more extensive version in 1882, adding two more stories and specifying regional variations.

In the Romanian Principality, which resulted from the success of unionist campaigning, the Păcală narratives continued to be sampled for their general value—Petre Ispirescu included them in his 1860s corpus of Romanian fairy tales (Legende sau basmele românilor), and they were condensed into a didactic story by Ion Creangă (1874). Păcală legends served to inspire other creations, including the eponymous satirical magazine put out by Pantazi Ghica in June–November 1860. Alecsandri was also revisiting the theme, with the highly influential fairy-tale comedy, Sânziana și Pepelea, where Păcală and Tândală are depicted as cowardly lackeys to an emperor (a motif probably borrowed from Carlo Gozzi), and then with a manuscript play, Turnul Balamucului ("Bedlam Tower"), which has "Old Man Păcală" as one of the lead characters.

=== Dulfu and Slavici ===
The successor Kingdom of Romania produced a complete edition, Năzdrăvăniile lui Păcală ("Păcală's Mischief"), authored by Iosif Nădejde—originally a series in Contemporanul magazine. Its two distinctive features were the retelling of the story as a picaresque novel, with a unifying thread, and the removal of most references to miraculous phenomena. An illustrated version, appearing in 1896, had drawings by I. K. Hlavsa. This version was highly popular, serving as a template for Dulfu's even more popular verse novel and stage adaptation of it, both of which were produced in Transylvania. The former volume, Isprăvile lui Păcală, is seen by Manolescu as "classical" in format, preserving a standard of Romanian fairy-tales that authors such as Mihai Eminescu had already modified into a "romantic and poetic" form. Its 1894 edition, which received an award from the Romanian Academy, was illustrated by two artists, Hlavsa and Constantin Jiquidi; a 1920 reprint additionally included a cover drawing by Ary Murnu.

In all, there were 21 other editions of Isprăvile published before 1972—the success is attributed by folklorist Iordan Datcu to Dulfu's "tonic" vision, as well as to his respect for the character, whom Dulfu refused to depict as "an idiot". The staff critic at Gazeta Transilvaniei similarly commented that: "Păcală in [Dulfu's] work is superior to his type in many a folk anecdote." The novel had its critics, including Șeicaru, who rated it as "simplistic". Dulfu was also exposed for subtly changing the content of some editions, to make Păcală an exponent of antisemitic ideas, and to include racial stereotypes of Romanian Jews (including in a new set of illustrations). Also in Transylvania, Ioan Slavici, seen by Crăciun as Păcală's "true literary father", reworked the story into a modern narrative, probably using oral reports from in and around Arad as his basis. It first saw print in Tribuna of September 1886, and was also issued as a booklet. According to Marcea, Slavici also exploited the "Păcală motif" in one of his own comedic stories, Petrea prostul ("Petrea the Dunce"), whose protagonist manages to miss out on a long series of material opportunities, but is rewarded by God with a "magical bagpipe". The original myth was by then becoming known to peasants from the Duchy of Bukovina, where woodcarver Ion Pâșlea crafted a critically acclaimed group-statue of a musical band, which was in fact Păcală playing various instruments.

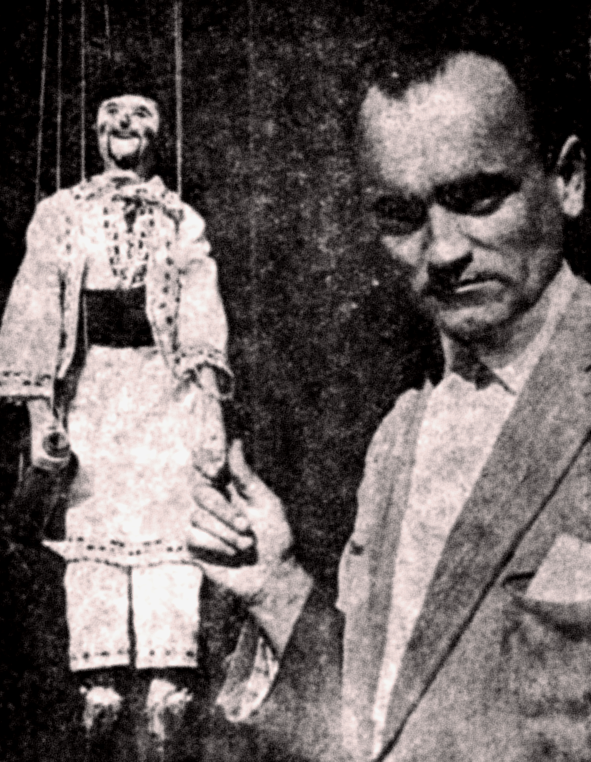
Puppeteer Teodor Năstase of Tinerimea Română with his Păcală marionette, October 1929

In 1911, Eftimiu experienced success with his fairy-tale play Înșir'te mărgărite, which has a Păcală-themed subplot. Three years later, Colonel Petrescu announced that he had obtained financing for a Romanian feature film called Din viața lui Păcală ("Scenes of Păcală's Life"), though it was never produced—and neither was a similar project announced the following decade by Jean Mihail (the latter survived as a screenplay, authored by Scarlat Froda). Another stage adaptation based on Dulfu was done in 1927 by Horia Furtună—receiving poor reviews from Șeicaru, who saw it as a "systematic mockery" of Romanian folklore, and, retrospectively, from literary historian George Călinescu, who found it "chatty". Cartoonist Aurel Petrescu had meanwhile released, in April 1921, the film Păcală în lună ("Păcală on the Moon"), considered as the first work in Romanian animation. Petrescu also managed to release a live-action Păcală și Tândală la București ("Păcală și Tândală in Bucharest") in 1926, but all prints are lost. Also then, both characters were being used as the inspiration for a highly successful revue act, performed by Constantin Tănase, with Păcală also appearing in the debut performance of a puppeteer troupe at Tinerimea Română.

In the late interwar, Rebreanu intended to work the motif into a "national novel", but never managed to write it. As described in his notebooks, the narrative would have included all protagonists of Rebreanu's previous novels, and would have shown a modernized Păcală socially rewarded for the most unscrupulous acts (including desertion from the trenches of World War I). Before his death in 1935, George Emil Botez had been working on new prose and verse version of the stories, probably reusing Nădejde as his source. At the height of World War II, epigrammatist Virgiliu Slăvescu was putting out a new humor magazine titled Păcală. Wartime also witnessed other puppet-theater adaptations, such as one in which Lucia Bârsescu and her Păcală doll entertained the children of Grivița. Another unfinished film project was inaugurated by Jean Georgescu around 1944. His version, based on Dulfu, was to star Grigore Vasiliu Birlic as Păcală and Radu Beligan as his sidekick. Uniquely, Păcală's relatives were to be played by Birlic's real-life family, including sculptor Vasile Vasiliu-Falti.

=== Communist and post-communist revivals ===
Interest in the stories was renewed during the Romanian communist regime (1948–1989). In 1949, Siminel Gheorghiu rewrote some accounts of the Păcală corpus as a short novel, depicting its titular character as the embodiment of "toiling peasants", who always managed to outsmart his boyar employer. A rearrangement of the stories was done in 1950 by Marin D. Marin, as Minunatele isprăvi ale lui Păcală ("Păcală's Wondrous Achievements"). Focusing on the hero's status as a "rebel against the feudal regime" (revoltat împotriva orînduirii feudale) and a friend of the serfs, it adopted the stylistic canons of socialist realism, through direct borrowings from Leonid Solovyov. Writing at the time, Ion Burada suggested that Dulfu's account, which also depicted Păcală's pranks on the more destitute villagers, had required an ideological correction; the updated version also excluded all the remaining fragments which saw Păcală engaging with Christian mythology, such as his visit to Heaven. As reported by Eftimiu, Dulfu himself was again revising his Isprăvile, before his age at age 97, this time striving for a "more correct, contemporary versification".

Early communism saw a number of new publications and performances based on the folkloric tales—including, in 1952, Ion Atanasiu-Atlas' puppet play, Năzdrăvăniile lui Păcală; in 1959, Sabin Drăgoi finished a comedic opera based on the stories. Echoes of the folk myth appear in scattered poems by Tudor Arghezi and Mihai Beniuc; in 1957, the former published a satirical volume, Stihuri pestrițe ("Motley Verses"). One work in this cycle shows Păcală engaged in a polemic with the Romanian diaspora, assuring it that he prefers communism to the "old regime". Also included therein is Balada maeștrilor ("Ballad of the Maestros"), in which Păcală, visiting town to find a cure for his aging donkey, is impressed with the titles that members of the urban elite bestow on each other. The hero himself utters the punchline:

Am aflat și harul
Să-mi pui în picioare bine și măgarul,
Cum ajung acasă, văd eu cît îi este
De fudul auzul, și-o să-l strig Maestre!

Translation:

See now, there's the method — I sure have the luck,
It will get my burro springing off his back.
If he ain't so deaf, and if he needs his luster,
When I get back home, well: I'll call him Master!

The updated and posthumous Dulfu edition came out in 1966, at Editura Tineretului—with an unusually high circulation of 80,000 copies. Children-oriented sequels of the Nădejde–Dulfu account were also being created at that stage. They include Nicolae Labiș's Păcălici și Tîndăleț of 1962, which imagines that Păcală and his sidekick both had children of their own; the same author had published a "strange poem", Slutul ("Ugly Mug"), which references the anecdotes with an added "note of tragedy". The children's-story angle was taken by Constantin S. Nicolăescu-Plopșor's Tivisoc și Tivismoc, which is sometimes read as an "ambitious attempt to complete a folk novel". It specifies Păcală's Oltenian origin and profession (as a salt merchant), but switches focus on his two "unborn children", which give the book its name. In 1973, Corneliu Buzinschi published another Păcală și Tândală, which combines the old anecdotes with a layer of illustrated Romanian proverbs—and is thus Romania's "first paremiological novel".

Another full retelling of the Dulfu cycle was done in 1975 by Alexandru Mitru. According to children's author Gabriella Csire, it followed the general lines established by Dulfu, but was "cleaner and more comprehensible, even by the children." Put out by Editura Ion Creangă, with illustrations by Done Stan, it took a bronze medal at the Leipzig Book Fair of 1977. Two years later, the same company issued a Hungarian translation, penned by Zoltán Veress, which named Păcală as Pável Csala (from csalás, meaning "fraud") and Tódor Suta (from suta, "kludgy"). In that context, Păcală also inspired artist Sandu Florea to create his first comic strip. It was published in the 1968 edition of Luminița magazine, the same year as the performance of another puppet-theater play, Păcală argat ("Păcală as Servant Boy"), by Tudor Cetin and Matei Mureșanu, and Letiția Popa's other adaptation for children, at Ion Creangă Theater (starring Mihai Ioniță). A year later, naive painter Elisabeta Ștefăniță exhibited at the Romanian Atheneum a canvass depicting scenes from the stories.

At around the same time, Tudor Mușatescu was also delving into children's theater, with D-ale lui Păcală ("Păcală Stuff"). A Păcală revue, set to a new text by Ștefan Tita, was staged in 1971 by the Ion Vasilescu Troupe. Similar fragments from Dulfu were included in Ion Lucian's children's show Snoave cu măști ("Masked Anecdotes"), a main feature of the Ion Creangă Theater throughout the 1970s and '80s. The folk-story cycle inspired another play by Traian Chelariu, which appeared in his 1976 volume, Teatru. A Tândală-themed street-theater performance, based on a text by Mihai Crișan, was produced in 1981, with Ștefan Săndulescu appearing as Păcală. The two-man play Păcală și popa, with Dan Tudor and Vasile Tudor, earned its protagonists a debut prize from the Ministry of Culture in 1998. Later children's theater versions include Cristian Pepino and Ioan Brancu's adaptation for Țăndărică Theater, in 2002, and a 2006 production at Merlin Theater of Timișoara, for which Ștefan Sasu adapted fragments from Creangă and Dulfu.

Decades after Păcală în lună, the folk hero became the main protagonist in a live-action film, directed by Geo Saizescu—a project for which he first consulted Arghezi. The first production, issued in 1974 and eponymously titled, was based on a screenplay by Dumitru Radu Popescu and starred Sebastian Papaiani (who came to embody Păcală in the popular mind). The film shows Păcală as a culture hero battling an unseen villain, Stupidity. It had a record-breaking attendance of 20 million, but was panned in a yearly retrospective by critic Florian Potra: "Păcală [...] was perhaps the only attempt at consolidating the rather fragile territory of Romanian film comedy, adopting an unusual formula—that of 'comedic ballad'; the authors gave us a viable Păcală, but one who is not fully expressive for the specific humor that folk genius has bestowed upon him, in the oral tradition." Ábrahám commended Popescu's writing, which had made the story-line "contiguous and vivid, subject to its own laws. He showed a bit of value-saving disrespect for the source material, combined, omitted, condensed, but in such a way that he not only cleared the dust of oblivion from the story that became a film, but also covered a tiny bit of it with the glimmers of skepticism and irony of modern age."

Saizescu, who in 2003 was chairman of a Păcală Humorous Society, released a 2006 sequel, Păcală se întoarce, assigning the title role to Denis Ștefan; Papaiani had a supporting role. The newer project garnered poor reviews, with Iulia Blaga calling its jokes "puerile and inept, when not merely vulgar", managing to be "insulting for both commoners and cinephiles"; Andrei Gorzo described it as humorless, distiguished only for featuring "one of the most grotesque musical acts in the history of Romanian audio-visual media." Five out of the ten critics interviewed by Observator Cultural in December 2006 nominated Păcală se întoarce as the worst Romanian film of the year.
