= Roșu =

Roșu (Romanian, meaning "red") may refer to:

== Places ==
- Roșu, a village in Răducăneni commune, Iași County, Romania
- Roșu, a village in Chiajna commune, Ilfov County, Romania
- Roșu, a village administered by the city of Vatra Dornei, Suceava County, Romania
- Roșu, Cahul, a commune in Cahul district, Moldova

== People with the surname ==
- Alexandru Roșu (born 1987), Romanian weightlifter
- Constantin Roșu (born 1990), Romanian footballer
- Grigore Roșu (born 1971), Romanian computer scientist
- Iulian Roșu (born 1994), Romanian footballer
- Laurențiu Roșu (born 1975), Romanian footballer
- Monica Roșu (born 1987), Romanian gymnast
- Neluț Roșu (born 1993), Romanian footballer
- Pelaghia Roșu (1800–1870), Romanian revolutionary

== See also ==
- Lacul Roșu, a lake in Harghita County, Romania
- Pârâul Roșu (disambiguation)
- Roșia (disambiguation)
- Roșieni (disambiguation)
- Roșiori (disambiguation)
- Roșioara (disambiguation)
