= Youth Without Aging and Life Without Death =

Romanian fairy tale

Youth Without Aging and Life Without Death (Romanian: Tinerețe fără bătrânețe și viață fără de moarte) is a story from Romanian folklore, collected by Petre Ispirescu and introduced in the collection Legende sau basmele românilor. It has been republished in numerous collections of stories, such as in Immortal Stories or in the volume Youth Without Old Age from the Arcade collection, Editura Minerva, 1985.

The fairy tale was told to the writer by his father who lived in the Udricani neighborhood, Bucharest. The tale was first published in 1862, in "The Romanian Peasant". The story contains philosophical ideas about the condition of man in the universe, immortality and the cycle of life. The text superimposes with originality mythological and philosophical concepts.

== Synopsis ==
A king and a queen lived the misfortune of not having children. They had enlisted the help of healers, magicians, and philosophers, but no one could drive away their unhappiness. After a while, they find an uncle who gives them useful cures, warning them that they will have only one son, named Făt-Frumos, but that they will not have him. However, the empress takes the medicine and in a few days her time to give birth comes, but the child, still unborn, begins to cry. The king promises the son empires and an emperor's daughter as a future wife, but in vain. In the end, the emperor promises the child eternal youth and immortality. Then the baby is silent and born. But when he reaches the age of 15, the prince reminds his father to keep his word.

As the emperor cannot fulfill his wish, the prince decides to go out into the world to find eternal youth and immortality. He chooses a horse from the stable, knowing that among them was an enchanted one. On his advice, he prepares thoroughly: he feeds the horse for six weeks with milk-boiled barley, finds his grandfather's clothes and weapons from his youth, and only then does he set out in search of his ideal. The prince's journey begins in the wilderness and is a road to the east, which the hero must travel alone.

The first obstacle he has to pass is the estate of Gheonoaia, a being cursed by her parents, whom the prince defeats and asks her for a document with her blood in order to sanctify the peace. Gheonoaia has three girls like fairies and asks the prince to choose one as his bride, but the hero, having an ideal that he does not want to abandon, he goes on, reaching the estate of Scorpia, Gheonoaia's sister, whom he also defeats. The third test means confronting the wildest beasts in the world, who day and night guard the palace of eternal youth. Helped by one of the fairies who live in the palace, he overcomes this obstacle and fulfills his wish. The much sought after eternal youth is represented by the three fairies, who receive him with joy, and the prince marries one of them. Here life takes place in peace and delight, but there is a dangerous place: the Valley of Lamentation. The one who gets there is homesick. Coincidentally, on a hunting day, the prince enters this space and, overwhelmed by memories, sets off for his parents' house. Centuries have passed in the world left by the hero, cities have risen, and the hero is suddenly aging. Before parting with his guiding horse, the prince makes a surprising promise: "Go healthy, for I hope to return soon."

The prince finds Death crouched waiting in a little box, in the cellar of his parents' castle, now in ruins, and leaves himself reaped as his weak knees are trembling with fear.

== Analysis ==
=== Tale type ===
Romanian scholarship classified the tale, according to the international Aarne-Thompson Index, as type 470C*. However, in the international index, the tale is classified as type AaTh 470*, "The Hero Visits the Land of Immortals". Furthermore, German scholar Hans-Jörg Uther, in his 2004 revision of the international index, subsumed type AaTh 470* under new tale type ATU 470B, "The Land Where No One Dies": the hero reaches the land of immortals or the land where no one dies, and marries its queen; later, he grows homesick and decides to return home, but his wife argues him against it; still, he returns home and discovers his parents' ruined house and a strange man; when the hero climbs down the horse to help the man, the man reveals he is Death.

According to Hungarian scholar Faragó Jószef, the tale is thematically related to other tales where the hero longs for and seeks immortality.

=== Variants ===
Author Frances Browne published a variant of the tale, with the title The Tale of Youth free from Age, and Life free from Death.

== Adaptations ==
The film Youth Without Old Age (1968) is based on this story.

== See also ==
- Guingamor
- Urashima Taro
