= The Boys with the Golden Stars =

Romanian fairy tale

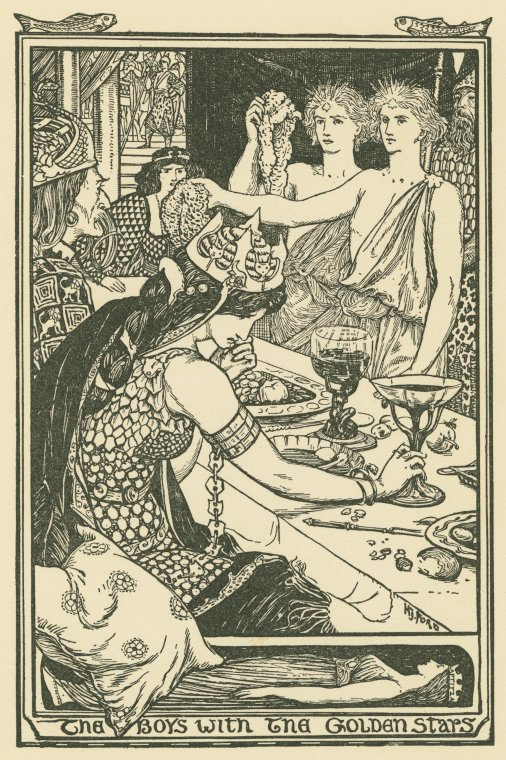
- The boys with the golden stars, by Ford, H. J., in Andrew Lang's The Violet Fairy Book (1901).

Folk tale
- Name: The Boys with the Golden Stars
- Also known as: Doi feți cu stea în frunte The Twins with the Golden Star
- Aarne–Thompson grouping: ATU 707 (The Three Golden Children, or The Three Golden Sons)
- Region: Romania
- Related: A String of Pearls Twined with Golden Flowers

The Boys with the Golden Stars (Romanian: Doi feți cu stea în frunte, lit. 'Two Boys with Stars on Their Foreheads') is a Romanian fairy tale collected in Rumänische Märchen. Andrew Lang included it in The Violet Fairy Book. An alternate title to the tale is The Twins with the Golden Star.

The tale is classified in the international Aarne-Thompson-Uther Index as type ATU 707, "The Three Golden Children", albeit following a specific narrative that is found in Romania, Moldova, and Hungary, as well as in other Eastern European and Balkanic countries. These tales refer to stories where a girl promises a king she will bear a child or children with wonderful attributes, but her jealous relatives or the king's wives plot against the babies and their mother.

== Origins ==
The Romanian tale Doi feți cu stea în frunte was first published in the Romanian magazine Convorbiri Literare, in October, 1874, and signed by Romanian author Ioan Slavici.

== Synopsis ==
A herdsman had three daughters, Ana, Stana and Laptița. The youngest was the most beautiful. One day, the emperor was passing with attendants. The oldest daughter said that if he married her, she would bake him a loaf of bread that would make him young and brave forever; the second one said, if one married her, she would make him a shirt that would protect him in any fight, even with a dragon, and against heat and water; the youngest one said that she would bear him twin sons with stars on their foreheads. The emperor married the youngest, and two of his friends married the other two. (Note: In the original tale, the heroic emperor was called Făt-Voinic and his wife Lăptiţa.)

The emperor's stepmother had wanted him to marry her daughter and so hated his new wife. She got her brother to declare war on him, to get him away from her, and when the empress gave birth in his absence, killed and buried the twins in the corner of the garden and put puppies in their place. The emperor punished his wife to show what happened to those who deceived the emperor.

Two aspens grew from the grave, putting on years' growth in hours. The stepmother wanted to chop them down, but the emperor forbade it. Finally, she convinced him, on the condition that she had beds made from the wood, one for him and one for her. In the night, the beds began to talk to each other. The stepmother had two new beds made, and burned the originals. While they were burning, the two brightest sparks flew off and fell into the river. They became two golden fish. When fishermen caught them, they wanted to take them alive to the emperor. The fish told them to let them swim in dew instead, and then dry them out in the sun. When they did this, the fish turned back into babies, maturing in days.

Wearing lambskin caps that covered their hair and stars, they went to their father's castle and forced their way in. Despite their refusal to take off their caps, the emperor listened to their story, only then removing their caps. The emperor executed his stepmother and took back his wife.

== Analysis ==
=== Tale type ===
The tale is classified in the international Aarne-Thompson-Uther Index as type ATU 707, "The Three Golden Children". Despite being classified as type 707, the narrative differs in its intermediate part: the twin children are buried and go through a cycle of incarnations, from trees (firs, walnut trees, apple trees, etc.), to objects, to animals (lambs, rams or birds) to human children again.

Folklorist Corneliu Barbulescu studied the Romanian variants of tale type 707 and discerned two narratives: one that matches the international tale type (youngest of three sisters gives birth to three children who are cast in water; siblings go on quest for marvellous objects), which only registers 18 variants in Romania, and another with 44 texts, involving twin children being buried and undergoing a cycle of reincarnations. Barbulescu termed the second cycle, unlisted in the international index, as type 707C*, Însiră-te mărgăritar, after a tale published by Petre Ispirescu. In this cycle, the king marries a woman that promises wonder children, but they are buried in the garden; from their graves, two trees with golden leaves or golden fruits sprout which bend down respectfully for the king; the trees are made into beds which talk at night, and are burned; two sparks escape and are eaten by a goat, which gives birth to two golden-fleeced lambs that are killed; its entrails are washed in the river, but wash away and are carried away by the river to a willow tree, where the twins regain human form; they later are found by a shepherd, go to their father's court and tell the whole story.

=== Motifs ===
==== The birth of the wonder-children ====
Most versions of The Boys With Golden Stars begin with the birth of male twins, but very rarely there are fraternal twins, a boy and a girl. When they transform into human babies again, the siblings grow up at an impossibly fast rate and hide their supernatural trait under a hood or a cap. Soon after, they show up in their father's court or house to reveal the truth through a riddle or through a ballad.

The motif of a woman's babies, born with wonderful attributes after she claimed she could bear such children, but stolen from her, is a common fairy tale motif; see "The Dancing Water, the Singing Apple, and the Speaking Bird", "The Tale of Tsar Saltan", "The Three Little Birds", "The Wicked Sisters", "Ancilotto, King of Provino", and "Princess Belle-Etoile". Some of these variants feature an evil stepmother.

==== The reincarnation motif ====
Daiva Vaitkevičienė suggested that the transformation sequence in the tale format (from human babies, to trees, to lambs/goats and finally to humans again) may be underlying a theme of reincarnation, metempsychosis or related to a life-death-rebirth cycle. This motif is shared by other tale types, and does not belong exclusively to the ATU 707.

French scholar Gédeon Huet noted the "striking" (frappantes, in the original) similarities between these versions of ATU 707 and the Ancient Egyptian story of The Tale of Two Brothers - "far too great to be coincidental", as he put it.

India-born author Maive Stokes noted the resurrective motif of the murdered children, and found parallels among European tales published during that time. Austrian consul Johann Georg von Hahn also remarked on a similar transformation sequence present in a Greek tale from Asia Minor, Die Zederzitrone, a variant of The Love for Three Oranges (ATU 408). Bulgarian folklorist Lyubomira Parpulova noted the resemblance between the twins' cycle of reincarnations to the heroine's of Bulgarian tale type ATU 408, "Неродена мома" ("The Maiden Who Was Never Born").

==== Asian parallels ====
A similar occurrence of the tree reincarnation is attested in the Bengali folktale The Seven Brothers who were turned into Champa Trees (Sat Bhai Chompa, first published in 1907) and in the tale The Real Mother, collected in Simla.

In a Thai tale, Champa Si Ton or The Four Princes (Thai: สี่ยอดกุมาร), king Phaya Chulanee, ruler of the City of Panja, is already married to a woman named Queen Akkee. He travels abroad and reaches the deserted ruins of a kingdom (City of Chakkheen). He saves a princess named Pathumma from inside a drum she was hiding in when some terrifying creatures attacked her kingdom, leaving her as the sole survivor. They return to Panja and marry. Queen Pathumma is pregnant with four sons, to the envy of the first wife. She replaces the sons for dogs to humiliate the second queen, and throws the babies in the river. A version of the tale is also preserved in palm-leaf manuscript form. The tale continues as the four princes are rescued from the water and buried in the garden, only to become champa trees and later regaining their human shapes.

In a Laotian version of Champa Si Ton, or The Four Champa Trees, King Maha Suvi is married to two queens, Mahesi and Mahesi Noi. Queen Mahesi gives birth to the four princes, who are taken to the water in a basket. When they are young, they are poisoned by the second queen and buried in the village, four champa trees sprouting on their graves. The second queen learns of their survival and orders the trees to be felled down and thrown in the river. A monk sees their branches with flowers and takes them off the river.

A similar series of transformations is found in "Beauty and Pock Face" and "The Story of Tam and Cam".

In a Burmese tale titled The Big Tortoise, at the end of the tale, after she was replaced by her ugly stepsister, the heroine goes through two physical transformations: the heroine, Mistress Youngest, visits her stepfamily, who drops a cauldron of boiling water over her and she becomes a white paddy-bird. Later, the false bride kills her bird form and asks the cook to roast it. The cook buries the bird's remains behind the kitchen, where a quince tree sprouts. An old couple passes by the quince tree and a large fruit falls on their lap that they take home and put in an earthen jar. The fruit contains the true princess and, when the old couple leaves their cottage, the princess goes out of the earthen jar to tidy up the place.

In a Chinese tale from Fujian, Da Jie (also a Cinderella variant), after Da Jie marries a rich scholar, her stepfamily devises a plan to replace her with Da Jie's smallpox-riddled stepsister, Xia Mei. Xia Mei shoves Da Jie into a well, but she turns into a sparrow, which communicates with her husband to alert him of the substitution. Xia Mei kills the sparrow and buries it in the garden. In that spot a bamboo tree grows, which soothes her husband and annoys the false spouse. Xia Mei decides to have the bamboo tree made into a bed. If the scholar sleeps on it, he feels refreshed; if the stepsister sleeps on it, she feels awful, so she notices it is Da Jie's doing. She orders the bed to be burnt down, but an old woman discovers its charred remains and brings them home. When she goes out and returns at night, she notices someone has prepared her dinner. On the third night, she senses the presence of Da Jie and helps her regain human form and later reunite her with the husband.

==== Other regions ====
A similar transformation sequence occurs in French-Missourian folktale L'Prince Serpent Vert pis La Valeur ("The Prince Green Snake and La Valeur"), collected by Franco-Ontarian scholar Joseph Médard Carrière. After hero La Valeur disenchants Prince Green Snake, he receives a magical shirt and sabre. After being betrayed by his wife, the princess, La Valeur is resurrected into horse form by Prince Green Snake and returns to his wife's kingdom. The wife orders the horse to be killed, but before his death, La Valeur instructs a maid to save his first three droplets of blood. She does so and three laurel trees sprout. The traitorous princess recognizes the trees and orders them to be felled, but the maid rescues three wood chips, which become three ducks. Later, the three ducks fly to the magic shirt, disappear with it and La Valeur regains his human form. (Note: This tale is classified as tale type ATU 318, "The Faithless Wife" or Batamärchen.)

A similar cycle of transformations is attested in a Sicilian tale collected by folklorist Giuseppe Pitré from Montevago. In this tale (another variant of the tale type ATU 707), La cammisa di lu gran jucaturi e l'auceddu parlanti ("The Shirt of the Great Player and the Talking Bird"), the prince marries a poor maiden against his mother's wishes. She gives birth to 12 boys and a girl, which the queen buries in the garden. However, 12 orange trees and a lemon tree sprout in their place. A goatherder passes by the garden and one of his goats eats some of the leaves. It gives birth to the 13 siblings, who grow up and later seek three treasures.

===== Greece =====
According to the Greek folktale catalogue of Angelopoulou and Brouskou, some Greek variants of type 707 contain the motif of the wonder-children and the rebirth as plants, animals and humans again. In one variant from Roccaforte del Greco, in Calabria, the third sister promises to give birth to 100 sons with a golden apple in the hand and a daughter with a golden star. They are buried, turn into 101 oranges trees, which are burned down. In their ashes, 100 grains of pepper and an aubergine that are eaten by a goat.

In a tale from Arminou-Néa Pafos, La tisseuse, the mother promises to give birth to 101 children. They are buried and on their graves sprout 100 cypresses and one platanus tree. Their flowers are eaten by a goat and they return to human form.

In a variant from Asia Minor, the tale begins with type ATU 510A, "Cinderella". The story continues as the princess gives birth to three sons of gold. They are buried and become trees. The villain orders the trees to be burnt down, but some sparks are eaten by a goat, which gives birth to the three sons anew. The Sun and its mother pass by the boys to provide them with clothes and gifts.

In the tale Ό Ήλιος, ό Αύγερινός καί ή Πούλια (The Sun, the Morning-Star and the Pleiad), the older sister tells her sisters she dreamt she married the king and gave birth to "three beautiful children": Sun, Morning Star and Pleiad. The king overhears their conversation and marries the older sister. When they are born, "the room shone from their beauty". The midwife replaces them for puppies and buries them in the basement of the castle. The king calls for his children, and they answer him. He decides to erect a new palace, but the midwife takes the children's bones and buries them in the yard. Three cypress trees sprout. The midwife orders the trees to be felled down. Three flowers sprout and the queen sends her pet goat to eat them. The goat gets pregnant and the queen wants it killed. After her order is carried out, a slave girl washes its entrails in the river and the children reappear in human form.

== Distribution ==
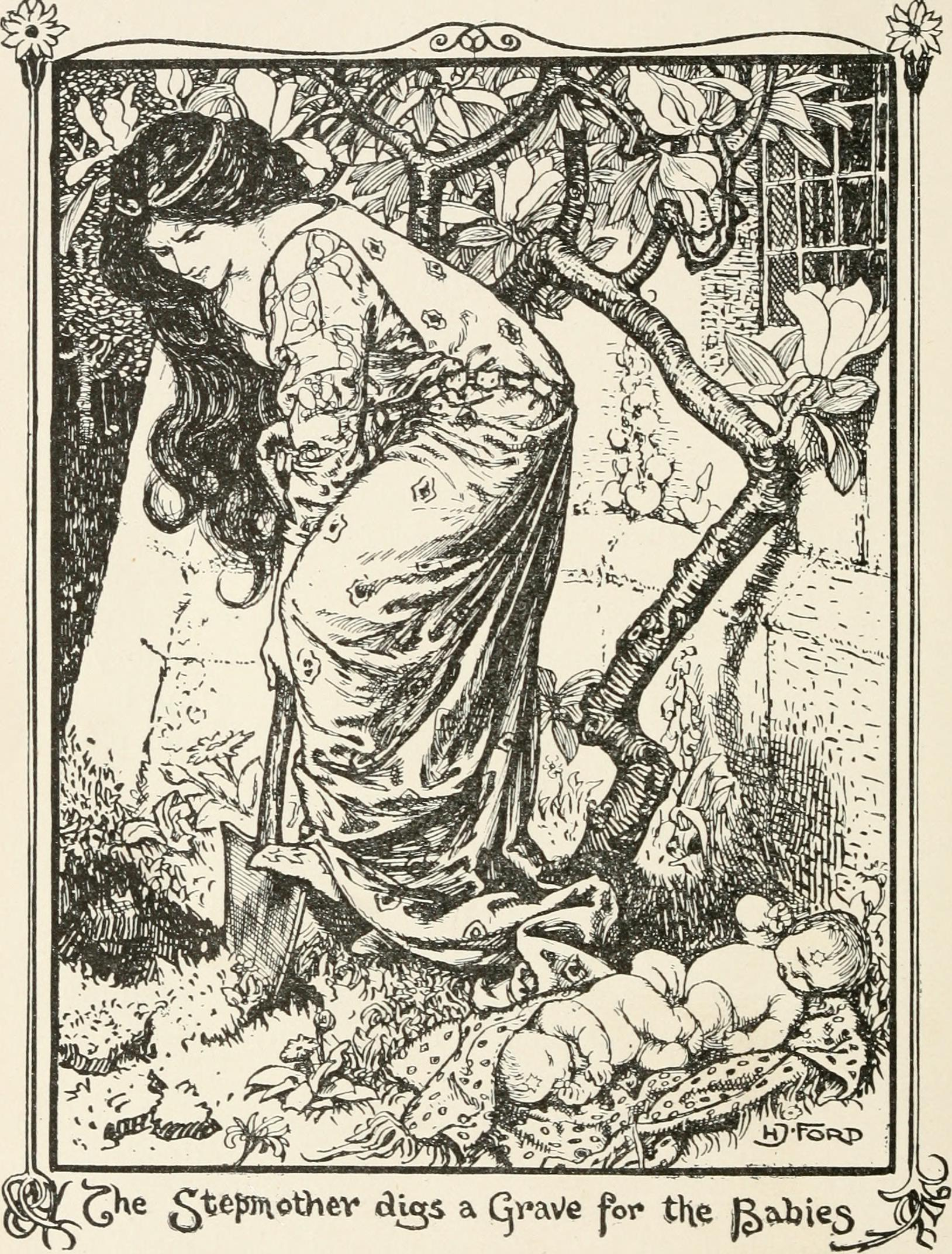
The stepmother digs up a grave in the garden to bury the young princes. Illustration by Henry Justice Ford for Andrew Lang's The Violet Fairy Book (1901).

Analysing some of the available variants of tale type 707 during his lifetime, Romanian folklorist Lazar Saineanu suggested that the killing of the twin children and their rebirth in a cycle of metamorphoses seemed "typical" to Eastern Europe: in Romania; Belarus; in Serbia; in the Bukovina region; in Croatia; Bosnia, Moldavia, Bulgaria, Poland, Ukraine, Czech Republic, Slovakia, and among the Transylvanian Saxons.

Hungarian scholar Ágnes Kovács stated that this was the "Eastern European subtype" of the tale Cei doi fraţi cu păr de aur ("The Twin Brothers With Golden Hair"), found "all across the Romanian language territories", as well in Hungarian speaking regions. In addition, Ákos Dömötor, in the 1988 revised edition of Hungarian Folktale Catalogue, noted its presence across the countries bordering Hungary and in Southeastern Europe.

Similarly, professor Jack V. Haney, in the commentaries to one Slavic variant, noted that the twins' cycle of transformations (from humans, to trees, to lambs and humans again) appears in tales from Belarus, Ukraine, Poland, Czech Republic and Slovakia. In this regard, according to Russian folklorist Lev Barag and Belarusian scholarship, the twins' cycle of reincarnations appears in "some" variants from Belarus and Ukraine, as well as in West Slavic texts.

Professor Reginetta Haboucha remarked that the reincarnation cycle of these variants (human - tree - sheep - human) constitutes a new type she identified as **707B, "Truth Comes to Light" - a combination between type 707 and "essential elements" from type AT 780A, "The Cannibalistic Brothers".

=== Development ===
Corneliu Barbulescu studied the Romanian variants of tale type 707C* and argued for the antiquity of this narrative. He also suggested that the narrative circulated in crystallized form "where it was created" (namely, Romania), and that subsequent tellings were "tributaries" of the Romanian texts. This position was criticized by ethnologue Ovidiu Bïrlea, who reported a larger area of attestation of these tales, like in Serbo-Croatian (5 tales), Bulgarian, Slovak, Belarusian (5 texts), and Latvian and Russian (1 text in each).

Russian scholar T. V. Zueva names this format "Reincarnation of the Luminous Twins" and considers this group of variants as "an ancient Slavic plot", since these tales have been collected from Slavic-speaking areas. Another argument she raises is that the tree transformation in most variants is the sycamore, a tree with mythical properties in East Slavic folklore. She also argues that this format is the "archaic version" of the tale type, since it shows the motif of the tree and animal transformation, and recalls ancient ideas of twin beings in folklore.

=== Variants ===
==== Romania ====
According to Corneliu Barbulescu, this subtype appears across the Romanian territory with "remarkable unity, vigour and purity", with one Aromanian text, ten texts from Muntenia, 11 from Moldavia and 23 from Transylvania. Writer and folklorist Cristea Sandu Timoc considered that these tales were typically Romanian, and belonged to tale type AaTh 707C*. He also reported that "more than 70 variants" of this subtype were "known" (as of 1988).

===== Regional tales =====
Arthur Carl Victor Schott and Albert Schott collected a Romanian tale from Banat, from an informant named Mihaila Poppowitsch. In this story, titled Die goldenen kinder ("The Golden Children"), a man is about to marry his intended, when a woman passes by him and announces she will give him golden children. The man takes the second woman and his wife, and his previous bride asks to be taken as a maid to their house. When the woman is pregnant and gives birth to the golden boys, the evil maid murders the children and buries them in the garden, then places a dog near the woman. The man falls for the ruse, exiles his wife and takes the maid as his new wife. As for the children, two apple trees yielding golden apples sprout from their hearts in their graves, which alerts the evil woman of her murder, so she wants the trees felled down and made into trees. It happens thus, but the beds keep talking at night to each other, so they are burnt to cinders. However, an ewe that belongs to the man eats a golden apple and foals two golden fleeced lambs, which the evil woman wants killed and its entrails washed in the river by another maid. One strip of the entrails washes away in another margin and out comes the two golden boys, who grow up in days. The Sun, on its daily journey, sees the children's beauty. They conceal themselves in raggedy clothes and find their mother, who they also hide under beggar's clothes. The boys and their mother return to their father's house and beg for shelter, which is granted in the name of hospitality. Some time later, the man gathers people to work in the fields and bids them tell stories to entertain the others. When it is the twins' turn, they recount their family's history, despite the evil woman's interruptions, and omit their names. Their father listens to the boys' tale and realizes they are his children, who remove their beggar disguises. The man reunites with his wife and asks for her forgiveness, then exiles the evil maid for her crimes. According to Romanian scholarship, the tale published by the Schott brothers is the oldest variant of the narrative recorded in Romania.

Romanian folklorist Atanasie Marian Marienescu published a tale in newspaper Albina (ro) with the title Doi feti cotofeti ("Two Children with Golden Hair"). In this tale, an emperor passes by three sisters working in the fields, who are talking among themselves: the elder boasts she could fill the emperor's house with pane, the middle one that she can fill it with pandia, and the youngest promises to bear him two beautiful children with golden hair. The emperor overhears their conversation and takes the youngest as his wife. When it is time for the twins' delivery, she gives birth to them, but the children are taken and buried in the garden. Two firs sprout on their graves, who make shade for the emperor when he passes by them. The twins go through a cycle of reincarnations (from trees, to lambs, to humans again), and later go to emperor's court.

In a Romanian tale translated into Hungarian language as A két aranyhajú gyermek ("The Two Children With Golden Hair"), the youngest sister promises the king to give birth to a boy and a girl of unparalleled beauty. Her sisters, seething with envy, conspire with the king's gypsy servant, take the children and bury them in the garden. After the twins are reborn as trees, they twist their branches to make shade for the king when he passes, and to hit their aunts when they pass. After they go through the rebirth cycle, the Sun, stunned at their beauty, clothes them and gives the boy a flute.

In a variant from Siebenburgen by author Franz Obert with the title Die Schnitterin als Kaiserin ("The Harvester as Queen"), the maiden is made queen on the promise of bearing golden-haired twins. A "gypsy" who worked at the king's court, jealous of the newly-crowned queen, exchanges her children for two puppies and buries the babies in the garden. From their burial place, two Tännenbaum (fir trees) sprout.

Writer and folklorist Cristea Sandu Timoc collected two other Romanian variants, published in 1988. In one, Doi feţi logofeţi, collected from Ţăranu Dumitru, the third sister promises to give birth to twins as beautiful as gold and silver. In the second, Trei fete mari in cînepă, collected from Sandru Gherghina, the third sister promises twins of gold and silver. In both tales, the twins, a boy and a girl, go through the cycle of transformations (trees, animals, humans again).

Ion Pop-Reteganul collected the tale Cei doi copii cu părul de aur (Two Children with Golden Hair).

==== Moldavia ====
In a Moldovan tale published by author and folklorist Grigore Botezatu with the Romanian Cyrillic title "Дой фець логофець ку пэрул де аур" (Transcription: Doi feţi logofeţi cu părul de aur; English: "Two Children with Hair of Gold"), the youngest maiden promises to give birth to twin children with golden hair. A witch takes the newborn royals and tries to kill them by putting them under the hooves of animals to be trampled. She fails, so she resorts to burying both under the threshold. The boys become walnut trees, then lambs, then ducks, then regain human form.

==== Hungary ====
Hungarian scholarship classifies the ATU 707 tale under the banner of "The Golden-Haired Twins" (Hungarian: Az aranyhajú ikrek). In addition, the Hungarian Folktale Catalogue (MNK) indexes it as its own Hungarian type, under classification MNK 707*, Az aranyhajú két testvér ("The Two Golden-Haired Brothers"), with 13 variants, four of them combined with other types. In this Hungarian type, after the king marries the sister that promises the wonder-children, a rival woman takes the twins and buries them; on their grave, talking trees sprout, and the twins go through a cycle of transformations.

In the tale A mostoha királyfiakat gyilkoltat, the step-parent asks for the organs of the twin children to eat. They are killed, their bodies are buried in the garden and from their grave two apple trees sprout.

In the tale A mosolygó alma ("The Smiling Apple"), a king sends his page to pluck some fragrant scented apples in a distant garden. When the page arrives at the garden, a dishevelled old man appears and takes him into his house, where the old man's three young daughters live. The daughters comment among themselves their marriage wishes: the third wishes to marry the king and give him two golden-haired children, one with a "comet star" on the forehead and another with a sun. The rest of the story follows The Boys with the Golden Star format.

In a Csángo tale titled A két aranyhajú gyermek, translated to German as Die zwei goldhaarigen Kinder (English: "The Two Children with Golden Hair"), a boy drinks from a puddle and becomes a deer, and his sister is found by the king during a hunt. The sister, in this variant, begs the king to take her, for she will bear him twin sons with golden hair. After the twin boys are born, they are buried in the ground and go through a cycle of transformations, from golden-leaved trees, to lambs to humans again. When they assume human form, the Moon, the Sun and the Wind give them clothes and shoes.

==== South Slavic ====
===== Serbia =====
In a Serbian variant published by author Elodie Lawton with the title The Golden-Haired Twins, a king is looking for a wife. In his wanderings, he overhears the conversation between three maidens: the first promises to bear the king a son who would be the greatest hero in the world; the second promises to bear two golden-haired male twins; and the third promises to bear him a beautiful daughter. The king chooses the second maiden and they marry. While the king is away a war, the king's stepmother takes the twins as soon as they are born and buries them in the garden, and places two puppies in their place. The queen is imprisoned beneath the castle and two trees with golden leaves and golden blossoms sprout in the garden. The king's stepmother realizes the trees are related to the twins and orders them to be chopped down and made into boards for a new bed. She cannot sleep in her new bed, for the twins converse to each other all night, so she orders the bed to be burned. Two sparks fly out of the pyre and turn into golden lambs. The king's stepmother orders the lambs to be killed. While their fleece is washed in the river, the fleeces float downstream. A fisherman then finds a box with the golden-haired twins and raises them. Years later, when they are grown up, they ask their foster father to dress in beggar's clothes to hide their golden hair. They make a living by playing a goussle and a cymbal and singing songs. One day, they go their father's castle and sing a song to the whole court, then take off their caps to reveal their golden hair.

In an article in the Archiv für slavische Philologie, scholars Vatroslav Jagić and Reinhold Köhler reported a Serbian tale published in magazine Српски летопис. In this tale, titled "Двоје златие деце" and translated as Zwei goldene Kinder ("Two Golden Children"), the king finds three women harvesting the fields; they stop to rest and the youngest promises to bear the king two golden children. She marries the king and gives birth to two golden male twins. A wicked servant buries them in the garden. The twins go through a cycle of transformations (from golden spruce trees, to doves, to lambs, to humans again).

===== Croatia =====
In a Croatian variant collected by linguist Rudolf Strohal with the title O grofu i njegovoj zloj materi ("About the count and his evil mother"), a count passes by a window where three girls are talking: the first one wants to marry the count's coachman, the second one the count's cook and the third the count himself. The count brings them to his house the next day and weds them to their respective partners. One day, he has to go to war, and leaves his pregnant wife in his mother's care. While the man is away, his wife gives birth to golden-haired twins, whom the count's mother takes and buries in the garden. On their grave two linden trees sprout. The count's mother orders the trees to be felled and to make a bed for her. The bedposts talk to each other and does not let their grandmother sleep, so she orders the bed to be burnt down. Two sparks fly out of the pyre and are swallowed by a sheep, which foals two golden lambs after a while. The count's mother feigns illness and wants the lambs slaughtered as remedy for her, and their innards to be washed in the river. Her orders are carried out, but a raven steals the innards. Some time later, the golden-haired twins regain human form and meet their father. Linguist Erich Karl Berneker translated the tale into German as Vom Grafen und seiner bösen Mütter and sourced it from the Kajkavian dialect.

===== Bulgaria =====
The Bulgarian Folktale Catalogue, published by scholar Liliana Daskalova, registers a similar narrative as a regional subtype of type 707, indexed as *707D, "Деца със златни коси и сребърни зъби", or "Kinder mit goldenen Haaren und silbernen Zähnen" ("Children with Golden Hair and Silver Teeth"). In this subtype, the third sister promises to bear children with wonderful attributes, who are taken from her as soon as they are born and buried in the garden. On the children's graves sprout two trees with golden leaves and golden fruits. The twins then continue to pass through a cycle of reincarnations (from trees to lambs and lastly to humans again).

In a Bulgarian variant, "Дети воеводы" ("The Voivode's Children"), three sisters of marriageable age, while spinning under the moonlight near the mill, comment among themselves what they can do if they marry the voivode's son. The youngest answers she will bear him twin boys with golden hair and silver teeth. The voivode's son marries the youngest and becomes voivode. When the times comes, the queen's sisters insist they be brought to the palace to help in labor. The eldest sister, envious of her fortune and marriage, takes both boys as soon as they are born, kills them, buries them in the garden, while putting two puppies in their place to further humiliate the queen. The voivode banishes her to a hut near a lake and marries her elder sister. Two trees with silver leaves and golden flowers sprout on the children's graves. When taking a stroll in the garden, both trees lean forward to caress the father with their leaves and to hit his new wife with their branches. The voivode's new wife cuts down the trees and burns them. Their ashes are gathered by the former wife and spread through the garden, where two cornflowers with golden stamens and silver petals grow and are eaten by a sheep. The sheep gives birth to two lambs with golden horns and silver wool. They are put in a basket and washed downstream to their mother's hut. She suckles both lambs and they regain human form. After a while, the voivode and his new wife visit the former queen in her hut and see the twin boys. The voivode returns to the palace, questions the cat, which reveals the whole truth. He punishes the new wife and restores his first wife.

==== East Slavic ====
===== Belarus =====
In a Belarusian tale, "Блізняткі" (The Twins), an evil witch kills two boys - the sons of the prince. On their grave two sycamores grow. The witch realizes it is the boys and orders the gardener to fell them down. A sheep licks the ashes and soon enough gives birth to two sheep - the very same princes. Later, they regain their human form and tell the king the whole story.

In another tale, "ЧУДЕСНЫЕ МАЛЬЧИКИ" (Chudetsnye Malchiki; English: "Wonderful/Miraculous Boys"), first collected by Alexander Afanasyev in Grodno, in 1857, the youngest sister states she will give birth to "two boys, each with a moon on his head and a star on the nape of his neck". When they are buried, on their grave two maples sprout (or, in another translation, "two plane-trees"), a golden stem and a silver one (or "one with golden, the other with silver branches"). The tale was also published by A. H. Wratislaw with the name "The Wonderful Boys", or "The Wondrous Lads", and by Czech folklorist Karel Jaromír Erben with the name Podivní chlapci ("The Wonderful Boys").

==== Slovakia ====
Czech scholar Jiri Polivka identified a Slovak tale of the Boys With the Golden Stars format, which he then named Pani s chlapci zakopaná do hnojiska. Slncová matka im pomáha ("Maiden and sons buried in manure; the Sun's Mother helps them"). In this tale, titled O jednom zlatom orechu ("About a golden nut"), a wife gives birth to twins while her husband is at war. A witch sews the boys in an oxen hide and buries it in a pit of manure. Out of the pit springs a nut tree. The witch orders the trees to be made into beds; later, when she hears he twins' voices coming from the beds, she orders the beds to be burnt to cinders. Sparks fly out of the beds' pyre and reach a rose bush, which is eaten by a goat. Some time later, the she-goat gives birth to two kids. The animals are killed and the twins regain human form. The Sun, on his daily journey, sees the twins and, impressed by their beauty, tells his mother. The Sun's mother comes to them with clothes and a golden apple.

==== Ireland ====
On the other hand, according to researcher Maxim Fomin, Irish folklorist Seán Ó Súilleabháin identified this as a second ecotype (oikotype) of type ATU 707 in Ireland, which he titled "Irish ecotype B". In this subtype, the children are born with stars and a golden necklace, are buried by orders of their aunt, and go through a cycle of reincarnations from plant to animal to humans again, until they return to their father's court to tell their story.

==== Baltic Region ====
===== Lithuania =====
Similarly, Lithuanian scholarship (namely, Bronislava Kerbelytė and Daiva Vaitkevičienė) lists at least 23 variants of this format in Lithuania. In these variants, the youngest sister promises to give birth to twins with the sun on the forehead, the moon on the neck and stars on the temples. A boy and a girl are born, but they are buried by a witch, and on their graves an apple tree and a pear tree sprout. They mostly follow the cycle of transformations (from human babies, to trees, to animals and finally to humans again), but some differ in that after they become lambs, they are killed and their ashes are eaten by a duck that hatches two eggs. Kerbelyte locates most of the Lithuanian variants of this format in the Dzūkija region.

===== Latvia =====
According to the Latvian Folktale Catalogue, tale type 707, "The Three Golden Children", is known in Latvia as Brīnuma bērni ("Wonderful Children"), comprising 4 different redactions. Its third redaction follows The Boys with the Golden Stars: the twins are buried by their stepmother in the garden and go through a cycle of transformations (from babies, to trees, to burnt trees, to lambs, to humans again).

==== Balkans ====
===== Albania =====
Slavicist André Mazon, in his study on Balkan folklore, published an Albanian language variant he titled Les Trois Soeurs. In this tale, a king forbids lighting any light at night the next evening. However, three poor sisters do not follow the ban and keep working through the night. Then they talk among themselves about their wishes to marry the king: the elder promises to dress the entire army with a single roll of cloth; the middle one that she can feed the army with a single batch of bread, and the third sister promises to give birth to a boy with a moon on his breast and a girl with a star on the front. The king's son overhears their conversation, then marries the first sister. She fails in clothing the army, and is made a servant. The king's son marries the second sister and she also does not fulfill her boast, so she is also made a servant. He marries the third sister and has to go to war. While he is away, his wife gives birth to her promised twins, but the sisters take the babies and bury them in the garden. After the king's son returns, the queen is made to be a goose herd. On the children's graves, two cypress trees sprout and incline whenever their parents pass by. Their aunts notice the trees are the children and order them to be felled and planks made from them. This does not stop them, so the aunts order the planks to be burned. On the place they were burned, a palace appears and the twins are reborn as humans. During a hunt, the king discovers the palace and visits the twins.

Folklorist Maximilian Lambertz published an Albanian tale titled Stern auf der Stirn und Stern auf der Brust ("A Star on the Front and a Star on the Breast"), first collected in Korça. In this tale, three sisters talk about their marriage wishes to the king's son: the elder boasts she can bake a single batch of bread to feed the whole army; the middle one that she can clothe the whole army with a single bale of fabric; and the youngest promises to bear him a son with a star on the front and a girl with a star on the breast. A king's son is passing near their window and overhears their conversation, then sends for the sisters the following morning: he promises to marry the first sister if she proves her claim, but she cannot, so he dismisses her and takes the middle one. The second sister also cannot prove her claims and is also dismissed. Finally, he sends for the third sister, who, after nine months, gives birth to her promised twins with star birthmarks. However, the elder sisters, jealous of their cadette, take their twin nephews and hide elsewhere, replacing them for a pair of kittens. The prince goes to see his newborns and finds the animals, and the sisters lie that their cadette was a cat. For this, the prince banishes his wife to be a gooseherd. As for the children, they are buried in the ground; from their graves, twin bushes sprout that stay still when either the prince or their mother pass them by, but tear apart their aunts' clothes and scratch their faces whenever the duo pass near them. The sisters listen to the children's conversation beneath the earth, who say they are soft when their parents pass by, but hard when their aunts walk by. The jealous aunts then take the bushes and burn them, but a pair of sparks fly away and land in the mountain, creating a large castle. Some time later, the prince, on a hunt, finds the newly built castle and demands entry. The castle doors, which can talk, ask their mistress, the female twin, if they can let the stranger in if they are a good man and lock him outside if they are not. The doors say he is a good man and let him in. The prince is welcomed in the castle, where everything can talk, and meets a boy with a star on the front. They have a meal together while the boy's female twin sings about how they were born, how their aunts tried to kill them but their Ora protected them, and how they created the castle. The prince listens to the song and realizes the twins are his children, then embraces them. He takes his children on white horses, restores his wife to his side and the family reunites at the castle, to the people's joy. The prince then orders for his sisters-in-law to be drawn and quartered as their punishment.

==== Greece ====
According to Greek scholar Anna Angelopoulous, fourteen Greek texts contain the twins going under a cycle of transformations: from trees, to beds, to firesparks, to humans again.

==== Judeo-Spanish people ====
In a Judeo-Spanish tale collected in the Balkanic region and translated to French with the title Les enfants d'or ("The Golden Children"), the heroine promises to give birth to twins, one with the sun and the other with the moon on the front. However, a gypsy woman that lives in court and advises the emperor throws the twins in a well. From their grave sprout two trees that the gypsy woman wants to be made into beds. The beds begin to talk to each other at night and disturb the woman's sleep, so she wants them burnt down. Two sparks remain and turn into two lambs. The gypsy woman orders the lambs to be killed and their entrails to be washed in the river. Through the entrails, the twins are reborn as naked humans. The Sun and the Moon pass by the sky and sight the twins, to whom they give clothes to cover their nudity, in admiration of their beauty. At night, the twins go to the emperor's court and are bid to tell a story. The twins narrate their story and reveal the whole truth.

== Adaptations ==
A Hungarian variant of the tale was adapted into an episode of the Hungarian television series Magyar népmesék ("Hungarian Folk Tales") (hu), with the title A két aranyhajú fiú ("The Two Sons With Golden Hair").
