= Osica =

Osica may refer to:

- Osica de Jos, a commune in Olt County, Romania
- Osica de Sus, a commune in Olt County, Romania
- Osica (drone), a type of military drone
