= Petriș (river) =

Petriș Petres-patak
- Location within Romania

Location
- Country: Romania
- Counties: Arad County
- Villages: Corbeşti, Petriș, Seliște

Physical characteristics
- Mouth: Mureș
  - location: Seliște
  - coordinates: 46.0092°N 22.3968°E
- Length: 14 km (8.7 mi)
- Basin size: 111 km^{2} (43 sq mi)

Basin features
- Progression: Mureș→ Tisza→ Danube→ Black Sea
- Tributaries
  - left: Valea Roșie

The Petriș (Hungarian: Petres-patak) is a right tributary of the river Mureș in Romania. It discharges into the Mureș in Seliște. Its length is 14 km (8.7 mi) and its basin size is 111 km^{2} (43 sq mi).
