= Pârâul Roșu (Olteț) =

- Location within Romania

Location
- Country: Romania
- Counties: Olt County
- Villages: Roșienii Mici, Roșienii Mari

Physical characteristics
- Mouth: Olteț
  - location: Osica de Jos
  - coordinates: 44°15′14″N 24°16′40″E
  - elevation: 96 m (315 ft)
- Length: 12 km (7.5 mi)
- Basin size: 31 km^{2} (12 sq mi)

Basin features
- Progression: Olteț→ Olt→ Danube→ Black Sea
- Tributaries
  - right: Valea Fagului
- River code: VIII.1.173.14a

The Pârâul Roșu is a right tributary of the river Olteț in Romania. It flows into the Olteț in Osica de Jos. Its length is 12 km (7.5 mi) and its basin size is 31 km^{2} (12 sq mi).
