= Roșioara =

Roşioara may refer to several villages in Romania:

- Roşioara, a village in the town of Berbești, Vâlcea County
- Roşioara, a village in Mera, Vrancea County

== See also ==
- Roșu (disambiguation)
- Roșia (disambiguation)
- Roșieni (disambiguation)
- Roșiori (disambiguation)
