= Greuceanu =

Heroic character in Romanian folklore

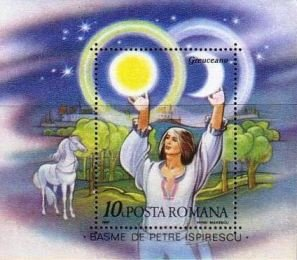
Greuceanu

Greuceanu is a hero of the Romanian folklore. It is a brave young man who finds that the Sun and the Moon have been stolen by zmeu (a serpent/dragon from Romanian folklore). After a long fight with the three zmei and their wives (zmeoaice), Greuceanu sets the Sun and the Moon free so the people on Earth have light again.

"Greuceanu" is also the title of a fairy tale collected by Petre Ispirescu in Legende sau basmele românilor.

== Summary ==
In the kingdom of the Red Emperor ("împăratului Roșu"), an ogre has stolen the sun and the moon from the sky, and the Red Emperor promises to give his daughter's hand in marriage and half of his kingdom to anyone brave enough to get them back. A youth named Greuceanu decides to take up on the offer. On his way to the castle, he meets two deserters who are to be beheaded on the king's orders, but Greuceanu thinks he may dissuade the king of his decision and offer them a pardon. The emperor agrees.

Greuceanu takes his brother and visits Faur, the "world's greatest smith" and his sworn brother ("Faurul pământului", in the original). Greuceanu and Faur work together to fashion an iron replica of him. Afterwards, Greuceanu and his brother go to a crossroads and each depart, giving each other a token of life (a kerchief) to signal that one has perished.

Greuceanu reaches the house of the ogre and his family, and turns himself into a dove, perching in a nearby tree. One of the ogresses sees the dove and considers it a bad omen for them. Greuceanu takes the form of a fly, enters the house and spies on their plans. Armed with this new knowledge, he departs to the bridge to the Green Forest, where the ogres will pass, one at evening, another at midnight and the third at dawn.

Time passes, and the ogres (the ogre father and his two sons-in-law) begin to reach the bridge on their horses, just as they have planned. However, each of the ogres' horses alert its rider of Greuceanu's presence. The hero appears and wrestles the three ogres. The last one, the father-ogre, is the fiercest of them all, which Greuceanu has trouble defeating at first. A raven flies over the battle, to whom Greuceanu bids bring him some water to drink, and the raven will gain three ogre corpses to devour.

Greuceanu wins and restores the Sun and the Moon. He returns to the crossroads and meets his brother. They embrace and go home. On the way, they notice a pear tree, and a cold spring of fresh water near a garden. Greuceanu stops his brother from picking up any pear and drinking the water, for they are the ogre's two daughters, disguised as natural things. The hero strikes the pear tree and the stem of a flower in the garden, killing the two ogresses.

Now back on the road, Greuceanu and his brother look behind them and see the mother ogress coming at them like a cloud of smoke. The duo reaches Faur's workshop to put their plan in action: the ogress demands to talk with Greuceanu. Faur and the hero give her the iron likeness to devour, filled with hot coals. The ogress bursts and dies. The trio celebrate their victory.

Greuceanu rides alone to the Red Emperor's kingdom to gain his reward, and meets a lame devil on the road. The lame devil steals Greuceanu's sword, a scimitar (the source of the hero's power), and delivers it to the Emperor's councillor, who has struck a bargain with the devil to take the credit for Greuceanu's job and marry the princess.

== Analysis ==
=== Classification ===
The tale of Greuceanu can be classified in the Aarne-Thompson-Uther Index as tale type 328A*, "Three Brothers Steal Back the Sun, Moon and Star". The tale also contains type 300A, "Fight on the Bridge", wherein the hero fights three dragons on bridges. Romanian scholarship also classifies the tale as types ATU 300A and 328A*, with the last episode falling under type ATU 302B, "(Hero with) Life Dependent on a Sword".

=== The narrative ===
Hungarian scholar Ágnes Kóvacs recognized some mythical components in the story: the theft of the celestial bodies; the confrontation between heroes and the serpents (dragons, etc.); the revenge of the dragons' wives; the presence of the "World Blacksmith" as the final helper.

According to scholar Linda Dégh, the hero in Hungarian variants can be characterized as a táltos, someone imbued with great power and knowledge, and the blacksmith figure is sometimes described as a smith of God or smith of the world.

=== Parallels ===
Similar stories about the theft of celestial bodies and their recovery by a human hero are attested in nearby regions. According to Hungarian scholarship (namely, János Berze Nagy and Ágnes Kovács), versions are attested in Romania, Serbia, the Czech Republic, Slovakia, Russia, Lithuania, Estonia, as well as some Asian/Siberian variants.

Ágnes Kovács also named this type Szépmezőszárnya ("Beautiful Wing-Field"), with similar tales in Romanian, Czech, Slovak, Ruthenia, Russia, Vogul, Chuvash, Tatar, Lithuanian, Latvian, Estonian, Caucasian and South Siberian. German scholar Kurt Ranke is reported to have collected one from East Prussia and another from Schleswig-Holstein.

Hungarian-American scholar Linda Dégh also reported that "parallels" were found in Romania, and stories with its "elements" were located among "the Russians, the Ural-Altaic Turks, and to [the Hungarians'] kindred nations of North Asia".

Russian folklorist Lev Barag claimed that East Slavic tale type SUS 300A, "Battle on the Bridge" (see below), is "frequent" in East Slavic tales, but located variants in the Czech Republic, Slovakia and Livonia. In addition, according to Barag, in an article in the Enzyklopädie des Märchens, type AaTh 300A* becomes "contaminated" with the release of the celestial lights from devils in Romania, Hungary, Slovakia, Czechia, Latvia, Belarus and Ukraine, as well as among the Chuvash and the Mari.

==== Romania ====
Romanian historian Andrei Oișteanu terms this narrative Furarea astrelor or Stealing of the Stars.

===== In tales =====
In a Muntenian variant collected by Petre Ispirescu with the title Voiniculŭ de plumbă, the Red Emperor's three daughters are kidnapped, and the Sun, the Moon and the Stars also vanish. In the same kingdom, an old man has three sons, the youngest so lazy he spends his days behind the oven, earning his name of "Voiniculŭ de plumbă". He offers to get the princesses back and goes to the Red Emperor to get provisions. He also commissions a large metal mace. Voiniculŭ de plumbă takes his brothers and begins his quest: he passes by a bridge of copper, a bridge of silver and a bridge of gold, and defeats the zmeis there. Later, he turns into a dove and invades the compound of the zmeis' wives and their mother. Still inside the zmeis' house, Voiniculŭ de plumbă breaks open 12 iron locks, and releases the luminaries and the princesses. Voiniculŭ de plumbă convenes with his brothers, and the group makes his way back to the Red Emperor's kingdom, but find on the way a fountain, a rose in bloom and a pear tree with fruits, which are the zmeis' wives in disguise. Voiniculŭ de plumbă strikes them all dead. Then, the zmeis' mother goes after Voiniculŭ de plumbă; he goes to Moşă Călugără, drops a mace into her mouth and kills her. Later, Voiniculŭ de plumbă goes on a quest or Ileana Cosinziana, mistress of the flowers.

In another Romanian variant, Aripă-Frumoasă ("Wing-Beautiful"), three brothers are born on the same day, one in the evening (thus named Evening); another at midnight (thus named Midnight), and lastly the third in the morning (being called Break-of-Day). In this story, their mother reveals to them the king's quest to reclaim the sun, the moon and the star from the hands of the ogres. As they go on their quest, they meet an ogre on a copper horse on the copper bridge; another on a silver horse on the silver bridge, and the third on a gold horse on the golden bridge.

In a tale from Bukovina published by Sbiera with the title Mintă-Creață, Busuioc şi Sucnă-Murgă, the three heroes, named Mintă-Creață, Busuioc and Sucnă-Murgă, find the day star and Saint Peter's Keys to the Kingdom of Heaven, after defeating the villains.

In a Transilvanian tale published by Tuducescu with the title Aripa câmpului ("Field Wing"), in a certain empire, the emperor witnesses the theft of the Sun, the Moon and the Stars by the zmeis, and offers half of the kingdom and his daughter to anyone brave enough to take them back. Many go, but never return, until one day, Field Wing, the youngest of three brothers, asks for provisions for the quest. Field Wing passes by three forests, the first of silver, the second of gold and the third of diamond, and defeats a zmei in each one, gaining back the Sun, the Moon and the stars. In another meadow, three maidens (the zmeis' wives) and an ugly woman are bathing and commenting about the loss of their relatives. Field Wind turns into a mist and enters into the zmeis' wives' house and eavesdrops on their conversation: the wives will turn into a feather, an apple tree and a fountain to trick Field Wing. Discovering the deception, the hero strikes down each one. Lastly, the ugly old woman is drawn to the forge and killed there. The tale then segues into tale type ATU 513A, "How Six Made Their Way into the World", where Field Wing gathers a group of powerful individuals to look for a princess.

Other Romanian variants are Drăgan-Cenușă and Cu Odolean – fičioru Boldicuțî.

===== In colinde =====
Scholarship locates a very similar tale to Greuceanu in Romanian colinde (Christmas carols). In some of them, Judas is the one to steal the stars, the Sun and the Moon from the skies, and Saint John, Saint Elijah and Saint Peter are the ones to restore them.

==== Moldova ====
In a Moldavian tale published by author and folklorist Grigore Botezatu with the title Dragan-The-Bold (Russian: "Драган-удалец"; English: "Brave Dragan"), an old woman has three sons who grow up in days and develop the ability to fly. In the same kingdom, a dark cloud appears one day, and three dragons from the netherworld kidnap the king's three daughters and steal the sun, the moon and the stars, casting the kingdom in darkness. Dragan, the youngest, and his elder brothers take on the task. For three years, they venture in the world until they reach the center of the Earth, where there is a hole that leads to the netherworld. Dragan goes down the hole and, transforms into a bee to spy on a witch named Scorpion, mother of the dragons, and their wives. The wives talk about their husbands passing by a copper bridge, a silver bridge, and a golden bridge. Dragan-The-Bold kills each of the dragons in each of the bridges, and pockets the luminaries. After learning of the death of her sons, the witch Scorpion goes after Dragan to eat him. Dragan, however, remembers that his mother had a brother (his uncle) named Kozma Dimir, who lives in the netherworld and works as a blacksmith. After killing her with his uncle's help, Dragan finds the princesses and guides them to a rope that leads to the upper world. Dragan's brothers betray him and cut off the rope, stranding him in the nether world. Dragan returns to Kozma Dimir's smithy and asks him how he can get back to the surface. His uncle tells him to go to grandfather Valerian's orchard and climb the Apple-tree of life in his orchard.

In a Moldovan tale titled How Ionike Fet-Frumos freed the Sun (Russian: "Фэт-Фрумос и Солнце"; English: "Fet-Frumos and the Sun"), the dragons steal the Sun, and many people in the kingdom assemble to get it back. On the outskirts of the kingdom, the male half of a poor couple leaves to join the others, and never returns. The wife gives birth to a son named Ion, whom she calls Ionike Fet-Frumos. After the boy is old enough, he decides to follow in his father's footsteps and try to rescue the Sun. He sings a song that draws the tsar's attention, who takes him in as his ward. When Ionike is old enough, he bridles a lame-looking colt in the stables, which becomes a might stallion, and both ride to restore the Sun. Ionike reaches three bridges, where he fights a dragon on each: Dusk on the first, Evening on the second, and Midnight on the third. During the third battle, however, Ionike and his foe are of equal standing, when a kite flying overhead is convinced by Ionike to bring some water to restore his strength. With renewed vigour, Ionike defeats Midnight and presses on. When he arrives near the dragons' castle, where the sun is being kept, his horse gives him a hair for him to shapeshift into a fly and spy on the meeting between the dragons' wives. It happens thus and he learns of the wives' wicked plan to kill him: one will turn into a well of poisoned water, the second into an apple-tree and the third into a grapevine. Ionike buzzes as a fly into the castle's dungeons and releases the Sun back to the sky. On the journey back, Ionike and his horse pass by the dragons' wives, transformed into the dangers they planned to become, and Ionike strikes them all dead. Finally, only the dragons' mother remains, who turns into a dark lightning cloud that chases after the hero. Ionike's horse takes him to a smithy by the road and they bolt the door. Inside the smithy, Ionike heats up a cudgel and makes a hole in the wall for the dragons' mother to place her large maw through. She does and Ionike feeds her the red-hot cudgel, killing her.

==== Hungary ====
In Hungary, the tale type is known as type AaTh 328A*, Freeing a heavenly body or Az Égitestszabadító ("The Celestial Saviour"): the dragons capture the celestial lights; the hero and his companions seek the help of the smith of the world or the Earth; then the hero confronts the dragons on the three bridges (of copper, silver and gold). In the second part, the hero, in animal form, spies on a meeting between the dragons' mother and her daughters-in-law, where they plot the heroes' downfall; the hero vanquishes the dangers, and defeats the mother of the dragons by spilling hot lead inside her mouth with the help of the world smith.

This narrative was previously classified by Hungarian scholar János Berze Nágy in his own classification system as BN 319*, which, in the international index of Aarne-Thompson-Uther, corresponded to types 328A* and 300A. According to scholarship, Berze Nagy registered 30 Hungarian variants of type 319*. In addition, Hungarian scholar Ágnes Kovács, in Magyar Néprajzi Lexikon ("Hungarian Ethnographic Dictionary"), states that "traces" of the story were already known by the 18th century, in Palóc and Székely, while most of the variants collected in the 20th century originated from Szabolcs–Szatmár County.

===== Regional tales =====
In a Hungarian tale collected by Lájos Kálmány with the title Nap, Hold, Csillag kiszabadítása, the Sun, the Moon and the Star are being guarded by three multi-headed Sarkans (dragon-like creatures). Three brothers rise to take them back.

In a tale collected by Arnold Ipolyi with the title A tátos, the king laments that he must surrender his daughter to a twelve-headed dragon, else it will devour the sun. His three sons decide to stop their sister's sacrifice and march to deal with the dragon, but fail and the sun is taken by the dragon. As usual, the youngest son is the successful one, with the help of a horse with extraordinary abilities.

A related tale titled Zöldmezőszárnya ("Wings of the Green Field"; "Green Meadow's Wings") was collected from teller János Puji, in Marosszentkirály (Sâncraiu de Mureș) by ethnographer Olga Nagy (hu) and published in 1978. In this story, a king is prophesied to lose his three daughters when they are 18 years old. It so happens, and the Sun, the Moon and the stars also disappear in the same day. Elsewhere in the kingdom, three sons are born to a poor woodcutter in the same day, one during the night, the second at midnight, and the third at dawn. They each grow up in hours, take their horses and reach three bridges. On one they fight a 12-headed dragon, on a golden bridge a 24-headed one, and on the diamond bridge a 32-headed dragon. After rescuing the luminaries, their mission is to find the lost princesses. They go to the "Világkovács" ('The World Blacksmith') and have to contend with the mother of the three dragons.

In the tale Kiss Miklos, and the Green Daughter of the Green King, translated by Jeremiah Curtin, a father, on his deathbed, tells his three sons their kingdom is cast in darkness because the Sun and the Moon have been stolen, and that one of the three is destined to get them back. The three brothers begin their quest. Kiss Miklos takes a lame horse and waits by the silver bridge for the coming of the twelve-headed dragon riding the milk-white, black-maned steed of the moon. He defeats the dragon and moves to the golden bridge, where he springs a trap on the 24-headed dragon riding on the steed of the sun. The battle between both evolves to a magical duel where one becomes a blue flame and the other a red flame. Kiss Miklos kills the second dragon and takes the sun. Some time later, he arrives at a cabin where the dragons' wives and mother are discussing their plans. Later, after killing the wives, Kiss Miklos arrives at the abode of Lead Friend (or Lead-Melting Friend), buys a great quantity of molten lead and both pour it down on the witch mother's mouth, killing her. The tale segues into another tale type, ATU 513A, "How Six Made Their Way Into the World", where Kiss Miklos and another group of superpowered individuals work together to gain a princess.

==== East Slavic languages ====
According to Russian scholarship, similar stories are attested in the East Slavic tale corpus, under the classification 300A*, "Возвращение змееборцем похищенных змеем небесных светил" ("Returning the celestial lights stolen by a serpent"). Russian scholar Lev Barag, who updated this classification index in 1979, noted that the story of the recovery of the celestial lights led into East Slavic type SUS 300A, "Fight on Kalinov Bridge", whose last episode is the killing of the witch with the aid of the smith. According to Russian scholarship and folklorists, this Kalinov Bridge appears in East Slavic folklore as a liminal space, since the bridge crosses over a swamp or a fiery river named Smorodina, and upon it the hero does battle with the wicked villain (e. g., Chudo-Yudo, Zmei Gorynych).

The name "Kalinov" has been variously interpreted to mean "blazing", "incandescent", in regards to it being made of iron; or "a type of tree or flower", such as the guelder-rose tree (Viburnum).

According to professor Jack V. Haney, stories about a fight between the hero and a villain on a bridge are "common" in East Slavic. In another work, Haney translated the term as "Kalin Bridge". Similarly, according to folklorist Petro Lintur, a "characteristic" element of East Slavic texts is the episode of the smiths Kusma and Demjan helping the hero defeat the dragon, tying the creature to a plough and making a trench with it. More specifically, Kuzma and Demyan appear in Russian variants, while the Ukrainian texts include saints Boris and Gleb in the role, and sometimes Saint Peter.

Jack V. Haney and Polish folklorist Julian Krzyzanowski suggested that the appearance of the story in the oral repertoire of other peoples derives from East Slavic influence (e.g., in Poland's case, from Russia).

===== Russia =====
In a South Russian tale translated by William Ralston Shedden-Ralston as Ivan Popyalof, the titular hero, who lay in the ashes of the stove for 12 years, decides to battle a villainous zmey (called 'Snake', in the story) to rescue the Sun for the day to return to his land. Ivan and two companions defeat the zmey, but the Snake's daughters and wife try to enact their revenge on the heroes. At last, the Snake's Wife pursues Ivan Popyalof to the forge of Kuzma and Demian. Haney argues for a certain antiquity in this tale, since it mentions the pair of smiths Kuzma and Demian.

===== Belarus =====
According to professor Andreas Johns, in one version from Belarus, the Sun, the Moon and the stars are stolen by sorcerer Koschei. The hero, then, has to contend with Koschei's sons, daughters and serpent wife.

In a Belarusian tale translated to English as The Widow's Son, the nine-headed serpent, Thunder-Wonder, steals the sun and the moon from the sky. Meanwhile, a widow's son and a merchant's son are great friends and play together. The merchant's son tells the king his friend is strong at their age, and can become even stronger. The king wishes to see the widow's son and sends for him, who says he wants to eat ox liver to become even stronger yet so that he will be able to retrieve the luminaries. When he grows up, the Widow's son bids the prince and his friend, the merchant's son, join him in his journey to return the luminaries, and they are gifted a mace each. They stop by a witch's hut that spins on chicken legs near a log bridge. The Widow's Son stands guard on the bridge, and fights a three-headed Thunder-Wonder, a six-headed Thunder-Wonder, and the nine-headed Thunder-Wonder. After a fierce battle, the Widow's Son kills the nine-headed Thunder-Wonder, retrieves the Sun and the Moon and hangs them back in the sky. People rejoice, and his friends celebrate with a feast, but the Widow's Son is alert about the remaining peril: the widows of the Thunder-Wonders. Thus, he dons a lowly disguise as a humble labourer and goes to find work in their castle. He is hired as a servant and spies on the widows plotting their revenge: one will turn into a spring of deadly water, the second will turn into an apple tree whose fruits will kill the heroes, and the third will turn into a large meadow to rest and they will die. The Widow's Son and his friends pass by the dangers and the Widow's Son strikes the spring, the tree and the meadow, killing the widows in their disguise. With the threat vanquished, the Widow's Son lets his friends return home to their parents, while the Widow's Son wanders the world since he has no father. He reaches the realm of Tsar Constance, who wants him to arrange a match between Baba Karghota's twelfth daughter and Tsar Constance's daughter. In his way, the Widow's Son meets strange companions with their specific powers, and they join forces.

===== Ukraine =====
In a Ukrainian tale translated as The brave lad that brought the Sun, the Moon and the stars back to the people, a couple (a landlord and lady) wishes to have a son, and the wife is advised by a sorceress to catch a magic fish in the sea. The woman's husband buys it from some fishermen and gives it to his cook to prepare it. The cook, a Hutsul woman, eats a bit from the dish and gives it to her lady. Nine months later, the lady and Hutsul woman give birth, respectively, to their sons. Years later, when the boys have grown up, the devils steal the sun, the moon and the stars. The Emperor promises to give his daughter, the princess, to whoever rescues the luminaries. The Hutsul woman's son agrees to fulfill the Emperor's quest after seeing the princess, and goes to the forest to wait for the first devil near a bridge. The first devil comes, and they fight in a magical combat: the devil becomes rain and the Hutsul boy fire, and he defeats the first devil, regaining the sun. He then spots a hut in the distance, turns into a fly and spies on the first devil's wife, who says she will turn into a pear tree. Next, the Hutsul lad kills the second devil in a magical transformation duel (him a pillar, the devil a stone), rescues the moon and spies on the second devil's wife (who will turn into a well); lastly, he faces the third devil and takes back the stars in a bag, save for one last star, given to the third devil's wife as a gift. The Hutsul youth takes the last star back and restores the luminaries to the sky, then goes back home. On the way there, he finds the pear tree and well, but pays no attention to them, fetches his mother and brings her to the Emperor's palace, where he marries the princess.

==== Slovakia ====
Author Ján Francisci-Rimavský published a Slavic tale titled Slncoví kuon ("The Sun's Horse"), which was sourced as Hungarian-Slovenish by Albert Wratislaw. However, author Josef Wenzig translated it into German as Das Sonnenroß and sourced it from Slovakia. In this tale, in a darkened land, the only source of light is a horse with a sun-shaped mark on its forehead that belongs to the king and shines its light on its daily voyage. However, the horse has disappeared, stolen by three enemy kings. The king knocks on the door of an old seer and begs him to take back the sun horse. The Seer leaves with a young companion. He turns into a little bird and visits the wives of each enemy king. In this shape, he overhears each queen lament over her husband's absence, but an old woman named Striga, mother of all three queens, enters her daughter's chambers abruptly demanding the queen kills the little bird. The Seer flies away and returns to his companion, knowing the location of the three kings. So he travels to a bridge and lies in waiting. The first two kings pass by the bridge and are killed by the Seer. When the youngest king passes by the bridge with the Sun Horse, he notices something amiss and challenges the Seer to a duel. The Seer and the king change into "waggon-wheels" and different coloured flames and face each other in a magical duel. An old man passes by the event and the Seer, in the shape of a flame, begs the old man to bring some water to put out the other flame. The old man does and the youngest enemy king dies. Sensing their sons-in-law have been defeated, the Striga takes her three daughters and fly away to enact her revenge. Meanwhile, the Seer has found the Sun Horse and makes his way back with his companion. On the way, the companion sees a fruit-bearing tree, a stream and a garden of flowers, but the Seer knows they are disguises for the Striga's three daughters, and strikes each one, drawing a pool of blood. The tale continues as type AaTh 468, "The Tree that Reached up to the Sky" and ATU 302, "The Ogre's Heart in an Egg". The tale was also translated into English as The Sun Horse and as The Flaming Horse: The Story of a Country where the Sun never shines.

==== Georgia ====
Georgian scholarship also registers variants of type ATU 300A in Georgia. In these tales, the hero defeats the ogres on a bridge, then kills the wives of the ogres, and at last kills his final foe with the help of the smiths.

==== Chuvash people ====
In a tale from the Chuvash people titled "Сказание об освобождении солнца и месяца из плена" ("Story of the Liberation of the Sun and the Moon from Captivity"), translated into Hungarian as Hogyan mentették meg a vitézek a napot meg a holdat ("How the Knights rescued the Sun and Moon"), a Great Dragon steals the Sun and the Moon, casting the world in darkness. Three knights are born in the meantime, named Earth-Knight, Oak-Knight and Mountain-Knight. They join forces to fight the Great Dragon and his sons and restore the luminaries.

==== Mordvin people ====
In a tale from the Mordvin people titled "Ивашка Приметлев" ("Ivashka Primetlev"), in a kingdom, something steals the Sun, the Moon and the stars, casting the realm in darkness. The king gathers the people and offers half of his kingdom as prize to anyone that can bring them back. A youth named Ivashka Primetlev offers to go. He is joined by a companion. They stop by a bridge. While his companion is asleep, Ivashka waits by the bridge for the coming of the five-headed Pryamaryalya. They engage in combat and the youth kills his many-headed foe. He continues his quest by going to another bridge and fighting a seven-headed Pryamaryalya, and a third bridge, where he fights a nine-headed Pryamaryalya. Later, Ivashka spies on the mother and the wives of the three many-headed foes, and learns them will avenge their fallen relatives: each of the wives will become a fountain, an apple tree and a storm to deceive Ivashka and his companion. However, Ivashka, wary of the deceit, kills the fountain and the apple tree. As for the third wife, the storm chases after Ivashka and his companion, until they find a forge on the road. With the help of the smith, Ivashka kills the third wife. Later, Ivashka gathers a group of skilled individuals to find the daughter of Baba Buryaga.

==== Mari people ====
Scholar S. S. Sabitov located a similar narrative in the "Catalogue of Tales of Magic from the Mari people", indexed as type 300A, "Бой на мосту" ("Fight on the Bridge"): the hero defeats the multiheaded snakes, then faces their sisters and their mother; at the end of the tale, he hides in the forge and destroys the snake mother with the help of the smiths.

==== Baltic languages ====
Lithuanian ethnologist Nijole Laurinkiene noted that in similar tales from Baltic mythology (mainly, Latvian and Lithuanian), the Sun and the Moon are stolen by Velns (Velnias), a creature that represents the underworld, while their liberator wields a hammer.

===== Lithuania =====
According to professor Jūratė Šlekonytė, Lithuania registers 51 variants of type ATU 300A, collected "mostly in central and northern" parts of the country.

===== Latvia =====
In the Latvian Folktale Catalogue, tale type ATU 300A* is titled Puisis iegūst ķēniņa meitu ("The Man gets the King's Daughter"). Its second redaction, titled Pazudusī saule ("The Stolen Sun"), pertains to the rescue of the luminaries by the hero.

==== Finnic languages ====
Nijole Laurinkiene noted that in the Finnish Kalevala and the Karelian legends, the luminaries are stolen by a being related to darkness and death, like Louhi, ruler of the northernmost land of Pohjola. The liberator of the luminaries, however, is a character related to smithing: the smith himself or his daughter (in the oldest versions, Laurinkiene supposes), or the Son of God, in more Christianized tales.

===== Karelia =====
In a Karelian tale, "Ольховая Чурка" ("The Block of Alder Wood"), an old man carves a son out of wood to fulfill his wife's wishes to rock a baby in a cradle. After three years, the wooden figure is given life and calls the old couple his parents. Due to his great strength, he leaves home and meets two other companions. The trio reaches a kingdom where the Sun has been stolen by a nine-headed serpent, the moon by a six-headed serpent, and the dawn by a three-headed serpent. After the heroes kill the serpents and rescue the celestial bodies, the serpents' mother, the witch Syöjätär, plans her revenge on the heroes. A nearly identical story was translated by Parker Fillmore as Log: The Story of the Hero Who Released the Sun, and sourced from Finland.

Ethnologist Nijole Laurinkiene reported another Karelian version of the theft and release of the celestial bodies. In this version, in an "hymn about the Sun's liberation", the world has been cast in darkness, and the Son of God (or the smith's daughter, in another version), journeys to Hiitola, "the land of devils", to free the Sun and the Moon.

===== Finland =====
In a Finnish tale translated as Leppä Polkky and the Blue Cross, an old man named Jukka and his wife long to have a child, so they bring home an alder stump and place it the cradle to rock it. For three years, they rock the alder stump as if a son, until one day a wizard turns the alder stump into a boy while both man and woman are away from the cradle. The boy grows up and is named Leppä Polkky ("Alder Stump"), and becomes incredibly strong. One day, all of a sudden, a thick darkness falls over the world. A Lapland wizard explains to the king that a witch named Loviatar and her three serpent sons stole the Sun ("Aurinko"), the Moon ("Kuu") and the Dawn ("Päivänkoitto"). Leppä Polkky finds two other companions and they depart on a journey. They meet a wise old woman named Leski-Akka, who reveals that the three serpent sons not only stole the celestial lights, but are threatening the country unless the king surrenders each of his daughters as sacrifice for the serpents. Leppä Polkky and his allies kill the serpent sons and restore the luminaries. The trio journey back to their kingdom, but Leppä Polkky sees a hut in the middle of the forest and takes a look inside: it is Loviatar, conspiring with fellow witches her terrible revenge. Loviatar will send them hunger and place a table with food before them, then thirst and create a pool of drinkable water, and lastly sleep and place beds in front of them, and casts a curse that, if anyone reveals her plans, they shall become a blue cross. Leppä Polkky and his allies defeat Loviatar's new plot. Leppä Polkky goes after Loviatar, but she orders him to bring Katrina of Kiijoki, the most beautiful princess in the world. With the help of new companions with strange and extraordinary powers (tale type ATU 513, "The Wonderful Companions"), Leppä Polkky brings Katrina of Kiijoki.

===== Estonia =====
Although the story seems to lack the first part (rescue of the celestial bodies), Estonian variants of type 300A, "Võitlus sillal", still follow the three heroes and the battle on the bridge against the "Evil One". As a continuation, the heroic trio descends into Hell, where the wives of the evil spirits conspire against them. The tales still ends with the blacksmith feeding the witch hot coals to kill her.

== See also ==
- Kalevala
- "The Widow's Son" (be) (Belarusian fairy tale)
- Storm-Bogatyr, Ivan the Cow's Son
