= A String of Pearls Twined with Golden Flowers =

Romanian fairy tale

Folk tale
- Name: A String of Pearls Twined with Golden Flowers
- Also known as: The Golden Twins; Pearls, Thread Yourselves
- Mythology: Romanian
- Country: Romania
- Related: The Boys with the Golden Stars

A String of Pearls Twined with Golden Flowers, The Golden Twins or Pearls, Thread Yourselves (Romanian: Înşiră-te mărgăritari) is a Romanian fairy tale collected by Petre Ispirescu in Legende sau basmele românilor.

The tale is classified in the international Aarne-Thompson-Uther Index as type ATU 707, "The Three Golden Children", albeit following a specific narrative that is found in Romania, Moldova, and Hungary, as well as in other Eastern European and Balkanic countries. These tales refer to stories where a girl promises a king she will bear a child or children with wonderful attributes, but her jealous relatives or the king's wives plot against the babies and their mother.

== Source ==
According to Daniel Gicu's research, the tale was collected by Ispirescu in 1876 from a soldier named Mihai Constantin.

== Synopsis ==
A young and handsome king, whenever he could leave his duties, liked to wander the world. He passed by the castle of an emperor and heard his three daughters speak. They all wished they could marry him; the oldest said that she would keep his house clean; the second, that she would make his house like two golden apples; the third, that she would bear him golden twins. He married the third, and she became pregnant, but his old favorite, a gypsy slave, envied the queen. When the children were due, the king had to go to war. He was greeted back with two puppies, which he was told the queen had borne. He made the queen a slave, and the gypsy girl his queen.

In reality, the queen had borne two golden babies, but the gypsy girl had killed them and buried them in the vineyard. Two firs grew from their graves. At night, they turned into children again and went to nurse from their mother, which consoled her. The king liked the trees but the gypsy hated them, and she made him cut them down. The king had two beds made from them. In the night, the beds talked to each other; the one carrying the gypsy did not like it, but the one carrying their father liked it better. The gypsy girl heard it and had them burned. Two sparks flew into bran that an ewe had ate, and the ewe gave birth to two lambs with golden fleeces. The king saw these lambs and loved them. The gypsy girl had them killed and assigned the queen the task of washing out their entrails.

A crow caught some of the entrails and would not give it back without some cornmeal; the miller would not give her cornmeal without a chicken; a hen would not give her chick without corn; but a kind farmer gave her corn, the hen then gave her a chick, the miller then gave her cornmeal, and the crow then gave her back the piece – but more had washed away while she did this, and she could not retrieve it.

The entrails caught on a snag, and when the waters retreated, they became a girl and a boy. The boy cut down osiers with his hatchet and the girl spun on her distaff, and people came to look at their beauty. The king was so delighted that he took them home, and the gypsy girl did not dare do anything to them. One day she broke her pearl necklace and it could not be rethreaded; the pearls escaped everyone's fingers. The king asked the children to do it, and they could. While they did it, the boy told the king the story of their lives (with a refrain of "o, a string of pearls twined with golden flowers"). The king had the gypsy girl stoned to death and restored his queen.

== Analysis ==
=== Tale type ===
The tale is classified in the international Aarne-Thompson-Uther Index as type ATU 707, "The Three Golden Children". Despite being classified as type 707, the narrative differs in its intermediate part: the twin children are buried and go through a cycle of incarnations, from trees (firs, walnut trees, apple trees, etc.), to objects, to animals (lambs, rams or birds) to human children again.

Folklorist Corneliu Barbulescu studied the Romanian variants of tale type 707 and discerned two narratives: one that matches the international tale type (youngest of three sisters gives birth to three children who are cast in water; siblings go on quest for marvellous objects), which only registers 18 variants in Romania, and another with 44 texts, involving twin children being buried and undergoing a cycle of reincarnations. Barbulescu termed the second cycle, unlisted in the international index, as type 707C*, Însiră-te mărgăritar, after a tale published by Petre Ispirescu. In this cycle, the king marries a woman that promises wonder children, but they are buried in the garden; from their graves, two trees with golden leaves or golden fruits sprout which bend down respectfully for the king; the trees are made into beds which talk at night, are burned; two sparks escape and are eaten by a goat, which gives birth to two golden-fleeced lambs that are killed; its entrails are washed in the river, but wash away and are carried away by the river to a willow tree, where the twins regain human form; they later are found by a shepherd, go to their father's court and tell the whole story.

Writer and folklorist Cristea Sandu Timoc considered that Insir-te margarite and variants were typically Romanian, and belonged to tale type AaTh 707C*. He also reported that "more than 70 variants" of this subtype were "known" (as of 1988), closely connected to the international type ATU 707, "The Three Golden Children".

=== Motifs ===
The opening sequence, of a woman promising to bear fabulous children and their kidnapping, is a common fairy tale motif, but in most such tales – "Ancilotto, King of Provino", "The Three Little Birds", "The Dancing Water, the Singing Apple, and the Speaking Bird", "The Wicked Sisters" – the children are abandoned, rather than murdered. The villains are overwhelmingly the heroine's jealous sisters, or her mother-in-law, rather than a rival as in this tale.

The transformation chase described here is found in another Romanian tale of this type, "The Boys with the Golden Stars". Even in this tale, however, the villain of the piece is the mother-in-law. The Chinese "The Pretty Little Calf" has the child murdered and restored in animal form; only the transformation to and from the title calf occurs, but it is more closely related to this tale in the villains, who are the first and second wife, the heroine being an official's third wife.

== Variants ==
=== Romania ===
Journalist Eustace Clare Grenville Murray collected a Romanian variant titled Sirte-Margarite. In this tale, two sisters promise grand things to the king, the youngest that she will bear twins with golden hair. After their birth, her elder sister replaces the twins for other babies and buries them in the garden. The twins become two fir trees and console their mother, imprisoned in the dungeon. The elder sister orders the trees to be felled down and burnt, but two sparks escape. The twins regain human form and appear at a gathering (a "claca") to retell their story as they string together pearls from a basket.

Another variant was collected and published by I. C. Fundescu with the name Insirte-Margarite, in 1875.

Romanian folklorist Dumitru Stăncescu collected a tale titled Inșir te Mărgărite cu dalbe flori aurite from an informant named Ion Georgescu. In this variant, an emperor passes by the castle of a neighbour emperor and overhears the conversation between the three princesses, the youngest promising to bear twin boys of gold in case she marries the emperor. A gypsy servant takes the children as soon as they are born and buries them in the garden. The twins go through a cycle of reincarnations and return to human shape. At the end of the tale, the twins appear at the emperor's court and tell their story to the court.

=== Moldova ===
A variant from northern Moldavia was collected from teller Sanda Buftea, from Broscăuți, and published by Romanian author Elena Niculiță-Voronca in 1903 with the title Suie-te, mărgăritari mare.
