= Pârâul Roșu =

Pârâul Roșu may refer to the following rivers in Romania:

- Pârâul Roșu, tributary of the Azuga in Brașov County
- Pârâul Roșu (Olteț), tributary of the Olteț in Olt County
- Pârâul Roșu, tributary of the Teleajen in Prahova County

== See also ==
- Valea Roșie (disambiguation)
