= Valea Roșie =

Valea Roșie may refer to the following places in Romania:

- Valea Roșie, a village in Șopotu Nou Commune, Caraș-Severin County
- Valea Roșie, a village in Mitreni Commune, Călărași County
- Valea Roșie, a tributary of the Azuga in Prahova County
- Valea Roșie (Crișul Negru), a tributary of the Crișul Negru in Bihor County
- Valea Roșie, a tributary of the Firiza in Maramureș County
- Valea Roșie, a tributary of the Bănița in Hunedoara County
- Valea Roșie, a tributary of the Geoagiu in Hunedoara County
- Valea Roșie (Mureș), a tributary of the Petriș in Arad County
- Valea Roșie (Olt), a tributary of the Olt in Covasna County
