= Petre Dulfu =

Imperial austrian-born romanian poet, translator and playwright

Petre Dulfu (10 March 1856 – 31 October 1953) was an Imperial Austrian-born Romanian poet, translator and playwright.

== Biography ==
Born in Tohat, Sălaj County, his parents were Nichifor Dulfu and his wife Agapia (née Bran), both members of the rural intellectual class. From early childhood, his mother inspired a love of stories in him. He attended Hungarian-language primary school and gymnasium in Baia Mare from 1864 to 1871, earning top marks, and went to high school in the same town from 1872. In 1876, he graduated from high school in Cluj, where he studied for two years. He attended Franz Joseph University in the latter city, earning a doctorate in philosophy in 1881. His thesis, written in Hungarian, dealt with the work of Vasile Alecsandri, surveyed the Romanian literary context and included a dozen poems translated by Dulfu. After graduation, he moved to the Romanian Old Kingdom and worked as a teacher. After a brief stint in the capital Bucharest, he directed and taught at a school in Turnu Severin for the 1881-1882 year. Beginning in 1882, he again taught philosophy and later Romanian in Bucharest; one of the two schools where he worked was a girls' school. He came to know faculty colleague Ioan Slavici, as well as Mihail Eminescu, Alexandru Vlahuță and Bogdan Petriceicu Hasdeu. In 1886, he married Elena Mateescu, with whom he had four children and who encouraged his work as a writer. He obtained Romanian citizenship in 1891. During World War I, he worked as a postal censor in the temporary capital of Iași, where an illness claimed one of his daughters. Although normally a disciplined teacher, he lost his composure on 1 December 1918, the day the union of Transylvania with Romania was proclaimed; cutting short the lesson and visibly moved, he explained the significance of the event to his pupils. In 1921, he retired from the girls' school, as the pupils daily reminded him of his deceased daughter.

His first published work consisted of verses that appeared in Familia in 1874. His contributions appeared in magazines both pedagogical (Educatorul, Lumina pentru toți, Revista pedagogică) and literary (Amicul familiei, Șezătoarea, Tribuna). In 1911, he joined the Romanian Writers' Society. In 1903, he was awarded the Romanian Academy's Adamachi Prize for his translations of Euripides (Ifigenia în Aulida, 1879; Ifigenia în Taurida, 1880) and for the 1894 Isprăvile lui Păcală, the volume that secured his reputation as a writer. He wrote two plays: the moralizing one-act Ceartă pentru nimica (1889) and Păcală argat, a dramatization of his favorite character, Păcală. His final work, Cei doi feți-logofeți cu părul de aur, appeared in 1939. In January 1939, Dulfu joined King Carol II's National Renaissance Front, as part of a mass recruitment among Romanian Writers' Society members. A gifted teacher and a cultural figure concerned with educating the peasantry, his poetic renditions of folklore were deemed "good writings for the common people" by George Călinescu. He died in Bucharest.

The Maramureș County library in Baia Mare has borne his name since 1992.
