= Legende sau basmele românilor =

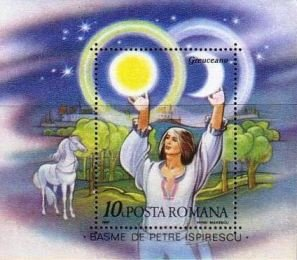
Romanian stamp from 1987 depicting the Greuceanu fairy tale

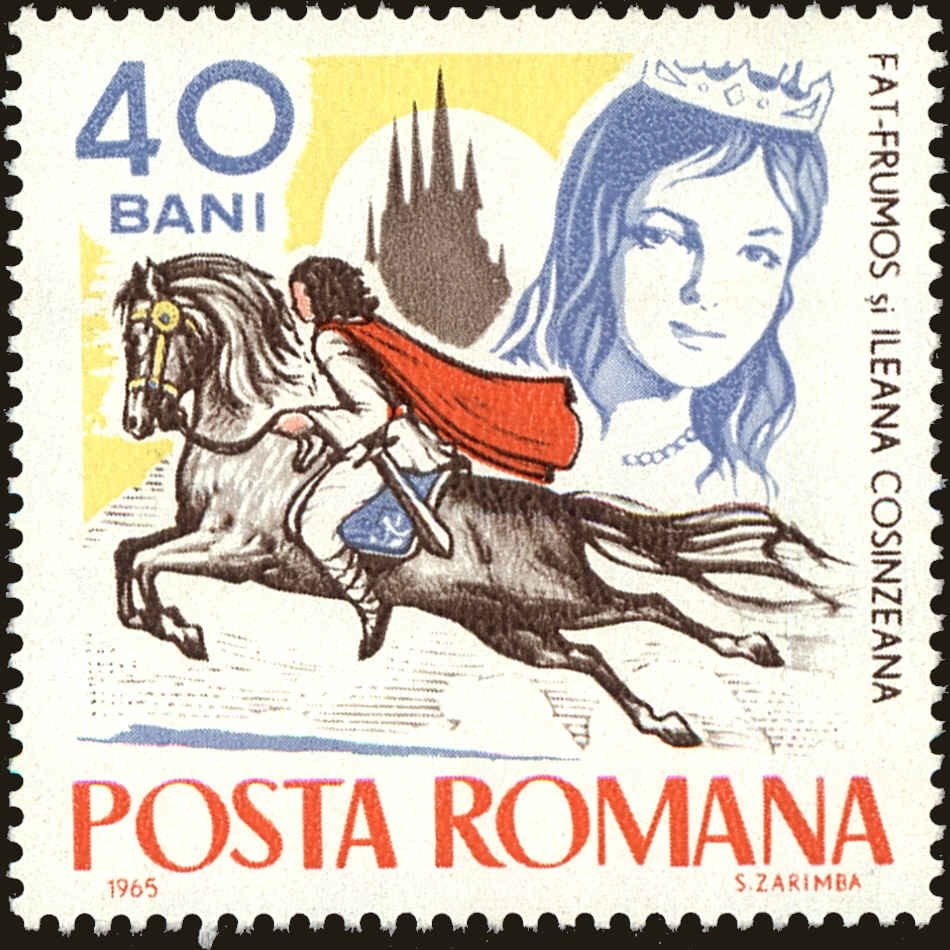
Romanian stamp from 1965 with Făt-Frumos and Ileana Cosânzeana

Legende sau basmele românilor ("Romanian Legends or Fairy-tales") is a collection, in several volumes, of Romanian folktales, first published in 1872 by Petre Ispirescu.

== Contents ==
(note: these are some of the tales)

- Tinerețe fără de bătrânețe și viață fără de moarte ("Youth Without Aging and Life Without Death")
- Ileana Sânziana
- Broasca țestoasă cea fermecată ("The Enchanted Turtle")
- Aleodor Împărat ("Emperor Aleodor")
- Porcul cel fermecat ("The Enchanted Pig")
- Înșiră-te mărgăritari ("Pearls, Thread Yourselves")
- Lupul cel năzdrăvan și Făt-Frumos ("The Egregious Wolf and Făt-Frumos")
- Prâslea cel voinic și merele de aur ("Prâslea the Brave and the Golden Apples")
- Voinicul cel cu cartea în mână născut ("The Hale Born with A Book in His Hands")
- Făt-Frumos cu părul de aur ("Făt-Frumos with the Golden Hair")
- Zâna munților ("Zâna of the Mountains")
- Balaurul cel cu șapte capete ("The Seven-Headed Balaur")
- Zâna zânelor ("The Fairies' Fairy")
- Greuceanu
- Cele douăsprezece fete de împărat și palatul cel fermecat ("The Twelve Daughters of the Emperor and the Enchanted Palace")
- Cei trei frați împărați ("The Three Emperor Brothers")
- Pasărea măiastră ("The Enchanted Bird")
- Hoțu împărat ("The Thief Emperor")
- Luceafărul de zi și Luceafărul de noapte ("The Morning Luceafăr and the Evening Luceafăr")
- Împăratul șerpilor ("The Emperor of the Snakes")
- Sufletul ("The Soul")
- Întâmplările lui Păcală ("The Adventures of Păcală")
- Împăratul cel fără de lege ("The Lawless Emperor")
- Sarea in bucate ("Salt in Dishes")
- Omul de piatră ("The Man of Stone")
