= Bobu (Olteț) =

- Location within Romania

Location
- Country: Romania
- Counties: Dolj County, Olt County

Physical characteristics
- Source
  - coordinates: 44°13′49″N 24°11′50″E
  - elevation: 145 m (476 ft)
- Mouth: Olteț
  - location: Bobu
  - coordinates: 44°14′08″N 24°19′18″E
  - elevation: 88 m (289 ft)
- Length: 12 km (7.5 mi)
- Basin size: 16 km^{2} (6.2 sq mi)

Basin features
- Progression: Olteț→ Olt→ Danube→ Black Sea

The Bobu is a right tributary of the river Olteț in Romania. It discharges into the Olteț in Bobu. Its length is 12 km (7.5 mi) and its basin size is 16 km^{2} (6.2 sq mi).
