= Sabin Drăgoi =

Romanian composer

Sabin Vasile Drăgoi (Romanian pronunciation: [saˈbin drəˈɡoj]; 6 June 1894 – 31 December 1968) was a Romanian composer, who specialized in folk music. His oeuvre includes orchestral and chamber works, film music and operas.

He was born in a peasant family from Seliște, Arad County. After studying at a teachers' seminary in Arad and at the music conservatory in Cluj, he went to the Prague Conservatory, where he studied composition with Vítězslav Novák. From 1924 to 1950 he was professor of composition, harmony, and counterpoint at the conservatories in Timișoara and Bucharest, and from 1940 to 1944 he was the director of the opera house in Timișoara.

== Major works ==
- Constantin Brâncoveanu
- Kir Ianulea
- Horia
- The Misfortune (Năpasta)
