= Zmeoaică =

Character in Romanian mythology

The Zmeoaică (plural: zmeoaice) is a character of the Romanian mythology. It is a negative character, the wife of a zmeu.
