= Valea Roșie (Mureș) =

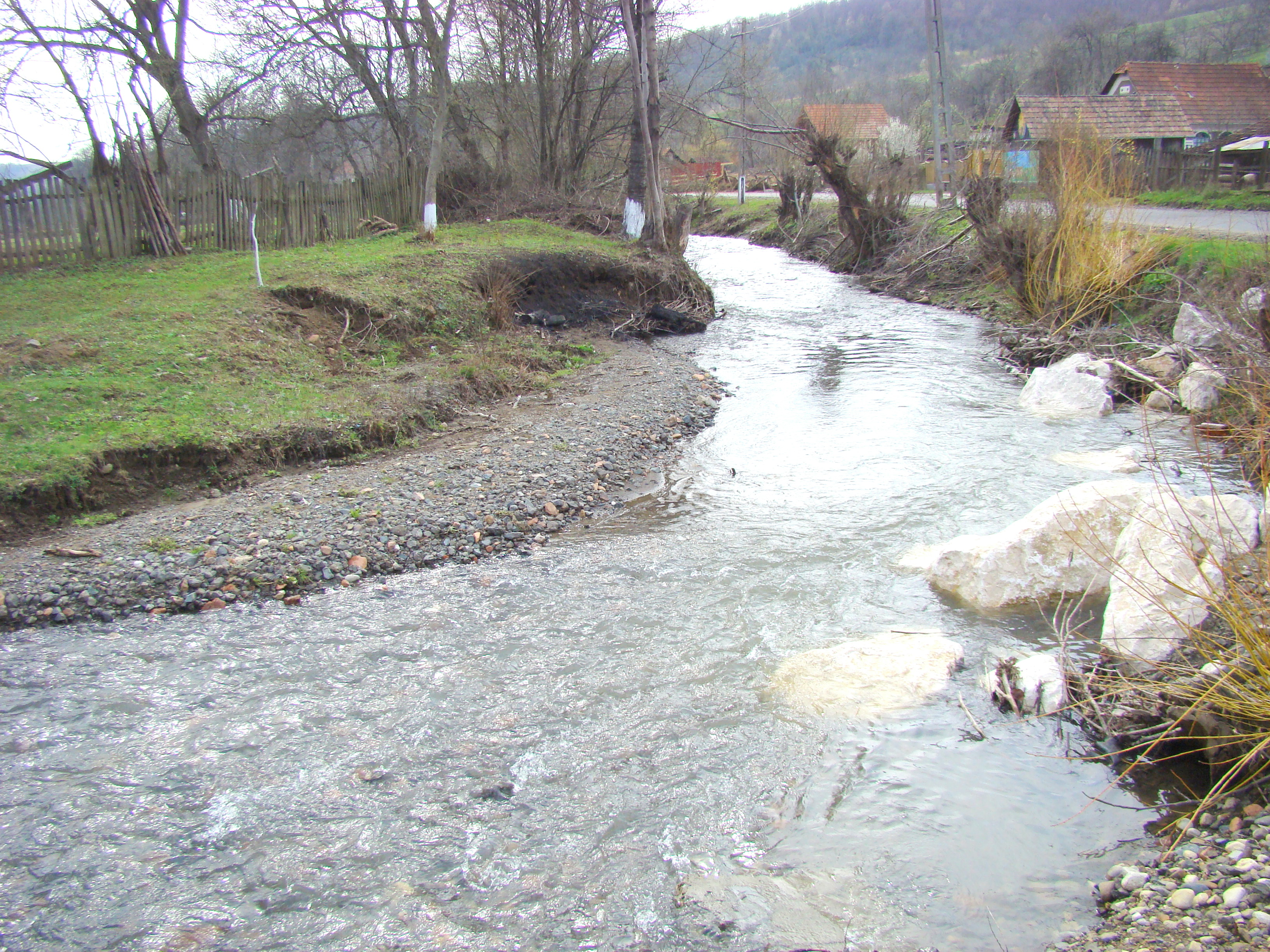

- Location within Romania

Location
- Country: Romania
- Counties: Arad County
- Villages: Roșia Nouă, Corbești

Physical characteristics
- Mouth: Petriș
  - location: Petriș
  - coordinates: 46.0420°N 22.3874°E
- Length: 18 km (11 mi)
- Basin size: 71 km^{2} (27 sq mi)

Basin features
- Progression: Petriș→ Mureș→ Tisza→ Danube→ Black Sea
- Tributaries
  - right: Timișoaia, Corbeasca

The Valea Roșie is a left tributary of the river Petriș in Romania. It flows into the Petriș in the village Petriș. Its length is 18 km (11 mi) and its basin size is 71 km^{2} (27 sq mi).
