= Dobrun, Olt =

Dobrun
- Commune
- Seal

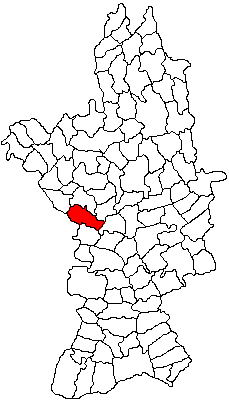
- Location in Olt County

- Location in Romania
- Coordinates: 44°16′N 24°13′E
- Country: Romania
- County: Olt
- Population (2021-12-01): 1,330
- Time zone: UTC+02:00 (EET)
  - Summer (DST): UTC+03:00 (EEST)
- Vehicle reg.: OT

Dobrun is a commune in Olt County, Oltenia, Romania. It is composed of five villages: Chilii, Dobrun, Roșienii Mari, Roșienii Mici, and Ulmet. It also included Bobu and Osica de Jos villages until 2004, when these split off to form Osica de Jos commune.
