= Petriș =

- Commune
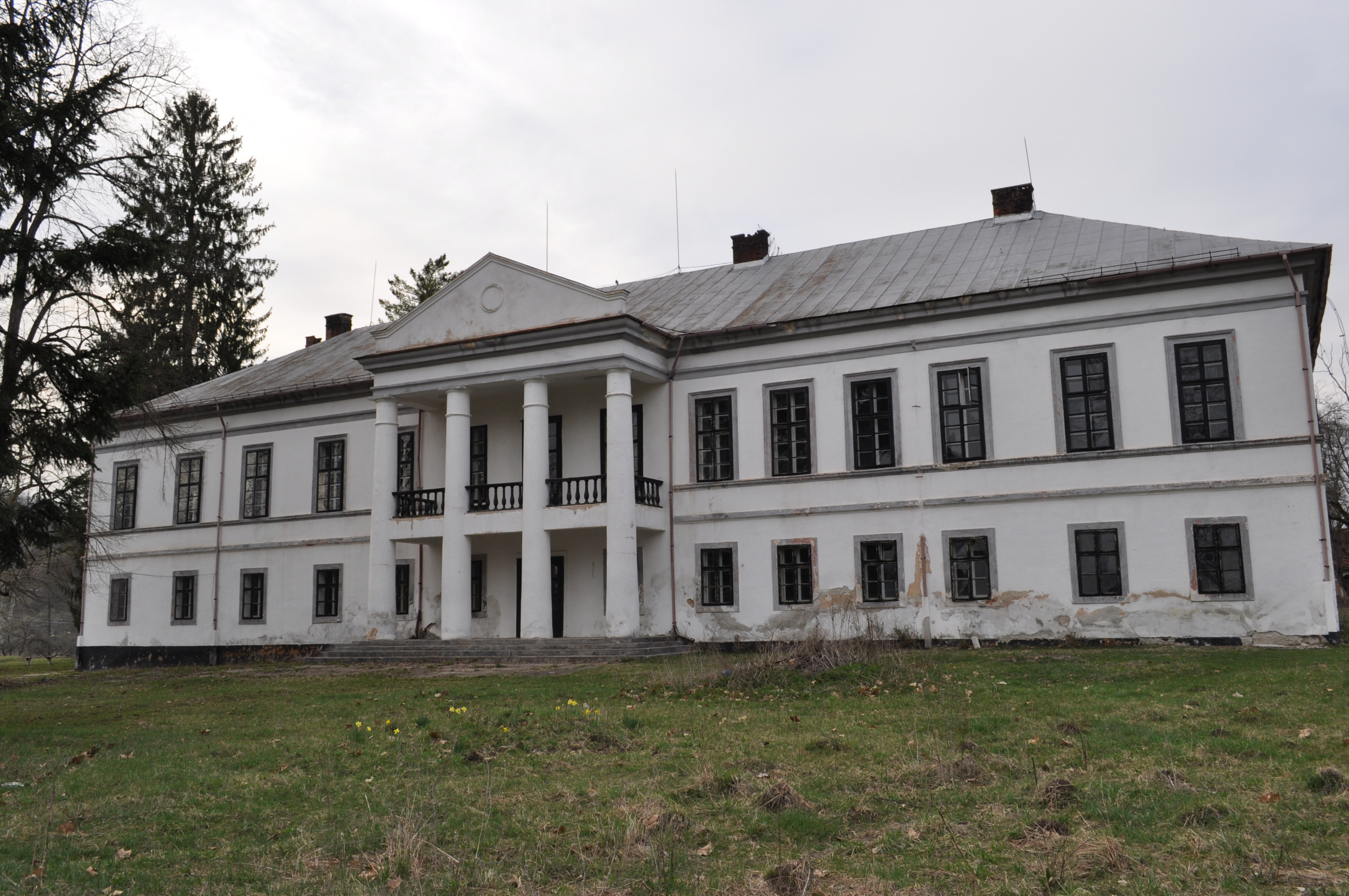
- The Salbek Castle

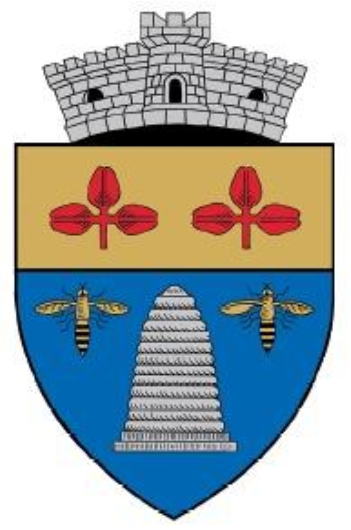
- Coat of arms

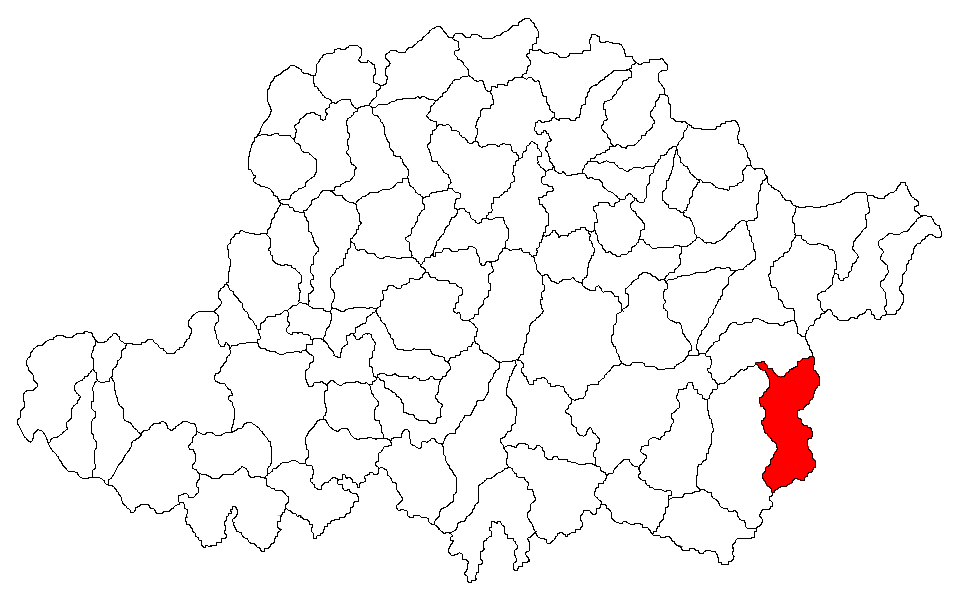
- Location in Arad County

- Location in Romania
- Coordinates: 46.05°N 22.3833°E
- Country: Romania
- County: Arad

Government
  - Mayor (2020–2024): Ionel Gheorghe Berari (PNL)
- Area: 130.59 km^{2} (50.42 sq mi)
- Elevation: 205 m (673 ft)
- Population (2021-12-01): 1,283
  - Density: 9.825/km^{2} (25.45/sq mi)
- Time zone: UTC+02:00 (EET)
  - Summer (DST): UTC+03:00 (EEST)
- Postal code: 317245
- Area code: (+40) 02 57
- Vehicle reg.: AR
- Website: comunapetris.ro

Petriș (Hungarian: Marospetres) is a commune in Arad County, Romania. It is composed of six villages: Corbești (Maroshollód), Ilteu (Iltő), Obârșia (Óborsa), Petriș, Roșia Nouă (Rósa), and Seliște (Marosszeleste).

== Geography ==
The commune lies on the banks of the Mureș River and of its left tributary, the Valea Roșie, at the contact zone of the Mureș Couloir with the Metaliferi Mountains. Petriș is located in the eastern part of the county, 106 km (66 mi) from the county seat, Arad, on the border with Hunedoara County. The administrative territory of the commune is 130.59 km^{2} (50.42 sq mi).

Petriș is traversed by the national road DN7, which links Bucharest with the Banat region. The Petriș and Ilteu train stations serve the CFR Line 200, which runs from Brașov to Arad and on to Curtici on the Hungarian border.

== Population ==
At the 2011 census, the commune had 1,525 inhabitants. At the 2002 census, 99.1% of the inhabitants were Romanians, 0.5% Hungarians, and 0.4% of other or undeclared nationalities.

== History ==
The first documentary records of Petriș, Corbești, Ilteu, and Roșia Nouă date back to 1743. Obârșia was attested documentarily in 1468, and Seliște in 1479.

== Natives ==
- Sabin Drăgoi (1894 – 1968), composer who specialized in folk music

== Economy ==
The commune's present-day economy can be characterized by a dynamic force, with significant developments in several sectors. Pomiculture and silviculture are well represented at the local level. The commune has an abundance of exploitable mineral resources, such as pyrites in Roșia Nouă.

== Tourism ==
One the main touristic sights of the commune is the complex of the Salbek Castle; built in 1811, the castle's design was inspired by that of the White House. In the past, the building served as a sanatorium for treating pneumophysiological diseases. In 2017, the property was bought by OMC Investments (a real estate development and investment company founded by Octav Botnar) to further the activities of the Botnar Foundation.

Other sights are the wooden church called "Nașterea Maicii Domnului" built in 1800 in Corbești; the wooden church named "Sfântul Mucenic Dimitrie" built in 1809 and painted in 1819 in Roșia Nouă; and the castle built in the 18–19th centuries in neoclassical style in Ilteu.
