= Petre Ispirescu =

Romanian writer, collector of fairy tales, and printer (1830–1887)

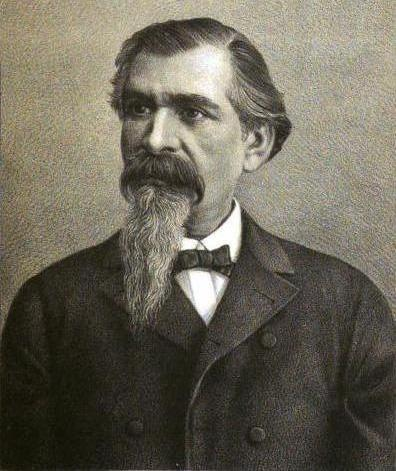
- Born: January 1830; Bucharest, Wallachia
- Died: 21 November 1887 (aged 57); Bucharest, Kingdom of Romania
- Resting place: Bellu Cemetery, Bucharest
- Occupations: Editor, folklorist, printer, and publicist
- Writing career
- Notable works: Legende sau basmele românilor (1872); Isprăvile și viața lui Mihai Viteazu (1876)

Petre Ispirescu (Romanian pronunciation: [ˈpetre ispiˈresku]; January 1830 – 21 November 1887) was a Romanian editor, folklorist, printer, and publicist. He is best known for his work as a gatherer of Romanian folk tales, recounting them with a remarkable talent.

== Career ==
Petre Ispirescu was born in Bucharest, the son of Gheorghe Ispirescu, a barber, and Elena Ispirescu, a remarkable story teller. He grew up listening to countless folk tales told by his parents and his father's customers and apprentices. His parents wanted him to be a priest and he was entrusted to study with a monk at the Metropolitan Church, after which he studied with a priest at the Domnița Bălașa Church.

He dropped out in 1844 at age fourteen and became an apprentice at the printing house headed by Zaharia Carcalechi, hoping to further his education by reading the books printed there. Working 14 hours a day, he became a qualified printer in 1848. In 1854, he was hired at the Copainie typography. In 1858, within the context of talks about the unification of the Romanian Principalities, the printing house accepted to publish the secret correspondence of Prince Nicolae Vogoride, without the accord of the censors. The police arrested all those involved and Petre Ispirescu was jailed for a month, losing his job. By the end of the year, Vasile Boerescu - a supporter of the union of the Romanian Principalities and future Foreign Minister - offered him the manager position of a modern typography that owned the first mechanical printing press in Bucharest and published the Naționalul newspaper. His position introduced him to contemporary politicians and writers like Ion Ionescu de la Brad, Nicolae Filimon, Ion Ghica, and Dimitrie Bolintineanu. In 1863, Vasile Boerescu sold the typography and Petre Ispirescu became the manager of the typography publishing the Liberal Party newspaper Romanul. At the time, the Liberal Party was the main opposition party. The newspaper was suppressed in 1864. Ispirescu, together with Walter Scarlat and Frederick Gobl, then founded the United Workers Typography. A year later, Ispirescu published the Romanian Typographer pamphlet. The abdication in 1866 of the first ruler of the United Principalities of Moldavia and Wallachia, Alexandru Ioan Cuza, is recorded with sadness there. After becoming the sole associate of the printing house, he renamed it Romanian Academy Publishing House in 1878.

Invited by the Interior Minister Ion Ghica, Ispirescu became the head of the State Printing House in 1866. He resigned two years later.

Ispirescu left Bucharest for the first time in his life in 1880 for a short trip to Roșiorii de Vede, a small town 74.5 miles away. In 1883 he had a first stroke; he suffered a second stroke while sitting at his desk, and died on 21 November 1887. He is buried at Bellu Cemetery in Bucharest along many other famous Romanians.

Ispirescu began to publish Romanian folk stories in 1862, at the incentive of Nicolae Filimon. His first collection of six folk tales appeared in Țăranul Român and later as a booklet. Subsequently, these tales were added to his renowned collection, Romanian Fairy Tales, today a bibliographic rarity. He resumed his publishing work in 1872 with the collection Romanian Folk Tales. Riddles and Proverbs with a preface by Bogdan Petriceicu Hasdeu, followed by Folk Anecdotes and Folk Tales in 1874, and The Life and Feats of Mihai Viteazu in 1876. He was praised for the deep and invaluable knowledge of the Romanian folk works. In 1879 he published Tales of the Wise Old Man - a retelling in an accessible language for children of universal myths and fragments of Greek mythology - with a preface by Alexandru Odobescu.

His major work, Romanian Fairy Tales, was published in 1882 with a preface by Vasile Alecsandri.

== Works ==
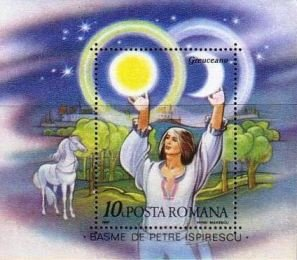
Romanian stamp from 1987 depicting Ispirescu's Greuceanu fairy tale

Ispirescu is especially known for his collections of Romanian folk tales.

- Colecție de șase basme in Țăranul Român (1862, a collection of six folk tales published in Țăranul Român)
- Legende sau basmele românilor. Ghicitori și Proverburi (1872, "Romanian Legends and Folk Tales. Riddles and Proverbs")
- Snoave și Povești populare (1874, "Folk Anecdotes and Folk Tales")
- Isprăvile și viața lui Mihai Viteazu (1876, "The Life and Feats of Mihai Viteazu")
- Poveștele unchiașului sfătos (1879, "Tales of the Wise Old Man")
- Pilde și ghicitori (1880, "Parables and riddles")
- Legendele sau basmele Românilor (1882, "Romanian Fairy Tales")
- Basme, snoave și glume (1883, "Tales, Anecdotes, and Jests")
- Jucării şi jocuri de copil (1885, "Children's Toys and Games")
- Povești morale. Despre pomul Crăciunului (1886, "Moral Stories. About the Christmas Tree")

== See also ==
- Kingdom in the Clouds (a 1969 film directed by Elisabeta Bostan)
- Dan Petrescu, Romanian businessman, nicknamed "Petre Ispirescu" by his friends in honor to Ispirescu
