= Roșiori (disambiguation) =

Roșiori may refer to several places in Romania:

- Roșiorii de Vede, a city in Teleorman County, Romania
- Roșiori, a commune in Bacău County
- Roșiori, a commune in Bihor County
- Roșiori, a commune in Brăila County
- Roșiori, a commune in Ialomița County
- Roșiori, a village in Răchiți Commune, Botoșani County
- Roșiori, a village in Vânători Commune, Mehedinți County
- Roșiori, a village in Dulcești Commune, Neamț County
- Roșiori, a village in Valea Vinului Commune, Satu Mare County
- Roșiori, a village in Forăști Commune, Suceava County
- Roșiori, a village in Bunești-Averești Commune, Vaslui County
- Roșiori, a village in the town of Luduș, Mureș County

Roșiori may also refer to:

- Roșiori (military unit), a type of elite cavalry unit in the Romanian Army.
