= Osica de Jos =

- Commune
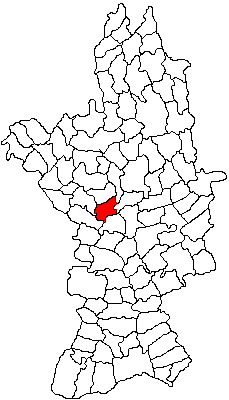
- Location in Olt County

- Location in Romania
- Coordinates: 44°15′N 24°17′E
- Country: Romania
- County: Olt
- Subdivisions: Bobu, Osica de Jos

Government
  - Mayor (2020–2024): Marian Pistol (PSD)
- Population (2021-12-01): 1,538
- Time zone: EET/EEST (UTC+2/+3)
- Postal code: 237153
- Vehicle reg.: OT

Osica de Jos (Romanian for "Lower Osica") is a commune in Olt County, in the historical region of Oltenia in Romania. It consists of two villages, Bobu and Osica de Jos. The commune was established in 2004 when the villages were split off from Dobrun. In the casual language of the inhabitants of the village and neighbouring towns, the village is called Osica Mică ("Small Osica") to make the distinction from the village of Osica Mare/Osica de Sus ("Upper Osica" or "Greater Osica"), which is larger in population and land surface.

The band of călușari from Osica de Jos has won many awards in folklore competitions.
