= Las barbas de plata =

Spanish fairy tale from Cádiz

Las barbas de plata (English: Silver Beard) is a Spanish fairy tale from Cádiz, published by Spanish scholars Julio Camarena and Maxime Chevalier. It is about the marriage between a human maiden and the Devil disguised as a suitor, but a talking mule rescues the maiden to another kingdom, where she marries a human prince. Spanish and Portuguese scholars locate similar tales in Iberian Peninsula.

== Summary ==
A widowed father has an only daughter, and issues a proclamation: he will only marry her off to a suitor with a silver beard. One day, the man is drinking his coffee, when a stranger appears to him, with the silver beard, as the proclamation stated. The stranger announces he intends to marry the man's daughter. The man calls for his daughter Mariquilla, who consents to the marriage, to be held on Saturday. Mariquilla goes to take her mule, when the animal begins to talk to Mariquilla, asking her that when Saturday comes she should bring a bag of clothes and take a ride on it, without telling anyone where she is going.

On Saturday, the stranger comes and a carriage is ready to take Mariquilla, but she takes the mule and rides away from home, reaching a distant castle by nightfall. She leaves the mule in the nearby village and takes shelter with a shepherd. A week goes by, and Mariquilla reads on the newspaper a castle is looking for a new squire to look after the horses. The girl disguises herself as a youth named Noé, takes on the job at the castle and brings the mule with her.

The prince falls for Noé, and suspects the squire is a woman. His mother, the queen, dismisses her son's ideas, but suggests they test his gender: first, invite Noé to dine with them, and, if he is a woman, she will eat many olives. Noé/Mariquilla's mule advises her to eat a single olive, in order to preserve her disguise. It happens thus. The next time, the queen suggests Noé takes a bath with the other servants. This time, the mule advises her to take the mule with her and let it loose to create a distraction; the other servants will try to rein it in, and Mariquilla can take her bath.

The mule's stratagem works twice. The third time, the queen suggests the prince, Juanillo, invites him as a sleeping companion; if Noé refuses, he is a woman. This time, the mule advises Mariquilla to reveal herself to the queen and explains the whole story. Mariquilla/Noé meets the queen and explains everything, and the queen marries her to prince Juanillo.

In time, the prince goes to war and leaves his pregnant wife at home. Mariquilla bears twins, a boy and a girl, and the queen sends a messenger to deliver a letter to the prince at the battlefield. However, the messenger meets on the way the silver-bearded suitor, who materialized a store. The messenger stays the night, and the silver-bearded suitor falsified the letter with a false information Mariquilla bore two puppies.

The messenger delivers the false letter to the prince, who writes back to his mother to keep his wife at the palace. The messenger passes by the same store and the silver-bearded falsified the second letter with a command to expel Mariquilla and the children. The second false letter arrives, the queen reads it and Mariquilla decides to fulfill the false request. She takes the children, some belongings and the mule with her, and they depart.

At a meadow, the mule tells Mariquilla to light a fire with firewood and throw the animal into the fire to burn; after it burns to cinders, blow on the ashes, and a castle will appear to her, and soon her husband and father will be with her. Mariquilla refuses to do it at first, but the mule insists she does it. Thus, with the mule's sacrifice, a splendid castle appears to house her. A person or the Virgin appears to Mariquilla, to tell her no harm will befall her.

Later, Mariquilla's husband and her father are each closing in on the castle, from different directions, and are welcomed by Mariquilla and her twins, whom they do not recognize. Her father sits with the girl on his lap and the boy on his father's lap. The girl points to her father, the prince, and says she prefers him, then bids her mother tells the group the same tale she tells the twins every night to lull them to sleep. Mariquilla has some reservations, since the two men are strangers, but relents and tells them the story of how everything transpired to her. Mariquilla's father drops dead on the spot, while the prince embraces her and his children. The family reunites, and makes their way back to the prince's palace.

== Analysis ==
=== Tale type ===
Spanish scholars Julio Camarena and Maxime Chevalier, in their joint Spanish Folktale Index, classified the tale as a new Spanish tale type: 533A, "Caballo mágico salva a la novia del diablo" ("The Magic Horse Saves the Devil's Bride"). In this type, the heroine makes a vow to marry a suitor with a certain uncommon trait, which the Devil, in human disguise, fulfills, and tries to marry her; however, the heroine's talking horse advises her to run away, and both escape to another kingdom, where she takes on a male disguise; in the male disguise, she befriends a human prince and eventually marries him; later, the heroine is left alone at home when the demonic suitor returns and threatens her and her children, but the talking horse appears one more time to save her, defeating the Devil and creating a new home for her (a tower, a hut, or a castle).

According to Basque researcher Koldo Biguri, Italian folklorist Sebastiano Lo Nigro located stories of the crossdressing heroine, her helpful horse and the flight from an unwanted monstruous suitor in Italy, Catalonia and Basque Country – which corresponds to Type C in Lo Nigro's study.

In a study about the European cycle of La Doncella Guerrera ("The Warrior Maiden"), French historian François Delpech identified a second form of the cycle, which he termed La fille qui a épousé le diable (English: "The girl who married the devil"). In this form, the crossdressing heroine is still put to the test of her gender, but she is helped by her faithful magic horse. Delpech also concluded that the heroine's horse is the one that rescues her from a terrible marriage with a supernatural being and sets her up with a beneficial human partner.

Haitian anthropologist Suzanne Comhaire-Sylvain studied an Haitian tale with the heroine's marriage with a monstrous bridegroom and her escape with the help of a horse. She compared the Haitian tale with African stories and a Basque tale collected by Paul Vinson, concluding that they "share the same origin". Comhaire-Sylvain also mentioned a Turkish tale (Kamertag) collected by Kúnos, which would point to an Eastern origin for the story.

=== Motifs ===
According to Chilean folklorist Yolando Pino Saavedra, in some variants, the heroine is betrothed or already married to a gentleman (who is a devil in disguise), and escapes from him in a "Magic Flight" sequence. Despite the presence of the motif, these tales are not classified as type ATU 313, "The Magic Flight".

=== Relation to other tale types ===
In an article in Enzyklopädie des Märchens, narrative researcher Ines Köhler-Zülch stated that this narrative (heroine and magic horse save themselves from demonic bridegroom) may also start as tale type AaTh 621, "The Flea": her father, the king, fattens a louse and uses its hide as a suitor's riddle; a demonic bridegroom guesses it right.

Italian scholar Sebastian Lo Nigro, in his study, noted that the motif of the sequence of falsified letters harks back to tale type ATU 706, "The Maiden Without Hands".

== Variants ==
=== Spain ===
In her catalogue of Spanish sources, scholar Montserrat Amores reports few variants of Spanish type 533A, "El Caballo Mágico salva a la novia del Diablo" (English: "The Magic Horse Saves the Devil's Bride"), in Spain.

==== Galicia ====
Galician ethnographer Lois Carré Alvarellos published a tale collected from San Xián de Sergude, titled Iria e o Cabalo Boligán ("Iria and the Horse Boligan"). In this tale, a princess named Iria does not want to marry anyone. One day, a horse in the stables, named Boligan, calls for her and advises her to tell her father she wants to marry a man with perfect ivory teeth, hoping that such a man does not exist. However, a man with this exact trait, a rich and powerful Moor, appears in the kingdom and asks to marry her. The princess cries over her fate, but the horse counsels her to take the horse with her. Some days into their journey, something startles the Moor's mount and he falls to the ground, allowing Iria to flee on her mount. She rides to a distant hut and rests with an old woman, who, the next day, gives the princess a tuft of sheep wool and a stack of needles. Iria journeys on, when her fiancé, the Moor, rides just behind them. Boligan, the horse, tells the princess to throw behind her the old woman's objects to delay the pursuit: the wool creates a mist and the needles great boulders. The third time, she throws behind her a piece of silk, creating a lake to deter the Moor. At a safe distance, the horse advises her to buy male clothes, take on a male name, Payo, and to find work as a king's page. The second king suspects Payo is a girl underneath the disguise and tries to unmask her by setting tests: to catch an apple between her legs; and to stay by the king's bed at night. Her horse, Boligan, however, warns her against every attempt. Eventually, Iria reveals herself and marries the king. Time passes, and a Moor army is at the king's door; Iria's husband, the king, borrows Boligan and marches to battle, leaving her at the castle. Iria notices that her former fiancé, the Moor, is leading the army, and gives birth to twin boys "like two suns". Her mother-in-law writes her son a letter with the good news, but a series of forged missives force the king's mother to carry out false orders to kill her. Crying, Iria takes her sons and leaves the kingdom, hoping to reach her father's homeland. One morning, she wakes up and sees her loyal horse Boligan in front of her. The horse tells her the Moorish king will come after her, but Boligan will fight him to the death; in case he dies, Iria is to take whatever she finds in his mouth. Just as the horse predicted, the Moor comes to kill her, but Boligan kills him in a fierce battle, and perishes, his form reverting to a human shape. Iria mourns for her fallen friend, gets his tongue and tosses it on the floor; a stone tower appears to house her and her children, furnished with everything they need. Back to Iria's husband, he returns home and, learning of the changed letters, begins a journey in search of her. He meets a long-bearded old man, and both ride to the stone tower. Inside, Iria welcomes them and, after dinner, embraces the king as her husband and the old man as her father. The Galician tale was listed by Camarena and Chevalier as a variant of their new tale type 533A, and also as a Galician variant of the same tale type in the Catalogue of Galician Folktales.

Researcher Marisa Rey-Henningsen collected a tale from a Galician source which she translated as The Countess's Daughter and The Talking Horse. In this tale, Floriña is the daughter of a rich woman who is a countess. Many men have courted her, but her mother does not want to surrender her to any man. Even a powerful Moorish king makes a bid for the girl's hand, and threatens to kill both mother and daughter if they do not agree to it. Floriña weeps, and walks a bit with her mother's horse, which begins to talk. It advises Floriña that she shall only marry a man with perfectly white teeth, white as the freshly fallen snow. The Moorish king says he is that man, and gets to marry Floriña. The horse laments that their initial plan failed, so it suggests the girl takes her mother's horse with her to her new home. On the journey to the Moorish king's house; the horse seizes the opportunity to bump into the moor and his horse, and gallops away with Floriña to a Christian king's land. In the Christian king's castle, Floriña trades her womanly clothes for a peasant's and a cap. She works as a page in the second king's castle, and the king suspects she is a woman, and not a man. The Christian king's mother advises him to test the page: ask him to show his hands (either their palms, if a man), throw him a bunch of kindlewood (he will catch it between his legs if a man), and finally to ask him to sleep with him in his bed. Floriña passes by the first two tests, and begins to undress herself to join the king in his bed, when they hear a commotion in the streets: the Moorish king comes back with an army in search of his wife. The Christian king tries to deter him, but the Moor kills him, and goes after Floriña. She escapes from the attack and calls out for her mother's horse, and the animal rides to her aid. They gallop together across a field of dead bodies, both Christians and Moors, and the animal advises her to take its tongue in the hour of dire need. The horse stops by the side of a bridge, the Moor king on the other side. The Moor changes into a sparrow hawk to fly over the water and reach Floriña, and the horse warns the girl to cut off its tongue. In a rapid movement, the girl grabs a knife, cuts off the horse's tongue and throws it on the ground: a solid tower springs up to protect her, while the horse fights the Moor. The Moor stabs the horse in the neck with his sword, and it falls to the ground. The horse changes into a human prince, and, in the confusion, takes the sword to kill the Moor. From inside the tower, Floriña sees the battle and climbs down the tower to help the man. She brings him inside the tower, dresses his wounds and restores him to full health. Despite him not talking at all, Floriña begins to fall in love with him, and, one day, kisses him: the tower disappears and the man regains his speech, telling the girl a wicked fairy cursed him to an equine shape. Floriña and the man journey back to her mother's land, where she learns her mother died of grief, but later she marries the man.

==== Catalan-speaking areas ====
Mallorcan priest Antoni Maria Alcover i Sureda collected a similar tale from a Mallorcan source named Madó Catalina Neula, in Son Carrió, which he published in the compilation Aplec de rondalles mallorquines d'en Jordi des Racó. In this tale, titled Na Dent d'or ("The Golden Tooth"), a rich lady has a beautiful daughter with golden teeth, whom she will only marry to a person who also has golden teeth. The girl rejects many suitors for they do not have golden teeth, and utters aloud she would marry even the Devil if he had golden teeth. The Devil (Barrufet) turns into a twenty-year-old youth and approaches the girl. Na Dent d'Or is surprised to find one such as herself and decides to marry the stranger. The tale then explains Na Dent d'Or's mother left the girl a magic horse of supernatural provenance, which always advised her. However, Na Dent d'Or did not consult with the magic horse before her accepting the stranger's marriage proposal. The magic horse admonishes the girl for her brash decision, and reveals the stranger is Barrufet, who will drag her to Hell. Na Dent d'Or is stunned by this information and berates herself for her rushed marriage plans, but the horse advises her how the can escape: Barrufet with come with a full marriage cortège, which are actually devils in disguise, but Na Dent d'Or is to tell them she will ride on the horse; they will seize the opportunity to gallop as hard and fast as they can, without looking behind them. The next day, Barrufet appears with a splendid carriage to carry his bride, but Na Dent d'Or says she will ride the horse. The girl and the horse gallop away as fast as they can to flee from the demons, who chase after them in their true forms. Na Dent d'Or invokes the holy names of the Father, the Son and the Holy Ghost, and the ground under the demonic pursuers opens up to swallow them, ending their threat for now. The duo reach a distant kingdom, and the horse advises Na Dent d'Or to buy a shepherd's garments and assume a male disguise. Na Dent d'Or does that and hires herself as a local king's new squire, to look after the stables. The new squire does a remarkable job the king and queen treat him like a son, but the prince suspects he is in fact a girl. The queen dismisses the notion, but gives suggestions on how to ascertain it: first, place a feathery pillow; if a girl, she will fluff the pillow; if male, he will simply lie on it. With the horse's help, Na Dent d'Or avoid being discovered. Next, the queen suggests they pass by the stores selling spinning implements and swords: if male, he will prefer the swords; if female, she will prefer the other. Again, the horse advises its mistress. Thirdly, they will sleep in the garden, with rabbits hidden near their beds; if female, she will complains about the animals; if male, he will pay no mind to the hounds. Lastly, the queen suspects there is a connection between the squire and the horse, and suggests the prince places a pearl necklace around a hound and let it loose after a rabbit, when the queen will say the horse is dead; if female, she will lament the fact; if male, he will simply join the prince in trying to capture the loose hound. The prince puts the queen's scheme in action: the squire joins the prince in capturing the loose hound and brings it to the palace, when the queen announces the horse died. Na Dent d'Or falls to the ground and laments the fact, thus proving she is woman, after all. Na Dent d'Or dismisses the male disguise and becomes a lady in the prince's court. The prince wants to marry her, and she consults with the horse. Both depart from the prince's castle to think the idea over, and the prince, despairing at her departure, goes after her. The horse and Na Dent d'Or transforms themselves to trick the prince: into a charcoal-maker and a coal furnace, then into a gardener and an orchard, and finally a church with bell tower and a priest. The prince is tricked by the transformations, but keeps chasing after her. At the last moment, the magic horse gallops in such a way a golden nail escapes from its hoof and hits the prince's tooth, replacing part of it with the nail's gold metal, thus making him one with "golden tooth". Na Dent d'Or ceases her flight and explains to the prince her mother wrote as her last will she was to marry a man with golden tooth such as herself, and now that the prince has a "golden tooth", they can be married. Thus they marry. Scholars Carme Oriol and Josep M. Pujol classified the tale, in the Catalan Index, as a combination of tale types: type 312C, "The Rescued Bride", and type 884, "The Forsaken Fiancée: Service as Menial", wherein the heroine disguises herself under a male disguise and works for a prince that suspects she is female.

In a Catalan language tale titled La Dent D'or, collected by Joan Amades, and translated to German as Goldzahn ("Goldtooth"), a young woman has a golden tooth. When her mother dies, she inherits her mother's horse to guide her, which is the soul of her grandfather, and an oath to only marry a man with golden tooth, lest misfortune follows her. However, the maiden begins to long for marriage, since no suitor she meets her golden tooth, and makes a wish to marry even the Devil himself. Thus, the Devil decides to marry the maiden, dons a human disguise with fake golden tooth, and goes to court the maiden. The maiden sees the fake suitor and decides to marry him at once, and goes to talk to the horse. The horse laments that the maiden is to marry the Devil himself, who will take the girl to Hell with him, so it asks the maiden why it did not consult it before agreeing to marry anyone. The maiden despairs at this revelation and asks the horse what she can do. The horse advises her that she is to avoid entering the Devil's bridal carriage, since it is made of fire; instead, she is to ask to ride on the little horse on the way to her bridegroom's house. The following morning, the Devil arrives with a procession of carriages and bedecked guests - devils disguised as humans. The Devil invites the maiden to enter the carriage, but she chooses to ride her mother's horse instead. The horse gallops ahead of the devilish retinue and makes the sign of the cross with its hooves against the devilish retinue. After a while, the Devil realizes his bride escaped, suspects that the horse was sent from Heaven, and opens up the ground to take his retinue with him back to Hell. At a distance, the horse tells the maiden they escaped from the Devil, but they should be on the lookout, and suggests that she dons a male disguise. She trades her bridal dress with a shepherd's clothes and offers her services as a male servant. The local king listens to her offer and hires her for the palace. Goldtooth, as the false servant is called, becomes the king's best servant and the prince begins to suspect he is actually female. The queen dismisses the prince's words, until one day she suggests they set tests to their gender: first, throw an orange at them, if they catch with their legs open, they are female, and with their legs together, they are male; secondly, if they eat meat without a knife, drink from the jug without spilling a drop, and talk while eating, they are male; thirdly, pass by the street of the distaff-makers, and if they examine the distaffs, they are female; fourthly, walk in the garden, and if they begin to take an interest in the flowers, they are female; fifthly, have them sleep in the same room as the prince; lastly, have them take a bath together. With her horse's advice, she passes the test and hides her true identity. However, during the last test, a servant, jealous of Goldtooth, informs the prince about Goldtooth talking to their horse in the stables, so he should hide it and pretend that it died. It happens thus, and the prince sends for Goldtooth, saying that the horse is dead. Goldtooth lets out a wail and laments, but the prince is glad that his suspicions were correct. The prince tells Goldtooth he wants to marry her, and explains the horse is still alive. Goldtooth, her identity now disclosed, goes to talk to her horse, which says they have to escape, so they flee from the kingdom. The prince notices that his beloved has escaped, and consults with a fortune-teller about it, who bids him chase after her. The prince thus takes a horse and goes after Goldtooth. On the road, the horse and Goldtooth transform into other people to trick the prince: first, into a mound of charcoal (her) and a charcoal burner (the horse); next, into a mill (her) and a miller (the horse); lastly, into a vegetable garden (her) and a gardener (the horse). The prince is fooled by the transformations and returns home empty-handed. After consulting with the fortune-teller a final time, she bids him take the horse on a seven-day journey towards the sunrise, and catches up with Goldtooth. Her horse tells her its magic powers are gone, but it will trot the prince on his chin when he comes near them to bury all thoughts of marriage. The prince rides just behind Goldtooth, when her horse kicks the prince in the face with its golden-nailed hooves, causing a nail to stick in a gap between the prince's teeth, making it look like a golden tooth. The maiden feels sympathy for the prince and notices he has a golden tooth, just like her, as her mother once told her. Thus, the maiden and the prince marry. The tale was collected from informant Margarita Pol, from Palma. According to Romanist Felix Karlinger, the "material" is popular in the Western Mediterranean and found in Sicily, Sardinia, Southern France and Malta. Scholars Carme Oriol and Josep M. Pujol classified the tale, in the Catalan Index, as a combination of tale types: type 312C, "The Rescued Bride", and type 884, "The Forsaken Fiancée: Service as Menial", wherein the heroine disguises herself under a male disguise and works for a prince that suspects she is female. According to both scholars, Amades's tale was "based" on the tale collected by Alcover.

=== Basque Country ===
Author Wentworth Webster collected a Basque language tale named Zorria ("The Flea") from Saint-Jean-de-Luz, which was published by French linguist Julien Vinson with the title Le Pou ("The Flea"). In this tale, a king has three daughters. One day, his youngest daughter finds a flea in his hair. The king fattens the bug, kills it and uses its hide as part of a riddle for the princess's suitors. A gentleman wearing gold garments (the devil in disguise) guesses it right and is given the hand of the youngest princess, named Fifine, in marriage. Fifine goes to the stables and a white mare warns her that her suitor is the devil, and that, as parting gift, the princess must choose to take the mare with her. It happens so. On the road, the white mare trots the ground, and it commands the earth to swallow the devil for seven years. The mare's enchantment works, and Fifine is saved, but the animal advises her to dress in masculine clothes and go to another kingdom. In this new kingdom, Fifine and the white mare find shelter in a prince's castle. The prince tells his mother he had a dream their guest is a woman, and the queen advises him to test her: to make her choose guns and weapons at the market, to have her horse trample on a piece of linen, and to take a bath in the river. With the mare's help, Fifine passes the tests, but eventually reveals herself to the prince and marries him. The white mare gives Fifine a chirola, for her to use in extreme distress, and departs. Fifine and the prince live in relative peace and harmony for seven years, and she gives birth to a boy and a girl. One day, her husband has to go to war and leaves her with his mother. While he is away, the devil rises from the ground and meets Fifine and her children, and takes them to the forest. Fifine begs for him to grant her a last request, and she blows on the chirola. The white mare appears to her, stomps on the ground and the devil disappears for good. Fifine decides not to return to her mother-in-law's castle, so the mare gives her a magic cane for her to create a manor if she strikes the ground with it. Fifine's husband returns from war and, not seeing his family, looks for them in the forest. He finds the manor with Fifine and their children inside. Its mission accomplished, the white mare turns into a white dove and flies to Heaven. Webster presumed a French origin for the tale, due to the heroine's name (Fifine), and claimed that the tale was from "Laurentine, Sister of Toutou". The tale was also translated into English as Fifine and the White Mare and its second part, Fifine and the Prince, and both sourced from Gascony, France. Camarena and Chevalier cited Vison's tale in regards to their new Spanish tale type.

=== Portugal ===
Portuguese scholars Isabel Cárdigos and Paulo Jorge Correia locate a similar tale type in the Portuguese Folktale Catalogue, numbered 533A, Portuguese: Cavalo mágico salva noiva do Diabo, lit. 'Magic horse saves Bride from the Devil': the heroine marries a strange suitor, who turns out to be of evil nature; a horse takes her away in a magic flight to another kingdom, where she spends some time in male disguise; she reveals her identity and marries the prince; the prince goes to war; the heroine gives birth to her child and writes her husband a letter; the letters are falsified by the former suitor; the heroine escapes with her horse and the animal creates a new house for her and her child.

Portuguese author Trindade Coelho published the tale O Conto da Infeliz Desgraçada (English: Tale from Alentejo of an Unfortunate Wretch) in his book Os Meus Amores. In this tale, an old king asks his fifteen-year-old daughter to find a husband. The princess hears a voice telling her to marry only a man with ivory teeth, and the king summons every man, until the ivory-toothed man comes to marry her. When she prepares to leave her castle to go with her husband, the princess (named Isabel) hears another voice coming from the stables. She goes to check it and finds a "cardano" horse with black mane that tells her to take the horse with her, lest something evil befalls her. It is agreed on, and Isabel rides the horse. After some 200 days journey, her husband disappears from view, and the horse advises her to ride to a small cottage. Isabel does and finds two straws and a piece of paper inside it that she takes with herself. The husband appears behind her, and the horse tells her to drop the objects behind her: the paper to create a mist, the first straw, filled with needles, to create a forest, and the second straw, filled with water, to create a river between them. After safely escaping from the ivory-toothed man, the horse advises Isabel to dress in male clothing, and to go to another court, where she will pass her off as a youth named José. The second king tries to buy "José"'s horse, but he refuses. Later, after suspecting the newcomer is truly a woman, he plots with an old lady how to unmask her: to have her choose sits at the dining table, and to join him in his bedchambers. José passes the first test, but reveals her true identity in the king' room and marries him. Some years later, the king has to go to war and borrows Isabel's horse, while she stays at the palace and gives birth to two sons. A king's messenger takes a letter and runs to the battlefield to deliver it, but spends the night at an inn, where the innkeeper writes a false letter. The king receives the false letter and writes another, that is also forged by the innkeeper, with a command to banish her from the palace. Isabel receives the sad news and, despite bemoaning her fate, leaves the palace with her sons and wanders around the world. Suddenly, her cardano horse appears to her, having fled from the battlefield, and alerts her that her first bridegroom is after her, but the horse will do battle against him; after the horse perishes, Isabel is to get whatever she finds inside his mouth. It happens so: the princess takes the horse's tongue, throws it on the ground and a tower appears to house her and her children. Back to the king, he returns from war, learns about the forged letters, and decides to look for his wife. He stops by the same inn, and meets an old man that is also looking for her. Both decide to look for Isabel together and find her tower. They are welcomed inside, and, after dining with Isabel and her sons, she introduces her children to her father and her husband.

== See also ==
- The Horse Lurja (Georgian folktale)
- The Girl Soka and her Kind Horse
- Horse sacrifice
- Calumniated Wife
- The Three Golden Children (folklore)
- Vasilisa the Priest's Daughter
- Ileana Simziana (Romanian folktale)
- The Black Colt (Iranian folkale)
- The Magician's Horse (Lithuanian folktale)
