= The Horse Lurja =

Georgian folktale

The Horse Lurja (Georgian: ლურჯასი, romanized: Lurdzhasi; Russian: "Конь Лурджа", "Horse Lurja") is a Georgian folktale published by Georgian folklorist Mikhail Chikovani. It tells the story about the friendship between a princess and a magic horse, which sacrifices itself for her after it rescues her from great peril. Although the tale appears in Georgia, some scholars recognize similar narratives in Central Asia and across Europe.

== Summary ==
A king and a queen have a beautiful daughter. One day, an old witch tells the queen she and her husband can regain their youth if they kill their daughter and eat her liver and heart. The princess talks to her pet horse, Lurja, and confides in it about the murderous plan. The horse advises her to trick her parents: she is to ask the king and the queen to be dressed as a man and for her to take a ride on the horse to see the world before she dies.

It happens as the horse predicts and the princess seizes the opportunity to escape to another kingdom, in a male disguise. In this new kingdom, the king's son invites her to a hunt. The king's son suspects she is a girl, but his mother insists otherwise and tells him to test her: first by racing; then by going to the war treasury and choose what most appeals to a masculine mind.

The princess is eventually unmasked, but marries the king's son as she is. Her husband is invited as guest to another king, and borrows his wife's horse, Lurja. While he is away, she gives birth to a golden-haired son and writes a letter to him. A royal messenger takes the letter to deliver to the prince, but he spends the night in a house, where the contents of the letter are altered to say she gave birth to an abomination. The prince receives the letter and writes back that she and her son are to be kept safe until his return. The messenger passes by the same house, and the prince's letter is falsified with a command to burnt the princess and her son in an oven.

The horse Lurja senses that something is wrong with the princess and, despite one leg being tied to a pole, breaks free and races to the save the princess. He reaches the princess in the nick of time, on three legs, takes the princess and her son, and flies far away. At a safe distance, the horse realizes that being a three-legged beast is of no use to the princess, and urges her to kill it, place its three legs on three corners and its head in the middle. Reluctantly, she follows the horse's instructions and chants a spell; a temple is built in their place. The princess raises her son in this new place.

Meanwhile, the prince returns home and learns of the exchanged letters, and falls into despair, thinking that his wife and son were burnt in the oven. His father, the king, seeing his son's grief, decides to wander the world in search of his daughter-in-law and grandson. He eventually reaches the temple and meets his grandson and his mother.

== Analysis ==
=== Tale type ===
Georgian scholar T. Kurdovanitze identified a new tale type, not listed in the international Aarne-Thompson-Uther Index, which he termed "Красавица и ее конь" ("The Beauty and Her Horse"): a magical horse helps mother and son escape from burning and rides into the unknown with them; later, parts of its body (entrails, horsehide, etc.) transform into a castle to shelter mother and son, and her husband finds them.

This tale is classified by Georgian scholarship as an independent tale type in the Georgian Folktale Index, numbered -538*, "The Beauty and her Horse", with 12 variants listed.

=== Other regions ===
In a 2013 article, researcher Veronica Muskheli, from University of Washington, took notice of a cycle of stories that she located in Central Asia. In this narrative, which she named Woman's Magical Horse, the heroine rides her magical horse to escape from a great evil, usually wears masculine clothes, and eventually finds a husband. The horse eventually perishes after helping the heroine one last time and she uses the horse's remains to build a new home for her.

According to Basque researcher Koldo Biguri, Italian folklorist Sebastiano Lo Nigro located stories of the crossdressing heroine, her helpful horse and the flight from an unwanted monstruous suitor in Italy, Catalonia and Basque Country - which corresponds to Type C in Lo Nigro's study.

In a study about the European cycle of La Doncella Guerrera ("The Warrior Maiden"), French historian François Delpech identified a second form of the cycle, which he termed La fille qui a épousé le diable (English: "The girl who married the devil"). In this form, the crossdressing heroine is still put to the test of her gender, but she is helped by her faithful magic horse. Delpech also concluded that the heroine's horse is the one that rescues her from a terrible marriage with a supernatural being and sets her up with a beneficial human partner.

Haitian anthropologist Suzanne Comhaire-Sylvain studied an Haitian tale, titled Domangage with the heroine's marriage with a monstrous bridegroom and her escape with the help of a horse. She compared the Haitian tale with African stories and a Basque tale collected by Paul Vinson, concluding that they "share the same origin". Comhaire-Sylvain also mentioned a Turkish tale (Kamertag) collected by Kúnos, which would point to an Eastern origin for the story. Comhaire-Sylvain also concluded that the Haitian story is spread in America (in the Antilles, the United States and in Brazil), in Africa (in Senegal and Gabon) and in Western Europe (Basque Country), and supposed that the Haitian version was brought by Malinké, Wolof or Mpongwe slaves.

=== Motifs ===
According to scholarship, the Georgian word lurǯa means a 'blue-gray' color, or refers to a horse of dark gray colour.

According to Chilean folklorist Yolando Pino Saavedra, in some variants, the heroine is betrothed or already married to a gentleman (who is a devil in disguise), and escapes from him in a "Magical Flight" sequence. Despite the presence of the motif, these tales are not classified as type ATU 313, "The Magic Flight".

=== Relation to other tale types ===
In an article in Enzyklopädie des Märchens, narrative researcher Ines Köhler-Zülch stated that this narrative (heroine and magic horse save themselves from demonic bridegroom) may also start as tale type AaTh 621, "The Flea": her father, the king, fattens a louse and uses its hide as a suitor's riddle; a demonic bridegroom guesses it right.

Italian scholar Sebastian Lo Nigro, in his study, noted that the motif of the sequence of falsified letters harks back to tale type ATU 706, "The Maiden Without Hands".

== Variants ==
=== Europe ===
==== Georgia ====
In a Georgian tale titled Arcivis švili and translated into Russian as "Сын орла" ("Eagle Son") and into German as Der Sohn des Adlers, a king has no children, until one day his wife gives birth to an eagle. The king orders for a hole to be excavated and the eagle to be thrown down there. The eagle is fed with oxen, and devours the royal cattle in no time. The king announces that the populace is to feed the bird with their cattle or, lacking it, with humans. One day, an orphan girl is selected as the next sacrifice and goes to her mother's grave to weep over her fate. The mother's spirit appears to the girl and advises her: she is to dress in a buffalo hide and ask the eagle prince to take off its skin. The girl obeys the instructions and is roped down the hole in a buffalo skin. The eagle watches her intently and orders her to take off her skin, but the girl retorts that the eagle should take off his first. The eagle obeys and sheds the birdskin to become a youth of so great a beauty he illuminates the hole. Some servants of the king fail to hear any screams, and go to check: the girl is still alive, and a youth is there as well, with no trace of the eagle. The servants tell the king, who does not believe them and has them executed. Then, the goes to check for himself and confirms the servants' story. He marries his son, now human, to the girl, and gives her a magical horse. One day, the prince has to journey to another city, and borrows his wife's magical horse. While he is away, his wife gives birth to a golden-haired boy, and writes a letter the tell her husband the good news. A royal messenger is given the letter to deliver to the prince, but spends the night in a house. A woman that lives in the house writes that the princess gave birth to a puppy. The messenger delivers the false letter, and the prince writes that she is to be protected until his return. The same messenger spends the night again at the same house, and the same woman takes the true letter and falsifies it with a command to take the princess and her son and burn them in an oven. The princess and her son are put in a chest and taken to the oven. However, her magical horse rushes to her, takes the chest out of the oven and rides with it to another land. The horse arrives at a desert and bursts open the chest, releasing mother and son. With no more strength, the horse tells the princess she can use its tail as a whip, so that, with every crack of the whip on the ground, the desert can be filled with flowers. The horse dies, and the princess follows the horse's instructions. Mother and son live out their days in this new land, and the boy grows up as a fine hunter. The tale then segues into tale type ATU 315, "The Faithless Mother".

In a Georgian tale collected in Kakheti and translated as "Сказ о Мзе-хатун" ("Tale of Mze-Khatun"), a king, in his old age, has a daughter. One day, he takes her to a plantain tree in his garden and says her name shall be Mze-Khatun, and that no one shall know her name, save for the one who does, to whom he will give her in marriage. Mze-Khatun grows up as a beautiful golden-haired princess, and many try their hand in gaining her hand in marriage by guessing her name, to no avail. However, the Devil dons a disguise as an old man and asks for three days to guess the girl's name right. The king will soon be forced to give her to the Devil, and she goes to cry with the horses in the stables. Suddenly, a lame horse begins to talk and asks her to find it a knife, a comb, and a jar of vinegar. Mze-Khatun takes the items and escapes on the horse, while the Devil gives her name to the king and hopes to find her, but she has fled. The Devil goes after her and the horse tells Mze-Khatun to throw the object to hinder the pursuit: the knife creates mountains, the comb a deep forest, and the jar a vast sea. The horse loses the Devil and takes Mze-Khatun to the kingdom of the King of the Orient, where she takes a male disguise to mingle with the locals. The son of the local king suspects the newcomer is female, talks to his mother about it, and decides to take him on a hunt. During the hunt, Mze-Khatun rides the horse and captures the animals, to the local prince's anger, who throws a saber at her cap. The horse takes her to a cliffside, then advises her to take the saber and fight the prince and his retinue twice, but surrender on the third time, since he is her destiny. It happens thus, and Mze-Khatun reveals her gender to the prince and marries him. A year later, war breaks out between the King of the Occident and the King of the Orient, and the king of the Orient sends his son in his stead to fight in the war. The prince asks Mze-Khatun if he can take her lame horse. The horse advises its mistress's husband against it, due to Mze-Khatun's foe, but since the prince takes it, the equine warns him to release it immediately if he finds it restless. After he is away, Mze-Khatun gives birth to a golden-haired boy and sends a letter to her husband, but the Devil intercepts it and writes that she gave birth to a frog-snake. The prince reads the false letter and writes a command to take her of both until he returns, but the devil falsifies the second letter with an order to throw mother and son in an oven. Mze-Khatun's parents-in-law think the order must be a mistake, but prepare the oven and let Mze-Khatun and her son walk towards, although they dare not burn them. Suddenly, the Devil comes out of the sea and tries to convince the king and the queen to burn mother and son, then offers to throw them himself, when Mze-Khatun's horse appears still in fetters, shove the Devil inside the oven and escapes with its mistress and son to somewhere else in the steppes. After it stops, the horse tells Mze-Khatun it will die, but bids her skin its flesh, cut its body apart and spread the remains around, then hide herself inside its skin. Mze-Khatun does as the horse instructed, and in the morning finds herself in a large palace inside a city created from the horse's remains, with flowing river. Mze-Khatun is crowned the queen of the city, builds an inn and asks for her portrait to be hung at its door and for anyone that sighs over it is to be brought to her presence. Back to her husband, the prince learns that Mze-Khatun and her son are missing and goes after them. He reaches the city that mysteriously appeared in the steppe overnight, and sighs before her portrait in the inn. The guards bring the prince to their queen, Mze-Khatun, and they reunite.

In a tale from the Mingrelian people, collected by Sh. Lominadze with the Russian title "Мохнатый жеребенокъ" ("Shaggy Foal"), a tsar has a daughter. One day, a devi appears, threatens the kingdom and demands the princess as his bride. The princess agrees to marry the devi and is asked to say goodbye to everyone in the kingdom. She goes to the stables and meets a shaggy horse, which asks to be taken as her mount, for it will save her from trouble. The princess departs with a wedding retinue of thirty men, followed by the devi. At some points in the journey, the devi begins to devour members of the retinue until there are only the princess and the horse left. The horse looks behind them and, sensing the danger, asks the princess to be whipped seven times, so that they can gallop away from the devi. At first, the horse's stratagem works, until they sight the devi behind and the horse asks for the princess to throw some objects behind them to deter the devi: a comb creates a forest, a tuft of the horse's mane creates a mountain, and another creates a vast sea between them, ceasing the pursuit for now. The princess reaches another kingdom, and her horse provides with a breath from its nostrils male garments, swords and daggers for her. The princess dons the male clothes and meets a handsome prince who is on a hunt. They become friends, and the prince suspects his new companion is a woman. Following her horse's advice, the princess reveals her gender and marries the prince. Years later, the prince departs on a mission and borrows his wife's foal, while the princess gives birth to a son. The prince's family sends a falcon with an attached letter to inform the prince, which is intercepted and falsified by the devi, who attracts the falcon with a slab of meat. The devi falsifies a series of letters to tell the princess gave birth to puppies and that the prince ordered her to be cast in a barrel and burned to death. The devi goes to the prince's parents and reiterates the false order. The princess and her son are walked to their fiery execution, when her shaggy foal, which realized the danger she was in, rushes to its mistress to rescue her: it trots down the devi into the fire and takes the princess and her son to another land. Once there, the foal says it is close to death, and tells the princess to use its body parts: remove its skin, slice it and spread all over the open field to create a fence; grind its bones and spread the dust all over the field for houses to appear; place its skull in the middle for a palace to appear; slice its flesh and toss some pieces around for subjects to appear for her to rule over. With its last breath, the horse dies, and the princess follows its instructions: the next day, a city and a palace emerge from the horse's remains, and the city becomes known as "blagodatnago". As for the prince, he returns home and learns of the false letter, killing his parents in a fit of rage. He decides to repent by becoming a beggar and begging for alms. One day, he reaches the princess's city and knocks at the door. The princess welcomes him in and shows him his son, then explains the whole story. The prince reunites with his wife and son, but laments the fact he killed his own parents.

==== Romania ====
Arthur Carl Victor Schott and Albert Schott collected a similar Romanian tale from Banat with the title Die Kaiserstochter und das Füllen ("The Kaiser's Daughter and the Foal"). A foal is born at the same day as a human princess. Both foal and princess become friends and companions. She feeds the horse with fire and wine. When she is 15 years old, her father, the emperor, decides it is time for her to marry, and sets a riddle for any suitors: he covers a drum with the skin of two fleas, and whoever guesses it right shall have the princess as wife. Many try, to no avail, until a powerful and wicked dragon, adept at magic arts, guesses it is made of louseskin (tale type ATU 857, "The Louseskin"). The princess confides in her pet horse about the horrible husband-to-be, but the horse advises her to ask her father to make three maale garments. The princess dress in male clothes and rides the horse to regions unknown, when she sees that the dragon is after her. The horse asks her what speed it should ride to elude the dragon: the speed of thought or the speed of wind, and the princess answers every time the dragon is near. After they elude their pursuer, the princess arrives at a new realm, and the horse gives her a magic cushion to press whenever she feels she needs its help. In this new city, the princess offers her services to the emperor who rules the city, an old friend of her father, and gains his trust over time. And so rumours begin to spread among the emperor's advisers, who convince the emperor his new friend is an impostor, and a woman in man's garb. The emperor decides to test this theory - and the newcomer - by having his son accompany the youth to the marketplace (if he is a man, he will want to look at weaponry) and to the royal vineyard (if he is a man, he will eat the grapes raw). With her horse's advice, she avoids falling in their trap. However, as a third test, she is to get a bride for emperor: a princess locked in a glass castle on a glass hill, captive of a powerful wizard. The princess brings the maiden to the emperor and reveals them the whole truth. The emperor decides to marry his son to the princess, in the name of the friendship between him and the girl's father. Some time later, war breaks out, and the emperor sends his son to fight. While he is away at war, his wife, the princess, gives birth to two golden boys. The royal messenger rushes to the battlefield to give a letter with the good news, and spends the night in an inn. A sequence of false letters leads the princess and her twin boys to be burned at the stake. The executioners lead the mother and children to the stake, and she presses the cushion she had with her. The magical horse rushes to her and inhales the fire to put it out. The princess sits on the horse with her children, and departs to regions unknown. At a safe distance, the horse tells her its time is at an end, and advises her that, after he dies, for her to cut his belly and spread its entrails to the four corners, its heart in the middle, and for her to sleep in its skin. The princess follows the horse's instructions and, the next day, a palace appears, with two lions as guards in front of the castle. Meanwhile, her husband goes back home, but does not find neither his wife, nor his children. Falling into a deep grief for the following years, the prince travels a bit, and sends a servant to find lodge for them. The messenger returns and points to a grand palace nearby, with two lions guarding it. The prince and his retinue go to the palace and find the mistress of the castle: his wife.

==== Moldova ====
Author and folklorist Grigore Botezatu published a Moldavian tale titled Carminea (in the original, "Кырмыза" or Kyrmyza). In this tale, the titular Carminea is the beautiful daughter of a landlord. When she is 17 years old, her father places her daughter on a tower, and erects a staircase made of glass and precious stones, and sets a test for her suitors: they are to ride on horseback, jump high and get her ring from her hand. Many try, but a dragon riding a lion fulfills the test. Her father invites everyone to the betrothal party, but Carminea retires to the stables to confide in her pet horse Gaitan. The horse advises her to get rid of her unwanted suitor. The next day, the dragon suitor rides the lion, while Carminea lags behind. Following the horse's instructions, she decapitates the dragon in a surprise attack. She rides to a distant village and dresses up as a male rider to maintain the charade. A man named John befriends her and suspects she is a girl, so his grandmother advises him to put her through some tests: racing, finding use for the sticks in a cart, choosing between swords and yarns; and stepping on a besom placed in the doorway. Carminea passes through the first three tests, but is unmasked in the fourth one. She reveals her identity to John and they marry. However, John is drafted to war and joins the fray. After some time, Carminea is pregnant, and John writes home. He gives a letter to a friend to deliver it, and John's friends spends a night in a house - the house of the mother of the dead dragon suitor. She writes false command on the letter to burn Carminea at the stake. Gaitan tells her what to do: walk to her execution, then ride Gaitan into the fire, get a kerchief from its right ear and toss it in the fire. Carminea and Gaitan ride away to a valley near a spring. Carminea senses she is in labour, and Gaitan announces his time is over. Carminea sleeps, and the next morning awakes inside a great castle. The story then explains that parts the horse became parts of the castle: the body became the castle, the head became a table with dishes, its ears and eyes became two wolf hounds that guard the castle, the mane became a beautiful orchard, and one of its hooves turned into an old maidservant that helps Carminea in rearing her two golden-haired sons.

==== Kalmyk people ====
In a tale from the Kalmyk people with the title "О девушке, ставшей царицей, и о ее одиннадцати сыновьях" ("About the Girl who became a queen and her 11 sons"), girl Badma wears feminine clothes at home, but disguises herself as a youth when grazing with the herd. One day, a creature named mus breaks into her house and devours her parents, but she escapes with the help of a horse. Now orphan, she employs herself to a local khan still disguised as male, but the khan tries to reveal her female identity. After some attempts, her magical horse convinces her to tell her story to the khan, who falls in love with Badma. The khan expels his previous 500 Shulma wives and marries the girl. The next year, war erupts, and the khan departs with his wife's magical horse to fight, while she stays and gives birth to eleven sons with golden breast and silver backside. The previous Shulma wives intercept a letter and falsify it to tell the khan his wife gave birth to 11 puppies. The khan orders Badma and her elder son to be cast into the sea in a barrel. Their barrel washes ashore on an island. Badma's magical horse finds its rider and, to help her, the horse begs to be sacrificed and its remains to be distributed nearby (its tail under the roof, bury its legs in the direction of the four winds and enter its body). Saddened, they follow through with the instructions, and wake up in a white, carpeted kibitka with an apple tree yielding eleven fruits, a khubuk (well) with golden frame, and herds of cattle grazing about. Later, the elder son shapeshifts into a sparrow to spy on his father's court, where the previous 500 Shulma wives comment on strange wonders: a beautiful woman named Ulan that comes out of the water, and on a certain beach 10 youths with golden breast and silver backside come out of the sea to eat food on their golden plates.

In a Kalmyk tale titled Köwün baädltä küükn, translated to German as Das Mädchen, das einem Jungen ähnelte ("The Girl that Resembled a Youth"), an old couple have a daughter and a horse herd in the steppe. Their daughter dons male clothes to herd their horses on her yellow-speckled mount. One day, the horse whinnies, alerting the family of a danger: a one-eyed yellow giant is coming. The girl tries to escape with her parents on her lap, but the horse trips and lets both people go, allowing the giant to devour them. The girl returns home, dons the male disguise and herds her horses through the steppes until they reach and mingle with the khan's herd. The girl works in horse herding for a while, until the royal horse herder informs the khan of the newcomer and his suspicions about them being a girl, not a boy. Thus, the khan takes the new horse herder on some activities to unmask her, like hare hunting, swimming on a lake, and drinking a heavy drink of arsa and borsa, but with her horse's help, she prevails. However, the horse becomes inebriated with the drink and she takes it to drink some water. The horse advises her to reveal herself to the khan. It happens thus, and the girl marries the khan, who expels his previous 500 Shulmas-witches wives to a cave. Some time later, war breaks out, and the khan is advised to take his wife's yellow-speckled horse as a mount, leaving her unprotected. While he is away, the new queen gives birth to eleven sons with golden chests and silver heads and writes her husband a letter telling of the good news. The Shulma-witches intercept the letters and falsify a sequence of them to tell the khan she gave birth to eleven black monsters and that the children are to be thrown in the sea and the queen and her elder son to be cast in a barrel with provisions. It happens thus, and the family is separated, with the boys swimming in the ocean and mother and son washing ashore on an island, where they built a hut. Back to the khan, his wife's horse is growing ill, when it drinks some water, rolls in the grass and gallops away to meet its mistress on the island. After spending some time with its original rider, the horse bids her to kill it, place its lungs and heart together, cut its head and bury it in front of the house, bury its legs in the four corners of a house, and its tail behind it. The queen follows the horse's instructions and mother and son appear inside a large palace with their own servants, a monastery in front of the palace, a golden well with silver bottom behind it and four types of cattle (originated from the legs) grazing about. Back to the khan, after losing his wife and horse, he returns home and retakes his 500 Shulma-witch wives, then sends two emissaries to travel around and bring news to him. The two emissaries travel to the island where mother and son live, then return to the khan's court to report, the khan's elder son trailing behind them in the shape of a sparrow. The emissaries report back to the khan of the marvels they saw, but the 500 Shulma wives dismiss their information and boast about even greater marvels: first, a herd of eleven pigs that spit gold and live beyond two horizons, in Heaven; secondly, about a herd of eleven black horses with manes of coral and tails of pearl that live in Heaven; thirdly, about a maiden named Ulan who lives in a cave in the middle of the ocean, owns a golden boat and a golden oar and sings songs on the shore; and finally about ten boys with golden chests and silver heads who come ashore to eat food that falls from Heaven on their golden bowls with silver spoons. Each time, the khan's elder son captures the marvels (drugging and kidnapping Ulan) and brings them to his island home. For the last one, he prepaes some chursn cheese with his mother's milk and goes to the shore where his brothers appear. The brothers recognize their mother's milk and reunite with their brother, and the eleven siblings return to their mother's island.

==== Poland ====
Philologist and folklorist Julian Krzyżanowski, establisher of the Polish Folktale Catalogue according to the international index, located a similar narrative in Poland, which he dubbed type T 706A, "Królewna i źrebię" ("Princess and the Foal"). In the Polish tale, collected by folklorist Oskar Kolberg in Baranowa (Lubelskie) with the title Cudowne źrebię ("The Magical Foal"), a king has a beautiful daughter. He sets a test for any suitors (though many have failed and died): if anyone guesses the princess's name, they shall have the princess as bride. One day, the princess mutters to herself her own name (Marcybelo), which is heard by an evil spirit. The evil spirit disguises himself as a rich suitor and wins the princess as his bride. Before the princess leaves, she has a dream about a herd of horses just outside of the castle. Her dream is real, and one of the little foals of the herd follows the princess to her room. The foal warns the princess that her suitor is an evil spirit, and concocts a plan with her: when she is in the carriage on the way to the church, she shall sit on the right side and jump onto the foal. It happens so and she rides the horse to another castle, and jumps over a wall to a prince's garden. The gardener sees her and informs the prince, who takes her as his wife. The princess is taken to a summer palace to be more at ease, and gives birth to male twins. Her mother-in-law writes her son a letter about the good news, but the letters are intercepted and falsified by the evil spirit. The prince's mother reads the forged letter and carries out the false orders: the princess and her two children are to be burnt in a pyre. As she is led to her execution, the foal (which was locked in the stables) hurries to its master and whisks her away to safety. At a safe distance, on a vast meadow, the foal begs the princess to kill it, use its head to build a well and its ribs a city. The princess names the city "Marcybelin". Not long after, the prince, her husband, learns of the situation and goes to look for her with iron shoes and an iron cane.

==== Italy ====
Folklorist Domenico Comparetti collected a tale titled Il drago ("The Dragon") from Pisa, which was later published by author Italo Calvino with the title The Dragon and the Enchanted Filly (Italian: Il Drago e la cavallina fatata). In this tale, a childless king and queen pray to God for a son until they are expecting one. After the prince's birth, an astrologer predicts he will marry by his twentieth year and kill his wife, otherwise he will turn into a dragon. The royal couple become gravely worried about their son's future, but he lives out his days until he is 20 years old, when they arrange a marriage between him and the queen of England. The queen of England, however, has a magical talking filly who tells the queen about her betrothed's fate, and plots with her to have her ride on horseback to church. Following the filly's instructions, the queen rides to church and holds tight to the horse's neck; they ride like lightning away from the prince who, just as foretold, becomes a dragon. Back to the queen, the filly advises her to trade her royal clothes with a farmer, and to work as a stableboy in a nearby kingdom. The queen obeys. In this second kingdom, the king's son suspects the new stableboy is a female, and sets some tests to prove his gender: to have him make a bouquet of flowers, to cut the bread a certain way, and to practice fence with him. With the filly's advice, the queen of England avoids revealing her gender, but she does anyway and marries the king's son. After a while, war breaks out, and the king's son borrows the queen of England's filly as his mount. Before they depart, the filly gives the queen three hairs of its mane to use in an emergency. While the king's son is away at war, the queen gives birth to "beautiful" twins, and writes her husband a letter. The messenger, however, is intercepted by the now draconic prince, who falsifies a sequence of letters that culminates with the queen and her children being ordered to be burned at a pyre. The queen's mother-in-law decides to spare them and sets them adrift on a boat with provisions, while they burn dummies in the pyre. Now adrift at sea, the dragon is ready to attack the queen of England and her children, but she breaks out each of the filly's three hairs to create magic obstacles: first, a thicket, then a wide river, and lastly a mighty fire, but the dragon goes through each one. To the queen's relief, her friend, the filly, appears in the nick of time to battle to the dragon to the death: the dragon dies, but so does the filly. The queen cries over her dead friend, but notices that a castle appeared nearby. A woman at a window signs the queen to enter it, and welcomes her, saying she is the filly, but now her enchantment was over since she killed the dragon. Back to the king's son, he returns from war and learns of the false letters, and decides to sail the seas until he finds his wife. He sails to the shore where he sees the dead bodies of the dragon and the filly, and the castle in the distance, where he reunited with his family.

==== Mari people ====
Scholar S. S. Sabitov located a similar narrative in the "Catalogue of Tales of Magic from the Mari people", indexed as a single entry of type 621, "Шкура вши" ("Louseskin)": a king sets a riddle for suitors to guess the material of the louseskin; the devil guesses it right and gains the princess as his bride, but she escapes with the help of a horse to another kingdom, where she marries a human prince.

==== Lithuania ====
In a Lithuanian tale collected from an Ožkabaliai source in 1905 and titled Apė karaliūnaitę ir raganą ("About the princess and the witch"), a king has no children, until, years later, he has a daughter, and a mare in the stables gives birth to a foal. The princess and the foal become friends and spend their time together. When she becomes of age, the king chooses her a suitor against her wishes. Sensing the princess's dismay, the foal tells her they can escape together. During the wedding, the princess takes a ride on the horse; the animal flies away and reaches a distant kingdom, where a king who is single lives with his mother, a witch. The monarch goes to meet the stranger, who introduces herself as Pana, and marries her. Some time later, the king leaves home, and Pana gives birth to a son. The queen mother, the witch, falsifies a series of letters to tell the king Pana gave birth to an animal, and to write a false order to burn her and the son at the stake. As a last request, Pana asks for her horse to be brought to her. The horse is brought by some soldiers, kicks the witch mother into the fire and escapes with Pana and her son to yet another kingdom. When they land, the horse asks Pana to kill it and place its heart on the ground, for a fountain to appear that can cure all diseases. Despite some reluctance, Pana sacrifices her horse, and sleeps on the ground; when she wakes up, she finds herself on a large bed, with servants and the magical spring near them. Back to Pana's husband, hurt by grief, he wanders the world and reaches Pana's kingdom, whom he does not recognize. Pana invites her husband for a meal, and he recognizes his ring on her finger. They reunite.

=== Asia ===
In their commentaries to the tales collected by the Grimm Brothers, European scholars Johannes Bolte and Jiri Polívka noted similarities between Turkish tale Kamer-Taj, der Mondross and Kyrgyz (sic) tale Dudar Kys, and the connection between both stories to the German tale Die Mädchen ohne Hände ("The Maiden Without Hands").

==== Turkey ====
Folklorist Ignác Kúnos published a similar tale from Turkey, with the title A hold-paripa, translated as Kamer-Taj, der Mondross, or the Moon-Horse. In this tale, a padishah fattens a flea for it to grow large, skins it and uses its leather as part of a riddle: whoever guesses it right, shall marry his daughter. A dev guesses it right and takes the padishah's daughter as his bride. The padishah's daughter mounts on her father's horse, Kamer-Taj or Moon-Horse, and it rides with the girl to a garden in a palace in another island. The prince who lives in this palace sees the horse and the princess and mistakes her for a peri. The girl explains she escaped from a horrible mistake of a wedding, and marries the prince. Some time later, war breaks out, and the prince goes in his father's stead. While the prince is away at war, his wife gives birth to a boy and a girl, but a sequence of forged letters by the dew threatens to destroy the girl and her children. After reading the false letters, the princess leaves the palace with her children. Lost in the world, the dew finds her and tries to kill her children. The princess cries out for her horse Kamer-Taj to help her, and the horse races to its mistress. Kamer-Taj takes them as far away as possible, to his own country. With no more strength in his body, Kamer-Taj asks the girl to use its head and entrails to magically build a palace for her and her children. In a monograph published posthumously, French comparativist Emmanuel Cosquin compared the Basque tale Le Pou with the Turkish Kamer-tag (sic) and concluded, based on the great parallels of both tales, that their relationship was "incontestable" ("indubitable", in the original).

==== Kurdish people ====
Kurdologists Ordîxanê Jalîl, Celîlê Celîl and Zine Jalil collected a similar story from the Kurdish people. In this tale, titled "Зэльфиназ и Джэльфифараз" ("Zelfinaz and Jelfifaraz"), a padishah laments that he has neither a son, nor a daughter. A dervish appears and gives him an apple: half to be given to his wife, and half to his mare, so that a daughter and a foal are born at the same time, and they are only to be named in his presence. The padishah agrees with the man's terms and takes the apple. Some time later, a girl is born to him, and a foal to his mare. When she is of age, the old man appears again and names the girl Zelfinaz and the horse Jelfifaraz, and asks the padishah to not reveal their names, but to give his daughter along with the horse to anyone who can guess their names. A dev learns of this, and sends his grayhound to spy on the princess and gather information. The grayhound comes back with the correct names, and the dev appears in court to answer the riddle. He guesses them correctly and takes the princess as his wife and her horse with him. Zelfinaz is given masculine clothes, and the horse - whom she calls "her brother" - hatches a plan with her: they will trick the dev, hit him and escape. It happens so: Jelfifaraz takes Zelfinaz to another king's palace, where she, in a man's garments, becomes the companion of the prince. The prince and his mother argue about whether or not his newfound companion is a woman, and she sets tests for "him": to drink wine and not get drunk, and to sleep on a branch of roses. With her horse's advice, she passes on both tests, but fails when she is put to the drinking test again: she is taken by the king's son to her chambers and undresses; the king's son realizes she is a girl, and sleeps by her side. The next morning, Zelfinaz wakes up and goes to see her "brother", the horse, and apologizes for not talking to him the night before. The horse assuages her fears and tells her she has found her happiness. Time passes, and Zelfinaz marries the king's son. One day, her husband wants to go to the hajj and take Jelfifaraz with him. Despite some reservations, Zelfinaz agrees to let her husband take the horse with him. While he is away, she gives birth to two golden-haired sons, and her mother-in-law writes the prince a letter with the good news. However, the spurned dev strikes again, and forges a series of letters that cause Zelfinaz's exile with her children: she is given provisions for 40 days and nights, and put on a boat. She reaches a shore and laments her fate. Her brother, the horse, appears to her, and tells her to sacrifice him: cut open his insides and scatter them to create a garden, then clean his body and enter inside with her children. Jelfifaraz perishes, and Zelfinaz follows his orders. The next day, she wakes up in a palace. Safe for now, she raises her twin sons. Meanwhile, back to the prince, he learns of the false letters and begins a journey to find Zelfinaz. He takes a boat and sails the waters, until he reaches the same shore and finds Zelfinaz's palace, with their children inside.

==== Turkestan ====
Orientalist Nikolai Ostroumov translated a similar tale into Russian with the title "Царская дочь и Див" ("The Tsar's Daughter and the Div"), which he sourced from the Sarts. In this tale, a king has a daughter and makes a suitor riddle for whoever wants to marry her: he fattens a louse, kills it and extends its skin, so people have to guess what material it is made of. A div spies on some servants gossiping about the secret and learns the answer, then wins the princess for himself. The princess is given to him, but, before she leaves, her magic talking horse advises her to take the horse with her and some objects (a mirror, a comb, salt, and a "kalyampur-munchak", which is a type of fragrant flower). She rides the horse to the dev's cave, where there are bones of the dev's victims, then makes a turn for it and escapes on it. The dev chases after them, but the horse advises her to throw the objects behind to stop him: the flower creates a field of thorns, the salt a sea of sand and salt, the comb a large mountain, and the mirror a river between them. Safe for now on the other side of the river, the princess finds shelter with an old couple. Some time later, a local king discovers her and marries her, paying a bride price to the old couple. One day, the king wants to take her horse on a hunt, but she does not wish to part with it. The animal gives some of its hairs to her, and leaves with the king. Meanwhile, back to the div, he survives the river crossing and reaches the princess's kingdom. When she gives birth to twin sons, a messenger is tasked with taking a letter to the king. The dev intercepts the letters and falsifies them to write a command to expel the princess and her children on a donkey, then set them away from the kingdom. The false orders are carried out, and the princess leaves the kingdom on the donkey. On her exile, the div finds her and threatens to devour her and her children, but the princess tricks him into getting the proper materials to cook them, like firewood. While the div is busy collecting firewood, the princess burns the horse's hair and it appears immediately to help her. The horse and the div engage in battle, the horse winning, but it tells the princess to kill it, throw its head on one side, its legs on the four directions, spread its entrails, and sleep with her children inside its ribs. The princess refuses to do it at first, but goes through with it. The next morning, the legs become poplar trees with emerald ribs, the ribcage a golden palace, the entrails a garden, and the head a large stream. German-Bohemian folklorist Gustav Jungbauer translated the tale into German as Der Zauberross ("The Magic Horse"), sourcing it from Turkestan. In his commentaries, Jungbauer noted that this tale resembled both the Turkish Kamer-Taj and Kazakh Dudar-Kyz. Psychologist Marie-Louise von Franz sourced the tale The Magic Horse from Uzbekistan.

==== Kumyk people ====
In a tale from the Kumyks, collected in Dagestan with the Kumyk title "Къара атлы къыз" (transliteration: "Kara atly kyz"; Russian: Девушка на вороном коне, romanized: Devushka na voronom kone, lit. 'The girl on the (raven-)black horse'), a dervish gives an apple to a childless couple, whose half is to be given to the wife, while the other is eaten by a mare in the stables. The heroine is born, also a black horse, and they become friends. At a certain point of the tale, she marries and gives birth to twin children, a boy with golden locks and a girl with a moon on the forehead. Some time later, she is forced to flee for her life, and rides away on her horse to another land. After the flight, the horse says it can help her one last time: he advises her to kill it, skin its body, take its tail and draw a large circle on the ground with it, then cover herself with its skin in the center of the circle and sleep. The heroine follows its orders and sleeps in the horseskin. The next morning, she sees that a palace has appeared overnight, with a lush and beautiful garden filled with animals, and inside the palace, her children are sleeping on a golden bed, and many servants are waiting at her beck and call.

==== Buryat people ====
A similar narrative was collected from the Buryat, collected from a 62-year-old-teller in 1978, in the then Mongolian People's Republic, with the title "Девушка и говорящий бархатисто-черный конь" or "Хэли мэдэдэг хэлин х хара моритой басаган" ("The Girl and her talking silky black horse"). In this tale, a maiden lives with her parents, who are visited by a man named Badarchi Lama. He convinces the girl's parents to expel her from home, under the pretense that she is an evil spirit. The maiden is helped by a talking horse and escapes before her parents do anything to her. With the horse's help, she competes in a male-only tournament (a ploy by the khan to unmask his prophecised daughter-in-law). As the tale continues, the virago maiden gives birth to a boy with golden breast and silver backside, and her husband takes her magical horse to help him in a war. The same Badarchi Lama intercepts the royal mail and falsifies a letter with an order to dig a hole and bury queen and son inside it. They carry out the order, but the magical black horse, back from the war, rescues them out of the pit and escapes with both to the distant mountains. Now at a safe distance, the horse tells them it is about to expire, and asks the girl to use its remains to build them a house: place its four legs on the four cardinal points to create four sandalwood trees, place its head in the middle to create crystal, spread its skin on the ground and sleep on its body. The next day, four sandalwood trees appear, and she climbs one, just as the sholmos (the evil priest) appears with an axe to fell the tree the girl and her son are on. After he tries a bit, a wolf agrees to help him, and the sholmos rests for a bit. The wolf flees with the axe, and the sholmos spews another from his mouth. The second time, a red fox offers to take the sholmos's place in felling the tree, but the animal also escapes. The third time, the sholmos cuts down the third sandalwood tree, and mother and son move out to the fourth and last one. While waiting on the treetop, two dogs come to their rescue: they dig out a hole in the ground and fill it water, saying that red and white foam will pool at the surface; if it is red foam, the dogs have been defeated. The canines drag the sholmos to the hole, kill him, and jump out of the hole, telling the girl and her son they are free to live. Finally, the girl's husband returns home and learns of the exchanged letters, and sends emissaries to the four corners of the earth to find her. The emissaries find the girl in the mountains, but she refuses to return, due to the false orders being carried out. Her father-in-law and her husband go in person to solve the misunderstanding and everybody goes back home.

==== Mongolia ====
Hungarian orientalist László L. Lőrincz established the classification of the Mongolian tale corpus, published as Mongolische Märchentypus ("MMT"). In his system, he indexed two similar tales. In the first one, termed 112, Der Dämon will ein Mädchen rauben ("The Demon Wants to Kidnap a Maiden"): the magic horse discerns that a demon wants to kidnap and devour the maiden; the heroine escapes on the magic horse and throws objects behind her to deter the demonic pursuer, then reaches another kingdom where she marries the local khan; the heroine gives birth to a son and the demon tries to capture her, but hounds that emerge from the magic horse destroy it; the heroine reunites with her human husband. In the second one, numbered 170, Das Fohlen der Stute, die gewöhnlich keine Fohlen warf ("The Foal from a Mare that did not foal"): a mare gives birth to a foal; later, it rescues its mistress (the heroine) from a demon and takes her to another kingdom where she marries a khan; the heroine ties her foal to iron fetters, despite its warning, and it perishes; out of the foal's body, obstacles appear to protect the heroine from the demon, including two hounds that tear him apart; at the end of the tale, the khan finds the heroine and their son.

In a Mongolian tale titled "ЭЗЭНДЭЭ ҮНЭНЧ МОРЬ" ("The Horse Faithful to its Mistress") and translated to Russian as "Жеребёнок-спаситель" ("The Saviour Colt"), an old couple have a beautiful daughter. They also have a mare with no foal, and a tree with no fruit. One day, the old man sees that the mare has foaled and the tree yielded fruit. His daughter wants to see the foal, but her father tells her to see it tomorrow. In the middle of the night, the daughter sneaks out to see the foal, which is of a bay colour, and eats the fruits from the tree. Suddenly, the horse talks to her and says the mangas will come in the night, and they should escape. The daughter agrees and takes with her a comb and a whetstone, as per the horse's instructions. She rides the horse and accidentally drops the comb to create a sea of boiling water in front of them. The horse jumps over the sea and tells her to throw the whetstone behind them. Eventually, they reach another kingdom. The horse explains that, in this kingdom, the khan and the khansha are looking for a bride for their son. The horse suggests that she will become the wife of the khan's son, and reminds her to not allow her husband to ride it, nor fetter it with iron chains. The girl marries the khan's son. One day, the girl is pregnant, and the khan's son has to depart on a three year journey. He and asks if he can borrow her horse. She agrees to lend the horse to her husband, but asks him to not put the horse in iron fetters. While he is away, she gives birth to a son, and writes her husband a letter. The letter is intercepted by the mangas. The horse races back to the girl and her son, and tells her to mount him, for the mangas are coming for her. The horse races to the middle of the vast steppe, and tells the girl he will soon perish. However, she can use his four legs to create four aspens (one of gold, one of silver, one of pearls and one of coral), and his body to create a sea. The horse also gives her four golden hairs of its mane. After the horse dies, the girl uses its legs and body to create an island in the middle of a sea, with four aspens. She climbs up the golden aspen, when suddenly the mangas comes and gnaws at the tree trunk to fell it down. The girl and her son jump to the silver one, then the coral one, and finally to the pearl one, the mangas destroying the other aspens until there is only the pearl one. In the nick of time, two dogs cross the sea and attack the mangas, ripping it to pieces. The girl traverses the sea with the dogs and recognizes a man on a horse: it is her husband, who has come to rescue her. The tale was also translated to Romanian as Mânzul fermecat ("Magic Foal").

In another Mongolian tale translated as Die achtzehnjährige Aigalzoo ("Eighteen-year-old Aigalzu"), a prince and a princess have a beautiful daughter named Aigalzu, whom they raised in a glass house to protect her from the world. When she comes of age, they decide to marry her, and set a test for any potential suitors: to guess her name and age. A poor monk discovers her name and guesses it right. Her mother and father lament this situation, since a monk's life is a hard one. She takes with her a mirror shard, a flint and a comb, and goes to live with the monk. After three years, she decides to visit her parents, and escapes from the monk. Her husband pursues her, and she throws the mirror shard, the flint and the comb to create magical obstacle to hinder the pursuit. She takes shelter with an old woman, who adopts her as her child, since the old woman's son died in the war fighting for another prince. Aigalzu finds the old woman's dead son's bow and arrow, and is given a talking horse. The old woman tells the girl the prince visits her once a month and must not know she is a girl, so she needs to dress in masculine clothes. Her horse also advises Aigalzu to act masculine and show interest in masculine activities. Eventually she is unmasked and marries the prince. One day, the prince has to travel abroad and asks Aigalzu to borrow her horse. The horse agrees to be lent, but the prince must not tie him in iron chains. Aigalzu gives birth to a boy and her mother-in-law writes her son a letter with the good news. However, the letter is intercepted by the same monk Aigalzu spurred once. The monk falsifies a series of letters, which culminates with Aigalzu and her son escaping from the palace on her talking horse. During the ride, she realizes that one of the horse's legs is stripped bare of its flesh, due to the iron chains the horse was fettered to. At a certain distance, the horse loses its strength and tells Aigalzu, after it dies, to use its eyes to create two ravens, its ears to create two foxes, its nostrils to create two tigers, its four legs to create four sandal trees, its skin to create a verdant meadow, its heart and liver to create a rock, and its blood to create a red sea. She obeys the horse's instructions. Some time later, the monk appears in the meadow. Aigalzu and her son climb the four sandal trees to escape from the monk, who chops down each tree with an axe.

==== Nanai people ====
Researcher Kira Van Deusen collected a Nanai tale from storyteller Anna Petrovna Khodzher. In her tale, titled Endohochen, two sisters live together. One day, a creature named Endohochen steals the tongue of one of the sisters. One night, she has a dream about an old woman. The old woman tells her she will give her a white horse, and that she can get her own tongue back. Eventually, she gets her tongue back and escapes on the white horse to a village. The girl, named Pudin, marries a man named Mergen and bears him a son. Endohochen goes after her, and Pudin cries out for the white horse to save her. The horse races to her with all its might, and takes her away. At a safe distance, the horse tells her he has lost all his strength, and asks Pudin to kill him and wrap his skin around her and the baby. She follows the horse's request and sleeps in the horsekin. When she wakes up, Pudin notices she is now in a fine house. Van Deusen noted that the name of the heroine, Pudin (or Pudi, and Fudin), is given to the heroine in Nanai tales; that the narrative sequence with the horse is similar to "epic heroines among the Turks and Mongols", and that the episode of the exchanged letters is reminiscent of the European tale The Handless Maiden.

==== Nepal ====
In a tale from Nepal with the title "ДЕВУШКА И БРАТЬЯ-ДЕМОНЫ" ("The Girl and the Demon-Brothers"), a mother has a beautiful daughter that is wooed by many suitors, but she refuses every romantic advance. One day, three demon brothers disguise themselves as humans and try to court the girl. Her mother agrees to their courtship, but first they have to guess her daughter's name. The demon brothers ask a hare, a fox and a magpie if they can spy on the girl and her mother. The hare and the fox fail, but the magpie learns: "Flower of Paradise". They guess it right and the mother gives her daughter to the demon brothers. As a parting gift, the mother gives her daughter a white horse. Flower of Paradise lives a hellish marital life: every chore is thrust on her, and she is chastised for everything. One day, while the demon brothers are away, she opens a door and sees a pile of human bones. She cries that she may share such grim fate, but her mother's voice, coming from her apron, tells her to take the white horse and escape. She wears the apron on her to take the shape of an old lady and flees with the horse to another kingdom. There, she takes the job as a servant in the palace. As her pastime, she goes to the river, takes off the apron, and combs her hair by the water. A shepherd notices the beautiful girl at the river, and tells the monarch about it. The monarch goes to the river and sees Flower of Paradise. He learns of her story and marries her. Some time later, he has to travel afar, to the other side of his dominions. While he is away, Flower of Paradise gives birth to a boy and writes her husband a letter. The messenger takes the letter and journeys to meet the monarch, but stops by a tree where three men are drinking wine. By getting the messenger drunk, the three men - the demon brothers - discover the location of Flower of Paradise and falsify the messenger's letters. Flower of Paradise receives a false letter with a message to get her son and leave the kingdom. Wondering about the strange letter, she decides to obey it anyway and departs with her son on the white horse. The white horse stops at a desert and asks Flower of Paradise to kill him, and spread his skin, bones and hooves on the four corners, and his mane around it. She obeys the horse's orders and, the next day, she and her son wake up in comfortable beds in a grand palace. Eventually, the monarch finds Flower of Paradise and their son in the grand palace. At the end of the tale, they are visited by three men, which Flower of Paradise recognizes as the demon-brothers, by looking at a scar on the hand of one of the men. The girl plots with her husband how to get rid of the demon brothers: they dig out a hole in the ground, draw the demon brothers there. They fall inside, and Flower of Paradise's servants close the hole on the demons.

In another Nepalese tale, collected in Dsarkot, Mustang, and translated into German with the title Die schöne Men Suka Drönyok ("The Beautiful Men Suka Drönyok"), a king named Benda Horki Gyewo has three sons, each promising to marry brides of their own choice: the elder, a rich one; the middle one, a smart one; the youngest, a beautiful one. Meanwhile, Men Suka Drönyok's father sets a riddle for her potential suitors: whoever guesses her name right, shall marry her. A demon comes to try his luck in marrying the girl, and Men Suka's father gives him three chances, one on each day. The demon threatens a "Kojote" into revealing the girl's name: twice the animal forgets her name, but on the third time he learns of her true name and informs the demon. The creature comes to court Men Suka and gives the correct answer, taking the girl with him. They pass by a golden palace and one of mother-of-pearl, until they reach a castle made of dog excrement. Despite the foul appearance, its interior is indeed luxurious. Settling in her new life, Men Suka is given a key to all rooms by the demon, and he leaves on a hunt. While he is away, she finds a rusty key to a strange room. She uses it and finds inside piles of corpses from humans and horses alike, all belonging to his victims. A still alive victim sees Men Suka and orders her to flee. The girl obeys: she places a mannequin dressed like her, wears an old woman disguise and fools her demonic husband, then escapes to another kingdom, where Benda Horki Gyewo's three sons live. The girl is hired as a shepherdess and is made to look after the dogs and cows. The animals get fatter and healthier than before, and she is made to look after the swine. The youngest prince finds Men Suka's old woman disguise, and marries her. Later, the king sets three tasks for the three princes to determine who shall succeed him: Men Suk helps her husband and fulfills her father-in-law's task, allowing her husband to ascend to the throne. Later, when her husband is away at some royal business, Men Suka gives birth to boy with an upper body part of gold, the lower part of silver, and forehead made of mother-of-pearl. A sequence of falsified letters writes that she gave birth to objects, and Men Suka receives a false reply telling her to throw the boy beyond 9 mountains and valleys. Men Suka escapes with her son on a horse and meets an old man on the road (her previous fiancé, the demon). The old man swallows the child, but Men Suka kils him with a pin. A horse she has herded in the past accompanies her and, as a last help to its mistress, asks Men Suka to kill it, spread its entrails on the edges of the meadow, and place its kidneys on the right and on the left, its head in the middle, and its four legs on the four cardinal points. Men Suka follows its directions and sacrifices the horse; its body parts create a palace for her and her son, a tiger and a leopard its guards and subjects from drops of the horse's blood. Later, her husband wanders off until he finds the newly built palace, and reunites with his wife, Men Suka, and their son.

==== Kazakhstan ====
In a Kazakh tale titled Дудар Қыз (Turkish: Duvdar Kız, English: "The Duvdar Girl"), translated into Hungarian with the title A fakó lovacska ("The White Horse") and to English as Dudar Qyz, or The Girl With the Tangled Locks, a rich man has much cattle and properties, but no children. People wonder why the man has not suffered any cattle theft, and attribute his success to a white horse he owns. One day, he is invited to the khan's banquet, but cannot sit anywhere since he has no son, nor daughter. The man and his wife make a cattle offering and pray to God for a child. In a vision, a voice tells him that if he performs a certain deed, he will be granted a daughter. So a daughter is born to him. Years later, she proclaims she is her own master, and becomes a beautiful young woman that is courted by many suitors. She sets a riddle for her suitor: they are to guess her name. She tells her parents her name is Dudar Kyz. One day, when her caravan moves from place to place, the name Dudar Kyz is shouted, and the girl thinks someone called her. Some time later, a suitor comes to guess her name, and gets it right. Before she leaves with her bridegroom, she talks to her white horse about the bridegroom. The horse reveals the bridegroom is a wicked wolf that took on human shape, and the equine advises her go ask her father for some items to take with her to her new home: a bow and arrow, a black servant on a black camel, and the white horse. She rides the white horse to her new home, her suitor ahead of her. He becomes a wolf, devours the black camel and turns back to human. They reach his tent, and his elder wife asks to tie Dudar's horse. Dudar's declines and ties the horse outside the yurt, and remains there. While her husband wakes up screaming for Dudar Kyz, the girl, still outside, dons male clothing and goes with the horse far away from the tent. She meets another youth during a hunt. She kills two animals as game for herself, and the youth, named Tostuk, is so impressed by the feat he suggests they become brothers. Tostuk takes Dudar Kyz (in male disguise) to his tent, and his mother suspects her son's new friend is a girl. Dudar Kyz and Tostuk take part in a test set by another khan: whoever shoots a bag of money atop a tree, shall marry his daughter. Dudar Kyz wins and marries the khan's daughter. Dudar Kyz brings the khan's daughter with her to Tostuk's tent, and ponders about her situation. Her white horse advises her to reveal the truth to Tostuk. Dudar Kyz invites Tostuk to a ride in the steppe and shows him her true identity. Tostuk accepts her and marries both her and the khan's daughter. Some time later, war erutpts, and Tostuk is drafted, just as Dudar Kyz falls pregnant. Tostuk tells his mother to look after his wife and to name his son Altyn-Báj, takes Dudar Kyz's horse and rides to battle. While he is way, Dudar Kyz gives birth to a boy with golden head and silver chest. Her mother-in-law writes a letter to her son for a man to deliver it to him. The messenger gets the letter, but stops at a house that belongs to a bony witch, the mother of Dudar Kyz's rejected suitor. The messenger delivers Tostuk's mother's letter to him, and he writes a response. The messenger passes by the bony witch's house again and she falsifies Tostuk's response, writing a command to take Dudar Kyz and her son and burn them. Dudar Kuz reads the letter and cries. She hears the trot of her white horse. The animal comes, its legs badly hurt, and tells her to take Altyn-Báj and come with him. The horse rushes to whatever destination they can reach, and the bony witch appears to chase her. Dudar Kyz throws behind her a comb, which becomes a forest to delay the witch. Then, she drops a mirror and it becomes a lake. Dudar Kyz and the horse fall into the lake, and the bony witch grabs her arm. Dudar Kyz cuts her horse's belly; the horse strikes the witch with its hind legs; the witch lets go of her and sinks into the lake. At the other margin, the white horse, sensing its approaching death, asks Dudar Kyz to use its legs to create a herd of horses, and its chest to create a large white yurt for her and her son. After the horse perishes, she grieves for it three days, then follows his instructions: a yurt appears before the girl, where she raises her son Altyn-Báj. Eventually, Tostuk finds his wife and son again, after many years, and the family is reunited.

==== Kyrgyzstan ====
Turkologist Vasily Radlov first collected the tale Dudar Kys in the late 19th century, and sourced it from Kyrgyzstan.

In another tale sourced from Kyrgyzstan and collected in Turgay with the title "Волкъ-женихъ" ("Wolf Bridegroom"), a rich old man wants to marry his daughter, Ганиф (Hanif), to a possible suitor, but sets a test for them: he fashions a pair of gloves of louseskin, and any suitor must guess their material. Hanif complains to a friend about the louseskin gloves, but their conversation is overheard by two wolves. The wolves shapeshift into humans and go to the rich man's tent to win Hanif. One of the human wolves answers correctly and prepares to take the girl to his own yurt. After moving out to her bridegroom's yurt, Hanif discovers her bridegroom and his friend are wolves. Her horse warns her to take a ring and a brooch from the yurt and escape. Hanif throws behind the items and misses her pursuers. Now at a distance, the horse feels it cannot go on, and urges Hanif to kill it, eat his flesh and drink his blood, spill the rest of the blood around her, rip open its belly and extract its entrails. She then needs to cover herself in the horse's belly and hold its right leg next to her. Hanif refuses to fulfill her horse's dying request, but eventually does it. The next morning, the horse's belly becomes a magnificent kibitk, the horse leg becomes a handsome youth and the drops of blood all around her becomes a nation of people that choose her as their ruler.

==== Azeri Turks ====
In an Azeri Turk tale collected in Tebriz with the title Ağ At ("White Horse"), a king has a beautiful daughter who desires to travel the world, but the king forbids her. Thus, she puts on a male disguise, takes her white horse from the stables and rides away from her homeland to another country where a sultan rules. The sultan's son falls in love with her and suspects the newcomer is female, despite his mother's doubts. The sultana suggests he sets tests to determine the newcomer's gender: first, to take them to the market; if they check some "mir mıncık" (jewels and beads), they are female; if they check swords, they are male. The princess's white horse advises her to feign interest in the swords. Next, the sultana suggests her son places some roses on their bed at night, if the roses wither, they are female, if not, they are male. The princess's white horse tells her it will wake up early in the morning and restore the roses with its breath. The sultan's son and his mother keep testing her gender, but are thwarted each time by the white horse. One day, the princess says there are still many places to visit, decides to depart and takes her white horse. She rides to a desert, where the horse says this is the end of her journey, so it will die, and she is to scatter its bones around. The horse dies and the girl scatters its bones, creating a large city where she rules as queen. She then marries the son of the sultan.

==== Iran ====
Researcher Adrienne Boulvin summarized an Iranian tale from Meched (Mashhad, formerly in the Khorasan province, modern day Razavi Khorasan province), with the title La Peau de la Puce ("The Louseskin"). In this tale, a king is bitten by a louse, captures it and fattens it until it is large enough, then kills it and prepares a riddle for any suitor: they must guess the material of the large hide exposed on the city's gates, then they shall marry the princess. A div overhears the vizir talking about the secret to his wife, and learns of the correct answer. The div guesses it right and takes the princess as his bride. With the help of a magic horse, she escapes from the div, who tries to get her. To delay his pursuit, the princess throws behind her a needle to create a field of needles, a bit of salt to create a cover of salt, and waterjug to create a sea between them. The princess manages to escape on the magic horse, and the tale ends.

Professor Mahomed-Nuri Osmanovich Osmanov translated an Iranian tale into Russian with the title "Козни дервиша" ("The Intrigue of a Dervish"). In this tale, an old padishah has 40 wives and no children. A dervish appears to him and gives him an apple, to be divided in half and each half cut in 40 pieces, and to give each piece to his 40 wives and 40 mares, but he demands one child and one horse as payment. The padishah agrees and follows the dervish's orders: the next year, his 40 wives are heavy with child, as well as his mares. The dervish appears to get his due, and chooses a girl and a colt, taking them with him. The dervish rides the colt to a garden, then dismounts the horse to look for a key to open the garden. While he is away, the colt warns the girl the dervish wants to kill her, and they make their escape to another kingdom. The colt advises her to put on men's clothes, and gives her some of its hairs. The girl-as-man becomes friends with another padishah's son during a hunt, who believes he is a youth, and invites him in to his palace. The prince's mother suspects that is a girl, but the princess remains quiet about it. Some time later, the kingdom is attacked by another king, and the colt tells its rider they will join the battle and win. The princess and her horse defeat the enemies, and goes back to her room. Her friend, the prince goes to check on his friend, and discovers her true gender. He reports to his mother, who admits she was right. The prince and princess celebrate their betrothal in a grand ceremony, but the prince has to leave for a while. Back to the dervish, he found the key to the gate, but finds out that the girl and the colt have vanished, so he goes after them. He stops by a four-path crossroads, and sees a messenger coming. He convinces the messenger to stop for a while, and gives him a soporific drink, so he can check into his letters. The dervish finds a letter addressed to the princess, and falsifies it, leading to a sequence of forged missives that state that the prince thinks that the princess is having an affair, and writes an order to burn her alive. The princess gets the false letters, and decides to submit to her fate. During the execution, the princess throws one of the colt's hairs into the fire; the animal appears before her and they ride together away to a river margin. The colt says it will soon perish, and declares that its body will become a palace to house her, and its two ears musicians and singers. It happens thus, and the princess lives in the palace. Meanwhile, her betrothed discovers the series of forged letters and, thinking the princess was killed, hangs the messenger and becomes a wanderer in the desert. The princess leaves the palace to wander the desert, and meets the prince as he is drinking from a stream.

==== Balochistan ====
In a tale from Balochistan with the title "Китайское дерево" ("Chinese Tree"), a ruler falls deep into his own grief for not having children he becomes a dervish in the middle of the road. A creature named malang appears to him, is told of his problem and gives the ruler two pomegranates, one for him and the other to be divided and given to his wives and the mares in his stables. In exchange, the ruler is to deliver him his firstborn and the foal that his beloved mare will give birth to. The ruler accepts the malang's deal and gives the pomegranates to his wives: a girl is born to his beloved wife, and a filly to his beloved horse. Unwilling to part with his daughter, he raises her secretly in a dungeon. The girl grows up a beautiful maiden, and the malang goes to the king under a beggar disguise to remind him of his promise: his daughter and the mare. The king tries to offer the malang one of his sons, but the creature wants the girl. Thus, the girl and the mare are delivered to him. They pass by a graveyard, and a skull cries in joy, then sheds tears. The princess inquires the skull about it and it answers it was happy for her beauty, and sad for the girl's unfortunate fate: to be devoured by the malang or live in a grave with him, then, as parting words, tells her to obey her mare's advice. The girl and the mare reach the malang's house, a grave, and he shoves her in. After the malang leaves, the mare begins to speak and says it will take the princess to safety, as swift as the wind. The mare takes the princess to another city, where she sells her belongings and buys male clothes, passing herself off as a man. She, in male disguise, befriends the local prince. The prince's father, however, suspects she is a girl, and sets tests for her: to choose between women's apparel and men's weapons; and to choose between delicacies for men and those for women. With the mare's neigh, the girl passes the first test, but sleeps through the second and is discovered. Still, the prince marries her. The mare then tells her mistress not to loan it to anyone, but, one day, the prince, her husband, has to travel to another land, and borrows his wife's per mare. While he is away, the princess gives birth to twin sons, and sends a letter to inform her husband. The messenger begins his journey, but stops to rest under a "Chinese tree". The malang appears and intercepts the letters to cause the princess to flee from the kingdom. It happens thus: the princess reads the false letter and runs away with her twin children, a saddle and a bridle. During her exile, she meets the same malang under the Chinese tree. The malang attacks her, and the mare, which sensed her mistress was in danger, rushes back to her aid and kills the malang, not before it stabs the horse. At its last breaths, the mare asks the princess to open up its belly, take out the entrails and spread them around to create a garden, and then enter its skin with her children. The next day, a palace springs up, surrounded by a beautiful garden. Back to her husband, after he learns of the exchanged letters, goes afters his wife and finds the palace near the Chinese tree. He then reunites with his family.

==== Uzbekistan ====
In an Uzbek tale titled "Черный волшебный конь" ("The Black Magic Horse"; Turkish: Kara Müșkül At), collected by Uzbek folklorist Muzayyana Alaviya, a padishah suffers for not having any child, until a qalander comes to his palace and predicts he shall father a girl, and warns him he shall not deny anything she asks of him. The qalander gives the padishah an apple, whose half the padishah eats and his wife the other half. They have a daughter they call Mushkiya ("fragrant"). One day, the maidservants find a louse in her hair. Mushkiya decides to fatten it, skin it and make a carpet as part of a suitor riddle. To keep the secret, Mushkiya orders her nanny to be taken to desert. Out of pity, another servant simply abandons the nanny in the desert and brings back a bloodied kerchief. Still in the desert, the "Wolf King" approaches her and she tells the answer to the princess's riddle. The Wolf King and his pack come to the palace to woo the princess, and he guesses it right. The padishah shames his daughter for such a foolish whim, but she says she will consult with a vizier. The vizier advises her to get a magic black horse - inherited from her ancestors - from the stables, a whip and garments; follow the wolf to its den on a horse, but not dismount it, then ride the horse towards any unknown destination. Mushkiya rides the magic black horse after her wolf suitor to its cave, and before she dismounts, she puts her plans into action: pretending to "exorcize" evil spirits from the wolf's cave, she whips her horse three times, each time the horse soaring high in the sky, then flying away. Meanwhile, in another kingdom, a widowed kingdom is told by his wiseman that his future bride will come in a flying horse. The king meets the rider on the flying horse, and thinks they are male, instead of his prophesied bride. The king mistakes him for a male rider and tries to unmask her by some tests: by sitting next to him, and bathing in the river. Eventually, the king falls ill with love for the girl and she reveals herself. Mushkiya and the king marry. Some time later, the king has to leave on a mission around the kingdom, and leaves his wife to the court's care. After nine months, Mushkiya gives birth to male twins, Hassan and Husan, and the vizier writes him a letter. A messenger is assigned to take the letter to the king, but stops to rest by a lodge on the way. After the messenger delivers the true letter to the king, he passes by the same lodge, where the owner's daughter - a spurned suitor to the king - changes the king's missive for a false command to burn Mushkiya and her children at the stake. The vizier receives the letter and despite doubting its contents at first, decides to carry out the orders. Before the queen is burnt, her magic black horse takes her and the children elsewhere. At a safe distance, the horse says he is dying, and asks Mushkiya to bury his eyes to create two springs, his ears to create gates, strips of its skin to create a fortress-city and its mane to grant greater fortune. The horse dies, and Mushkiya separates its body parts. Overnight, an entire fortified city appears to her, where she lives with the twins. Meanwhile, the king returns from his mission and, thinking his wife and sons are dead, decides to wander about as a beggar. He eventually goes to the new fortified city that appeared overnight and finds his wife and children. After a joyous reunion, the family is separated again: Mushkiya is kidnapped by a caravan; while trying to cross a river, the king loses both Hassan and Husan, and washes up in another kingdom; Hassan is stolen by a wolf, but saved by a huntsman; Husan is swallowed by a fish, but is saved by a fisherman. At the end of the tale, after a long time of separation, the family is reunited for good.

In a tale collected from an Uzbek source in Afghanistan with the title "بورگه نینگ َسرکه بولیشی", translated as Pirenin Erkeç Olması ("The Flea Becoming a Goat"), an old man asks his daughter to clean up his beard and she finds a louse. He asks her to keep it alive in a bag and feed it with camel milk. After years, the man wants to see what became of the louse, and she opens the bag: the louse has become as large as a goat. The man says he will slaughter the goat and make a hide of it, hang it on their door and give her in marriage to whoever guesses the material right. It happens thus. A woman who knew of the ploy runs to a young man with the answer, and a dev overhears their conversation. The dev goes to the old man's house and says the right answer, then takes the human girl as his wife. The girl agrees to leave with the dev, but asks to take her father's mare. The dev sends the girl ahead to his house. The girl has a mirror, a puppy, and a comb, which she throws to the ground to create obstacles: the comb becomes a forest of thorns and the puppy a mountain. The dev asks the girl how she crossed both obstacles. She then drops the mirror and it becomes a river. The dev asks her how she crossed, and she lies that she put a stone in her pants and crossed. The dev does so, jumps into the river and sinks. The girl rides the mare to a friend of her father's, who asks her about what happened. The girl explains her father gave her to a dev, but she escaped. Her father's friend marries her to his shepherd son. For years, they live together and she bears twin children while her husband is herding the sheep in a distant location in the highlands. The girl's father-in-law sends a letter to his son through a messenger, but the same dev as before falsifies the missives to write that the girl gave birth to a kitten and a cat, and writes an order to banish her. Her father-in-law, a bey, places the children and the girl on the horse and expels them. On the road, her dev-suitor appears to take revenge on her. Her mount, the horse, comforts the girl as soon as it notices her crying, and asks her to release its burdens, for it will fight the dev; if blood pools on the surface, it lost, but if foam appears, the dev has perished. The horse fights the dev underwater in a river; first blood pools, then foam appears, representing his victory. The horse emerges from the river with the dev's corpse and tells the girl to burn it and scatter its ashes to create a lush place out of the desert. The following day, she does as the horse instructed, and turns the desert into a greenery. Next, the horse says that it is sick and may die, so she is to kill it, peel off its skin, cut off its ears and place its eyes under them; hide their hooves in another place, and cook and eat its flesh. The girl kills the horse, scatters its entrails, cooks the flesh, and covers herself with the horse's pelt. A tent appears out of the horse's hide, plane trees from the ears, and fountains from the eyes. Sometime later, a man sleeps next to the fountain, and the girl believes that he may be her husband. Thus she sends her two children with a jug of water for him and sticks. The children give water to the man, who sees the boy and the girl playing with the sticks as if they are horses. The man comments that they are silly for playing like a fake horse can eat or drink, and they retort that so is a woman giving birth to puppies and kittens. The man suspects they are his children, so he asks them to tell their mother the reason for this little play. The children do so, and return to report to the man at the fountain: their father is a shepherd whose wife gave birth to their children in his absence, then a servant was sent to deliver letters when a dev falsified the correspondence. The man recognizes the children as his and reunites with his wife. The tale was collected from a 49-year-old source named Mübarek, from Tahar, Deshtikale, in 2021, who heard it from his mother.

In an Uzbek tale titled Balıkçı Yiğit, translated to Turkish as Balıkçı Yiğit ("The Fisherman"), a king in the city of Namangan wants a child, and his wife gives birth to a girl they name Nigar, and raise in a tower built for her. The girl lives in the tower, surrounded by a garden with a pool. When she reaches marriageable age, the king worries about finding a suitable match for princess Nigar, and sets up a test: she shall marry whoever answers correctly two riddles, what is the longest thing and what is the deepest thing. Many come and cannot answer, so they are given two hundred whippings. A poor, but clever servant of the king knows the answer, but, fearing telling it to the monarch, talks to a well the answer: the road is the longest thing and the deepest is the sleep. However, a male witch that lives in the well hears the answers, dons a beggar disguise and goes to the palace to utter the correct answer. He goes to the palace on many days and is finally let in to give the correct answer. The king orders the beggar to be removed from sight, but the male witch throws a cap and creates a thick darkness around the kingdom. Frightened, the king agrees to marry princess Nigar to the beggar. After the forty wedding is over and Nigar is given forty camels and forty concubines as her dowry, Nigar goes to the stables to choose a horse, and an equine asks the princess to choose it and take with her a mirror, a comb, a salt and some red pepper. Nigar and her retinue reach the male witch's lair and spend time there. However, the witch devours some of the camels and concubines, and Nigar worries she might be next, so the goes to talk with the horse. The horse asks Nigar to steal the witch's golden ring, so she hits it against a stone wall and opens up a path. Nigar flees with the horse. The following day, the witch wakes up, devours the camels and concubines, discovers the princess has escapes and goes after her. On the road, Nigar and the horse see that they are being pursued and throw behind objects to deter him: the pepper becomes a thorny field that prickles the witch's bare feet; the salt becomes a swamp, the comb a thick forest, and the mirror a vast river between them. The witch tries to cross the river, when he finds a young fisherman sailing on a boat, so he demands the human fisherman carries him across the river. The witch promises to pay him a hundred gold coins to ferry him. As they approach the other margin, the witch reneges on his vow and starts to argue with the fisherman. Princess Nigar shouts at the fisherman to kill the witch, and the fisherman tosses him overboard. Princess Nigar returns home and asks her father to bring the fisherman. The king thinks that the fisherman committed some sin and orders his beheading, but princess Nigar intervenes on his behalf and says the youth saved her life, so she will marry him.

==== Tajikistan ====
A similar tale is attested in a manuscript archived in the Institute of Oriental Studies of the Academy of Sciences of the then Soviet Union. The manuscript, indexed as B 4496, is dated to the 19th century, and written in colloquial Tajik. In a summary of the tale, titled "Повесть об 'Аламарай" ("The Story of Alamaray"), the women at her father's harem accuse princess Alamaray, and she is set to be executed. However, her horse, which is a Peri, rescues her and takes her to another kingdom, where she wears a masculine disguise and befriends a prince. The prince sets tests to determine his friend's identity. She passes the tests, but eventually reveals herself and marries the prince, giving birth to a son. Once again, she is slandered and walked to her execution, but her horse again saves her. Alamaray rules a magical city. Her husband finds her in the city, and meets their son.

==== Khanty people ====
In a tale from the Khanty people collected in 1978 and published in 1990 with the title "Золотой конь" ("Golden Horse"), a girl finds a golden louse in her father's hair and blows it; it changes into a golden horse. They decide to set a riddle: whoever guesses the horse's origins shall marry the girl. An evil sorcerer overhears their conversation, comes to court the girl and guesses it right. Before she departs, the golden horse advises her to tie a large birch bark on her and let the sorcerer ride ahead. During the journey, the girl rides away with the horse and they are chased by the sorcerer, who only grabs the birch. Both escape to a royal city, where live the sons of Ort-iki. She asks for some food, drink and lodge in Ort-iki's house, and ends up marrying Ort-iki's youngest son. Some time later, the girl's husband has to go to war and borrows the golden horse, and is advised by the girl not to tie the horse to a thick tree trunk. While her husband is away at war, she gives birth to a boy with the moon on a cheek and the sun on the other, and a servant writes a letter to her husband with the good news. The evil sorcerer returns and falsifies a series of letters, with a command to expel the girl and her son from home. Ort-iki's messengers give him the false message, which the girl decides to carry out. She leaves home and wanders off, when her golden horse appears to her, his bridle tied to a thick trunk. The horse tells her it lost all strength, but advises her to cut open its flesh and enter its belly. The next day, she wakes up in a house, and her son shouts at her that his father is coming to visit them. However, the sorcerer appears for a last attack, and the girl cuts off his head with a sword. After burning the sorcerer's corpse, she welcomes her husband into her house.

==== Ulch people ====
In an untitled tale from the Ulch people, an old man has an only daughter he wishes to marry to a rich man, but she wants to marry a poor man, and they argue for it. One day, the daughter finds a louse on her father's hair, which he uses to make a shaman drum as part of a suitor riddle: whoever guesses it right, shall marry his daughter. The girl's father is rich, and his servants gossip about the riddle, which is eavesdropped on by two giants. When the servants go down to fetch water, the giants ask the maidservants the secret of the shaman drum. They servants refuse at first, but are threatened, so they reveal the answer. The giants tell the rich man the answer, and the girl is forced to go with them. However, before she leaves, she hides a bar, a quern, and cuts out an image of a horse in a piece of paper. A living horse appears to her, which she mounts to accompany the giants to their house. To distract them, the girl tells them to wait on the road, while she goes ahead and clear the house for them. Tricked by her words, the girl enters their house, but blows on her horse and gallops away from them. The giants discover the deception and run after her. The girl's horse begins to talk and warns her that the giants are after her, so she throws behind the objects hidden in her clothes to deter them: a bar that creates a mountain, an awl that becomes a net, and another bar that becomes a stone pillar. During the flight, her paper horse begins to tire, so she creates a few more to keep running. The girl climbs on the stone pillar to escape the giants. She has a last piece of paper on her, she fashions a last horse and rides it away to another land. At a distance, the horse tells the girl it will soon die, but asks her to use its blood to draw the image of a house and a barn, and for her to wrap its skin around her body. It happens thus: the girl sleeps in the horseskin, and wakes up in a fine house furnished with a fireplace and some skiis for her to hunt with. One day, she sees that her beloved poor suitor is coming to her, but behind her a giant on a boat behind him. The girl rushes to the barn, takes an arrow and shoots it at the giant. Free at last, the girl lives with her beloved and they have a son together.

=== Americas ===
==== North America ====
Scholar Stanley Lynn Robe located a similar tale in America, published by José Manuel Espinosa and sourced from New Mexico. In this tale, the devil comes to woo a girl in form of a boy. The girl accompanies him riding her own mule, which helps her escape from the devil by riding through rivers of blood, fire and blades. After they reach another kingdom, the girl disguises herself in male's clothes and the local prince tries to unmask her. The mule helps the girl in two occasions, but on the third the prince discovers the girl and they marry.

==== West Indies ====
In a tale collected by folklorist Elsie Clews Parsons with the title The Horse that Rescues: Man or Woman? and sourced from Saint Kitts, a gentleman has a daughter who refuses any suitor. One day, a man with golden teeth comes to his house and asks for a glass of water. A servant gives him the glass, and the girl sees the golden teeth, then declares he is the one for her. The gentleman agrees to marry her, but insists she takes with her an old horse named Yellah Dander. Despite the girl's protests, she takes the horse with her. They ride to the man's house, then he retires to another room, and says he will send for her later. After he leaves, the horse begins to talk and reveals the golden-toothed man is the devil, and she is to wait until the servants come in. Five servants come in, then the man himself, and the horse tells the girl to take off a shoe and strike its behind with the heel, so that they may go back to her father's house. However, the girl kicks the horse with the sole of the shoe and they rush to another country. Before they enter the city, the horse advises the girl to go to the tailor for clothes and to a barber to shave her hair. She leaves her horse outside the city, and the animal advises her to say "his" father was the governor there once and "he" has come to claim the position. In her male disguise, she does as instructed and the people prepare a ball for her. The horse advises her not to dance after midnight, lest she be discovered as a woman. Next, they ask her to take a bath with the people, but, with the horse's advice, she manages to avoid being found out. At the end of the tale, the horse asks the girl to burn a rope with coal, then put the burnt the rope on it; after he burns down, she is to take the ashes, store them in a bag, then place the bag under her head, and she will find herself back home with the horse. The girl follows the instructions and both return to her father's house.

=== Africa ===
==== Central Africa ====
In a Central African folktale collected by missionary Robert Hamill Nassau from the Mpongwe people with the title Leopard of the Fine Skin, in a town named Ra-Mborakinda, princess Ilâmbe demands to be married only to a man who has not any blemish on his skin. Her father, king Mborakinda, dislikes her behaviour, but lets her be. As such, many suitors have come to court her, and many have been spurned. Even animals begin to assume human shape to try to court her, until it is Leopard's turn. Leopard meets an old doctor named Ra-Marânge, who directs him to a sorcerer named Ogula-ya-mpazya-vazya. The sorcerer prepares a medicine for Leopard and he becomes a human called Ogula-Njĕgâ. In human form, he goes to Ra-Mborakinda to court Ilâmbe, who falls in love with him since his body has not any spot or blemish. A marriage is arranged between them, but King Mborakinda, through his okove (a magic fetish), senses something evil regarding his daughter's marriage and pushes her aside for a talk: he gives her a key and tells her to unlock a house, where she will find two Kabala (magic horses) and she must choose the lame-looking one. Despite her questions, she obeys her father and takes the lame horse with her, along with a retinue of servants. On the road, Ogula-Njĕgâ, still feeling his animal instincts despite being in human shape, tells his wife he go ahead of her; at a distance, he changes into a leopard, hunts some prey, then returns to his human wife as a human male. Some time later, the retinue arrives at Leopard's village, where all animals have transformed into humans by some magic. Princess Ilâmbe falls into a routine where she stays at home, while Ogula-Njĕgâ lies he has business in another town, turns into a leopard to hunt prey, then comes home. Time passes, and Ilâmbe wishes to have a food-plantation and orders her servants to dig up the ground, but her servants start disappearing - her husband's doing. After many disappearances, Ilâmbe begins to feel lonely and pets her Horse as a friend. The horse begins to speak in a human voice and tells her the servants have been devoured by her husband, and that, after her close maidservants vanish too, she will be the last. It happens as the horse described; the horse then advises Ilâmbe to prepare three gourds: one with ground-nuts, the second with gourd seeds and the third with water. The next day, Ogula-Njĕgâ's mother tells him she suspects something about his wife and the horse, but sleeps next to her. The following day, Ogula-Njĕgâ goes about his "business"; while he is away, Ilâmbe escapes with her Horse and the gourds. Ogula-Njĕgâ comes home and, noticing his wife's absence, turns into a leopard and rushes after her. The Horse senses the pursuit and orders Ilâmbe to throw the gourds behind them, one after the other: the Leopard eats the contents of the first two and the third breaks apart and creates a large stream between them. The Horse brings Ilâmbe to another village where only men may enter, and changes her gender to a male. Ilâmbe rides the Horse into the village and takes shelter with a youth, who begins to suspect the newcomer is a woman, not a man, so he sets tests to unmask their gender: to bathe in the river with the men. With the horse's magic, Ilâmbe truly becomes a man and avoids any discovery. Later, the Horse asks her to shoot him, cut up his flesh and burn it, then take his ashes and scatter them outside the village. Ilâmbe follows the horse's instructions: she turns back into a woman, and appears mounted on Horse. They return to Ra-Mborakinda and Ilâmbe sees the error of her behaviour.

==== Wolof people ====
In a Wolof tale from Senegal published by author Lilyan Kesteloot with the title Koumba et son cheval ("Koumba and her Horse"), a beautiful young woman named Koumba wishes to marry a man with no scars. News of her wish spread through the land and many men try and fail to court her. However, a djinn learns of this, changes shape to that of a handsome man and goes to woo her. Koumba and her parents examine the newcomer's body and, on finding no scars, agree to his marriage. Koumba's father asks her to go to the stables, slap the horses and take the one that neighs as his farewell gift, while her mother gives her a cat and a dog as companions for the journey. Koumba goes to do what her father instructed and only a lame old horse neighs. Koumba refuses at first to ride on such an old horse, but her father advises her to take it, for it will be her father, mother and her neighbour. Still, she takes the old horse with her and joins her husband's entourage. However, as soon as the couple reach a baobab tree, the retinue disappears and the djinn reveals his true form, and that he lives in the baobab. Koumba spends her days preparing meals with the game her husband catches. One day, however, he returns empty-handed, and the horse neighs to alert Koumba. The horse, called Samba né de la nuit dernière, warns her that the djinn is doing it for her to prepare the cat and the dog for him. It happens thus, and Koumba's cat and dog fall prey to the djinn's hunger. Lastly, the horse warns that, after the pets are gone, the djinn will want to devour either of them, and suggests they leave at once before he returns. She fetches some belongings, and the horse advises her to spit all over the house for the spit to answer on her behalf, and warns her never to spur it on its right side, for somethine bad will happen if she does. It happens thus, and Koumba escapes on the horse to away from the baobab tree. The djinn returns and is tricked by the pools of spit, realizes his wife fled and goes after her. On the road, as the djinn approaches, Koumba spurs her mount on its right side and it flies away from the djinn to another country, where women are not allowed at all. The horse advises Koumba to put on a male disguise and join the other denizens. However, a local Moor begins to suspect the newcomer is a woman, not a man, and alerts the local king. In order to test the Moor's words, the king summons all men to fight in the war. The horse advises the girl to kill everything that passes through the air, while the horse takes care of the enemies on land. The king is impressed and convinced the Moor is a liar. Later, the Moor insists he is telling the truth and advises the king to hold a lamb, a fighting tournament, for women cannot fight. The horse changes Koumba's gender and advises her to aim for the king's son's head, and no one else. Koumba does as instructed and injures the king's son's head. The king learns that only the brains of a liar can cure his son, kills the Moor and uses the Moor's brain matter to heal him. Lastly, the horse tells Koumba that he is tired, and asks Koumba to let it die, then burn its remains on a pyre. When the flames consume the horse's body, Koumba enters the flames and is transported back to her parents' house.

==== Malinké people ====
In a tale collected by ethnologue Franz de Zeltner from a Malinké source named Zagné Taraoré, from around Bamako, and translated to French as La vieille jument ("The Old Mare"), a king has a beautiful daughter courted by many youths, but she refuses then, wanting to marry a man with no opening, not even an anus. Many still come to woo her, but she sends her younger sister, metamorphosed as a fly, to spy on the suitor's clothes and inform her. One day, a boa hears about the princess, assumes human form, and goes to court her. The girl decides at once to marry him, and her sister, turned into a fly, verifies that this one does not have any opening. The king suspects something amiss about this suitor. The boa, in human form, spends time at the king's house and does not eat anything, and after three days bids the girl come with him and bring anything her father wishes her to have. The girl talks to her father, and he offers an equine mount to the princess, for her to choose among his herd of fifty horses, foals of the same mare: she is to hold a bag of oats and choose the first horse that appears to her. It happens thus, and the old mare cries and talks to the king. The monarch agrees to let his daughter have the mare, which she grooms and rides to her husband's place. On the road, the boa asks the girl if she recognizes her surroundings: she says that they are her father's fields, then that her father's prisoners come to fetch firewood, and a third time that she admits she lies before. At this point of the journey, the boa tells the girl he will urinate, while she stays. While the boa is away, the old mare warns the girl that no men reaches marriageable age without scars, nor are they able to lack an opening, since they need to urinate. The mare also reveals that the suitor is a boa that will devour her, so the girl is to ride the mare and not to spur her, lest she never sees her parents again, and gives ehr three pebbles. Suddenly, a cloud dust rises, and the girl jumps on the mare to flee. On the road, the mare tells the girl to throw the pebbles behind her to deter the boa: the first creates a large river between them, the second a large mountain, and the third a think bush. The girl notices her father's house is on the horizon, but, fearing the boa will be reaching her, she accidentally spurs the mare and it flies off in the air to another kingdom. The local king kills foreign women, so the mare guides the princess to a place with large ants and asks for shelter, so the ants disguise the princess in male clothes: pants, boubou, shoes, a turban and a sword, and transform the old mare into a young filly. The princess pretends to be a knight, and, following the mare's advice, she gallops in front of the local king when he is resting under a tree. The local king is impressed and brings the false male knights to his palace. The mare belittles the princess for not listening to her, and tells her to take an ox, slaughter it, and give some meat to the neighbouring old woman. It happens thus. The next time, the old mare mocks the princess and warns her not to urinate on the doormate, lest the neighbour old woman sees that she is female after all. The princess is careless, so the neighbouring woman sees the truth of her sex and informs the king. The woman makes a vow that, if she is lying, she and her grandson's heads should be smashed, but she advises the king to test the newcomer knight's gender: first, to have them capture some guinea fowl, which woman cannot catch - with the old mare's help, the princess captures two fowls; second, to have them catch fishes in the swamp; lastly, to have them marry the local king's daughter, since a woman cannot deflower another. For the third test, the old mare tells the princess she will turn into a snake (a Naja nigricollis, according to Zeltner) and bite the bride. The princess, in male disguise, marries the local princess, and the old mare, in snake form, bites the bride to death. The old mare then advises the princess to tell the king she can revive the bride with a remedy whose final ingredient are the brains of an old woman, so the king sends for the neighbouring old woman and smashes her brain. The princess makes the remedy and revives the bride. Finally, the old mare tells the princess she should leave before Thursday, and lie that she will send for her bride later. The old mare and the princess return to the giant ants' lair, resume their original forms, and ride back home. However, the journey is too long, and many wild beasts roam the wilderness. As soon as lions, panthers and hyenas close in on them, the old mare stops in its tracks and admits it will die in that place. The princess laments she will die by the beasts, when the old mare advises the princess to cut open its belly, fetch a water vessel, and wash her eyes with the water. The princess does as instructed and finds herself back at her mother's bed. She finds the old mare back with the herd, and tells her parents what she experienced.

== Adaptations ==
British author Alan Garner developed a literary treatment of the narrative with the tale The Princess and the Golden Mane. In this tale, a princess falls in love with a stableboy, much to her father's, the king, disgust. They marry in secret, and he has to leave her. Before he departs, the stableboy tells his wife she will bear twins, a boy and a girl, and she can trust a golden-maned white horse from the stable to save her and their children. The king learns of the pregnancy and orders his knights to search far and wide for the stableboy, to no avail. Time passes. As petty revenge against his daughter, the king fattens a louse until it is large enough, kills it and uses its hide as part of a riddle: anyone who can guess the animal the hide belongs to, shall marry the princess. A strange beggarman comes to court and guesses it right. Fearing for her children, the princess consults with the golden-maned horse, which advises her to take it with her, since the beggarman will want to take only the children. Despite the king's protests, the princess joins the beggarman with the horse and her children. The group reaches a castle, but go behind it and enter a cave hidden by a large rock; the beggarman now transformed into a large ogre. After discovering the true nature of the beggarman, the princess takes her children and rides away on the horse . The ogre rushes behind them, but the horse advises the princess to throw behind her objects to create magical obstacles: a rose (that creates a wall of fire); a peck of salt (that becomes a mountain of glass); a comb (that creates a thorny forest of bronze) and a golden mirror (that creates a lake). On the other side of the lake, the ogre ties a large stone around his neck and begins his swim across the lake to reach the princess on the other side. The horse enters the lake and fights the ogre to the death, so intense their battle that the lake dries up. After the fight, the horse tells the princess to kill it, and throw its ribs towards the sun, its head towards the moon, and its legs to the "four horizons of the sky". The princess obeys its orders; the legs create four golden poplar trees with emerald leaves; the ribs change into a golden castle, with villages and meadows, and the head becomes a silver river. Sailing down the river is a golden boat, with her husband, the stableboy.

== See also ==
- Horse sacrifice
- Las barbas de plata (Spanish fairy tale)
- The Girl Soka and her Kind Horse
- Calumniated Wife
- The Three Golden Children (folklore)
- Vasilisa the Priest's Daughter
- Ileana Simziana (Romanian folktale)
- The Black Colt (Iranian folkale)
- The Magician's Horse (Lithuanian folktale)
