= The Girl Soka and her Kind Horse =

Tibetan tale

The Girl Soka and her Kind Horse is a Tibetan tale published as part of the compilation of The Golden Corpse (Tibetan: Mi ro gser sgrung), a compilation of tales popular in Tibet. It is about the marriage between a human maiden and demon disguised as a suitor, but she escapes to another kingdom where she marries a human prince; later, the horse sacrifices itself for its mistress after it rescues her from great peril.

== Origin ==
The Golden Corpse is a compilation of Indo-Tibetan stories that was later brought to Mongolia and translated to Mongolic languages. The collection is known in India as Vetala Pañcaviṃśati, in Tibet as Ro-sgrung, in Mongolia as Siditü kegür, and in Oirat as Siddhi kǖr.

In this regard, Mongolian linguist Tsendiin Damdinsüren noted the existence of two Tibetan compilations of Vetala tales, one with 13 chapters and the other with 21. Also, both versions were mentioned in the work The Book of the Son, written in 11th century. Lastly, the divergence in contents between the Indian Vetala and the Tibetan versions, according to Damdinsuren, may indicate the latter were original works, instead of an adaptation or translation. In the same vein, according to Tibetologist Françoise Robin, there are more than 20 versions of the compilation in the Tibetan-speaking zone alone, and their common versions contain between thirteen and twenty-five stories, with some even reaching up to 75 tales.

== Summary ==
An old couple lives with their beautiful and kind daughter. One day, a demon disguised as a prince comes to court her, but her parents, knowing his true identity, set up a test for him first: discover her true name. The demon thinks of a way to discover the girl's name, and a starving fox appears, asking for food. The demon agrees to give the animal food, in exchange for learning the girl's name. The fox goes to spy on the girl's house twice, learns her name for the demon suitor, but, on the way, the animal forgets the girl's name. On the morning following the second night, the fox learns the girl is named Soka and goes to report to the demon-prince. The creature goes to Soka's parents to reveal her name, and, just as they promised, they agree to give Soka to the demon. The next day, her parents give Soka their wise, talking horse as her companion, and Soka tells her parents she had a bad feeling about the demon. Regardless, Soka rides the horse to accompany the demon, and the horse gives her a cloth with seven seeds, to be used later. At last, Soka reaches the demon's iron castle and lives there. The demon gives her some keys and leaves. Inside the castle, Soka finds a black door which she tries to open with the set of keys, to no avail. She then finds another key on some beams and opens the door: inside, piles of bodies belonging to old women. One old woman warns her they are the demon's previous wives and victims, and she can save herself still: the old woman gives her golden and turquoise jewels, some shabby clothes and the face of another woman as disguise. Soka then escapes the demon's castle.

The demon enters the castle and, not finding his bride, rides his horse to search for her, meeting an old woman on the road (who is Soka in disguise). The old woman says she did not see anyone, and the demon departs. Soka, as an old woman, reaches another kingdom and finds work as a servant. One day, she takes the shabby clothes and old woman's mask to wash her face in the river, and is discovered by a servant of the local king. The man reports to the king, who sends for Soka. The girl tells him her story, and he promises that the demon will not come to harm her. The king marries Soka and she becomes pregnant. While the king is away, she gives birth to a son with eyes of diamond, upper body of gold and lower part of turquoise. Her husband's court believe the boy's wondrous aspect is a manifestation of a god, and write a letter to her husband. On the way, Soka's demonic former suitor falsified the letters exchanged between the king and his court, and writes a false order to banish mother and son. Thus, Soka is abandoned in the wilderness with her son and meets her demonic suitor, who asks to see her baby and devours him in one gulp, then goes in to devour Soka.

The girl, out of desperation, remembers the seven seeds her horse gave her, and tosses them to all cardinal directions. This summons the wise horse, which takes its mistress on its back to safety, away from the demon. They land in a pit and snow begins to fall, as the horse lies there, exhausted. Still, the animal tells Soka she will be happy now. The next morning, Soka finds herself inside a large palace with four towers and many servants - which the story explains was the result of "the horse's miraculous powers". Soka lives in the castle until, one day, she sights in the distance her husband approaching her castle with his army. Soka reunites with her husband, and they return home.

== Analysis ==
=== Motifs ===
According to Chilean folklorist Yolando Pino Saavedra, in some variants, the heroine is betrothed or already married to a gentleman (who is a devil in disguise), and escapes from him in a "Magical Flight" sequence. Despite the presence of the motif, these tales are not classified as type ATU 313, "The Magic Flight".

=== Relation to other tale types ===
In an article in Enzyklopädie des Märchens, narrative researcher Ines Köhler-Zülch stated that this narrative (heroine and magic horse save themselves from demonic bridegroom) may also start as tale type AaTh 621, "The Flea": her father, the king, fattens a louse and uses its hide as a suitor's riddle; a demonic bridegroom guesses it right.

Italian scholar Sebastian Lo Nigro, in his study, noted that the motif of the sequence of falsified letters harks back to tale type ATU 706, "The Maiden Without Hands".

== Variants ==
According to Hungarian orientalist László L. Lőrincz, professor Tsendiin Damdinsüren published a Tibetan language translation of The Bewitched Corpse, titled Ro-sgruṅ. Its tenth tale is titled, in the original, Bu-mo So-kha 'di-li sman-čaṅ šes rtas srin-mo'i lag-nas bral-te rgyal-srid sprad-pa'i le'u žugs (French: Comment la fille So-kha 'di-li sman-čaṅ échappa à l'aide du cheval fée au démon et obtint le trône; English: "How the girl So-kha 'di-li sman-čaṅ escaped from the devil with the help of a magical horse and gained the throne"). Lörincz also provided an abridged summary of the tale: a demon in disguise guesses the true name of the girl with the help of a fox and they marry; So-kha 'di-li sman-čaṅ rides her own magical horse away from him and marries a human king; while the king is away at war, she gives birth to a boy and writes her husband a letter; the letter is intercepted and falsified by the demon, who goes after them; the magical horse saves So-kha 'di-li sman-čaṅ and her son.

=== The Three Demon Brothers ===
Tibetologist Yuri Parfionovich published a similar tale in the compilation "Игра Веталы с человеком" ("Vetala's Game with a Man"), with the title "Три брата-демона" ("The Three Demon Brothers"), sourced from Tibet: the titular three demon brothers try to guess the heroine's name (Paradise Flower), and cheat by using a hare, a fox, and a magpie to find out her name as part of a suitor riddle. The girl, Paradise Flower, is delivered to the demon brothers and goes to their den, where she finds a cellar filled with bones. She survives by escaping to another kingdom, where she meets and marries the local king; after the king takes a leave of absence, the queen writes him a series of letters informing of the birth of their son, but the demon brothers intercept the letters and falsify them; after reading the letters, the heroine flees from her kingdom with her son and a horse. At a distance, the horse explains the heroine must sacrifice it, take its body parts and spread them around her: spread his skin on the ground, place the hooves on the four sides, pile the bones in a heap in the middle, scatter its mane in eight directions, and place the organs in a single location. Despite some reluctance, Paradise Flower fulfills the horse's request and, in the following morning, she and her son find a castle nearby. Parfionovitch later republished the tale as "Девушка и братья-демоны" ("The Girl and the Demon Brothers"), still sourced from Tibet. Author James Riordan translated the tale to English as Lotus Blossom (also the heroine's name), and also sourced it from Tibet. In another translated version, titled The Three Evil Brothers, the heroine's name is "Lhasa Flower".

=== Sokha Dilimen or the Ogre in Love ===
In a Tibetan tale translated to French with the title Sokha Dilimen ou l'ogre amoureux ("Sokha Dilimen or the Ogre in Love"), an old couple have a daughter named Sokha Dilimen, beautiful, religious who follows the Three Jewels and the Law, and comparable to a dakini. One day, she is meditating for a future event, when a large hunter, with a belt filled with dead hares and quails, comes to court the girl. The girl's mother retorts the man should say her daughter's name, which he does not know, and he returns to his abode. The following day, the hunter, who is an ogre, is chewing on a dead baby with a dead horse and a human corpse on its shoulders, when a fox appears and asks to be given some meat. The ogre agrees, but the fox should help him find the girl's name. After discovering it and falling into a hole the first time, the fox brings the information to the ogre, who dons another human disguise. He goes back to woo the girl and brings her parents gold and turquoise, then says her name is Sokha Dilimen. He returns the next day without a horse, and Sokha Dilimen tries to escape the ogre suitor by saying she is already betrothed to a man in the valley. Still, she cannot disobey her parents, and, being a Bodhisattva, she conjures up a piebald stallion called the omniscient horse. The horse warns her about the ogre suitor, gives her a talisman with seven magic seeds, and advises her to play the part of bride for now. She dismisses the horse and goes down the valley with him.

A monstrous mount orders her to climb on it, and they reach an iron castle with nine roofs and nine towers. Sokha spends her days alone, while her ogre bridegroom only returns at night. The ogre gives her a dog and some meat for company, but they devour each other; he then gives her a goat and some hay, but they eat each other. Some time later, Sokha finds a set of keys and decides to try every key on every door in the ogre's castle, seeing strange sights and mirages. She happens across a large black door, discovers its key on a beam and opens it: inside, a mountain of skeletons of the ogre's previous victims, and some of its still alive victims, old women, trapped and moaning. One of the old women sees Sokha and warns her this is what awaits her, and bids her escape by taking the skin of another elderly victim, an old black woman, as her disguise, and finding shelter with the king that lives down in the valley. Sokha does as instructed and runs away from the iron castle with the old woman's skin disguise and a bag of tsampa. The ogre returns home and, on not finding her, goes to search for her, but bumps into the old woman. She runs to a meadow and reaches the castle of the king that follows the marvellous Law, where she offers to work as a cook.

One day, Sokha Dilimen removes the old woman's skin and takes a bath in a stream, and is seen by the king, who orders his servants to bring her to him. They remove her ugly disguise and he sees Sokha's true face, then marries her. Some time later, the king, advised by his astrologers, goes on a pilgrimage to Mountain Tsâri and leave a pregnant Sokha alone in his castle. She gives birth to a wondrous child: a boy with head, heart and arms of gold, his legs of turquoise and the rest of his body in mother-of-pearl, and his brows shaped like zi. Sokha writes her husband a letter, but the ogre bridegroom intercepts the letters and writes that she gave birth to a monster with monkey's head and a donkey's body, and that the king gave a false command to exile her to the mountains. Sokha Dilimen takes her child and rides to the mountains on a red-nosed donkey. Suddenly, the ogre bridegroom appears next to her, swallows the baby and kills the asinine mount, then gloats that Sokha's child's gold and turquoise body parts were derived from the ogre's riches he gave to her parents; his "pure" mother-of-pearl parts were from the ogre's pure ideas Sokha instilled in him, and the zi characters were a nod to the notion that he never stopped looking for her. The ogre then asks her to delouse his hair. Sokha laments her situation, but takes the opportunity to rip the talisman the horse gave her with the seven seeds, which summons the omniscient horse. Sokha rides the horse on a desperate flight to a safe place, and reaches a snow-covered place, where she notices the horse is dead and mourns her fallen friend. However, the horse's voice begins to talk to her and bids her follow his instructions closely: flay its body and spread its remains, toss his brains on the peaks and spreads the mane on the slopes of the mountains, place its head in the middle of its remains, its heart and kidneys next to the head, frame its skin with the limbs and circle it with its intestines, push the eyes into the sockets, and preserve the lungs. With tears in her eyes, Sokha follows his instructions and sleeps. The following morning, Sokha wakes up near a large fortress furnished with provisions and riches and a court of people that call her their queen. Sokha then has a realization that the pieces of the horse transformed: the lungs turned into the court of people, the kidneys two mastiffs, the head into the largest tower, the heart into another horse, the liver originated meat and butter, the gallbladder created a treasure of gold, turquoise and other precious materials, the eyes provided two fountains, its mane built a forest of fruit trees. Sokha rules over this new kingdom as their queen, and a year later, her husband reaches the kingdom with the floating palace and reunites with his wife. Sokha Dilimen tells her husband the ogre devoured their son, but her omniscient horse created the kingdom from its remains. The king states her horse was more compassionate than her parents. Sokha and her husband then rule this new realm.

== See also ==
- Horse sacrifice
- The Horse Lurja
- Las barbas de plata (Spanish fairy tale)
- Calumniated Wife
- The Three Golden Children (folklore)
- Vasilisa the Priest's Daughter
- Ileana Simziana (Romanian folktale)
- The Black Colt (Iranian folkale)
- The Magician's Horse (Lithuanian folktale)
