= Yvonne Sylvain =

Haitian physician (1907–1989)

- Born: June 28, 1907; Port-au-Prince, Haiti
- Died: October 3, 1989 (aged 82)
- Awards: Haitian Medical Association Posthumously Award
- Scientific career
- Fields: Obstetrics and gynaecology

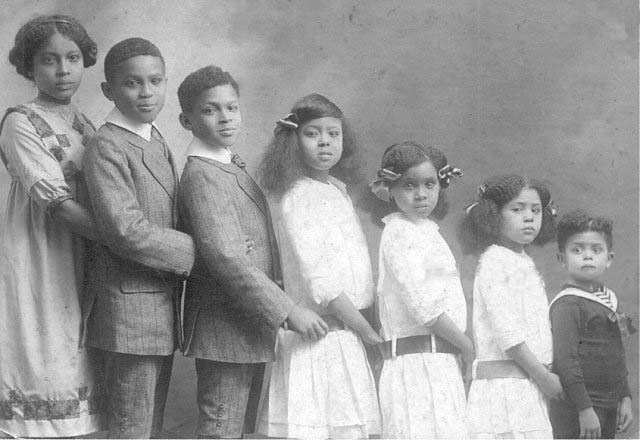
Siblings in the Sylvain family in Paris, 1912: Suzanne (1898-1975), Normil (1900-1929), Henry (1901-1991), Madeleine (1905-1970), Jeanne (1906-), Yvonne (1907-1989), Pierre (1910-1991)

Yvonne Sylvain (June 28, 1907 – October 3, 1989) was a Haitian physician who was the first female medical doctor from the country. She was also the first woman accepted into the University of Haiti Medical School, and earned her medical degree in 1940. After graduation, she worked as a specialist in obstetrics and gynecology in the Port-au-Prince General Hospital. As Haiti's first female practitioner, she played an important role in providing improved medical access and tools for Haitian citizens. Among her other accomplishments, she was also one of the voices fighting for physical, economical, social, and political equality for Haitian women.

== Early life and education ==
Dr. Yvonne Sylvain was born in Port-au-Prince to Eugénie Mallebranche and Georges Sylvain, a Haitian activist and an important figure of resistance against the American occupation of Haiti. They had seven children, one of them being Suzanne Comhaire-Sylvain, Haiti’s first woman anthropologist.

Influenced heavily by her father, she attended Ecole Normale d’institutrices, where she graduated and began to work as a teacher. At the age of 28, she was the first woman accepted into the medical school of the University of Haiti, and earned her medical degree in 1940. She then received a scholarship from the Inter-American Health Bureau and was admitted to the Columbia University Medical School. Three years after her internship, she worked at the New York Post-Graduate Medical School and Hospital on a Pan-American Sanitary Bureau Fellowship.

== Career ==
Sylvain made many contributions to the medical field in Haiti and inspired other Haitian women to follow her steps. By 1953, thirteen years after Sylvain had graduated medical school, eight Haitian women had already received their doctor of medicine degree from University of Haiti and began practicing in Haiti. At the time, the University of Haiti had 241 medical students enrolled, 17 of which were women.

Following her graduation, she worked for many years at the General Hospital in obstetrics and gynecology. The high mortality rate in Haiti inspired her to be a doctor, she invested her time and skills in treating many Haitians for various diseases. She was passionate about the immediate health problems plaguing Haitians: sterility, overpopulation, and cancer. She also became a professor of medicine at the University of Haiti. She published many articles in medical journals and continued to research about the lethal health issues occurring in Haiti.

She then became the Vice-President of the Haitian Foundation for Health and Education. Upset by Haiti’s poor means of cancer treatment, Sylvain became adamant about investing in X-rays and other medical equipment to diagnose cancer. It was her dream for more medical advancements to arrive in Haiti in order to decrease the number of Haitians dying of cancer. She was a part of the Haitian League Against Cancer and helped introduced in Haiti the papanicolaou test for uterine cancer screening. She created a special committee that helped collect funding from France and among the Haitian diaspora for a hospital that she wanted to build in Frères, a city in Haiti ten-minutes away from Pétion-Ville, in order to provide medical access to a community of over 100,000 people. Showing commitment to the cause, she remained the Vice-President of the Haitian Foundation for Health and Education until her death.

With her organization improving Haitian hospitals, she began to work as a delegate in public health, especially for the reproductive health and research for the World Health Organization (WHO). She also brought her medical knowledge to several African countries, such as Nigeria and Senegal, and worked as a doctor in Costa Rica.

== Art ==
She actively promoted Haitian culture through her art. She studied under Normil Charles and also influenced by Petion Savain. She worked heavily in the fields of art, painting, writing, art criticism, theater, and radio animation. She was a very important cultural operator for her community. Art, painting, and theater were very important interest for Yvonne Sylvain during her early stages of life because she was deeply inserted in a very cultural community. By 1932, she had exhibited over thirty oil paintings and drawings. However, the helplessness she felt from her mother’s passing inspired the 28 years of devotion to medical sciences.

== Activism ==
She was also active in the women's suffrage movement, namely in the Ligue Féminine d'Action Sociale, which helped give Haitian women the right to vote in 1950. She also published articles on public health issues in the Ligue's news outlet, La Voix des Femmes.

== Honors ==
The Haitian Medical Association (AMH) honored Sylvain posthumously as the first Haitian woman doctor.
