= Madeleine Sylvain-Bouchereau =

Haitian sociologist and educator

- Born: 1905; Port-au-Prince, Haiti
- Died: 1970 (aged 64–65)
- Education: University of Haiti, Bryn Mawr College
- Occupations: Sociologist, Educator

Madeleine Sylvain-Bouchereau (July 5, 1905 –1970) was a pioneering Haitian sociologist and educator. In 1934, she was one of the principal founders of the Ligue Féminine d'Action Sociale (Women's Social Action League), the first feminist organization registered in Haiti.

== Biography ==
Born on 5 July 1905 in Port-au-Prince, she was the daughter of the poet and diplomat Georges Sylvain and his wife Eugénie Mallebranche. A brilliant student, she was educated in Haiti, Puerto Rico and the United States, graduating in law at the University of Haiti in 1933, studying education and sociology at the University of Puerto-Rico (1936–38) and at Bryn Mawr College, Pennsylvania, where she earned a doctorate in sociology in 1941. Her thesis Haïti et ses femmes. Une étude d’évolution culturelle (Haiti and its Women. A Study of Cultural Evolution) was published in 1957.

Her academic career began in 1941 when she taught at Haiti's Ethnology Institute, continuing in 1945 at the National Agricultural School and at Fisk University. She was an Honorary Member of Delta Sigma Theta sorority. She received the Susan B. Anthony prize for her work L'Éducation des Femmes en Haïti (The Education of Women in Haiti).

With a view to improving social and economic conditions for women, together with several other women from the upper and middle classes, she established the Ligue Féminine d'Action Sociale (Feminine League for Social Action). Sylvain-Bouchereau played an important part in contributing to La Voix des Femmes, the organization's journal.

== International participation ==
Sylvain-Bouchereau's international career began in 1937 when she was the Haitian delegate at the Third Inter-American Conference on Education. She was an early participant in the work of the United Nations, arranging social services for Polish political prisoners in 1944. She sat on the first committee for women's rights and, from 1952 to 1956, assisted the Women's International League for Peace and Freedom in giving educational courses in Copenhagen and Hamburg. From 1966 to 1968, Sylvain-Bouchereau was an advisor to the Government of Togo on community development.

Sylvain-Bouchereau was one of seven notable brothers and sisters. Her elder sister, Suzanne Comhaire-Sylvain (1898-1975), was Haiti's first female anthropologist, while her younger sister, Yvonne Sylvain (1907-1989), was the country's first female doctor. Her brother, Normil Sylvain (1900-1929), founded La Revue indigène which published native Haitian poetry and Haitian literature. Her youngest brother, Pierre Sylvain (1910–1991), a botanist, reported on coffee production in Ethiopia.

Madeleine Sylvain-Bouchereau died in 1970 in New York City.

== Selected works ==
- Sylvain-Bouchereau, Madeleine (1944), Education des femmes en Haïti, Port-au-Prince, Imp. de l’Etat.
- Sylvain-Bouchereau, Madeleine (1944), Lecture Haïtienne : La Famille Renaud, Port-au-Prince, Editions Henri Deschamps.
- Sylvain-Bouchereau, Madeleine (1946), "Les Droits des femmes et la nouvelle Constitution", in La Femme haïtienne répond aux attaques formulées contre elle à l’Assemblée constituante, Port-au-Prince, Société d’Editions et de Librairie.
- Sylvain-Bouchereau, Madeleine (1950), "La Classe moyenne en Haïti", in Matériaux pour l’étude de la classe moyenne en Amérique Latine, Washington, Département des Sciences sociales de l’union panaméricaine.
- Sylvain-Bouchereau, Madeleine (1957), Haïti et ses femmes. Une étude d’évolution culturelle, Port-au-Prince, Les Presses Libres.
