= Georges Sylvain =

Haitian poet, lawyer and diplomat

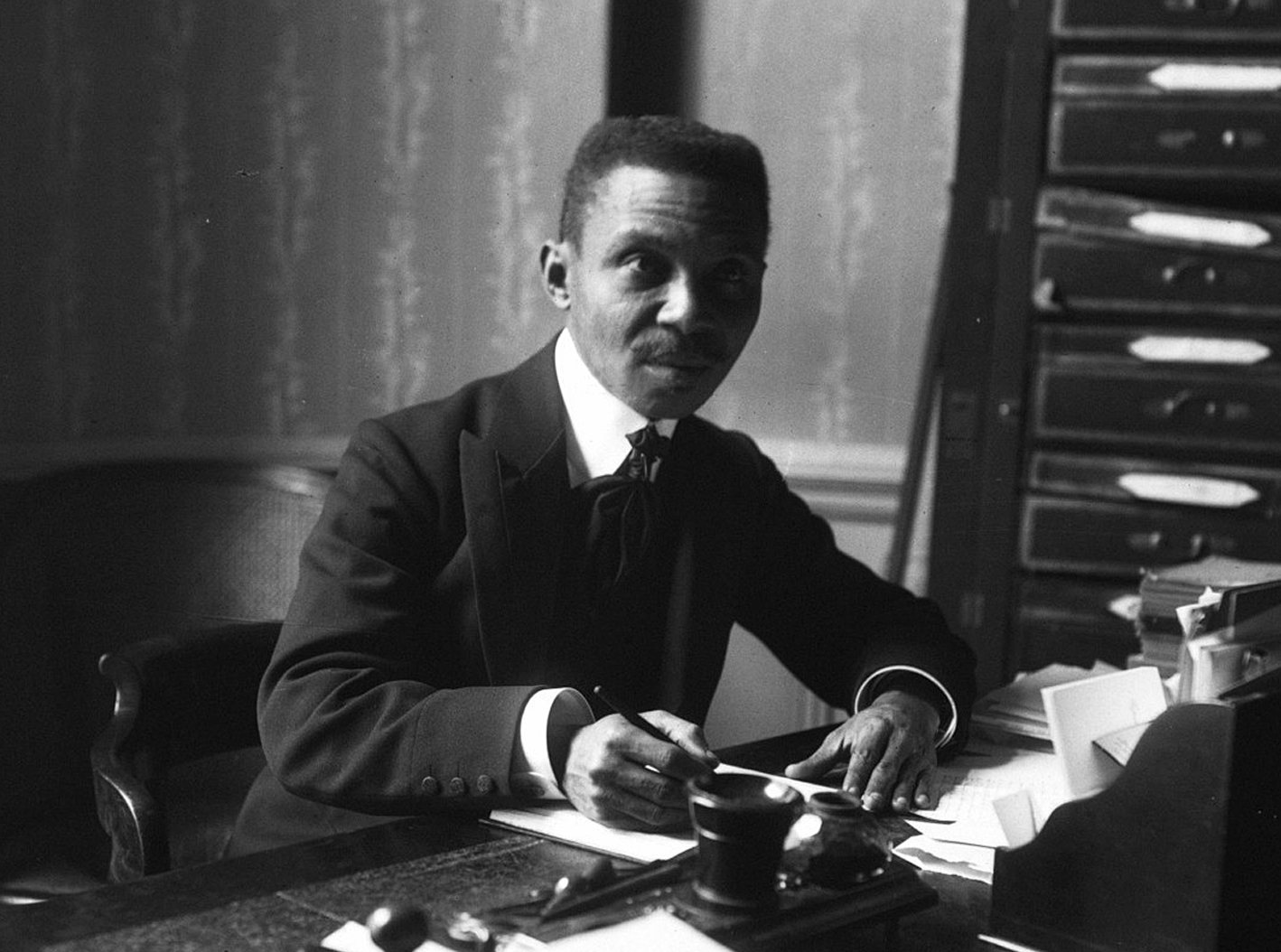
Georges Sylvain

Georges Sylvain (1866–1925) was a Haitian poet, lawyer and diplomat. Born in Puerto Plata, Dominican Republic, Sylvain studied in his native city before attending school in Paris, where he received a law degree. After returning to Haiti, he founded a law school and two periodicals, La Patrie and, in 1922, l'Union Patriotique. He was a member of the literary society La Ronde and was involved in other literary activities. He published Confidences et Mélancolies (1901), a compilation of twenty-nine poems.

He was the father of the anthropologist Suzanne Comhaire-Sylvain, physician Yvonne Sylvain, and the sociologist and feminist Madeleine Sylvain-Bouchereau.
