= Suzanne Comhaire-Sylvain =

Haitian anthropologist

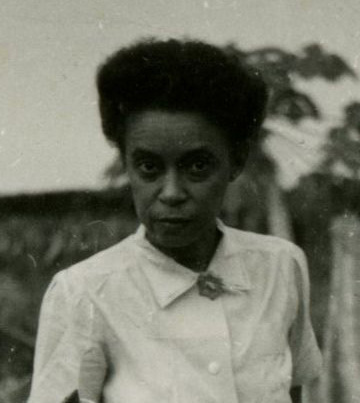
- Suzanne Comhaire-Sylvain
- Born: November 6, 1898; Port-au-Prince, Haiti
- Died: June 20, 1975 (aged 76); Nigeria
- Occupations: Folklorist, anthropologist, ethnographer
- Spouse: Jean Comhaire (m. 1927; div. 1975)
- Writing career
- Period: c. 1935–1975

Suzanne Comhaire-Sylvain (6 November 1898 – 20 June 1975) was the first woman Haitian anthropologist. Suzanne Comhaire-Sylvain was a student of Bronisław Malinowski who worked in 1949 with Alfred Métraux, and participated in a UNESCO project in Haiti. She married Jean Comhaire, a Belgian who headed the Anthropology Department of University of Nsukka. Subsequently, she worked in Africa.

== Biography ==
Comhaire-Sylvain was born on 6 November 1898 in Port-au-Prince, Haiti. She was the daughter of Georges Sylvain, Haitian activist and symbol of the resistance against the American Occupation, and of Eugénie Malbranche.

Comhaire-Sylvain studied in Kingston and Port-au-Prince before she obtained her bachelor's degree and Doctorate in Paris. Besides her interest in Haitian folklore and social issues of the condition of women in Haiti and Africa, her research focused on the origins of Creole language, an idiom considered juvenile and worthless at that time. Comhaire-Sylvain had chosen a difficult path; however, her work, disregarded by her peers, sparked the interest of famous Polish anthropologist Bronisław Malinowski. Malinowski invited Comhaire-Sylvain to London; during her time there, she became her research assistant while studying at London University and later at the London School of Economics. She also conducted successful research at the British Museum that resulted in her major work regarding the African roots of Haitian Creole.

Comhaire-Sylvain conducted field research in Kenscoff and Marbial (Haiti), Kinshasa (Congo), Lomé (Togo) and Nsukka (Nigeria) and worked with renowned anthropologists such as Melville Herskovits and Alfred Métraux, who entrusted her and her husband with a mission of the UNESCO in Haiti. Comhaire-Sylvain also taught at the New School for Social Research in New York, was an early recipient of a Guggenheim fellowship, and was appointed a member of the United Nations trusteeship council for Togo and Cameroon under French administration.

Comhaire-Sylvain came from a very notable family in Haiti. Her uncle Benito Sylvain was one of the founding fathers of Pan-Africanism and her father Georges Sylvain (1866–1925) was an important figure of the resistance against the American occupation in Haiti. Comhaire-Sylvain was the oldest of a family of seven. Her sister Yvonne Sylvain (1907–1989) was the first Haitian woman physician and the first gynecologist-obstetrician of the country. Many of her articles were published in the magazine Voix des femmes (Women's Voices). Their brother Normil Sylvain (1900–1929) was a poet and co-founder in 1927 of La Revue indigène. Comhaire-Sylvain's sister Madeleine Sylvain (1905–1970) was one of the founders of the Ligue Feminine d’Action Sociale (Feminine League for Social Action), which fought for women's legal rights such as equality for married women. Finally, her youngest brother Pierre Sylvain (1910–1991) was a botanist who published several reports on coffee production in Ethiopia.

Comhaire-Sylvain died in a car accident in Nigeria on 20 June 1975. As of 2014, her papers had been catalogued and made available through Stanford University Libraries.

== Selected published works ==
Comhaire-Sylvain's work (including more than 200 articles) was awarded numerous distinctions. These distinctions include the Prix de l'Alliance Française (The French Alliance Prize), "La Médaille de l'Académie Française" (The Medal of the French Academy), "La Grande Médaille de l'Alliance Française et La Médaille de la Société pour l'Encouragement du Progrès" (The French Alliance Medal and the Medal of the Society for Encouragement and Progress).

- 1937. Les contes haiïtiens (Ière partie): Maman D'leau. Suzanne Comhaire-Sylvain; Université de Paris, Faculté des letters. [Thesis/Dissertation : Microfiche : Master microform]. Paris: s.n., 1937; Wetteren (Belgique): Imprimerie De Messter.
- 1937a. Les contes haïtiens (IIème partie): conjoint animal ou démon déguisé. Suzanne Comhaire-Sylvain. [Thesis/Dissertation : Microfiche : Master microform. publisher: s.n: Paris.
- 1937b. Les contes haïtiens. (I-II). Suzanne Comhaire-Sylvain; Thesis /Dissertation. Publisher: Paris; Wetteren (Belgique) : Imprimerie De Messter.
- 1937c. Review of: Le Créole Haïtien, Morphologie et Syntaxe Review of: Les Contes Haitiens (I partie), IIe Partie by C G Woodson, Suzanne Comhaire-Sylvain, Suzanne Comhaire-Sylvain [Article]; language: English; publication: Journal of Negro History, July, Vol. 22, No. 3, p. 369–372.
- 1938. A propos du vocabulaire des croyances paysannes. Suzanne Comhaire-Sylvain. Port-au-Prince, Haiti.
- 1938a. Contes du pays d'Haïti. Suzanne Comhaire-Sylvain. Port-au-Prince, Haiti.
- 1938b. Loisirs et divertissements dans la région de Kenscoff, Haïti. Suzanne Comhaire-Sylvain, Jean Comhaire-Sylvain.Travaux Publics: Bruxelles.
- 1940. Le roman de Bouqui. Suzanne Comhaire-Sylvain. Imprimerie du Collège Vertières: Port-au-Prince, Haiti.
- 1952. La alimentación en la región de Kenscoff, Haiti. Suzanne Comhaire-Sylvain, Jean Comhaire-Sylvain. América Indígena: México, D.F.
- 1953. Haitian Creole: grammar, texts, vocabulary. Robert Anderson Hall; Suzanne Comhaire-Sylvain, Alfred Métraux. American folklore society: Philadelphia; American Anthropological Ass.: Menasha, Wis.; American Folklore Society: New York, Kraus Reprint, 1969.
- 1959. Naissance, mort, état-civil à Kenscoff, Haïti. Suzanne Comhaire-Sylvain, Jean Louis Léopold Comhaire. Bruxelles.
- 1959a. Urban stratification in Haiti. Suzanne Comhaire-Sylvain, J. Comhaire-Sylvain. Institute of Social and Economic Research, University College of the West Indies: Kingston (?), Jamaica, W.I.
- 1962. Considérations sur les migrations à Addis Abeba [preparé pour le College Universitaire d'Addis Abeba]. Suzanne Comhaire-Sylvain. S.L.: S.N. Distr. Restreinte.
- 1964. A statistical note on the Kenscoff market system, Haiti. Suzanne Comhaire-Sylvain, J. Comhaire-Sylvain. Institute of Social and Economic Research, University of the West Indies: Kingston, Jamaica.
- 1968. Femmes de Kinshasa hier et aujourd'hui. Suzanne Comhaire-Sylvain. Microfilm. Le Haye /Mouton: Paris.
- 1970. Le Nouveau dossier Afrique. Situation et perspectives d'un continent. Suzanne Comhaire-Sylvain, Jean Louis Léopold Comhaire. Verviers, Gérard & Co, 1970, ©1971; by Suzanne Comhaire-Sylvain, Jean Comhaire, Fernand Bezy, Francis Olu Okediji, Pierre L. Van den Berghe, Amadou Mahtar M'Bow. Verviers: Marabout, 1975..
- 1974. Jetons nos couteaux!: contes des garçonnets de Kinshasa et quelques parallèles haïtiens. Suzanne Comhaire-Sylvain. Centre d'Etudes Ethnologiques: Bandundu, Zaïre.
- 1975(?). Contes haïtiens : textes intégrales créole-français. Suzanne Comhaire-Sylvain. CEEBA: Bandundu, Zaire.
- 1979. Le Créole haïtien. Suzanne Comhaire-Sylvain. Slatkine Reprints: Genève.
- 1982. Femmes de Lomé. Suzanne Comhaire-Sylvain.. CEEBA: Bandundu, Zaire; Steyler Verlag (distributor): St. Augustin, Rép. féd. d'Allemagne.
- 1982a. Mai-ndombe: paysages, histoire, culture (Rép. du Zaïre). Suzanne Comhaire-Sylvain et al.. CEEBA: Bandundu, Zaire.
- 1984. Les montagnards de la région de Kenscoff (Rép. d'Haïti): une société Kongo au-delà des mers. Suzanne Comhaire-Sylvain, Jean Comhaire. CEEBA: Bandundu, Zaïre.
- 1991. Cric? crac! : contes du pays d'Haiti. Suzanne Comhaire-Sylvain, Casimir; Maruzen Mates, et al. Maruzen Mates: Tokyo.

== See also ==
- Timeline of women in science
