= Ines Köhler-Zülch =

German folklorist and human rights activist (1941–2019)

Ines Köhler-Zülch (1941–2019) was a German folklorist and human rights activist. She is remembered for her contributions from 1974 to the Encyclopedia of Fairy Tales (Enzyklopädie des Märchens). Her work focused in particular on sagas and fairy tales from southeastern Europe. Backing her husband Tilman Zülch who founded the Society for Threatened Peoples, she created a regional group in Göttingen campaigning for the rights of ethnic and religious minorities. She provided support for refugees from Bangladesh, Biafra, East Timor, Guatemala, Iraq and Bosnia until she suffered from serious illness in 2017.

== Early life and education ==
Born during World War II on 10 June 1941 in Magdeburg, Ines Köhler experienced first the German Democratic Republic and later the German Federal Republic, She began her studies in Marburg, focusing initially on Latin. She then moved to Hamburg where she studied Slavic languages, especially Bulgarian, as well as Romance languages, including Romanian and German. In this connection, she spent half a year at the Bulgarian National Library in Sofia as well as several months in Romania at the university libraries of Bucharest, Iași and Cluj. She graduated in 1972.

== Career ==
During her studies in Hamburg, in 1969 she took part in activities in support of Biafra (Biafrahilfe) and in 1970 in the closely related Society for Threatened Peoples, founded by Tilman Zülch whom she later married. In 1974, she moved to Göttingen in order to contribute to research in connection with the Encyclopedia of Fairy Tales. There she established the first regional group of the Society for Threatened Peoples in 1974, recruiting campaigners to fight for the rights of ethnic and religious minorities. Thanks to her success, her husband was able to rely on her developments when he moved to Göttingen. She went on to organize visits to German of American Indians from North and Latin America, allowing them to reveal details of their mistreatment. She also made a significant contribution to the Third World Romani Congress which was held in Göttingen in 1981.

Köhler-Zülch spent a total of 32 years at the Göttingen Academy of Sciences and Humanities editing the Encyclopedia of Fairy Tales, in particular in connection with research in southeastern Europe on old and ancient sagas and stories.

Ines Köhler-Zülch died in Göttingen on 24 April 2019 after suffering from a lengthy illness.
