= The Serpent Prince =

Hungarian folk tale about a snake bridegroom

The Serpent Prince or The Snake Prince (Hungarian: Kégyókirályfi or Kígyókirályfi) is a Hungarian folk tale collected by Hungarian-American scholar Linda Dégh, featuring the marriage between a human maiden and a husband in serpent guise.

The tale is related to the international cycle of the Animal as Bridegroom or The Search for the Lost Husband: a human maiden marries an animal that is a prince in disguise, breaks a taboo and loses him, and she has to seek him out. The story shares motifs with other tales of the region, like Serbian Again, The Snake Bridegroom, and Romanian Trandafiru, The Enchanted Pig and Enchanted Balaur: the heroine must search for her husband under a curse not to bear their child until he touches her again. According to Hungarian scholars, the snake appears as the form of the enchanted husband in most of the Hungarian variants.

== Sources ==
Dégh collected the tale in the 1950s from Hungarian teller Zsuzsanna Pálkó (Józscfné Palkó), a member of the Székely Bukovina community who lived in Kakasd village, Tolna County.

== Summary ==
Pálkó's narration begins thus: a king complains to his wife that she has not born him any child. The queen questions why God has not given her children, and asks for a snake son, so that they may finally have offspring. Just as she says it, a snake son appears. The king declares they must hide the animal from prying eyes, so that no one may know they have a snake son.

They hide the animal son in a room and he grows up there. Years later, when he has grown very large, he begins to whistle so loud it shakes the castle. His mother pays him a visit to question what is the reason for the whistling. He explains he has come of age and desires a mate, and suggests the princess of a neighbouring kingdom shall be the perfect candidate.

So his mother summons the princess and she comes to the castle to find out more about her prospective husband. The queen leads the princess into the prince's quarters. When she sees the giant snake, she screams and faints. The queen sprinkles some water on her, who comes to, and explains the prince is the snake, albeit a harmless one. The princess refuses to marry the snake prince and tries to escape the room, whose windows are barred with iron. The queen and the king lock her up with the snake prince and leave them be.

This situation goes for a week: the princess tries to think of a way out, but everywhere she looks the windows and the doors are barred. She does not even touch her food, choosing to wither away slowly than marrying the snake. Despite his bride's grievances, the snake prince tries to convince the girl he means no harm to her. He then begins to crawl into their bridal bed, to the princess's horror. For two nights, she tries to sneak away from him, somewhat successfully.

The third night, after a quick rest, she wakes up to a handsome man beside her. She wakes the man up and question his presence there: he tells her he is the snake, but wears a snakeskin at night "because he has too", since it is his "cloak". The princess feels more at ease and they live as husband and wife, she becoming pregnant some time later.

Despite the revelation, the prince does not show his parents his human form, which annoys the princess. She visits a sorceress nearby and tells her her situation. The sorceress advises her to take the snakeskin and burn it in the stove.

That night, when the snake prince is asleep, the princess wakes up, takes the snakeskin off of him. She creeps into the kitchen, lights up the stove and tosses the skin in. She returns to her chambers to an awakened prince, who asks her about the smell of burning. She lies that it is only some tufts of her hair burning, but he knows she is lying. The prince then explains that he was to wear the cloak for one more month, and curses her not to bear their children until he embraces her again; and that a ring on her finger shall stay there until he puts his finger on her. He then gives her a dry hazel-rod she must water with her tears until it bears fruit, and a grain of wheat she must plant and with the harvest bake a bread; then she can go after him. Then he vanishes.

The princess tells her parents-in-law that the snake prince has disappeared, and goes to water the dry hazel-rod and the grain of wheat. After a long time, she takes the rod and the bread and starts a journey. In a forest, she sees a light in the distance - an old woman (the mother of the Moon)'s house, where she takes shelter for the night. Her son comes home and is inquired about the whereabouts of the Serpent Prince. The old woman directs the princess to her aunt, and gives her a gold bobbin.

The situation repeats twice in the next two houses (of the Sun and of the Winds), and she gains a golden reel and a golden spool and ball of thread; only on the third house she finally learns where her husband is: the Hurricane Wind tells her he went to his castle and he can take her there.

The princess arrives at the castle and wanders about with the gold bobbin. A maidservant appears and guides the girl to the queen, who is interested in the golden item and wishes to buy it. The princess offers it in exchange for a night in the king's chambers. She enters the chambers and begs her husband to awake and see her. She fails and weeps bitterly until dawn, when the queen expels her from the room. The second night goes much the same.

On the third day, the king's valet tells him that a woman has come to his chambers and wept at his bedside, but he could not respond. The king surmises he was drugged with a sleeping potion, and asks his valet to pour any drink he receives out in the bath. The princess sells her the golden thread, hoping she can wake him up. She enters the room and begs her husband to wake up and touch her breast. He does and she gives birth to their children: two golden-haired boys.

The queen enters the room, intending to expel the woman, but the king orders the guards to seize her and lock her up in a cell. The king summons his advisers, who counsel him that a wedded woman is better that an unwed one. He stays with the princess and his two sons, and punishes the queen.

== Analysis ==
=== Tale type ===
The tale is classified in the Aarne-Thompson-Uther Index as type ATU 425A, "The Animal (Monster) as Bridegroom". In this tale type, the princess burns the husband's animal skin and she must seek him out, even paying a visit to the Sun, the Moon and the Wind and gaining their help. In tale type ATU 425A, the heroine journeys far and wide to encounter her husband, and finds him at the mercy of a second spouse. The supernatural husband, now human, is put to sleep by the magic potion of the second spouse, so that the heroine has no chance of rescuing him.

Others of this type include The Black Bull of Norroway, The Brown Bear of Norway, The Daughter of the Skies, East of the Sun and West of the Moon, The Tale of the Hoodie, The Sprig of Rosemary, and White-Bear-King-Valemon.

Similarly, the Hungarian Folktale Catalogue (MNK) indexes it as type AaTh 425A, Ámor és Psükhé ("Amor and Psyche"): the heroine marries an animal husband that is human underneath the animal skin, burns the animal skin, and loses him; to get him back, she travels to the houses of the Mother of the Sun, the Mother of the Moon and the Mother of the Wind, and gains objects she uses to bribe the false bride for a night with her husband.

=== Motifs ===
==== The serpent son ====
According to Hungarian scholar Ágnes Kovács, in Magyar Néprajzi Lexikon ("Hungarian Ethnographic Dictionary"), in Hungary, the son is born due to the rash desire of their mother in the shape of an animal, appearing like a snake, a pig, a hound or a foal (in type 425), or the poor old couple adopts the first animal that appears in their way: a hedgehog (in type 441). In that regard, Ilona Nagy states that the serpent prince's name "usually" appears as Kígyóraj vitéz, Kígyó Sebestyén, Kígyókirály Kis Jancsi, among others.

==== The heroine's helpers ====
In a study published posthumously, Romanian folklorist Petru Caraman noted that, in Romanian and in some South Slavic variants, instead of meeting the Sun, the Moon and the Wind on the way to her husband, the heroine finds incarnations of the days of the week, like Holy Wednesday and Holy Friday. They function the same as the elements and gift the heroine with golden objects. Also, according to Hungarian scholar Ágnes Kovács, the heroine's helpers are three old ladies: the mother of the Sun, the mother of the Moon and the Mother of the Wind in Hungarian variants, and Holy Friday, Holy Saturday and Holy Sunday in Romania.

==== The heroine's gifts ====
According to Hans-Jörg Uther, the main feature of tale type ATU 425A is "bribing the false bride for three nights with the husband". In fact, when he developed his revision of Aarne-Thompson's system, Uther remarked that an "essential" trait of the tale type ATU 425A was the "wife's quest and gifts" and "nights bought". In the same vein, according to Hungarian scholar Ágnes Kovács, in Magyar Néprajzi Lexikon ("Hungarian Ethnographic Dictionary"), the heroine is cursed by her husband not to bear their children until he touches her again. In her search for him, she passes by the houses of the Mothers of the Sun, of the Moon and of the Wind (or Holy Friday, Holy Saturday and Holy Sunday), where she gains (golden) apparatuses: a distaff, a spindle, and a bobbin, which she uses to trade for a night in the prince's chambers.

==== The heroine's pregnancy ====
In Balkanic variants of the tale type, the supernatural husband curses his wife not to give birth to their child for a long period of time until she finds him again. In addition, according to Lithuanian professor Bronislava Kerbelyte, similar tales from Hungary, Romania and Moldova contain the motif of the supernatural husband wrapping iron hoops around the heroine's belly so she cannot give birth to their child until he lays a hand on her again.

In this regard, Hungarian scholar Ákos Dömötör, in the 1988 revised edition of the Hungarian Folktale Catalogue, separated this motif under a second typing indexed as AaTh 425L, Abroncs a Testen ("Rings on Body"): the husband places iron rings around the heroine's body so she is unable to give birth until he touches her again. Despite its own typing, Dömötör remarked that it is "identical" to type AaTh 425A (see above).

=== Interpretations ===
Linda Dégh also saw a sexual component in the character of the snake bridegroom in the Hungarian variants. In the same vein, researcher Donald Ward observed an erotic element "in almost every variant" of the tale type: the defloration of a virgin by a phallic-shaped monster.

Dégh also remarked that these tales refer to a patriarchal peasant order: the preference for a male firstborn; the arranged marriage for women; the double marriage of the male character.

== Variants ==
According to Hungarian scholarship, ethnographer Janos Berze Nágy dubbed type AaTh 425A in Hungary as Kígyóvőlegény ("The Serpent Bridegroom"), due to the serpent appearing in 12 of 26 variants available in his lifetime. Similarly, according to Hungarian folklorist Ágnes Kovács, most of the Hungarian variants about an animal bridegroom involve the serpent prince (tale type AaTh 425A).

Dégh stated that she analysed some 40 Hungarian variants of type ATU 425A and concluded that the "Hungarian ethnic redaction" of the type "always" featured the snake as the supernatural husband. In a later study, Dégh claimed that the Hungarian ethnic redaction was "remarkably consistent": the snake is the animal bridegroom "in all cases", barring a few variants wherein the supernatural bridegroom is a pig or a dog.

Dégh located the first recorded variant in Hungary in 1822. According to Hungarian scholarship, literary influence should be taken into consideration in regards to the diffusion of the tale type AaTh 425A in Hungary post-18th century.

=== Tales with snake husband ===
==== The Snakeprince (Gaal) ====
In a Hungarian tale published by author Gyorgy Gaal with the title Der Schlangenprinz ("The Snakeprince"), a childless royal couple wish to have a son. One day, the queen sights a snake youngling and utters aloud she wishes to have a son, even if he is a snake. Thus, one snake is born to them. A sorcerer divines that the snake prince can remove his skin after his marriage, and every night after, but he must be careful not to lose it. Some time later, a princess is sent to marry the snake. He becomes a human at night, and the princess takes his snakeskin to burn it. For this betrayal, the snake prince curses his wife not to give birth to their child until he meets him again and ask for his forgiveness, the same moment the metal shoes will fall off her feet. The snake prince departs to an island and meets the local queen, who marries him. Back to the princess, she takes a long journey, passing by the houses of the Moon, the Sun and the Wind. At the house of the Moon, the mother of the Moon gives her a golden spindle; at the house of the Sun, the mother of the Sun gives her a golden "motollát", and lastly the mother of the Wind, at his house, gives the princess a golden hen with chicks. The Wind knows about her husband's location and takes her there. After the arrives on the island, the princess takes out the golden objects to draw the attention of the local queen, and trades the items for a night in the snake prince's chambers, each item for each night. For the first two nights, the princess cannot wake her husband. On the morning of the third day, a loyal servant warns the prince a girl goes to his room at night and cries over him, so he avoids drinking the wine that is offered him the third night. On the third night, the princess begs for the snake prince to touch her belly, he wakes up and touches her, allowing her to give birth to their child.

==== The Serpent-Prince (Gaal) ====
In a tale published by György Gaal with the title A kigyó-királyfi ("The Serpent-Prince"), a childless royal couple longs to have a child of their own. One day, an old woman brings a bouquet of flowers that the queen smells. She becomes pregnant and gives birth to a snake. They decide to keep it alive instead of killing it. Years later, the snake whistles from a tree. The king wonders why, but the old woman explains the snake wants to be married. The royal couple finds him a princess that he soon kills. They find later him a poor peasant girl from that town whom he marries and treats kindly. The girl notices her husband takes off the snakeskin at night and becomes a handsome prince. The queen mother learns of this through her daughter-in-law, steals the snakeskin and burns it in the oven. The snake prince wakes up, realizes the situation and curses his wife not to give birth until he puts his hand on her. He vanishes to the Fairy Realm and marries the Fairy Queen. Meanwhile, his human wife decides to go after him. She passes by the King of the Winds, the Castle of Moon and the Castle of the Day, and gains a golden spindle, a golden spinning wheel and a third golden instrument. She reaches the palace of the Fairy Queen and trades the golden objects for three nights with her husband. The human wife begs for her husband to let her give birth to their golden-haired child.

==== The Snakeskin ====
In Hungarian variant A kigyóbör (Die Schlangenhaut or "The Snakeskin"), collected by László Merényi and translated by Elisabeth Rona-Sklárek, a poor woman prays to God for a son, even if it is a half-man, half-snake child. Thus she bears a son as she described. Eighteen years pass, the snake son grows and talks to his mother that he want to marry the local king's daughter, she who is famed for her beauty. His mother goes to the king to tell him of her son's proposal, and the king wants as a wedding gift a basket of gem-made flowers and golden apples. The poor mother returns to her poor hut and tells her son about it. The son asks his mother to wait outside, takes off his snakeskin and shakes it seven times: magical servants appear to get the requested items. The mother delivers the basket to the princess and her father asks for a golden bridge to be built overnight between both their houses - which is also accomplished. That night, the princess dreams of a handsome man on her bed, and, when she wakes up, she finds a strand of golden hair and a golden scale on her bed. The king consents to their marriage, but they have to wait three days. The snake son uses this time to summon his magical servants to prepare the couple's castle, a wedding retinue for his bride, a magnificent bride's dress and a splendid carriage. After they marry, the snake husband takes off his skin, becomes a man and tells his human bride his secret: he truly is a human man underneath the snakeskin. Some time later, the princess is pregnant and tells her mother his secret, and the queen convinces her to burn the snakeskin. She follows through with the instructions and tosses the snakeskin into the oven. As the snakeskin burns, the magical servants also burn with it, and sing a lament before disappearing. The snake husband notices the loss of the snakeskin and curses his wife not to give birth until he embraces her again. In return, she curses him that three drops of her spilled blood, staining his white shirt, will not be washed save by her own hands. The husbands then vanishes in a puff of smoke. Seven years, seven months, seven days pass, and the princess goes on a quest for her husband: she passes by the houses of the Mother of the Moon, the Mother of the Sun, the Mother of the Wind, and gains two goldfishes, a golden cup and two golden spindles, and lastly a golden yarn. The princess takes a ride on the back of the Wind and goes to the palace of the false bride. The princess washes her husband's bloodied shirt in the lake. Her husband puts his hand on her breast and she gives birth to their children: a pair of golden-haired twins, a boy and a girl, one with the sun, the other with a star on the front.

==== A small snake from the mud ====
Hungarian linguist Antal Hoger collected the tale A sárig kicsi kígyó ("A small snake from the mud"), from a Csángo source. In this tale, a poor couple does not have any children. One morning, the wife tells her husband about a dream she had: in her dream, an old man says they have to stand outside the house and get the first animal that passes by them as their son. The man stays outside and takes a small snake as their son. One day, the snake tells their parents he wants a bride, and says he wants the king's daughter as his wife. The snake's father goes to the king and make a bid for his daughter. The king agrees, but orders three tasks before he allows the marriage: first, he wants three golden apples from the garden of Tündér Ilona (Fairy Ilona); next, to build a palace in place of their poor hut; and finally to connect both palaces with a golden bridge and a golden chain, with golden birds singing alongside it. The snake fulfills all tasks and weds the princess, who cries over her marriage with the snake. However, on the wedding night, the snake slithers to the princess's room and takes off the snakeskin, becoming a man. He explains his father cursed him to wear a snakeskin for seven years, seven months and seven days, and that the secret must stay between them. The next morning, the princess tells her mother that her snake husband is a man. The queen orders an old maidservant to hide in the couple's room at night and steal the snakeskin. The maidservant obeys the queen's orders. The prince awakens the next day and sees that the snakeskin is nowhere to be seen. He tells his wife they need to separate, ties a golden ring around her belly, and tells her to go to his kingdom, stand outside his window and shout at him for seven days and seven nights - the remaining time of his curse. The princess follows him to his father's kingdom, stays under his window and shouts for him to come take off the golden ring around her belly. The curse is lifted and the princess and prince live happily.

==== Snake Johnny ====
In a Hungarian tale collected by Hungarian historian Arnold Ipolyi with the title Kígyó Jancsi (Snake Johnny), a rich couple in a village is childless, and the woman makes a wish to have a son, even if he is a creeping snake. Thus, a snake is born to them. When he is fifteen years old, he climbs a tree and begins to whistle. His mother asks the reason for this, and he replies he wants to get marries, and chooses a neighbouring girl named Örzsikét. They marry and, during the wedding feast, the snake places his head on her lap, but the girl kicks him away. In retaliation, he bites her to death on the wedding night. Next, he marries Julis, the daughter of a judge. She also rebuffs him during the wedding feast and dies for her actions. The third time, the snake son asks his parents to find him the most beautiful girl in the village. They bring him a girl named Mariska, who treats him with kindness and allows him to place his head on her lap. After seven months, the snake's mother asks Mariska how she can live with a snake for a husband, but Mariska tells her that he is human underneath the snakeskin, although he wears it again in the morning. Thus, his mother suggests she steals the snakeskin and give it to her, so his mother can burn it in an oven. Their plan is carried out in the same night. The next morning, the now human snake son tries to find his snakeskin, and admonishes his wife for doing it; he pricks his hand on a pin, so that three drops of blood fall on his shirt, then embraces Mariska and places three iron rings around her body, cursing that she will only be released after he kisses her again, then vanishes. Mariska then begins a quest for him: she passes by the house of the Sun and his mother (where she gains a golden distaff) and the house of the Moon and his mother (where she gains a golden spindle and a golden rod). Lastly, she reaches the house of the mother of the Wind, and learns her husband is to be married to another princess. Mariska finally reaches the princess's castle and offers her services as a maidservant. One day, she takes out the golden objects and bribes the princess for three nights with her husband. Anticipating Mariska's plans, the princess gives a sleeping draught to Jancsi, who cannot be stirred awake. The next day, the servants are trying to wash the bloodied shirt, which Mariska offers to do. She washes the shirt and the princess shows the results to Jancsi, who wishes to see this girl. However, the princess gives him another potion for the second night. The third night, he avoids drinking the potion and talks to Mariska, his true wife, whom he embraces and marries again. As for the princess, she gains the golden spinning instruments, and the tale ends.

==== Kígyóraj vitéz ====
In a Hungarian tale collected by Gyula Istvanffy from a Palóc source with the title Kígyóraj vitéz, a king suffers for not having a son. One day, he and the queen stroll through the palace gardens and hear something rustling under a bush. The queen prays to God to grant them a son just like the species of anything that comes out of the bush. Suddenly, a snake slithers off from under the bush. The monarchs adopt the little snake as their son and raise him. After eighteen years, the snake, called Kígyóraj vitéz, asks his father to find him a bride. The king searches high and low for a suitable bride for the snake son, but no family agrees to a possible marriage. The snake son then tells the queen about a widow with seven daughters, and asks his mother to court one of them on his behalf. The queen meets with the widow and asks the girls which each would do if they found him in an angry state: the elder six say they would shoo him away, but the youngest say she would caress and hold him until his anger subsided. For her words, the girl is taken to be married to the snake son. Some time later, the queen asks her daughter-in-law about the snake son, and the girl reveals he takes off the snakeskin at night to become a handsome youth. The queen orders a servant to heat up the oven and to burn her son's snakeskin. It happens thus, but Kígyóraj vitéz senses the burning smell and wakes up. He then admonishes his wife for betraying him, and curses her not to bear their children until he places his arm around her again, then vanishes. The girl goes after him, and starts a long journey: after three days and three nights, she passes by the house of the Moon and his mother, but they have not seen Kígyóraj vitéz. Despite having no answers, the mother of the Moon gifts her a golden chair and a golden distaff. The girl then passes by the house of the Sun and his mother, who, despite not knowing the location of Kígyóraj vitéz, gives the girl a golden spindle. Lastly, she reaches the house of the Wind and his mother. The Wind knows Kígyóraj vitéz's location, in a castle across the sea, and promises to take her there. The mother of the wind gives her a golden "motollát" (Spinner's weasel), and the Wind carries her off over the sea. The pair flies for seven days, when they stop to rest, and the Wind advises her to break some branches of a tree, so she can throw them in the sea and create islands for the Wind to rest on. After a long journey, the girl goes to the marketplace, sits on the golden chair and draws out the golden objects. A servant of the local queen sights the golden objects and wishes to buy them for his mistress. The girl trades the golden objects for three nights with Kígyóraj vitéz, one item for each night. For the first two nights, she cannot wake her husband up, for the queen has put some sleeping powder on his drink. After two nights, the man notices his shirt is soaked with tears, and his servant named Jancsi alerts him about a strange visitor in his chambers. The last night, he avoids drinking the wine, and waits for the newcomer. The girl comes into the room and begs for him to wake up and touch her belly. Kígyóraj vitéz wakes up and touches her, allowing her to give birth to their children, a pair of male twins. The queen enters his room and finds Kígyóraj vitéz embracing his wife and sons, and explodes in anger.

==== The Prince in Snakeskin ====
In a Hungarian tale collected from a source in the Uz valley with the title Kígyóhéjú királyfi ("The Prince in Snakeskin"), a couple have no son, and suffer for this. One day, the woman goes to the forest, points to a coiled snake and wishes aloud that she could have a son, even it is a coiled snake, for the creature will be hers. Thus, a snake is born to her. As the years pass, the snake grows larger, until, one day, asks his mother to find a bride for him. The woman travels to a village beyond some mountains and meets a man with his three daughters. The woman takes the elder girl to the snake, and tells her she is marrying a snake. The bride-to-be expresses her horror. Thus, on the wedding night, the snake kills the elder sister. The same fate befalls the middle sister, who expressed her horror and disgust at marrying the animal. The youngest daughter, however, resigns to her fate as a snake's bride, and survives the night. Some time later, the snake's mother asks the girl about the snake son, and the girl reveals he takes off the snakeskin at night to become a handsome youth. The snake's mother wishes to see her son's true form, and tells her daughter-in-law to feign illness and ask to be covered with the snakeskin to regain her health, all the while keeping some hidden embers to burn the disguise. It happens thus, and the girl tricks her husband, then gives the snakeskin for his mother to burn. The now human snake son simply goes to he woods to fetch a dry hazel branch, buys ten golden wedding rings and goes back home, then places the rings on his wife's fingers, some hoops around her belly and a pair of shoes on her feet. He then curses her not to give birth to their child until he touches her again, the metal apparel falls from her body, but she will only be able to look for him until she eats bread made from a single wheat grain and eats a fruit from the dried hazel branch, and vanishes. The plants the grain of wheat, harvests it the next year and prepares the bread, all the while crying over the dried branch for it to yield fruit. He starts a long journey, until she reaches the house of an old woman, who takes her in. The pregnant girl works for the old woman and gains a golden spindle, a golden thread and a golden lock reel. The girl also learns her husband is married to another woman and finds him there. She dons beggar clothes and draws out the golden objects, which she trades for three nights with her husband, each time for each night. However, the snake son's second wife gives him some sleeping wine to drug him, and the girl fails to wake him, whom she calls "Snakeskin King Peter" ("Kígyóhéjú Király Péter", in the original) on the first two nights. On the morning of the third day, a servant of Peter's tells him about the events of the previous nights, and he agrees to avoid drinking the wine. His servant brings some wine for him, but lets the bottle fall to the ground. Peter's true wife trades the last golden object and goes to his room, begging him to wake up and detach the apparel from her body. He wakes up and touches her, which releases her from the rings and allows her to give birth to their son. The second wife comes in the room to scold the girl, but Peter defends her, saying she is his true wife.

==== The Snake Child ====
In a tale from Sic, Romania, collected by Olga Nagy and József Faragó with the title A kígyófiú ("The Snake Child"), an old man finds a snake and adopts it as his son. One day, the snake announces it wants to marry the princess. The old woman talks to he king, who agrees to their marriage, if the snake child fulfills some tasks: first, to build a palace overnight; second, to fill the king's castle with silver. After fulfilling the tasks, the snake marries the princess, and reveals to her his true identity: the son of the Green King. She betrays his secret and he disappears, so she begins a quest for him. The princess passes by the Sun, the Moon and the King of the Birds, and gains a gift from each. The King of the Birds also asks his subjects, the birds, for the location of the Green King's son (the princess's husband), and they do not know, save for a little woodpecker, who says it has just flown from there. The King of the Bird then orders the woodpecker to fly back and carry the princess there. The woodpecker refuses, since it was almost shot in his lands, so the King of the Birds turns the bird into a horse, and gives the princess a final piece of advice before she departs: once she arrives at her destination, she is to take out the gifts she received, and let fate do the rest. The princess follows his words, and reaches the location of the Green King, then sits on a hill by the palace.

==== Snake Prince (Székely) ====
In a tale titled Kégyókirályfi ("Snake Prince"), collected from a Székely informant named Fábián Ágostonné, a royal couple worries for not having a son. One day, the queen sees a small snake creeping near her in the garden and makes a wish to have a child, even if he is a snakeling. As if to answer the queen's prayers, the little snake coils around the queen's leg until it reaches her arm. The queen then rushes to the king and declares the little snake she found to be their son. They place him in a secret room, afraid of people finding out they adopted a snake as a prince, and he grows larger with time. One day, he begins to whistle, and the queen goes to check on the reason: he says he wants to get married. The queen asks whom he has in mind, and the snake prince says there is a beautiful princess in the neighbouring kingdom. The king sends a representative to court the neighbouring princess, who agrees to a marriage. The princess goes to the other kingdom to be introduced to her fiancée, and the royal couple lock her up in the room with the large snake. The princess screams at the sight and cries for help, but the snake does not harm her and gazes at her. After three days, the princess, exhausted, goes to sleep on the bed, when she sees a blinding light nearby: a handsome youth. The youth explains he is the snake, and the princess questions why he does not discard the snakeskin, but he answers he has to still wear it for some time. They spend the days like this: the prince remains a snake by day and removes the snake disguise at night, until one winter's day, when the queen, noticing the silence in the princess's face, talks to her. The princess tells her mother-in-law about the prince's snakeskin and asks how they can destroy it. The queen suggests the takes the snakeskin and bring it to her, so she could throw it in the oven. Their plan is carried out on that same night. Meanwhile, the snake prince, in human form, wakes up and, not finding his disguise, asks his wife where it is. The princess feigns ignorance, but the prince can sense the burning smell. He then laments that she could not wait for three weeks and three days, when his curse would have ended, but now he has to go to the land of the snakes ("kégyóországba"), to marry the daughter of their king, who cursed him in the first place for not marrying his daughter. However, the princess can find him again, after she sows wheat, harvest it and make bread with it. With this, he vanishes. The queen enters the room and finds her daughter-in-law in tears, who reveals the prince went missing and she will search for him. The princess plants the wheat and makes bread with, then begins her quest through plains and valleys, until she reaches a dense forest, where the Moon lives with his old mother, and is given a golden distaff. Next, she travels to the house of the Sun and its old mother and gains a golden spindle. Lastly, she arrives at the house of the Wind and its mother, and the Wind agrees to carry her to her husband's location the next morning. Before she leaves, the Wind's mother gives her a "motollát" and the princess departs on the back of the Wind to the snake prince's location. They reach a palace, and the girl takes out the golden objects. From up the castle, a witch princess spots the shiny golden object and says she must have them. The first princess, the snake-prince's true wife, offers the golden objects for three nights with the now human snake prince, and the witch accepts, but douses his drink with a sleeping powder so that he falls asleep, since she wants to marry him. The princess cannot wake him up on the first two nights, due to the sleeping potion, and says she will only return for one more night, and no more. The next morning, a person invited to the prince's wedding tells him about a person that comes at night to the prince's bed and crying to him, but he does not seem to react. On the third and last night, the princess manages to wake the snake prince, who is glad to see her again, and they hatch a plan to escape the witches' castle: they will sit on a broom and utter a magical command to fly back to the snake prince's father's palace. It happens thus, and the couple return safely to their kingdom. Since it has been so long since his departure, the snake prince and his wife are welcomed with a grand party. Hungarian folklorist Ágnes Kovács suggested that the tale derived from the Székely tradition in Bukovina.

==== The Snake-Groom (Zenta) ====
In a Yugoslavian-Hungarian variant titled A kígyó-vőlegény ("The Snake-Groom"), a poor couple wishes for a son and a snake is born. Time passes, and the snake whistles for his mother. The woman talks to her son and he says he wishes to be married. He sets his eyes on some neighbouring girls. They invite the first girl: she enters the bedroom, sees the snake and screams; the snake coils around her neck and strangles her. The same thing happens to a second girl. When it is time for a third candidate, the girl caresses the snake and survives the ordeal. She discovers the snake is a handsome man at night and wears the snakeskin during the day. Her mother-in-law convinces the girl to burn the skin. She prepares the oven with some hot coals and throws the skin in the fire. The snake son wakes up and admonishes his wife, and curses her to not give birth and for her ring to stick to her finger until she has found him in a black castle in the north. He vanishes and she goes after him, passing by the house of three old women and gaining golden objects: the Sun and his mother (who gives her a golden spinning wheel), the Moon and his mother (who gives her a golden "viszálló" or spindle), and the Whirlwind ("forgószél", in the original) and his mother (who gives her a golden bobbin). Still in the third house, the old woman asks her son to help the girl reach the black castle up north in no time. At last she arrives at the castle of the fairy queen, where she sees launderesses trying to wash a bloodied shirt. The pregnant girl manages to do it when the other women failed, and a maidservant reports to the fairy queen about her presence. She is brought to the monarch's court room and trades the golden objects for three nights with her husband. She sits by his bedside and begs him to wake up and touch her. He does on her third attempt and at last she gives birth to their child. The next day, the fairy princess and her court disappear from the castle. The tale was originally published by István Bano in magazine Kalangya with the title A kígyó-vőlegény ("The Snake Groom"), and sourced from Zenta.

==== Snake-Blowing Prince (Szaján) ====
In a Yugoslavian-Hungarian tale collected in Száján with the title Kígyófújta Szép Királyfi ("Snake-Blowing Beautiful Prince") or Kígyófújta Királyfi ("Snake-Blowing Prince"), a man takes some food with him and leaves the bag open in the forest, when a little snake enters the bag. The man returns home and his wife finds the little snake in the bag, and her husband wishes aloud that they could have a little snake as a son. Thus, his wife gives birth to a little snake, which they place in a hole. The snake grows largers as the months pass, and, one day, begins to whistle to his parents. His father deduces he wants to get married, but his mother questions who would want to marry a snake. Still, they find a man with two daughters that may provide their son's potential bride. The woman goes to talk to the man and asks for the eldest daughter as a bride for the snake son, whom the story calls Kígyófújta Szép János ("Snake-Blowing Beautiful Janos"). The man sends his elder daughter as the couple's son's bride, unaware he is a snake. When the girl meets the snake, she shoos him away in disgust. For this, the snake son coils and strangles her. The couple bury the first girl and send for her younger sister. The snake bids the girl to kiss him as her bridegroom, and the second girl embraces him. She survives, and he takes off his snakeskin at night, showing himself to be a handsome youth, then folds the animal disguise and places it under a pillow. His mother asks the girl about the snake son, and she tells her about his secret transformation and the snakeskin. János's mother creeps in the room, steals the snakeskin from under the pillow and burns it in an oven. The next morning, János wakes up and aks his wife about the snakeskin, but the girl feigns ignorance about it. He tells her he needed the serpentine disguise, for he could not stand to be in the country, then puts on a white shirt and begins to depart. His wife goes after him, cuts her finger and lets three drops of blood fall on his shirt, cursing it that no one but her can remove the stains, and János, in turn, curses her not to give birth until he places his hand on her again. With this, he departs. Left behind, the girl cries for her fate and for her loss, then decides to go after him. After a long journey, she reaches the house of an iron-nosed old woman, who takes her in. The old woman's son, the Whirlwind, comes in next and is asked if he saw János anywhere. The Whirlwind says he saw János on an island, where he rules with another wife. His mother orders her son to take the human girl there, and gives her a golden jug, which she is to place on a spread carpet and sell it for a night with her husband János. The Whirlwind takes the girl to the island, where she finds some launderesses trying to wash a bloodstain from a white shirt. The girl asks to try her hand at washing the piece of clothing, and removes the stain, to the other laundresses' surprise. The girl then takes out the golden jar to draw the attention of János's second wife. The ploy works, and the girl trades the golden jug for a night in János's room. His second wife gives him a soporific drink, but he avoids drinking it, then pretends to be asleep. The girl enters his room and begs Janos, whom she calls "Kényófújta Szép János", to touch her belly. After three times, the man wakes up and touches her, allowing their child to be born, a seven-year-old golden-haired boy. After reuniting with his first wife, János falls into a dilemma: he has now two wives, so he summons nobles, barons, prince and some gypsies to give him an answer. The noblemen say János should remain with the second wife, but the gypsies suggest he stays with the first one, making an analogy between having and losing a utensil, buying a second one, then finding the first one. Thus, János remains with his first wife.

==== Snakegroom (Vojvodina) ====
In a Yugoslavian-Hungarian tale collected by Olga Penavin with the title Kígyóvőlegény ("Snakegroom"), from a source in Vojvodina, an old couple live together, but have no children. The woman says they could have a reptile for a son, and she leaves to release herself, when a little snake begins to talk to her and asks to be her son. The woman calls her husband and they adopt the snake. Twenty years later, the snake crawls on the wall and begins to whistle, and the old woman correctly interprets the snake son's whistling as him wanting to marry. The old man thinks of a poor man and his three daughter, and they bring the elder daughter. The snake son tries to crawl next to her, but she rebuffs him. For this, the snake kills her. The same happens to the middle daughter. Lastly, they bring in the poor man's youngest girl, and she welcomes the snake to lie next to her. For this, the snake removes his snakeskin and becomes a handsome youth. The snake's parents go to check if their prospective daughter-in-law is dead and find her safe and sound. The girl also tells the couple their son is a handsome human underneath the snakeskin and they plan to burn it that same night. The girl heats up some coals and tosses the snakeskin into the fire. The human snake wakes up and admonishes her for doing so, then curses her not to bear their child and not to remove the rings on her finger until he touches her again, and bids her to follow him northwards. With this, he vanishes. The girl goes after him on a long journey: after seven years, she passes by the house of an old woman and her son, the Sun, then after another seven years to the house of the Moon ("Hód", in dialectal) and his mother. Neither the Sun, nor the Moon have seen her husband. Lastly, after a third seven-year journey, she reaches the house of the Whirlwind. The Whirlwind has seen her husband and takes the girl to the front of the castle where he is residing now. After she arrives, she sees a group of washerwomen trying to remove the bloodstains of a shirt. The girl offers to wash the stains, which are her blood, and manages to remove them. The lady of the castle tries to stop the girl from seeing the snake husband, but the labour pains are increasing and she cries out for her husband. The snake husband, now human, wakes up and touches his wife allowing her to give birth to their son. The lady of the castle disappears. The tale ends.

==== Snakeblowing King's Son (Ung) ====
In a Hungarian tale collected in Ung with the title A kigyófujta kirájfi ("Snakeblowing King's Son"), an old farmer couple has no children, but the woman wants one. One day, she goes to the forest and spots a snake, then utters a wish to have a snake as a child, and one is born to her, whom they call Snakeblowing Kisjánoska. Years later, the snake son calls for his parents and ask them to find him a bride, but they question who would want to marry one such as him. Still, the snake son points to a judge and his three daughters as potential candidates, and asks for the eldest daughter. His mother goes to talk to the judge and brings the eldest daughter. The snake then asks the bride to kiss him, but she rebuffs him. He bites her to death, but mourns her for seven years. After seven years, he whistles for his parents and announces he wants to remarry, suggesting the judge's middle daughter as his new bride. His mother brings him the middle daughter, and he asks for a kiss, but she rebuffs him and he kills her for it. After another seven year period of mourning, the snake asks for the judge's youngest daughter as his bride. The girl is brought to him and he asks for a kiss, so she gives him one. By doing this, the snakeskin falls from his body and he becomes a handsome youth at night, but dons the reptilian skin in the morning. The snake thanks his bride, but tells her he must wear it for some time and she must pass a test of her own: she can walk freely through the castle, but cannot enter the forbidden twelfth room, while he goes away. This goes on for some time, and the girl's curiosity grows with time, so she decides to open the twelfth door: inside, a seven-headed dragon is imprisoned. As soon as she opens the door, a rope cuts up and Kisjánoska returns home to deal with the dragon, fighting it to the death. A bloodied Kisjánoska, victorious, admonishes his wife for violating this ban, and tells her to go away, cursing her to only give birth to their child when he touches her belly again. In return, the girl tells him that only she will be able to wash the blood of his shirt, and he leaves. After nine months, the girl is pregnant, but cannot give birth to her child, so she places three iron hoops around her belly, and begins a journey. She eventually finds some women trying to wash a bloodied shirt under a bridge, since the king informed that he would marry the one who did it. The girl asks to try her hand at it, in exchange for spending the night in the king's chambers. She manages to remove the stains, and is allowed to spend three nights at the castle. The iron-nosed old woman gives the king a drink before the girl enters his room, and the girl cries over his body, calling him Kisjánoska and begging him to wake up and touch her belly so that their son can be born, since she washed his shirt. She fails for the first night. A servant of the king informs him about the girl that cries for him, and he avoids drinking the wine the following night. The girl returns to his room and begs him to touch her. Kisjánoska wakes up and touches her, allowing her to give birth to a "beautiful child", a boy. Kisjánoska admits they both suffered, and regrets that he chased her away. So they reunite and live happily.

==== The Cursed Snake ====
In a Hungarian tale collected by Árnold Ipolyi and published by Katalin Benedek with the title Az elátkozott kígyó. hűségpélda ("The Cursed Snake: an example of loyalty"), a herceg's wife is childless until she gives birth to a snake son, who hides in the trash heap and whistles to make his wishes known. In time, the snake son whistles to his mother and announces his wishes: he wishes to get married. A poor man in the village offers his three daughters, to his great sadness, and his elder daughter is given to the snake youth. Her wedding is celebrated in a grand feast, but she takes a knife to the wedding chambers. The snake youth tries to approach her, but the girl beats his nose thrice. For this, he kills her. The poor man gives him his middle daughter, who also suffers the same fate. Lastly, the poor man gives his cadette, and worries for her death, otherwise he will hang himself. The third girl gives some cake to the snake and caresses his head. For this, the snake removes his snakeskin to become a handsome prince at night, but wears it again in the morning. The following morning, the snake's family is surprised to see their daughter-in-law alive, and she tells her mother-in-law about the snake youth's true form. The mother-in-law suggests she takes the snakeskin and burns it in an oven. The girl does as she was instructed, but the prince wakes up, ties a golden belt around his wife's belly and curses her not to give birth to their child until she finds him again, then departs. The girl goes after him and passes by the Sun, who directs him to the Moon. Both do not know the location of her husband, so she goes to the house of the Winds, but only its mistress is there. The Wind returns, but cannot stand the girl's human stench, so the mistress of the Winds sends the girl away and gives her a golden spinning wheel, a golden distaff and a golden duck, which she is to trade for the right to be with her husband. After another long journey, the girl reaches the castle of a princess who wishes to marry the now human snake youth. The girl trades the golden objects with the princess for a night with the snake youth and cannot wake him up on the first two nights, since the princess gave him a drink laced with sleeping powder. On the third night, he wakes up and touches her belly, unlocking the golden belt and allowing her to give birth to their child, thus paying her penitence.

==== Other tales ====
In an untitled Yugoslavian-Hungarian tale collected by Olga Penavin from informant Turi Gábor in Zenta, a couple adopts a snake as their son and soon arrange a wedding for him with a human girl. The first girl is brought to him and rebuffs her snake husband, so he kills her. The snake's father brings in the second girl, who suffers the same fate. Worried about their son killing the girls, the man brings the youngest sister to the snake. The third girl caresses him instead of refusing him. For this, the snake becomes a handsome youth. In the morning, the girl tells her parents-in-law about their snake son's transformation and how he donned the snakeskin again. The snake's mother advises her daughter-in-law to prepare some coals and burn the snake disguise. It happens thus. The snake son, in human form, wakes up, admonishes his wife for doing this and tells her he will depart to a black palace northwards and curses her not to give birth to their son until he touches her breast. With this, he vanishes. His wife goes after him on a long journey, passing by the house of an old woman and her son, the Sun, where she gains a golden spinning wheel, then by the house of the Sun's brother, the Moon, and his mother, where she gains a golden spindle. Neither the Sun, nor the Moon know of her husband's location. At last, she reaches the house of the Wind and his mother. The Wind knows where her husband is: by the shore of a great lake. The Wind's mother gives the girl a golden yarn and she departs with the Wind. The girl arrives at the black palace, where she passes "three tests". Finally, her husband touches her body and she gives birth to their child, living happily until their deaths.

=== Tales about dog husband ===
==== The Lazy Girl ====
In a tale collected from teller János Puji, in Marosszentkirály (Sâncraiu de Mureș) by ethnographer Olga Nagy (hu), titled A rest léany ("The Lazy Girl"), an old woman has a daughter that is so very lazy. One day, fed up with the girl's behaviour, curses that a dog shall take the girl for wife. The same night, a dog knocks on the woman's door and comes to collect the girl as his wife. The woman gives her daughter to the dog and they leave for the dog's castle. When night comes, the dog takes off the dogskin and becomes human, and wears the dogskin by day. Time passes, the girl asks the dog to visit her mother. The dog agrees, but warns him to say nothing to her mother. The girl is taken to her mother's house and tells that her husband becomes a man at night by taking off the dogskin. The woman, then, advises the girl to place some hot coals by the bed, so that her husband kicks off the dogskin and it falls on the coals. The girl goes home and follows her instructions; the dogskin begins to burn and the husband wakes up. He complains that he only had to wear the skin for another 9 days, and curses his wife not to give birth until he embraces her again. The girl returns to her mother's house and explains the situation. She commissions a pair of iron rings from a blacksmith and begins her quest. She reaches the house of the Holy Friday and takes shelter with her. Holy Friday is sorry she cannot help the girl, but gives her a golden spindle and directs her to the house of Holy Saturday. The girl next passes by the house of Holy Saturday, who also cannot help her but give her a golden bundle and directs her to the house of Holy Sunday. At last, Holy Sunday can provide further help: she gives the girl a chicken with 12 golden chicks, and tells her to go to the castle just before the end of the world; use the golden gifts to draw the attention of the empress. Following her advice, the girl takes out each of the golden gifts; the empress sends her maidservant to ask the strange girl the price for the gifts: one night with the emperor in his chambers. The girl spends two nights, but is not able to wake him, only on the third night. The girl's husband wakes and places her hand on his wife; she gives birth to twins, a golden-haired boy and a golden-haired girl, each with a golden apple on hand.

==== The Greyhound Prince and his Wife ====
Antal Hoger collected the tale Az agárbőrös királyfi és felesége ("The Greyhound Prince and his Wife"), a woman has no sons and prays to God to have one, even if it is a hound. So, she gives birth to a puppy, which grows into a hound and demands from his mother a bride. The woman questions his son's decision, and the animal tells her he knows of a king with three daughters. The woman takes the elder princess to him, but she utters she will treat him like a dog, and the hound kills her. The same happens to the middle princess. When it is the youngest's turn, she says she will treat him like a king's son, and the hound takes her as his wife. Some time later, the woman asks her daughter-in-law about the hound son, and the princess tells him he is beautiful underneath, and both conspire to burn the dogskin. One night, the princess takes the dogskin and burns it. The hound prince smells the burning, but the princess dismisses it as just burnt food. The next day, the human hound prince bedecks his wife with ten golden rings on her fingers, a silver girdle around her belly, and a pair of silk footwear. He then curses her not to take off the jewels and not to give birth to their children (a pair of golden-haired twins) until she finds him again and he places his hand on her. He vanishes. She goes after him with an iron cane. She goes to the Mother of the Moon, who gives her a golden distaff. Next, she goes to the Mother of the Sun, who gives her a golden spindle. Lastly, she pays a visit to the Mother of the Wind, who gives her a golden matollát and directs her to a nearby village, where her husband is. The Wind also advises her to go to the village gates and draw out the golden objects to attract the attention of her husband's second spouse. The princess follows the Wind's advice and uses the golden gifts to bribe the second spouse for three nights with her husband. She fails twice, because the human greyhound is fast asleep, due to a sleeping draught given to him. On the third time, the prince pretends to be asleep so he can listen to the woman crying in his room, and wakes up. He touches his wife and she gives birth to their golden-haired twins.

== See also ==
Tales about serpent husbands:

- The Enchanted Snake
- The Green Serpent
- Tulisa, the Wood-Cutter's Daughter
- Khastakhumar and Bibinagar
- Habrmani
- King Lindworm
- Eglė the Queen of Serpents
- Princess Himal and Nagaray
- The Snake Prince
- Monyohe (Sotho)
- Umamba (Zulu folktale)
- Baemsillang (The Serpent Husband)
- Amewakahiko soshi
- Yasmin and the Serpent Prince
- Champavati
- The King of the Snakes
- Enchanted Balaur
