= Paemshillang =

Korean folktale about a serpent husband

Paemshillang: Kurŏngdŏngdŏngshinsŏnbi (Korean: 뱀신랑: 구렁덩덩신선비; RR: Baemsillang: Gureongdeongdeong sinseonbi; lit. 'The Snake Husband: The Divine Serpent Scholar') is a Korean folktale about a woman married to a snake (baem) who breaks a promise with her husband (sillang) and conquers adversity to reunite with him. This tale of a snake shedding its skin to become a man is also known as Gureongdeongdeong sinseonbi in Korea, which means "divine serpent scholar." The hardships the wife endures while searching for her husband is regarded by some as analogous to a priest attempting to once more receive a deity.

== History ==
Paemshillang adopted a narrative pattern similar to the Cupid and Psyche myth. According to the Aarne-Thompson classification of folktales, the story can be considered a Korean version of Type 425, "The Search for the Lost Husband". Paemshillang was passed down orally in more than forty-five variations throughout Korea. (Note: Another assessment gives 90 variants collected in Korea.) Some were included in major Korean folktale collections such as Hanguk gubi munhak daegye, or the Compendium of Korean Oral Literature.

== Synopsis ==
=== Summary ===
Once upon a time, there lived an old couple. One day, the old wife finally became pregnant, giving birth to a snake. The old wife kept the snake in the backyard. One of the neighbors happened to have three daughters who decided to pay a visit upon hearing rumors that the old woman next door had given birth. However, after discovering that a snake had been born, they were all disgusted except for the youngest daughter. Upon witnessing the snake, the third daughter said the old woman had given birth to a divine serpent scholar ("Kurungdungdung Shinsunbi", in the original). When the snake grew up, it begged its mother to propose his marriage to one of their neighbor's daughters. The mother went next door to propose, but the eldest and second daughters refused. The third daughter accepted the proposal and married the snake.

On their wedding night, the snake asked his bride to prepare a crock of soy sauce, a crock of flour, and a crock of water. The snake then slid into the crock of soy sauce, rolled about in the crock of flour, and finally bathed in the crock of water. When it came out, the snake had shed its skin and turned into a handsome scholar. The bride's elder sisters grew jealous when they saw their younger sister living with such an exceptionally handsome gentleman.

One day, the snake husband made his wife promise not to show anyone his skin and went off to take the government service examination in Seoul. Unfortunately, the wife's elder sisters came over to secretly search for the snakeskin and burned it. Sensing from Seoul that his skin had been burned, the serpent scholar disappeared. When her husband failed to return home, the wife set out to look for him. On her way, she met a crow, a wild boar, a woman doing laundry and a farmer plowing the field and did what each of them asked her to do in order to learn of her husband's whereabouts.

By the time the wife caught up with him, the serpent scholar had already remarried and was living with another woman. He decided to give tasks to the two women and stay with the one who performed them better. The tasks involved challenges like chopping firewood, drawing water, and sneaking a hair from a tiger's eyebrow, which the first wife carried out successfully while the second wife did not. The serpent scholar thus left his second wife and went back to living happily ever after with his first wife.

=== Variation ===
Alternate versions of this folktale gave a different account of the snake's birth, his marriage to the third daughter, and his reunion with her. The mother of the snake is either an old woman or a widow. The pregnancy comes either from picking up and eating the egg of an animal or from a monk poking her with a stick. One version illustrates how the daughter's father at first rejects the snake's proposal but later reluctantly accepts, because the snake threatened to ruin the whole family. Another version offers detailed descriptions about the snake shedding its skin or the snake husband's reunion with his first wife, only briefly covered in other versions. Details pertaining to the third daughter's journey in search of her lost husband also vary.

== Features and significance ==
The snake in Paemshillang is a mystical creature. In some versions of the tale, the snake threatens its mother that it will hold a fire in one hand, a knife in the other, and slide back into her womb if she does not propose his marriage to their neighbor's third daughter. This is another scene that makes sense only by assuming the snake is a deity. And since it is a deity, the mother is compelled to accede to her son's request.

The third daughter's recognition of the snake as a divine serpent scholar demonstrates her wisdom. Her first meeting with the snake could be seen as a deity's answer to her prayers. The third daughter's quest to find her husband after the burning of the snakeskin causes him to disappear signifies a process of attempting to welcome back a lost deity.

From the third daughter's point of view, her ordeals reflect female characters in Korean narrative literature. Her competition with the serpent scholar's new wife demonstrates the conflict between the wife and concubines due to polygamy. The third daughter's victory against the new wife represents the common female tendency to root for the wife to defeat concubines.

== Similar folktales ==
Paemshillang is a folktale like Sangsabaem (Hangul: 상사뱀; English: The Lovesick Snake) and Yaraeja (Hangul: 야래자; English: The Nocturnal Visitor) in which an animal shapeshifts into human form.

=== Comparison to other East Asian folktales ===
Korean scholarship sees a possible relationship between Korean tale Paemshillang and Japanese story Amewakahiko, since both pertain to stories about snake bridegrooms who marry human women, disappear and are sought after by their spouses. However, it is also claimed that the Korean tale passed down orally, while the Japanese story was a literary development of the Japanese medieval period. Another point of comparison lies in the wife's journey: in some versions of the Korean tale, she is guided by the helpers to the husband's realm, an underwater world, while in the Japanese tale she ascends to the heavenly abode.

== Legacy ==
The tale provided the Korean playwright Oh Young-jin with a motif for his play Maengjinsadaek gyeongsa (맹진사댁 경사 The Maengjinsa Family's Wedding Day), which criticizes the way humans obsess over external aspects such as looks, power, or familial ties instead of internal aspects.

== See also ==
Tales about serpent bridegrooms

- The Enchanted Snake
- The Serpent Prince
- The Green Serpent
- Tulisa, the Wood-Cutter's Daughter
- Khastakhumar and Bibinagar
- Habrmani
- Yasmin and the Serpent Prince
- Princess Himal and Nagaray
- The Snake Prince
- Champavati
- The Ruby Prince (Punjabi folktale)
- Monyohe (Sotho)
- Umamba (Zulu folktale)
- Amewakahiko soshi
- The King of the Snakes
