= Yasmin and the Serpent Prince =

Iranian folktale about a snake bridegroom

Folk tale
- Name: Yasmin and the Serpent Prince
- Aarne–Thompson grouping: ATU 425B, "Son of the Witch"
- Region: Iran
- Published in: Folk tales of ancient Persia by Forough Hekmat (1974)
- Related: Cupid and Psyche; Grünkappe; The Snake-Prince Sleepy-Head; Sabzqaba

Yasmin and the Serpent Prince (Persian: یاسمین و شاهزاده مار) is an Iranian folktale published in 1974 by author Forough Hekmat, about a human maiden who marries a youth in snakeskin, loses him due to her breaking his trust, and goes after him at his mother's home, where she is forced to perform hard tasks for her.

The tale belongs to the international cycle of the Animal as Bridegroom or The Search for the Lost Husband, wherein a human princess marries a supernatural husband or man in animal form, loses him, and goes on a quest to find him. It is also distantly related to the Graeco-Roman myth of Cupid and Psyche, in that the heroine is forced to perform difficult tasks for a witch or her mother-in-law. According to scholarship, many variants of the cycle are reported to exist in Iran, and the usual form of the animal husband is that of a snake or serpent.

== Summary ==
Long time ago, in a Persian city, a merchant named Hajji Muhammad lives with his five daughters, the youngest, named Yasmin, the one he loves best of all. One day, he has to go on a journey, and asks his daughters what they want as gifts. The four elders want extravagant garments and shoes, but the youngest asks for a clustered bunch of grape-like pearls and a starred, two-pointed diamond.

Hajji Muhammad goes on his journey and, after doing his business, buys the presents for his four elder daughters, but has trouble finding Yasmin's request. His quest is interrupted by a violent storm, so he takes shelter in a castle in the middle of a plain. He enters the castle and notices that the garden is full of silver and gold trees.

This mysterious garden seems like a vision of paradise: flowers made of precious gems, stream of milk and honey flowing from the trees, and many melodies coming from the trees. He ventures deep into the garden and finds the branch of pearls and diamonds. He goes to pluck it, but a roar behind him interrupts his action. The merchant turns around and sees a large snake, of a bright green colour.

The merchant explains to the green snake that the branch is supposed to be a present for his youngest daughter, Yasmin. Noticing that the merchant seems too interested in the branch from his garden, the green snake makes a deal with him: he shall get the branch, but, in return, his youngest daughter is to be given to the serpent as his wife. The merchant is a bit alarmed by the proposal about his daughter, about any potential danger. The snake assuages his fears and they seal a written pact.

The merchant returns home with the branch, jewels and presents for his daughters. Time passes, and he forgets about his promise to the snake, until one day, a knock is heard at the door. It is the snake, come to take his wife, as promised. The merchant goes inside to tell Yasmin about his promise. Yasmin agrees that promises must be kept, but, hoping to delay - and even discourage - the snake about the marriage proposal, she says the snake must prepare a feast for 40 days, where the finest dishes and drinks are to be served, and every guest must be showered with gems.

The animal agrees with the conditions and takes a three day leave for wedding preparations. The snake returns after three days on a golden coach and takes them to the wedding feast, in the same garden where Hajji Muhammad found the pearl-and-diamond branch. Yasmin, the bride, stays silent all the time.

After the feast ends and the guests rest, the snake and Yasmin retire to a spacious apartment. Yasmin, then, breaks her silence and asks the snake about his true identity, since it cannot be a mere animal, due to his magical powers. The serpent makes her promise not to tell his secret, and, casting a spell on himself, sheds its snakeskin. He reveals that he is Prince Baharam, son of the Shah of Demons, who has come from the World of Darkness to the world of man, interested in the good qualities of human people (justice, learning, love for one another), in contrast to the wickedness and base interests of the demons.

They live as husband and wife for two years, him a snake by day and a prince by night. However, she begins to miss home, and longs to show that her husband is truly human. One day, she asks Baharam about how to destroy his snakeskin. She insists to know and he tells that the skin needs to be burned with shells of pistachio nut. She delights at the answer, but feels torn between keeping his secret and destroying the snakeskin.

Some time later, she decides to visit her family, and her husband warns her not to reveal his secret. Her sisters inquire her about her life in the snake's castle, and a gossiping aunt begins to pry more and more into her life, so much so that she reveals the snake is human underneath. Her aunt suggests she burns the snakeskin, so that he remains human at all times, and gives her some pistachio nuts.

Yasmin goes home to her husband. While Baharam is asleep, she leaves the bed, gets the snakeskin from a chest, takes it to the kitchen and burns it with the shells of pistachio nuts. The next morning, Baharam awakens and asks his wife about the snakeskin. Yasmin answers that she burned it. He despairs at the fact and tells that he needed his scaly disguise, but now he has to return to the Realm of Darkness, back to his people. Yasmin throws herself at his feet and begs for forgiveness. He chastises her, and says that, to find him again, she has to walk towards the West, for 7 years, in 7 iron suits, 7 iron shoes, and with 7 iron canes. Baharam goes to the garden, chants a spell and vanishes, and the castle and everything in it disappears along with him, leaving Yasmin lost in a desert.

Despite the hunger and thirst, Yasmin traverses the desert back to her father's house. He welcomes her and lets her grieve for her lost husband. After six months, she decides to begin her arduous quest toward the Realm of Darkness. Her father commissions the iron garments and the iron canes, and she sets out. For seven years, she walks and walks, wanders high and low, until the seventh iron dress and the seventh iron shoes are worn, and the seventh iron cane is nothing but a stump in her hands. Tired of the long journey, and not knowing if she has arrived, she lies down to sleep.

After a whole day and night, she wakes up and notices she is in a meadow, full of animals of a black colour. Even the trees and flowers are black, and light does not seem to reach that land. She asks a passing man with black horns on his head whose meadow it is. The horned man says it belongs to Prince Baharam, the son of the Shah of Demons. She goes to drink a bit of the black water, and sees a slave-girl coming to get water.

The slave-girl says she is fetching water for her master, the prince. Yasmin sees a nearby castle made of black stone, and has an idea: she asks for the slave-girl to drink a bit of the water, and drops her wedding ring in it. Inside the castle, the slave-girl drops the water on Prince Baharam's hands and the ring falls out of the jug. He recognizes it and asks the slave-girl if anyone was outside. She says a woman is resting by a tree when she left to fetch water. Baharam goes outside and finds his wife Yasmin. They embrace, after seven long years, and rejoice in each other's presence. Baharam warns her of the danger the demons pose, and suggests he changes her appearance to keep her safe, until they find a chance to escape.

Baharam turns her into a golden needle and brings her home with him to the castle. Despite the magic disguise, the prince's stepmother smells a "Child of Adam" (a human) in their castle. Afraid of being found out, Baharam changes the needle into a broom, then into a piece of wood, and lastly into a spray of flowers to throw her off the human's scent, but to no avail. He then decides to introduce Yasmin to his stepmother, the Queen of Demons, as a weary traveller from the world of man. The queen of demons begrudgingly accepts her as a guest.

The next day, the Queen of Demons gives two pieces of cloth to Yasmin, and orders her to wash the white one black and the black one into white. Baharam chants a spell to change the colours. The next task is for her to fill seven clays jars with a sieve - her husband casts a spell on the sieve to fill the holes. The third task is for her to separate a heap of mixed seeds (wheat, rice, lentils, millet, poppy and vetch) - Baharam summons a swarm of ants to separate the grains.

The last task is for Yasmin to go to the stepmother's sister and get from her the "Give-and-Take-Box". Baharam advises her to compliment a thorny branch by saying it is a rosebush; to compliment a dirty river by saying it is rosewater; to give the animals their correct fodder (straw for the donkeys, bones to the dogs), open all closed doors and shut all open ones in his step-aunt's house, get the box and do not open it, and escape. Yasmin follows the instructions to the letter, gets a little black box from the step-aunt, and hurries back to the castle of the Queen of Demons. The step-aunt commands the doors, the dogs, the donkeys, the river and the thorns to stop her, but, due to her kind actions, she leaves unscathed.

Now at a safe distance, she tries to peer into the box. The lid opens up and a swarm of flies escape from it. Baharam appears to her, casts a spell and the flies go back to the box. On their journey back to the castle, Baharam tells her that his stepmother planned his wedding to his cousin, and the castle will be swarmed with demons that will kill Yasmin, so they must hurry and escape that night. He then asks her to get them a bag of needles, a box of salt and a jar of water.

That night, the demons are coming to the castle to Baharam's wedding. At midnight, Baharam excuses himself and goes to see Yasmin. They sneak out to the stables and ride his horse away from the castle. The next morning, the Queen of Demons discovers the pair's flight and commands an army of giants to go after them.

Baharam and Yasmin are riding on the prince's black horse and hear the approach of the giants. Yasmin throws the bag of needles behind them, which turn into a forest of thorns to deter the giants. Next, they throw the box of salt, turning the desert into a sea of salt. Lastly, they pour out the contents of the water jug, and a vast sea appears between them and the coming giants. The pursuers try to cross the sea to get them, but sink and drown in it.

Now safe at last, the prince and Yasmin ride to the city where her father trades as a merchant, and spend the rest of their lives in happiness. Yasmin and Baharam have three children: Mehr ('Love'), Raasti ('Truth'), and Aashti ('Peace').

== Analysis ==
=== Tale type ===
The compilers compared the Iranian tale to Armenian tale Habrmani and to the Graeco-Roman myth of Cupid and Psyche, stories that belong to the international cycle of the "Animal Bridegroom". According to Inge Höpfner, Iran registers many ("vielen") variants of the cycle.

In his Catalogue of Persian Folktales, German scholar Ulrich Marzolph classified the tale as his type AaTh 425B, Der Tierbräutigam: Die böse Zauberin ("The Animal Bridegroom: The Evil Sorceress"). Marzolph's typing corresponds to type ATU 425B, "The Son of the Witch", of the international Aarne-Thompson-Uther Index. Type 425B is considered by scholarship to correspond to the ancient Graeco-Roman myth of Cupid and Psyche, that is, the supernatural husband's mother forces the heroine, her daughter-in-law, to perform difficult and impossible tasks for her.

=== Motifs ===
According to Swahn's study on Animal as Bridegroom tales, a characteristic motif that occurs in the "Indo-Persian" area is the heroine using a ring to signal her arrival to her husband, when she finds his location.

==== The heroine's tasks ====
One of the heroine's tasks is to sort out a heap of mixed grains. According to Swedish scholar Jan-Öjvind Swahn, this motif appears in Mediterranean and Near Eastern variants of type ATU 425B, "The Witch's Tasks".

Another motif that appears in the tale type is that the heroine must travel to another witch's house and fetch from there a box or casket she must not open. German folklorist Hans-Jörg Uther remarked that these motives ("the quest for the casket" and the visit to the second witch) are "the essential feature" of the subtype.

==== The heroes' magic flight ====
The heroine and her supernatural husband escape in a Magic Flight sequence, that is, the characters either throw magic objects to delay their pursuers, or change into other forms to deceive them. Although this episode is more characteristic of tale type ATU 313, "The Magic Flight", some variants of type ATU 425B also show it as a closing episode. German literary critic Walter Puchner argues that the motif attached itself to type 425B, as a Wandermotiv ("Wandering motif").

According to Marzolph's index, Iranian type 425B concludes with the episode the "Magic Flight": by throwing objects behind them, the heroes create magic obstacles, e.g., a pack of needles becomes a field of needles, salt creates a plain of salt, and the water creates a sea or a river.

== Variants ==
=== Iran ===
==== Sabzkaba and Shakarkhava ====
In an Iranian tale published by professor Mahomed-Nuri Osmanovich Osmanov with the title "Сабзкаба и Шакархава" ("Sabzkaba and Shakarkhava"), a poor woodcutter finds a snake near a sack of flour. He wants to kill it, but the snake introduces himself as Sabzkaba ("Green Kaftan"), and wishes to become his son. One day, Sabzkaba asks his father to ask for the hand of the governor's daughter, Shakarkhava. Her father demands his prospective son-in-law arrive with a great wedding retinue. He does and the governor consents to their marriage. Sabzkaba takes off his snake skin and shows himself to his wife as human, warning her that no one must burn his skin, otherwise she might not see him again. One day, Shakarkhava is visited by her relatives, and one of her sisters burns the snakeskin. Shakarkhava, in despair, sees her husband disappear, so she commissions seven pairs of iron shoes, seven iron dresses and seven iron canes, and goes on a quest for him. She passes by seven springs, where she meets many girls complaining that their father Sabzkaba has disappeared because of Shakarkhava's fault and wishing harm on her. On the seventh spring, she asks for a bit of water to drink and tosses her ring inside the jug. Her husband Sabzkaba recognizes the ring and brings his wife to his house, where he warns her his family is made of divs. He convinces her to suckle on his div mother's breast to warm up to her. The div mother forces her to cry on the floor and sweep it; to wash a black cloth white; and to take a sieve to the div's sister. One day, the div family organizes a wedding and forces both Sabzkaba and Shakarkhava to hold one candle on each of their fingers during the ceremony. Later that night, they kill the wedding couple and escape in a Magic Flight sequence, as they are pursued by Sabzkaba's relatives, his uncle, his father and lastly his mother: they first turn into a broom (him) and a bundle of sticks (her), then into a garden (her) and a garden-keeper (him); thirdly, a mill (her) and a miller (him) and finally into a cypress tree (her) and a dragon coiled around it (him). Sabzkaba's mother reaches them and threatens his wife with a sword, but he kills her before she does any harm to the human girl. Marzolph sourced this tale from Khorasan, and, according to Osmanov, the tale was collected in Morad (modern day South Khorasan).

==== The Akhund ====
In a variant from Luristan with the title The Akhund (Luri language: Axun), collected from teller Khudâbas of Bahârvand, an akhund finds a cucumber floating in the river, brings it home and eats it. The man becomes pregnant and gives birth to a turtle. After some time, the animal pleads his human father to ask for the hand of the princess in marriage. Despite some reservations, the akhund goes to the king's palace and the vizier welcomes him. The man declares his intentions, and the king, advised by his vizier, asks the turtle suitor performs some tasks first: to provide seven camels loaded with gold and jewels. He does and he marries the princess. After the wedding, the turtle husband takes off his turtle shell and becomes a handsome man, but insists to his wife that she can never tell anyone. One day, the human wife wants to visit his family, so he transforms her into a needle, pins it into his hat, becomes a dove and flies away to his relatives. In the case they are found out, the husband instructs the girl to press his mother's breast and to force her to swear on mother's milk and father's pain not to harm her. She does exactly that, but his mother forces her to do impossible tasks: she sends her to his aunt to get a mortar (since his aunt did not make the same oath she has) to crush some kashk and to wash a blackboard white. She accomplishes it with her husband's guidance and help: he warns his wife the task is a trap, and gives her a sleeping potion to throw at his relatives at his aunt's house. Lastly, the turtle prince's mother betroths her son to another bride and prepares their wedding. The youth tricks his family by killing the bride, and putting his human wife in her place with the false bride's clothes. The couple turn into a pair of doves and escape. His family discovers the body of the false bride and pursue the couple. To distract them, the princess and her husband shapeshift into a calf (her) and a shepherdess (him), and a flower and a tree. Finally, the turtle prince delivers his wife to his father-in-law and becomes a pomegranate growing on the back of his hand, as a final trick on his aunt and mother. The collector noted that The Akhund was essentially "the same [tale] as" the Iranian tale Le Sultan Serpent, also of type ATU 425 and collected from Khorassan by Adrienne Boulvin.

==== The Serpent Sultan ====
Researcher Adrienne Boulvin published an Iranian variant from Meched (Mashhad, formerly in the Khorasan province, modern day Razavi Khorasan province). In this tale, titled Le Sultan Serpent (Persian: Shâhzâdeh-mâr, English: "The Serpent Sultan"), a poor thorn-gatherer lives with his three daughters in a village in Iran. He earns his living by gathering thorns and selling them in the village. One day, the man goes to the desert to gather thorns, when a large serpent appears to him. The serpent introduces himself as "Serpent Sultan", who has fallen in love with the thorn-gatherer's youngest daughter and demands her as his bride, or it will kill the man. The thorn-gatherer returns home and explains the situation to his youngest daughter. She decides to go with the serpent to save her father, and accompanies the serpent to the desert. The serpent guides the girl to a hole; she enters and sees a grand mansion. They live together as husband and wife, but, in the nights, the serpent gives the girl a soporific drink to make her sleep. Some time later, the girl complains to the serpent that she misses her family. The serpent allows her to visit her family, but warns against listening to any words her sisters say. The girl is happy to visit her sisters, who also advise her to avoid drinking the potion she is offered. That night, she returns to the underground mansion and is given the drink. She pretends to drink and, pretending to be asleep, sees that her serpent husband takes off the serpent skin to become a handsome man. The next morning, the girl asks the serpent how to burn his snakeskin. He tells her the skin can be burnt with onion peels and garlic peels, but warns her that if his skin is burnt, she will have to wear seven iron shoes and walk with seven iron canes. In a certain afternoon, while her husband is away, the girl burns the snakeskin. She waits him to return, but he never does, so she goes after him with iron shoes and iron canes.

She walks for years until she comes across a stream flowing through a verdant meadow, and some chickens and roosters nearby. Feeling hungry, she asks a hen-keeper for some eggs, but he refuses her request, on the basis that none shall eat the Serpent Sultan's eggs. She sees some cows nearby and asks the cowherd for some of their milk, but the cowherd also refuses. Finally, the girl sees a maidservant coming to fetch water and asks for some to drink, but the servant refuses. The servant brings the water to her master and tells him about the thirst girl at the fountain, and Serpent Sultan orders the servant to go back and fulfill the girl's request. The servant obeys and gives the girl water to drink, and the girl secretly places her ring inside the water jug. The Serpent Sultan recognizes the ring and brings his wife in. He warns her his family is composed of divs which may devour her once they learn he married a "descendant of Adam" (a human), so he will pass her off as a servant.

Serpent Sultan's div-mother suspects something is amiss with the newest servant, and begins to hound her. First, the div-mother gives the girl a piece of black felt and orders her to wash it white. With her husband's help, the girl delivers a whitened piece to the div-mother. Next, she orders the girl to pay a visit to the div's sister and get a box from her. Serpent Sultan intercepts his wife and advises her how to traverse the way to his aunt: his wife is to close open doors and open closed doors; give the correct fodder for two animals (straw for a camel, bone for a dog); open a closed bed and close an open bed; ask his aunt for the box, then, while the aunt is away in the kitchen with a butcher's knife, the girl is to get the box and escape. The girl follows the instructions to the letter and escapes from the aunt's house with the box, despite the aunt commanding the dog, the camel, the beds and the doors to stop her.

Lastly, the div-mother marries Serpent Sultan to his cousin. As a last task, the div-mother orders the girl to wash the carpet with her tears and sweep it with her eyelashes. The Serpent Sultan also fulfills this task. Later, she orders her to serve as living chandelier for the ceremony, as the div guests eat pieces of her flesh. Serpent Sultan spreads a dough around the girl's body to protect her from the candles and the voracious div-guests. During the ceremony, the Serpent Sultan feels sorry for the girl, seeing her in that state, and decides to escape with her that same night. He kills his cousin, takes the girl, and both ride away on horses. His div-family goes after them; Serpent Sultan throws behind him some needles and prays to God for the desert to be filled with needles. Next, he throws behind a bit of salt, and prays that it covers the whole desert. At last, he throws behind a water jug and creates a lake between him and his wife and the div-family. His div-mother asks him how they can cross the lake. Serpent Sultan replies that they just have to step on the reflection of the moon and the stars on the surface of the lake. The div-family believe his words, step on the lake and sink to the bottom of the lake. Serpent Sultan and the girl return to their mansion and live happily.

==== The Daughter of the Woodcutter and her Serpent Husband ====
Russian Iranist Alexander Romaskevich collected in Shiraz, in the Sivandi language, a tale he translated as "Дочь дровосека и её жених-змей" ("The Daughter of the Woodcutter and her Serpent Husband"). In this tale, a poor and old woodcutter has three daughters. One day, he prepares to find some firewood, so he takes off his shoes to go to the oven, and when he turns around, a snake is lying on his shoes. The woodcutter asks the snake to get off his shoes, but the snake tells the man to give him one of his daughters. The woodcutter goes back home and tells his daughters about the situation. The elder two refuse to marry the snake, but the youngest offers herself. The snake gives him means to buy better clothes for his daughter; he buys a fine dress, then gives her away to the snake. The snake and the girl go down a tree hole and enter a beautiful patio, then the snake takes off the snakeskin and becomes a handsome youth named Шафѝ Гýли Зард ("Shafi Guli Zard"). Some time later, the nameless heroine wants to visit her family. She goes back home and shows her sisters the belt from her husband's snakeskin kaftan. Her sisters suggest to burn it. The girl returns to her husband and, while he is in the bath, she tries to burn the snakeskin. Her husband smells the burning and stops her actions, warning her that, to find him again, she is to walk in seven pairs of iron shoes.

Some days later, the girl repeats her action: she throws the snakeskin in the fireplace and burns it. Shafi Guli Zard comes out of the bath and tells his wife that they will be separated now. Suddenly, an eagle flies into the patio, and says that Shafi Guli Zard's aunt awaits for him. The youth jumps onto the eagle's wings and flies bacl to his aunt. When he arrives, his aunt tells him she expects him to marry a person named "Фатма Ханум" (Fatma-Khanum). Shafi Guli Zard chooses to follow his aunt's orders, since she is a div and might eat him.

Meanwhile, his wife, who has been following the eagle's shadow, reaches the castle of Shafi Guli Zard's aunt and cries a bit near a fountain, when she sees a servant fetching water. She asks for some and drops her ring into the jar. Her husband takes her in and passes her off as another maid. She is given the mocking name of Fatma-Pleshak, and made to be the servant of the false bride. Shafi's aunt takes the girl to a yard and orders her to water the yard with her tears. She goes to Shafi to tell him about the task. Her husband reproaches her, but prays to God and invokes Solomon's help to command a wind to sweep the floor and a cloud to rain on the yard. Next, the div-aunt gives a shater to the girl and orders her to wash it in the oven until it becomes white. Shafi repeats his magic command and fulfills the task.

Lastly, the girl is to go to the house of the div-aunt's sister and ask for the self-cutting scissors and the self-playing tambourine. Her husband instructs her to compliment the crooked and twisted scenery on the way there, and to give the animals their correct food. Finally, his aunt sets the heroine as candleholder to Shafi Guli Zard's wedding to Fatma-Khanum. She cries out that her hands are burning, and Shafi Guli Zard answers that his own body is burning. After the ceremony, his aunt conspires with her sister to devour the human girl, Fatma-Pleshak, the next morning. Shafi Guli Zard and the false bride enter the bridal chambers. At midnight, he puts some cotton on the wedding bells to muffle them, goes to Fatma-Pleshak (his true wife) and they escape in the dark of night.

The div aunt and her sister devour the wrong person, and the wedding bells alert them that the couple have escaped. They race after the couple to enact their revenge. Back to the couple, as soon as they see the divs after them, Shafi Guli Zard prays to God and calls out to Solomon for a forest of thorns to appear behind them to hurt their pursuers, then a salt swamp and for the salt to penetrate their wounds, and finally for a vast sea to appear behind them to separate the couple from their pursuers. After the sea appears, the divs on the other side ask him how he traversed it. Shafi Guli Zard tells them to place some millstones around their necks and to wade until they reach the other margin. The divs take the millstones, enter the sea and sink to the bottom. Shafi Guli Zard stays a bit longer to check if they indeed drowned; murky, dirty water begins to pool at the surface. Shafi Guli Zard and his wife celebrate that their pursuers are no more and return home.

==== Shafi Guli Zard ====
In an Iranian tale collected in Fars province with the title "شفی گلی زرد" ("Shafi Guli Zard"), a snake appears to an old man in the desert and demands one of the man's daughters in marriage. The man returns home and asks his daughters which will go to the snake: the elder five refuse, but the youngest, suspecting something more about the snake agrees. Thus, the girl is prepared and dressed in fine garments and given to the snake, while the snake repays him a hefty dowry in jewels and gold, and the man departs. The girl keeps suspecting the snake is more than it appears, they enter the snake's abode through a crevice, and she finds a lush garden inside with a large mansion in the distance. The snake comes out of the snakeskin to show his true form as a handsome human youth, and, despite some initial reluctance, reveals his origins: he is Shafi Guli Zard, son of the Shah of the Paris, who an ugly black woman wants to betroth to her even uglier daughter. He alternates between both places so they will not suspect anything, and asks his human wife to keep the secret; if not, he will depart and she has to wear out seven pairs of iron shoes in search for him. Some time later, she begins to miss her family, and pays them a visit in her parents' house, adorning herself with garments and jewels and joined by her husband, who camps outside the house in a tent. Her mother is surprised at her presence, but her elder sisters mock her for being a snake's wife that has come to poison them. Fed up with their mockery, she shows then jewels and ornaments her husband gave her, questions how her spouse can be a snake if he can talk, and finally reveals her husband is Shafi Guli Zard, son of the Shah of the Paris. On hearing this, Shafi Guli Zard shows himself and abandons his wife.

The girl puts on seven pairs of iron shoes and goes after him, passing by mountains and deserts. She meets a shepherd on the journey, then wanders off until she finds an old woman who takes her. However, the old woman begins to force her on hard tasks as her servant. One day, the old woman gives her a black cloth and orders her to wash it white in the water. When doing the task, Shafi Guli Zard appears and asks why she went after him. The girl says she would never break her promise, but her sisters made her do it, and Shafi Guli Zard explains the old woman is Elala Zangi, who betrothed her daughter to him. He also chants a spell and turns the black cloth white. Days later, Elala Zangi orders the girl to go to her sister's house and fetch from there a pair of self-cutting and self-sewing scissors. Shafi Guli Zard intercepts her and advises her how to proceed: she is to compliment a hedge of thorns and say it is a needle, compliment a pool of sewage and say it contains water like honey and oil, exchange the fodder between two animals (bone for a dog, straw for a camel), open a closed door and close an open one, get the scissors from the ledge and flee. Following his instructions, she reaches the old woman's sister's house, gets the scissors and rushes back. The old woman commands the door, the animals and the scenery to stop her, but they stay their hand. After this success, Elala Zangi still forces her on more hard tasks, which are done with Shafi Guli Zard's help.

Next, she is to clean up the yard for his upcoming wedding, which is done by Shafi Guli Zard summoning a raincloud after praying to God. Finally, the girl is placed on a platform and forced to hold ten candles on her fingers to illuminate Shafi Guli Zard's wedding to Elala Zangi's daughter. During the ceremony, the candles are melting in her hands, and she complains her hands are burning, while Shafi Guli Zard says it is his life that is. At midnight, Shafi Guli Zard takes the candles from his human wife's hands and escapes with her.

==== The Box of Strike and Dance ====
In an Iranian tale titled "قوطی بزن و برقص" ("The Box of Strike and Dance"), a man in the city of Saba has three daughters, each living their lives. His middle daughter is married to a person named Malik Ibrahim, who is the son of the king of demons and slept in dragon skin (" اژدها", "aždahâ", in the original) at night. One day, her sisters convince her to ask her husband how to destroy the dragonskin. The girl goes to ask her husband the question. In a fit of fury, he slaps her so hard she passes out. When she wakes up, Malik Ibrahim answers her: burn the dragonskin in onion peels and garlic peels, with a sprinkle of salt. Her sisters, who were eavesdropping on their conversation, follow the man's words and burn the dragonskin the next day. When Malik Ibrahim comes home the next day, he cannot find it, and chastises his wife, telling her she will only find him after she wears down seven iron canes, seven iron shoes, seven iron veils, and seven iron boxes, then disappears. After he vanishes, the girl cries for her loss, then buys the iron objects and begins her quest. The girl finds a demon on the way, and a mysterious voice advises her to toss an iron box to the demon and flee. This happens successively with six other demons, until her iron garments are finally worn out, and the girl reaches a village next to a river.

She sees an old woman fetching water near a garden and a mansion, and asks for some to drink. The old woman gives her the jar to drink, and she secretly drops her husband's ring inside it. The old woman brings the water to Malik Ibrahim, who recognizes the ring as the one he gave to a girl in the city of Saba, and fears for her, since she may be eaten by the demons. He exits the house and meets his wife. The girl kneels at his feet and asks for his forgiveness, since she was fooled by her sisters' envy. Malik Ibrahim turns her into a pin and hides it in his clothes, then goes back home. Despite his attempt to hide his wife, his demon family can sense a human's scent, so he turns the pin back into a human, and make his relatives promise not to harm her.

Despite making them promise, his demon family plan to kill the human girl, but know that Malik Ibrahim would come to her rescue. Since Malik Ibrahim is set to be married to his cousin, another demoness, they will celebrate the wedding for a whole week. During this time, his human wife cries copiously for her situation, until one day, his mother orders the girl to take a box called "box of strike and dance" to his aunt's and ask for a similar one from her. Malik Ibrahim advises her how to procceed: open a closed door and keep it ajar with a rock, exchange the fodder of two animals (oats and straw for a horse, bones for a dog), enter his aunt's house, get the box near a window and underneath a bowl, flee the house, and do not open the box. The girl begins to walk toward to his aunt's house and decides to take a peek inside the box: she opens the lid; small-sized dancers and musicians spring out of it and begin to dance and play music. She repeats a magic spell her husband taught her, and Malik Ibrahim appears to her. He commands the dancers and musicians back into the box, and chastises her.

After the incident, the girl walks to the aunt's house, by following her husband's orders, and reaches the door. Malik Ibrahim's aunt welcomes the girl and enter into another room to sharpen her teeth. While the aunt is distracted, the girl sights the second box, steals it and flees from the house. The aunt notices the girl escaped and commands the animals and the door to stop her, to no avail. The girl delivers the second box to her mother-in-law; the demon family is surprised she survived, and realize Malik Ibrahim was behind it. Finally, their wedding happens, and Malik Ibrahim marries his demoness cousin. On the wedding night, he kills her, takes his human wife and some jewels and changes them both into a cloud and part of the sky. The next morning, the demon family notice Malik Ibrahim and his cousin are sleeping late, and open their door: his cousin is there, dead, while he and the human girl are nowhere to be seen, so they chase after them through the air, but cannot finds them, save for a cloud and a piece of the sky. Realizing the cloud and the sky were the couple, the demon family send another duo to scout for the fleeing couple. This time, Malik Ibrahim turns himself into a fountain and his wife a drinking cup. Again, his demon relatives cannot find them. At last, Malik Ibrahim and his wife reach a city, and spend their lives there.

==== Shams-e-Qamar ====
In an Iranian tale collected from Qaen (Ghayen) with the title Shams-e-Qamar, an old man cuts firewood for a living. One day, he sees a snake on his axe who demands the man gives him one of his daughters. The old man returns home and tells the tale to his three daughters, and only the youngest, Bibi Sarvar, agrees to marry the snake. After they marry, Bibi Sarvar's sisters spy on her, curious about how she can live with a snake: they find that the snake becomes a youth. They later try to convince her to destroy her husband's snakeskin. Bibi Sarvar tries to burn the snakeskin at first, but it resists the flames. The girl asks her husband, Shams-e-Qamar, about the correct way to do it; he tells her it can be burnt with garlic and onion, but warns her against it. Following his instructions, she burns the snakeskin. Shams-e-Qamar wakes up and admonishes his wife, telling her she will find him after she wears down seven iron garments and seven pairs of iron shoes. He vanishes. She puts on the iron garments, and begins her quest. On her journey, she passes by herds of cows, camels and sheep, and a garden - all part of her husband's dowry. Realizing she must be near, she stops by a fountain to rest, where a servant of her husband is fetching water for her master, Shams-e-Qamar. Bibi Sarvar asks for some water to drink, and drops her ring inside the water jug. Shams-e-Qamar finds his ring when he is washing his hands, and finds his wife outside. They reunite, and he explains that, to survive in "the land of the Barzangis", she must do the opposite of what she is told to do. Shams-e-Qamar brings her inside as a servant, and his mother, a man-eating creature, forces difficult tasks on her: first, to eat a whole bowl; next, to clean the yard; thirdly, to wash a black piece white. With her husband's help, Bibi Sarvar accomplishes the tasks. Later, his mother asks her to get to her sister and fetch some dough - a trap, since the sister is also a man-eating creature. Shams-e-Qamar advises his wife how to proceed: compliment a crooked wall, compliment a pool of dirty water, exchange the fodder of two animals (a dog and a camel). She gets the dough and escapes from her husband's aunt's house. Finally, Shams-e-Qamar's mother betrothes her son to his cousin, and forces Bibi Sarvar to hold candles on her fingers during the ceremony. To protect his human wife, Shams-e-Qamar spews some saliva on her hands, and she also recites verses to hold off a new attempt by her mother-in-law and her sister. That same night, Shams-e-Qamar asks Bibi Sarvar to fetch some needles, a bit of salt and a water jug, for they will escape the same night. His man-eating family realizes they escaped, and go after her. On the road, Shams-e-Qamar and Bibi Sarvar throw behind them the needles to create a forest of thorns, the salt to create a mountain, and the water jug to create a sea. Freed from his mother and aunt, Shams-e-Qamar and Bibi Sarvar live happily.

==== Seven Pairs of Iron Shoes, Seven Iron Canes ====
Author Samad Behrangi published a tale from Azarbaijan in his book "افسانه‌های آذربایجان" ("Legends of Azarbaijan") with the title "هفت جفت کفش آهنی، هفت‌ تا عصای آهنی" ("Seven Pairs of Iron Shoes, Seven Iron Canes"). In this tale, three princesses send their father, the king, three melons of varying states of ripeness as analogy to their marriageability. The king interprets it is past time to marry his daughters, and assembles a crowd of suitors for each princess to throw apples at their husbands of choice. The youngest princess's apple lands near a snake, and she marries the animal. At night, the snake takes off its skin to become a youth. Some time later, the princess's sisters convince her to destroy the snakeskin by burning it, which she does, causing her husband to disappear. After a while, the princess decides to look for her husband, Malik Muhammad ("ملک محمد", in the Persian text), walking with seven pairs of iron shoes and with seven iron canes. After a long quest of seven years, she finally reaches a fountain, where she sees a servant fetching water for her husband. The princess asks for some water to drink. The maidservant refuses at first, since it is for her uncle, Malik Mohammad, a name that stirs the princess's heart. She reiterates the request and is given some water, then secretly drops her ring inside the jug. The maidservant brings the jug for Malik Mohammad's ablutions and he finds the ring inside it, then goes to meet his wife outside. He changes the princess into an apple to hide her from his man-eating Div-mother. Despite the trick, the Div-mother still senses the smell of a human nearby, and the snake husband changes the princess back to human form. Later, the creature forces the princess to perform difficult tasks: first, to sweep the floor with her eyebrows; next, to fill jars with her tears. The princess cries over the jars, but cannot fill it, so she cries for the impossibility of the task. Malik Mohammad appears to her and helps her by summoning some soft rain and a light wind to sweep the patio. His mother returns home, notices the task is done and suspects this was Malik Mohammad's doing.

Thirdly, the man-devouring div-mother orders the princess to gather bird feathers for blankets and mattresses, since her son's wedding is approaching - Malik Muhammad advises the princess to go to the forest and summon the birds by saying Malik Muhammad is getting married, so they will give her their feathers, and for her to say that he is dead to dismiss the birds. Lastly, the Div-mother orders the princess to go to her sister and fetch a box ("قوطی", in the Persian text, which the compiler noted to be "ماهانا قوتوسو" 'mahana qutusu' in the original Azerbaijani language). The princess's husband intercepts her, warns that this is a trap, since his aunt is another man-eating creature, and advises her how to proceed: compliment a pool of pus by saying it is rosewater; compliment a thorny bramble by saying it has needles and pins, exchange the correct fodder for animals (bones for a dog, hay for a horse), open a closed door and shut an open one, then meet with his aunt, take the box and escape as soon as possible. The princess follows his words to the letter, gets the box then runs back, and the Div-aunt commands the objects and the animals to stop her. The princess brings back the box and the div-mother suspects this was Malik Muhammad's doing. Finally, the Div-mother weds her son to his cousin. However, the snake prince kills his cousin and escapes with his true wife, the human princess. His mother learns of this and goes after them, but the princess and her husband throw objects behind them to stop the Divs: a blade creates a mountain of swords, a bit of salt creates a salt marsh, and finally a water jug creates a river behind them. The Devs manage to cross it, and the princess and her husband change into a melon orchard and a garden-keeper. The Devs are fooled, but the dev-mother picks up a melon and they stop their pursuit. Malik Muhammad restores himself and the princess to hman form, and she notices a missing toe. The dev-aunt and dev-mother realize they were tricked and return to the location of the garden, but find nothing, since the princess and her husband escape to their city, where they are free to live their lives.

==== Sabzeh Ghaba ====
In an Iranian tale from Sanjan Region with the title "سبزهقبا" (Transliteration: Sabzeh Ghaba; English: "Green Robe"), a man lives with his wife and daughter Bibihama ("بيبيهما"), who works with flower weaving. After his wife dies, the man remarries, and Bibihama's stepmother forces the girl to overwork herself. One day, during her weaving, she accidentally drops her yarn and it rolls along some trees until it reaches a castle in a deep valley. Bibihama remembers her mother told her a demon (dev) lives in the castle. She also knows there are two fountains, one with dark water and another with limpid water, from which she is to drink from. Bibihama goes to the castle, drinks from the clear spring and becomes beautiful. In the castle lives a youth named Sabzeh Ghaba, who falls in love with Bibihama. Sabzeh Ghaba's mother wishes to marry him to her niece, and opposes her son's love for the human Bibihama. Thus, his mother forces the girl to do impossible tasks: first, to clean up the yard in front of the castle. Bibihama cannot sweep the yard, since it returns to its original state. Sabzeh Ghaba approaches her, and she, in tears, explains the situation. Sabzeh Ghaba recites a verdi and the yard is cleaned up, but he advises her not to tell his mother about it. Next, the dev-mother orders Bibihama to do the dishes for Sabezh Ghaba's upcoming wedding. The girl cannot wash the dishes, for they return to their dirty state. Sabzeh Ghaba helps her again. His mother discovers the youth's help, then ties ten candles to Bibihama's fingers, which she is to hold until they melt. Bibihama cries out that her fingers are burning, while Sabzeh Ghaba says that it is his heart that is. Sabzeh Ghaba recites a verdi to put out the candles with a wind, then drops a bottle with his aunt's life inside it. The aunt faints, and Sabzeh Ghaba takes Bibihama and both escape through the sky. Sabzeh Ghaba's aunt and mother chase after the couple, but they are disguised as a pair of clouds and elude their pursuers. After the pursuers leave, Sabzeh Ghaba and Bibihama are free to live their lives.

=== Literary versions ===
Author Behzad Sohrabi published the tale The Man in Green Robe, retold from an "ancient fairy tale of Iran", with similar plot points. In this tale, the king prepares a suitor selection test with his daughters: each is to take a trained falcon and release it; wherever it lands, if there is a suitor nearby, she is to marry him. Princess Golnar, the third and youngest daughter of the king, releases hers and it flies beyond the castle's walls, to a desolate place. She releases it twice again and it still lands in the same place. She eventually marries a mysterious "Man in Green Robe". After the wedding, he warns her against a prohibition imposed on him. She disobeys, he disappears and she has to find him in a distant city, by wearing down seven pairs of iron shoes and carrying an iron cane. When she reaches her destination, she meets her mother-in-law, and begs her to promise not to harm her on her son's name. Her husband, the Man in Green Robe, is set to be married to his cousin, and her mother-in-law forces her to do some chores for her, including bearing a letter to his aunt with a command to kill the princess. Before Golnar visits the woman, her husband intercepts her and exchanges the letter for another with a request for a pair of "scissors that cut and sew by themselves". Having failed the first time, the mother sends her again with another letter, and again the Man in Green Robe replaces the command with a simple request for a musical instrument ("the tambourine that sings and dances"). As his wedding ceremony approaches, the Man in Green Robe dispatches his human wife to the wilderness and instructs her to wait for him with ten candles on her fingers, while he deals with the false bride. After ruining his wedding, he meets Golnar and they escape from his parents by transforming into different things. After the dust settles, they regain human form and create a kingdom for themselves with his magic powers. Some time later, his father-in-law visits them and names Golnar's husband as his successor.

=== Other regions ===
==== Dagestan ====
===== Lezgin people =====
In a variant from the Lezgin people titled "Сад-Эскендер" ("Sad-Eskender"), collected in Dagestan, a poor man lives with his three daughters, Gul-Khanum, Guzel-Khanum and Tavat-Khanum. One day, he goes to the open fields and says his prayers there, when a snake slithers from beneath a stone and asks to marry one of the man's daughters. The man returns home and tells his daughters about it, the elder two cursing their father for a preposterous proposal, but the youngest, Tavat-Khanum, agrees to become the snake's wife. Serpents come to take the girl to their master and descend a hole to a chamber. She waits there for her spouse and the snake comes. The snake asks the girl to step lightly on its skin; a human youth appears and reveals his name is Sad-Eskender. They live as a married couple for some time, until one day, Tavat-Khanum meets an old woman. The woman tells the girl to ask her husband how to burn his snakeskin. Tavat-Khanum does exactly that twice, and is slapped each time. The third time, Sad-Eskender suspects his wife might destroy the skin and warns her against it, but reveals it can be burned in onion peels. The girl burns it and her husband disappears. She wanders for three years in search for him, until she stops by a spring, where three women are fetching water. The girl asks for some water, the youngest woman gives her a jug to drink from and Tavat-Khanum drops her ring in it. Inside a nearby house, Sad-Eskender finds the ring and orders the woman to bring Tavat-Khanum in. Sad-Eskender explains that the house belongs to an azhdaha who wants to marry him to her daughter, and thus Tavat-Khanum becomes her servant. After a month, Sad-Eskender asks Tavat-Khanum to get them a xurjin (saddlebag) with razors, salt, barley and a jar of water. They escape on a magical horse in the dark of night. The next day, the azhdaha knocks on her daughter's room, sees her dead body and notices that Sad-Eskender escaped with the servant. The azhdaha mounts a horse and goes after the pair. The couple throws the objects behind them, the razors, the salt and the barley becoming mountains, but the azhdaha passes through the obstacles. Lastly, they throw the jug of water, which becomes a vast lake before them. With their magical horses, the couple flies over the lake to the other margin. Azhdaha arrives at the lake and tries to ride her horse across it, but they sink to the bottom. The couple reaches a city and Sad-Eskender leaves Tavat-Khanum in the cemetery, while he looks for a job. After some misadventures, they find each other again and live happily.

===== Kumyk people =====
In a variant from the Kumyks, collected in Dagestan with the Kumyk title "Йыланхан" (transliteration: "Yılankhan"; Russian: Змей-хан, romanized: Zmey-khan, lit. 'Serpent King'), an old man has three daughters and goes to the mosque to pray ("namaz", in the original text). One day, after his prayers, the man goes to put on his shoes and finds a curled up serpent in one of them. The man tries to shoo the animal away, but the serpent demands one of the man's daughters. The man goes home and talks to his three daughters about it: the elder two refuse to have a snake for a husband, but the youngest agrees to be the snake's bride. The snake tells the man he will be at a shabby barn at the edge of the village, and his future bride shall come there after dark. Once there, the girl fears the snake, but the animal takes off its skin and becomes a handsome man, and the barn changes into a palace. The next morning, the man gives the girl a golden ring and turns back into a snake, and warns her not to tell her sisters about the secret hole. After he leaves, the palace turns back into a barn. One day, her sisters visit her and are told everything. Now, jealous of the youngest's good fortune, they prepare a trap for the snake bridegroom the next time they meet: both women hide some blades near the hole through which the snake slithers. He comes through the hole, but is hurt by the blades. Badly injured, he disappears from view. The next day, the girl sees the blood and the blades and remembers his warning. She then decides to seek him out. After a long search, the maiden reaches a fountain, where two maidservants come to fetch water for their master, the Serpent King ("Zmey-khan"), who injured himself when he went to the "upper world". The maiden begs for a drink of water, and drops her ring as a token, so that her husband may notice her. The servants take the jug to the Zmey-khan, and he recognizes the ring. He orders the servant to bring the maiden inside the castle, and tells his wife that his family (mother and aunt) are both azhdaha, evil draconic-like beings, and they have set him up with another bride. His mother notices the strange connection between the youth and the maiden, and decides to force her to do chores for her. First, the maiden is to sweep the road between the mother's house and the aunt's. Zmey-khan summons a wind to sweep the road. Next, the maiden is to bring yeast from the aunt's house. Zmey-khan advises his human wife to compliment the thorns and dirty rivers on the way there, to give the correct food to a dog and a horse, take the yeast and flee as soon as possible. At last, the azhdaha family takes the serpent youth to marry the false bride they have chosen for him. He kills the bride, takes his former wife and both escape from the azhdaha family. The creatures go after the pair, and Zmey-khan throws objects behind them to create a dense forest, a salt marsh, and two tall trees. Lastly, he throws behind two spindle heads that he magics to become two millstones to crush his mother and aunt.

===== Dargin people =====
In a variant from the Dargins, collected in Dagestan with the title "Агайхан" ("Agaykhan"), a famous plowman lives in a village with his three daughters. He earns his living by sowing the fields and harvesting the grain. One day, he goes to check on the fields and sees that a large snake surrounds it, "like a ring". The snake demands one of the man's daughters in marriage, otherwise it will destroy the fields. The man asks his three daughters if anyone offers herself to the snake, but only the youngest agrees to fulfill the snake's proposal. The man questions the snake about his daughter's fate, and it answers it will come in three days, build a splendid palace in front of his house, where they shall celebrate the wedding. The snake reveals a human shape and his name: Agaykhan. Some time later, her sisters come to visit her and become jealous of her good fortune. Inquiring about the snake husband, the girl reveals he sheds his snake skin to become a man. While they sweep the palace, the sisters find the snake skin and burn it. To the girl's horror, the snake husband disappears into a hole in the ground. She decides to venture into the hole to bring her husband back to the upper world. Down there, she reaches a fountain near a palace, where a young servant is fetching water. She drops her ring into the jug that is taken to Agaykhan and he recognizes the token. The prince takes the girl inside and reveals his past: he is the son of bloodthirsty Wakhig; he wanted to go to the upper world to find a bride there, but his mother tried to dissuade him, since no one would marry a snake. He then warns her that his mother will force her to perform difficult chores for her. First, Wakhig orders the girl to clean her house using needles. Agaykhan summons a wind to sweep the house. Next, she is to thatch the roof with bird feathers and to go behind the mountains to get a zurna and drums for Agaykhan's wedding to another bride. The snake husband advises her on all three tasks, but on the third the girl must drink from a river of blood and bile and praise it, to give hay to the horse and a bone to the dog, close an open door and open a closed one, get the instruments and escape. At last, Agaykhan's wedding happens, but he kills his second bride and escapes with the human wife by shapeshifting into pigeons.

==== Central Asia ====
Researcher Aziza Shanazarova summarized a narrative from the Central Asian work Maẓhar al-ʿajāʾib by a Sufi scholar, dated to the 16th century. In this tale, titled The Story of Zirak-i Afkār, a king in Yemen named Rabīʿ ibn Kalāb (or in Persian, Shāh Nigār) offers to marry his three daughters Rāżīya, Marżīya and ʿĀlima and gives each of them an arrow, for them to shoot and marry the person where the arrows land on. The elder two marry, respectively, a minister’s son and a chieftain's son. The youngest princess's arrow lands inside a snake's hole and she marries its denizen, a snake named Zirak-i Afkār ('intelligent thoughts'). On the wedding night, the snake turns into a human youth, and asks Alima to keep the secret, otherwise she would be "punished" by a steel staff and would have to wear iron boots (mūza-yi āhanīn). One year later, the princess's elder sisters pay her a visit and learn of the snake brother-in-law. Alima spills the secret, and her sisters convince her to burn the snakeskin (ṣūrat) to keep him in his true nature (sīrat). The princess does as instructed and tosses the snakeskin into the fire. Due to the burning smell, Zirak-i Afkār wakes up, turns into a dove and admonishes her by calling her Naghzak-i Nādān ('ignorant little beauty'), then flies away. Alima decides to go after him by wearing iron boots and walking with a steel staff through the desert, where she passes by herds of horses, camels and sheep. She also discovers her husband's whereabouts: he has returned to his family and has been living with his mother, an infidel (kāfira) giant (bārzangī) in a place called Chahār Bāgh ('four gardens'). However, after he left his human wife, Zirak-i Afkār was married by his mother to her sister’s daughter, and has a personal servant (kanīzak) to kill his human wife if she appears. As Alima reaches Chahar Bagh, the kanizak, who is Muslim (muʾmina), helps the couple reunite: the princess drops a ring inside a waterjug which the servant brings to Zirak-i Afkār to wash his hands; as the water washes his hands, he notices his wife's ring and learns she is there. The now human serpent prince, Zirak-i Afkār, goes to meet his human wife and tells her that his mother was the ruler of "the hidden kingdom" (vālī-yi bilād-i maknūn) of non-Muslims, and protects her when his mother comes to visit every 40 days, by turning her into a broom. Despite this, his giantess mother still scents the blood of a human nearby. After she leaves, Zirak-i Afkār teaches Naghzak-i Nādān "concealed secrets" (sirr-i maknūn) and "divine knowledge" (ʿulūm-i ilāhī). Eventually, Zirak-i Afkār introduces his wife to his mother, on the promise that the giantess will not harm her. She makes such a vow, but begins to hound the human princess with "obstacles and hardships", which she bypasses with her supernatural husband's help: first, the giantess mother mixes seeds of sesame and millet with earth, which the princess is to separate; next, she gives the princess a piece of black felt and orders her to wash it white. After the princess does each task, the barzangi mother suspects her son helped the princess and calls it Zirak-i Afkār's doing. Thirdly, the giantess orders Naghzak-i Nādān to go to her sister's house and fetch clothes ("جامه", in the text) from there - which is a trap, since her sister has not made the same vow. Before the princess goes there, her husband intercepts her and teaches her how to proceed: she will pass by pool of bitter water and sweet water, walls and gates, and she is to exchange the fodder of two animals (bone for a dog, straw for a camel), enter his aunt's house, tie her hairs to a pillar ("ستون", in the text) of her house, take the clothes and escape. Naghzak-i Nādān does as instructed and fetches the clothes; his aunt commands the animals to stop her, but they hold their peace. At last, the giantess places a wick on Naghzak-i Nādān's hands and forces her to illuminate the couple for the whole night until dawn, in hopes the burning wick burns the human princess completely. Zirak-i Afkār realizes his mother's ploy, takes off the wick from his true wife's hands and kills his cousin, then escapes from his mother's house with some objects (among which a dry thorn and a mirror). The next day, the giantess mother finds out that her niece is dead and her son escaped with the princess, then chases after them. On the road back to Yemen, the pair sees that the giantess is after them and throws behind the objects to deter her: the fourth time, the thorn becomes a forest of them, and the fifth time, the mirror becomes a large sea between them. The giantess tries to cross the sea, but she drowns. The pair returns safely to Yemen, and restores the Yemeni royal couple's health. According to Shanazarova, the tale is contained in a copy of Maẓhar al-ʿajāʾib, catalogued as MS 8716 and dated to the year 1766.

== See also ==
- The Snake-Prince Sleepy-Head
- Graciosa and Percinet
- The Green Serpent
- The King of Love
- Prunella
- Ulv Kongesøn (Prince Wolf)
- The Golden Root
- The Horse-Devil and the Witch
- Tulisa, the Wood-Cutter's Daughter
- Khastakhumar and Bibinagar
- La Fada Morgana
- The Son of the Ogress
- The Tale of the Woodcutter and his Daughters
- Grünkappe
- Baemsillang (The Serpent Husband)
- Amewakahiko soshi
- The Little Crab (Greek folktale)
- Sultan Mar (Iranian play by Bahram Beyzai)
- The Princess Who Could Not Keep a Secret
- The Tale of Aftab
- Sabzqaba
