= Ame no Wakahiko sōshi (otogi-zōshi) =

The Tale of Amewakahiko (Japanese: Ame no Wakahiko sōshi) is a medieval Japanese story about a human maiden who marries a husband of divine origin in snake form, loses him due to her breaking his trust, and goes after him at his father's celestial home, where she is forced to perform hard tasks for him.

The tale belongs to the international cycle of the Animal as Bridegroom or The Search for the Lost Husband, wherein a human princess marries a supernatural husband, loses him, and goes on a quest to find him. It has also been compared to the Graeco-Roman myth of Cupid and Psyche, in that the heroine is forced to perform difficult tasks for a witch or her mother-in-law.

== Sources ==
The story, which features deity Ame no Wakahiko (sometimes written as Ame-waka-miko and Ame-waka-hiko), appears in Japanese medieval literature of the Muromachi period (Otogi-zōshi). It is alternatively known as Ame no Wakahiko sōshi or Ame no Wakahiko monogatari (The Tale of Ame no Wakahiko). According to Japanologist Horst Hammitzsch, the story is known in Japan as Amewakahiko-monogatari, Ame-wakamiko-koimonogatari, and Tanabata-sôshi.

=== Authorship ===
According to professor Masako Sato, the calligraphy of the text indicates that its author is Emperor Gohanazono, while French curator Jeannine Auboyer dated the manuscript to ca. 1450. Hammitzsch, citing Rumpf, sources the original text of his German translation to a scroll dated to the 1400s, with illustrations by a court painter named Tosa Hirochika, active around 1457-1465. Later, the story was transported to book form among popular literature by an unknown author in the 16th century, and enjoyed widespread popularity.

=== Literary history ===
According to Japanese scholar Kazuo Tokuda, this story of Tanabata can be divided into two groups or "lineages": lineage A, representing a group of scrolls containing shorter texts, and lineage B, which has longer texts, with scholarship debating whether a lineage originated or derived from the other. However, according to researcher Chi-fuyu Ōtsuki, modern research indicates that the shorter form texts originated the longer form ones, with the illustrations accompanying the tale also following different lineages.

Scholarship separates the study on the extant literary versions into two formats, following Hisako Matsunami: picture scrolls (emaki) and illustrated booklets (sasshi). Ōtsuki reports four handscrolls (emaki) and seven booklets (sasshi) that comprise the "long form" corpus of the story.

== Summary ==
In this tale, Prince Ame no Wakahiko takes the form of a serpent. In Hammitszch's German translation, the story is set during the reign of Emperor Jimmu. (Note: The reference to Emperor Jimmu appears in a version of Ame-wakahiko monogatari from lineage B (longer texts).) One day, he delivers a letter to the maidservant of a wealthy man. The maidservant gives the letter to her master, who opens it: within, a command for the man to surrender his three daughters to the serpent in marriage, else it will kill his entire family. The man's two elder daughters refuse to marry the animal, but the youngest decides to be married to the snake.

The letter also instructed the man to build a palace near a pond, which is to serve as the couple's residence after their marriage. Soon, the human woman is delivered to the palace to await for her snake husband. An enormous serpent emerges from the pond and talks to its bride, assuaging her fears and asking for her to cut off his head. The human bride does as intended "with the blade of a fingernail clipper", and a handsome man comes out of the snakeskin. The man hides the snakeskin in a Chinese box and they enjoy their marital life. He later reveals he is a heavenly deity named Dragon Prince (or Dragon King - a kairyūō), and that he must travel somewhere, and asks her to wait for his return. He also begs his wife not to open the chest, lest she will never see him again. His wife asks him what can she do to find his way to him, and he answers that she must seek a woman in Kyoto and buy a gourd.

After some time, the wife is visited by her sisters, who discover that their brother-in-law, the snake, is in fact a handsome man. Spurred by envy, they convince their youngest sister to open the Chinese box. Only smoke comes out of the box, and later she learns he cannot return to her. She must, then, seek him out.

She goes to Kyoto, buys a gourd and uses its vines to reach the heavenly realm. Now on Heaven, the girl asks directions from a man in hunting robes (the Evening Star), then from a man with a broom (the Comet), and finally from a cluster of people (the Pleiades), who cannot seem to know him. The girl then finds a person on a palanquin, (Note: Chi-fuyu Ōtsuki indicates that the person on the palanquin is the Morning Star.) who directs her to a jeweled mansion built on azure stone. At last, the girl enters the mansion and finds her heavenly husband, but he changes her into objects (an armrest, then a fan or a pillow) to hide her from his father, an oni. Eventually, the oni father-in-law discovers her and sets four tasks on his son's human wife: to herd a thousand cattle in one day and one night, to transport one million grains of rice from one granary to another, to stay in a warehouse full of centipedes, and in a warehouse full of snakes. She accomplishes all four tasks with her husband's assistance, since he gave her a magical sleeve. At the end of this tale, the oni father lets his son and the wife meet once a month, but she mistakes it for "once a year" and thus, the lovers can only reunite during the Tanabata.

== Analysis ==
=== Tale type ===
The tale has been compared to tale type ATU 425, "The Search for the Lost Husband", of the international Aarne-Thompson-Uther Index, and to the Graeco-Roman story of Cupid and Psyche, by writer Apuleius.

=== Motifs ===
A motif that varies between the emaki and sasshi sources is how the heroine reaches the celestial realm with the help of the gourd, following her husband's instructions: the heroine either finds a yūgao (a calabash with floration) or a ichiya-hisago (a gourd that grows overnight) - both vegetables being able to create a bridge upwards.

=== Mythological connections ===
According to scholars, the story serves as another etiological tale for the Tanabata or Star Festival.

== Variants ==
=== Bootes and Weaver ===
In a Japanese tale translated to Russian as "Волопас и ткачиха" ("Bootes and Weaver"), a rich lord lives next to a river. One day, the maidservant goes to wash some clothes in the river, when a large snake delivers her a letter to be given to the local lord. The lord reads the letter, which contains the snake's demands: he wishes to marry one of the lord's daughters, lest he kills his family, and that a square-shaped house is to be built next to a certain river. Afraid, the lord summons his daughters to ask which will go with the snake: the first two refuse to marry him, save for the youngest, called Otohime, who agrees to marry the snake to save her family. The lord builds the squared house with seventeen ken after three days and sends his daughter there. Otohime waits for the snake, who emerges from the water and enters the palace. Despite his size, the snake tells Otohime not to fear and asks her to find something to cut up his skin. The girl grabs a pair of scissors and cuts up the snake's neck; the snakeskin deflates and he becomes a handsome youth. They live together in the palace in happiness. One day, the youth reveals his name is prince Bootes, the son of a dragon king, who with his father alternates living in the sea and in the Heavens. He explains he is being summoned again and may not return in 7 days, nor in 14 days, nor in 21 days, after which he will not return anymore to her. Otohime asks how she can find him again: Bootes tells her to follow the lake margin for 30 li/ri until she finds a large oak with a witch under it, who can provide her with a magic conch. Bootes also gives his wife a gem-encrusted box, telling her not to open it, lest he never returns to her. After Bootes leaves for the Heavens, Otohime feels bored at home and her sisters pay her a visit. The pair admire their cadette's life of luxury and begin to envy her, then find the gem-encrusted box. The sisters goad Otohime into opening the box, despite her husband's prohibition, and she opens it: only a white smoke comes out of it. The sisters are disappointed and return home, while Otohime ponders about her action.

After her husband does not return, like he warned her, she follows his instructions and finds a witch under the oak, who gives her a conch to reach the Heavens. Up there, Otohime finds a girl with a golden dress (the Evening Star), who directs her to a woman with long braid (the Comet). Otohime also asks Orion, a youth trailing after the Comet, and other stars on the heavenly plane, but no one knows the location of prince Bootes's palace. Suddenly, an old man in a golden palanquin appears and points Otohime to the right direction of Bootes's jasper palace. Otohime reaches her husband's sky palace and shouts for him; he appears to her and warns her his father is a terrible Dragon King, so he turns his human wife into objects to fool his father, like into a pillow and a handfan. Despite this, his Dragon King father still senses a human smell, and goes to his son's quarters, surprising Bootes in the act with Otohime. Bootes explains Otohime is his wife, and the Dragon King decides to take her in as a servant, but he intends to destroy her. First, he orders her to herd his large cattle of three thousand oxen in one day and bring them to the field the following morning.. Otohime cries for the impossibility of the task, when Bootes appears to her, rips a sleeve of his clothes and gives it to her with a magic spell to perform the task. Next, the Dragon King orders her to carry his thousand koku of rice from the eastern barn to the western barn in a single day - Otohime summons an army of ants to carry the rice grains and fulfills the task. The Dragon King notices there is a missing grain and Otohime finds it on a lame ant. Thirdly, he locks her up in a barn full of centipedes for her to be devoured, but she uses the magic sleeve to make the insects disappear. Defeated, the Dragon King allows Otohime and his son Bootes to meet once a month, which Otohime misunderstands as "once a year". Thus, the Dragon King creates a silver river between the spouses, and they can only meet during the Tabanata.

=== The Serpent of the Sky ===
In a Japanese tale sourced to Kagoshima and translated to French with the title Le serpent du ciel ("The Serpent of the Sky"), an old woman is washing the clothes in the river, when a serpent appears in the river and gives her a letter, with a request to marry the woman's lord's daughter. The woman is stunned at what to do, when the serpent threatens to devour her. The washerwoman returns with the letter to the lord, who receives the news with fright. He asks his daughters (whose names the story says it does not know) if they consent to marry the serpent: the elder daughter vehemently refuses to do so. He then turns to the youngest daughter, who is more intelligent and more devoted to her parents; the cadette agrees, if it is her father's wish. The man agrees with her decision and places her next to the river. The serpent appears to her and asks her to use some scissors to cut apart the serpent's skin. The girl does so, and out of the serpent skin comes a handsome youth. They live in happiness. One day, the youth tells the girl he has to return to the Heavens for some reason, and gives her a box which she must not open, lest he does not return to Earth. Some fifteen days after he leaves, the elder sister pays a visit to her sister and finds the box. The serpent's wife warns her against opening it, but the elder sister does so; a plume of smoke comes out of the box. The serpent's wife waits for her husband's return after the opening of the box, to no avail. She then decides to search for him in the Heavens. Up in the Heavens, she does not locate her husband at first, and has unsavory encounters with demons and every sort of beings. At last, she reunites with her husband on the edge of the Milky Way, and they spend their days in great happiness. Thus, the day of their reunion is July 7th.

== See also ==
- Paemshillang
- Emakimono
