= The Green Serpent =

French fairy tale by Marie Catherine d'Aulnoy

Le Serpentin Vert (translated as Green Serpent or Green Dragon) is a French fairy tale written by Marie Catherine d'Aulnoy, popular in its day and representative of European folklore, that was published in her book New Tales, or Fairies in Fashion (Contes Nouveaux ou Les Fées à la Mode), in 1698. The serpent is representative of a European dragon. His description is: "he has green wings, a many-coloured body, ivory jaws, fiery eyes, and long, bristling hair."

The Green Dragon is really a handsome king placed under a spell for seven years by Magotine, a wicked fairy. In many ways the tale is based on the story of Eros and Psyche, to which the narration pays conscious homage when referring to the "discovery" of the Green Dragon.

== Plot ==
=== Feast scene ===
This story begins with a celebration feast for the birth of two twin princesses, who would later be named Laideronnette (the ugly one) and Bellotte (the Pretty one). The King and Queen invite many fairies but forget to invite Magotine, the sister of Carabosse, the oldest and most wicked fairy that existed. When she finds out about the party, she is so furious for not being invited that she places a spell on Laideronnette which turns her into the ugliest woman in the world. The other fairies intercede and persuade Magotine to stop before she can cast a similar spell on Bellotte.

=== Tower scene ===
Years pass by. Laideronnette grows up intelligent but lonely. She asks to live in a tower so that she does not have to see anyone. However one day she roams outside, and a Green Serpent sees her and begins to take an interest in her. She is so terrified of the Green Serpent at first sight that she flees from him, and accidentally gets swept out to sea. The Green Serpent appears swimming alongside her boat but, refusing his assistance, she nearly perishes in the ocean.

=== Faraway kingdom scene ===
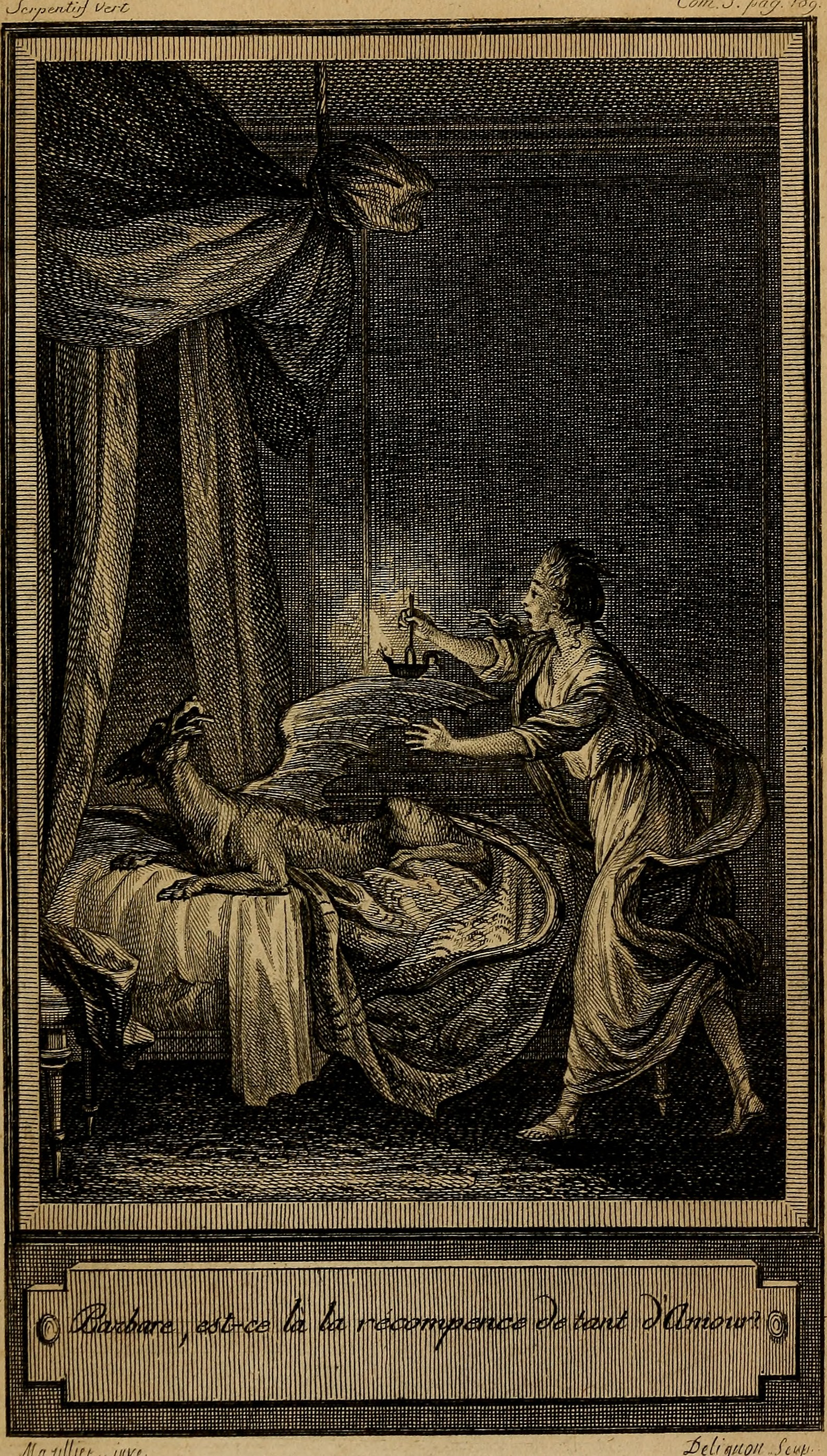
The princess looks aghast at the hideous dragon on the bridal bed. —"Is this how you repay my love?"

When Laideronnette regains consciousness she finds that she has been saved and taken to be the guest of an unknown king in a far away kingdom. The Green Serpent's identity as the spell-bound king of the kingdom is revealed to the readers. However, Laideronnette is not taken to see the king and does not learn this secret. All she knows is that an unseen king is taking very good care of her. He starts talking to her at night, and proves such a good conversation companion over the years that she falls in love with this kind stranger, sight unseen, and they get married.

The king convinces his wife to wait until the end of the seven-year period to see what he looks like, or else the wicked enchantment which forces him to hide his appearance will start all over again. Queen Laideronnette compares her own marriage with that of Eros and Psyche in Greek mythology, which is her favourite reading, and noticing the similarities between their two stories, she determines to resist being "like Psyche" and to wait patiently. However, just as Psyche, and for the same reasons, she ends by being convinced by her family, whom she had invited to visit, to take a surreptitious look at her husband during the night. When she discovers that he is the very same Green Serpent that she once was so afraid of, war breaks out in the kingdom, and Magotine ruins the kingdom. The Green Serpent is then sent into Hades to begin his penance again from the start, while Queen Laideronnette is taken to become Magotine's prisoner and servant.

=== Tribulations and tests ===
The serpent king asks the good fairy Protectress to assist Laideronnette to complete three impossible trials that Magotine thinks up to torment her: first, to spin cobwebs into hair and then the hair itself into fishnets strong enough to catch salmon; second, to climb a mountain wearing iron shoes and a millstone around the neck. In her third errand as a servant, Queen Laideronnette is commanded to find the "Fount of Discretion" and to bring back its water with her in a pitcher full of holes, which she achieves with the help of magical birds. When she drinks from it, she becomes herself discreet, no longer plagued by the excessive curiosity which had caused her so many problems. When she splashes some water on her face, her ugliness vanishes and she regains her natural beauty.

=== Enchanted forest ===
Well pleased, the good fairy then renames her Queen Discreet and sends her into an enchanted forest to hide for several years, as her challenge had been expected to last a long time and coming back early would imply that she had received outside help. Finally however when a period of time or imprisonment for the Green Serpent has come to an end, Queen Discreet returns to Magotine, who is much displeased by her transformations. As an ultimate challenge which she expects her to fail, Magotine instructs her to go into Hades and obtain for her some "water of long life" from Proserpina, the queen of Hades.

=== Descent into Hades ===
With the help and protection of the personification of "Love", who takes pity on her, Queen Discreet goes down into Hades. There she speaks to Proserpina, reminding her husband is held captive in her domain, and he obtains from her a flask filled with water of long life. Now cured of her curiosity, Discreet successfully refrains from drinking from the water, although the flask was intentionally badly stoppered by Proserpina, to induce her into temptation, as had been expected by Magotine. In Hades, "Love" uses his powers to restores the serpent king back to his original human form, and Discreet and her husband are re-united in Hades. Finally, "Love" brings the couple back to Magotine, inducing Magotine to break her spells against the king and queen, and then sends the couple back to their kingdom where they will live happily ever after. In the end, a moral is given: unnecessary curiosity is bad, discretion is good, and Love wins over all, even against the most ill-intended, provided one plays one's part.

== Analysis ==
=== Parallels ===
German philologist Ludwig Friedländer listed Le Serpentin Vert (translated as "The Green Dragon") as part of the "Cupid and Psyche" cycle of stories (which later became known as "The Search for the Lost Husband"). Similarly, scholar Jacques Barchilon considers the tale a literary retelling by MMe. d'Aulnoy of the Apuleian story.

The inhuman husband tells Laideronette the story of Cupid and Psyche as a cautionary tale to convince her to wait until the right time to reveal himself. However, her relatives provoke her in breaking the taboo, despite knowing the story. According to Barbara Fass Leavy, Laideronette "must experience" Psyche's journey herself to learn the lesson intended.

=== Tale type ===
According to scholar Jack Zipes, the tale of The Green Serpent is classified in the international system as Aarne–Thompson–Uther type ATU 425, "The Search for The Lost Husband", stories where a girl or a princess is betrothed to a monstrous bridegroom, à la Beauty and the Beast. More specifically, the tale is type 425B, "Son of the Witch", a category of tales wherein the heroine is forced to work for a witch on dangerous and impossible tasks.

In the Catalogue of French Folktales, French scholars Paul Delarue and Marie-Louise Thèneze classify the tale as type 425A (or French sous-type A), following Jan-Öjvind Swahn's classification: Cupid and Psyche is type 425A with the witch's tasks, whereas type 425B contains the motif of gifts to the heroine and the "buying three nights" episode.

== Translations ==
The story is sometimes translated as The Green Dragon, after its main character.

French illustrator Edmund Dulac translated the tale as The Green Serpent in his book Fairy Tales of the Allied Nations.

Literary critic Roger Sale translated the tale as Green Snake.

The tale was also translated by professor A. S. Byatt as The Great Green Worm and included in compilation Wonder Tales: Six Stories of Enchantment, edited by Marina Warner.

== Legacy ==
The tale was one of many from d'Aulnoy's pen to be adapted to the stage by James Planché, as part of his Fairy Extravaganza. He also translated the tale as Green-Serpent, and renamed it The Island of Jewels when he adapted the tale to the stage.

== See also ==
- Baemsillang (The Serpent Husband)
- Amewakahiko soshi
