= Umamba =

Zulu folktale

Umamba, Umamba kaMakula or uMamba kaMaquba is a Zulu folktale about a youth born to a mother that hides him within a snakeskin. He marries a human woman who disenchants him.

== Source ==
An English language translation of the tale was provided by reverend Henry Callaway in his book on Zulu tales, which he collected from a source named Lydia (Umkasetemba). Russian Africanist Igor L. Snegirev translated it as "Мамба" ("Mamba").

== Summary ==
Callaway's version, titled Umamba, begins thus: a chief marries two sisters, one of them becomes the chieftainess, to the envy of the other. Both sisters are pregnant and give birth, the queen's sister takes the queen's first three children and kills them. On the fourth pregnancy, the queen gives birth to an imamba (snake) she names Umamba ("The imamba-man"). Her sister also gives birth to a boy she names Unsimba ("The cat-man", based on insimba, a wild cat). The queen's sister is suspected to have killed her newborn nephews with some kind of medicine, but it remains unproven for the time being.

Years later, girls appear to marry either Unsimba or Umamba. The human is appreciated by the brides, but the snake son is feared. Their father states that Umamba must be married first, but Unsimba scoffs at the idea. One day, a pair of sisters appear to marry the two half-brothers. One of the sisters, named Unthlamvu-yobuthlalu, chooses Unsimba, who does not love her, and her sister Unthlamvu-yetusi chooses Umamba. She is questioned about her decision on marrying Umamba, but she insists on her decision.

The sisters are directed to the huts of their respective spouses. Unthlamvu-yetusi enters Umamba's hut and sees he is a snake. She says she has no fear of him devouring her, since he does not devour people. He asks her to close the hut, prepare the mat for him to lie on and to anoint him with a pot of fat - chores he reveals are performed by a companion. She does two of the requests, but is afraid to anoint him with the fat.

The next day, she eats a meal in the morning and in the evening he asks again to be anointed by his wife. He then asks to be stretched. His wife agrees and stretchs his snake body. She notices the skin on her hands and drops it. When she looks at her husband, she sees a handsome human. He reveals his whole story: his mother's previous three children died and they suspected her sister was responsible, so his mother, before Umamba was born, asked her brother to find the skin of an imamba so she could wrap her son in it.

They decide to return to the sisters' father, Umamba and his wife concealing his true nature, and he comes in snake form to the wedding ceremony. Each bridegroom enters a hut to be adorned for the ceremony. Umamba summons his companion and asks to anoint him and to remove the snakeskin. He appears as human at the gathering and his parents rejoice.

== Variants ==
According to 20th century researcher Marianne Brindley, "different versions" of the story "circulate in Nkandla".

=== The Bewitched King ===
In a version collected from a Zulu man named Ukolekile and titled Umambakamaqula, The Bewitched King by Reverend O. Stavem, a king has many daughters. One day, the eldest says she will marry uMambakamaqula. She meets a crippled woman fetching water and helps her unload the jar of water. The crippled woman, as thanks, tells the girl her future husband is a snake, but tells her not to be afraid, for she instruct her on how to cautiously approach the serpentine being.

The king's daughter arrives at her husband's kraal and follows the instructions of the crippled woman. uMambakamaqula comes at her through an entrance of the hut and coils itself around his bride, but she remains unflinching. The serpent husband uncoils and goes out of the hut to summon the tribes for a bridal dance. He dresses his bride in splendid garments and she returns home.

When the younger daughter sees her sister has returned, she decides to follow the same path. The younger girl meets the same crippled woman, who asks for help, but girl refuses to. She arrived at the same kraal and entered the hut. When she sees the snake being, she flees the place back to her own home, the serpent hot in pursuit.

The younger sister tells the elder that a giant serpent was following her and is waiting by the river near their kraal. The elder says the serpent is her husband and that it should be invited to a celebratory feast at their kraal. After the celebration and everyone left the couple alone, the serpent's wife asks for people to bring her wood. She lights a fire on the hut with the snake still inside, and it burns to death.

The wife takes the serpent's remains (only the bones), a bunch of medicinal herbs and orders her brothers to prepare clothes for a man. She goes outside the kraal, digs up a hole, puts the medicinal herbs in and lights a fire. She then places the bones on the hole, places some more medicinal herbs on them and closes the hole. In the afternoon, a man bursts out of the hole where the bones have been buried. The wife clothes him and they leave together.

=== Mamba of Maquba ===
In a version collected by Sibusisa Nyembezi, both girls are drawing water in the river when the older's calabash breaks. Afraid their mother will scold her, she sends the younger to report the event. The mother says the older girl should not worry, but the younger lies and tells the older their mother is furious. The elder girl decides to depart and marry Mamba kaMaquba. On her journey, she meets an old lady who wants someone to lick her pus and a person carrying a jug on her buttocks. The girl helps both strangers and they direct her to go ahead to find marriage. The girl arrives at the house of Mamba of Maquba, but no one is there, since he is herding the cattle. The girl is instructed to grind the sorghum very finely and, in the afternoon, is sent to Mamba's hut to wait there. Mamba enters the hut through an hole, coils itself around the girl, but she does not show any fear. They marry and have a child. Some time later, the girl, now Mamba's wife, wants to visit her family with their child, to which Mamba agrees. When the girl arrives with the child at her hometown, the younger sister has an idea to follow the same path as the other, except she does not help the strangers on the way and is not aware of the serpentine nature of Mamba. The younger sister comes to Mamba's hut and wait for him. When she sees the snake, she is struck with fear and runs away back home. Mamba, in snake form, runs after her. When he arrives, he is beaten to death and burned by the people. The first wife takes Mamba's ashes, opens a hole in her hut and places them inside. She closes the hole. Over the next days, cracks begins to appear on the hole as her husband emerges from the earth as a human, no longer a snake. Mamba of Maquba leaves with his wife and child.

=== Other versions ===
Marianne Brindely summarizes another version of the tale wherein the younger sister departs first to marry Mamba kaMaquba. She meets an old woman on the way who asks the girl to lick her secretions. She refuses and goes ahead, finding a man carrying a pitcher with difficulty. She also refuses to help him and goes directly into Mamba kaMaquba's hut, unaware he is now a serpent. The older sister, on the other hand, helps both people on the way and receives advice on how to approach the serpent Mamba kaMaquba.

In a version published by C. T. Misimang, a girl named Thokozile wants to marry Mamba of Maquba. She meets an old lady on the way who asks her to lick the secretions of her eyes. She does and is told that Mamba is a chief in the form of an animal. The old lady instructs her to go to Mamba's people and to follow their advice to the letter, and to enter Mamba's hut and lie still, even after hearing his whistles and rumbling as he comes into the hut; as soon as he enters, she should get a knife and cut him up. The girl meets the woman carrying a load on her buttocks whom she helps, and finally arrive at Mamba's village. She is instructed to grind boiled sorghum for Mamba's amasi (curdled milk). Soon after, they direct her to the hut to wait for Mamba, who coils itself around her. They marry. Thokozile's sister, after hearing of her successful marriage, decides to follow the same trail, but without helping the strangers on the way, and, after arriving at Mamba's hut and doing (poorly) the same chores, is frightened at the sight of the snake. For her troubles, Mamba's snake form begins to slash the girl with his tail all the way to her home, and departs back to his hut. One day, after giving birth to a daughter, Thokozile decides to visit her parents, but is apprehensive with the snake husband. As he coils around her, she remembers the old lady's advice: she gets a bush knife and cuts the serpent into pieces. The pieces turn into "a handsome young man": Thokozile has broken the curse that made Mamba of Maquba, originally a man, into a snake being.

== Analysis ==
=== Tale type ===
Researchers Denise Godwin and H. C. Groenewald classified the tales of Mamba kaMaquba in the Aarne-Thompson-Uther Index as type ATU 425A, "Monster (Animal) as Bridegroom".

Africanist Sigrid Schmidt, on the other hand, associated these tales to type 443B, King Lindworm.

=== Motifs ===
==== The heroine ====
Harold Scheub interpreted the tales of Kholekile and Lydia umkaSethemba as stories of maturation, the female character going from girl to womanhood.

Godwin and Groenewald saw the tales collected by Nyembezi and Msimang as "heroine-centred" stories, focused on the girl and her quest for marriage.

==== The two sisters ====
Other approaches contrast the behaviour of both female characters: an elder sister who respects the crippled elder at the middle of the journey, and a younger one who maltreats them, with different outcomes for each of the sisters. In the same vein, Marianne Brindley states that informants of the tale focus on the need to listen to the old woman's advice to be fortunate.

Godwin and Groenewald mentioned the parallel of the "kind and unkind girls" to European stories of the type: in African stories, the calabash is the instrument to draw water, while in the European versions, it is a bucket.

==== The serpent husband ====
The character of Umamba has been compared to The Frog Prince of the titular German fairy tale by American professor George Lyman Kittredge: both characters are princes enchanted into animal form (snake or toad), and are only released from their curse by the hand of the woman who accepted to marry them. The name "Mamba" also seems to recall the venomous mamba snake.

Author Edwin Sidney Hartland compared Umamba's tale to one of the Karen people where a tree lizard marries a king's seventh daughter and she conspires with her mother to burn his lizard skin.

The story has also been compared to similar international tales about a marriage between a supernatural creature and a human maiden who disenchants him (namely, Cupid and Psyche and Beauty and the Beast).

==== The serpent's name ====
Rev. O. Stavem translated the name as "The Umamba (a kind of snake) of Maqula". Africanist Harold Scheub gave his name as "Mamba of the Pools".

Godwin and Groenewald interpret the name Maquba as "the dustblower", also the name of the Zulu month when strong winds blow.

== See also ==
- Monyohe (Sotho)
- Animal as Bridegroom
