= Monyohe (Sotho) =

Monyohe is a character that appears in folktales from the Sotho people. He sometimes is depicted as a serpentine or snake being with invisible powers that marries a human woman.

== Selected tales ==
The following tales were collected by Édouard Jacouttet originally in French and translated into English.

=== Monyohe (1st version) ===
In the first tale, Senképeng, sister of chief Masilo, does not want to marry. They go to a singing party at Morakapula, and sing the whole day. Morakapula calls for rain, saying that Senképeng refused to dance with him. So it rains the whole night. The next day, Morakapula forbids everyone to give lodge to the girl. So she and her brother decide to return home, despite the rivers being full. Masilo and his people cross the river without problems, but some kind of force pushes Senképeng back and she cannot cross it. They try several more times, to no avail. She and her brother part ways, and she soldiers on, next to the baks of the Motikoe river. She finds a "heap of asparagus" the river carried and enters it, leaving her thomo (kind of instrument) nearby. One morning, a woman named 'Mamonyohe approaches a fountain and sees the heap. She finds Senképeng and rejoices that she found a wife for her son.

She takes Senképeng to her hut 'Mamonyohe sees that oxen and sheep have been slaughtered, strong beer has been brewed and bread has been baked, and instructs Senképeng to carry a basket of each to Monyohe's hut, who is to be her husband. 'Mamonyohe orders her to return and fetch the utensils. After entering the hut and seeing only the bones from the meat, Senképeng wonders who is the invisible figure that eats the food in an instant. The woman orders the girl to grind some corn and take it to her husband, along with some bread and thick milk. Again, Senképeng questions herself about the incident.

'Mamonyohe directs her to sleep at her husband's hut. On the first night, the girl sleeps on the ground and cannot see anything, but feels Monyohe's tail strike her. She wakes up and resumes yesterday's routine. One day, some people of the village questions her why she does not leave the place and go home, and she answers she does not know how. But one day, the girl goes to the fountain, puts down the jug and goes on a long journey home.

Meanwhile, back at Monyohe's hut, he comes out of it hot in pursuit of his wife. Senképeng sings a song or a kind of spell to stop Monyohe in his tracks as she continues her way back to her village. Sighting two boys herding her village's cattle, she begs them to alert the people about the pursuing serpent. As soon as Monyohe arrives, tired due to the pursuit, the village kills him with knives and razors. 'Mamonyohe comes soon after and laments the death of her son. Then, she orders for a black ox to be killed. She wraps her son's remains in its hide and burns it to a black cinder. She takes the ox's kaross, goes to "the pool" and throws it into the pool. She circles the pool a few times, and Monyohe comes out of it no longer a serpent, but as a man. Senképeng marries the now human Monyohe.

In a variation of the tale, published by Jan Knappert, the introductory part is skipped altogether. Instead, Senképeng and her brother Masilo try to cross a river by swimming, but the strong currents keep both siblings apart, each on a river bank.

=== Monyohe (2nd version) ===
In a second version, Monyohe is described as a serpent, to whom his mother has procured a wife. She finds one maiden and takes her back to his hut. Monyohe's mother orders the girl to take some food to her husband's hut and to fetch the utensils. One day, 'Mamonyohe (Monyohe's mother) instructs her to light a fire, but not to make any smoke (because her son lives under the roof), instead to use some fat inside the hut. After a month, the girl disobeys and lights a fire, generating smoke. Monyohe comes down from the roof and strikes the girl with his tail. The girl then escapes back to her village.

Monyohe follows her, hot in pursuit. She approaches her village and sees two herd boys, who tell the men to ready their knives. Monyohe arrives and hides in a dog's kennel. His mother comes soon after and cries that his son might die. She summons her daughter-in-law (also named Senképeng in this version), who points her to the dog's kennel. Monyohe's mother orders a black ox to the slain and flayed. She gather some firewood and gives some beer to her serpentine son. Now drunken, his mother tosses him into the fire and reduces to ashes, which she gathers and puts into the ox's hide. Monyohe's mother takes hide and puts it in a hut with a pot turned upside down on top of it. One day, she tells Senképeng to watch over the pot, which must uncover by itself.

Senképeng warns 'Mamonyohe about the pot uncovering itself. The woman returns to the hut with some fat, ochre, antimony and mica to smear on the pot. She finds a young man "just like one out of the circumcision". She presents the now human Monyohe to Senképeng as her husband, and they form a family. Senképeng gives birth to a child. Her husband, now in human form, orders his child not to be weaned, but her mother-in-law tells her the opposite. After returning from herding, he orders his wife to suckle their child, but Senképeng tells him of his mother's instructions. He strikes Senképeng, who runs away, back to her village. Monyohe goes to his parents-in-law's house to get Senképeng. They consent, and send a retinue of armed men to follow them. Once they go to the open field, the men kill Monyohe and, when his mother comes to fetch him, they kill her as well.

=== Maliane ===
This tale may also be called Maliane and the Water Snake. Maliane is the daughter of a chief. She has a dog who helps her. She becomes a whirlwind and flies to a bed of reeds. Her dog warns her to be polite to a talking rat. The rat asks her to come with it. Maliane meets an old woman "full of the itch", who asks the girl to lick her wounds. The old woman becomes clean and gives a potion for Maliane to vomit. She also scarifies the girl's heart, "to make her heart strong" as she goes on her way to meet Monyohe.

Maliane goes on and meets Seroalakajana, who asks the girl to help her carry a pot of water. Maliane accompanies Seroalakajana, who tells the girl she must not eat the first loaf of bread, nor to eat from the first pot they will offer Maliane. Both women arrive at a reed enclosure; Maliane breaks a reed and Seroalakajan announces her to someone inside. Maliane is ordered to grind some kaffir corn, to fetch some water and prepare the meal.

Once everything is finished, great portions of food are set inside the hut, and Maliane asks who it is for. They answer it is for her husband, and close the door. Inside the hut, Maliane hears many whistlings: it is Monyohe - as a serpent - come down to eat the food. After the meal, he coils under the blanket and rests its head on Maliane's chest.

'Mamonyohe comes the next morning to see if everything went well. Monyone come down from the roof and Maliane sees it, but he tells her not to be afraid. She decides to visit her family, and her husband gives her a new cloak, a new petticoat and new bracelets, and arrived home safely. Maliane's younger sister, upon seeing her, decides to go through the same trail as her sister. She meets the rat, but pays no heed; she meets the old woman with an itch and even Seroalakajana, but does not help any of them.

She finally arrives at Monyohe's village. Once there, she does the exact opposite as her sister did. She enters Monyohe's hut. The snake sees her lighting a fire and becomes angry; he hits her and throws her down on some pots. As the sun rises, the girl escapes back to her village, the snake behind her. The village fountain dies up, and someone finds the "doctor" who put Monyohe in a snake's skin. The doctor kills a black ox before the fountain, makes a ritual with fat and coal, and releases Monyohe from the snakeskin. Maliane's younger sister, with swollen skin all over her body, is also rescued by the doctor, who spits on her skin and removes it. Now the water flows again and Monyone takes both wives back to his village.

In a variation of this story, Maliane does not have a younger sister. Instead, she escapes from Monyohe with her dog back to her parents' hut. The snake creature follows them and lodges himself in the village's fountain. The ritual by the witch doctor still happens.

=== Monyohe (3rd version) ===
In a third version of the Monyohe story, the story begins with a chief's son, Masilo, leading a hunting party to find any water source to quench his village's dearth of water. The dogs of the expedition run ahead and find a "big pool of dark green water". When the men try to drink it, the water dries up in their hands. The chief of the waters appears. Masilo tries to strike a deal: he will offer a hundred wives, but the other refuses; then Masilo offers his sister Senkepeng, and he accepts. The chief tells him he will recognize his approach in a cloud of red dust, and Masilo warns him not to tell his father of this exchange.

Two years pass, and a serpentine shape begins to appear in a cloud of red dust over the horizon, fast approaching Masilo's village. The serpent enters the village and goes to the chief's court, to the horror of Masilo and the hunting troop. The serpent then slithers to the reed enclosure and hut where the girl sleep, to wait for his wife. The maidens see the animal and escape, but Senkepeng steps outside the hut and the serpent intercepts her. She runs through the village to her paternal uncle's hut, the serpent hot in pursuit. She escapes to her maternal uncle's hut, and the serpent follows her, coiling itself in the reed enclosure around the hut.

Her uncle asks some villagers to bring ten strong bulls and to put them into the kraal. He convinces the serpent to enter the kraal and to choose one of the ten bulls. The oxen feel frightened at the sight of the serpent and begin to trample it out of fear, killing it. Her father, seeing Senkepeng's sorry state, asks who was the one responsible for incident; he learns it was Masilo. He orders his son to be seized and killed.

== Analysis ==
=== Tale type ===
The tales about Monyohe may be considered to be related to the universe of tales classified in the Aarne-Thompson-Uther Index as ATU 425A, "The Animal as Bridegroom", and ATU 425C, "Beauty and the Beast". These tales refer to a human maiden betrothed to a prince in animal form and disenchanting him.

Professor John M. Vlach classified the tale Maliane and the Water Snake, published in Minnie Postma's (af) compilation, as tale type AaTh 425A. Flemish author Marita de Sterck (nl) also recognizes the story of the Water Snake as type AT 425A, "The Animal as Bridegroom".

Africanist Sigrid Schmidt, on the other hand, associated these tales to type 443B, King Lindworm, a tale type she stated was "particularly widespread" in Southern parts of Africa.

=== Motifs ===
Flemish author Marita de Sterck suggests that the story of "Maliane" underlies a theme of maturation for the female character, from girlhood to adulthood (womanhood).

==== The snake husband ====
Researcher Colin Murray noted a relation between the character of the snake - "usually named Monyohe" in these folktales -, fertility, water courses and women's procreative power, since it is by marrying his chosen bride that he returns access to water sources to the people. Likewise, Francis C. L. Rakotsoane described that Monyohe fulfills the role of a water snake (Noha ea Metsi) "who gives water in times of drought" in Basotho mythology.

Africanist Sigrid Schmidt cited the tale in the context of similar African stories about a maiden's marriage to a deity of waters (often snake-shaped) in order to ensure rain for the community. A similar assessment, made by researcher Rachel King, reports that in Basotho myths, the water snake (called noha ea metsi) lives in bodies of water and is also connected to rainmaking traditions.

=== Variants ===
According to scholar Behr-Glinka, the plot of a human woman marrying a snake-like being is "very common in Subsaharan Africa". (Note: One example is The Serpent's Bride, a tale from the Shangani people, wherein a human princess marries the serpentine "King of Waters" in order to open access to water streams to the people and disenchants him.) Sigrid Schmidt reached a similar conclusion: she stated that in Southeast Africa, "numerous variants" exist in the repertoire of the Sotho, Xhosa and the Zulu peoples. This snake being is often ambivalent: a terrible devourer of men, but also a wished-for husband.

Jacottet, the tales' collector, also noted that all three tales seemed to be variants of the same story about a snake creature marrying a woman. This theme, according to him, seemed "a popular subject in South African folklore", with variants appearing in Xhosa and Zulu folklore. L. Marillier, in an 1896 review of Jacottet's French language publication, had also noted that the story of Monyohe was a variation of plots about the marriage between a woman and a serpent.

Professor Minnie Postma also collected and published another tale, titled Monyohe, the Great Snake of the Deep Waters. (Note: Vlach also classified the tale as type AT 425A.) The tale focuses on the origins of Monyohe: his barren mother (a nyopa) and his father, a "big chief", consult with a witch doctor, who tells them she will bear a child - not human, but with the skin of a water serpent. Their son is born, just as predicted. He sleeps "in the darkness of their hut", under the roof, and their parents never light a fire inside, for fear of the smoke blinding him. He sleeps in a hut next to his parents', and is schools in secret, away from the other village boys. When it is time to find a wife, Monyohe decides to search on his own: he crawls next to a pool where the daughters of the other chiefs bathe, and lies in wait. One girl catches his attention: Senkepeng. He introduces himself to the girl, who mocks him and goes away with her sisters. Feeling dejected, he plan a revenge on her: he "takes all the water with him" back to his father's hut, leaving not a drop in miles. Senkepeng's father call his son, Masilo, for an emergency meeting: Masilo should travel far to find potable body of water. He does, but Monyohe appears and reveals the drought and thirst are his sister's fault. They strike a deal: Masilo shall deliver his sister as bride to the snake, and Monyohe shall release the waters, but the snake tells him he will come to her village to fetch her, clad in a cloak of red dust. This tale also contains the pursuit of the bride, and the snake is disenchanted when some people plant knives on the ground to delay the pursuit, and, as his snake skin was cut from head to tail by the sharp blades, he becomes a man.

Professor Thomas Lesaoana Manyeli reported another Basotho tale, the myth of twin sisters Tlhaku-e-khubelu and Tlhaku-e-tala, on their way to their future husband Monyohe. Tlhaku-e-khubelu follows the instructions on the path: she licks a frog from its warts and the frog warns her to cross the rivers of blood, of worms and a dirty stream, then not to laugh at calves and sheep leaping about, and enter her husband's house on the left. She then marries the unseen Monyohe, bearing him a son. Her sister, Tlhaku-e-tala, makes the same path, but mistreats the frog and it does not give her any advice, so Tlhaku-e-tala has to cross the river of blood, soiling her clothes, and the river of worms (with worms falling on her hair); she also laughs at the sheep and calves playtime, and enters the hut through the wrong entry, stepping on Monyohe's tail. For this, Monyohe slaps her with its tail and sends her back to her family. Back to Tlhaku-e-khubelu, she traps her husband with blades which tear apart the snakeskin, turning him into a handsome chief.

== See also ==
- Umamba (Zulu folktale)
- Animal as Bridegroom
