= Ame no Wakahiko =

- God of grains
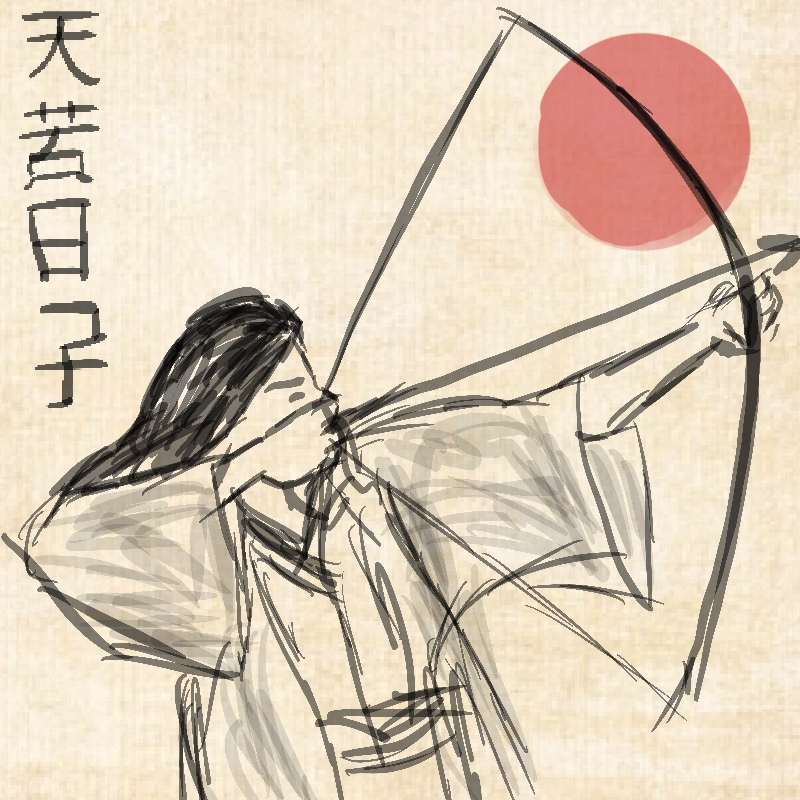

Genealogy
- Parents: Amatsukunitama (father)
- Spouse: Shitateruhime (wife)

Ame no Wakahiko (天稚彦 or 天若日子) is a god of grains and an Amatsukami in Japanese mythology. He is the son of Amatsukunitama. The Ame no Wakahiko Monogatari, one of the Otogi-zōshi, is a monogatari about him.

== Name ==
The name Ame no Wakahiko means "a young boy in heaven," and he is thought to be an exceptionally handsome youth.

== Mythology ==
=== Sent to earth ===
In many versions, when Ame no Hohi did not send word for three years, all the gods gathered up, and Ame no Wakahiko was the one who was chosen to rule the earth. In many versions Ame no Wakahiko was given a bow.

In some versions, however, Ame no Wakahiko is the son of Ame no Hohi and Ame no Wakahiko was sent to earth to look for him.

=== Death ===
In some versions, Ame no Wakahiko fell in love with Shitateruhime. Eight years later, after receiving no report back, the gods sent a bird named Nakime down to earth to check in on him. Following the advice of a wise woman, Ame no Wakahiko used his bow to shoot the bird. The bird was killed but the arrow flew all the way to heaven.

Takamimusubi saw the arrow and threw it back at the earth where it hit Ame no Wakahiko while he was lying in bed, killing him. Other versions state that Amaterasu was the one who shot the arrow back at him.

This myth is the origin of a Japanese saying about the returning arrow. It is likely also a mythicisation of attempts made by the Yamato state to impose its authority over neighbouring states.

=== Funeral ===
After Ame no Wakahiko's death, his parents built a hut (喪屋 moya) for their son. Ajisukitakahikone went down to pay his respect. However, due to Ajisukitakahikone looking similar to Ame no Wakahiko he was mistaken to be Ame no Wakahiko brought back to life. Ajisukitakahikone was offended by this and destroyed the hut and kicked it. The hut landed in the land of Mino and became a mountain called Moyama.

=== Other tales ===
Another story of Ame no Wakahiko appears in Japanese medieval literature of the Muromachi period (Otogi-zōshi), in a narrative very similar to the Aarne-Thompson-Uther tale type ATU 425, "The Search for the Lost Husband", or to the Graeco-Roman story of Cupid and Psyche, by writer Apuleius. The story is alternatively known as Ame no Wakahiko sōshi or Ame no Wakahiko monogatari (The Tale of Ame no Wakahiko), and serves as another etiological tale for the Tanabata festival. According to professor Masako Sato, the calligraphy of the text indicates that its author is Emperor Gohanazono, while French curator Jeannine Auboyer dated the manuscript to ca. 1450.

In this tale, Prince Ame no Wakahiko takes the form of a serpent. One day, he delivers a letter to the maidservant of a wealthy man. The maidservant gives the letter to her master, who opens it: within, a command for the man to surrender his three daughters to the serpent in marriage, else it will kill his entire family. The man's two elder daughters refuse to marry the animal, but the youngest decides to be married to the snake.

The letter also instructed the man to build a palace near a pond, which is to serve as the couple's residence after their marriage. Soon, the human woman is delivered to the palace to await for her snake husband. An enormous serpent emerges from the pond and talks to its bride, assuaging her fears and asking for her to cut off his head. The human bride does as intended "with the blade of a fingernail clipper", and a handsome man comes out of the snakeskin. The man hides the snakeskin in a Chinese box and they enjoy their marital life. He later reveals he is a heavenly deity named Dragon Prince (or Dragon King - a kairyūō), and that he must travel somewhere, and asks her to wait for his return. He also begs his wife not to open the chest, lest she will never see him again. His wife asks him what can she do to find his way to him, and he answers that she must seek a woman in Kyoto and buy a gourd.

After some time, the wife is visited by her sisters, who discover that their brother-in-law, the snake, is in fact a handsome man. Spurred by envy, they convince their youngest sister to open the Chinese box. Only smoke comes out of the box, and later she learns he cannot return to her. She must, then, seek him out.

She goes to Kyoto, buys a gourd and uses its vines to reach the heavenly realm. Now on Heaven, the girl asks directions from a man in hunting robes (the Evening Star), then from a man with a broom (the Comet), and finally from a cluster of people (the Pleiades), who cannot seem to know him. The girl then finds a person on a palanquin, who directs her to a jeweled mansion built on azure stone. At last, the girl enters the mansion and finds her heavenly husband, but he changes her into objects (an armrest, then a fan or a pillow) to hide her from his father, an oni. Eventually, the oni father-in-law discovers her and sets four tasks on his son's human wife: to herd a thousand cattle in one day and one night, to transport one million grains of rice from one granary to another, to stay in a warehouse full of centipedes, and in a warehouse full of snakes. She accomplishes all four tasks with her husband's assistance, since he gave her a magical sleeve. At the end of this tale, the oni father lets his son and the wife meet once a month, but she mistakes it for "once a year" and thus, the lovers can only reunite during the Tanabata.

== Shrines of worship ==
Ame no Wakahiko is enshrined at Abiko Shrine in Aishō, Shiga and Iwakura Shrine in Shinshiro, Aichi.

== See also ==
- Ame no Wakahiko Monogatari
- Kuni-yuzuri
