= Sabzqaba (Iranian folktale) =

Iranian folktale about a snake bridegroom

Folk tale
- Name: Sabzqaba
- Aarne–Thompson grouping: ATU 425B, "Son of the Witch"
- Region: Southern Iran
- Published in: The Fairy Tales and Beliefs of Southern Iran's Region by Moniro Ravanipour
- Related: Cupid and Psyche; Grünkappe; The Snake-Prince Sleepy-Head; Yasmin and the Serpent Prince

Sabzqaba (Persian: "سبزقبا") is an Iranian fairy tale, published by author Moniro Ravanipour, about a maiden that marries the spirit in a tree, loses him, and finds him at his mother's house, where she is forced to perform tasks for her mother-in-law.

The tale is related to the international cycle of the Animal as Bridegroom or The Search for the Lost Husband, in that a heroine marries a supernatural husband in animal shape, loses him, and has to seek him out. It is also classified in the international Aarne-Thompson-Uther Index as tale type 425B, "Son of the Witch", thus distantly related to the Graeco-Roman myth of Cupid and Psyche.

== Summary ==
In this tale, a couple has no children. One day, the wife goes to the spring to fetch water and sees a tree with a green trunk, which she promises to deliver her daughter to if one is born to her. So it happens, and the woman forgets her promise. One day, when the girl is playing with other children, the girl hears a voice coming from the tree, which tells the girl to remind her mother of the promise. The girl goes home and tells her mother about the voice in the tree. The woman, remembering her vow, prepares her daughter and takes her to the green trunk, despite the girl's pleas. The girl is left near the green trunk, in tears, when, suddenly, the trunk opens up, revealing an emerald palace inside it, and a youth comes out of it. He introduces himself as her husband and makes her promise not to tell anyone about this secret. Life goes on for her: during the day, she sits by the tree trunk, and at night, it opens up for her.

She is asked about it by her friends, even her mother, who, one day, begins to cry for her daughter's fate. Moved by her mother's tears, the girl reveals her husband's secret, then goes to the tree trunk to wait for her husband. Realizing he will not appear, she remembers his words: if she told anyone about him, she would have to search for him for seven years in iron garments and iron shoes. She begins her quest and walks over seven mountains, until she wears down the seventh pair of shoes near a spring, and she stops to rest for a moment. She then sees a woman fetching water, and discovers that she is her husband's, Sabzqaba, servant. The girl secretly drops her ring in the woman's jar, which she brings to Sabzqaba. The youth recognizes the ring and brings his wife inside, but warns her his family is made of demons and will devour her, so he turns her into a pin and places it around his neck. Despite his magic, his demoness mother still senses a human nearby. Sabzqaba changes his wife back into a human, and introduces her as a servant he found for them.

Still playing with her husband's charade, the girl is forced to fulfill tasks for the demoness: first, she is to separate a mixed heap of grains (peas, beans and rice) in the barn, which her husband helps her do; next, she is to empty a pond with her eyelashes. Over the impossibility of this task, she sits down and weeps, but Sabzqaba appears to her and chants a spell: water comes out of the pond and waters the yard. Thirdly, the demoness orders the girl to take a box ("جعبه", in the original) to the demoness's sister and trade for a thing, and warns her the box is not to be opened. On the way there, the girl opens the box; dancers ("رقاص") leap out of it, begin playing the tar ("تار") and the tombak ("تنبک") drum and start to dance. Sabzqaba appears to his wife and commands the dancers back into the box, then advises the girl how to proceed: open a closed door and close an open one; exchange the fodder for animals (grass for a horse, bone for a dog); enter his aunt's house and compliment a pool of pus and blood, give her the box and flee. It happens so: the girl escapes back to the demoness's house, despite the aunt commanding the pool, the animals and the doors to stop her.

Finally, Sabzqaba's mother betroths him to her niece. During the wedding night, Sabzqaba changes his wife into a broom and places her in a corner, and secretly stashes a pack of needles and pins and a water bottle, and saddles two horses. After he marries, he kills his cousin and places her head in a chest, changes his human wife back to human shape and both flee from his demon relatives. The next morning, the demonesses discover the cousin's head and go after the couple on their horses with a demon retinue. Sabzqaba and his wife throw behind them the needles and pins (that become a field of them), a grain of salt (that becomes a lake) and finally the water in the bottle (which creates a sea between them). With each passing obstacle, the number of demons decreases, until they reach the sea and some of them drown, making them cease their chase. At a safe distance, Sabzqaba creates a palace for him and his wife, and brings his mother-in-law to live with them.

== Analysis ==
=== Tale type ===
The tale is classified, according to the international Aarne-Thompson Index as type ATU 425, "The Search for the Lost Husband". More specifically, it is classified as subtype ATU 425B, "Son of the Witch". This tale type involves the heroine being forced to perform tasks for a witch or her mother-in-law, but she is secretly helped by her husband or love interest.

=== Motifs ===
According to Swedish scholar Jan-Öjvind Swahn's study on Animal as Bridegroom tales, a characteristic motif that occurs in the "Indo-Persian" area is the heroine using a ring to signal her arrival to her husband, when she finds his location.

==== The heroine's tasks ====
One of the heroine's tasks is to sort out a heap of mixed grains. According to Swedish scholar Jan-Öjvind Swahn, this motif appears in Mediterranean and Near Eastern variants of type ATU 425B, "The Witch's Tasks".

Another motif that appears in the tale type is that the heroine must travel to another witch's house and fetch from there a box or casket she must not open. German folklorist Hans-Jörg Uther remarked that these motives ("the quest for the casket" and the visit to the second witch) are "the essential feature" of the subtype.

==== The heroes' magic flight ====
The heroine and her supernatural husband escape in a Magic Flight sequence, that is, the characters either throw magic objects to delay their pursuers, or change into other forms to deceive them. Although this episode is more characteristic of tale type ATU 313, "The Magic Flight", some variants of type ATU 425B also show it as a closing episode. German literary critic Walter Puchner argues that the motif attached itself to type 425B, as a Wandermotiv ("Wandering motif").

According to Marzolph's index, Iranian type 425B concludes with the episode the "Magic Flight": by throwing objects behind them, the heroes create magic obstacles, e.g., a pack of needles becomes a field of needles, salt creates a plain of salt, and the water creates a sea or a river.

==== The tree husband ====
Among the forms of the supernatural husband of tale type ATU 425, the heroine may marry a tree.

== Variants ==
=== Bibinegar and Maysaskabar ===
In an Iranian tale published by professor Mahomed-Nuri Osmanovich Osmanov with the title "Бибинегар и Майсаскабар" ("Bibinegar and Maysaskabar"; Persian: "بی بی نگار و می‌سس قبار", "Bibi Nagar and Mises Qabar"), a childless woman promises her unborn child to a tree stump. A girl is born and given the name Bibinegar. A voice emerges from the tree stump to remind her mother to give what it is owed. Bibinegar cries but decides to sit beside the tree stump. A man comes out of it with a grand retinue, introduces himself as Maysaskabar and gives the girl a coat. He tells her that she can never part with the coat, lest he will disappear. Bibinegar's aunt burns the coat in order to get rid of him and to marry the girl to her son. The man disappears, his only memento a turquoise ring. Bibinegar decides to seek him out, and passes by a flock of sheep, a caravan of camels and a herd of cows - all presents from Maysaskabar to Bibinegar. She reaches a fountain where a boy is getting water. She begs for a drink and the boy refuses, and she curses the water the boy is carrying to become pus and blood. The boy returns to fetch water again and she drops his ring inside it. Maysaskabar notices the ring and gets the maiden to a house of divs. He convinces the divs to take her as a servant. He plans to escape with her that night after he kills the wife he was forced to marry. They escape in a "Magic Flight" sequence as the man's mother pursues them. She is killed, but lets a drop of blood drip on the ground and become a gazelle. Maysaskabar decides to take the gazelle as a pet, but once he is away the animal attacks Bibinegar. One night, the gazelle becomes human, hides everyone in bottles and prepares a cauldron of boiling water to drop Bibinagar in. Bibinegar tricks the woman and goes to the roof to pray, to buy herself some time, and a fairy appears. The fairy tells the girl to break the bottle Maysaskabar is in. She does and he is released. The man tosses the gazelle into the cauldron, reveals it is all a setup by his aunt and sends Bibinegar with a bottle with his aunt's life inside to his aunt. He advises her to feed the dog and the camel with the correct food, water the garden, clean the rug and the bed, and to delouse his aunt when she asks for it. She follows through with the instructions, slams the aunt's head against the floor and runs away. The dog attacks Maysaskabar's aunt. Bibinegar returns to her beloved, now human. In his Catalogue of Persian Folktales, German scholar Ulrich Marzolph classified the tale as his type AaTh 425B, Der Tierbräutigam: Die böse Zauberin ("The Animal Bridegroom: The Evil Sorceress"), and sourced it from Kermān.

=== Suz Al-Hawa Beidar Qaba ===
In an Iranian tale titled "متیل سوز الهوا بی‌در قبا" or "سوزالهوا بی در قبا" ("Suz Al-Hawa Beidar Qaba"), an old woman has no children, and goes to a tree to pray for one, making a deal with it: if a boy, he will be its servant; if a girl, its bride. Some time later, a girl is born to the old woman. When she is old enough, she passes by the tree and a voice tells her to remind her mother of her promise, which is overheard by a passing shepherd. The shepherd tells the girl's mother about it, and she decides to fulfill her deal by delivering her daughter to the tree. After the old woman leaves, a handsome man appears out of the tree, and explains he is Suz Al-Hawa Beidar Qaba, a man with holy powers who has come from a family of "infidels". The girl and the man of the tree live together, but he warns her that she is not to tell anything to anyone, not even her mother, for she will have to search for him wearing fifty pairs of iron shoes in order to find him again. Eventually, the girl accidentally reveals the truth to her mother, causing Suz Al-Hawa Beidar Qaba to disappear. Following his instructions, the girl begins a long quest towards him, by wearing down fifty pairs of iron shoes, until she finds him again with his infidel family. They meet again, and she follows his instructions in order to survive his family's attempts against her.

=== The Girl and the Konar Tree ===
The story is said to be common in the Evaz region of Fars. The story of "The Girl and the Tree" has been compared to the Graeco-Roman myth of Cupid and Psyche, in regards to their common structure: marriage to supernatural husband, breaking of a taboo, search for lost spouse, reunion. Similarities have also been noted between Venus's tasks for Psyche in the myth and Shah Nil's mother's for the human girl in the Persian tales.

==== First version ====
In one version of the tale, translated to English as The Girl and the Konar Tree, a woman longs to have a child and goes to the river margin. There, she finds a Konar tree (the Ziziphus spina-christi), to which she promises her daughter in marriage if one is born to her. Thus, one is born to her. One day, when she is older, the woman's daughter goes to draw water by the river, when the tree tells the girl to remind her mother of her vow. The girl's mother dresses her appropriately and leaves her by the tree. By nightfall, the tree trunk opens and a voice bids her enter. The girl enters the tree and meets a handsome youth named Shah Neil ("شاه ‌نیل‌از", in the original), who says he is from the family of "Galzangis", humanoid man-eating creatures, and asks her not to tell anything about him to anyone, lest he disappears. The girl then falls into a routine: by night, she enters the tree to spend time with the youth, and by day, she waits by the tree, which earns the people's mockery. Some time later, there is a wedding celebration in the city, and the girl attends. She also knows that Shah Nil is there incognito at the celebration, and she is not to reveal his presence to anyone. At the wedding party, the girl is endlessly mocked for her relation to a tree, when she tells them about the youth in the tree. Shah Neil says that she will never find him again, and departs. The girl decides to go after him. She passes by flocks of sheep and herds of camel, which she learns from their herders belong to Shah Neil. The girl finally reaches a stream and sees a servant drawing water in a jug. She asks for some water to drink, but the servant says the water is for Shah Nil, and she will be punished if he learns someone drank from his jug. The girl insists to be given water and drops a golden ring inside it. The servant takes the jug to Shah Nil, who recognizes the ring when it washes on his hands. Shah Neil leaves the house and finds his wife outside, warning her his Galazangi family will want to devour her. He takes her in and tries to hide her, but his Galazangi mother discovers her and orders her to bring a rolling pin ("vardane") from the Asharkhane's house - a trap, since the dangers on the way will kill her. Shah Neil intercepts his wife and advises her how to proceed: exchange the fodder between two animals (bone for a dog, and hay for a horse), pass by a pond and tree and say she wishes to pray under a tree, enter the house to fetch the rolling pin and flee. The girl does as instructed and fetches the rolling pin, when the other Galzangi orders her servants to stop the girl, to no avail. The next day, Shah Neil knows his wife will be in danger if she stays at his family's home, and decides to escape with her. They fetch some broken glass, needles and water with them, and flee. The Galzangis learn they escaped and chase after them. Shah Nil and his wife throw behind them the broken glass and the needles to hurt the Galzangi's feet. While their pursuers busy themselves with removing the shards of glass and needles from their injuries, Shah Neil and his wife return to her mother's house.

==== Second version ====
In another tale, a woman finds a tree and vows to give it her daughter if she becomes pregnant. The woman does become pregnant, gives birth to a girl and forgets her vow. One day, when the girl is old enough, she goes to fetch water near the tree and a voice comes from its trunk, telling her to remind her mother of the promise. The girl goes back home and informs her mother, who covers her daughter with a scarf and leaves her by the tree. By nightfall, the tree trunk opens up and a voice bids her enter. Inside the girl meets a youth named Shah Nil, who asks her to spend her days next to the tree, and the nights with him inside the tree, and advises her not to reveal his existence to anyone. Some time later, the girl's mother goads her into revealing the secret encounters, and she mentions Shah Nil. On uttering his name, he vanishes. The girl then decides to go after him by passing through seven marker, until she finds a servant fetching water for Shah Nil. She drops a bead in the water jug, which is brought to Shah Nil. A nightingale brings Shah Nil a message that his wife is there. Shah Nil asks the servant to bring her in and he hides her. Shah Nil's mother, however, senses a human scent nearby and looks for the human to devour him. Shah Nil then introduces the human girl as another servant he brought in to do their chores. Thus, the girl is forced on hard tasks for Shah Nil's mother: first, the creature mixes kilos of grains, mung beans (or "ماش‌", in the original), rice, wheat and others, and orders the girl to separate them, which Shah Nil does for her. Second, Shah Nil's mother gives the girl a sieve and orders her to draw water from the pond. Shah Nil asks the nightingale to cover the holes of the sieve for it to retain water. Lastly, the creature gives the girl a black object which she orders to wash white. Shah Nil asks his nightingale helper to do the task for his human wife. Finally, Shah Nil tires of his mother's plot and decides to escape with his human wife. They take with them a comb, some needles, and a jug of water, and flee. Shah Nil's mother goes in pursuit of them. Seeing his mother is chasing after them, Shah Nil throws behind them the comb and the needles to injure her feet, and drops he water jug to create a sea to cause her wounds to hurt. The objects deter the creature, and Shah Nil returns with his human wife to her city, where they live by the tree.

==== Other tales ====
In a third tale similar to the first narrative, there is a sequence where the supernatural husband transforms his human wife into a vase with flowers to hide her from his man-eating mother.

== See also ==
- Grünkappe
- Yasmin and the Serpent Prince
- The Snake-Prince Sleepy-Head
