= Grünkappe =

Iranian folktale about an animal bridegroom

Grünkappe (English: "Green Cap") is an Iranian folktale collected by Arthur Christensen. The folktale is about a human maiden who marries a youth in horseskin, loses him due to her breaking his trust, and goes after him at his mother's home, where she is forced to perform hard tasks for her.

The tale belongs to the international cycle of the Animal as Bridegroom or The Search for the Lost Husband, wherein a human princess or other maiden marries a supernatural husband, loses him, and goes on a quest to find him. It is also distantly related to the Graeco-Roman myth of Cupid and Psyche, in that the heroine is forced to perform difficult tasks for a witch or her mother-in-law.

== Sources ==
Marzolph sourced the tale from the Fars province. In addition, according to Christensen, the tale was provided by one Frau Munschîzâdeh, a woman who lived in Shiraz.

== Summary ==
In this tale, a fisherman finds a fine foal in his net in the sea. He brings it home and hides it from his seven daughters in a room. He feeds it with candies and gives the leftovers to his daughters. One day, the fisherman leaves the room and takes the candies with him. His daughters take the chance to spy into the room. They enter and see a foal in the corner of the room. The seven sisters fight among themselves to have the horse, thinking it a gift from their father. In the fracas, the horse pulls the youngest, Herzveloren, over to him, despite her protests, and her six sisters leave her in the horse's room. The fisherman returns and sees his youngest daughter in the room with the horse. The horse then asks the man to marry his daughter. The man is doubtful about the proposal: "A horse for a husband? What will people think?". The horse explains that he belongs to the race of the Peri, ran away from there due to a fight, and fell in love with the human girl.

Herzveloren marries him, and is endlessly mocked by her sisters. One day, the horse, named Grünkappe, tells his wife not to cry, for he is a handsome youth beneath the horseskin, since his own mother, who is from the race of the Dîwe, cursed him into that state. He also makes a deal with Herzveloren: he can take off his horseskin at night to become a man, if she can keep the secret between them. One day, she reveals to her sisters that her husband is a man by night and a horse by day, and her sisters, jealous of her good luck, goad her into asking Grünkappe how to burn his horseskin. Herzveloren insists to know the answer, and Grünkappe tells her the horseskin can be burnt in pistachio peels and onion peels. Herzveloren burns his horseskin. Grünkappe warns her that only misfortune awaits them, gives her a ring, and tells her to seek him with seven pairs of iron shoes in the land of Peris and Divs.

After a long journey, she reaches her mother-in-law's house, and, drained by the effort, rests by a spring. A slave comes to fetch water and Herzveloren drops her ring into the slave's jug. Grünkappe is informed about the woman at the spring and goes to check on her; his wife Herzveloren sees him and embraces him, her journey at an end. However, her husband takes her in to his mother and his wife is forced to perform chores for her: to wash a black piece of cloth white and black again. Grünkappe's mother then sends Herzveloren, her true daughter-in-law, to her sister under false pretences: to get a pair of scissors for the upcoming wedding, but she is sending the human to be devoured by the aunt. Herzveloren goes to the Dev's sister to get the scissors. Once there, the Div-aunt goes to another room to sharpen her teeth. The Div-aunt's child, from her cradle, advises Herzveloren to get the scissors and escape, for its mother is preparing to eat the human. Later, Grünkappe is forced to marry his cousin, and his Diwe mother places ten candles on Herzveloren's fingers. The human girl complains to her husband that her fingers are burning, and Grünkappe can only answer her that his heart is also burning.

After the marriage with the Div-cousin, Grünkappe kills and beheads her, and goes to meet his human wife, Herzveloren, and turns into a red horse for them to escape. His personal black slave takes a bridle and escapes with them. The following morning, his Div-family enters the bridal chambers to see the wedding couple, and find the slain Div-bride. They also realize that the man escaped with Herzveloren and the slave, and order the Divs to chase after them. At the end of the tale, the pair escapes from his mother and, as a last trick on her, turn into grains of corn, while the witch becomes a chicken.

== Analysis ==
=== Tale type ===
In his notes, Christensen classified the tale as type AaTh 425, Der Tierbräutigam (Psyche-Märchen) ("The Animal Bridegroom (Psyche's Tale)").

In his Catalogue of Persian Folktales, German scholar Ulrich Marzolph classified the tale as his type AaTh 425B, Der Tierbräutigam: Die böse Zauberin ("The Animal Bridegroom: The Evil Sorceress"). Marzolph's typing corresponds to type ATU 425B, "The Son of the Witch", of the international Aarne-Thompson-Uther Index. Type 425B is considered by scholarship to correspond to the ancient Graeco-Roman myth of Cupid and Psyche, that is, the supernatural husband's mother forces the heroine, her daughter-in-law, to perform difficult and impossible tasks for her.

Scholars Wolfram Eberhard and Pertev Boratav, establishers of the Typen Türkischen Volksmärchen ("Turkish Folktale Catalogue"), in the introduction to their joint work, noted that the tale Grünkappe was parallel to the Turkish tale type TTV 98, "Der Pferdemann" ("Horse-Husband").

=== Motifs ===
Swedish scholar Jan-Öjvind Swahn asserted that the animal or supernatural husband appears as a horse in tale type 425A "in the Orient". (Note: In his monograph about Cupid and Psyche, Jan-Öjvind Swahn acknowledged that Turkish type 98 was his 425A, that is, "Cupid and Psyche", being the "oldest" and containing the episode of the witch's tasks.)

According to Swahn's study on Animal as Bridegroom tales, a characteristic motif that occurs in the "Indo-Persian" area is the heroine using a ring to signal her arrival to her husband, when she finds his location.

== Variants ==
=== Iran ===
Professor Manūchihr Lamʻah (or Manuchehr Lama’e) collected and published a tale from Boyer-Ahmad with the title "متیل سرخر" ("Matil-e Sar-e Xār"; English: "Story of the Donkey's Head"), which Erika Friedl translated as Donkey-Head. In this tale, a woman prays to God for a son, and a boy with donkey's head is born to her and her husband, whom they name Sozalqaba. He grows up and asks his parents to find him a wife, but even his father questions who will want to marry one such as him. He insists to be married to the princess, Bi Delhava. His father goes to the king's court to court her in his son's stead, and the king agrees to their marriage, but only if Sozalqaba can provide sacks of gold and silver as a wedding gift. Sozalqaba provides the monarch with the requested gift with his powers and marries the princess. On the wedding night, in their chambers, Sozalqaba removes the donkeyskin and becomes a handsome youth, warning the princess not to burn his animal disguise, lest they separate and she has to search for him. Time goes on, and the princess is advised by her sisters to burn his donkeyskin. She does; he appears to her, telling her she can only find him if she wears down seven pairs of iron shoes. The princess goes after him. Meanwhile, Sozalqaba has found work with a div named Alazangi as their shepherd. The princess finds him again at the end of her journey, and he has to hide her from his Div-mother, which he does by transforming her into a handkerchief, but his mother still senses a human's smell nearby. Eventually, Sozalqaba shows his Div-mother his human wife, whom he introduces as his sister to ward off suspicions. Some time later, Alazangi forces the girl to separate heaps of grain (wheat and sesame), which Sozalqaba fulfills for her. Next, Alazangi orders the princess to go to his mother and bring back a comb, scissors and a mirror. Sozalqaba intercepts her and advises how to proceed: she is to exchange the fodder between two animals (bone for a dog, chaff for a donkey), roll out an unrolled carpet and roll up the spread rug, open up a closed well and close off an open one. Bi Delhava does as instructed and reaches Alazangi's mother's house. The creature greets her and retires to another room to sharpen its teeth, when a baby in a cradle warns her Alazangi's mother wishes to eat her, so she is to get the comb, mirror and scissors from the cradle and escape. Bi Delhava fetches the objects and rushes back to Alazangi's house, while Alazangi's mother orders the carpets and animals to stop the princess, to no avail.

==== Literary versions ====
Author Shahriar Nafici published a Persian language tale obtained from his mother. In this tale, Sheep's Head, in the town of Make Believe, a childless couple wants a son, but no such luck. A wise man gives the woman a remedy (some halva) which she brings home with her. However, her husband eats the halva, becomes pregnant and, advised, by his wife, gives birth to a baby with a sheep's head. The old man tries to get rid of the sheep by dropping it on the well, but it survives and lives with the couple. Years later, the baby with the sheep's head wants to marry, but his parents ask him who could marry a person with his characteristics. Still, the man goes to propose to the king's daughter on Sheep's Head behalf, and the king asks some suitor's tasks first: to bring one hundred camels loaded with gold, one hundred with silver and a hundred with jewels. The old man informs Sheep's Head of the king's request and the creature sends his father to the well, where he is to ask for a rope. It happens thus, and the man returns home with a single rope, but the camels appear in the morning.

The king is delighted with the wedding gift and offers one of his seven daughters to Sheep's Head, who prefers the youngest, princess Maleknâz, who has been having dreams about a mysterious and handsome prince. Maleknâz is told about her upcoming wedding to the sheep-headed bridegroom and brings a dagger to kill him after the weddin. On the wedding night, Sheep's Head takes off his animal disguise and reveals he is a handsome youth named Malek Mohammad, born to the "king of the angels" and cursed by his mother for refusing to marry her sister's daughter. In regards to their marriage and the breaking of the curse, he explains that princess Maleknâz must bear humiliation and mockery from her sisters until forty days have passed, then Malek Mohammad's curse will be broken and he can assume human form permanently, since his "apparent" human parents failed in keeping him inside their house for the same period of time. Maleknâz bears each day their endless mockery, with her husband's support and life lessons.

After seven days, Maleknâz, bearing the brunt of her sisters' mockery, takes them to her chamber and pull the curtains to let them see her husband's real form when he leaves his sheep head disguise. By doing this, she breaks his trust. Disappointed, Sheep's Head gives her instructions on how to find him: she shall wear pairs of shoes made of "pure metal" (or iron), walk with seven walking sticks, go through seven cities and learn several important lessons, then she may find him. On her way, she finds Malek Rouh, a blacksmith who claims to be Malek Mohammad's father. She finally reaches the palace of her mother-in-law in the town of demons. Malek Mohammad finds her and explains that his mother is a cannibal and a "demon". He turns her into a brooch to hide from his human-eater mother and makes her promise not to eat Maleknâz. Some time later, his mother sends her to empty a flooded area using only a sieve. Her husband helps her with a magic trick. She continues to force impossible tasks on the princess, like counting stones in the desert or emptying a basin with a thimble. One of the last tasks she forces upon the princess is to be naked, cover herself in candles and dance at the upcoming wedding of Malek Mohammad and his cousin. At the wedding, Maleknâz dances while the wax from the candles melts all over her body. A sudden gust of wind blows open the doors and snuffs out the candles to save Maleknâz. A ball of light comes in and takes the princess away from the demons and into the Town of Knowledge. Maleknâz recognizes her saviour: her father-in-law.

=== Kurdish people ===
In a tale from the Kurdish people translated into Persian with the title "سبزعلی، سبزه‌قبا" ("Sabze Ali, Sabze Qaba"), a king has three daughters who have not found husbands, so they send for the slave boy and order him to bring three melons of different ripeness to the king, as analogy to their marriageability. The slave fulfills the orders and brings the king the three melons. The king inquires about their meaning, and his minister of the right hand explains it to him, who also suggests he gathers a crowd for the princesses to choose their husbands from. He follows his minister's advice and assembles a crowd of male suitors, for the princesses to choose their husbands by releasing three birds at random: the eldest princess's bird lands on the son of the minister of right hand, the middle one's on the head of the son of the minister of the left hand, and the youngest on the head of the king's horse. Surprised at this event, the king orders her to release it again, and again it perches on his horse. Angered, the king orders his youngest daughter to be locked with the horse in the stables, and celebrates his elders' weddings. Back to the third princess, she cries over her fate in the stables next to the horse, and the animal begins to talk to her: he explains that his name is Malik Muhammad, the son of the king of the fairies and with a demon for a mother; since he refused to marry his mother's niece, he was cursed to live in the skin of a horse. He also tells the princess to take him to the desert, so he can create a palace for them. It happens so, and their new house is built entirely in gold and silver brick; the horse takes off his skin and lives as human with his wife. Later, the king rides around the desert with a retinue and notices the newly built palace, and asks whose house it belongs to: Malik Muhammad, but the king has never heard of any prince with that name. They enter the palace and meet his daughter, who tells them that her husband is the same horse. Her mother then asks the princess to discover how to destroy the horseskin. The princess goes to Malik Muhammad and asks him; he says that "an enemy" made her ask that, but tells her anyway: burn it with pistachio peels. The princess gathers enough pistachio peels, takes the horsekin and burns it. Malik Muhammad smells the burning, tells his wife to find him after she wears down seven pairs of iron shoes and seven walking canes made of iron, turns into a bird, and flies away. The princess's relatives depart and leave her alone in her palace, crying over the loss of her husband. Then, she wears a dervish's garments, the iron shoes and begins her long walk with iron canes. After wearing down all seven shoes, she reaches a garden and rests by a tree, then sees a human slave fetching water. The human slave tells the princess, in dervish garb, that they are at the city of demons and they will devour her, but the slave is spared because she is Malik Muhammad's personal servant. The princess drops her ring into a jar of water that the servant brings to her master, Malik Muhammad. The man notices the ring and goes to retrieve his wife, but warns her his mother will devour her, and turns her into a needle. Soon after, his demon mother smells a human scent in her house, and Malik Muhammad makes her promise not to eat the princess. The man changes the needle back into the princess, and the demon mother realizes her son went to the city of humans and found himself a human wife ("a child of Adam"). Despite promising not to devour the girl, the demoness starts to force hard tasks for her daughter-in-law: first, to fill seven dry pots with her tears – done by filling them with water and sprinkling salt; next, to sweep the floor with her eyebrows – done by Malik Muhammad, who summons a wind. Some time later, the demoness goes to her sister, another demoness, and plots to send the princess to the latter's house to be devoured. Thus, the demoness gives her a box, which the princess is to take to a castle in a cave behind the mountain and trade it for the "twin circle" (dâyra doqoli). The princess begins to walk to her husband's aunt's house and decides to take a peek inside the box: she opens it and seven moths escape from it. Malik Muhammad appears to her and, uttering an incantation, commands the moths back to the box. He then explains this task is a trap, and advises her how to proceed: she is to compliment a river of pus and blood, open a closed door and close an open one, exchange the fodder of two animals (straw for a horse, bone for a dog), compliment a thorny thicket, give the box to his aunt, take the twin circle and flee as quickly as she can. Finally, the demoness weds Malik Muhammad to his cousin, and forces the princess to hold ten candles on her fingers and to stay at the couple's door for the whole night. During the night, however, Malik Muhammed kills his cousin with a sword, removes the candles from the princess's fingers and, despite admonishing her about her burning his skin, escapes with her. The next day, his mother sends her demons relatives after them, and Malik Muhammed shapeshifts the princess and himself to fool their pursuers: first, into a tree (the princess) and a snake coiled around it (him), then into an old man (him) and a garden (the princess). Failing that, Malik Muhammad and the princess throw behind them objects to deter their pursuers: a pack of needles (that creates a mountain of needles) and a grain of salt (that creates a mountain of salt). The demon pursuers hurt themselves in the needles and the salt, then return empty-handed to the city of demons. Malik Muhammad and the princess go back to their palace and live happily.

=== India ===
Author M. N. Venkataswami collected an Indian variant from Nagpur, Central India, with the title Jambhu Rájá, first published in the Indian Antiquary. In this tale, a king has a dream about a horse – a good omen, he believes. Intent on making it a reality, he goes to the marketplace and buys a spirited horse. He brings it to his stable, but the animal refuses to eat his fodder, except in the presence of the king's daughter. The king consults the dice, and marries her to the horse. At night, the horse, named Jambhu Raja, takes off his horse-covering and becomes a man. His wife notices his transformation and one day burns his horse skin. He passes his days doing good deeds. One day, his wife is visited by her sisters (in disguise), who tell her to ask her husband his name. He warns her not to do so, but she insists. He goes to the margin of a river, tells his name and disappears back to his parents' kingdom, and suffers an intense burning sensation. The princess goes on a quest for him. One day, she rests by a tree, and overhears two chakwi chakwa birds conversing about a cure for Jambhu Raja: get their dung and grind it to powder. Next, she reaches a fountain where water bearers are fetching water and taking it to Jambhu Raja to cool him down. The princess puts her ring into a jug that is taken to the prince, enters the palace and cures her husband. However, his mother forces the princess on dangerous tasks: to plaster with cow dung their dwelling place twice, made difficult for her since it is made to bristle with sharp needles; the second time, by Jambhu Rajá's mother conjuring magic scorpions and centipedes (on both occasions, Jambhu Rajá uses his powers to do away with the dangers); to wash a dirty sari smeared with oil, which is done with the help of the cranes (baglās, in the original); to winnow three khaṇḍis of grain (done with the help of ants); and give a letter to the house of the prince's new bride (with a command to kill the girl). Jambhu Rájá foils his mother's every attempt on his wife. The day comes when his mother prepares his wedding to another wife, and the princess is made into a torch-bearer. She complains to Jambhu Raja that her cloth is on fire. Jambhu Rajá says that not only her clothes are on fire, but his body and mind, then rescues his wife back to their palace. This story was also classified as a Horse-Husband type of tale.

== See also ==
- Yasmin and the Serpent Prince
- The Snake-Prince Sleepy-Head
- Sabzqaba
- The Horse-Devil and the Witch
- The Tale of the Woodcutter and his Daughters
- The Padisah's Youngest Daughter and Her Donkey-Skull Husband
- Sea-Horse (Syrian folktale)
