= The Princess Who Could Not Keep a Secret =

Turkish fairy tale about a snake bridegroom

The Princess Who Could Not Keep a Secret (Turkish: Sır Saklamayan Padişah Kızı) is a Turkish fairy tale published by Turkish folklorist Saim Sakaoğlu, about a princess who marries a youth in snakeskin, loses him due to her breaking his trust, and goes after him at his mother's home, where she is forced to perform hard tasks for her.

The tale belongs to the international cycle of the Animal as Bridegroom or The Search for the Lost Husband, wherein a human princess marries a supernatural husband, loses him, and goes on a quest to find him. It is also distantly related to the Graeco-Roman myth of Cupid and Psyche, in that the heroine is forced to perform difficult tasks for a witch or her mother-in-law.

== Publication ==
The tale was originally collected from an informant named Fazıl Mağa, from the region of Gümüşhane, and published by Turkish folklorist Saim Sakaoğlu. It was translated to German by Adelheid Uzunoğlu-Ocherbauer as Die Prinzessin, die kein Geheimnis für sich behalten konnte ("The Princess who could not Keep a Secret").

== Summary ==
A poor couple have no children, and the old woman asks her husband to bring them a son, even if it is a snake. The old man earns their living by gathering firewood and selling it in the market. One day, the man brings home a bundle of firewood with a snake inside. Thanking God for having a son, the old couple feed and take care of the animal, and wherever the snake sleeps, a gold bar appears. Time passes, and the snake tells his father to go to the Sultan and ask for his eldest daughter in marriage with Mindilhava (the snake's name). The old man goes to the sultan's palace and sits on a stone reserved for suitors. The sultan takes the old man in and agrees with the proposal, but sets as a condition that a certain mountain must be moved next to the castle. Mindilhava fulfills the task; the sultan's eldest daughter is guided to a room, where she waits for her bridegroom: a snake comes into the room, but she returns to her father's palace. The sultan then says she should have waited a bit more. The snake then asks his father to go for the sultan's middle daughter; this time, the sultan orders that the river Tschoruh must flow next to his palace. The snake fulfills the second task; but the middle daughter also rejects her snake bridegroom. Finally, the snake asks for the sultan's youngest daughter, and this time he has to provide seven camels carrying loads of gold. The snake does and the third princess is guided to the room. She accepts the snake as her destiny, and shares the bed with the snake for three nights. On the fourth night, the snake takes off its skin and becomes a handsome youth, so handsome the sultan's daughter passes out.

After six months, her elder sister suggests they invite their sister to see if she is still alive. The princess goes, and her father summons a jirit tournament, to which his snake son-in-law is invited. The snake, in human form, tells his wife he will take part in the festivities, but she must not tell anyone about his true identity. On the first day, he rides a fiery red horse with red clothes; on the second day, a black horse with black clothes; and on the third a white horse on white clothes. The princess's sisters mock her for her snake husband and admire the jirit rider, but on the third day she reveals the secret; a sudden storm rages and her husband disappears. She wears iron shoes and walks with an iron cane. On her journey, she meets a dervish who tells her she will reach a spring at the end of the way, where her husband's sister will come fetch water, and she must drop his ring on the water jug. It happens as the dervish advises: her husband recognizes the ring and goes to the fountain to get his wife. He explains that his mother is a Dev, with breasts fallen over her shoulders, so she should suckle his mother's breasts to avoid being devoured.

His dev-mother believes the princess is just a girl who lost her way, and suggests to her son they should take her a goose-herd. Meanwhile, Mindilhava (the man) has been betrothed to his cousin, and the Dev-mother orders the princess to go to his aunt to fetch instruments for the upcoming wedding. Mindilhava advises his human wife to go there and fetch a sooty box over the stove, and flee as quickly as she can. The princess gets the box, but, on the way, she opens the box and the instruments escape. Mindilhava comes and orders the instruments to return to the box. Next, the Dev-mother orders the princess to fetch bird feathers for a blanket. Mindilhava takes the princess to the top of a mountain and summons all the birds for them to give their feathers. Lastly, during the wedding, the Dev-mother dips the princess's body in wax and places ten candles on her fingers, and takes her to Mindilhava's room. The princess utters to herself for her fingers to "burn with love" for Mindilhava, and he hears it. He takes the candles and places them in his cousin's fingers, then takes the princess, two razors and flees with her on a horse.

The next morning, Mindilhava's mother opens the room and discovers her niece has burnt to death. His aunt chases after them, and the pair throws behind the razors to delay her. Next, his sister comes after them, and Mindilhava shapeshifts the princess into a tree and himself into a dervish to trick her. Lastly, his own Dev-mother goes after them; Mindilhava creates a lake and turns himself and the princess into ducks. The Dev-mother comes and asks the ducks how they got there, and the ducks answer that she should tie two millstones around her neck and swim. The Dev-mother does that and drowns. The princess and Mindilhava go back to the Sultan's realm.

== Analysis ==
=== Tale type ===
Sakaoglu classified the tale, according to the Turkish Folktale Catalogue (TTV), as Turkish type TTV 98. In the Typen türkischer Volksmärchen ("Turkish Folktale Catalogue"), by Wolfram Eberhard and Pertev Naili Boratav, type TTV 98, "Der Pferdemann" ("The Horse Man"), corresponds in the international classification to tale type AaTh 425. (Note: Some publications use the initials EB or EbBo to refer to their catalogue.) In a later book, Boratav stated that the Catalogue registered 25 variants, but six more had been collected since its publication.

In his monograph about Cupid and Psyche, Jan-Öjvind Swahn acknowledged that Turkish type 98 was subtype 425A of his analysis, that is, "Cupid and Psyche", being the "oldest" and containing the episode of the witch's tasks. In the international index, however, Swahn's typing is indexed as type ATU 425B, "The Son of the Witch".

=== Motifs ===
==== The supernatural husband ====
In most of the variants collected, the supernatural husband is a horse, followed by a man with a donkey's head and a camel. In other tales, he may be a snake, a frog, or even Turkish hero Kaloghlan. According to Turkish scholarship, the snake is the second most common animal in tales of the Turkic-speaking world featuring the marriage between a human person and an animal. In the tales, a person marries a snake due to a threat to themselves or to a relative, like a father, a mother or a sibling. However, the snake is usually the cursed form of a person.

==== The heroine's tasks ====
Another motif that appears in the tale type is that the heroine must travel to another witch's house and fetch from there a box or casket she must not open. German folklorist Hans-Jörg Uther remarked that these motives ("the quest for the casket" and the visit to the second witch) are "the essential feature" of the subtype.

==== The heroes' Magic Flight ====
According to Christine Goldberg, some variants of the type show as a closing episode "The Magic Flight" sequence, a combination that appears "sporadically in Europe", but "traditionally in Turkey". As their final transformation to deceive the ogress mother, the princess becomes a tree and her supernatural husband becomes a snake coiled around it. Although this episode is more characteristic of tale type ATU 313, "The Magic Flight", some variants of type ATU 425B also show it as a closing episode. German literary critic Walter Puchner argues that the motif attached itself to type 425B, as a Wandermotiv ("Wandering motif").

== Variants ==
=== Turkey ===
==== Leylahar and Gülbahar ====
In a Turkish tale collected from an informant in Kahramanmaraş with the title Leylahar ile Gülbahar ("Leylahar and Gülbahar"), a woodcutter and his wife pray to Allah to have a son, even if he is a snake, thus a snake is born to them. Some time later, the snake son falls in love with the princess and asks his mother to court her on his behalf, but his mother is worried that they are poor and she will be dismissed as just a beggar. Still, the snake son produces some jewels for his mother and sends her to the palace. The guards mistake her for a beggar at first, but is brought to the padishah's presence, who agrees to their children's marriage, but first asks her to produce a palace and a garden more beautiful than the monarch's. The snake son fulfills the padishah's task and builds a shining golden palace. The padishah's daughter is brought to the wedding and is shocked at the sight of the snake. The snake's mother comforts her by saying her bridegroom is a handsome youth, and she enters the wedding chambers. The snake appears again and she screams, but he reveals his true form as a normal human named Leylahar, asking the princess, called Gülbahar, to keep his secret, lest he vanishes and she has to seek him out until she wears out golden shoes and a golden belt. Some time later, the princess is invited to a wedding and is endlessly mocked by the women at the party, while they watch a mysterious knight throw javelins in the games. Days into the celebration, after enduring the mockery thus far, Gülbahar reveals the knight is her snake husband, and he gallops away, never to be seen again. The princess asks her father for the golden apparel and begins a journey after him.

She passes by a spring where a maidservant is fetching water in a brass jug and asks for some, then reaches a second spring where another girl is fetching water with a golden jug for her master Leylahar. Gülbahar drops her ring into the jug, which Leylahar recognizes and goes to meet his wife outside. He turns her into a pin and brings it with him. The Devs can smell a human scent, so he turns his wife into an apple. However, the creatures still sense a foreign smell, and Leylahar turns Gülbahar back into human form and introduces has as his sister, threatening the Dev matriarch not to marry her daughter if they devour the human. Reluctantly, the dev woman makes a vow. Still, she soon forces her to fetch bird feathers for a mattress by going up the mountain - Leylahar tells her to summon the birds by saying he sends his regards. It happens thus and Gülhabar fulfills the task. Next, the dev woman gives the princess a "darbuka" and a box ("kutu", in the original), and orders her to deliver them to her sister. Leylahar intercepts his wife, warns her the box must not be opened, for it contains three devs that will jump out and devour her, and advises her how to proceed: pass by a fountain of pus and blood and compliment them, open a closed door and shut an open one, exchange the fodder between two animals (grass for a horse, meat for a dog), leave the box and darbuka only if the dev's sister is sleeping with her eyes open. Gülbahar follows the instructions to the letter, delivers the box and rushes back, the dev's sister commanding her servants to stop her, to no avail.

Finally, the dev woman celebrates her daughter's wedding to Leylahar, and both enter the wedding chambers. Leylahar kills his bride, turns into a fly and flees through a keyhole to meet his human wife near the fountain, and both escape. The next morning, the dev woman discovers her daughter is dead and sends her relatives after the runaway couple. On the road, in order to trick their pursuers, Leylahar transforms himself and the princess into other objects: first, into a poplar (the princess) and a snake coiled around it (him) to fool the dev's sister; next, into a fountain (her) and a stone (him) to trick the dev's brother; thirdly, into an orchard (her) and a seller (him) to deceive the dev's brother-in-law. The dev woman herself goes after them and they take refuge in a mosque. She asks for a last memento, and cuts off a finger from the dev's son. Leylahar and Gülbahar return home and celebrate a new wedding.

==== Şık Battal ====
In a Turkish tale collected from an informant from Çankiri with the title Şık Battal, a childless couple wishes for a son, and the woman prays to Allah for a son, even if he is a snake, thus one is born to them. One day, the snake son asks his mother to let him graze the cattle of their village. Despite some reservations, the woman allows it. The snake son takes the cattle far from the village, where he takes off the snakeskin to become a human youth, then puts on the snakeskin again when he returns home. He explains to his mother he will only be a snake until he marries, for it is God's command that he lives like this. It happens thus and he marries a human maiden. The next day, her aunt comes and looks at folded snakeskin, which she mistakes for rubbish and burns it. Şık Battal vanishes. His wife remembers that he asked her to look after his snakeskin, lest he becomes a bird, and she will only be able to find him after she wears down an iron stick and iron shoes. The girl walks for years on end, until she reaches a fountain, where she meets an Arab girl. The Arab girl is fetching water for Şık Battal's wedding, who is to be married to the daughter of a seven-headed dev. The girl asks the woman to call for Şık Battal. The Arab servant tells Şık Battal someone is outside looking for him, and he exits the dev's house to reunite with his wife.

In order to placate him, Şık Battal advises his wife to suckle on the dev's wife's breasts until he tells her to "make her teeth bone". His wife does as he says and is begrudgingly welcomed into the devs' midst. The next day, the dev-wife orders the girl to fetch bird feathers to make a mattress for her daughter - Şık Battal reveals the snakes, centipedes, wolves and birds are his friends and they will help her: they should go up a mountain, she should cover his face with a shroud and shout that Şık Battal is dead, and the birds will offer their feathers. It happens thus, and the dev-woman suspects the girl had help. Still, for the next task, the dev woman orders the girl to go to a relative of hers and fetch a quilt adorned with bells - a trap, since the other relative did not do the same vow. For this one, Şık Battal gives his wife a ring for her to use when she goes there to fetch the object. Failing twice to kill the human, the devs light four candles on each hand and forces the girl to illuminate the wedding couple for the whole night. It happens thus, and the girl cries to Şık Battal her fingers are burning. Thus, Şık Battal beheads the dev bride, puts out the candles and escapes with his human wife. The next morning, the dev sends his brothers after them. On the road, in order to elude their pursuers, Şık Battal and his wife turn themselves into objects: first, into a gargoyle (him) and a spring (his wife); then, into a maiden (him) and another spring (his wife); lastly, into a thorny branch (her) and a snake coiled around it (him). The dev himself comes to the pair and recognizes this transformation as them. Şık Battal then kills the seven-headed dev and returns home with his human wife.

==== Şah Mehemet ====
In a Turkish tale collected from a source in Kilis with the title Şah Mehemet, a padishah has an only daughter. One day, an old woman comes to sit before the padishah and propose on her son's behalf for three days. The padishah tries to get rid of her by ordering her son to provide forty camels loaded with gold, wheat, barley, and poultry. The prospective suitor provides his future father-in-law with 800 camels loaded with the requested gifts. He also builds a palace overnight, more beautiful than the padishah's. The monarch gives his daughter to be married to the snake, and she moves out to the snake's palace and finds the animal on their bed. Some days later, the snake husband reveals himself out of the snakeskin to the princess as a handsome human youth, and asks her not to reveal the secret. Later, the padishah organizes an equestrian tournament, which the snake husband competes in human form. The attendees mock the princess for her snake husband, and she eventually says the mysterious rider is her snake husband. The snake husband admonishes her for her betrayal, says she can find him when her iron shoes are worn out, her iron staff is bent and pigeons have made a nest on her head, then vanishes.

The princess mourns for her loss, then commissions the iron garments and goes in search for him. She wanders off in her metal shoes for years on end, until she stops to rest, thinking her journey is fruitless. However, she notices that the shoes are worn out, her iron staff is bent, and a pigeon's nest is on her head, which indicates she is near. Her husband appears to her and reveals his mother is a Dev (giant), but his human wife can gain her favour by suckling on her breasts. After the princess does this, the dev-mother suspects that this is her son's, Şah Mehemet, doing, then asks her son who is the newcomer. Şah Mehemet lies to his mother that she is a guest from God. Şah Mehemet is being forced to marry his aunt's daughter, and they are arranging the wedding. Şah Mehemet's dev-mother gives a letter to the princess and orders her to visit her dev-sister behind such and such a mountain, deliver her the letter, and fetch a ringing and singing "genni" - a trap, since the letter contains a command to devour the girl. Without knowing where to go, the princess sits down and cry, when her husband Şah Mehemet intercepts her. She gives him the letter, who reads the command and modifies its contents, then advises her how to proceed: pass by a river of blood and say it contains oil and honey; pass by a river of pus and say it contains butter and honey, walk over a thorny path and say the thorns are roses; exchange the fodder between two animals (meat for the dog, grass for a horse), deliver the letter to his dev-aunt, steal the ringing and singing box ("kutu") from a ledge while his aunt goes to sharpen her teeth and flee as soon as she can. The princess follows his instructions to the letter, delivers the letter to his aunt, steals the box and rushes back. The dev-aunt commands the animals, the thorns and the rivers to stop her, to no avail. Back home, the princess marvels at the object and presses a button, like a "televizyon", and accidentally releases something. Her husband appears to her, presses the same button and gives the box back to his wife to be delivered to his dev-mother.

Finally, Şah Mehemet is married to his cousin and both enter their chambers. After the bride falls asleep, he takes his human wife and both escape from his mother's house. On the road, Şah Mehemet's aunt and mother are coming after them in the shape of clouds, and Şah Mehemet and the princess turn into objects to trick their pursuers: first, into a well (the princess) and a bowl (Şah Mehemet); next, into a garden (her) and a gardener (him); lastly, into a tree (her) and snake coiled around it (him). Şah Mehemet's dev-mother reaches the tree and snake and goes to threaten them. Şah Mehemet asks for a kiss, and bites his mother's tongue, killing her. Şah Mehemet and the princess return home and live happily.

==== The Pasha and His Three Daughters ====
In a Turkish tale collected by professor Ali Abbas Çinar from a source in Bursa with the title Paşa ve Üç Kızı ("Pasha and his Three Daughters"), a pasha has a dream, wherein a voice tells him to take one of his daughters to a certain mansion, otherwise the pasha will be killed. The pasha decides to obey the voice and takes his elder daughter to the place, in bridal clothes. At the mansion, the girl sees a snake coming, hisses for some food to appear and gives some sherbet to the princess. The next night, the voice demands the middle daughter, who is brought to the mansion and given another sherbet. The third time, the pasha sends the youngest sister, who suspecsts something is amiss, eats the sherbet given by an Arab servant. The snake appears to her, drinks the sherbet, removes his snakeskin to become a human youth, and sleeps with the princess on a bed, leaving by the morning. The princess finds herself decorated with jewels.

Her sisters come to visit her and ask about her marital life, but she says she does not know, so her elder sisters advise her not to drink the sherbet by placing a sponge on her clothes. It happens thus, and the princess discovers the youth in the snakeskin, who questions her who told her about it. The princess reveals her elder sister did that, and the youth asks his wife not to tell anyone about it. Later, her elder sister is getting married, and the snake says they will go the princess's father's house and move out to the attic, but they must cover it with carpets and close the windows to hide the truth. He says he will attend the ceremony as a white rider on a white horse, and asks her not to tell anything. At the ceremony, the sisters mock the princess about a husband that goes who knows where. The snake husband applauds his wife for bearing the brunt of their mockery. The second time, the snake youth turns into a knight in red garments on a red horse, whom the sisters admire and mock their cadette for her mysterious husband. The third day, her husband turns into a rider in black garments and on a black horse and warns her not to tell anything, lest she will not find him again. He attends the celebration. The princess reveals to her sisters the rider is her husband. He vanishes.

At night, the princess's husband does not return home, and she waits for days for his return, to no avail. After mourning for him, she dons iron sandals and iron cane, and goes in search of her husband. She reaches a mountaintop and stops by a spring. A woman with a copper jug comes to fetch water and the princess asks for some to drink, but she denies her request, explaining the water is for her uncle. She returns home and tells her uncle, the snake prince who knows his wife is coming, about the person at the spring whom she did not give water, so she sends a second niece with a silver jug to the fountain. The second niece also refuses to give water to the princess, so he sends a third sister's daughter with a golden jug. The third time, the princess is given water to drink, and drops her jeweled ring inside it. The snake husband notices the ring in the jug and goes to meet his wife by the spring, asking what she is doing there. The princess is glad to see her husband, and refuses to go back without him, so he slaps her to turn her into an apple to hide her from his dev female relatives, aunts and sisters. His family sense a human smell and demand him present the human to them, but he makes them swear an oath not to hurt the human, and restores the princess to human form. One day, the creatures tell the girl they will find their son a local bride, and order the princess to sweep the mansion in an hour. Her husband advises her to take a basket, fill it in the garden and sprinkle it around the house. The dev-relatives suspect the boy had something to do with the newcomer, and he dismisses their comments by saying she is only a passerby he found in the mountain. Next, the dev-family places a cauldron and orders the princess to fill it with her tears - her snake husband advises her to fill it with water and sprinkle some salt. Thirdly, they are preparing the wedding, and order the princess to stand neither on the ground, nor in the sky - her husband advises her to swing on a swing and extend her legs.

Lastly, at night, the dev-family arranges for their son's wedding, and crucify the princess to the wall of the mosque ("cami", in the original), placing candles on her body for them to burn her as she illuminates the ceremony. The snake husband enters the mosque, closes the door, kills the bride and releases his human wife, then sends her ahead of him while he fetches provisions for the road. The next morning, the dev-family gloats that the human princess is dead and think their son is enjoying his bride, but they open the room and find the bride dead. The dev-family then send the little sister after them. On the road, the prince turns the princess into a tray of cherries and himself into a seller. Next, his other sister pursues them, and they turn into a baker (him) and some bread (the princess). Finally, his big sister comes after them, so he conjures up a lake, turns the princess into a poplar tree and himself into a snake coiled around it. The big sister thinks about cutting any part of the tree, but gives up and leaves them be.

==== Yilan Padişah ====
In a Turkish tale collected from a source named Coşkun Kandemir, from Akdagmadeni, in Yozgat, with the title Yılan Padişah ("Sultan Snake"), a poor man lives with three daughters, earning their living by collecting brooms and selling them, while the girls occupy themselves with domestic chores. One day, when the man goes to the mountain to collect brooms, a snake appears before him and demands his eldest daughter. The man returns home and asks his elder if she agrees to marry the snake, but she refuses. The next day, the man goes to another mountain to avoid the snake, and the animal meets him, demanding his middle daughter. The middle daughter also refuses to marry the serpent. Lastly, the man goes to yet another mountain, and the snake requests the man's youngest daughter. The man's cadette agrees, is readied to marry the snake and is taken to the snake's hollow. The snake appears and takes the girl forty stories down to an underground palace, when the snake reveals he is a handsome youth. The snake youth asks her not to tell his secret, and organizes their wedding ceremony. The girl's family is invited to the wedding and put on red clothes, but the girl is mocked by the elder two about marrying the snake. In the second day, everyone puts on green garments, and still the girls mock their cadette for her choice of husband. On the third day, they attend the ceremony in black vests, and the duo keep mocking the girl. However, the girl points to a handsome guest and says he is her husband. The Sultan Snake's relatives turn into snakes, and the man himself meets his wife, gives her a ring, a staff and sandals, and bid her to wear them out to find him again, then vanishes.

After years, the girl dons the ring, sandals and staff and goes in search of her husband. After a long journey, she stops next to a fountain, where she sees a girl fetching water. The text explains the girl drawing water is Sultan Snake's new bride-to-be and his aunt's daughter. The girl is asked by the stranger where she is taking the water, and explains it is for Sultan Snake's ablutions. Sultan Snake's true wife asks for some water to drink and drops his ring inside the jug. Sultan Snake finds the ring and asks his cousin if there is someone at the fountain, which his cousin confirms. Sultan Snake brings his wife and asks his aunt to let the stranger in, passing her off as a wandering girl. However, Sultan Snake's aunt suspects the newcomer is his human wife and orders her on difficult tasks: she plans to let the wolves and birds devour her, and orders her to go up the mountain and fetch feathers for a mattress and a quilt for the upcoming wedding. Sultan Snake advises his wife to sit under a tree and shout out that Sultan Snake is dead, and the wolves and birds will come to shed their fur and feathers. Next, Sultan Snake's aunt sends her to fetch apples and pears for her daughter. Sultan Snake advises his wife to sit under a tree and say that Sultan Snake is dead, and the trees will shake their branches to give her their fruits.

Failing both attempts, Sultan Snake's aunt conspires with her daughter to heat up the oven and burn the newcomer. However, Sultan Snake and his human wife take his cousin, still asleep, and throw her in the oven, then escape from the house. The next morning, Sultan Snake's aunt and mother discover their relative is dead and chase after them. On the road, Sultan Snake turns into a cleric or hoca and sings verses, tricking his female relatives. Next, he turns himself into a garden-keeper and an orchard to fool them. Lastly, the couple reach a garden, and they turn into a rose (the girl) and a snake coiled around its stem (Sultan Snake). His mother and aunt stop nearby, and his mother goes to check the garden, where she finds her son and his wife's transformation. Sultan Snake's mother promises to give her son the keys to the world, blesses their union and lets them go. Sultan Snake's aunt approaches her sister, suspects she helped her son, and devours her.

==== Padişahın Güccük Gizı ====
In a Turkish tale collected from a source named Şıhı Koyuncu, from Karakuyu village, with the title Padişahın Güccük Gizı, a shepherd works grazing the sheep. One day, he notices a she-goat is being milked, and he accuses a neighbour, who denies it. He then goes to investigate, and finds a snake suckling the she-goat. He tells his family about it, who advise him to kill it. The next day, the shepherd follows the snake to a house atop a mountain. Inside the house, he finds a youth, who reveals he is the ruler of the snakes ("yılanların padişahıyım", in the original) that can assume serpentine shape, and asks the man to adopt him and woo the padishah's daughters. The shepherd agrees and takes the youth home to court the princesses for a bride for him. The shepherd quits his job and goes to talk to the padishah about the marriage proposal between their children. The man tells the monarch his son is a snake, and the monarch consults with the princesses which one will want to marry the snake: the elder two refuse, save for the youngest, who agrees to her father's decision. The youngest princess meets the snake and sees him transforming into a handsome youth. They marry.

After their marriage, the elder princess is set to be married, and the snake youth tells his wife he will attend the celebration in human shape, as a knight, and she must not tell anyone, even if she walks in iron shoes and with an iron cane to find him. The youngest princess visits her father and her elder sister, and listens to their remarks about marrying a snake. Later, the middle sister is set to be married, and the snake husband repeats his warning. During the ceremony, the knight comes again, and the youngest princess says he is her husband. On saying this, the knight disappears as part of his spell. She goes to talk with the snake's adoptive father, who tells her that he has departed like a "Sarıyıldız", and cannot be found in their land anymore. He then gives her iron shoes and an iron cane, and she goes to search for him.

After some time, she reaches a spring next to a house of devs. She suckles on the female dev's breasts to win her to her side, and the female dev welcomes her. The dev-sons appear and sense a human smell, but the female dev dismisses it. The next morning, the female dev gives the princess an object to help her cross a river in her quest. The princess crosses a river and, after six months, she reaches another fountain, where another dev's daughter is fetching water. The princess asks for some water to drink, and drops her husband's ring inside it. The snake youth finds the ring inside the jug and asks the dev-daughter if she saw someone at the fountain. The dev-daughter says there is a woman at the spring, and the snake youth goes to meet his human wife.

The snake youth admonishes his wife for breaking his disguise, but takes her in and passes her off as his sister who has come for a visit, despite the dev-daughter's suspicions. The snake youth advises his wife on how to proceed with the dev-family's tasks in getting feathers for the bed and in going to a neighbour, which she must do in a quick manner. The dev-family suspects the snake youth alerted the princess about it. The next day, the couple kill the dev-daughter, leave her head in a room, and escape. The dev-family goes to check on their daughter, find her dead and chase after the snake youth and the princess, but they shapeshift to trick them: the second time, they transform into a cypress tree ("selvi gavag") and an ivy ("sarmaşık"). The dev-family leaves them be, and the couple return to the snake youth's adoptive father.

==== Emir Yemen ====
In a Turkish tale collected by professor Necati Demir from an informant from Ulaş, Tarsus, Mersin province, with the title Emir Yemen, a woman is childless. One day, she finds a snake and makes a wish that she wants to have a son even if he is a snake. The woman takes the little snake home and places him in a basin. One day, he is grown up and wants to be married. His mother questions him about who would marry a snake, but arranges a wedding with a niece, whom the snake bites to death. The woman finds another niece for him to marry and still kills her. The snake himself suggests he marries his aunt's youngest daughter. The woman brings her youngest niece, who does not fear the snake bridegroom. The snake reveals he is not a snake, whose name is Emir Yemen, and makes her promise not to reveal his secret. Sometime later, a wedding happens in the village and Emir Yemen attends the javelin throwing games as a human, while his wife's friends mock her for marrying the snake and not the javelin thrower. The second time, he attends the celebration as a knight on a black horse with a black dog, then as a knight on a white horse and a white dog. On the third occasion, the girl, called Fatma, annoyed at her friends' comments, tells that the knight is her husband, Emir Yemen. He vanishes, but returns home to admonish her, and saying she will only find him again when she wears out iron shoes and an iron hat.

Fatma dons the iron apparel and goes after him. She passes by the golden castle where a maidservant is drawing water with a golden pitcher, and asks her if she saw Emir Yemen. The servant does not know, but directs Fatma to the silver castle. At the silver castle, Fatma finds a second maidservant drawing water with a silver pitch. The second servant does not know, so she directs Fatma to the Copper Castle. At the Copper Castle, Fatma asks the maidservant drawing water with a copper pitcher about Emir Yemen. The maidservant enters the Copper Castle and meets her master, Emir Yemen, to whom she comments on the stranger by the fountain in iron clothes. Emir Yemen orders the maidservant to give water to the stranger. Fatma drinks from the pitcher and finds Emir Yemen's ring inside the jug, so she knows he is there.

They are in the land of the Devs, and Emir Yemen is being forced to marry the Dev's daughter, while Fatma is made to be their slave. One day, the dev orders Fatma to go to her sister and fetch a tambourine for the wedding - a trap. Emir Yemen advises her how to proceed: wash her hands and drink blood from a river of blood, then compliment its water; drink from a river of pus and compliment its water; pluck a thorn from a thorn bush and smell it, exchange the fodder between two animals (grass for a horse, meat for a dog), straighten an upside down ladder, then meet the Dev's sister. Fatma follows his instructions and knocks on the Dev-sister's door. The creature welcomes her, bids her enter while she goes to bring the drum. She places some yogurt for Fatma to eat, but the girl throws it to a cat and a mouse, which eat the yogurt and die. Fatma steals the tambourine from under the stairs and rushes back, while the Dev-sister commands the objects, the animals, the thorns and the rivers to stop her, to no avail. The dev suspects that this was Emir Yemen's doing, so next she orders Fatma to bring forty kinds of silk from the river - Emir Yemen advises her to go to the river, toss seven square stones and utter that Emir Yemen sends his regards, then ask for silk.

The Dev is still suspicious, so she orders Fatma to bring bird feathers from the top of the mountain - Emir Yemen advises her to call on the mountains, the stone and the flying birds, since Emir Yemen's wedding is happening and he needs feathers, and the birds will come to shed their feathers for her. The birds shed all their feathers for her, which Fatma brings to the Dev. Still suspicious, the Dev decides to kill Fatma, so Emir Yemen takes his wife and flees back to their village, with the Devs after them. On the road, they shapeshift to trick their pursuers: first, into a garden (her) and a gardener (him), then into a fountain (her) and a bowl (her), and lastly into a pine tree (her) and a snake (him). The Dev approaches the couple, realizes the snake is Emir Yemen, and orders him to resume his form. Emir Yemen asks the Dev to open her tongue. She does so and Emir Yemen, in snake form, bites her tongue to kill her. Emir Yemen and Fatma return to their village.

==== Berlihava ====
In a Turkish tale collected from an informant in Karacalar, Ulaş District, in Sivas, with the title Berlihava, a padishah has three daughters and marries them off: the elder to a vizier, the middle one to a kizir (a type of village chief), and the third to a rock. The cadette princess cries, when the rock splits open and she falls inside. She finds flour and other provisions inside the rock. One day, a snake appears to her while she is eating, and begins to cry. The snake simply watches the princess intently. After she stops crying, the princess offers some soup to the snake, which eats and leaves. This goes on for days on end, until one day the snake sheds its skin and reveals himself to be a handsome youth. He asks her to keep the secret and to say only that that she was given to a rock to marry a snake. They start to live together. Sometime later, the padishah invites his daughters to their brother's wedding, but not his cadette. The queen asks for her husband to invite their daughter. She attends the celebrations and reunites with friends and relatives, who mock her for marrying a snake. Annoyed at their mockery, she declares that her husband is a handsome man. From a window, the snake hears his wife's voice, admonishes her that he is leaving these lands, and says she will only find him again if she wears down an iron staff, an iron cap, and iron sandals. He vanishes. The princess mourns for her husband's disappearance and forgets about her brother's wedding. She then leaves the celebrations in search of Berlihava, her husband.

She reaches a river and meets a Dev-woman who takes her to his house and hides the human from her Dev-sons. The Dev-sons arrive and smell human flesh, so the Dev-woman introduces the princess to them and asks them if they know of Berlihava. They do not know, but mention that their cousins from another aunt may have the answers, but they can be reached if one takes the dev-sons' fingernails, a stick, and their bathwater to drop in another river. After the dev-sons go to sleep, the Dev-woman feeds her sons and sees the princess off, giving her the objects for her journey. The princess opens a path by dropping the bathwater in the river, using the stick to beat up a bush, and throwing the fingernails on stones to reveal the path. She eventually reaches the house of a seven-headed Dev and enters through the chimney, then suckles the dev-woman's large breasts since she is hungry, and greets her. The seven-headed dev-woman says that the princess has done right, otherwise the human would have been devoured. The princess asks if she saw Berlihava, but the dev-woman does not know. Even after the seven-headed dev-woman's sons do not know, but mention a relative, a great aunt, who may know.

The princess enters the house of another dev-woman and kisses her hand and foot. The dev-woman allows her to stay and hides her from her sons when they arrive. She is asked about Berlihava, and says that her eldest son may know. The Dev-sons arrive home, and their mother asks about Berlihava. The eldest Dev-son says that one has to walk towards a spring, and if the iron sandals on the feet, the iron cap on the head and worn out, and the iron staff is bent, that means one found Berlihava. The dev-woman sees her sons off to the mountains, takes the princess out of hiding and directs her to the path. The princess reaches the fountain and cries that her iron apparel is worn out. She drinks some water and sleeps. Berlihava appears to her and opens his wings over her to provide shade for his wife. The princess wakes up and Berlihava asks why she is there, then carries her on his wings to his mother. He introduces the princess as a maid, then flies away. Berlihava's mother glares at the girl and orders her to sweep the streets for Çinimeci's wedding so that the horses' hooves do not become dirty. The princess takes a broom to sweep the streets and cries. Berlihava appears to her and helps her in the task: he summons rain to rain on the streets, then wind to sweep the streets. Berlihava's mother suspects that this was her son's job.

The following morning, the woman orders the princess to fill a mattress ("şilte", in the original) with bird feathers. The princess takes the mattress and goes to the mountains to pluck some feathers. Berlihava appears to her and tells her to extend her hand and to summon the "birds of Berlihava" to flutter their wings, and they will shed their feathers for her. It happens thus, and the princess returns with the filled mattress, but his mother still suspects that this was her son's doing. Two days later, Berlihava's mother prepares the wedding between Berlihava and Çinimeci. They enter the bridal chambers, but he nails Çinimeci to a pole, takes the princess and escapes with her on his wings. His mother enters the bridal chambers, sees Çinimeci is tied to a pole, and sends her sisters after the couple. On the road, Birlihava and the princess realize they are being chased, and transform into objects to trick their pursuers: first, into a garden (her) and a farmer (him); then into a spring (her) and a water stone (him). Lastly, Berlihava's mother chases after her son, and he transforms the princess into a bush and himself into a snake coiled around it. His mother approaches the bush and asks her son to stick out his tongue for a kiss, but the snake hisses to keep her away. His mother ceases her pursuit, returns home and tells her sisters about their transformation and how the snake does not let anyone next to the bush. Berlihava and the princess wander off through valleys and mountains and settle down in a hut.

==== Ahmet Bey ====
In a Turkish tale from Erzincan with the title Ehmet Beg or Ahmet Bey, a poor mother lives with her son; she sews and he sells her wares for a living. One day, he finds some boys attacking a snake, so he tells them to stop and spare the animal. The boys trade the yarn for the snake. The snake thanks the boy and says his name is Ehmet Beg (Ahmet Bey). He also wants to be married, and can assume human form. He repays the boy with gold. With his human wife, he removes his snakeskin to become a youth, and asks her to keep the secret and look after the snakecoat so that no one burns it, lest the girl has to wear down iron shoes and carry an iron stick to search for him. One time, the girl's sisters pay her a visit, find the snakecoat and toss it in a stove. Ahmet Bey tells his wife he will depart, and returns to his parents who are Devs. The girl goes after him and finds him at his mother's house. Ahmet Bey reunites with his wife and warns her that they will eat her, but she says to let them do it. Ahmet Bey slaps her head and behind, turns her into another form to hide her from his parents, and enters his house. His parents sense a human smell and Ahmet Bey turns his wife into an apple to hide her. Still, his parents sense her presence, so Ahmet Bey makes his parents swear an oath not to devour the human, lest he kills himself. The dev-parents swear and he reveals his human wife to them. Despite this, he is betrothed to his mother's sister's daughter. Ahmet Bey gives his human wife a ring to call on him if she needs his help.

One day, the dev-mother orders the girl to take a rug and fill it for Ahmet Bey's wedding. She cries for the task, when Ahmet Bey appears and tells his wife he will lie down dead and she is to cry that Ahmet Bey is dead, so the birds will come to give her their feathers. It happens thus, and the girl dismisses the birds by saying that he is alive. She brings the rug to his mother, and she suspects that this was Ahmet Bey's doing, so she assigns another task: to bring a saz and a tambourine for the wedding. She calls on her husband and he appears to her. Ahmet Bey says this is a trap, and advises her how to proceed: pass by a field of "dadaş" and say it is full of roses and hyacinths, help a man by fetching an object he lost up a branch, compliment a stream of blood, exchange the fodder between two animals (grass for a horse, meat for a dog), place a ring on a tray and, while his relatives are sharpening their teeth, she is to steal the musical instruments and rush back. The girl follows Ahmet Bey's instructions to the letter and flees with the instruments, with his relatives commanding the servants to stop her, to no avail. She delivers the saz and tambourine to her mother-in-law, who still suspects this was her son's doing. Finally, they marry Ahmet Bey to another bride and place lits candles on the fingers of his human wife, so that they melt over her body. Ahmet Bey takes the candles and places them in the hands of the false bride and escapes with his human wife. His dev-family wakes in the morning and cannot find neither Ahmet Bey nor the human girl, only the dead bride, and chase after the escaping couple. On the road, they shapeshift into an orchard and a garden-keeper, and a rosebush and a collector to trick their pursuers. Ahmet Bey and his human wife return to their homeland and live in happiness.

=== Karapapakh people ===
In a tale collected from a Karapapakh informant named Metin Taş, from Kuskayasi village, with the title Bayrahtar, a couple sigh that they do not have children, and pray to Allah for one. One day, the man walks on the road and meets a group of dervishes plucking apples. One of the dervishes gives the man an apple, with instructions to give half to his wife and eat the other half. The man returns home, explains the situation to his wife, and both eat their half of the apple. After nine months, the woman gives birth to a black snake, and they lament their situation. After five days, the black snake begins to talk and asks his parents to court the local padishah's daughter. The woman questions her snake son's interest in the princess and doubts the rich padishah would allow such a marriage, but the snake son insists.

The woman goes to the padishah's palace and reveals her son's intent to marry the princess. The padishah agrees, but orders that a palace is built that overshadows his own. The woman returns home and tells the padishah's order, which the snake son fulfills during the night. The following morning, the woman goes to talk to the padishah again, and this time he asks for a marble road to be built between both palaces where camels and horses can rest. The black snake son fulfills the second suitor's task, to the padishah's surprise, and he is forced to go through with their marriage.

The padishah arranges for the princess's wedding, and she enters the bridal chambers to wait for her husband. The black snake slithers towards and she screams. The black snake asks her to have no fear, says he is her bridegroom, and asks her to keep a secret even from his own parents: he removes the snakeskin and becomes a handsome youth. The black snake and the princess live together for months. One day, the padishah invites his daughter and son-in-law to his palace, and the black snake senses something bad will happen to them, and makes the princess promise to keep his snakeskin safe. At the padishah's palace, they gather for a meal, the princess's sisters take a look at their cadette's trunk and find the snakeskin. They heat up a tandoor, when the princess finds them ready to burn the snakeskin. The princess begs her sisters not to do it, but they toss the snakeskin in the fire. The human black snake feels his body on fire, leaves the room, and returns as a bird, admonishing his wife for revealing the secret. The bird tells the princess she will only find him by wearing iron shoes and walking with an iron cane towards the fountain of the sunrise.

The bird flies off, and the princess cries for his departure. She dons the iron shoes and walks through cities, valleys and mountains in search of such a fountain, to no avail. She meets a shepherd on the mountains, who directs her to a pair of harvesters. The harvesters tell the princess they heard someone crying about being burned next to a lake where three doves come to bathe. The princess realizes this is the sunrise spring. The harvesters say two white birds are female fairies and the blue one is male, and she is to hide if she wants to talk to the blue bird. The princess reaches the lake and hides in the bushes, waiting for the doves to come. The white birds come, remove their birdskins to turn into fairies, bathe in the water, then fly off, and the blue bird does the same to his avian disguise. The princess sits on her husband's birdskin and reunites with him. The human black snake, called Bayrahtar, says the white doves are fairy sisters, one his bride and the other her sister, and he is set to be married soon. He also has a "Gaynana", so he will pass the princess off as a new servant.

Bayrahtar advises his human wife to clasp her hands, go up a mountain and call to him, and he will appear to help her. The Gaynana begins to order the princess around: first, she orders the princess to fetch bird feathers for bed clothes for her daughter. The princess climbs up the mountain and summons her husband, explaining she needs bird feathers for sheets, a mattress and pillows. Bayrahtar summons the birds to give her their feathers. The fairy family's matriarch suspects Bayrahtar had a hand in the task. The princess continues to do chores for them. On the wedding day, the fairy matriarch orders the princess to go to her sister, invite her to the wedding and get a drum ("davulu") from her, but she lives in a seven year distance journey. Bayrahtar appears to the princess, flies with next to the road to the fairy mother's sister, and advises her how to proceed: compliment a blackthorn bush by saying it has roses and take some to wear it in her hair; drink water from two pools, one with blood, the other with pus, and say they have freshwater; close an open door, open a closed one, exchange the fodder between two animals (grass for a horse, meat for a dog), enter the house, take a broom from the shelf and make it stand, and suckle the sister's breasts. The princess follows the instructions to the letter and meets the fairy's sister, gets the drum and rushes back. The fairy's sister, unable to hurt the princess, commands her servants to stop her, to no avail. On the road back to meet Bayrahtar, the princess hears a buzzing sound coming from the drum and opens it: out comes out a fly ("sinek"). Bayrahtar appears, admonishes the princess for opening the drum, and orders the birds to capture the fly back into the box. It happens thus and the princess delivers the drum to the fairy, to her astonishment.

On the wedding day, the princess plays the drum, and Bayrahtar marries the peri bride. At night, while the peri family is asleep, he meets his human wife and escapes with her in the dead of night. The following morning, the peri bride notices her bridegroom escaped and they chase after them. On the road, Bayrahtar and the princess shapeshift to trick their pursuers: first, into a garden (her) and a garden-keeper (him) to trick the peri bride; next, into a spring and a bowl to trick the peri sister-in-law; lastly, into a large cypress tree (the princess) and a large snake coiled around it (him). The peri mother realizes the transformation is the couple and threatens to kill the pair. Feigning defeat, Bayrahtar, in snake form, asks the peri mother for a last kiss, then spits venom directly into her mouth. Bayrahtar takes the princess back to his human parents' house, then they tell the king the princess has returned. They celebrate a new wedding.

== See also ==
- The Green Serpent
- The Horse-Devil and the Witch
- Khastakhumar and Bibinagar
- Yasmin and the Serpent Prince
- The Snake-Prince Sleepy-Head
- The Padisah's Youngest Daughter and Her Donkey-Skull Husband
- The Tale of Aftab
- The Spotted Deer (Turkish folktale)
