= The Padisah's Youngest Daughter and Her Donkey-Skull Husband =

Turkish fairy tale

The Padishah's Youngest Daughter and Her Donkey-Skull Husband is a Turkish fairy tale collected and published by folklorist Barbara K. Walker. The story follows a princess who marries a youth magically concealed within a donkey skull. After breaking his trust, she loses him and embarks on a perilous journey to his mother’s home, where she is subjected to a series of arduous tasks to reclaim him.

The tale belongs to the international folklore cycle classified as Animal as Bridegroom or The Search for the Lost Husband (ATU 425). This narrative type typically involves a human protagonist marrying a supernatural spouse, losing them through a broken prohibition, and undertaking a quest to restore the relationship. The story shares thematic parallels with the Graeco-Roman myth of Cupid and Psyche, as recorded in Apuleius' Metamorphoses. Both narratives feature a heroine who must endure trials imposed by a supernatural maternal figure (often interpreted as a witch or mother-in-law) to reunite with her estranged husband. Such tales emphasize motifs of forbidden curiosity, marital separation, and redemptive perseverance.

Barbara K. Walker included the tale in her compilation Turkish Folktales (1990), contributing to the study of Anatolian oral traditions. The story underscores cultural variations of the ATU 425 cycle, highlighting motifs unique to Turkish storytelling, such as the donkey-skull disguise and the symbolic trials reflecting societal expectations of loyalty and resilience.

== Sources ==
The Padishah's Youngest Daughter and Her Donkey-Skull Husband is a Turkish fairy tale published in 1993 by folklorist Barbara K. Walker. The story, archived in the Uysal–Walker Archive of Turkish Oral Narrative, was first recorded in 1970 from the oral tradition of storyteller Niyâzi Çam in Bursa Province.

== Summary ==
The padishah gathers everyone in the palace courtyard so that his three daughters may toss their apples to choose their husbands. When the third daughter throws hers, it lands near a donkey skull. As per tradition, she marries the donkey skull. However, inside the nuptial chamber, her husband reveals himself to be a handsome youth. He warns her never to reveal his true form, as doing so will cause him to disappear, forcing her to embark on a quest to find him.

Life goes on, and one day, the princess visits the women's public bath. There, she is mocked for having married a donkey skull. Frustrated by the ridicule, she impulsively reveals her husband's secret. Shortly after, he arrives at the bathhouse to reprimand her, telling her that she may never find him again, even if she walks with an iron cane and wears a pair of iron shoes. With that, he vanishes. Determined to find him, the princess sets off on her journey, wearing a pair of iron shoes.

Her search takes her to Pearl Mountain, the Gold Fountain, and the Diamond Fountain, where her husband resides in a mansion. They reunite, but he warns her that his mother is a giantess who may devour her. To protect his wife, he transforms her into a broom to hide her from his mother. The next day, he persuades the giantess not to harm a padishah's daughter if she arrives. With her reluctant agreement, he restores the princess to her human form.

The giantess then sets the princess a series of impossible tasks: to sweep and not sweep her house, to fill forty cauldrons with her tears, to climb a mountain, enter another mansion, and retrieve a closed box. The husband secretly advises her on how to succeed—she must drink from a bitter fountain and praise its taste, eat a sour pear and compliment it, close an open door and open a closed one, and swap the food of two animals (giving meat to a lion and grass to a horse). Following his instructions, she retrieves the box and escapes. However, overcome by curiosity, she opens it, unleashing "wild music." Her husband arrives just in time to close the box again. She then delivers it to the giantess.

That night, the couple decide to flee the mansion, with his family in pursuit. To evade them, they transform first into a minaret and a mosque, then into a sheep and a flock of sheep, and finally into a poplar tree (the princess) and a snake coiled atop it (the prince). When the giantess reaches the tree, the snake asks her for a kiss, then spits venom into her mouth, killing her. With the danger gone, the princess and her husband return to her kingdom.

== Analysis ==
=== Tale type ===
In the Typen türkischer Volksmärchen ("Turkish Folktale Catalogue") compiled by Wolfram Eberhard and Pertev Naili Boratav, the variants featuring a horse husband are grouped under a single type: TTV 98, Der Pferdemann ("The Horse Man"), which corresponds to tale type AaTh 425 in the international classification. (Note: Some publications use the initials EB or EbBo to refer to their catalogue.) In a later publication, Boratav noted that although the Catalogue registered 25 variants, an additional six had been collected since its original release.

In his monograph on Cupid and Psyche, Jan-Öjvind Swahn acknowledged that Turkish type 98 represents subtype 425A in his analysis—that is, the "Cupid and Psyche" variant, considered the oldest and containing the episode of the witch's tasks. However, in the international index, Swahn’s classification is listed as type ATU 425B, "The Son of the Witch."

=== Motifs ===
==== The supernatural husband ====
In most of the collected variants, the supernatural husband is depicted as a horse, followed by a man with a donkey's head and a camel. In other tales, he may appear as a snake, a frog, or even as the Turkish hero Kaloghlan.

==== The heroine's tasks ====
Another recurring motif in this tale type involves the heroine traveling to another witch's house to retrieve a box or casket that she is forbidden to open. German folklorist Hans-Jörg Uther noted that these motifs—specifically "the quest for the casket" and the visit to the second witch—constitute "the essential feature" of this subtype.

==== The heroes' Magic Flight ====
According to Christine Goldberg, some variants of this tale type conclude with a "Magic Flight" sequence—a combination that appears sporadically in Europe but traditionally in Turkey. In these versions, as a final transformation to deceive the ogress mother, the princess becomes a tree while her supernatural husband transforms into a snake coiled around it. Although this episode is more characteristic of tale type ATU 313, "The Magic Flight," some variants of ATU 425B also include it as a closing episode. German literary critic Walter Puchner argues that the motif became attached to type 425B as a Wandermotiv ("Wandering motif").

== Variants ==
=== Turkey ===
==== Shah Bender ====
Turkologist Ignác Kúnos published a tale titled Шаһ Бäндäр (Turkish: Şah Bender; English: "Shah Bender") in the 8th volume of Vasily Radlov's Proben der volkslitteratur der türkischen stämme. In this tale, translated by Johannes Østrup as Shah Bender, three princesses cast their lot with apples in a contest to choose their husbands. The youngest princess throws her apple, and it lands near a donkey. She marries the donkey, who subsequently reveals that he is a prince named Shah Bender and warns her not to reveal their secret. The following day, he participates in his father-in-law's tournament as a mysterious knight and defeats his opponents. Out of pride, the princess informs her family that the mysterious knight is her husband, and he vanishes.

Determined to find him, the princess embarks on a quest during which she encounters an ogress who gives her a walnut and sends her on her way. This event recurs twice more, with the princess acquiring a lemon and a pomegranate. Eventually, she reaches a kingdom with three castles; a servant emerges from each castle, and she bribes them with the fruits to secure a night’s stay. She also cleans a bloodied shirt during her journey.

Her mother-in-law then begins to mistreat her, forcing her to sweep the floor under penalty of death and to fill a kettle with her tears. Ultimately, Shah Bender's mother arranges his betrothal to another girl and compels the princess to bear ten candles tied to her fingers. When Shah Bender notices that her fingers are burning, she explains that it is her heart that burns. In response, Shah Bender tosses the candles onto the false bride, rescues his princess, and both escape in a transformation sequence. In their final forms, the princess transforms into a cypress and Shah Bender becomes a seven-headed monster.

==== Donkey Prince ====
In a Turkish Anatolian tale collected by professor Necati Demir titled Eşek Prens or Eşek Şehzade ("Donkey Prince"), a man finds a donkey in a field that implores him to take it home. When the man does so, the donkey transforms into a youth who requests that the man courts the padishah's daughter on his behalf. Overcome with fear, the man returns home at night and informs the donkey youth that he cannot comply. In response, the donkey orders him to go the next day under threat of death. Consequently, the man proceeds to the padishah's palace to court the princess. However, the padishah sets a condition: any suitor must first complete the task of building a palace more beautiful than his own. The man relays the challenge to the donkey youth, who produces two hairs that he rubs together to summon a djinn, commanding it to construct the palace. The following day, upon seeing the magnificent palace, the padishah marries his daughter to the donkey in a ceremony lasting 40 days and 40 nights.

The princess meets the youth beneath the donkey skin and falls in love with him. Later, as the padishah extends the festivities by arranging riding competitions, the donkey youth informs the princess that he will compete in disguise. He cautions her not to reveal his identity, warning that if she does, he will vanish and she will only be able to find him by wearing down a pair of iron sandals and bending an iron cane. During the tournament, he appears on the first day in black garments on a black horse, on the second day in red vestments on a red horse, and on the third day in white clothes on a white horse. When the princess declares that the mysterious contestant is her husband, the audience celebrates his prowess—only for him to vanish immediately thereafter.

Distraught, the princess recalls his advice and sets out in search of him, donning the iron sandals and carrying the iron cane. Her quest leads her first to a copper house, where a maidservant reveals that she has not seen the princess's husband and directs her to the next location. The princess then visits a silver house, again finding no sign of him, until finally she reaches a golden house. There, a maidservant drawing water points to a nearby tree under which a youth rests. At this moment, the princess realizes that her iron sandals are worn out and her iron cane is bent. The donkey youth reunites with his wife but warns her that his elder sister, who lives nearby, might devour her. To protect her, he transforms her into an apple and pockets it. Upon entering the house, his elder sister detects a human scent on him. The donkey youth shows her the apple, claiming it to be his wife, and extracts a promise from her not to devour it. The princess then regains her human form.

Despite her promise, the donkey youth's elder sister contrives to have the princess sent to his younger sister to be devoured and orders her to fetch a ladle. As the princess begins the arduous journey, her husband intercepts her, warning that the task is a trap. He advises her to close an open door and open a closed one, to exchange the fodder between two animals (substituting meat for a dog and grass for a horse), and to reach his sister's house, where, while she is occupied in another room, she must steal the ladle and return quickly. The princess follows his instructions precisely, retrieves the ladle, and runs back. Although the younger sister commands the animals and the door to hinder her progress, they fail to do so.

Undeterred, the donkey youth's sisters conspire next to send the princess to their middle sister so that she, too, may be devoured, ordering her to fetch a sieve. Recognizing their scheme, her husband advises that they escape. Transforming into a large bird, he carries his princess away and flies into the sky. Realizing the couple has fled, his sisters pursue them in a cloud of smoke. On the road, as they become aware of their pursuers, the prince—still in bird form—lands and transforms himself into a pool while the princess becomes water, thereby deceiving his younger sister. Later, when his elder sister again gives chase, the donkey prince transforms the princess into a rose and himself into a snake coiled around it. His elder sister, recognizing them, threatens to kill the pair, but the prince devises a plan: remaining in snake form, he asks his sister for a goodbye kiss. When she leans in to kiss the snake, he bites her to death. He then carries the princess back to her kingdom, and they live happily together. According to Necati Demir, the tale was first collected in 2005, from informant H. Demir, in Şahinköy village, Divriği District, in Sivas province.

==== Eşmanip (Afyon) ====
In a Turkish tale collected by Muhsine Helimoğlu Yavuz with the title Eşmanip, a childless old cowherd has no son. His wife sights a donkey foal and prays to have a son like that young animal. Eventually, she gives birth to a donkey colt. One day, he begins to talk and asks his parents to take him to school for his lessons. Years later, when the donkey son is twenty years old, he asks his parents to court the padishah's daughter, and gives his mother a bag of gold. The woman goes to the padishah and explains her son's proposal. The padishah agrees, but asks for some tasks first: first, raze the mountain near the palace; next, build a palace on its place and a garden with fruits and blooms, despite being winter - each of tasks given a 40 days' time for completion. Eşmanip fulfills the tasks, for he is the sultan of the jinns, and commands his servants, demons and djinns, do it for him. He then marries the princess and, on the wedding night, takes off his donkeyskin to become a handsome youth, then puts on the skin in the morning. Time passes, and the padishah invites his daughter and son-in-law for a meal. Eşmanip takes off the donkeyskin and comes to dinner in human form. On the same occasion, the princess tells her mother about her husband's secret, and the queen urges her daughter to burn the animal disguise. The princess does it, Eşmanip admonishes his wife for doing it, saying she will only find him in the land of the djinn, turns into a dove and flies away. The princess goes after him with two bags of gold and a horse. She reaches a city and, on not finding him, builds a bakery and offers bread to people, asking them about Eşmanip. Failing that, she builds a second bakery in search of information, but no one seems to know her husband's location. Even after she sells her mount to continue her journey, she cannot seem to find him, until she sights a house in a meadow with a garden nearby. The princess plucks an apple from a tree, and the trees chastise her, mentioning the name of Eşmanip. The princess knows she is close, and finds some djinn girls working in the garden, who take her in as night falls. The princess is hired as their cook. Months later, she prepares some soup for Eşmanip and drops his ring inside it. Eşmanip recognizes his wife's ring and they reunite. He then sends for his subjects and places them under a forty day sleeping cycle, so the couple will seize the opportunity to escape. The couple take a magic jug, a magic comb and a magic mirror, then make their escape. After their forty day cycle, the djinns realize Eşmanip is gone and taken the cook with him, then chase after the couple. On the road, the couple notice their pursuers are closing in and throw behind them the objects they brought with them: the jug creates a vast sea, the comb a forest, and the mirror a field of glass shards. Eşmanip and the princess return safely to the padishah's kingdom and remarry. According to Yavuz, the tale was collected from a fifty-two-year old informant named Yılmaz Gürkan, in Sandikli, Afyon province, who heard it from his uncle.

==== Eşmanip (Tokat) ====
In a Turkish tale collected by Necati Demir with the title Eşmanip, an old woman prays to Allah to have a child, even if he is a donkey. Thus, a donkey is born to her, whom she calls Eşmanip. The donkey son grows up until he is too large to be at home, so his mother ties him to the stable. The donkey son wants to learn, so his mother lets him go to school, but the teacher places him on the outside to hear the lessons. Years later, he asks his mother to marry. He is so insistent with his request, his mother asks whom he wants to marry, and he answers that he wishes for the Sultan's daughter. The woman goes there, but is mistaken as a beggar and sent home, so she tells her son she will quit trying to go to the sultan's palace. Eşmanip tells his mother not to worry, and bids her open a chest in her room and put on some clothes, pay a golden coin to each guard and ask for the hand of the Sultan's daughter. Eşmanip's mother does as instructed and announces to the Sultan her son is a donkey that wishes to have the princess as his bride. The Sultan is offended by the prospect of marrying his daughter to an animal since he has an entire court of grand viziers, commands and other rich men, but relents and agrees to let the donkey vye for the Sultan's daughter, provided he fulfills some requests first: first, the Sultan asks for the donkey to provide chests full of gold in a single day - Eşmanip tells his mother that a caravan will pass by their house with gold, so she is to go to the palace and deliver the chests; next, to raze in a single day a large mountain that blocks the sunrise from a certain location - Eşmanip simply tells his mother not to worry, and the following day the mountain is no more; thirdly, for the donkey bridegroom to build a palace on the place where the mountain once stood, also in a single day - a palace materializes overnight.

Defeated, the Sultan agrees to go through with the marriage. The princess laments that she is marrying a donkey, and cannot look at him even as he enters their room. Suddenly, Eşmanip removes his donkey skin to become human and the princess falls in love with him. Days pass, and the princess decides she has had enough of his dual nature and burns the donkey skin. Eşmanip admonishes his wife that "they" will find him and not give them respite, so he has to leave, but gives her a ring. Eşmanip departs, and the princess decides to look for him for many years. At last she reaches a palace, where she is taken as a servant. She works in the kitchen, and, one day, she accidentally drops Eşmanip's ring in the soup she is preparing, which is sent to the local Sultan. When the sultan tastes the soup, he notices the ring and realizes his wife is there. Eşmanip reunites with his wife, and explains he is the king of the jinn, but he wanted to relinquish this life, so he took the form of a donkey; and that, since his disguise was destroyed, he had to return to the jinns. Eşmanip then gives the princess a bottle of magic water and a magic comb, then takes a horse and both escape from the land of the jinns. The jinn subjects realize Eşmanip has fled, so they chase after them. On the road, Eşmanip and the princess realize they are being pursued, so they throw behind the objects to deter them: the bottle of magic water creates a layer of ice, and the comb creates a large thicket of inexpugnable thorns. The jinns cease their pursuit, and Eşmanip returns with his wife to their palace. The tale was collected in 2007, from a female informant named from M. Dere, in Üzümören, Pazar district, Tokat province.

==== The Herdsman and his Son ====
In a Turkish tale collected in Çukurova with the title Nahircı ile Oğlu or Naharcı ile Oğlu ("The Herdsman and his Son"), a poor herdsman named Mehmet Aga has no family, becomes sad and prays to Allah for a child for him. Suddenly, a donkey foal ("eşek sıpası") appears to him and states he has been given to Allah as answer to his prayers. The man agrees, and teaches the donkey foal he is herding the cattle of the village. He returns home and tells his wife about the donkey foal. Mehmet Aga's wife welcomes the animal as their son. The following day, Mehmet Aga goes to collect bread from the houses in the village, and the donkey foal accompanies him. To the local chieftain's surprise, he finds out that the donkey foal can talk. The donkey son speaks and talks to the children of the village, who flock to Mehmet Aga's house to listen to him. One time, a child suggests that Mehmet Aga marries his donkey foal off, but Mehmet Aga questions: to whom? They reply: to the Bey's daughter. Mehmet Aga goes to the Bey's house, sits at the "dünür daşı" (a stone or chair to announce one's marriage intentions) and mentions the possibility of marrying the Bey's daughter to his son, but his proposal falls on deaf ears. Mehmet Aga tells the donkey son about it, and he goes with the bag of bread to collected bread from the Bey's house. He also pays him no attention to the donkey. Lastly, Mehmet Aga goes to talk to the Bey again and announces that he intends to marry the donkey foal to Gul Hanım. The Bey asks for some suitor's tasks first: to provide forty camel loads of jewels and gold. Mehmet Aga returns to inform the donkey foal about it, and the donkey foal gives him a whip, for him to strike a rock, recite three 'Gulhüvallahu' and one 'Elham', summon an Arab servant and ask for the jewels and gold. It happens thus, and the Arab servant gives Mehmet Aga a bridle which he pulls. Next, the Bey asks for some mottled and white - the donkey foal sends Mehmet Aga to the same rock to summon the Arab again. Finally, the Bey asks for a palace to be built for his daughter - the donkey foal sends his adopted father to the Arab to request for the palace.

After fulfilling the Bey's requests, a shining palace appears before the Bey's house, to his surprise. He concedes defeat, and agrees to marry Gül Hanim to the donkey foal. After the forty slave girls leave the couple alone, the donkey foal breaks the silence and confesses that his bride is curious about him. She leaves the room, then returns: instead of the donkey foal, she finds a youth, handsome as the full moon. The now human donkey foal reveals his story: he is the son of the fairy king ("peri padishah"), and recited that there is no God but Allah, and Muhammad is His messenger; for this, his family banished him the form of an animal, then met the human Mehmet Aga. The fairy prince asks Gül Hanim not to reveal anything to anyone, lest his family's pursuer, an ifrit, captures him and takes him away from her. He returns to his donkeyskin disguise and goes to herd the cattle. Meanwhile, the Bey and his wife go to their daughter's house and find Gül Hanim living happily, to their surprise. Her aunt goes to talk to Gül Hanim, saying they were very worried about her wellbeing, but Gül Hanim assuages them, saying that the donkey foal is in fact a handsome youth. Suddenly, noise erupts in front of the house, and a voice, the fairy prince, admonishes his wife for breaking the trust, and she now has to search for him in iron boots, for the ifrit has come to take him away. He vanishes. Gül Hanim is paralyzed at first, but regains her bearings, dons the iron boots and goes after her husband in a male's disguise. She journeys as far as she can, and stops to rest by a flowing stream. She drinks some water and sees a man coming to her: it is the donkey foal, back to human form. He sees that the newcomer has worn out iron boots, and says she is in the land of the ifrits. He takes her to his house and gives her some food and drink, then warns that the ifrit may take her away from him if he discovers her there. Suddenly, the ifrit appears, senses the human scent of Gül Hanim, and accuses the fairy prince of working behind his back. At first, the fairy prince tries to deny it, but then confirms, saying that he will not let him have his human bride. The ifrit reiterates that he will take the human girl. However, the fairy prince tells Gül Hanim she has but to say a prayer, and he will say "âmin", and both will fly away. Gül Hanim says a prayer, the prince says "âmin", and both turn into doves, flying all the way back to their palace. They see Mehmet Aga herding the cattle, as he always does, and go to talk to the Bey. They hold a wedding celebration for forty days and forty nights.

=== Turkish Cyprus ===
==== The Padishah and his Daughters ====
In a Turkish Cypriot tale titled Padişah ve Kızları ("The Padishah and His Daughters"), a padishah convenes with his daughters and instructs them to shoot arrows at random among a crowd of people to choose their husbands. The eldest daughter's arrow strikes the son of the vizier's eldest son, the middle daughter's arrow strikes the head of the vizier's middle son, and the youngest daughter's arrow strikes the head of a donkey. Despite repeated attempts—three more times the youngest daughter's arrow hits the donkey—the padishah insists she try again. Resigned to her fate, the princess marries the donkey.

Soon after, the animal begins to speak and reveals that he is a "Green Angel" (yeşil melek in the original), warning her not to disclose his secret; if she does, she will be forced to wander in gold shoes and search for him on the Golden Mountain, the Silver Mountain, and the Cevahir Mountain until she finds him again.

Time passes, and the donkey sheds his disguise, transforming into a human youth who brings flowers to the princess. At the wedding of the eldest princess, the donkey husband—in his human form—appears as a mysterious guest and again presents flowers to the princess before departing. The same event occurs at the middle princess's wedding. Mocked by her sisters, the princess eventually reveals that her husband is the Green Angel, causing him to vanish. Recalling his earlier warning, the princess asks her father for a pair of gold shoes and embarks on a journey to find him.

Her quest leads her first to a stream near the Golden Mountain, where a maidservant fetching water with a golden jug informs her that the Green Angel is not there. She then proceeds to the Silver Mountain, where another maidservant drawing water with a silver jug also fails to see him. Finally, the princess reaches the Cevahir Mountain and notices that the soles of her shoes are worn out—a sign that the Green Angel is near.

The tale further explains that the Green Angel is the son of a dev (giantess) woman who lives on the Cevahir Mountain. The princess is eventually reunited with the Green Angel. Some days later, his dev mother orders the princess to sweep half of the house while leaving the other half unswept. After the princess departs, the Green Angel uses a broom to sweep one part of the house while deliberately neglecting the other, arousing the dev mother's suspicion that the princess had help. Next, the dev woman orders the princess to fill jars with her tears; although the princess cries, she can fill less than half a jar. In response, the Green Angel fills the jar with water and sprinkles in some salt.

Subsequently, the dev woman commands the princess to visit her sister and retrieve a box. Anticipating a trap, the Green Angel intercepts her and advises that she first pass through an open door, then exchange the fodder between two animals (substituting bones for a dog and straw for a donkey), drink three handfuls of water from a stream, eat an apple from a tree, and give a scarf to a woman who is cleaning an oven with her breasts. Finally, she must enter his aunt's house and steal the box from the table while the creature is distracted sharpening her teeth, then take the box and return without opening it.

The princess follows these instructions precisely, retrieves the box, and makes her way back, despite the dev aunt commanding the animals and landmarks to impede her progress. Meanwhile, the dev mother receives the box and prepares for her son’s wedding by placing candles on the princess’s hands and lighting them, intending that, once the candles melt, she and her sisters will devour the princess. In a desperate attempt to save her, the Green Angel twice asks the princess for a kiss; when she refuses, preferring death at the hands of his female relatives, he then instructs her to hold the candles in her place. This enables both to escape, while the false bride suffers the consequences of the melting candles and is devoured by the dev sisters.

Realizing they have consumed the wrong person, the dev family chases after the couple. To evade his mother, the Green Angel transforms the princess into an orchard and himself into a gardener. The dev mother encounters only the gardener and utters a curse that the princess will never bear children. Later, when the dev aunt pursues them, the Green Angel transforms the princess into a tree and himself into a seven-headed dragon (ejderha in the original). His dev aunt threatens the transformed pair, but the dragon attacks her, forcing her to flee. Ultimately, the princess and the Green Angel return to her kingdom and marry. In time, when the princess proves unable to bear children, the Green Angel summons his dev mother to help with the delivery, thereby breaking the curse imposed on his daughter-in-law.

==== Green Angel (Lefkosa) ====
In a Turkish Cypriot tale titled Yeşil Melek ("Green Angel"), set in a certain village, a king declares that it is time for his three daughters to marry. He takes them up a hill and has them throw balls onto the rooftops; whichever ball lands on a house determines the husband—the son who lives in that house. The eldest princess’s ball lands on the rooftop of a king’s house, and she marries his son. A wedding is celebrated for forty days and forty nights. Next, the middle princess casts her ball onto the vizier’s house and marries the vizier’s son. Finally, when the youngest princess throws her ball, it lands near a donkey’s head. After a second attempt yielding the same result, she resigns herself to fate and marries the donkey.

That night, the donkey transforms into a youth as handsome as the fourteenth moon and implores her to keep his secret, warning that if she reveals it, she will lose him. Some time later, a tournament is announced in the village in which every knight will compete. The transformed youth informs the princess that he will take part in the competition. During the tournament, a handsome and mysterious knight is admired for his prowess, while the youngest princess is mocked for her choice of husband. After enduring the ridicule, she declares that her husband is the mysterious knight. In response, he vanishes.

Determined to find him, the princess asks her father to prepare provisions for her journey and sets off in search of her husband. She passes by the White Mountain and the Blue Mountain until she reaches the Green Mountain, where a maidservant announces that she is fetching water for the Green Angel. The princess requests to be taken to him, but the maidservant warns that his mother is a man-eating creature. Undeterred, the princess reunites with her husband, who introduces her to his mother as his wife.

His mother then orders the princess to complete a series of tasks. First, she commands her to fill a vase with her tears; however, the Green Angel fills the vase with water and sprinkles salt, arousing his mother’s suspicion. Next, the creature orders her to both sweep and not sweep the house; the Green Angel takes a broom and instructs her on how to perform the task. For the third task, the princess is forced to eat bread meant for a dog and a cat, yet it does not diminish. Concluding that the task is impossible, the Green Angel tells his wife, and together they escape from his mother’s house.

On the road, the couple meets an old man and asks him to help them hide, but he insists that they plant some vegetables first. As the dev mother approaches, the Green Angel instructs the princess to slap him; upon doing so, he transforms into a serpent while the princess becomes a red “gabag.” The dev mother nears and declares that she wishes to eat the princess first. In response, the Green Angel asks his mother to allow himself to be eaten instead; when she opens her mouth, he, still in serpent form, bites her tongue. Released from his curse, the Green Angel returns with the princess to her kingdom, where they celebrate their marriage anew.

=== Caucasus Region ===
==== Rutul people ====
In a variant collected from the Rutul people, in Dagestan, titled Как ослик Ризван превратился в юношу ("How Donkey Rizvan Becomes a Youth"), a childless couple prays to God for a son, and the wife gives birth to a donkey. One day, the donkey son expresses his desire to marry the princess, and his human mother convinces the king to accept the proposal. However, the padishah orders the prospective son-in-law to complete a series of tasks. The donkey son fulfills these tasks and subsequently marries the princess.

On the wedding night, the donkey son reveals his true form to his human wife: he is a man named Rizvan beneath the animal skin. The widow then persuades the princess to hide her husband's donkey skin, keeping it out of his reach so that she can burn it. The princess complies, and as a result, her husband loses his donkey skin. He transforms into a bird and tells his wife that if she ever wishes to see him again, she must search for him in a distant kingdom.

The princess spends years searching for him until she reaches a fountain, where a slave woman is carrying water to Rizvan. The princess begs for a drink and accidentally drops her wedding ring into the jug. When the slave woman delivers the jug to Rizvan, he recognizes his wife’s ring and summons her. Reunited at last, they decide to escape from the castle in a Magic Flight sequence, pursued by a creature named Azhdaha.

While on the road, Rizvan and his wife ride on horses. Noticing their pursuers, they throw objects behind them to deter the chase: first, Rizvan throws a saddle-bag full of water that creates a sea between them, causing the Azhdaha to drown; next, he throws some salt behind them to form a mountain that deters his younger sister.

==== Armenia ====
In a 1979 article, researcher Suzanna A. Gullakian noted that the supernatural husband appears as a donkey in at least two Armenian tales related to tale type AT 425.

Scholars Isidor Levin and Uku Masing published an Armenian tale titled Herr Amir (Turkish: Bay Amir). In this tale, a lonely old couple complains that they have no one to care for them in their old age. One day, the old man opens the door and finds a young donkey ("Eselsjunges") in front of their balcony. The little donkey invites himself in and explains to the couple that he is actually a youth beneath the donkey skin. He proves his story by removing the skin to reveal his human form and then reverting to a donkey. Later, he asks his adoptive mother to request the hand of the king's daughter in marriage.

The king consents to the marriage but orders the suitor to complete several tasks. He must build a house that overshadows the king's palace, extend a carpet between the palace and the house lined with blooming trees to provide shade for the princess, and finally appear with an army of one hundred knights on one hundred white horses. The donkey-child advises his human mother to go to the garden and, under the name Herr Amir, request that each task be accomplished. Eventually, the king's daughter marries the little donkey. One day, she asks him what can be done about the skin; Herr Amir tells her that she may burn the donkey skin to transform him into a human, but warns that he will vanish and she will not see him again unless she walks with steel shoes and carries a steel cane. When the king's other daughters visit and comment that their husbands are better than hers, the princess, angered by their mockery, takes the donkey skin and burns it. Immediately, her husband appears to her sisters in human form, and at midnight, Herr Amir gives her one last kiss before vanishing.

The princess then asks her father for steel shoes and a steel cane and embarks on a quest to find him. Meanwhile, Herr Amir returns to his true parents and yearns for his human wife so intensely that he is consumed by fever. His sisters go to a nearby spring to fetch water to cool him down. After a long journey, the princess notices that her steel shoes are worn out and hopes that her husband is nearby. She sees two women drawing water in jars and inquires about the reason. The women explain that the water is for Herr Amir, who is burning with fever. The princess asks for a drink and accidentally drops her ring into one of the jars. When the women deliver the jugs to their brother, Herr Amir recognizes his wife's ring and instructs his sisters to bring the girl to the fountain.

Herr Amir finds his wife, and she lives with him under his parents' roof until one day his mother inquires about the woman he brought home. Dismissing her concerns, Herr Amir and his wife plan their escape. While on the road, as the couple is pursued by his family, they transform several times to deceive them: first into a mill (the princess) and a miller (Herr Amir), then into a garden (the princess) and a gardener (Herr Amir), and finally into a rose tree (the princess) and a snake coiled around its trunk (Herr Amir). Ultimately, Herr Amir's father ceases his pursuit and allows the couple to go, returning home. Herr Amir and the princess then return to her kingdom, celebrate a new wedding, and become king and queen.

== See also ==
- The Donkey (fairy tale)
- The Donkey's Head
- Grünkappe
- The Horse-Devil and the Witch
- The Princess Who Could Not Keep a Secret
- Sea-Horse (Syrian folktale)
- The Spotted Deer (Turkish folktale)
- Chötiktscha
