= The Snake-Prince Sleepy-Head =

Iranian folktale about a snake bridegroom

Folk tale
- Name: The Snake-Prince Sleepy-Head
- Aarne–Thompson grouping: ATU 425B, "Son of the Witch"
- Region: Kermani, Iran
- Published in: Persian Tales by Emily Lorimer and David Lockhart Robertson Lorimer (1919)
- Related: Cupid and Psyche; Grünkappe; Yasmin and the Serpent Prince; Sabzqaba

The Snake-Prince Sleepy-Head is an Iranian folktale published by Emily Lorimer and David Lockhart Robertson Lorimer in their collection Persian Tales, in 1919. It is related to the international cycle of the Animal as Bridegroom or The Search for the Lost Husband, in that a human princess marries a supernatural husband or man in animal form, loses him and has to seek him out.

According to scholarship, many variants of the cycle are reported to exist in Iran, and the usual form of the animal husband is that of a snake or serpent.

== Sources ==
The Lorimer couple sourced the tale from Kermānī. German scholar Ulrich Marzolph sourced it from Kermān.

== Translations ==
The tale was also translated into Italian as Il principe serpente and Mir Mast, il Principe Serpente, and into German as Der Schlangenprinz, and into Hungarian as A kígyóherceg meséje.

== Summary ==
In a kingdom, a king's wife and a wazīr's wife are expecting their respective children, and promise to marry their children to each other. The king's wife gives birth to a black serpent named Mir Mast or Khumar (Mīz Mast o Khumār, or "Prince Sleepy-Head"), and the vizir's wife to a girl they name Mèr-Nigā ("Eye of Grace"). They grow up together and, when they reach marriageable age, the king orders the wazīr to marry their children to each other. Out of fear for the monarch, the wazīr consents to Mer-Niga's marriage to the snake.

On the wedding night, the prince takes off the snakeskin and becomes a handsome youth, then wears back the skin in the morning. Time passes, the queen learns of her son's true nature, then talks to her daughter-in-law, asking her to destroy the snakeskin. Mer-Niga does as the queen suggested: the prince tells her she must burn the shed snakeskin in a special pyre, "made with the shell of an egg, the handle of a sweeping-brush, and the hair of a dog's tail", but warns her that if she does that, she will never see him again. Mer-Niga burns the snakeskin in the pyre; Miz Mast o Khumar appears and curses her to never see him again until she wears down seven pairs of iron shoes and seven paper cloaks, then vanishes.

Mer-Niga regrets her actions but cannot bear to be away from her husband. She does as instructed and walks for a long time, until she reaches a stream where a slave-girl is fetching water. The princess asks the slave-girl about her master and she answers: Prince Sleepy-Head, whom she is fetching water to, since the prince is marrying his aunt's daughter. Mer-Niga requests the girl to throw her ring into the jug for Prince Sleepy-Head. The slave-girl gets the ring inside the jug and takes it to her master. When Mir Mast or Khumar is washing his hands, the ring drops from the jug, which he recognizes. He then asks the slave-girl the meaning of the ring, and the slave-girl informs him about the wanderer by the stream. Mir Mast goes outside and meets his wife, but warns her about his aunt, so he will bring her in and pass her off as another slave-girl. He also gives Mer-Niga some strands of his hair to burn if she needs his help.

Mir Mast convinces his aunt to hire Mer Niga as her maid and his aunt soon sends her on difficult tasks: first, she receives a pearl-encrusted sweeping broom that she must use and not drop a single pearl. When Mer-Niga tries to sweep the floor, the pearls fall off, and she burns her husband's hair to summon his help. He performs the task for her, and she goes to inform his aunt, who suspects she had Mir Mast or Khumar's help. Next, Mer-Niga is ordered to sprinkle the floor with a colander, which she cannot do again and summons her husband to help her.

Thirdly, his aunt hides some insects inside a casket and gives it to Mer Niga, claiming it contains pearls, for her to deliver to "Such and Such a place", and gives her instructions: to place bones for a horse and straw for a dog, keep locked doors shut and open doors as such, avoid passing by a hollow of dirt and blood. Still on the way, Mer Niga opens the casket and hordes of insects crawl on her. She throws her husband's hair into the fire, he appears, collects the insects and locks them up in the box again, then advises his wife on how to proceed: she shall give a bone to a dog and straw to a horse; open a closed door and shut an open one; compliment a hollow full of dirt and blood by saying it contains honey and drop the casket there. Mer-Niga follows his instructions to the letter, drops the casket and rushes back, when a voice behind her commands the doors, the hollow and the animals to stop her, but her kind actions swayed them over to her side.

At last, the prince's aunt forces Mer Niga to hold candles on her fingers to illuminate her husband's bridal procession. Mer-Niga complains her fingers are burning, while Miz Mast or Khumar says that it is his heart that is. After the wedding, the Snake Prince advises his human wife to say goodbye to every object in the house before they escape, while he cuts off his cousin's head. Mer Niga and Miz Mast or Khumar escape from his aunt's house and take some objects with them: reeds, needle, salt and some seafoam. When they are on the road, a single object in the house, a one-pound weight, alerts his aunt of the couple's escape, and the creature and her husband, who are Divs, chase after them.

The divs go after the couple, who throw the objects behind them, with Miz Mast o Khumār invoking God's and the Prophet Sulémān's help, to hinder their pursuers: the reed becomes a reed-brake, the needle a grove of needles, the salt a salt-marsh and finally the seafoam a vast sea between them and the divs. On the other margin, the div couple ask their nephew how he crossed the sea, and Miz Mast o Khumar lies to them to simply step on a stone in the middle of the sea. The divs fall for his trick, sink to the bottom and drown. Mer-Niga and Miz Mast o Khumar return home and celebrate a new wedding.

== Analysis ==
=== Tale type ===
In his Catalogue of Persian Folktales, German scholar Ulrich Marzolph classified the tale as his type AaTh 425B, Der Tierbräutigam: Die böse Zauberin ("The Animal Bridegroom: The Evil Sorceress"). Marzolph's typing corresponds to type ATU 425B, "The Son of the Witch", of the international Aarne-Thompson-Uther Index. Type 425B is considered by scholarship to correspond to the ancient Graeco-Roman myth of Cupid and Psyche, that is, the supernatural husband's mother forces the heroine, her daughter-in-law, to perform difficult and impossible tasks for her.

=== Motifs ===
According to Swedish scholar Jan-Öjvind Swahn's study on Animal as Bridegroom tales, a characteristic motif that occurs in the "Indo-Persian" area is the heroine using a ring to signal her arrival to her husband, when she finds his location.

==== The heroine's tasks ====
Another motif that appears in the tale type is that the heroine must travel to another witch's house and fetch from there a box or casket she must not open. German folklorist Hans-Jörg Uther remarked that these motives ("the quest for the casket" and the visit to the second witch) are "the essential feature" of the subtype.

==== The heroes' magic flight ====
The heroine and her supernatural husband escape in a Magic Flight sequence, that is, the characters either throw magic objects to delay their pursuers, or change into other forms to deceive them. Although this episode is more characteristic of tale type ATU 313, "The Magic Flight", some variants of type ATU 425B also show it as a closing episode. German literary critic Walter Puchner argues that the motif attached itself to type 425B, as a Wandermotiv ("Wandering motif").

According to Marzolph's index, Iranian type 425B concludes with the episode the "Magic Flight": by throwing objects behind them, the heroes create magic obstacles, e.g., a pack of needles becomes a field of needles, salt creates a plain of salt, and the water creates a sea or a river.

== Variants ==
=== Iran ===
Folklorist Margaret Mills disagrees with Jan-Öjvind's assessment in regards to the distribution of variants of the tale type in Persian language. She stated that "in [her] experience" the tale was one of the "most performed" in that language. A similar observation was given by professor Mahomed-Nuri Osmanovich Osmanov: he listed 7 versions of the tale "Змеиный Царь" ("The Serpent Tsar"), some found, for instance, in Dezful and Kashmar. In addition, according to Inge Höpfner, Iran registers many ("vielen") variants of the cycle.

==== Mirza Mastu-Khumar and Bibi-Mehrnegar ====
In another tale translated by Osmanov as "Мирза Масту-Хумар и Биби-Мехрнегар" ("Mirza Mastu-Khumar and Bibi-Mehrnegar"), a padishah looks himself in the mirror and, upon noticing his first gray hairs, sighs that he does not have any heirs, and complains about it to his vizier. Later at night, a dervish fortunately knocks on the vizier's door with a pomegranate to the padishah's wife and an apple to the vizir's, as a birthing implement to cure their barrenness, for a son will be born to the padishah's wife, and a daughter to the vizier's. The vizier takes both fruits and, deciding to have a male heir, gives the pomegranate to his wife and the apple to the padishah. In time, the vizir's wife gives birth to a daughter they call Bibi-Mehrnegar, and the shah's to a black snake they name Mirza Mastu-Khumar. They arrange for a marriage between their children when they come of age. Mirza Mastu-Khumar takes off his snake skin at night and shows his human form to his wife. At her father-in-law's insistence, she asks her husband how to destroy the snakeskin: burn it with garlic and onion peels with a dash of salt. Bibi-MehrNegar follows his instructions, but loses her husband in the process: he tells her she must wear down seven pairs of iron shoes, seven iron dresses, seven iron staves and carry seven kanderun boxes with her, then vanishes.

Bibi-Mehrnegar follows his instructions and begins her journey, meets seven divs on her journey and gives each of them a box. Her last stop is by a spring, where she begs for a drink of water. She puts her ring inside the jug that is taken to her husband. Mirza Mastu-Khumar recognizes the ring and goes to meet his human wife by the spring, explaining they are in the land of divs and ghouls. In order to protect her, he turns her into a pin and meets his div family; after they promise not to harm the human girl, Mirza passes Bibi Mehr-Negar as a new servant. Mirza Mastu-Khumar gives her tufts of his hair for her to use in case she needs his help. Soon enough, his aunt forces the girl to do chores around the house: to sweep the floor with a beaded broom and not to lose any bead, and to water the yard with a sieve. Lastly, the div asks her to take a "dancing box" to the div's brother and to bring another box from him. On the way, she opens the div's box and dancers and musicians escape from the box and begin to dance and play instruments. She uses a tuft of hair to summon her husband, who helps her to close the box. He also warns her to go to the div's brother's house, open the closed doors and close the opened ones, give hay to a horse and a bone to a dog, compliment everything on the way, get the box and escape from there as quick as she can. She follows his instructions to the letter.

Some time later, his family forces Mirza Mastu-Khumar to marry another woman, and places Bibi-Mehrnegar as a torchbearer, by placing ten candles on her fingers; she complains her fingers are burning, and the prince says his heart is. That night, Mirza Mastu-Khumar kills his new bride and escapes with his true wife. His aunt follows them and they throw objects behind them to create magical obstacles: Mirza Mastu-Khumar calls upon the name of Shahmardan, Jam and Suleiman, and a reed becomes a thicket of reeds to block their pursuer's path, then a needle becomes a bush of needles, a grain of salt becomes a salt marsh, and lastly seafoam becomes a wide sea. Mirza Mastu-Khumar's relatives are stopped in their tracks by the sea and ask him how they can cross it; the man tells them to step on some stones on the water surface. His relatives fall for his trick and sink to the bottom of the sea. According to Osmanov and Iranian author Ahmad Shamlou, the tale was previously published in the "Пеяме ноу" ("Peyame Nou"), a Soviet-Iranian cultural journal, and Shamlou considered it to be the "Tehrani version" of the tale "Bibi Nagar and Mirza Ghast Khamar", which he collected from an Afghan source.

==== Enchanted Mirza and Beautiful Bibi ====
Tajik Iranist Anna Rozenfel'd translated an Iranian tale published by Fazl'ollah Mohtadi Sobhi in his compilation "افسانه‌های کهن" (Russian: "Афсаиехае кохан"; English: "Ancient Legends"). In this tale, titled "Очарованный Мирза и Прекрасная Биби" ("Enchanted Mirza and Beautiful Bibi"), a shah notices the gray hairs on his head and hid lack of heir, and complains about it to his vizier. Later at night, someone knocks on the vizier's door: a white-robed darvish, who has come to help the shah. The darvish takes out a pomegranate for the shah's wife to bear a son and an apple for the vizier's wife to bear a daughter, who are to be betrothed to each other. The vizier takes the darvish's gift, but keeps the pomegranate to himself and gives the apple to the padishah. Nine months later, a girl is born to the vizier's wife, whom they name Beautiful Bibi, and a black snake to the shah's queen, whom they call Enchanted Mirza. The pair grow up together and, when they come of age, the shah orders the vizier to marry them to each other.

On the wedding night, Enchanted Mirza takes off the snakeskin to become a handsome eighteen-year-old youth, then puts the serpentine disguise back again. Time passes; the shah learns his son takes off the snakeskin, and tells her she must assure his son does not turn back into a snake. thus, Bibi asks her husband how to destroy the snakeskin: he answers that it should be burnt with garlic and onions peels, with a bit of salt, but warns her she will never see him again if she does it. Despite his words, Bibi burns the snakeskin. Mirza finds her and admonishes her, saying she will never see him again, lest she walks with seven steel shoes and seven iron shoes, with an iron staff and taking seven boxes with her, then vanishes.

After seven days, Bibi puts on the metallic apparel and beings her long journey. She finds on the road seven divs, to whom she gives the seven boxes, and keeps walking until the steel shoes, iron dresses and iron cane are all worn out. At last, she reaches a fountain, where a dark maidservant is fetching water for Enchanted Mirza, who is to prepare for his marriage to his aunt's daughter. Bibi asks for some water to drink, and drops her ring inside it. The maidservant takes the water jug to Mirza to wash his hands, and the ring falls into his hands. Mirza recognizes the ring and is told about the stranger girl at the fountain. Mirza goes outside and reunites with his human wife. He warns her that they are in the land of divs and demons, and that his div family (seven brothers and aunt) will devour her if they know she is human, thus, he will pass her off as another servant. He casts a spell to turn her into a pin, then enters his aunt's house to make them promise not to harm their new servant, and introduces Bibi to them. Despite not wanting another servant, Mirza's div aunt takes the girl in, and he gives her human wife some of its hair to burn to summon his help.

Later, the div-aunt gives Bibi a broom with pearls and orders her to sweep the room and not lose any pearl. As soon as Bibi sweeps the floor, the pearls fall everywhere, so she summons Mirza and he collects the pearls for her. The next day, the div-aunt gives her a colander to water the ground. Again, she summons her husband for help. Thirdly, the creature gives Bibi the box of "Dance and Play" and orders her to go to her brother and trade it for the box of "Take and Show", and warns her to let the things on the way (animals and doors) exactly as she finds them. Bibi carries the box and, just as she begins her walk there, she opens it: musicians and dancers fly out of the box to dance and play. Bibi summons her husband, who locks everyone back into the box, then advises her how to proceed: exchange the fodder between two animals (straw for a horse, bone for a dog), close an open door and open a closed one, compliment a pool of dirty water by saying it contains honey, deliver the box and steal the other one. It happens thus, Bibi fetches the second box from the div-aunt's brother and rushes back, while a voice commands the animals, the doors and the pool to stop her, to no avail.

Lastly, at Mirza's wedding to his cousin, the div-aunt ties ten candles to Bibi's finger so she illuminates the ceremony. She cries out that her fingers are burning, and Mirza says that his heart is burning. After the wedding, Enchanted Mirza tells his wife to say goodbye to the animals and every object in the house, while he kills his cousin and places her head on her breast, then escapes with his human wife. However, Beautiful Bibi has forgotten about a weight in the house, which alerts the div-aunt the bride is dead and the pair escape with a reed, a needle, a bit of salt and seafoam. Thus, the divs go in pursuit of Mirza and Bibi. Noticing they are being pursued, Mirza throws objects behind them to create magic obstacles, invoking the name of Ali, Djemshid and Solomon: a reed becomes a thicket of reeds, a needle becomes a forest of needles, a salt becomes a salt marsh, and seafoam turns into a sea to separate them. On the other side of the sea, the div family asks how to cross the it, and Mirza says they just have to step on some stones on the water surface. The div-family falls for his trick and drowns. Mirza and Bibi return to their city, Mirza's enchantment broken, they celebrate a new wedding they live in peace and happiness.

==== The Serpent Tsar ====
In another Iranian variant, published by professor Osmanov with the title "Змеиный Царь" ("The Serpent Tsar"), a poor woodcutter is approached by a serpent, who asks him one of his daughter's hands in marriage. Only the youngest, named Mehrnegar, attends the serpent's request. The serpent comes to take her as an animal, but takes off its skin and becomes a handsome man, to her sisters' consternation and jealousy. Mehrnegar rejects the man at first, but he explains he is the serpent, born of a peri, and both leave for their new home. One day, Mehrnegar is visited by her sisters, who push her to ask her husband about the snakeskin. He answers her that the skin can be burnt in a bonfire with onion and garlic peels. The sisters overhear their conversation and, while the couple is asleep, they toss the skin in the fire. The Serpent Tsar wakes up and admonishes his wife. Mehrnegar begs him to forgive her, but he says he will become two pigeons she must try to capture; otherwise, Mehrnegar must wear a pair of iron shoes and walk with an iron cane until she finds a snake burrow. The girl fails in getting the birds, which escape. Mehrnegar dresses just as her husband instructed and goes on a journey; she passes by a herd of camels and a splendid garden with fruits, flowers and chirping birds – all belonging to her husband. She reaches a spring near a snake burrow and sees a servant girl coming to fetch water. She asks for a drink. The servant refuses and Mehrnegar curses the water to become pus and blood. The servant takes the water to her master, the Serpent Tsar, who sends the servant to the fountain to get clean water again. Mehrnegar gets her drink, and puts her ring on the jug. When the Serpent Tsar washes his hands with the water jug, he notices the ring. He goes back to the spring and brings his wife home. He explains to Mehrnegar that his mother is preparing his wedding to his cousin, and decides to protect his true wife by telling everyone she is an orphan in need of a job. The Serpent Tsar's mother forces Mehrnegar to give water to serpents with a sieve, and to carry a letter to her sister and trade it for scissors. The Serpent Tsar instructs his wife to compliment the objects on the way and to feed correctly the horse and the dog, get the scissors and leave as quick as possible. Finally, the Serpent Tsar's Mother places burning candles on Mehrnegar's hands, telling her to hold them until they go out. The Serpent Tsar and the false bride are led into their chambers, as Mehrnegar mourns her fate in the stables. Suddenly, her husband appears and convinces her to escape with him, saying he killed his second wife. Mehrnegar and the Serpent Tsar escape. His mother and family notice his absence and go after them. The couple escape by throwing needles, a handful of salt and a water skin, which transform into a forest, a mountain and a lake, to hinder the pursuit.

==== Shah Khasta Khumar ====
In a tale from Northeastern Iran with the title "شاهِ خِسته خُمار" ("Shah Khasta Khumar"), a sultan has a daughter named Mahnagar, who is still single, so, advised by his viziers, he sets a suitor test: a pole is stuck in the ground; whoever removes it shall marry the princess. Many try and fail, until one day a snake appears and removes the pole by wrapping its body around it. Mahnagar is given to the snake ("mâr", in the original), and she goes to live with the snake in its palace, crying all the way. The snake approaches her and asks if she is afraid of him; she replies she fears the snake will devour her. To assuage her fears, he makes her promise not to burn his snakeskin, and removes his snakeskin, showing his human form. Mahnagar feels calmer and happy that her husband is a normal man. They live as husband as wife for some time. A few days later, an old woman comes to their palace and suggests Mahnagar burns the snakeskin to keep him human forever. Mahnagar heeds the old woman's words, takes her husband's snakeskin and burns it. The snake youth appears to her and laments that she could not keep her promise, and says she will have to wear down seven pairs of iron shoes in questing for him, gives her his ring, then vanishes.

Mahnagar cries over her loss, then puts on the iron shoes and begins her journey through mountains, deserts and provinces, until, by the time her seventh pair is worn down, she reaches a city, the City of Snakes, where her husband, whom the story explains is named Shah Khasta Khumar, lives. She stops by a fountain to rest and sees a servant coming to fetch water. Mahnagar asks for a bit of water to drink and drops her husband's ring inside the jar. The servant then takes the jug to his master, Shah Khasta Khumar. He finds his ring in the jar and goes outside his house to retrieve his wife. They reunite, and Shah Khasta Khumar warns her about his parents, who will wish to kill her.

After he takes his wife home, his parents discover she is a human named Mahnagar, and plan to get rid of her. His mother conspires with her sister, and, one day, orders Mahnagar to go to her husband's aunt's house and fetch from there a tambourine. Before she departs, Shah Khasta Khumar intercepts her and advises her how to proceed: exchange the correct fodder for a dog and a camel, compliment a crooked wall by saying it looks straight, compliment a stream of muddy water by saying it is filled with clear water. Mahnagar follows his instructions, reaches her husband's aunt's house, takes the tambourine and rushes back through the same path. Shah Khasta Khumar's aunt commands the stream, the wall and the animals to stop her, but they remain still.

Finally, after Mahnagar brings back the tambourine, her mother-in-law is furious her plans failed. Realizing his human wife could be killed at any moment by his parents, Shah Khasta Khumar decides to escape with her. He takes some needles, a bit of salt, and a jug of water, and both flee the city of snakes. His parents chase after them with a cadre of snakes. Back to Shah Khasta Khumar and Mahnagar, he throws behind them the needles to injure the snakes, and the salt to hurt their wounds. Lastly, when the snakes are closing in on them, Shah Khasta Khumar drops the jug of water to create a wide sea between them. On the other side of the sea, his snake family tries to call for him, but the couple are far too distant at this point. They finally reach Mahnagar's father's kingdom, and remarry.

==== Khaft khomâr and Mehr-Negâr ====
Persian scholar Abolqasem Faqiri collected an Iranian tale from Fars province with the title "خفت خمار و مهری نگار" or Khaft khomâr and Mehr-Negâr. In this tale, a merchant wants to go on a trip, and asks his daughters which presents he can bring them. The youngest, named Mehr-Negâr, asks for a cluster of pearls. The merchant goes on a trip and finds his youngest's gift in a garden. He asks the owner of the garden if he can fetch them, and the owner, named Khaft khomâr, agrees, in exchange for the merchant's daughter in marriage. The merchant agrees, and they sign the marriage papers. The merchant brings the cluster to his daughter, and days later, a cadre of snakes come to fetch their master's bride. On the wedding night, Mehr-Negâr finds out that someone invisible is eating dinner with her. The snakes bid their master reveal himself to his bride, and he shows his true face: a handsome youth. He tells her to say her husband is a human being, and to keep his Jinn nature a secret. For the following weeks, Mehr-Negâr's mother and aunt visit her and insist to know her husband's identity, but she keeps replying he is human. Her aunt takes out a knife and threatens her niece to reveal the truth, which she does, out of fear for life. That same night, Khaft khomâr appears to her, knowing that she failed to keep his secret, and says she can find him again if she wears down seven pairs of iron shoes, then vanishes. Mehr-Negâr cries for his disappearance, but decides to look for him in iron shoes and with an iron cane. On wearing down six of the pairs, on the seventh she reaches a garden, and asks a passing black servant whose garden it is: Khaft khomâr. Mehr-Negâr asks for a drink of water and drops a ring inside the servant's jug, which he brings to his master. Khaft khomâr notices the ring and goes outside to meet his wife, then turns her into a handkerchief with a spell.

He enters his house and his mother can still sense a human smell. To protect her, he turns her into a needle, then a broom, but eventually turns back into human and introduces her as a servant who has come to work in his wedding preparations. However, Khaft khomâr's mother begins to hate this new servant, orders her on increasingly difficult tasks, like sweeping the desert and filling a water tank with a sieve, which her husband fulfills for her. One day, his mother orders her to go to her sister and fetch from there the "Qawwali box ("جعبه قوالی", in the original) of the Mutarabi" ("مطربی", in the original). Khaft khomâr intercepts his wife and advises her how to proceed: open every closed door and close all open ones, compliment a dog, compliment the thorns of a branch by saying it contains crystal needles, meet his aunt, get the box from his aunt and rush back. Mehr-Negâr follows her husband's instructions to the letter, gets the box and escapes, while his aunt commands the dog, the thorns, and the doors to stop her. At a safe distance, she opens the box and an army of people come out to play drums. Khaft khomâr appears to her and locks everyone inside the box, then accompanies her back to his mother's house. Seeing that her plans failed, Khaft khomâr's mother decides to destroy her human daughter-in-law during her son's wedding to his cousin. However, Khaft khomâr anticipates his mother's ploy and asks Mehr-Negâr to trade clothes with his cousin. His Div-mother and Div-aunt take the false Mehr-Negâr and devour her, but notice the deception and discover Khaft-khomâr has fled with his human wife. The pair goes after them. On the road, Khaft khomâr throws objects behind him to deter his mother and aunt: first, he drops some needles which become a field of them, hurting the duo of pursuers; next, he drops a portion of salt that becomes a sea of salt between him and his relatives. On the other side of the sea, his mother and aunt ask him how they can cross the body of water, and Khaft khomâr says they just have to step on the stone and reed. They follow his false advice and sink to the bottom of the sea, never to return.

==== Mehrinnagar and Sultan Mar ====
In an Iranian tale from Khorasan with the title "مهرین‌نگار و سلطان مار" ("Mehrinnagar and Sultan Mar"), an old man has three daughters, the youngest named Mehrinnagar and the most beautiful. He earns their living by gathering thorns and selling them. One day, he finds a large snake on his bundle of thorns and salutes the animal. The snake begins to talk and orders the man to give him one of his daughters. The man goes back home and tells his daughters the situation, saying that the snake will come on a certain date, when there is good weather. After hearing their father's tale, the elder two refuse to marry the snake, while the youngest agrees. On the assigned day, a retinue of snakes wait by the man's door for Mehrinnagar, who comes outside and sits on one of the snakes' back to be taken to her new home. After a while, the snakes reach a garden and bring the girl to their master inside a palace, the large snake waiting for her in a room. Suddenly, the large snake takes off his snakeskin to become a handsome youth, who warns his wife not to tell anyone, not even her parents, about this.

Time passes, and Mehrinnagar's mother and sisters pay her a visit. Seeing that their cadette is living a nice life, the sisters begin to feel envy and ask Mehrinnagar about her husband. Pushed by their words, she tells them about the youth behind the snakeskin, and they, even her mother, suggest she burns it. Later, when Sultan Mar comes home, Mehrinnagar tells him she will burn his snakeskin. He pleads with her not to do it, but, if she wants to go with it, he will turn into a bird and circle room three times, and she must catch him before he flies away. If she fails to do it, she will have to wear iron garments (dress and shoes), walk with an iron cane until they all wear down. She will also pass by herds of sheep, cows and camels which belong to him, until she finally reaches a spring, where a slave will be fetching water for him. She will curse the water for become pus and blood, and, after the slave fetches another jug, she will drop her ring inside it, which will serve to remind Sultan Mar his wife is near.

Ignoring his words of prophecy, she burns the snakeskin, and, to her surprise, it happens as he predicted: Sultan Mar turns into a bird and circles the room three times, then flies away. Mehrinnagar cannot catch him, and cries over her grave mistake. She then commissions iron garments from a blacksmith and begins her journey. Just as her husband predicted, she passes by his herds of sheep, cows and camels, and, feeling hunger, asks for some food, by the herdsmen forbid it, since the herds belong to their master, Sultan Mar. Finally, she reaches a spring with a tree nearby, and sees a slave fetching water with a jug. Mehrinnagar asks the slave for a drink of water, but the slave denies her. In anger, the girl curses the water to become pus and blood. The slave brings the water to her master, Sultan Mar, who notices that the water changed into pus and blood, and realizes his wife is nearby. He then sends the slave back to the spring and orders her to fulfill the wanderer's request. The slave goes back to the spring and gives Mehrinnagar some water to drink, and she secretly drops her ring inside the jug. The next time, the ring falls on his hands when he washes his hands, and he goes to retrieve his wife. After they meet outside, Sultan Mar explains he is a prince, kidnapped and raised by the demons, and is able to alternate between serpent and human forms.

He brings her home to his mother and introduces her to his mother as a servant. For the next days, Sultan Mar's mother forces her on hard tasks: first, she is to weep all over the floor and wash it with her eyebrows – Sultan Mar chants a spell to summon a gust of wind and a cloud of rain to fulfill the task for her. Next, the demon mother orders Mehrinnagar to go to her sister, get a sieve from there and use it to fill jugs with water. Warned by her husband, Mehrinnagar goes to his aunt's house, takes the sieve and rushes back to fill the jugs with water. Lastly, his mother betrothes him to his cousin, and she orders Mehrinnagar to hold ten candles on her fingers and illuminate her son's chamber for the whole night. Unable to avoid it, she stands and holds the candles, but curls in a corner of his room. Her husband appears to her and, uttering a magical word, creates an invisible glove around her fingers to protect her. As his bride enters the wedding chambers, Sultan Mar bemoans that his heart and soul are burning, while Mehrinnagar states that it is her fingers that are. After his bride falls asleep, Sultan Mar talks to his wife they need to escape, and tells her to get a jar, a sack of salt, and three packs of needles (one with thin, another with thick, and third with sewing needles). Then, she will have to pass by a crumbling wall and compliment it, by a crooked tree and compliment it, exchange the fodder of two animals (grass for a camel, bone for a dog), and at the end of the path, he will come and take her.

It happens as he described: while Sultan Mar kills his cousin and hides her head in a chest, Mehrinnagar passes by the strange path and tells the wall, the tree and the animals her husband's mother and aunt are after her. By treating them with kindness, Mehrinnagar is allowed to pass and finds her husband at the end of the path, and both escape, him warning her not to look back. She obeys and runs close to her husband, as his relatives chase after them. To deter the pursuit: Sultan Mar tosses the packs of needles behind them, first the thin ones, then the thick ones, and finally the sewing needles (juwaldaz). Failing that, he throws behind the salt to create a sea of salt, and finally the jug of water, which creates a sea behind them. Thinking they can cross the sea, Sultan Mar's mother and aunt try to wade through and drown. Free at last, Sultan Mar and Mehrinnagar return to their palace.

==== Mahdi Gulnar Bibi Banagar ====
In an Iranian tale collected from a 70-year-old informant from Nur, Mazandaran province, with the title "مهدی گلنار بی‌بی بنگار" ("Mahdi Gulnar Bibi Banagar"), a man lives with his three daughters. One day, he is ready to go to the Hajj, when his daughters ask him to buy them something. On the way, he realizes he has no money with him, when suddenly a voice tells him it can give him money, in exchange for one of the man's daughters. The man agrees, takes the money, and buys the gifts for his daughters. Back home, returned from the Hajj, the voice echoes again and asks if the man forgot about his promise. The man then explains the situation to his three daughters, and his youngest agrees to marry the owner of the voice. Soon, the mysterious voice reveals itself: it is a snake's. The snake asks for a bowl to be brought to him, turns into a handsome youth and takes the girl with him no another place. The human snake, named Mahdi, makes her promise to keep his secret, lest – as he advises – she has to seek him out by wearing out seven pairs of iron shoes, iron garments and an iron cane. The next day, a neighbouring woman pays Bibi a visit and asks her how the girl married a snake. Bibi answers her husband is not a snake, but a handsome youth. On saying this, her husband, Mahdi, does not return home. Bibi waits for seven years, and, after this time, decides to search for her missing husband by donning the iron garments, as he predicted. She makes her way through the desert and passes by a flock of sheep, whose shepherd explains belongs to Mahdi as a gift for Gulnar Bibi Banagar.

After passing through herds of cows, camels and horses, she finally reaches a village and finds a woman fetching water in a jug, which she learns is for Mahdi. Bibi asks for some to drink and drops a ring inside the jug, which is brought to Mahdi. The man finds the ring and discovers his wife is nearby, then goes to the spring to meet her. He explains there are Dios in the village, turns her into a pin and pockets her, then returns home. He meets his mother and makes her promise to take care of Bibi Banagar. Some time later, Mahdi's mother gives Bibi Banagar a bucket and orders her to bring it to her sister. Bibi Banagar leaves Mahdi's home and walks the path to his aunt's house: she finds two doors, one open which she closes and another closed which she opens. A voice tells her to leave them be, but the doors begin to talk and say they have been in that state for years. Next, Bibi Banagar finds a cow with bones in front of it and grass in front of a dog. The same voice from before tries to stop the girl, but she exchanges the fodders (grass for the cow and bones for the dog), and continues on her way. Thirdly, she finds a rundown wall which she restores by placing some bricks on it, despite the voice's warnings, meets her husband's aunt and leaves the bucket there, then makes a run back to Mahdi's house, where his mother realizes the girl is still alive.

Mahdi meets his wife again, who is safe and sound. Soon, the villagers gather for a wedding and plan to destroy the couple. Mahdi warns his wife that, if the villagers try anything against them, she is to throw a pack of pins to the ground to deter them. Just as Mahdi predicted, the villagers approach his house and try to attack the couple, but Bibi Banagar throws the pins to the ground to create an obstacle, then they make a run for their home.

==== Heydar Mar and Bibi Negar ====
In an Iranian tale collected by researcher Hamidreza Khaza'ei from a 78-year-old informant named Soghari Golshani, from Damanjan village, in Nishabur, Khorasan with the title "حیدر مار و بی بی نگار" ("Heydar Mar and Bibi Negar"), a woodcutter lives with a wife and three daughters, cuts firewood to sell and feeds his family with the money. One day, he goes to gather more firewood and notices the bundle is strangely heavy: a snake named Heydar Mar is there. The woodcutter asks the animal to leave, and the reptile requests one of his daughters. The man returns home and explains the situation to his daughters, asking which will go with the snake: the elder two refuse, save for the youngest, Bibi Negar. The next day, the man tries to avoid the snake by going on another path. Still, the snake appears again and questions the man who chose to be with him. The snake gets his answers, and tells the man wind will blow at his house, then some rain will pour down, and he will come to fetch his bride. It happens thus and Bibi Nagar's parents prepare her for her bridegroom's coming. Some snakes appear and escort her to a garden with a large mansion in the middle. The tale then explains Heydar Mar is not snake, but a handsome youth. Some time later, Bibi Negar's aunt pays her a visit and advises her to destroy her husband's snakeskin, for one as beautiful as Bibi cannot be seen married to a snake. They try to burn the snakeskin in the oven, but the disguise does not burn. Thus, Bibi Negar asks her husband how to destroy it; he slaps her face so hard and she cries. He apologizes, and reveals: with garlic and onion skins, but warns her against it, lest she will have to look for him with a metal cane and in iron shoes, until both are worn out in her hands. Despite the warning, one day, when Heydar Mar is at the bath, Bibi Negar and her aunt gather some garlic and onion skins, take the snakeskin and burn it.

For days, weeks, and a month, Bibi Negar does not hear from her husband, who has vanished after burning his snakeskin. She mourns for him so much one of her eyes cries tears and the other blood, and decides to find a blacksmith to commission the steel cane and iron shoes. She begins a long journey for days, passing by people threshing grains, a flock of sheep and a herd of camels – all belonging to Heydar Mar as a gift for her. Losing track of time, she reaches a place with a tree and a stream of water nearby. Suddenly, a maidservant appears with a jug to draw water. Bibi Negar asks for some water to drink, but the maidservant tells the water is for her master, Heydar Mar, to wash his hands. Bibi Negar curses the water to turn to blood when it falls on his hands, and it happens thus. Heydar Mar asks his servant about the situation, and learns of the stranger at the stream, so he sends the servant to draw more water. The next time, the maidservant fulfills Bibi Negar's request, who drops her ring inside the jug. The maidservant then brings the jug for her master, Heydar Mar, and he notices his wife's ring, which he last saw seven years ago. The maidservant tells Heydar Mar about the stranger at the fountain, and he bids her to bring her in. Heydar Mar is set to be married to his cousin, and his grandmother and aunt will bring the bride the following day. The creatures talk to each other about the girl next to Heydar Mar, and the aunt tells her to send the girl to fetch scissors from her house, where she will devour the human girl. The next day, Heydar Mar's mother orders Bibi Negar to go to her sister's house and fetch some scissors.

Heydar Mar intercepts his human wife and advises her on how to proceed: she is to exchange the fodder between two animals (bones for a dog, straw for a camel), drink from a pond of bitter water and say it is sweet water, rest by a broken wall and compliment the shade it provides, enter his aunt's house, steal the scissors from behind the door and escape, since the creature will be sharpening her teeth to devour Bibi Negar. The girl follows his instructions to the letter, takes the scissors, and runs back. Heydar Mar's aunt walks to the roof to spy on the escaping girl and orders the wall, the pond and the animals to stop her, to no avail. Bibi Negar returns with the scissors. Earlier on the wedding date, due to her success, Heydar Mar's female relatives prepare their next trap: they will burn Bibi Negar's hands until she dies that same night. Heydar Mar overhears their plan, then goes to his human wife, recites a prayer and kisses her hands. During the wedding ceremony, Bibi Negar carries lit candles on her hands ahead of the wedding procession and complains her hands are burning, while Heydar Mar says his heart and soul are burning. Bibi Nagar's hands keep burning during the bride's henna session, then the couple retires to the Hajla. At midnight, Heydar Mar kills his cousin, then hangs her body from the roof of the house, with a basin of water underneath it, then fetches some juvaldooz, some salt, a bar of soap and a bucket of water and escapes with his human wife Bibi Nagar.

The next morning, Heydar Mar's aunt goes to check on the wedding couple, and hears something dripping, which she believes to be water. Some time later, after the sun rises, she goes to check for their tardiness and finds the bride has been killed, her blood dropping from her body. In a rage, Heydar Mar's female relatives rush after the escaping couple. When they are approaching Heydar Mar and Bibi, Heydar Mar releases the juvaldooz (juwaldaz, large sewing needles), which form a mountain of juvaldooz to hurt their feet; the rock salt to create a mountain of salt to hurt their legs; and the soap to create a mountain of soap to hinder her. Finally, as his aunt is approaching him and his wife, Heydar Mar throws the bucket of water, which creates a sea between them. On the other side of the water body, Heydar Mar's aunt asks how he crossed the water, and Heydar Mar lies that he put on some rocks and waded through. His aunts follows his suggestions and sinks to the bottom of the sea. Heydar Mar and Bibi Negar return and celebrate a new wedding.

==== Other tales ====
Another variant was published in Spanish language with the title Bibi Negar, la Amada Buena, y Heydar Mar, el marido serpiente ("Bibi Negar, the good spouse, and Heydar Mar, the serpent husband"). Its collectors classified the tale as types 312A (man promises daughter to animal under threat of death), 425A (marriage to animal husband, his subsequent disappearance and his wife's search) and 428 (girl as servant to an ogre and assigned dangerous tasks). (Note: Swahn considered type 428 as a fragment of his type 425A, "Cupid and Psyche" (tasks for the mother-in-law), and suggested a reclassification. Accordingly, German folklorist Hans-Jörg Uther revised the international classification system and subsumed previous type 428 under the new type ATU 425B, "Son of the Witch".)

In a Khorasan Turkic tale collected from a source in Bojnurd in 1973 and published in 1977, a poor man lives with his three beautiful daughters, and earns his living by gathering and selling bushes. One day, when he has finished a bundle, he tries to carry it, but it is too heavy. When he goes to check it, he finds a snake in the bushes. He tries to shoo it away, but the snake begins to talk and demands the man's elder daughter in marriage, otherwise it will devour him. The man is let go, returns home and tells his elder daughter about the situation. She refuses to marry the snake. The man returns to the snake the next day, and the animal, after the elder's refusal, tells the man to ask the middle daughter. She also refuses. The third day, the snake demands the man asks the third daughter, and she accepts. The man returns to inform the snake, which is delighted at the situation, and tells the man to come home and wait for three winds that will announce he is coming to get his bride: first, a red, then a white one, and lastly a black. The man returns home and waits for the winds to come. It happens thus, and he prepares his youngest daughter to go with a large retinue with snakes on horses that has come to fetch her. He lets his daughter go, and she departs. Some time later, the man goes to visit his daughter, worried about her, and finds their house filled with jewels, and his son-in-law, instead of a snake, has turned into a handsome man. The man returns home and his elder daughters pester him to know about their cadette. He is a bit worried about the snake biting the girls, but the duo ignore his warnings and go to their brother-in-law's house. Once there, they spot the snake coming, taking off the snakeskin to become a handsome youth, making ablutions, then returning to the snake disguise and slithering to the desert. The girls meet their sister and convince her to ask her husband how to destroy the snakeskin. When her snake husband returns home, she asks him about it; in retaliation, he slaps her, admonishing that if she does it, she will have to seek him with an iron rod and a pair of shoes. After assuaging her husband she does not plan to do so, he reveals it: burn the skin in garlic and onion peels. The elder sisters overhear it, then go to the market to buy the ingredients. That night, after he doffs the snakeskin one more time, the elder sister burn the snakeskin; the snake husband (whom the story calls "Salman") turns into a dove and flies away. The girl, named Mehrinigar, commissions the iron rod and shoes from a blacksmith and goes in search for him. She passes by a herd of chickens and a herd of cattle, which the shepherds tell belong to her husband Salman as her brideprice. Mehrinigar finally reaches a fountain and sees a girl fetching water. Mehrinigar asks for some, but the girl says it is for her brother Salman and denies her. Mehrinigar then curses the water to become blood. When Salman tries to use the water, he sees the blood and sends his sister back to the fountain, telling her to give the wanderer some water. His orders are carried out, and Mehrinigar, while drinking the water, drops her ring into it. Salman finds the ring and asks his sister to bring the wanderer inside. The couple reunite and spend some time together. Later, Salman takes his wife to a hut in a vineyard, where she finds a strange bottle: Salman explains it contains the life of his mother. Mehrinigar drops the bottle to the floor, it breaks and a storm bursts, causing them to fall asleep. When they wake, they start to live together. Professor Sultan Tulu translated the tale to Turkish, titling it Yaşlı Adam ve Üç Kızı ("The Old Man and His Three Daughters"), and classified it as type ATh 425, sourcing it from an informant named Mahmud Mohtaseb.

In another Khorasan Turkic tale, the father of three sisters remarries, and his new wife mistreats the girls. One day, they leave home and rest under a tree to talk about their marriage plans. The youngest sister declares that she will marry whomever fate sends her. A male peri that was on the tree overhears this and sends a man to ask for the girl, then takes her to the peri. The peri puts on a snakeskin disguise and goes to meet the girl, scaring off the elder sisters, but not his intended bride. The youngest girl faces the snake and the animal, in return, shows her his true face: the male peri. They spend the nights together, he puts on the snakeskin in the morning and slithers away, only to return at night. One day, the peri warns the girl not to tell anything to her elder sisters, but to lie that he is only a snake, lest he vanishes and she has to find him with an iron cane and in iron shoes. Her elder sisters appear to her and warn her that she may be bitten, for he is but a snake. The girl then reveals he is human under the snakeskin, and the peri returns to his own homeland. The girl waits for him to come back for the next nights, but he does not. After two years, remembering the peri's warnings and the ring he gave her, she buys an iron staff and a pair of iron shoes and goes after him. She passes by some people plowing the fields, then by a camel herd, and lastly by a ship docked in a port – all of it belonging to Hocahast (or Xoĵaxast), as a gift to his wife Mehrinigar. After passing the ship, she reaches a spring, where a maidservant is fetching water for her master, Hocahast. The peri master, inside the nearby house, smells a human scent on the servant, and sends her back fetch more water. Mehrinigar finds the maidservant crying and helps her with the water, then secretly drops her ring in the jug. Inside the house, Hocahast finds the ring and, realizing his wife is there, goes to meet her by the spring. They reunite, but Hocahast warns her his mother is a "giant" that will devour her, and turns his wife into a pin with a prayer. He then returns inside. His giantess mother appears and smells something human. Hocahast asks his mother to swear on Prophet Suleiman before he introduces Mehrinigar to her. The giantess makes the vow, and Hocahast turns his wife back into human form. After a while, the giantess decides to send Mehrinigar to her sister. Before she goes there, Hocahast intercepts her and advises her on how to proceed: she will find a crumbling wall which she is to compliment and sit nearby it; then, she is to exchange the fodder for two animals (bone for a dog, grass for a camel), open a closed door and close an open one, and finally, when meeting his aunt, she is to circle her as a demonstration of respect. Mehrinigar does as instructed: she exchanges the animals' fodder, opens the doors, compliments the wall, and finds his aunt. Hocahast's aunt notices she must have been told what to do, but, regardless, orders her to take some things and bring to her sister. Mehrinigar fulfills the order and rushes back to her mother-in-law's house. Hocahast's aunt then orders the objects and animals to stop her, but they remain still. Hocahast's mother is satisfied with her daughter-in-law's efforts, and tells Hocahast to take her for a stroll amidst the vineyard, but they must not enter the hut. In the vineyard, Mehrinigar sees the hut and wants to know what it is inside. She opens the door and finds a bottle inside; she tries to grab it, but it slips her hands and crashes on the floor. Hocahast's mother dies instantly, for the bottle contained her "life". Now free, Mehrinigar and Hocahast live in happiness. Professor Sultan Tulu translated the tale to Turkish language, titling it Üç kızkardeş ("Three Sisters"), and classified it as type ATh 425.

== See also ==
- The Green Serpent
- Grünkappe
- Khastakhumar and Bibinagar
- Yasmin and the Serpent Prince
- The Princess Who Could Not Keep a Secret
- Sultan Mar (Iranian play by Bahram Beyzai)
- Sabzqaba
