= Prince Wolf =

Danish fairy tale

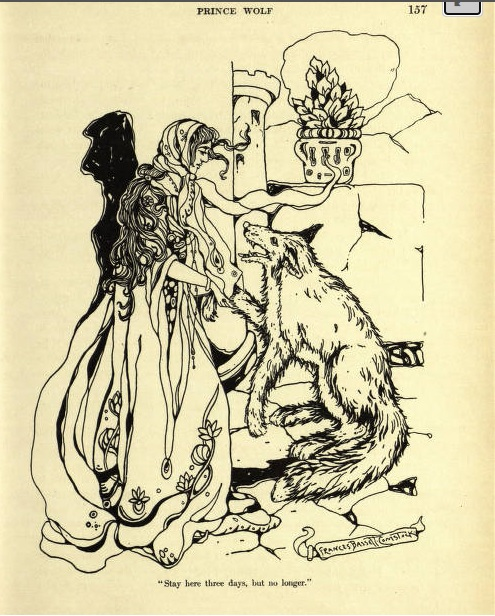
- The princess and the Prince Wolf

Folk tale
- Name: Prince Wolf
- Also known as: Ulv Kongesøn
- Aarne–Thompson grouping: ATU 425B, "The Son of the Witch"
- Region: Denmark
- Related: Cupid and Psyche (ATU 425B)

Prince Wolf (Danish: Ulv Kongesøn) is a Danish fairy tale collected by Svend Grundtvig in his book Danske Folkeaeventyr, about a human princess that marries a man under an animal curse to be a wolf, breaks the secret about his identity and has to search for him, eventually finding him at the house of the witch that cursed him, where she is forced to perform difficult tasks for her.

The tale is related to the international cycle of the Animal as Bridegroom or The Search for the Lost Husband, in that a heroine marries a supernatural husband in animal shape, loses him, and has to seek him out. It is also classified in the international Aarne-Thompson-Uther Index as tale type 425B, "Son of the Witch", thus distantly related to the Graeco-Roman myth of Cupid and Psyche. Tales with similar motifs and elements are found across Denmark and Scandinavia (Norway, Sweden and Iceland).

== Summary ==
A princess finds a louse on her hair. She shows it to her father and decides to feed it until it grows large enough. The louse dies and the king orders its leather to be cut off and extended. He decides to use it as part of a riddle to give the princess's hand in marriage to anyone who can correctly guess the type of skin.

A wolf comes to the court and guesses it right, demanding the princess as wife, as promised by the king. The king consents in giving his daughter and the wolf comes to fetch her. Wolf and princess walk about a bit, then she climbs onto the wolf's back and they run until they reach a splendid castle. The wolf confirms it is their castle, but warns that no light should be used inside at night. The princess notices that the wolf is only such during the day, but someone human comes at night.

After two years, the princess gives birth to a boy, but he is taken from them and given to the husband's sisters. One day, she wants to visit her family. Her wolf husband consents, but insists that, when she returns, she must not bring anything from home with her. They visit his wife's parents for three days, and her mother advises her daughter to use a knife to confirm that her husband is a human, and not a troll.

She brings the knife from home and puts it on his bedstand at night. He hurts his leg, and moans, confirming he is human, after all. The prince complains to his wife, but she tells him she won't repeat it.

Some time passes, she gives birth to a daughter after four years, and the girl is also taken from her. They visit the princess's parents again. Her mother, this time, convinces the princess to use some light source to see his true face, when he comes at night to the bridal bed. So she gives her a tinder-box and some taper. The princess returns to her husband's palace and lies that she did not bring anything with her. Later that night, she illuminates the bedroom and glimpses at her husband, in human form.

He despairs at his wife's betrayal and reveals he is a human prince who was cursed by a troll witch for refusing to marry her daughter. He turns into a wolf again and vanishes into the night. The princess now has to seek him out. On her way, she visits her sisters-in-law, and recognizes her children, but does not linger and resumes her quest. She finally reaches a glass mountain where the witch resided, but it is so slippery. The princess is advised by an old man to find the nearest ironsmith to shod her shoes.

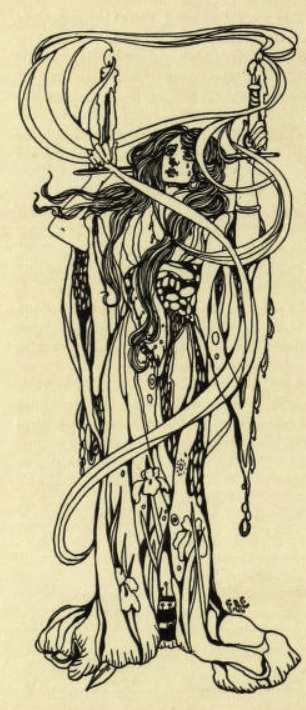
The princess holds the candles at the wedding between her husband, Prince Wolf, and the witch's daughter. Illustration for Prince Wolf from a 1909 book.

After she finally climbs the glass mountain, she employs herself as a kitchen maid in the witch's castle, and is ordered to perform difficult tasks. The witch orders the princess to beat a piece of white flannel until it turns black. She takes it to the stream and the old man offers his help in exchange for her affections. She refuses and remains loyal to the wolf prince. Despite the refusal, the old man uses his stick to beat the white shirt into a black color. Seeing the impossible feat, the troll witch orders her to beat it back into a white color, which she does with the old man's help.

Next, the princess is tasked with going to Hebbenfeld to fetch a jewel box from the witch's sister and bring it to her daughter's wedding. On the way, she cries that she does not know the way to Hebbenfeld, and a young man offers his help in exchange for her affections. She thanks his offer, but says she is still loyal to her husband. The young man points her to Hebbenfeld, and instructs her to only ask for the box, and refuse any offer of food from the witch.

She does as told and gets the box. The princess is offered a calf's foot by the witch's sister, but hides it in her bosom. She leaves the house and, on her way back, wants to take a peek inside the box. She opens it and a little bird flies away. She laments that there were no jewels inside, but the young man appears and uses his magic to enchant the calf's foot to return to the witch's house and get the jewels.

Finally, the princess is forced to carry torches during Prince Wolf's wedding to the troll's daughter, after being enchanted to stay still as the torches slowly melt on her hands. After the Prince and the troll daughter pass through the door, the princess cries out for her beloved to help her. Prince Wolf seizes the torches from his true wife's hands and puts them into the hands of the troll witch and her daughter. The torches melt away in their hands and they, as well as the entire castle, are consumed in the fire. Once the princess and her husband escape, they take their children on the journey back home and live happily.

== Translations ==
The tale was translated into English by Jane Mulley as Prince Wolf, and published in the Journal of American Folk-Lore and as part of Fairy Tales From Afar; into German as Wolf Königssohn, and into Italian as Il Principe Lupo.

== Analysis ==
=== Tale type ===
Swedish folklorist Carl Wilhelm von Sydow noted that the tale begins with the episode of (former) tale type AaTh 621, "The Louse-Skin", also used in Italian fairy tale The Flea, from the Pentamerone. Folklore scholar Stith Thompson remarked that this tale type often served as introduction to other types, including AaTh 425B. In addition, Swedish scholar Waldemar Liungman also remarked that type AaTh 621 appears as introduction to tales from the Cupid and Psyche cycle of stories in "almost all the Northern region".

The tale has also been compared to the Roman myth of Cupid and Psyche and other stories about animal husbands that appear as an animal during the day, but assume human form at night, like Norwegian East of the Sun and West of the Moon. The human wife is advised by her parents to break the husband's prohibition and to see his true face at night. She disobeys the husband's wishes and he disappears. The heroine journeys to another kingdom where a witch lives (sometimes identified as her mother-in-law), where she works as her servant. One of the tasks forced upon the heroine is to go to the house of another witch, located in Hell itself, to get fiddlers, musicians, girl carders, ballads, or some bridal ornament (as in some variants from Denmark).

=== Motifs ===
Researcher Annamaria Zesi suggests that the episode of the louse skin appears in tales found around the Baltic Sea.

The motif of the separation of the heroine from her children is located by scholarship across Celtic and Germanic speaking areas.

In his study about Cupid and Psyche and other "animal bridegroom" tales, scholar Jan-Öjvind Swahn surmised that the animal husband appears as a dog in Germanic and Celtic areas. In addition, to him, the wolf as the animal husband developed in Germanic areas.

== Variants ==
=== Denmark ===
==== Prince Wolf (Kristensen) ====
Danish folklorist Evald Tang Kristensen another Danish tale with the title Ulv Kongesøn. In this tale, the king finds a louse in his hair, fattens it with almond milk and kills it later, using its skin as part of a riddle: whoever guesses it right shall have the princess for wife. A wolf prince appears, deciphers the riddle and gains the princess as his wife. The wolf prince takes her on his back to the foot of a mountain, and he tells the princess to find work in the nearby castle of an evil queen as a servant. The princess enters the castle and becomes a maidservant to the queen, and she is forced to perform tasks for the latter: first, she is given a black dress which she must wash white. The princess tries to wash it white, but it keeps getting blacker. She cries over the impossibility of the task, until the wolf appears to her to help her. She fulfills the first task, and the queen orders her to wash the now white dress back to black. With the wolf prince's help, she fulfills the task. Next, the queen orders the princess to go to Hell to fetch three fiddlers ("tre Spillemænd", in the original). The wolf prince takes the girl to the entrance of Hell and gives her some grease to use on two doors, two brooms to give to two sweepers, and two rags to give to two people cleaning an oven. He also advises her not to eat anything the witch in Hell may offer her. The princess follows the instructions and enters the witch's house in Hell, where she is offered a sausage. The princess hides the sausage in her clothes to trick the witch, gets the box of fiddlers and escapes from the witch's house. To stop her, the witch commands the people and the doors to deter her, to no avail. At a safe distance, the princess opens the box and the fiddlers spring out of it. The wolf prince appears and helps her close them inside the box. Back at the castle, the queen places a candle on the princess's hand for her to hold during the night, as the prince and the queen's daughter marry. The prince, however, asks his bride to hold the candle, so the princess can rest a bit. Finally, the wolf prince decides to flee the queen's castle with the human princess, and they run away from the queen's army by shapeshifting into two cherry trees, then two ducks in a pond. The queen tries to grab the two birds, and drowns in the pond.

==== The Hound's Bride (Kristensen) ====
Kristensen collected another Danish variant from informant Kristen Nielsen, from Egsgård mark, in Ringive sogn, near Vejle. In this tale, titled Hundebruden ("The Hound's Bride"), a couple has a daughter who does not want to marry. Just to spite her parents, she says she wants to marry a dog, and so it happens: a white dog appears at their door and asks for the girl as bride. The parents agree and the dog takes the girl to a little hut in the woods. He explains the hut is theirs, but she cannot light any light at night. Despite living with the dog, she begins to miss her family, and the dog agrees to let her visit her family on the holidays, with a caveat: she is to listen only to her father, not to her mother. During the second visit to her family, the mother suggests she spies on her husband when he sleeps at night. After the third visit, the girl lights up a candle at night and sees a handsome man on bed beside her. A drop of wax falls on his body and injures him. He wakes up with a startle and sees his wife betrayed him, since he is a prince, cursed by a troll woman. The prince says he will need to go to Bloksbjærg, turns back to a dog and rushes through the woods. His wife follows him. At a point of her journey, she sees a light in the distance and reaches a house. A kind old woman takes her in. She explains they can wait for a hailstorm to pass, since the old woman controls the hail. After the hailstorm passes, she gives the girl a pair of shoes and directs her to her sister, who controls the mist and the fog. The second sister takes the girl in and directs her to a third sister, who controls the heat. After passing by the three old women, the girl reaches Bloksbjærg and finds job as the troll woman's servant. After a few days, the troll woman orders the girl to wash a white spool of thread in the river and make it black. A rooster appears to her and offer its help in exchange for using a term of endearment with him. The girl thanks the help, but declines the rooster's offer, opting to stay faithful to her lost husband. The rooster washes the thread and scratches its claws to turn it black. The witch then orders her to wash it white again. Some time later, the troll woman orders the girl to go to the troll's sister and get a jewelry box for her daughter's wedding. The rooster gives the girl some seeds and advises her to throw them to the troll's sister's guardians (a tiger and a lion), get the box and do not open it, and refuse to eat anything while in her house. After tricking the troll's sister that she ate a calf's foot, the girl takes the jewelry box and opens it in the way; the jewels escape from the box, but the rooster enchants the calf's foot to bring them back. Finally, the troll woman organizes her daughter's wedding and puts an enchanted candle on the girl's fingers, so that she cannot put out the fire until it has consumed her. She then sees that the troll's daughter's bridegroom is the dog prince, in human form. She cries out to him to help her. The prince takes the candle from the girl's hands and throws it at the troll bride. In the confusion, the prince and the girl escape and visit the kind old women's huts, only to find they have died, so they bury them out of respect.

==== The Little White Dog ====
In another Danish tale collected by Svend Grundtvig, Den lille hvide hund ("The Little White Dog"), a merchant looks for red ribbons as a present for his daughter, but finds none anywhere, until a little white dog offers some to him, in exchange for the first thing that greets the man upon his return. To his shock, it is his own daughter, who must now go with the little white dog. The girl and the white dog live as husband and wife, him becoming a man at night and remaining a dog during day, on the condition that she must never light any source of light in their castle. She gives birth to three sons. She knows a man comes at night to the bridal bed and, disobeying his orders, lights a candle to see him. Three drops of wax fall on his shirt and he awakes. The husband says they must separate and she can only look at their children, not play with them. She finds her sons and plays with them, once again disobeying her husband. He appears and tells her to seek employment with the old witch. After some time, the witch tells her she is making preparations for her wedding, and orders her to get some fiddlers in a box, by going to hell and asking her sister for the box. The white dog appears to his wife and instructs her: she must tie a loose log on a bridge; place a gate back on its two hinges; turn over an empty barrel for a dog, enter the witch's sister's house and refuse any drink and food. The girl gets the box from the witch, and flees from the same path she made, the witch's sister commanding her servants to stop her, but they stay their hand for the girl's kind actions. At a distance, the girl becomes curious and opens it, letting the fiddlers escape to a nearby tree. The dog prince appears to her and helps her get everyone back inside the box. Next, the girl is made to wash woollen blankets, then the wax spots on her husband's shirt. Seeing that the woman fulfilled all her tasks, the witch explodes and the dog prince appears with their children. The tale was republished in 1970 with its classification: AT 425B. The tale was translated into English as The White Dog and published by Ruth Bryan Owen in 1939, albeit removing the part about the heroine's children.

==== Min Hjærtens Ven ====
Evald Kristensen collected a Danish tale titled Min Hjærtens Ven ("Friend of My Heart"): a girl marries a man who comes at night and whose face she does not know. The girl's mother advises her to light a candle to see her husband more clearly. She follows her mother advice and light a candle on her husband; he becomes a dog and rushes through the door. The girl follows him through the woods, to no avail. She finds the house of three long-nosed old woman, who guide her to a distant farm, where she finds work for an old troll-woman. The girl is tasked with difficult chores: the second task is to wash a piece of black wool white, then to go to Hekkenfeld and get a box of jewels. A little white dog offers to help her in every task, so long as she calls him "Min Hjærtens Ven". The girl declines his offer, because she opted to remain loyal to her lost husband. At any rate, the dog advises her on how to get to Hekkenfeld: he gives her two sticks - to give to two women she will meet on the way - and two loaves of bread, for two dogs, and tells her to knock on a door and ask it to open up; then to dip her finger in a basin of blood next to two men; enter the troll-woman's house at Hekkenfeld, refuse any food she offers (a calf's foot), get the jewelry box and escape. The girl follows the instructions to the letter and escapes with the box, despite the troll-woman commanding the two men, the door, the two dogs and the two women to stop her. At a safe distance, the girl opens the box and the jewels run away back to Hekkenfeld, but the little dog enchants the calf's foot to bring them back. Lastly, the troll-woman announces her daughter's wedding to the girl's human husband, and the girl is forced to hold candles near the bridal bed for the whole night. The girl suffers the pain of their burning, but the little dog offers to help her if she calls him "Min Hjærtens Ven". She finally relents and the little dog reveals he is her husband. He takes the candles and throws at the troll-bride, then to her troll-mother, destroying them.

==== The Black Lame Hound ====
Author J. P. Kuhre collected a tale from an informant named Charlotte Kofoed, in Yppernegaard, Nyker, in the Bornholm dialect, in 1930. In the tale, titled Dænj swårta halta Hunj, transcripted to Danish as Den sorte, halte Hund ("The Black Lame Hound"), a man has three daughters. One day, he has to go on a journey, and asks his daughters what he can bring them: the elder asks for a 'Kjaûl', the middle one for a 'Sjall' (a shawl), and the youngest for a fine embroidered 'Puda' (cushion). The man goes on his journey and finds presents for his elder two, but cannot seem to find the cushion for his youngest, until he finds a fine house with a hound lying in the garden with the cushion. The man makes a deal with the hound to have the cushion for his daughter Maria. He returns home and brings presents for his daughters. One day, the lame black hound appears at home and demands Maria as payment for the cushion. The lame hound fetches Maria and takes her to a castle, where they begin to live as husband and wife. Some time later, Maria's sisters are getting married, and the lame hound allows her to pay them a visit. During the wedding, she is convinced by her sisters to look at the lame dog when he comes at night to their bed. She goes home to the dog's castle and kindles a light: she finds a man on her bed. Feeling betrayed, he runs away. She waits for him for two nights, but, since he does not return, abandons the castle and goes to look for work elsewhere. She finds a house in the distance and goes towards it. She smears some grease on the creaking doors, gives some bread she found to two emaciated dogs, and tears up pieces of her dress to give to two young women cleaning up an oven. A witch named Kjælinjen takes Maria in. Her first task is to wash a yarn white as snow so that it becomes black. Maria goes to a nearby riverbank to wash it and it only becomes whiter. The lame hound appears to her and helps her fulfill the task. The witch suspects Maria had help, but gives her a black yarn which she is to wash white. Maria returns to the riverbank and tries to wash it white, but cannot do so. The lame hound appears to her and helps her, then warns her the witch will repay Maria by giving her a poisoned 'Pølsa' (a sausage), which she is to hide in her clothes and toss in a pit of garbage. Maria returns to Kjælinjen and is given the sausage, which she tries to hide under the seat and throw it near the bedpost, but Kjælinjen summons the sausage and it answers her. The third time, Maria puts the sausage under her arm and manages to trick the witch. Kjælinjen then directs her to garbage heap, where Maria tosses the sausage and makes a run out of the Kjælinjen's compound. Kjælinjen commands the women at the oven, the dogs and the gates to stop her, but they stay their hand due to Maria's previous actions. Still, Kjælinjen manages to grab Maria and brings her back, then announces that the human lame black hound is to be married to her daughter, and orders Maria to hold torches to illuminate the wedding couple. It happens thus, and Maria cries out in fear. During the night, the human lame black hound takes the torches out of Maria's hands and places them in the Kjælinjen's daughter, who burns to ashes. The next day, Kjælinjen goes to bring breakfast for the wedding couple, goes to sweep the ashes and notices Maria next to the lame hound instead of her daughter. Thus, the witch bursts apart in anger and creates many flints. The human lame hound, who is a prince, summons a carriage with a small bell and takes Maria to his castle, where they live together. In his commentaries to the tale, folklorist Hans Ellekilde noted that the narrator seemed to confuse the witch whom the heroine works for with the witch's sister, the Lady in Hell, while, "in Danish tradition", both characters appear independently.

==== My Heart's Most Beloved ====
In a Danish tale titled Min hjertens allerkærste, collected in 1855 translated to German as Mein Herzallerliebster ("My Heart's Most Beloved"), a man is ready to deliver a cargo of turf in the city and promises to bring cakes for his children. However, he cannot sell his cargo, and forgets about his promise and leaves the city in his anger. Eventually, he remembers the promise and buys cakes for his children, and reaches a large castle. He finds some apples on a tree and decides to pluck them. He pockets many and goes to leave, when a black poodle blocks his path and demands to know what the man is doing in his garden. The poodle then asks the man to bring the animal whoever meets the man the first thing in the morning when he returns home. The man thinks that his own hound will meet him, and makes a promise. However, he returns home and his eldest daughter greets him. The man laments the fact, and explains the situation to her. The girl decides to fulfill her father's vow, despite her mother and her brothers' opposition, and accompanies him to the black poodle's castle. The dog promises her father she will have want of nothing, and will be treated with food and clothes. He calls her "Herzallerliebster".

One day, the girl asks the dog how much has passed since her arrival, and he tells her that she has been living with him for twenty years, and in the meantime her mother died and her father remarried a hag of a woman. The dog allows her to visit her family in a carriage, and bids her not listen to whatever her mother says, but her father does. The girl returns home and is greeted with a large party, since they thought she has become the devil's servant since her departure. The girl reveals they do not have any lights at the dog's castle, so the stepmother gives her some for her to use in their castle. The girl returns home and tells the dog she invited her family for a visit. The dog is happy for her return, but says that, while her family is in his castle, he will turn into a little bird and perch in the garden, so she has to make sure her stepmother does not see him. While her family is there, her stepmother sees the bird and breaks one of its legs, then the whole family leave. The little bird flies to their bed and turns into a dog. The girl wants to see if her dog companion is alright and lights up a lantern. A drop of oil drips on the dog's injured leg, causing him pain. The dod wakes up and orders the girl to fetch whatever gold and silver she can and leave. It happens thus, and the castle vanishes, leaving only a meadow. The dog is also missing, and his voice tells her they can never see each other in this world.

The girl promises to find him and search even in the ends of the world, so she wanders off. She reaches the forest hut of a large-nosed old woman who welcomes her. The witch tries to discern her husband's location through the coffee ground, with no luck, so she sends her to her larger-nosed sister and gives the girl a wand. The girl reaches the second witch's hut, who divines the dog husband is on land, so she sends the girl to her sister some two hundred miles ahead. Lastly, the girl reaches the third witch's hut, who has the largest nose of the three. The girl pretends to be a maidservant and works for her: she is given a large tuft of white wool for her to wash it black in fifteen minutes at the beach. Try as she might, the wool only becomes whiter, to her distress. Suddenly, a man appears to her and offers her help if she calls him "Herzallerliebster". The girl refuses his offer, but he helps her anyway and the black wool turns white. The girl delivers the wool to the witch, who suspects the girl had help. Some days later, the witch gives the girl the same amount of white wool, this time to wash it black.

Thirdly, the witch sends the girl to Hell to bring back some bridal jewels for the wedding. The girls walks on the beach and the water rises up to her mouth and nostrils, when she sees the helpful youth from before. The youth offers his help if she calls him her beloved, but she refuses his advances, since she had lost a beloved once. Still, the youth helps her in crossing the beach and advises her how to proceed: she is to walk towards Hell. She follows his advice: she tumbles barrels of meat to two lions, avoids the attacks of geese, chickens and ducks and tumbles a ton of oats and barley to feed them; meets two people threshing grains and points them to two hanging flails, and gives some tools for a pair of girls cleaning up an oven with her hands. She finally reaches Hell and meets an old woman who gives her a piece of bread and a calf's head to eat. While the woman is away, the girl hides the calf under the chair to trick the woman, then is given the box with the bridal jewels. As soon as the girl leaves, the woman commands the calf's head to stop her, but it says it cannot do so, since it is under the chair. The old woman then calls out for her servants to pay attention since the girl is passing by them, but her servants let the girl through. For this the old woman in Hell bursts in anger, lifts off, then falls on the ground and explodes in many flints.

Back to the girl, she escapes Hell with the box. At a distance, she decides to take a peek inside the box and lifts the lid a little: the bridal jewel fly off the box and back to Hell. The girl sits downcast, when the same youth appears to help her. He offers to help her if she calls him her beloved, but she declines him yet again, for she lost one beloved once. Still, the youth recovers the jewels for her. The girl returns home with the box intact and the nosed witch is surprised at her success. The witch arranges her wedding and orders the girl to hold a light to illuminate the occasion while the guests dance (troldene in the Danish text, Kobolds in the German translation). However, the girl will serve as living torch with her fingers and her own body. The fire from the light goes down to her fingers and she cries out in fear for her helper to come and become her beloved. The youth appears at once; he makes a sign of the cross, which banishes the dancing Kobolds, while the old woman enters the grave she dug for the girl. The tale is part of Svend Grundtvig's manuscriptural collection, and was first collected in 1855, by teacher Knud Sorensen from Jelling, in eastern Jutland.

=== Europe ===
==== Sweden ====
Swedish folktale collectors George Stephens and Gunnar Olof Hyltén-Cavallius reported a tale from Northwestern Finland that begins with the louseskin riddle. The animal husband is a snake ("orm") who marries the princess after guessing it right. The orm becomes a man at night and the princess burns his animal skin, prompting his disappearance. The princess goes after him and meets an old woman that gives her a ring, a pillow and two pieces of ham. Eventually, the princess finds work in a royal farmstead and a troll witch orders her to do chores for her: first, she has to sweep a green turf until it becomes white as snow; then, she is to go to the troll witch's sister to "listen to stories" ("sagor"). To perform the first task, the princess gives the prince the old woman's ring. On the second task, the prince advises her to use the pillow to stop two gates from crushing her, and to give the ham to two dogs.

In a tale collected by Swedish author Eva Wigström from Ystad, Skåne, with the title Den svarte, halte hunden ("The Black Lame Dog"), a man loses his way in the woods and cannot find his way home, until he sees a black lame dog that offers to help him, in exchange for the first thing that greets the man on his way back. The man goes home and his daughter greets him. The man consents to let his daughter go with the lame dog, who takes her to a beautiful castle in the woods and forbids lighting any candle at night. The girl notices that the lame dog must be a cursed prince, since someone appears at night in their bed. One day, missing her parents, the girl returns home and her mother tells her to use a blunt knife at night to see if her husband is a man or a monster. The girl obeys her mother and sticks the blunt knife in the man's leg. The man cries out in pain and admonishes his wife that, had she trusted him, his curse would have been lifted after some time. The castle then disappears and the man is taken by the troll-princess to her castle. The girl follows after him and reaches the troll-princess castle, where she works as her servant. As a first task, she is to wash a black wool white. A man appears to her and offers his help, in exchange for the girl becoming his fiancée. The girl declines the help, but the man helps her anyway. The next task is for the girl to use a sieve and take water from a stream and take it to the witches' castle. The third task is for the girl to go to Hell and get wedding songs for the troll-princess's daughter's wedding with the prince. The mysterious man advises her: she is to cross a bridge barefoot; give oats to geese; give ploughs to two men, oil door hinges, enter the troll's house in Hell, refuse to eat the food offered (a sausage), get the songs (a book) and escape. The girl follows the instructions to the letter and escapes with a book. At a safe distance, the girl opens the book and the pages fly to the trees. The same mysterious man comes to help her again. Finally, the girl is made to be a maid of honor to the prince's marriage to the troll-princess's daughter, by holding candles during the ceremony. After the couple enter the bridal chamber, the human girl tosses the candle at the troll-princess's daughter, burning her, and escapes with the prince in a "Magic Flight" sequence. The witch's servants go after them, but the fleeing couple turn into objects to trick their pursuers. Lastly, the human couple creates a lake that the troll princess tries to drink and bursts. The human girl and prince live happily.

In a tale originally collected by Swedish scholar Waldemar Liungman and translated into Hungarian as A zacskóból kiszabadult és visszaparancsolt nóták ("The Songs that escaped from a bag and were returned to it"), a poor girl lives with a lame dog as her only companion. The lame dog takes off his skin and becomes a man at night, and asks the girl to never look at him at night. However, she lights a lamp that night and sees that the man is a handsome youth. He wakes up and admonishes her that his curse would have been over soon, had she not betrayed his trust, and now she has to work for the witch who cast the curse on him. She goes to the witch, who forces her to do impossible tasks: to turn a pile of white yarn into black, and a pile of black yarn into white; and to clean the witch's stables. She despairs at her situation at first, but a handsome stranger offers his help in exchange for her becoming the man's beloved. The girl accepts the help, but turns down his proposal, opting to stay true to the lame dog. The third task is to go to the witch's aunt and bring songs for a wedding that is to take place. The handsome stranger appears and advises her on how to proceed: drink milk from a cow and hang the cheese on its horns; shear a goat's horns; take some loaves of bread off of an oven; cross a bridge barefoot; throw the loaves of bread to three dogs; help two women grind in the courtyard; accept the aunt's food (a calf's foot), but do not eat it; take the bag of wedding songs and escape. She does all that and takes the bag of wedding songs with her. The songs begin to sound even louder, which entices the girl's curiosity; she opens the bag and snakes, frogs and toads leap out of it and crawl into the grass. The stranger summons them back to the bag. The wedding happens: the stranger who helped her is the bridegroom. Later, after the wedding, the stranger assumes his true form, tells the girl he is the lame dog and bids her take with them a few pine cones, some grains of sand and some drops of water, for they will escape that night. The pair chooses two horses from the stable and rides away from the witch, who learns the youth and girl have escaped and follows them with her army. The pair throws the objects to delay them, and the last object (the drops of water) become so vast a lake the witch and her cohorts try to drink it and burst. The youth is disenchanted and marries the girl.

Finnish folklorist Oskar Hackman summarized some Finnish-Swedish tales. In one variant from Inga, a king meets a tomten during a hunt, and has to promise to give him the first thing that greets him at the castle gates. The king's middle daughter meets him. He tries to trick the tomten with his other daughters, but eventually lets his middle daughter go with the tomten. The tomten and the princess go to his house and live as husband and wife, but they live in the dark, to hide the fact that he becomes a man at night. She eventually gives birth three times to their children, who are taken from her as soon as they are born. She visits her sisters on the occasion of their weddings, and is given a flint by her mother after the second wedding. The princess goes back home and lights up the flint; she sees her husband is a handsome man. The flint, however, buns down their house and they become separated. The princess wanders until she finds a sorceress's hut and is invited in. She is given food by the sorceress, but hides it in her clothing. The sorceress then gives two pieces of cloth, one black to wash it white and one white to wash it black. The tomten helps her. Next, the princess works for a blacksmith for seven years, then climbs up a mountain and meets her husband there. He gives her bread, oil and whips, then explains she is to give bread for dogs, to use the oil to grease the hinges of a gate, and the whips for two men threshing grain. She follows his instructions. Suddenly, a voice commands the dogs, the gate and the men to kill the princess, but due to her kind deeds, she is left unscathed.

==== Iceland ====
German philologist Adeline Rittershaus summarized an Icelandic tale found in a manuscript in Landesbibliothek, which she titled Der schwarze Hund ("The Black Dog"). In this tale, originally titled Hundurinn Svartur, a king with three daughters has to go to war, but before he departs, he asks what his daughters want as a comeback gift. The two elders want a golden chair and a golden dress, while the youngest, Ingebjörg, wants a golden apple. He loses his way into a thick forest and arrives at a garden where the golden apples are. He spends some time in the nearby castle and, when it is time for him to leave, he takes the apple and a big black dog stops his exit. The dog demands the king's youngest daughter in return. Ingebjörg marries the black dog and lives in his enchanted castle, where he becomes a man during the night. She gives birth three times, but an old midwife takes the children. The black dog asks his wife if she wants to see their children, and she says yes. The black dog accepts, but warns that she must not overstay her visit. She visits her two older children in two other castles, but on the third child she stays a bit longer, and the black dog disappears. Ingebjörg runs through the forest and reaches a giantess's house. The giantess agrees to take her in, but the princess must first wash a black sheep into white and a white one into black. A mysterious man helps her. The next task is to go to giantess's sister and take a bag full of living birds. At the end of the tale, the princess finds the black dog and takes him to the giantess. The dog attacks the monster and changes at last back into human form.

==== Norway ====
Authors and folktale collectors Peter Christen Asbjørnsen and Jørgen Moe summarized a Norwegian tale from Ringerike with the title Skrubben og Kongsdatteren ("The Wolf and the King's Daughter"). In this tale, a king is on a hunt in the forest and meets a wolf ('Skrubben'), who wishes to bet with the monarch: if the king wins, he shall get a tree in his garden that shines like the Sun. The king wins and gets the tree. In a second meeting with the wolf, the king loses, and has to forfeit his daughter to the wolf. The wolf goes to the king's castle and fetches the girl for himself in a carriage, and they settle in a routine, with him coming to her bed at night in human form. Later, the princess gets an invitation to her father's wedding, which the wolf husband cannot attend, but allows his wife to go. During the wedding, the princess's new stepmother suggests she lights a candle at night to better see her husband. The princess does that and sees the prince in human form, but he turns into a black horse and run away to a inaccessible Glass Mountain. The princess goes after him and gains a pair of metal boots from a blacksmith to climb the mountain. Atop the mountain, she finds work for a Huldren: first, the princess has to make a barn for Huldren. While she is preparing dung for the barn, the black horse appears to her and offers his help in exchange for being called the princess's Ven ('friend'). Next, the princess has to grind groats, but the groats become very large and make the task difficult for her. The black horse helps her again. Thirdly, the Huldren sends the princess to the Huldren's sister to get a "Brudemøsse". The black horse intercepts her and tells her she must not eat any bread in the Huldren's sister's house, and, after a while, the woman will present her three boxes, one red, one blue and one black, and the princess must choose the red one. The princess goes to the house and is offered bread, which she hides under her clothes near her belly to trick the witch, and gets the red box. On the road back to the Huldren's house, she takes a peek inside the red box and accidentally releases its contents. The black horse comes and locks the contents inside the red box. Finally, the Huldren forces the princess to hold a light source near the Huldren and the prince's bed the whole night. While holding the lightsource, the princess's arms begin to burn and she shouts at the black horse to help her, calling him her "Ven". On uttering the words, the black horse turns into a "Holy Prince". Ørnulf Hodne's The Types of the Norwegian Folktale classified the tale as types 425 and 480.

Norwegian folklorist Johannes Skar collected a tale from a source in Setesdal with the title Skrubbesoga ("Wolf's Tale"). In this story, a man and a woman have a daughter. When the couple go to church, they leave their daughter at home, and she goes to the forest, when a wolf appears to her. The animal captures her and rushes to a farm, where they have dinner in a lavish room. After the meal, the wolf tells her that the girl cannot light a candle at night, and that he is a wolf by day and human by night, and must stay so for seven years. They live together for years, and she bears him three children, who are, however, taken from her. Five years later, the girl is allowed to visit her parents. They learn that their daughter is alive and living with a wolf or a man whose face she has never seen. She mentions her promise to the wolf, and her mother says she needs to light a candle, but her father opposes this notion. Despite his objections, the girl's mother gives her a candle for her to use at night. She returns to the farm and lights up the candle to see the face of her husband: a handsome youth. However, a drop of wax falls on his body, he wakes up and admonishes his wife. He turns into a wolf, and she pleads for another chance to help him: he replies that he will take her to his three sisters, where their children are, and his wife is not to overstay in their houses. The girl agrees and passes by the houses of her three sisters-in-law, where, despite their grievance over her betrayal, let her see her children, and gains a pair of scissors, a tablecloth, and a magic needle. Still in the third house, missing her children so much, she goes to embrace her child, once again breaking the wolf's orders, who departs without his wife to a steep hill. The girl goes after him and commissions a pair of metal claws from a blacksmith to climb the hill, until she reaches the house of a "Gjygri", where she finds work as their servant. The gjygri then forces the girl on tasks: first, the girl is to clean a stable of manure, but each time she tries to clean it, the stables fill out with more dung. The prince appears to her and offers to help her if she calls him her beloved. The girl denies his offer, but he helps her anyway. Next, she is to use a riddle to fetch milk for the gjygri. The prince appears again, repeats his proposition and helps the girl. Lastly, the girl is to go down a hill and fetch "bridal silver" ("bruresylvet", in the original) for the gjygri's wedding to the prince. The girl goes down the hill and finds a box. On the way back, she peers into the box and snakes, toads and mice spring out of it. She tries to bring the animals back into the box, to no avail, until the prince appears to her and makes the same proposition. The girl at last relents, calls him her beloved and goes to embrace him. With this, the gjygri explodes in anger. The prince and the girl take their children and go back to his father to celebrate their wedding. Ørnulf Hodne's The Types of the Norwegian Folktale classified the tale as type 425.

In a tale collected from teller Olav Eivindsson Austad in Setesdal with the title The Tale about the Wolf, a couple has a beautiful daughter. While they are at church, she leaves the house to fetch more firewood and is taken by a wolf to be his wife. Three years they live as husband and wife, and she bears him three children taken from her by the wolf. One day, the wolf consents to let her visit her parents, but to listen to her father, not her mother. The girl tells that by night he was a man, and her mother suggests the girl light a candle to better see him. That night, she lights the bedroom and see his true face: a handsome man, and a drop of tallow drops on his body. Feeling betrayed, he tells her he was under a curse and that he must leave. The wolf agrees to take the girl on his back as he departs on his journey. They pass by three big farms belonging to his three sisters (three old women), who are also taking care of their children. In each, the girl is warned by the wolf not to take anything their children may give her, but the sister-in-law insists she takes it: a cloth, a purse and self-cutting scissors. The girl gives the cloth and the purse to two people in need, who direct her to a mountain, where the wolf has gone to. Climbing the mountain, she meets a family of trolls and her husband (now in human form), and offers her services. The human girl agrees to do her chores if she can sleep by the wolf's side. Her first chore is to wash white wool into black. She goes to the stream, and a man appears with an offer to help. The human girl refuses, but she manages to wash the white wool black and the black wool white again. For two nights, the human girl tries to wake her husband up, but he remains fast asleep. On the third time, the human girl trades her scissors for one night and manages to talk to her husband. They plan to get rid of the ogress by cutting off a barely strung bridge as soon as she walks on it. The human pair cuts off the rope's bridge and the ogress falls to her death. The girl and her husband marry and get their children. The tale was originally titled Soga om skrubben ("Story about the wolf"), and is classified in Ørnulf Hodne's The Types of the Norwegian Folktale as type 425.

==== Estonia ====
In Estonian variants, the heroine's father promises her to an animal husband (a dog, a wolf, a bear), or she is destined by fate to be his bride. Either way, the heroine marries the animal, who discards his animal disguise at night. She breaks the taboo on him and he vanishes. The heroine follows her husband into Hell, where she is made to perform tasks for the devil (Vanapagan), including going to the devil's sister. Estonian scholarship, however, indexes this narrative sequence under type ATU 425A, Koer peigmeheks ("The Dog as Bridegroom").

In a Seto tale collected by folklorist Ello Kirss Säärits from teller Paraskevja Prants with the title Must pini, translated to Estonian as Must koer (English: "Black Dog"), an old couple has three unmarried daughters. One night, the woman tells the girls the dog cannot eat at their table, so the youngest goes to give some bones to the animal. Suddenly, a black dog appears and takes the girl to a house in the lake, where the girl is forced to perform tasks: first, she is to wash white wool black. She goes to the stream and cannot fulfill the task, when the black dog appears to her and asks for a kiss; she refuses him at first, then relents, and the dog then dives the wool into the stream. Next, she is to wash the black wool back to white. Again, the black dog asks for a kiss, she gives it to him, and the animal dives the black wool in the water to turn it white. On the third day, the girl is ordered to go to the village; the black dog intercepts her and advises her how to proceed: take some bread with her to throw to some dogs, carry a whip and use it to shoo away some snakes, and give a hook to an old man. The girl begins her journey and gives the bread to some dogs, whips some snakes away from her and gives a hook to an old man, then enters a house in the village. The girl is given a living snake as a meal during her stay there, but on the first day, she hides the snake under the table and on the second day under her chair; her host asks where the food is, and the food reveals its location. On the third day, the girl throws the snake through the window to fool her hosts. At last, she leaves the village and meets a person on the road, who gives her some matches for her to see the black dog at night. The girl returns to the house and goes to sleep, then lights up the match to better see the black dog: a handsome youth is beside her, whom the tale explains was at the end of his canine curse. The youth regains human form and marries the girl.

In an untitled Seto tale collected by Estonian folklorist Ello Kirss Säärits from teller Ann Kann, a girl lives with her mother. One day, a dog comes and takes the girl as his bride. When the couple go to sleep, the girl sees next to her a handsome youth with a golden wand in his hand. Some time later, the girl pays a visit to her mother and talks about the human spouse. The mother does not believe it, and the girl suggests she brings a light with her after the couple is asleep in the barn. The woman lights a candle and confirms her son-in-law's identity. The next morning, the girl wakes up and cannot find her husband, for the devils have taken both to Hell. Down there, the girl becomes the devils' servant and is forced on tasks: first, to wash white wool black; next, to wash it white again. The girl cries near a stream when a youth with a golden wand (her husband) appears to help her in fulfilling the tasks. Thirdly, the devils give her some linseed and order her to sow, water and harvest the linen, then prepare a sauna's shirt with it, in half a day. The girl cries again, and the young man appears to help her with the magic wand, fulfilling the task for her. He then takes her hand and she realizes he is her husband, then they make their escape from Hell to Heaven. Old people, crows and skunks chase after the couple, but God intervenes and protects them. The tale concludes by explaining the girl betrayed her husband by talking to her mother about his real face, and the dog husband would have been released from his curse, but both were dragged to Hell to be tested.

== See also ==
- Cupid and Psyche
- Graciosa and Percinet
- The Green Serpent
- The King of Love
- The Golden Root
- The Horse-Devil and the Witch
- Tulisa, the Wood-Cutter's Daughter
- Khastakhumar and Bibinagar
- Habrmani
- The Son of the Ogress
- The Tale of the Woodcutter and his Daughters
- Yasmin and the Serpent Prince
- Prunella
- The Little Girl Sold with the Pears
- La Fada Morgana

For the motif of taking the heroine's children, see:

- The Brown Bear of Norway
- The Daughter of the Skies
- Prince Hat under the Ground
- Sigurd, the King's Son (Icelandic fairy tale)
- The Tale of the Hoodie
- The Three Daughters of King O'Hara
- White-Bear-King-Valemon
- The White Hound of the Mountain
