= The Son of the Ogress =

Berber folktale related to "Cupid and Psyche"

Der Sohn der Teriel (French: Le Fils de l'Ogresse; English: The Son of the Ogress) is a Berber folktale, first collected in Kabylia in German by ethnologist Leo Frobenius and published in 1922, about a human maiden who marries a youth that is the son of a man-eating teriel, loses him due to her breaking his trust, and goes after him at his mother's home, where she is forced to perform hard tasks for her.

Scholars relate the tale to the international theme of the Animal as Bridegroom or The Search for the Lost Husband, wherein a human princess marries a supernatural husband or man in animal form, loses him, and goes on a quest to find him. Similarities are also recognized between the tale and the Graeco-Roman myth of Cupid and Psyche.

== Summary ==
A father is set to leave on voyage, but asks his four daughters what presents he can give them when he returns. The three elders say they want beautiful dresses, while the youngest asks for a peculiar present: a pigeon that dances alone in a meadow.

The father finds the dresses in the trip, but still haven't found the pigeon, nor has found anyone who could give him information about it. After he reaches the border of a forest and sees the little bird. He tries to jump onto it to capture it, but a mysterious booming voice orders him to stop his action. The father tries to explain that the bird is a gift for his daughter, and even offers to buy it, but the voice - that belongs to a person named Asphor'ulehóa, the son of a teriel - refuses. Asphor'ulehóa (Note: In another translation, his name is written Asfer n Ihwa, 'Whistling of the rain'.) relents and lets the man take the bird, and makes him promise to give him his youngest daughter for wife. The man knows that a teriel is a flesh-eater creature and fear for his daughter's life, but Asphor'ulehóa assures no harm shall be done to her, and tells him that he will come to their house in the shape of a camel.

The man returns and gives them the presents. When he is on his deathbed, he tells them that a camel shall appear. Some time later, the camel appears at their door. Every one of the four daughters climbs onto it, but it does not move. Only after the fourth daughter climbs onto it with the pigeon does the animal move and takes the girl to another place, already furnished. The girl notices someone comes to her bedroom every night and says she must not light any lamp.

Some time later, her sisters visit her, and she tells them she has lived a comfortable life, but she has never seen the true face of Asphor'ulehóa. Her sisters convince her to spy on him when he comes at night. That night, she lights a candle and conceals it with a pot lid. Her husband comes to bed and falls asleep. She takes off the pot lid and raises her torch at him: Asphor'ulehóa is a beautiful youth. She also notices some little angels ("malaika", in the original) near his body. The little angels tell her they are weaving a dress for Asphor'ulehóa's wife. Asphor'ulehóa wakes up with a startle and admonishes his wife for breaking his trust. He takes his garments and leaves in a hurry.

The girl follows after him, who hurries his steps towards his mother's house. When he arrives there, his human wife reaches him. Asphor'ulehóa tells her the place belongs to his mother, a teriel, who may devour her. So he lets her climb a nearby palm tree and tells her so stay there until his mother promises on his name not to do her any harm.

Asphor'ulehóa enters the house and his mother, the teriel, greets him. She says she will fetch some water to drink in a nearby fountain. She goes outside with a jar and sees the reflection of the girl in the water. Thinking there is a person in the water, she reaches into the reflected image to take it and devour it. She fails and breaks the jar. She goes home to get another jug and to try getting the girl she sees in the image. After some tries, she notices the girl on the tree and tries to convince her to climb down. The girl tells her she must first promise on her son's name not to harm her.

Asphor'ulehóa introduces the girl as his human wife. The next day, the teriel orders her to clean their wide courtyard as soon as she leaves, and not to leave any speckle of dust, otherwise she will devour her. The girl tells her husband about it; Asphor'ulehóa knocks on a rock to summon a large flood of water to clean up the courtyard in no time.

The next morning, the teriel mother orders her daughter-in-law to fill a cushion/pillow with feathers of all birds by nightfall. Asphor'ulehóa tells the girl to go up the hill and shout into the air that Asphor'ulehóa is sick and needs a pillow/cushion, and the birds shall appear to give her their feathers. The third task is for the girl to return every single feather to their original owner. Asphor'ulehóa tells her to go to the same hill, summon the birds, thank them for their help and return their feathers.

The next task is for her to separate water from milk that the teriel has mixed up. Asphor'ulehóa says they can't do it and admits his teriel mother has tried to kill her the past few days. That night, the teriel returns home and sees that the task was not done. Asphor'ulehóa tricks his mother to invite her sister for a feast with the girl as the main dish, but he hides his wife and roasts a bull. He opens up a pit in the dining room, fills it with fat and embers, and closes it with soil. He invites his mother and aunts to the dining room and directs them to stay on that spot. He reminds his mother of her oath and intends to enforce it: he commands the ground to open up and swallow the teriel and his aunts, who are consumed in the fire.

Asphor'ulehóa and his human wife leave the place forever and return to her father's house.

== Analysis ==
=== Tale type ===
Scholarship classifies the tale in the Aarne-Thompson-Uther Index as type ATU 425, "The Search for the Lost Husband", and relate it to the ancient Graeco-Roman myth of Cupid and Psyche, as written down by author Apuleius in the 2nd century CE.

=== Motifs ===
==== The supernatural husband ====
The heroine's husband, Asfar Lehwa, is also the name of a male character from tales in the Kabylian oral repertoire. In these tales, he helps the heroine, his wife, against the impossible tasks given by his ogress mother. In this regard, according to researcher Emmanuel Plantade, the supernatural husband possesses magical powers, and his arrival is preceded by some sort of weather phenomena, like storm or rain. He also appears in the Kabylian tales with a name like "bird (of the storm, of the air, of the wind, of passion)".

==== The ogress antagonist ====
The teriel (tzeriel or tseriel) is described, in Kabylian folklore, as a frightening and monstrous creature with an anthropophagic appetite. She appears to be the female counterpart of the Warzen, another creature, and both populate the Kabylian folktale corpus as antagonists. In Western (French) works, she may be translated as ogresse or ogress.

==== The heroine's tasks ====
German philologist Otto Weinreich compared the heroine's tasks in the tale to Psyche's in the Graeco-Roman myth: just like Psyche is given 4 tasks by her mother-in-law, Venus, the heroine of the Berber tale is given four tasks (three she accomplishes, and one - to separate water from milk - she fails).

Swedish scholar Jan-Öjvind Swahn remarked that, in tales of "The Search for the Lost Husband" type, the task of sorting seeds or grains occurs in Mediterranean and Near Eastern variants of type ATU 425B, "The Witch's Tasks". According to researcher Emmanuel Plantade, the task of grain sorting, done with the aid of ants, appears in most of the variants collected in Kabylie. In this regard, linguist and Berberologist Henri Basset believed in the antiquity of the motifs of the grain-sorting and the ants as the heroine's helpers in Berber tradition. In addition, in the Berber corpus, the heroine is also forced to gather feathers, done by summoning the birds.

== Variants ==
Commenting on an Italian translation of the tale (titled Lo sposo invisibile, or "The Invisible Husband"), professor Annamaria Zesi claims that the story is "diffusa" ("spread") in Kabyle among the Berbers.

Scholarship locates at least 4 more variants in Kabylia: Gold Bud, The Bird of the Air and two homonymous tales titled The Bird of the Storm. Another version, titled Son of the Ogress, was collected from the Sefrou region, in Morocco, and another titled The Story of Seffar Ihwa (Arabic: Seffar Ihwa, 'whistling of the wind'), by Bezzazi.

=== Kabylia ===
==== Gold Bud ====
In a Kabylian tale titled Azejjig Ireqqen (French: Bourgeon d'Or; English: Gold Bud), two brothers, one poor and the other rich, live next to each other with their families: the rich one has seven sons and the poor one has seven daughters. One day, the poor man, a woodcutter, goes to the forest to earn his living, when a strange rain begins to pour, and a voice warns him to leave the forest. The man answers that he needs to earn his living, and the voice gifts him a dish that always produces food. The man's sister-in-law borrows it, and the man returns to the forest. This time, the voice gives him a magic mill so he can feed his family. Again, the sister-in-law asks for the magic mill. The third time, the voice is visibly irritated, and demands the man's youngest daughter, Tiziri ("Moonlight"), to be delivered to the voice as its bride, in exchange for his family being fed with each sunrise. Tiziri is told of this and goes to the forest at night, where she is to wait for transportation. The girl is carried by a giant bird (her husband in avian disguise) to their joint house. They marry and he sets a prohibition on her: she must not light any lamp at night on the bridal chambers. Days pass, and Tiziri asks if she can visit her family, which her husband allows. The girl returns home and finds her family living in abundance. Her mother asks her about her mysterious husband, but she has never seen his face, so Tiziri's mother tells her to bring a torch to their bridal bed. Back home, she follows her mother's suggestion and betrays her husband, Gold Bud. He admonishes her, turns back into a giant bird and vanishes, back to his mother's house. In his rage at her betrayal, a great storm rages on for seven days and nights. After this period, Tiziri follows after him and passes by three shepherds, one grazing a herd of bulls, the second a herd of mares, and the third a herd of sheep and goats. Tiziri asks the shepherds whom the herds belong to, and they all say the animals would have belonged to Tiziri, had she been patient. She then passes by natural features that lead the way: a dried fountain and a normal one; a dead ash tree and a lush one. Finally, she reaches the house of a Teriel, her mother-in-law, who imposes tasks on the human girl: first, she is to clean the patio and the floor. Her husband advises her to lift a stone, and a stream of water will fulfill the task for her. Next, the Teriel orders her to sort a heap of mixed seeds, which a colony of ants fulfills for her. Thirdly, she is to collect feathers from all birds in five sacks; her husband asks her to shout at all the birds that their king is naked, so they will come to offer their feathers. Later, the Teriel orders her to return their feathers; Tiziri is advised to summon the birds again and tell them their king is clothed. Lastly, the Teriel, enraged, says she will let her ogress daughters devour her. Gold Bud appears in person to Tiziri and tells her to give some lamb legs to his sisters, since they are blind. While they are distracted, Gold Bud and Tiziri make their way across the air and fly back to the forest.

==== The Bird of the Air ====
In a Kabylian tale titled L'Oiseau des Airs (Kabylian: Asfuṛ l-lehwa, English: "The Bird of the Air"), a man has seven daughters. On the occasion of a festival, the man asks his daughters which presents he can brings them: the elder girls answer, save for the youngest. When pressed on, she reveals her request: a robe that dances alone in a meadow. The man then departs and searches for the robe, when he meets a merchant that offers him the present, in exchange for marrying the one the present is destined to, and announces his arrival will be marked by a heavy storm, with lightning, winds and rain. The man gets the robe and gifts his youngest daughter. Some time later, a heavy storm pours down on their house, and her fiancé, the Bird of the Air, comes to get his bride under the shape of a horse and takes her to their new home. In their marital home, the Bird of the Air, an ogre, talks to her without showing his face, and they have dinner in darkness. One day, she says her misses her family, and her mysterious husband allows her to visit them. She rides a horse back to her parents; during the visit, she tells her sisters she has never seen her husband; her sisters suggest her husband is a monster, and convince her to light a lamp to better see his true face. The girl returns home and, after preparing dinner, lights a lamp and sees her husband's face: an ogre's. He quickly transforms into a human shape, but admonishes his wife for her familial visit, and abandons her there. The girl decides to follow after him, and passes by stones, shrubs and shepherds, asking them the location of her husband. The Bird of the Air returns to his mother, an ogress's house, just as his wife appears there at the same time. The Bird of the Air meets his wife and warns her that his mother is an ogress that will devour the human. The ogress mother enters the room and senses a different smell; the Bird of the Air makes his mother promise not to devour the human, then introduces his wife. However, the ogress then relents on her promise, and plans the perfect opportunity to renege on her vow, by forcing her daughter-in-law in impossible tasks: first, the ogress mixes into a large heap beans, chick peas, peas, lentils, wheat and barley, and orders her daughter-in-law to separate the cereals. After she leaves, the Bird of the Air complains to his wife, but helps her: he uses his ring to summon a colony of ants to separate the grains. Next, the ogress gives the girl empty pillows and cushions and orders her to fill them with feathers. The Bird of the Air also helps his wife in this task: with his ring, he summons the birds to give her their feathers. Still wanting to devour her daughter-in-law, the ogress orders her to clean the entire house of any fleck of dust, to make it clean enough she can lick the floor. The Bird of the Air uses the ring to summon a flood of water to wash the floor, and a wind to dry it. At last, despite the trick his wife played on him, he made a vow to always protect her, turns into a horse and takes his wife back to her family, where a wedding is celebrated for seven days and nights.

==== The Girl who Wanted a Golden Stone ====
In a Kabylian tale titled La fille qui voulait un caillou en or ("The daughter who wanted a golden stone"), a man has seven sons, and later a girl is born to him. Years later, he is ready to go to a souk (the market), and asks his children what presents he can bring them: the girl asks for a stone of gold. The man goes to the market and finds presents for his sons, but cannot find his daughter's. An ogress's son, who can change shape, tails behind him and transforms into a person who offers the golden stone. On the road, the ogress's son steals the golden stone, which the man notices is missing, then changes into another shape to offer the same stone, in exchange for the girl in marriage. The man accepts, and the ogress's son explains he will appear by his door and beg for alms, after the coming of heavy clouds, the season of winds, clouds and rains. The man comes home and gives the golden stone to his daughter. Some time later, the weather becomes heavy and stormy, and a beggar appears at their door, asking for food. The man orders his daughter to tend to the beggar, instead of his sons, and she vanishes with the beggar to another destination. In her new home, the girl has everything she could desire, but cannot see her husband, and lives like this for months. Time passes, and her mother has another child, a boy, and asks a crow to fly to her only daughter to inform her. The girl is told of her newborn little brother, and sighs that she cannot pay her family a visit. The son of the ogress notices her sadness and agrees to let her visit her family with gifts; and she has to mount on a mule (who is the ogress's son in another form) that will take her back to her family. It happens thus: the girl is welcomed by her family and spends two months and ten days there, then decides to return to her marital home. On the road back home, the mule orders his wife to break the candles she is bringing with herself (which were a gift from her sisters-in-law), which she does one by one, save for the seventh, which she keeps. After her husband retires to their chambers to sleep, she takes the opportunity to light the last candle and leave it there. The burning candle melts and drops on the sleeping ogress's son, who wakes up with a startle, revealing that he will visit his mother, since she has never seen her after his birth. The girl insists to join him, but he warns his ogress mother will devour her. He goes ahead of her, the girl follows him in secret through forests, river and mountains, until they reach his mother's house, where he advises his wife to suck on his mother's breast so the ogress trusts her. Inside the ogress's house, the creature spots her son and goes to hug him, but the girl jumps in front of the ogress to suck on her breast. The ogress's son then explains the girl is his wife. The woman makes a personal promise to devour the girl and, one day, begins to order her around: first, the ogress mixes wheat, barley, lentil, grains and other dry legumes into the ground and orders the princess to separate them - the ogress's son takes a jar of ants from his mother cabinet, releases the insects and they gather the grains for her. The next morning, the ogress orders the girl to sweep the farm from one side to the other - the ogress's son breaks part of a fountain to direct the water course to wash the patio. Thirdly, the ogress orders the girl to prepare a repast of legumes or pasta, in a way that it is cold in her mouth and hot when it enters her stomach - her son places some snow on her mouth, then pours the dish. At last, the ogress orders the girl to stay at a corner of the room. The ogress's son warns the girl she intends to devour her, and advises the human to run.

In the second part of the tale (which is type ATU 709A, "The Sister of Nine Brothers"), the girl escapes the ogress's house and runs into the forest, where she takes shelter with a group of ogres who welcome her as their sister. One day, the ogres go on a hunt and warn her about their evil blind ogre uncle. When the embers burn out, she goes out to get some coals with the blind ogre, who gives some and secretly follows the girl home to devour her. However, the girl turns the tables on him, kills him and burns him in the coals, but he utters a curse before he perishes. Some time later, the girl goes to sweep the cinders, and prickles her finger in a bone that remained of the dead ogre, plunging her into a death-like sleep. The ogres return home and, instead of burying their adoptive sister, place her unconscious body inside a coffin, and the coffin on a camel. Another man sights the girl in the coffin and bring her home with him, where he dislodges the bone and awakens her. Safe at last, the girl marries her saviour.

==== The Captive Princess and the Bird of the Wind ====
Professors Óscar Abenójar, Ouahiba Immoune and Fatima-Zohra Menas collected another Kabylian tale from a 90-year-old teller from Great Kabylia. In this tale, titled La princesa cautiva y el pájaro del viento ("The captive princess and the bird of the wind"), a sultan's daughter spends her days trapped at home. One day, while she is standing on a balcony, the bird of the wind flies in and steals her belongings, despite her trying to stop it: first, her veil, then a pin, a bracelet and a fu'a, among other things. The bird then vanishes. Some time later, the sultan's daughter asks her maidservant to fetch her water. On her way there, she finds some feathers on the ground, and sees some camels walking by the seashore. She grabs a camel by its tail and follows it, until it reaches a stable. The maidservant hides between the oxen and other animals, and watches as slaves come, have a meal then sleep, and the bird of the wind flies in to the stables and sing a song about the maiden locked in her room, as the animals cry with him. The bird then flies away. The maidservant leaves and rushes back to her mistress's palace to tell the other servants about the wondrous events she witnessed. The maiden in the room overhears it and, fueled by a sudden resolution, declares she will leave home and accompany the maidservant to the place where she was the other night. The duo follow the camels to the same stable and hide behind the animals; the bird of the wind flies in soon after and sings his sad song, but the animals begin to laugh, since the maiden the bird sings about is there with them. The maiden comes out of hiding and the bird notices she is there, then flies away. The maiden decides to rush after him: she passes by two trees (one lush and green and other dried); two fountains (one dried and other full of water); two tents where they sell silk (one full of customers and the other empty); two windmills (one milling the grain and the other not), and lastly by two cafés (one full of people and the other empty). She follows his trail and ends up at the café door. The bird of the wind comes out of the café tent, grabs the maiden and takes her to his house. They land, and the bird warns the maiden his mother is a cannibal ogress, but leaves her under his mother's care. The ogress, however, plans to eat the maiden, and sets her on hard tasks: first, to get bird feathers to fill a mattress for her, then clean all the feathers from the house (done by summoning all the birds); next, to sort out a mixed heap of grains (done by summoning ants), and sweep the patios (the bird of the wind commands the rivers to wash away the hay). The bird of the wind, then, tricks his mother to fatten the maiden and invite her ogress sisters to devour her, while he plots with the maiden. The ogress mother falls for her son's plan and gives food to the maiden and, after the latter seems plump enough, invites her sisters to feast on the human. The maiden offers to dance before the ogresses to distract them. After her dance, she smears their hair with gas and throws a firestarter at them. While the ogresses catch on fire, the bird of the wind takes the girl away with him through the air.

==== The Burning Rose ====
In a tale provided by teller Helima Laâdj, from Eastern Kabylia, with the title Aseğğid ireqqen and translated to French with the title La rose ardente ("The Burning Rose"), a poor father earns his family's living by cutting wood. One day, he is cutting some wood when an invisible voice stops him and demands to marry the man's daughter. The next day, the man returns and meets a person who gives him a magic dish that can provide couscous and meat for the family. However, the local king learns of the magic dish and orders the man to give it up for a feast. Thus, the poor man returns to the forest and gains another dish, but this time the mysterious person says he will come to fetch his bride, the poor man's daughter, and his arrival will be signaled by storms, winds, thunder and rain. The poor man returns home and prepares for when her bridegroom will come. Soon enough, a storm comes, and the poor man sends his daughter Aïcha to draw water for them, when a person comes and takes the girl with them. The girl's brother tries to search for her, but his father stops his quest. Back to Aïcha, she lives with a mysterious person that emits a halo of light and can only communicate with their voice. One day, the girl misses her family and her husband allows her to visit them. He changes form to that of an eagle and carries her to her family's house, where she is welcomed with a feast. Aïchas mother pesters her with many questions about her marital life, but she cannot answer, save that her husband shines like a celestial body. Her mother advises her to hide a candle under a "marmite" and wait until he is fast asleep. The eagle carries her back home. Aïcha decides to follow her mother's advice and, with a lamp, discovers her husband is handsome. However, a drop of oil falls on his body, he wakes up, chastises Aïcha, and states he will return to his mother's house. Aïcha follows her husband's voice as he travels back to his mother's house, despite his warning that his family is made of ogres, until she stops by a pair of meadows, one lush and verdant, the other arid and dry. The arid meadow chastises Aïcha for having seen Rose Ardente ("Burning Rose"), her husband, and directs her to the other meadow. Aïcha reaches her mother-in-law's house and Burning Rose introduces the human Aïcha as his human wife. The ogress mother soon devises ways to devour the girl, by setting hard tasks for her: firstly, she orders Aïcha to fulfill a mattress with bird feathers - Burning Rose advises her to call all the birds by saying Burning Rose is ill and needs a mattress; secondly, she orders Aïcha to return the feathers - Burning Rose advises her to call on the birds again; thirdly, the ogress orders the girl to sweep the place and not leave any speck of dust - Burning Rose tells his wife to use a jar full of water and another jar filled with air to wash and dry the house. Undefeated, Burning Rose's mother decides to invite her female relatives to devour the human girl. However, Burning Rose takes his wife with him in his burnous and both escape from his mother's house.

==== The Rose of Light ====
In a Kabylian tale titled La rose de lumière ("The Rose of Light"), an old man has seven daughters and tells his them he will go on pilgrimage to Mecca, but leaves them with provisions. Eventually, the provisions run out, and the group has to forage for food in the forest. The youngest of the girls meets the son of the ogress in the forest, who remarks on her intelligence and beauty. The son of the ogress and the girl meet each other whenever her sisters find herbs for their subsistance, and the youth asks the human girl to marry her. The girl accepts for her sisters' sake, and the youth tells her he will send a horse to her house with provisions, and she must climb on the horse to be taken to her new marital house. The next day, it happens as the ogress's son promised, and the horse, who is the ogress's son under a magical disguise, takes her to their new home, where she warns his wife not to light any source. After she enters their new home, the place is soon illuminated by dozens of blinding lights, thus the name of her husband, Rose de Lumière. Some time later, the girl is allowed to visit her family, and tells them about the mysterious husband she can never see at night. Her sisters give her seven candles for her to better see his face. Rose de Lumière, in the shape of a horse, appears to take her back to their house and warns her that whatever she is thinking of bringing back with her will only cause misfortune, so she tosses away six of the candles, but hides the last one. Back home at their mansion, Rose de Lumière is asleep, when his wife light up the candle and directs it at her husband's sleeping form. She finds a handsome man next to her. Rose de Lumière wakes with a start, admonishes his wife and tells he is the son of an ogress, bidding her not to follow him. Rose de Lumière reaches his mother's house, where the ogress senses a human scent on him and asks if he has married someone. Meanwhile, Rose de Lumière's wife follows after him and passes by two fountains, one dry and other full of water, two palm trees, one dry and the other lush and with date fruits, and two grazing meadows, one dry and the other verdant. At last, the girl reaches the ogress's house, where she reunites with Rose de Lumière. The ogress's son admonishes her for following him to the lair of his man-eating mother, but takes his wife and introduces him to his mother as their new maidservant. However, the ogress knows she is her son's wife, and soon begins to hound her by setting impossible tasks for her to fail, so the ogress can devour her. First, the ogress mixes in a heap all sorts of grains for the human girl to separate. She cries for the impossibility of the task, when Rose de Lumière appears and summons a colony of ants to help his wife. The ogress suspects her son had a hand in this, and sets another task: for the girl to wash the entire house in a short time - Rose de Lumière summons a jet of water to wash the floors and a gust of wind to dry them. Finally, the ogress mother decides to send for her sisters for a banquet where they will eat the human girl. Rose de Lumière conspires with his wife to get rid of this ogress family for good: she is to hide behind the door when the ogresses enter their house, refuse to serve them water and throw a burning firewood at them. The following day, during the banquet, the girl does as her husband advised and the ogresses are burning. Rose de Lumière's mother bids her son join her in killing the human, but Rose de Lumiére's wife tosses another burning firewood at her mother-in-law, while Rose de Lumière closes the door to his mother's house and barricades the ogresses inside to let them burn to death. The tale was collected in the Kabylian language from a source named Iqmraw Fatima, from Tigzirt, Tizi Ouzou Province.

==== The Bird of Passion ====
In a Kabylian tale translated to French with the title L'oiseau de la passion ("The Bird of Passion"), a man has seven daughters and goes on pilgrimage, then asks his daughters which presents he can bring them. Zouba, the cadette, asks for golden thimbles, which her father cannot find. An invisible man offers the objects in exchange for Zouba's hand in marriage, and he warns the old man he will come when the skies are raining blood. Some time later, a beggar man appears during the blood rain and begs for alms. The father sends his seven daughters to attend to the beggar, and Zouba gives him alms. The beggar man takes Zouba on an aerial journey to a palatial home where they live together, but where she has never seen her husband's face. In time, she begins to miss home and is allowed a visit to her father and sisters. Back home, she says she has never seen her husband's face in her luxurious palace, and her jealous sisters advise her to take their lamps with her to bed at night to see if he is a man or a monster. After seven days, a horse comes to take Zouba back home. The horse advises her to drop the lamps, but she hides one in her clothes. After she reaches her husband's home, she takes the remaining lamp to bed and sees a handsome man next to her. Betrayed, her husband decides to let his mother decide Zouba's fate, and takes her to his mother's house. The Bird of Passion's mother, an ogress, discovers her son is married and submits her daughter-in-law under hard tasks. First, to separate a mixed heap of grains. A multicolored bird named Bird of Passion perches next to Zouba and bids her lift a rock: an army of ants comes to help in the task. Next, the ogress orders Zouba to sweep the floor of any trace of dust - the Bird of Passion bids Zouba lifts a rock for a jet of water and another for a gust of wind to come and fulfill the task for her. Thirdly, the ogress orders Zouba to untangle bran and wool - the Bird of Passion flies in and makes a sign to untangle the materials. Fourthly, the ogress orders Zouba to fill a cushion with bird feathers - the Bird of Passion advises her to climb a hill and shout at the birds that the Bird of Passion is dead, and the birds will give her their feathers. Fifthly, Zouba is to unmake the cushion and return the feathers - the Bird of Passion advises her to return to the hill and shout that Bird of Passion is alive, and the birds will come to fetch their feathers. Finally, the ogress mother decides to devour her human daughter-in-law and summons her ogress sisters for a banquet. While the ogress aunts celebrate the occasion, the Bird of Passion overhears their plan, which they sing in the form of a song. The ogress relatives gather to jump on Zouba, when a large bird snatches the girl with its claws and flies away from the ogresses' compound, under their curses. While in flight, Zouba realizes that the avian helper is her husband, Bird of Passion. Both land in the forest and live together, away from their families.

=== Algeria ===
==== The Love Sparrow ====
In an Algerian tale titled "عصفور الهوى" (Transcription: "eusfur alhawaa"), translated as "The Love Sparrow", a man has seven daughters. When Eid is near, the man asks his daughters what presents he can bring them from the market, and the youngest asks for a dress that dances alone. While he is at the market, the man finds the dancing robe at the store that belongs to a ghoul, who promises the robe in exchange for the hand of the man's youngest daughter, Felfela, in marriage. A deal is made, and the ghoul tells the man to inform his daughter he will come on a stormy day. Time passes, and on a stormy, rainy day, the ghoul comes to take Felfela as his bride and carries her to his house. They live together, but he does not let her see his face, and leaves early in the morning and returns at night. In time, she misses her family and the ghoul allows her a visit by taking her to her family's home. Felfela tells her sisters she has never seen her husband's face, and the sisters advise her to light a lamp to better see him at night. The ghoul takes her back and, after he is asleep, she lights up a lamp, finding a handsome youth next to her. The ghoul wakes up and admonishes his wife, blaming her family for their misery. Felfela goes after him, calling on "eusfur alhawaa" (her husband's name). She passes by three fountains, two with flowing water and a dry one, which has dried up for Love Sparrow's sorrow, then by a tree which has also dried up due to his sorrow. Felfela also passes by stores filled with cloaks, handkerchiefs and shoes that would have belonged to her, but she realizes her family did cause her her misery. Felfela eventually reaches her mother-in-law's house, who is a ghoul and feigns hospitality, but plots to devour her: first, she orders the girl to bring feathers for two pillows - her husband appears and advises her to go to a meadow and shout for the birds to bring their feathers, since the Love Sparrow is dead. It happens thus. Next, the ghoul mother orders the girl to return the feathers to the birds - her husband advises her to return to the forest and call out to the birds that Love Sparrow is safe and sound, and they will gladly retake their feathers. Thirdly, the ghoul mother orders her to sweep the house and not leave a speck of dust - Love Sparrow uses his ring to summon rain to water the house, then the Sun to dry it. Fourthly, the ghoul mother orders her daughter-in-law to prepare a dish that is cool in the mouth, but warm in the stomach - Love Sparrow advises his wife to cook the maná and, while he distracts his mother by asking her to close her eyes and placing a piece of food dowsed in cold water, his wife is to turn the hot pan into her mouth. Finally, the girl is ordered to take part in a henna session and to hold the kerchief upside down during the session. Her ghoul husband notices that the ink is staining Felfela's hands, but she resigns herself, saying that she will let the ink stain her, since her heart has been stained already. This repeats a few times more, until the ghoul husband feels sorry for his wife, interrupts the session and escapes with his human wife from his mother's house. The ghoul-mother tries to catch them, but they are far too ahead of her, and she ceases her pursuit. The ghoul husband and Felfela pass by the stores filled with his gifts to her, and stop by the dried fountain and the dried tree, which, respectively, begin to flow and bloom again. The tale was collected from a source named Amzal N., from Beni Ourtilane, in 1988.

==== The Bird of the Rain ====
In an Algerian tale collected from a source named Fatma Baaziz, in Azfoun, Tizi Ouzou, around 1990, with the title "عصفور المطر" (Transcription: eusfur almutri) or "The Bird of the Rain", a young woman is invited by other girls to fetch firewood with them in the forest. She has never left home, and tries to make bundles of twigs, but they fall apart. She finds a decorated stick she wishes to bring home to her brother, but the stick talks to her after all the girls have returned home, and says it will come to fetch her as its bride on a rainy, stormy day. The girl returns home and informs her mother about it. The bird of the rain appears on the appointed day and fetches the girl to be his bride. The bird of the rain and the girl live together, but she begins to miss her family and the bird of rain allows her to pay them a visit. The girl tells her mother she has never seen her husband's face, and the woman advises her to light up seven lamps and hide them, then illuminate his face. The girl returns home, but the bird of the rain, disguised as a ram, warns her about taking the lamps with her, so she drops all but one, and returns home. At night, she lights up the remaining candle and finds a handsome youth next to her, with ten rings on him. She questions the rings and they say they would have been for her, had she not been rash. She accidentally lets a drop of wax fall on his face, he wakes up and runs away. The girl goes after him, passing by a meadow half green and half yellow, then by a tree half dried, half in blossom, and by two fountains, one dried and one flowing. She finally reaches her husband's mother's home, and her husband appears to her, warning her his mother is an ogress who may devour her, but she can win her over by suckling n her breasts. It happens thus, and the ogress welcomes her. The bird of the rain introduces the girl as his wife. Some time later, while her son is away, the ogress orders the girl to sweep the house while she is away. The girl cries over the task, when her husband approaches her, admonishes her for listening to her family, and advises her to lift a stone and call out to the water, saying the bird of the rain has married and wishes to have a wedding. The girl lifts a rock and water washes away the dust on the floor. Next, the ogress mixes up grains in a pile (wheat, barley, lentils and others) and orders her to sort them out - the bird of rain advises her to call the aid of a nearby anthill and hundreds of ants come to help her. Lastly, the ogress tells the human girl she is hurting and only pillows made of bird feathers will cure her - the bird of the rain tells his wife to call out to the birds, saying that the bird of the rain is sick, they will give them their feathers. Fourth, the ogress finds the two pillows and orders her daughter-in-law to return the feathers to the birds - the bird of the rain advises his wife to call out all the birds, saying bird of the rain is better, and the birds will appear to retake their feathers. Finally, the bird of the rain suspects the ogress will devour his wife, so he asks his mother to sleep in another room that night, locks her up and burns his mother, then lives in peace with his wife.

=== Morocco ===
In a Moroccan tale titled Le Cheval Persan, collected by Dr. Françoise Légey from teller Jema'a, slave to Sultan Moulay-Ḥasan, a king has a daughter and a "cheval persan" (Persian horse). The princess regularly feeds the horse with a bucket of milk and some almonds. The horse - actually, a Roûḥânî (translated as "spirit") - tells the king he wants to marry the princess. The king overhears him and consents. Some time later, when the princess goes to feed it, she sees spectacular and extravagant wedding gifts. The king marries his daughter to the horse, but the queen, her mother, expresses her distaste to such a marriage. The horse takes off the equine skin and becomes a handsome youth. The queen approaches her daughter and tells her plan: a slave will come to wedding chambers, take the skin and burn it. However, the youth wears the skin again and escapes. The princess tries to follow him, but loses his track. She reaches a salt mine and sees a herd of donkeys carrying loads of salt. She inquires about their destination: the castle of the Persian horse, because he has married earlier. The princess reaches her husband's castle and her husband explains his mother, his sisters and his aunts are all "Ghoûles" (man-eating creatures). He advises her to suckle on his mother's breasts in order to earn her favour. She does that and the mother-in-law begrudgingly accepts her. Soon, she forces her to cover the walls of a room with bird feathers. Her husband, under an avian disguise, commands all birds to fulfill the task. Next, the Ghoûle mother gives the human princess two nuts and sends her to her Ghoûle sisters. On the road, the princess opens the two nuts and an orchestra of musicians escape from the nuts. Her husband, still under the avian disguise, summons the musicians back into the two nuts, and tells his wife that this task is a trap; she is to go to his aunts' house, throw the nuts at them and flee. Finally, the Ghoûle mother summons all Ghoûles for her son's wedding and places an oil lamp on the princess's hands, telling her that, as soon as the wick is out, the princess will be devoured. Again, on her husband's instructions, the princess takes the hairs of one of the Ghoûles to replace the wick. The hairs catch on fire and burn the Ghoûles. Cheval persan takes the princess back to her father's kingdom.

In another Moroccan tale collected by Dr. Légey from Jema'a with the title Moulay Ḥammam, la Jeune Fille et les Ghoûles ("Moulay Hammam, the Maiden and the Man-Eaters"), a man has to go to Mecca on pilgrimage, but before he leaves he asks his seven daughters what he can bring them as gifts. The seventh daughter asks him to deliver her letter to "Moulay Ḥammam ou 'Imâm", and whispers a command on her father's mule's ear to not let him forget his promise. The man finds gifts for 6 of his daughters, but forgets about the seventh. The mule stops on its tracks, until the man remembers. He tries to find this "Moulay Ḥammam ou 'Imâm", and he talks to three Ghoûles (man-eating creatures). A third Ghoûle takes the letter and gives the man two walnuts, and explains that his daughter is to wash her bedroom, set the bed and toss a walnut into the fire. The man returns home, distributes the presents, and gives the walnuts to his seventh daughter with the instructions. The girl prepares her room and tosses one walnut into the fire. Moulay Ḥammam ou 'Imâm appears in her room in the shape of a dove and becomes a youth. He brandishes his sword and sticks it in the ground: a retinue of slaves and djinns appear and prepare for them a meal. They eat and talk through the night, until, just before dawn, Moulay Ḥammam turns back into a dove and prepares to leave through the window, but gives the girl a bag of gold. Morning comes, and her sisters and aunts enter her bedroom, see the bag and take it for themselves. This repeats for some time, until a female neighbour asks the girl if her beloved Moulay Ḥammam leaves her some gift. On their next encounter, the girl asks Moulay Hammam about any gift, and he shows her the bag of gold. One day, the girl is invited to the public baths by her sisters, and one of them returns to the girl room and smashes the window. Moulay Hammam flies to the broken window, falls into the broken glass and goes home badly hurt. The girl fears that something must have happened to her beloved, since he fails to appear for the following nights. So she disguises herself as a man and travels the world to find him. She stops by two trees, Kîwâna and Zîwâna, who talk to each other about Moulay Hammam’s injuries and how some of their leaves and branches may cure him. Armed with this new knowledge, she departs to Moulay Hammam’s country and introduces herself as a doctor. Once there, Moulay Hammam suspects the doctor is his wife, and his mother, a Ghoûle, sets up three trials to discover the doctor’s gender: prepare a sheep’s head for a meal (women prefer the tongue, the ears and the eyes), examine the horse’s fodder (yellow alfalfa if the rider is female; green if the rider is male) and to invite her to take a bath in the river. With the horse’s help, the girl avoids being found out. She asks for Moulay Hammam’s ring as a reward and returns to her family. Back home, she tosses the second walnut into the fire and summons her beloved to her room, where she explains the truth. Moulay Hammam takes her to her country, and his mother forces the girl on some tasks. First, she is to clean the house and wash it in a way that each drop of water lies at an equal distance one from the other. Moulay Hammam summons his ‘afrit to accomplish it. Next, she is to separate a heap of cereal grains (corn, wheat, barley, beans, and lentil), which is done by the birds of the world, since Moulay Hammam is their king. The third task is to hold an oil lamp for the whole night to illuminate a session of henna done to Moulay. The girl uses a strand of her own hair as a substitute wick for the oil lamp and cries, her tears falling on his face; her husband awakes, sees that the fire can consume her, and produces another wick to preserve the lamp and spare her. The fourth task is to go to the Ghoûle’s sister (also a man-eating creature) and to get from her a tamis. Moulay advises her to give the correct fodder to a dog and a donkey, to compliment a river of blood; to get a standing beam and lay it down on the ground; to tell a roadblock it is a wide route; and to suckle on his aunt’s breast. She gets the tamis and brings it to Moulay’s mother. Lastly, she forces the girl to hold an oil lamp again, this time on a henna session for the Ghoûle’s daughter-in-law. The girl holds the oil lamp and cries, a tear falling on Moulay’s cheek. He wakes up, takes off the oil lamp and takes his true human wife on his wings back to her kingdom. French scholar Émile Dermenghem noted that this tale begins with the father's gifts for his daughters, and "ends like the tale of Psyche, with the mother-in-law's tasks".

Author Mohammed Radi collected a Tamazight tale from his own elderly mother, Fadma Mimoun, in Tazouta, Sefrou Province. In this tale, originally titled in Standard Moroccan Tamazight: ⵎⴻⵎⵎⵉⵙ ⵏ ⵜⵔⵡⵓ, romanized: memmis n trwu, and translated to French as Fils de l'ogresse ("The Son of the Ogress"), a poor orphan girl named Aïcha lives in the forest behind seven portals. At night, she senses there is someone that comes to her bedside at night and leaves at dawn, stirring her curiosity to learn of their identity. One night, she takes a candle to her bedside and light it up to better see her companion: she finds a handsome man beside her, so beautiful is he she faints and drops the candle on his face. He wakes up with a startle and admonishes Aïcha, saying he is the son of the ogress. The following morning, the couple go to the fountain for laundry, and the son of the ogress tells Aïcha to suckle on his mother's breast to win her over. It happens thus, and the ogress mother welcomes Aïcha as her daughter-in-law, and marries her to his son. However, the ogress mother soon begins to hound the girl: first, she orders Aïcha to queue up water droplets when she returns. Aïcha cries for the task, when her husband appears and advises her to wait for when his mother returns as a gust of wind, wash her own hair and let the drops fall to the ground. It happens thus, and Aïcha fulfills the task, but the ogress mother suspects it was her son's doing. Next, the ogress orders the girl to sew a carpet of bird feathers - the ogress's son gives Aïcha a bag and tells her to go to the meadow and shout seven times "Chawlam! Chawlam!" to the passing birds and they will give her their feathers. By doing this Aïcha fulfills the task, and still the ogress suspects it was her son's doing. Finally, the ogress marries her own son to his maternal cousin, and forces Aïcha to use her hair as candle wicks for the henna session. The ogress's son notices Aïcha's position and questions her about her burning hairs, when she tells him she cares not for the burnt hair, but for her own burnt heart. On hearing this, the ogress's son takes a pestle, kills his mother and cousin, and takes Aïcha with him.

=== Hausa people ===
In a Hausa tale translated by missionary Adam Mischlich into German as Das verwandelte Pferd ("The Transformed Horse"), a prince is changed into a horse and rides to another town. A man finds his equine form and brings it home to his two daughters. When he is ready to leave, the man orders his two daughters to give water and food to the horse: the elder refuses, but the youngest obeys, and the horse, in gratitude, provides golden coins in a calabash. The man then decides to marry one of his daughters to the horse: the elder refuses, but the youngest agrees, and the horse changes back into a prince. The now human horse prince suggests they visit the prince's homeland, and his wife agrees to join him. On the way there, the prince warns the girl his mother is a man-eating witch, and this is why he shapeshifted into a horse: so he could escape his mother's grasp and marry. The girl meets her mother-in-law, who gives her a single rice grain for her to cook. The girl asks her husband how she can cook a whole meal with it, and the prince says she just has to place it in the pot. The girl prepares the meal for themselves and makes a dish for the mother-in-law. The prince then tells his wife how they can destroy his mother and be left in peace: while he fetches some firewood, the girl is to bring the food to his mother. The girl sets the food before her and returns to the house, and the mother-in-law goes after her. Meanwhile, the prince has set a fire and his mother falls into it, burning to death. Freed from his mother, the prince and his wife live in happiness and wealth. Later, the girl's elder sister learns of her cadette's situation, and decides to pay her a visit. However, the prince warns his wife that, when he was in the form of a horse, she mistreated him, so he will expel his sister-in-law. When the elder sister-in-law actually arrives, the prince abandons his wife, leaving her with her sister. After a while, the pair grow bored and return to their father's homeland, but the younger sister, missing her husband, looks for him and finds him in a city. They go back home and the tale ends. May Augusta Klipple listed the tale, sourced from Western Sudan, as a variant of The Search for the Lost Husband. She also pointed out that, despite the differences from the international tale type, she considered it "essentially" the same type.

=== Palestine ===
Scholars Ibrahim Muhawi and Sharif Kanaana collected an Arab Palestinian tale titled Jummez bin Yazur, šex it-tyur ("Jummez Bin Yazur, Chief of the Birds"): a merchant has three daughters, the youngest named Sitt il-Husun (“Mistress of Beauty”). One day, he has to go to the hajj, and asks his three daughters what they want when he returns from the hajj. The youngest asks her father to bring her Jummez Bin Yazur, Chief of the Birds, and curses his camels not to returns if he forgets it. He meets a sheikh who directs him to Yazur’s house and a command to summon this person. He stands in front of the house and shouts that his daughter is looking for his son, Jummez Bin Yazur. Some time later, a bird arrives at Sitt il-Husun’s window and turns into a youth. Both converse until dawn, when he becomes a bird and is ready to depart, leaving a purse full of gold for her. The jealous sisters discover their sister’s luck. One day, Sitt il-Husun asks Jummez about what does him harm: pieces of broken glass. The sisters learn of this and break the glass in her window. Jummez flies in bird shape and hurts himself in the broken glass. Time passes, and Sitt il-Husun notices his absence, so she disguises herself as a beggar and tries to look for him. One time, she rests by a tree and overhears the conversation between two doves about how to cure Jummez. Sitt il-Husun kills a dove and mixes its blood and feathers. She reaches Jummez’s house and uses the remedy on him. They recognize each other, and she explains that his injuries were her sisters’ doing. They reconcile, but Jummez's sisters force Sitt il-Husun on some tasks: to sweep and mop the whole town, and to fill ten mattresses for the wedding with enough feathers. On this second task, Jummez advises her to go to the top of the mountain and shout at all the birds that “Jummez Bin Yazur, Chief of the Birds, is dead”, which will summon all the birds to give her their feathers. Lastly, Jummez’s sisters order Sitt il-Husun to get the straw tray hanging on the wall of the ghouleh’s house. Jummez advises Sitt il-Husun that she is to exchange the correct food for animals (meat for lions; barley for horses), to repair a fallen stone terrace of the house, get the tray and flee. After fulfilling the tasks, Jummez’s sisters consent with his marriage to Sitt il-Husun. Muhawi and Kanaana classified the tale as type ATU 432, "The Prince as Bird", and noted that the tasks by Jummez's sisters parallel Venus's tasks in the myth of Cupid and Psyche.

== See also ==
- Graciosa and Percinet
- The Green Serpent
- The King of Love
- Ulv Kongesøn (Prince Wolf)
- The Golden Root
- The Horse-Devil and the Witch
- Tulisa, the Wood-Cutter's Daughter
- Khastakhumar and Bibinagar
- Habrmani
- La Fada Morgana
- Yasmin and the Serpent Prince
