= The Horse-Devil and the Witch =

Turkish fairy tale

The Horse-Devil and the Witch or The Horse-Dew and the Witch is a Turkish fairy tale first collected by Hungarian Turkologist Ignác Kúnos in the late 19th century. The story deals about a princess who marries a youth under an animal disguise, loses him due to her breaking his trust, and goes after him at his mother's home, where she is forced to perform hard tasks for her.

The tale belongs to the international cycle of the Animal as Bridegroom or The Search for the Lost Husband, wherein a human princess marries a supernatural husband, loses him, and goes on a quest to find him. According to scholars and local folktale catalogues, the supernatural husband may appear in the shape of a horse in Turkey and nearby regions.

== Sources ==
The story was first published by folklorist Ignác Kúnos in Turkish as Az ló-ördög, in Hungarian as A ló-ördög és a boszorkány, and in German as Der Ross-Dew und die Hexe.

== Translations ==
The tale also appears in German as Der Dew in Rossgestalt ("The Horse-Shaped Dev").

The tale was also translated into English as The Horse and the She-Devil, and The Princess, the Horse and the She-Devil.

Spanish translator Luis Astrana Marín translated the tale as El Caballo del Genio y el Látigo ("The Djinn Horse and the Whip").

The tale was also translated to French as Le Cheval enchanté et la Sorcière ("The Enchanted Horse and the Sorceress").

== Summary ==
Before he travels afar, the padishah orders his daughters to groom his favorite horse. The eldest daughters are rebuffed by the animal, and only the third daughter is able to groom and feed it. Her father notices their approximation and marries her to the animal, while the elder sisters are married to the Vezir and to the Sheik-ul-Islam. The youngest princess moves out to the stables, and discovers the horse is actually a human at night, promising to be quiet about it.

When her father organizes a tournament, the horse husband takes off his horse skin and joins it as a rider, eventually defeating and unhorsing his brothers-in-law. This repeats for the second day of the tournament. On both occasions, the elder sisters admire their respective husbands' bravery, mocking their cadette for her marriage to the horse-husband. On the third day, the horse husband gives her three strands of his hair to his wife to summon him whenever she may need help. He goes to the tournament. Proud of his deed and cajoled by her sisters' endless mockery, the princess betrays his secret and he disappears.

She seeks him out on a long quest and reaches a mountain. She burns one of the hairs he gave her and he appears. They embrace and he tells her this mountain is the abode of his witch mother and the creature may kill her. So, to protect her, he transforms her into an apple to hide her inside his mother's house. The horse-husband brings her in, but his ogress mother senses a human smell nearby. The horse-husband makes his mother promise on the egg not to harm, and introduces his wife to her.

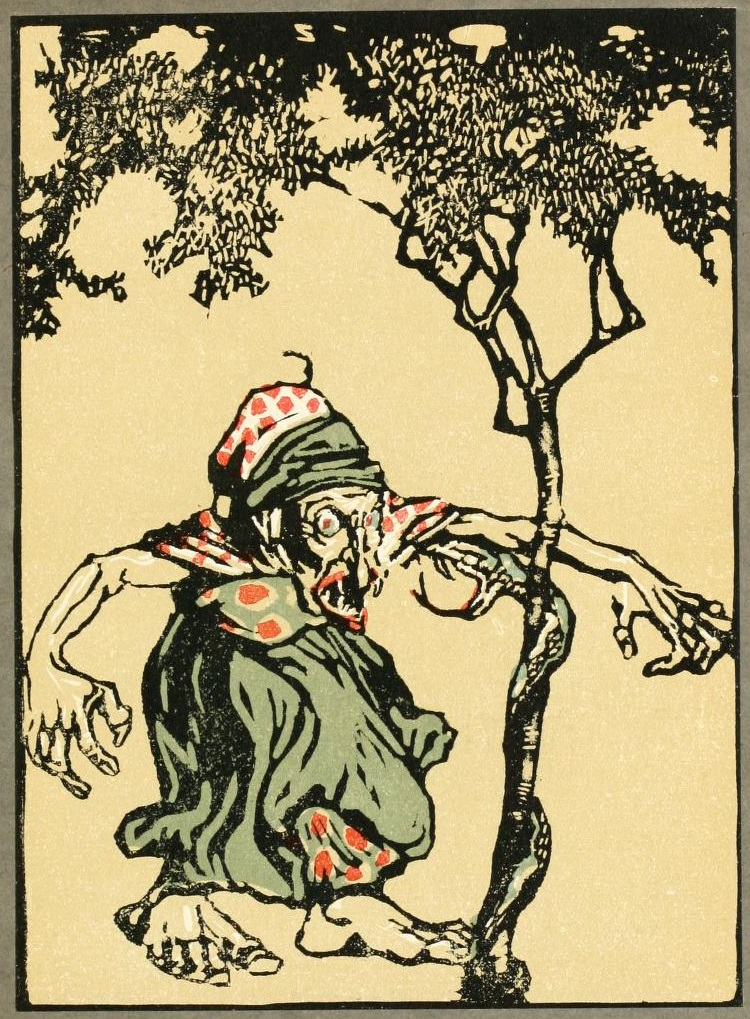
The prince (in snake form) coils around the princess (in tree form) and faces his Dev-mother. Illustration by William Pogany for a 1913 book.

At first, the ogress mother assigns her simple tasks, but, wanting to take her revenge on the human princess, orders her to sweep and not sweep. The princess burns her husband's hairs and he appears with advice: she is to sweep the room and not sweep the courtyard. After doing so, the ogress suspects her son had his hand in teaching her how to pass the task. Next, the ogress orders the princess to fill three vases with her tears; once again, she burns her husband's hair and he appears with guidance: fill the vases with water and sprinkle some salt on them.

Thirdly, the ogress orders the princess to prepare some pancakes for her, but she cannot find any ingredients. At this moment, the horse-husband is away, but he appears suddenly and says his mother will stop at nothing to destroy them. Thus, they make their escape from the witch by transforming into objects: first, they change into a swimming bath (the princess) and a bath attendant (him), then into a spring (her) and a person drawing water (him), and finally into a tree (the princess) and a serpent coiled around it (the horse prince). The ogress mother reaches the pair and realizes she cannot attack the tree without harming her son, but requests that her son shows her his wife's little finger, so she can let them be. The princess shows her little finger, which is swallowed down by the ogress mother. The creature leaves them be, and they return to the princess's kingdom, where they celebrate a wedding, the Dew-son's talisman being destroyed.

== Analysis ==
=== Tale type ===
The tale belongs to the cycle of stories classified in the international Aarne-Thompson-Uther Index as ATU 425, "The Search for the Lost Husband", and subtypes related to the Animal as Bridegroom cycle.

=== Motifs ===
==== The horse husband ====
According to Richard McGillivray Dawkins, variants with the horse as the animal husband were found in the Balkans, in Turkey and among the Romani from Bulgaria. Likewise, scholar Jan-Öjvind Swahn asserted that the animal or supernatural husband appears as a horse in tale type 425A (see footnote "a") "in the Orient". In addition, Swahn identified a motif he named "favourite horse desires the king's daughter", which he associated with his type A (see below), and which Greek folklorist Georgios A. Megas, in his study, noted to be "traditional" in Turkey regarding subtype A (see below).

Turkologist Iya Vasilyevna Stebleva, by comparing Turkish tales Çember-Tiyar and Bileiz, suggests a mythic approximation between the horse and the deva (Turkish: div).

==== The heroes' Magic Flight ====
According to Christine Goldberg, some variants of the type show as a closing episode "The Magic Flight" sequence, a combination that appears "sporadically in Europe", but "traditionally in Turkey". As their final transformation to deceive the ogress mother, the princess becomes a tree and her supernatural husband becomes a snake coiled around it. Although this episode is more characteristic of tale type ATU 313, "The Magic Flight", some variants of type ATU 425B also show it as a closing episode. German literary critic Walter Puchner argues that the motif attached itself to type 425B, as a Wandermotiv ("Wandering motif").

== Variants ==
=== Turkey ===
In the Typen türkischer Volksmärchen ("Turkish Folktale Catalogue"), by Wolfram Eberhard and Pertev Naili Boratav, both scholars listed the variants with the horse husband under one type: TTV 98, "Der Pferdemann" ("The Horse Man"), (Note: In his monograph about Cupid and Psyche, Jan-Öjvind Swahn acknowledged that Turkish type 98 was his 425A, that is, "Cupid and Psyche", being the "oldest" and containing the episode of the witch's tasks.) which corresponded in the international classification to tale type AaTh 425. (Note: Some publications use the initials EB or EbBo to refer to their catalogue.) In a later book, Boratav stated that the Catalogue registered 25 variants, but six more had been collected since its publication.

In most of the variants collected, the supernatural husband is a horse, followed by a man with a donkey's head and a camel. In other tales, he may be a snake, a frog or even Turkish hero Kaloghlan.

==== Çember-Tiyar ====
Folklorist Pertev Boratav collected a Turkish tale titled Çember-Tiyar, translated to German as Tschember-Tiyar and to Russian as "Чембер-Тияр". In this tale, a sultan with three daughters marries the two elders to human princes. As the youngest is still single, she is the only one to give grapes to their favorite horse and the only one he responds to affectionately. The sultan marries his third daughter to the horse, who is an enchanted prince. She promises to keep his secret. On a tournament, the horse prince appears in red vestments on a red horse and defeats his brothers-in-law, and on the next day on white garments. She betrays the secret and burns the horse skin. The enchanted prince becomes a dove and flies away. The princess follows after him and reaches the house of an ogress (a dev), his mother, who orders her to perform difficult tasks for her, including sweeping and not sweeping the floor, getting a sieve from a distant neighbour, filling a teapot with her tears and filling mattresses with bird feathers. Finally, Çember-Tiyar's mother betroths him to another girl; on the wedding day the ogress mother ties the princess to a pole and places ten wax candles on her fingers and one on her head. As she begins to be set on fire, Çember-Tiyar replaces her for his bride and the couple escape in a "Magic Flight"-type sequence, by throwing objects behind them, and lastly, by turning themselves into a tree (the princess) and into a snake coiled around it (Çember-Tiyar).

==== At Koca ====
Turkish folklorist Naki Tezel published the tale At Koca, translated into English as "The Horse who was in Love", into German by Otto Spies as Der Pferdemann ("The Horse Husband"), and to Spanish as El caballo enamorado ("The Horse in Love"). In this tale, a judge has three daughters and a horse that eats only hazelnuts and roasted raisins. However, the animal looks emaciated and sick. A doctor states that it is in love, so the remedy is to find him a bride. The horse chooses no human maiden, but the judge's youngest daughter. They marry and she discovers he is a human prince named Tahir Bey. Tahir tells her that, when she goes to the bath house, to endure the any mockery her sisters and friends may throw her way for marrying an animal. Nevertheless, one day she decides to tell them he is an enchanted prince, and for them to see him with their own eyes. The horse overhears her words, and returns to his homeland. When she returns home, her husband has disappeared. She goes on a quest for him, first accompanied by a regiment of soldiers, then on her own. Finally, she reaches a plain with two houses, one of gold and the other of silver. She talks to a coming servant who is getting water for their master (Tahir), and the judge's daughter drops her ring in the water jug. Tahir notices the ring and brings his wife to his house. He warns the judge's daughter that his mother is a Dev (in the German translation; ogress in the English translation) that may devour her, but manages to tame his mother long enough to introduce the human to his mother. The next day, Tahir's mother gives the girl a sieve of onions and orders her to peel and not to peel them. The second day, the Dev-mother gives her a bowl of laundry and orders her to wash and not wash it. Tahir Bey advises his wife what to do. Wanting to get rid of his daughter-in-law, the ogress sends the girl to the ogress's sister to retrieve a flute and a drum - a trap set to kill the maiden. Tahir Bey gives his wife a ring, and tells her to leave it on a desk, exchange the animals' fodder (hay for a cow, bone for a dog), get the instruments while his aunt is away and flee. Lastly, the Dev-mother places a cousin of Tahir's in place of the judge's daughter and forces the human girl to stand behind a door, be quiet, and hold candles on her fingers, otherwise the Dev will devour her. The judge's daughter's fingers begin to burn as the candles melt in her hands, and she cries. Warned by his true wife's wails, Tahir Bey notices his mother's deception, places the candles on his cousin's finger, and takes his human wife away from his mother. The Dev-mother enters the room and notices that her son escaped, jumps onto a jug and rushes after him. On her pursuit, Tahir Bey and his human wife transform themselves in objects: first, into a fountain (the girl) and a jug (Tahir); an orchard (the girl) and a gardener (Tahir); a bride (the girl) and a priest (Tahir). Their last transformation is into a tree (the girl) and a snake coiled in its branches (Tahir). The Dev-mother stops by the tree, Tahir turns back into a human and kills his mother. Free at last, Tahir takes his human wife back to her father.

==== The Princess and the Red Horse Husband ====
In a tale collected by Barbara K. Walker with the title The Princess and the Red Horse Husband, a padishah summons his three daughters to plan their weddings: they should stay at the palace's balcony and throw a golden apple at their prospective husbands. The elder sisters are betrothed to humans; the youngest throws a ball and hits a red horse. She repeats the action, with the same results. She marries the red horse. That night, he reveals he is human, after all, but begs her to stay as a horse during the day and not to reveal anything to her sisters, for he is "the fairy giant king's son". One day, her sisters mock her again for her strange choice of husband, and she, fed up, decides to show them the truth, by having them spy on him through a keyhole. The sisters convince her to burn his horse skin; he becomes a dove and flies away. She asks her father to fashion a pair of iron shoes and decides to go after him. After a hole is made in her iron shoes, her husband appears and turns her into an apple, to bring it to his mother's house. He hides her for some time, but one time advises her to nurse from his giant mother's breasts when she is kneading dough. She does and his mother warms up to her. Her son (Shah Selim) comes up with a false story that the princess is their maid, now that he is to be married to his cousin. The giant mother orders her to fill mattresses with feathers, and to go to the aunt's house to get the bread griddle. Her husband, Shah Selim, advises her on both occasions: in his aunt's house, she must open a closed door, feed correctly a horse and a dog, take the griddle and escape from the house. At last, the Shah Selim's wedding comes, and, after the ceremony, his giant mother forces the princess to bear ten candles, one on each finger, for the whole night near the married couple. Shah Selim advises her to wait until the candles have melted enough and to smear it on the bride's face. She does and the couple escape on a pair of horses. His father notices his son's absence and chases after the couple; Shah Selim and the princess transform into things to trick the pursuer. Finally, they turn into a stick and a snake coiled around it. This time, Shah Selim's mother arrives and, seeing the objects, hesitates, for she might hurt her son. So she returns home and lets them be.

==== The Girl and the Horse ====
In a Turkish tale collected by Russian philologist Nikolai K. Dimitriev with the title "Девушка и конь" ("The Girl and the Horse"), a padishah asks his daughters to look after his favourite horse. Only the youngest is able to give water and food to the animal. Seeing the relationship between both, he decides to marry one to the other. The girl comes to live in the stable with the horse, who is the son of a deva. At night, the stable becomes a palace for them. One day, the horse assumes human shape and joins his brothers-in-law in a game of throwing darts. The princess's sisters mock her for her animal husband and praise their human spouses. On the next day, the horse prince gives three tufts of hair to his wife. On the third day, fed up with the incessant mockery, she reveals the truth about him and he disappears. The princess decides to go after him. One day, she reaches the foot of a mountain, burns one of the hairs and summons her husband. He comes to her and tells her his deva family lives in that mountain. He turns her into an apple and takes her into their home. He makes his mother promise not to harm her and shows her his wife. The deva mother forces the girl to do chores: to sweep and not sweep, and to fill two vases with her tears. The last task for her is to bake a pie, even though she cannot find any ingredient in the house. They decide to escape and his family pursues them. The princess and her husband disguise themselves as different objects to elude them: first, into a bath house (her) and a bath house guard (him); then, into a spring (her), while he assumes another appearance with a jar in his hand; lastly, into a tree (her) and a dragon coiled around it (him). The tale was also classified as Turkish type TTV 98 (see above), with the episode of "The Magic Flight" (ATU 313).

==== Emir Nur ====
In a Turkish tale published by journalist Enver Behnan Şapolyo with the title Emir Nur, a sultan has a field of beans ready to harvest, but a horse comes and tramples them. The following year, the sultan places black pitch around the fields for the horse's next arrival. The equine appears and is glued in the pitch. The soldiers take the animal to the stables and it keeps neighing. The elder princess tries to calm it down, but the horse keeps whining. When the youngest princess does, the horse calms down. One day, the cadette princess is at the stables when the horse turns into a handsome youth. The sultan, unaware of this, arranges marriages to his three daughters: the eldest to the grand vizier's son and the middle one to the second vizier's son, then questions his cadette about her choice of husband. The girl announces she will marry the red horse in the stables. The sultan is furious at the idea, but lets her join with the red horse in the stables. One night, the princess takes the red horse and both escape to a corner of the city, where they establish themselves and raise a family with their kids.

Some time later, the sultan decides to celebrate his elder daughters' wedding and gathers the people for events. The red horse youth tells his wife he will attend the ceremony as a white horseman, but she is not to tell anyone about it, lest he turns into a bird and flies away. The princess enters her father's palace in secret and people comment that she would have a beautiful wedding celebration if she chose the middle vizier's son, and not the horse. Spurred by the comments, she points to the white horseman on a horse in the patio as says he is her husband. Due to this, the white horseman turns into a bird and flies up the princess's window, admonishes her for betraying his secret, says his name is Emir Nur and that he is a Dev from the land of the devs, and states she will not find him again even if she wears down an iron cane, then flies away. The princess mourns for her loss for days, then dons the iron apparel and goes after him. She passes by the Mountain of Copper and asks a maidservant carrying a copper jug about Emir Nur's location. The maidservant directs her to the Silver Mountain, where a maidservant with silver jug says she will find Emir Nur at the Golden Mountain. Finally, the princess reaches Golden Mountain and asks the maidservant carrying a golden jug about Emir Nur. The maidservant says that Emir Nur is her fiancé and the water is for his ablutions. The princess secretly drops his ring inside the jug, which the maidservant takes him. Emir Nur recognizes his ring and asks if there is someone at the spring. Emir Nur goes to meet his human wife and says she needs to suckle his mother's breasts when she is baking bread to make her accept her.

The princess does as Emir Nur instructs and wins her over. Later, the dev-mother tells the princess to make the bed and not make it, sweep and not sweep the house, and fill jars with her tears, for she is leaving to visit Emir Nur's father. After she leaves, Emir Nur explains his wife how to perform the tasks: make only half the bed, sweep the floor and leave some garbage in a corner and fill the jars with salt and water. The dev-mother suspects her son Emir Nur taught the princess how to do it, then orders her to bring back bird feathers for a pillow for Emir Nur, since he is marrying his aunt's daughter - Emir Nur advises the princess to go to the mountain and shout to the birds that Emir Nur is getting married, so they will molt their feathers for her. Thirdly, the dev-mother, angry at the human's successes, orders her to go to her sister's house on the mountain and fetch from there musical instruments. The princess cries, when her husband appears and advises her how to proceed: pass by a stream of pus and blood, compliment it by saying it contains such beautiful water and drink from it; pass by a field of "pıtırak", compliment it by saying it is a field of grass and brush it, exchange the fodder between two animals (meat for a dog, hay for a horse), meet his aunt and ask for the instruments, steal the box while she is away sharpening her teeth, and rush back, without opening it.

The princess follows the instructions to the letter, but, on the road back, she opens up the box and two wolves ("kurt", in the original) come out of the box. The princess sits down to cry, when Emir Nur appears to her, brings back the animals and locks them back into the box. The princess delivers the box to the dev-mother, who realizes her son's wedding to his cousin, placing the princess at the door. Emir Nur kills his cousin, takes the princess and escapes with her. The following morning, the dev-mother finds her son's dev-bride dead and sends her family after them. On the road, Emir Nur and the princess turn into objects to fool their chasers: first, they turn into a bowl (the princess) and a jar (Emir Nur) to fool the dev-mother's younger sister; next, into a stick and a comb to fool her great-aunt. Lastly, she chases after her son herself, and Emir Nur turns the princess into a poplar tree and himself into a snake coiled around it. The dev-mother attacks the tree, but the snake deflects the attacks. In a fury, the dev-mother breaks a branch of the tree and flies away. Emir Nur restores himself and the princess to human form, but notices that his wife has lost a little finger. Still, the couple return to the sultan's kingdom and celebrate a new wedding.

==== The Padishah's Little Daughter and the Horse at the Stables ====
In a tale from Serik, published in 1961 in the journal Türk Folklor Araştırmalar ("Turkish Folklore Studies") with the title Padişahın Küçük Kızı ve Tavladaki At ("The Padishah's Little Daughter and the Horse at the Stables"), a padishah has three daughters, and each announces their suitors: the elder wants to marry the vizier's elder son, the middle one the vizier's youngest son, and the youngest a horse at the stables. Despite some mockery, she is dead set on her choice and takes care of the horse, grooming it and feeding it grapes. The story then explains that the horse is in fact the son of the Queen of the Peris, who cursed her son to become a horse for seven years. One day, the time of the curse expires and the horse changes into a youth right in front of the princess's eyes. The youth calms her by explaining he was the horse, changed into that state by his mother's spell. He then asks her to accompany him back to the land of peris. The princess gleefully accepts and flies with him to his mother's house. After they land, the Queen of the Peris greets her son and asks him who is his female companion, a human. To avoid his mother's anger, the youth spins a story that he brought the girl as a female servant to work as a turkey-herd for them.

After seven years, the Queen of the Peris is preparing her son's wedding to a female peri - the reason why he was cursed in the first place - and orders the human girl to fill jars with her tears, since the wedding guests drink salt water at the ceremony, while the rest of them take part in the wedding procession. The youth excuses himself and rushes to the princess to teach her how to fulfill the task: sprinkle salt in the water. Next, the Queen orders the girl to fill mattresses with bird feathers. The youth leaves the procession again and gives the princess a feather; she is to burn it to summon all birds, which will give her their feathers. Lastly, the procession arrives, and the Queen lights ten candles on the princess's fingers, for her to hold them all night. All the while, the peri youth is reading a book, and his bride enters the chambers. Some time later, while his peri bride is asleep, he takes the candles from the human princess's hands and tosses them on his bed, then turns into a horse and rides away with her. Back to the bride, she burns to death in a fire that also destroys the castle. The Queen of the Peris sends her sisters after them, but the youth and the princess disguise themselves as a farmer and a field, and a mason and wall to fool their pursuers. Finally, the Queen herself goes after them, and they turn into a sapling (the princess; "fidan", in the original) and a black snake (the youth; "kara bir yılan", in the original). The Queen menaces them, but, seeing the snake coiled around the tree as to protect it, she leaves them be and gives them her blessing. The youth and the princess return to her kingdom, where they marry.

==== The King's Daughter and Bileijz ====
Linguist Gyula Németh collected a tale from the Turkish population of Vidin, Bulgaria, with the German title Die Königstochter und Bilejiz ("The King's Daughter and Bilejiz"), which was translated as "Дочь падишаха и Билеиз" ("The Padishah's Daughter and Bileiz"). In this tale, a padishah is going on a trip, and asks his daughters to look after his horse and feed him dry oats. The horse only responds to the youngest. When the padishah returns, he learns of the horse's affectionate treatment of his third daughter and marries them. After the wedding, the girl begins to cry, but the horse takes off the horse skin and reveals he is a human named Bileiz. The next day, he appears as a knight in red garments on the padishah's tournament, and on the day after in black clothes. In case anything happens to him, he gives his wife a signet ring as a token. She tells to her family the knight is the horse, and he disappears. She then decides to go after him, by wearing an iron amulet and using an iron cane. She reaches a fountain, with an inscription nearby: "Bileiz". She sees a servant girl fetching water and begs for some to drink. She drops the signet ring on the servant's jar. Bileiz finds his wife, takes her home and explains his mother is a seven-headed deva and might devour her. His mother appears and smells human flesh, but Bileiz spins a story about hiring the girl as another maid. So, the deva mother forces her to sweep half of the floor and not sweep the other half, to cook half of the meat and not cook the other half, and go to a relative of the deva to get a plank and some bread dough. Finally, the deva mother orders her to carry ten candles on her fingers during Bileiz's marriage to another bride. The padishah's daughter vents to her husband about his mother, and he tells her he planned their escape: when she is holding the ten candles, she must drop them and jump on a winged horse, while he rides a normal one. It happens as he describes. While on the run, his deva relatives come after them in the shape of a fog. They transform into a minaret and a muezim, a watermelon and a gardener, a snake and a rosebush. Bileiz's sister hesitates in cutting either the snake or the rosebush, and returns home.

==== Uçar Leyli ====
In a Turkish tale titled Uçar Leyli, collected from a source in Pazarcik and published by Helimoğlu Yavuz, a sultan has a prized horse. One day, it falls ill, and the doctors say that people should place some food on their clothes for the horse to eat, and whoever the horse eats from, it means the animal is in love with them. It happens thus, but the horse refuses to eat from any of the citizens. The sultan sends for his three daughters. Each of the princesses place some grass on their skirts to feed the horse, but the equine only wants to eat from the sultan's youngest daughter. The sultan is offended that the horse has fallen in love with his cadette, and moves her out of the palace to live in the stables. The princess is sad for her fate, but the animal takes off its horseskin and reveals he is the son of the sultan of the peris. They live like this for a time. One day, the son of the sultan of the peris, named Uçar Leyli, says he will take part in a tournament, and asks the princess not to say anything about the mysterious rider. Uçar Leyli takes part in the tournament for the first two days, first as a rider in red clothes on a red horse, and on the second day as a green rider on a green horse. The princess's elder sisters admire and swoon over the mysterious rider. On the third day, Uçar Leyli appears as a white rider on a white horse, and the princess reveals the rider is the horse. After the races, the princess returns to the stables, and Uçar Leyli tells her to come look for him on Mountain of Pearls, on Mountain of Silver, or Mountain of Gold, turns into a bird and flies away. The princess cries for her mistake and asks her father for iron shoes and iron staff, then begins a journey for Uçar Leyli.

She passes by the mountain of mother-of-pearl, where she sees a maidservant wearing mother-of-pearl clothes and carrying a mother-or-pearl jug. The princess asks the maidservant for some water, but the latter refuses her, since the water is for Uçar Leyli, who visits them every seven years. The princess slaps the maidservant and drinks the water, while the maidservant returns in tears to the nearby palace of mother-of-pearl and tells Uçar Leyli a stranger slapped her by the fountain. Uçar Leyli declares to let the stranger come find him in the silver mountain, and flies away as a bird. The princess goes after him in the mountain of silver, where she sees a maidservant wearing silver clothes and carrying a silver jug. The princess asks the maidservant for some water, but the latter refuses her, since the water is for Uçar Leyli, who is visiting his aunt. The princess slaps the maidservant and drinks the water, while the maidservant returns in tears to the nearby palace of silver and tells Uçar Leyli a stranger slapped her by the fountain. Uçar Leyli declares to let the stranger come find him in the golden mountain, and flies away as a bird. Lastly, the princess reaches the mountain of gold, where she see a woman carrying a golden jug to the fountain. The princess lies to the maidservant that her mistress expelled her from the house, so she is begging to be taken in. The golden palace is the place where Uçar Leyli lives with his mother, a peri. The peri-mother arranges his wedding to another person, and forces her new servant, the princess, to hold ten lit torches on her fingers for the whole night during the wedding celebrations. The princess is placed behind a door and weeps until morning. Near dawn, Uçar Leyli sees the princess's suffering, removes the torches from her hands, places her on his back and flies away with her. The bride alerts Uçar Leyli's mother her son is missing and she pays a visit to her sisters to know of his whereabouts. The aunts go looking for them by flying. On the road, the couple notices that they are being pursued and change into objects to fool his aunts: first, they turn into a stream (the princess) and a duck (Uçar Leyli), then into an orchard (her) and a garden-keeper (him). Finally, Uçar Leyli's mother herself goes after him, and the couple transform into a cypress tree (the princess) and a seven-headed snake (Uçar Leyli) coiled around the base. His mother reaches the couple, notices she cannot harm the princess and lets them be. Uçar Leyli and the princess return home and celebrate a forty-day wedding.

==== Haydar Havva ====
In a Turkish tale titled Haydar Havva, a sultan has three daughters of marriageable age. One day, the youngest princess hatches a plan and summons their lala (tutor): he is to buy from the market three melons of variable ripeness (an overripe, one that is just past ripeness, and another that is just ripe) to be given to their father as analogy to their marriageablity. It happens thus, and the king interprets the message: the girls are ready to marry, and issues a proclamation for youths to come in front of the castle and jump over the moat ("hendek"), so that the princesses will stand behind a cage and throw a small ball at their husbands of choice. The elder princess throws her ball to the son of the Grand Mufti, the middle one to the son of the Serasker, and the princess tosses hers to a jumping colt. The people think that the princess made a mistake, so she repeats her action, and still the small ball falls next to the colt. The king relents and marries his daughters to their respective husbands, the cadette to the colt, to the elder princesses' endless mockery. The cadette princess sits with the foal and sees that it does not eat barley or straw, only normal food, to her suspicions. One day, the foal removes the horseskin to become a handsome youth, who puts a ring on her finger, asking her not to reveal his human identity. One day, the princess is fed up with her sisters' mockery and bids them to come see their brother-in-law's beauty. The elder princesses see the foal in human form and faint at his beauty. The colt admonishes his wife and tells her she will only find him after she wanders for years and wears out iron clothes, iron sandals and an iron staff, then vanishes.

The princess cries for her husband, commissions the iron apparel and goes after her husband. She wanders for years, through valleys and mountains, until she reaches a fountain near a palace of gold. She sees a maidservant drawing water with a gold jug, and asks for some, but the servant says that the water is for Haydar Havva's aunt. The princess continues on her journey and reaches a castle of silver, where a maidservant is fetching water with a silver jug for another of Haydar Havva's aunts. At last, she reaches a palace of jewels and pearls and finds a third servant fetching water, then asks for some. The servant fulfills her request, and the princess drops a ring inside the jug. Haydar Havva recognizes the ring, who has his name engraved on it, and realizes his wife is there. He goes outside, brings her to his room and dismisses the servant. Haydar Havva notices the princess has the iron apparel worn out, and warns her that his mother is a dev (a giantess), so he will hide the human by turning her into a broom. Haydar Havva's dev-mother comes, which is announced by an earthquake, and senses a human smell. Haydar Havva dismisses his mother's commentary, but asks her if she would devour a human person that reached their lands. His dev-mother swears on him not to devour them, and Haydar Havva restores his wife to human form, who suckles her breasts to win her over. As the days pass, while Haydar Havva is away, the dev-woman forces the princess on hard tasks: first, to fill two jars with her tears - Haydar Havva summons seven mountain birds to help his wife. Next, the dev-mother gives the princess two sacks of walnuts to be cracked - Haydar Havva does it for her; thirdly, she gives her three towels to be washed, which Haydar Havve does for his wife.

Fourthly, the dev-mother sends the princess to her brother to retrieve a drawer ("çekmece", in the original). Haydar Havva intercepts his wife before she goes to his aunt and advises her to steal the drawer while his aunt goes upstairs to sharpen her teeth. It happens thus, and the princess escapes from his aunt's house with the drawer. On the way back, she opens the drawer out of curiosity and a bird flies out of it. She tries to place the bird inside the cage ("kafes", in the original), to no avail. Her husband appears in a cloud and bids the bird fly back to its cage. The princess takes the cage, places it in the drawer and brings it back to the dev-mother, who is surprised with her success. Lastly, the dev-mother arranges a wedding for Haydar Havva with a dev-bride, and devs and ejderhas are invited to the ceremony. The creature orders the princess to place ten lit candles on her finger on the wedding chambers, then return to her room as the candles are almost melted - a trap, since the dev-mother placed boiling water in the room to scald the princess to break the vow not to eat her. Haydar Havva anticipates his mother's ploy and has the princess and the dev-bride change clothes, so that the dev-bride is the one holding the torches and being scalded.

Haydar Havva escapes with his human wife, but his relatives chase after them, so they transform into other people to fool his family: first, into a garden (the princess) and a garden-keeper (Haydar Havva) to fool his aunt; next, into a fountain (her) and a faucet (him) to fool his elder aunt. Lastly, the dev-mother goes after them herself, and the couple transform into a rose (the princess) with a flower bud next to it and an ejderha (Haydar Havva) laying atop the rose. The dev-mother reaches them, recognizes the couple, gives a sigh and bursts apart. Forty years have passed since the sultan last saw his daughter, and seven years since his daughter has found herself amidst the devs. One day, a guardsman announce the king there is a couple come to see him: it is the princess and her husband, now in human form. The sultan is glad for his daughter's return and celebrates a new wedding. The tale was originally collected by Müteyemmen Başol, in 16.02.1945, from a 47-year-old woman in Manyas, who heard it from an Arab servant.

==== The Green Horse (Sivas) ====
In a Turkish Anatolian tale collected in Sivas by professor Necati Demir with the title Yeşil At ("Green Horse"), a padishah has three daughters. At one time, the monarch sets them to be married by casting three arrows at random: whomever it lands next to, they shall marry them. The elder throws her and lands near the vizier, while the youngest throws her and it lands next to a grazing green horse. She repeats her action and it still lands near the green horse. The princess moves out to the stable and a handsome youth comes out of the green horseskin, stating he is her bridegroom. The princess is happy and is given his ring. Later, the elder princess's wedding is celebrated which the youngest princess attends, where she is endlessly mocked for her choice of equine bridegroom. On the middle princess's wedding, the cadette retorts there is a bridegroom inside the horseskin. His talisman breaks, and she goes to meet the human Green Horse in the stables. He admonishes her, saying she can only find him after walking in iron sandals and with an iron cane, then departs. The princess dons the iron garments, dresses like a Keloglan and goes on a journey.

She journeys far and wide until she reaches a fountain, noticing her iron shoes are worn out. Suddenly, a maidservant is nearing the fountain to fetch water for Green Horse and tries to shoo the princess away, who is in her Keloglan disguise. She asks for water to drink, and drops the ring inside the jug. The maidservant brings the water jug to Green Horse and he notices the ring, then asks about whoever is at the fountain. The servant says that Keloglan is at the fountain and Green Horse asks to bring them in. Green Horse and the princess reunite, but he takes her in as a gooseherder to hide her, since Green Horse was also betrothed to a Dev's daughter. Since they are to be married in one week's time, the Dev suspects a closeness between Green Horse and the Keloglan, and gives the princess a mattress to be filled with bird feathers for the bride. Green Horse tells her to shout at the birds to take their feathers, for Green Horse is getting married. The princess does as instructed and fulfills the task. Her husband Green Horse also gives her almonds and nuts with beautiful dresses inside, which the Dev steals from her to give to his daughter.

The wedding day comes, and the Dev asks Green Horse to decapitate Keloglan and serve their head on a plate. Green Horse beheads the Dev's daughter, heats up the oven and tosses the head in a cauldron to boil, then escapes with his human wife. Meanwhile, the Dev eats the head, unaware it belongs to his dead daughter. The Dev goes to check on the Green Horse and the bride and finds the beheaded daughter, then, in a rage, flies after the fleeing couple on a cube. Back to the fleeing couple, Green Horse, the princess and his horse change shape to fool the Dev: first, they become a miller (Green Horse), wheat (princess) and a millstone (the horse), then into a gardener (Green Horse), a wall (the princess), and a tree (the horse). The Dev falls for their trick twice and goes looking elsewhere. However, since the princess is pregnant, she gives birth to a baby boy on the road. The third time, the Dev comes after them, and Green Horse turns the boy into a red rose, and himself, the princess and the horse into cobwebs to protect him. The Dev tries to pluck the rose, but its thorns hurt his hand and he retreats, flying away on his cube. Green Horse and his family return home and live in peace.

==== The Green Horse (Antalya) ====
In a Turkish tale collected in Eastern Antalya with the title Yeşil At ("The Green Horse"), a padishah has an apple tree in an orchard. The apples disappear everytime it yields its fruits, so he decides to investigate: he finds a flying Green Horse that comes down from the sky and steals the apples. He cannot stop the theft, and, for the following years, the princesses offer to catch the Green Horse. The elder two fail. On the third year, the youngest princess buys some twine and ties it all over the field to trap the Green Horse when it appears. She captures the animal and takes it to the stables. The Green Horse removes his equine skin to become a handsome youth. The princess does not know about his coat, but he tells her to keep if hidden and not show it to anyone, for he will travel around his country and settle his affairs, and warns the princess that lest she shows his coat to anyone, she will have to depart on a journey in iron shoes until they are worn out and her iron hook is bent. The princess goes after him in iron shoes and with an iron cane for years until they are worn down and the cane is bent in her hand, over mountains and rocks, until she reaches a village and sees some women drawing water. The princess remembers the Green Horse's (called Hülübarik) words, and says she is there for a wedding. The women say there is no wedding, since Hülübarik's body is burning and they are drawing water to cool him.

Hülübarik regains his composure and says he is now cold, not burning anymore, so he goes from house to house saying he is cold. He then tells his mother to start the wedding, since the guests have arrived. Thus, Hülübarik's mother brings two heavy and large jars and tell the princess to fill the jars with her tears. She leaves. Hülübarik appears to the princess and helps her place some water and salt to fill it, then advises the princess to feign crying over the jar when she returns. The woman returns, drinks from a jar and accuses the princess of being the lover of her son Hülübarik. The following day, she says she needs a comb, and sends the princess to an aunt. Hülübarik intercepts the princess, warns her this is a trap to kill her, so she is to steal the comb in the shelf and bring it back. Thirdly, the woman gives the princess a pair of scissors and a bag, and tells her to go up a mountain to fill it with feathers, by summoning the mountains, the stones and the flying birds, for Hülübarik's wedding is there - a trap, since Hülübarik's mother sent her to be devoured by her crow sister, who is a dev just like Hülübarik's mother. The princess goes to the mountaintop and summons the birds, unaware of the danger. Hülübarik appears to her and confirms that the birds will come to fulfill her orders. After she gathers many feathers, Hülübarik's crow aunt flies in to devour the princess, but she throws the scissors at the crow's mouth to stop her attack and runs back home.

Hülübarik's wedding to his aunt's daughter is arranged and they go to the bridal chambers, but he refuses to marry his cousin due to his mother tormenting the human princess. His mother tries to convince him to marry her niece, but he wants to bring the princess with him. He confides in the human princess and orders his cousin to sleep, since Devs sleep for three months after lying down. They take the opportunity to escape after verifying that everyone else is asleep also. However, his dev-family wakes up, notice that Hülübarik and the princess are not there and chase after them. On the road, after stopping to rest, the princess nudges Hülübarik awake from her lap and alerts that his family is after them, so he tells the princess to shake herself and transform. Thus, they turn into objects to trick their pursuers: first, into a pot of water (her) and a bowl of water (him), to trick his aunt; next, into a garden (her) and a garden-keeper (him) to trick his crow-aunt, named Devrisökük. Finally, Hülübarik's mother goes after the couple herself, so they shapeshift into a rose (her) and a thorn around it (him). Hülübarik's mother tries to pluck the rose, but the thorns surround it and hurt her hands and feet. Defeated, she tosses stones at the rose, curses them and leaves. Hülübarik and the princess return to the padishah's homeland and celebrate a forty day and forty night wedding.

==== Other tales ====
===== From the Uysal-Walker Archive =====
The Uysal–Walker Archive of Turkish Oral Narrative collected other tales with the horse husband. In one, The Trials of the Padişah's Youngest Daughter, collected in 1976 from teller Mehmet Karakaş, from the Urfa Province, the padishah's three daughters buy watermelons that represent their marriageability: the first melon is overripe, the second half-overripe and half-edible, and the third just right. Seeing this, their father arranges for them to throw apples at their prospective suitors from a balcony. The third does not toss hers, and tells her father her suitor stationed his horse near the palace. They take the horse to the stables. A parade of young men passes in front of the palace, but her suitor apparently isn't there. She goes to the stables and pets the horse, who tells her that she must hide him for three Fridays, otherwise he will disappear. Her sisters' weddings occur on the next two Fridays, and during the festivities a mysterious young man appears and wins the games, who the princess recognizes as the horse. On the second occasion, the princess tells her sisters the young man is the horse, then cries over her decision. The next day, the horse vanishes, and a little bird lands on her shoulder, telling her she will find him after she wears down a pair of slippers and an iron cane. She wanders through a copper well house, a silver fortress and a gold fortress. In the gold fortress, she sees a girl fetching water from the well and begs for a drink, in the name of Emirilâm. The servant gives her the jug and the princess drops her ring inside it. Her groom recognizes the ring and brings the princess in, but he warns his is a family of giants, and shrinks her size to hide her from them. The youth hides her for three days and on the fourth she appears, since the giants cannot harm her after three days. Now at a normal size, the giantess mother forces the girl to do some chores in preparation for her son's wedding to his cousin: to gather downy feathers for the marital bed; and to bring her "the song and the word". The youth advises her on both occasions: to get the song and the word, she must enter the forest and give the correct food for two animals (meat to the dog, and grass for the horse), switch the positions of two carpets (one hanging on the wall, the other lying on the ground); enter a palace, get the box and do not open it. She follows his instructions, but she opens the box: violin players and tambourine players leap out of it, but the horse youth, Emirilâm, locks them inside the box. Finally, Emirilâm's wedding is here: his giant mother ties the princess to a tree in the courtyard and sets a fire at the foot of the tree. Emirilâm finds and unties the princess, and both escape in a cloud of smoke. His giantess mother pursues the couple, who disguise themselves as a pool and a fish. The giantess mother fails in finding them, and explodes in anger. Emirilâm and the princess reach her father's kingdom and marry.

=== Turkish Cyprus ===
In a Turkish Cypriot tale titled Mavi/Yeşil Melek ("Blue/Green Angel"), a padishah her three daughters who are of marriageable age. The monarch realizes he cannot marry them off to any suitor without angering any family, so he decides to leave it to chance: the princesses are to choose their husbands by throwing arrows at random amidst a crowd. Thus, many suitors pitch their tents, and the princesses throw their arrows: the elder two's land near tents with human suitors inside, while the youngest's lands near the door of a barn, where a lame horse lies inside. Thinking she made a mistake, she throws it twice more, and twice more it lands near the barn. The princess then moves out to the barn to live with the horse. After midnight, the horse neighs and turns into a human prince, who introduces himself as Yeşil Melek ("Green Angel"), cursed into that equine state, and the princess must not reveal his secret, lest he disappears. Some time later, the elder princesses are married in grand ceremonies that last for three days, and riding games are played with the guests. On the first day, a mysterious knight appears in red vestments and on a red horse, then a knight in blue on a blue-black horse comes on the second day. The elder princesses marvel at the knight's beauty, and mock their cadette for marrying the lame horse. On the third day, the Green Horse appears at the ceremony in human form, with green garments and a black horse. The night before, he gave the princess a ring. Back to present time, the princess reveals the green knight is the lame horse, called Green Angel. She then returns to the barn and cannot find her husband. After forty days, she asks the padishah to give her iron sandals and an iron staff, then begins a journey to find Green Angel. She wanders up and down, until she finds a maidservant climbing down the Copper Mountain and carrying a copper basin. The princess asks her if she saw Green Angel, and the maidservant says the water is for him. The princess tries to follow the girl, but loses her tracks. The next day, the princess finds another maidservant, this time climbing down the Silver Mountain and carrying a silver basin, again to fetch water for Green Angel. Again, the princess loses track of the maidservant. Finally, the princess sights a maidservant coming from the Golden Mountain carrying a golden jug, then drops her ring inside the jug. The maidservant brings the jug to Green Angel, who notices the ring and goes outside to reunite with his wife. He admonishes his wife for telling the secret, and warns that his dev-mother will devour her, so he turns her into a pin and carries her home. Inside the house, the dev-mother smells a human scent, which Green Angel dismisses. After his mother goes to sleep, Green Angel urges the princess to escape with him in the dark of night; he turns into a horse and she rides him into the wilderness. The next day, Green Angel's female relatives (aunt and mother) chase after him, and Green Angel turns himself and the princess to trick them: first, he turns the princess into a rose tree and himself into a snake coiled around it. His aunt recognizes this form as the couple and goes to pluck the rose, but the snake hisses in protest. The aunt leaves them be. Later, his own mother chases after them, and Green Angel turns himself and the princess into a fountain and a jet of water. The dev-mother leaves them be, and the couple return to the padishah's realm, where Green Angel resumes his human form in green clothes and remarries the youngest princess. According to the informant, the tale is known both as Mavi Melek ("Blue Angel") and Yeşil Melek ("Green Angel").

In a Turkish Cypriot tale titled Padişahın Üç Kızı ve At ("The Padishah's Three Daughters and the Horse"), collected from informant Gökcihan Çırakoğlu, a padishah has three daughters. The girls reach marriageable age, and the padishah asks his vizier to organize a feast and invite all young men of the country, for the princesses to shoot an arrow and marry whoever the arrow lands next to. The princesses walk into a balcony, ready their bows and shoot their arrows: the eldest's nears the great vizier and the middle one to a courtier. The padishah bids his cadette into shoot her arrow and it lands next to a horse near a garbage heap. She redoes her actions and still the arrow lands near the same horse. Convinced that this is her fate, the padishah moves her out to the stables to live with the horse. The princess accepts her fate, but laments that she got saddled with a horse she will have to groom and ride around. However, one night, she enters the stables and finds no sign of the horse, save for a young man. The young man tells her to keep the secret, since he is the horse and assumes equine form until midnight and human form until the roosters crow at dawn. The princess keeps his secret for months, a year even, and is happily smitten with the youth, thinking about her human husband. One day, while in the presence of her sisters, who are boasting about their respective spouses, the youngest princess blurts it out that the horse husband is a prince, then takes them to the stables to see him, in case they are still doubtful. However, the princess cannot find the horse prince anywhere in the stables. Realizing he has vanished, the princess tells her father she will go after him, even if he is behind Kaf Dag. She takes a horse and rides into the land of the devs, then meets a dev and asks for information about her husband. The dev says he knows of the horse prince's whereabouts, but he will give her three tasks first: (Note: The informant mentions that they forgot the third task.) she is to enter a house and sweep and not sweep; then fill a jar with her tears. The princess sits down to cry and ponders about the task, when an old woman passes by. She confides in the old woman, who advises her to take the broom and sweep using one side of the broom, then the other. For the second task, the old woman advises her to fill the jar, then pour a bit of salt inside. The princess fulfills both tasks, which appeases the dev, so he takes her to the horse prince, whom the dev kept imprisoned. The princess opens the door and reunites with her husband, then both ride her horse back to their homeland, where they hold a wedding for her.

=== Other regions ===
==== Europe ====
===== Greece =====
Italian author Luigi Bruzzano published a Greek variant from Calabria with the title Il bel Cavallo (Greek: Το μανόν άλογον, romanized: To máñon álogo; English: "Handsome Horse"), in journal La Calabria – Rivista di Letteratura Popolare. In this tale, a childless couple prays to God to give them a son, even it is a horse, so a horse is born. Just three days after being born, the horse asks his parents to find him a wife. They first bring him daughters of poor people, whom he kills. Finally, he is married to a suitable bride. He tells her his parents will throw a party; she will be there and he will come wearing blue garments; he will kiss her and, although his mother will beat her, she is not to reveal the man is their son. This happens two more times; him wearing green garments on the second time and white garments in the third time. The girl tells them the man is their son, the horse, but they only find the horse skin. Some time later, the girl looks for him with 7 iron canes and reaches the house of a Maga, who threatens to devour her, but her daughter takes her in as a servant. She then forces her to separate a mix of barley and lentils. Il bel Cavallo sees her and offers his help in exchange for a kiss; she declines, but he still helps her by summoning ants to separate the grains. Next, the Maga orders her to wash, rinse and dry a pile of clothes, then fill a mattress with bird feathers, and get the musical instruments from the house of the Maga's sister. Il bel Cavallo warns her that as soon as she enters the Maga's sister's house, the daughter will be by the oven; the human girl is to toss the daughter into the oven, get the musical instruments from under the oven and escape. She follows the instructions and gets the instruments, but, when she reaches the Maga's house, she lets the instruments escape from her hands. Il bel Cavallo places it into her hands. Finally, the Maga marries Il bel Cavallo to a cross-eyed woman, and forces the girl to hold two candles at the foot of the bridal bed. Richard McGillivray Dawkins reported the same tale, which he translated as Handsome Horse: the girl is married to an enchanted prince named Handsome Horse, who disappears "after the Cupid and Psyche manner". Afterwards, the girl finds him again, in his mother's house, an ogress. The ogress betrothes her son to a witch's daughter, and forces the girl to do impossible tasks.

===== Albania =====
Albanian folklorist Zihni Sako published an Albanian language tale titled Shamakadija, translated into Hungarian as Samakadi. In this tale, a king has three daughters and marries his elder two to a pasha's son and a minister (vizier)'s son. As for the youngest princess, when asked about her suitor of choice, she just declares she will marry a colt. The king questions her choice, but indulges her by saying she can marry the horse if it can eat barley and oats from her hands - instead of its usual diet of raisins and hazelnuts -, she can marry the colt. Of course, it happens so, and the third princess eventually marries the horse and moves out to a palace. As for the horse, it takes out the horseskin at night and becomes a handsome youth named Shamakadija. Some time later, war breaks out, and the king's sons-in-law join in the fight. Shamakadija joins in the fight in human form, battles his father-in-law's enemies, and is injured in the hand. The king dresses his wound, and he returns home. Shamakadija's two brothers-in-law wish to return home with some spoils of war, see Shamakadija with some enemies' heads, and ask him for some of them. Shamakadija agrees, as long as the brothers-in-law allow to be marked with his seal on their heads. A deal is made, and the three men march triumphantly to the king's castle. After they return, the king greets his sons-in-law, and the third princess tells her father the third man is her husband Shamakadija, the colt, who was the war's true victor. The king takes in the information, but decides to invite all three of them for a celebratory feast some days later. During the feast, the princess's elder sisters, after learning the truth of their brother-in-law, suggest the princess burns his horseskin to keep him human forever. Moved by their words, she asks her husband for the keys to their palace, since she forgot something. Shamakadija gives her the keys, but, suspecting something about his horseskin, warns her against doing anything (since the tale explains he is the son of a kuçedra). Despite his words, the princess goes back home and burns the horseskin, then returns to the feast. Suddenly, a kuçedra appears and takes Shamakadija with them. The princess cries over her actions, then puts iron shoes and begins a quest for him, following the directions her husband gave her. She walks and walks until she reaches the top of a hill, then calls out to Shamakadija. He climbs up the hill and they meet, him warning her about the danger of the kuçedra. The princess states she wants to be with him, despite the danger, and he turns her into an apple, then goes back home. Soon, the kuçedra, his mother, enters the house and smells a human's scent. Shamakadija makes his mother swear on his head not to harm his human wife, and changes the apple back into the princess. The kuçedra, secretly infuriated, begins to plot how it can devour the girl, and forces her on impossible tasks: first, she orders her to bake and not bake bread for them; next, to fill a bottle with her tears; thirdly, to clean the grains of wheat in the granary for a cake for one of the kuçedra's daughters. Shamakadija helps her in the tasks: first, he prepares the dough for her; next, he advises her to fill it with water and salt; thirdly, he summons the birds to clean out the grains. Still wanting to kill her daughter-in-law, she conspires with her sister and orders the princess to go there and ask for some bread dough to bake a wedding cake for one of her three kuçedra daughters. Before she goes to his aunt's house, Shamakadija intercepts her and advises her to clean out a dirty oven in the path, compliment a broken stone and use it on her face; compliment a broken gate. The princess follows his instructions, and a cat and mouse jump out of the oven and promise to help her. Past the stone and the gate, she reaches the kuçedra's sister's house and asks for the bread dough. The kuçedra's sister retires to a room to sharpen her teeth, while the mouse appears with the dough. The princess takes it and rushes back to the kuçedra's house, despite the creature's sister commanding the gate, the stone and the oven to stop her. Finally, the kuçedra orders the princess to make a glass room whose walls are strong enough to not break. As his mother leaves, Shamakadija tells his wife to gather a broom, some oil, soap and a comb in a bag, for they will escape, since this last task is impossible to fulfill. They flee from his family, but the kuçedra and its daughters chase after them. To stop his family, Shamakadija asks the princess to throw behind them the oil, the soap and the comb, which create a ravine, a slippery road and rivers. Lastly, they throw behind them the broom to create a large stream to separate them. Free at last, Shamakadija and the princess go to her father's castle and live their days in happiness.

===== Bulgaria =====
The horse-prince as the enchanted husband also appears in the Bulgarian tale corpus, under tale type 425B, "Момъкът с конската глава" or "Der Junge mit Pferdekopf" ("The Youth With the Horse's Head"). In the Bulgarian type, the heroine journeys after her husband and finds him in the house of his relatives, where she becomes their maidservant. Once there, she has to fulfill impossible tasks for his mother or his sister, which she accomplishes with her husband's help. At the end of the tale, the heroine and her husband interrupt his wedding to another bride and flee from his family by changing into objects and animals.

In a Bulgarian Romani variant, E Batiméskeri Paramísi ("The History of Batim"), translated as Die Geschichte von Batim and Batim The Horse (A Story from Bulgaria), a king owns a horse, which is the son of an ogre. One day, the servant who grooms it notices that when the horse saw the eldest daughter of the king, it became enamoured, and it won't eat its rations. The king orders his daughters to line up in a queue, to be given leblebi with nuts and to feed the horse with it; the animal only eats from the eldest's apron. They marry. The princess is despondent at first, but the horse takes off his equine disguise and becomes a man. He tells her that he will appear the next day as a fine knight with green garments and horses, and that she must not tell her sisters anything; otherwise, she will have to search for him in the land of Čine-ma-čine-džéza-davúlja. She obeys at first. The day after, he appears on a white horse and she lets her family in on the secret. He disappears, and she goes after him with shoes of iron and a staff of iron. She arrives at the land of Čine-ma-čine-džéza-davúlja, and stops by a fountain. She sees a servant fetching water and asks her to whom it is the jug; she answers it is for Batim (the horse's name). She drops her ring inside the jug and the servant brings the jug to Batim, who recognizes the ring. The princess meets him again, but he warns that his mother will eat her, and turns her into a pin to protect her. Batim asks his ogress mother to swear on his name not to harm her, and he shows her his human wife. The ogress mother forces her to do difficult tasks: to fill a tank with tears, to fill 41 rooms with feathers and let half remain over, to invite the ogress's sister and her brothers for a wedding feast - all accomplished with her husband's guidance. Lastly, Batim and his wife escape from the ogress by turning into objects to fool her. The third time, Batim turns into a flower and the wife into a rose-bush. The ogress comes to the rosebush and hesitates, for she might pick one or the other and hurt her son. She concedes defeat and lets her son live with his human wife.

In a Bulgarian tale titled "Царската дъщеря с железните дрехи" ("The Tsar's Daughter With Iron Clothes"), an old woman takes a czar's son as companion. One day, the youth wants her to ask for the tsar's daughter's hand in marriage. However, the tsar wants the youth to perform some tasks first: to erect a crystal palace that opens and closes on its own; a garden where it is raining, it is sunny, the birds sing and the trees bloom by themselves, and to build bridges across all lakes and rivers overnight. The tsar consents to their marriage. They marry and live with the old woman. One day, the tsar invites his daughter and son-in-law to his palace. The son-in-law takes with him a giant horse's head that he carelessly deposits somewhere in the palace. The servants, who were baking bread, see the horse's head and throw it in the oven. The prince warns his wife that the horse's head should not have been burnt, and that he will disappear; if she ever wants to find him again, she must wait 9 years, then ask for iron garments, iron shoes and an iron cane to be made; finally, she must always journey towards the sunrise, and look for him, whose name is "Öreg" ("старецътъ", in the original Bulgarian). Time passes and she goes on a journey: she visits three old women with giant spinning apparatuses and their cannibal sons, who direct the princess to Öreg. She reaches a well, where Öreg's nine servants and nine slaves come to fetch water. The princess begs for a drink and drops her ring in a jug. Öreg recognizes the ring and takes the princess into his castle as a servant. His mother suspects something amiss between her son and the girl. One day, Öreg is to be married to another woman; the man and the princess conspire to torch the bride's veil to cause a distraction during the wedding. The princess becomes a bridesmaid; when everyone is kissing the bride's veil, she asks to kiss it too, and torches the veil with a candle. Öreg and the princess escape from the wedding, but his family comes after them. The pair transforms into a lake (the princess) and a duck (him); a melon orchard (the princess) and a park-keeper (him), and finally a blackthorn bush with a thorny branch (the princess) and a giant grass snake wrapped around it (him). His mother ceases her pursuit and lets them be. The tale was translated into Hungarian with the title A vasruhás cárkisasszony ("The Tsar's Daughter with Iron Garments"), and to German as Die Zarentochter mit den eisernen Kleidern.

==== Caucasus Mountains ====
===== Ossetian people =====
In a tale from the Ossetians titled "Злотокудрый юноша" or "Златокудрый юноша" ("The Golden-Haired Youth"), an Aldar announces his intentions to marry his three daughters. The two elders find suitable husbands for themselves, while the youngest points to a lame and lousy horse grazing at the edge of the village. She marries the horse, and, at night, the horse takes off his skin to become a golden-haired youth, but, in the morning, wears the horseskin again. This goes on for some time, to the girl's grief. She consults with a кулбадагус ("kulbadagus"), who advises her to burn the horseskin. The girl lights a fire and tosses the animal skin to burn it. Her husband awakens, admonishes his wife, turns into a bird and flies away. Time passes, and the girl is grieving for her lost husband, when she sees a raven fly over. She asks the raven if it saw a golden-feathered bird. The raven says it didn't. Later, she asks a swallow, which also does not know, and finally a sparrow. The sparrow tells her it saw the golden-feathered husband, and that she can go to where he is by baking three honey cakes and praying to God to change her into a sparrow. The girl follows the instructions, turns into a bird, and, guided by the little bird, reaches a distant house. The sparrow says it must depart, but before it leaves, it advises the girl to enter the house where her husband is and to toss her ring into his jug. The girl turns back into human, enters the house and sees her husband; she tosses her golden ring inside the jug and hides. The husband wakes up, sees the ring in the jug, and beckons three times for his wife. She appears after the third call. The husband warns her that his mother, a creature with large tusks, will eat her, and bids her to hide. The mother enters the room and tells the golden-haired youth to show her where the girl is, since she can smell her. The youth makes his mother promise on her nameless sister not to harm his wife. The girl is introduced to her. Some time later, the mother forces her to clean their large house, by weeping over the floor then sweeping. Her husband tells her to sprinkle the floor with saltwater first. The mother then goes to sleep. The youth takes a dagger and kills the creature. Several skulls (from her victims) roll around the place. The youth takes a whip and cracks it against the skulls to resurrect the slain people. The youth explains that the creature was not his mother, but a witch who turned him into a lame horse.

==== Asia ====
===== Western Asia =====
According to researcher Samia Al Azharia Jahn, the supernatural bridegroom may appear as a horse, a goat or a camel in Arab variants.

===== Israel =====
Professors Yoel Shalom Perez and Judith Rosenhouse report an archival Jewish-Spanish tale from the Israel Folktale Archives (IFA), numbered IFA 12744. In this tale, titled The Camel Prince, a princess is married to a camel that becomes a man at night and remains an animal during the day. One day, the camel prince fights in a war to protect his father-in-law's kingdom and the princess betrays his secret, prompting his disappearance. The princess goes on a quest and does find him, but in the land of demons. There, the queen of demons takes the princess as a servant and orders her to perform some tasks, including getting a sieve by going to another demon's house. The queen of demons weds her own daughter to the camel prince, and forces the princess to dance with candles at the ceremony. However, the princess throws the candles at the demon bride and escapes with the camel prince. To delay their pursuers, the princess and the camel prince shapeshift into objects: a farmer and a plow, a baker and an oven, and a mosque and a muezzin.

===== Central Asia =====
Researcher Gabriele Keller argues that type TTV 98, "Pferdemann" (see above), is also "verbreitet" ("widespread") in Central Asia.

Scholar Isidor Levin translated and published a tale collected from a Tajik informant in Üratübe, modern day Istaravshan. In this tale, titled Sultan-scheckiger Hund ("Sultan Spotted Hound"), a man lives with his daughter. One day, the daughter enters a room and sees many flies buzzing around a youth lying there. She spends 39 days in this vigil, and buys a slavewoman to cover for her for a few hours, while she goes to comb her hair. The youth awakes on the 40th day and mistakes the slavewoman to be his saviour. The youth takes the slavewoman as his bride and the other girl as a servant. Later, he goes to a bazaar and buys a dress for the servant and a marble stone to the girl. The girl pours out her woes to the marble stone, which explodes due to the bile of the girl's words, and the youth, who is a prince, discovers the truth. He weds the girl who is his true saviour and takes her back to her father. The youth, called Sultan Spotted Hound, tells his wife that he becomes a man at night and a hound during the day, but she must not reveal the secret to anyone. The girl, now his wife, tells his secret to the people and burns the dogskin. He vanishes and she goes after him. She finds him again and is taken to his stepmother's house. The sultan's stepmother gives her two large pots and orders her to fill both with her tears. Her next task is for her to wash a piece of black felt white. Thirdly, the Sultan's stepmother sends the girl to her sister. The sultan asks her about this task and advises her: his wife is to go through the gates, exchange the correct fodder for the animals (clover for the horse, bones for the dog), wait to see if the aunt is asleep, then get a mirror, a comb and a whetstone. The girl gets the objects and brings to the Sultan, who was waiting for her. The sultan's aunt commands the door to stop her, to no avail. The sultan and his wife escape from his stepmother and her sister as quickly as they can, both sorceresses in pursuit. On the road, the Sultan and his wife throw behind them the objects to deter their pursuers: the whetstone creates a high mountain, the comb generates a steppe full of thorns, and the mirror a river between them. The Sultan and his wife trick the sorceresses into beating their heads against the mountain before climbing it and rolling on the steppe of thorns before crossing it. Finally, the sorceresses ask how the Sultan and his wife crosses the river, and he lies that he put stones in his pockets and around his neck. The sorceresses fall for the trick and drown. The Sultan waits until the river foams blood to confirm their death, and the couple return home.

== See also ==
- The King of Love
- Prince Wolf (Danish fairy tale)
- Tulisa, the Wood-Cutter's Daughter (Indian fairy tale)
- The Golden Root (Italian fairy tale)
- Habrmani (Armenian folk tale)
- Khastakhumar and Bibinagar
- The Son of the Ogress (Kabylian folk tale)
- Yasmin and the Serpent Prince (Iranian folktale)
- Baemsillang (The Serpent Husband)
- Amewakahiko soshi
- The Padisah's Youngest Daughter and Her Donkey-Skull Husband
- The Spotted Deer
- The Stone of Patience
- The Princess Who Could Not Keep a Secret
- Chötiktscha
