= Chötiktscha =

Uzbek fairy tale

Chötiktscha or Xo’tikcha (German: Eselkind; English: "Donkey-Child") is an Uzbek fairy tale. The story deals about a princess who marries a youth under an animal disguise, loses him due to her breaking his trust, and goes after him at his mother's home, where she is forced to perform hard tasks for her.

The tale belongs to the international cycle of the Animal as Bridegroom or The Search for the Lost Husband, wherein a human princess marries a supernatural husband, loses him, and goes on a quest to find him. It is also distantly related to the Graeco-Roman myth of Cupid and Psyche, in that the heroine is forced to perform difficult tasks for a witch or her mother-in-law.

== Sources ==
Researcher Gabriele Keller collected the tale from a source named Grandmother Matluba Usmonova.

== Summary ==
In this tale, the titular Chötiktscha is no ordinary animal; he, a donkey, falls in love with the padishah's daughter and asks his elderly owner to act as his Sovtschi (one that arranges a marriage) and request her hand in marriage. Despite her reservations, the old lady goes to the padishah's palace doors and, after a few days, is invited in to explain the reason for her visit. After divulging her motives, the padishah rejects the woman's proposal. Nevertheless, the old woman insists, and the padishah agrees—provided that her donkey first performs a series of tasks: he must bring a herd of lambs, oxen, camels, and a horse, and cause cooking oil to flow between their doors as if along a path. He completes these tasks and marries the princess in a grand ceremony, after which the princess goes to live with the donkey.

One day, the princess's mother visits her daughter and reveals that her husband is not an ordinary donkey; he removes the donkey skin at night to become a handsome youth—a Peri—and dons the donkey skin again in the morning. The princess's mother tells her that her father lives in shame because of her choice of husband and urges her to burn the donkey skin. Her husband learns of this and forbids her from doing so, warning that she will never see him again unless she wears out a cane until it is as small as a needle and shoes until they resemble a sieve. Despite his protests, the princess takes the donkey skin and burns it. The man laments this loss, transforms into a pair of doves, and flies away. Though her mother tries to comfort her by suggesting she can have any other man, the princess proclaims that she needs no one else and embarks on a quest, dressed as a dervish, to find him.

She journeys far and wide until she reaches an oasis where she rests in the shade of a tree, noticing that both the cane and the shoes are worn out. There, she sees a child (a girl) carrying an Oftoba (a water jug) to fetch water. When the princess asks whom the water is for, the girl replies that it is for her brother. The princess places her ring in the water jug, and the girl delivers it to her brother. Her husband, recognizing the ring, instructs his sisters to bring the dervish to him, and he recognizes the dervish as his wife. The story further explains that the princess's mother-in-law is a Dev.

The princess's husband hides her from his mother by transforming her into a broom, but later introduces her as his wife and makes his mother promise not to devour her. Sometime later, the Dev-mother orders the princess to visit her Dev sister and bring back a pair of scissors. The princess's husband advises her that she must pass by several landmarks: she is to compliment a broken bridge; a stream of blood named "Qonjiring" ("blood-stream"); a squeaking mosque called Ridscha; and a fallen door. She must also trade the animals' fodder (a plate for the dog, a jug for the stork), meet his cousin "Olti-Emtschak" ("The Six-Breasted One") and give her tools (an armguard and a handguard) to help clean the tandir oven; then, she must delouse his aunt on the clay terrace ("Supa"), tie her hair around the terrace, retrieve the scissors, and flee.

The princess follows these instructions, takes the scissors, and runs back to her mother-in-law's house. The Dev-aunt commands her daughter, the animals, the door, the mosque, the stream, and the bridge to stop her, but the princess escapes. The Dev-aunt then visits her sister, and together they plan to eat the princess that very night. At last, Chötiktscha takes his wife along with several objects (a comb, a mirror, and grains of salt) and both escape, with the Dev-family in pursuit. Chötiktscha throws the salt behind him to create a mountain, the comb to form a thornbush, and the mirror to create a river between them. When the Dev-relatives ask how he crossed the river, Chötiktscha suggests that his mother and his aunt put some stones in their pockets and cross it; consequently, the Dev-relatives sink to the bottom of the lake. Chötiktscha and his human wife return home and live happily ever after.

== Analysis ==
=== Tale type ===
Keller classified the tale as type AaTh 425B, "Die Aufgaben der Hexe (Hexensohn)" ("The Witch's Tasks (Son of the Witch)"), and Turkish Type TTV (EB) 98, "Pferdemann" ("Horse as Husband"), with elements of type AaTh 480 (helping and complimenting inanimate things on the way to the second witch) and conclusion as type AaTh 313, "The Magic Flight". She also noted that the description of Turkish type TTV 98, "Der Pferdemann", corresponded "almost exactly" to the story of Xo’tikcha.

In the Typen türkischer Volksmärchen ("Turkish Folktale Catalogue"), by Wolfram Eberhard and Pertev Naili Boratav, both scholars listed the variants with the horse husband under one type: TTV 98, "Der Pferdemann" ("The Horse Man"), (Note: In his monograph about Cupid and Psyche, Jan-Öjvind Swahn acknowledged that Turkish type 98 was his 425A, that is, "Cupid and Psyche", being the "oldest" and containing the episode of the witch's tasks.) which corresponded in the international classification to tale type AaTh 425. (Note: Some publications use the initials EB or EbBo to refer to their catalogue.) In most of the Turkish variants collected, the supernatural husband is a horse, followed by a man with a donkey's head and a camel. In other tales, he may be a snake, a frog or even Turkish hero Kaloghlan.

In his monograph on Cupid and Psyche, Jan-Öjvind Swahn acknowledged that Turkish type 98 represents subtype 425A in his analysis—that is, the "Cupid and Psyche" variant, considered the oldest and containing the episode of the witch's tasks. However, in the international index (ATU), Swahn’s classification is listed as type ATU 425B, "The Son of the Witch."

=== Motifs ===
According to Swedish scholar Jan Öjvind Swahn's study on Animal as Bridegroom tales, a characteristic motif that occurs in the "Indo-Persian" area is the heroine using a ring to signal her arrival to her husband, when she finds his location.

==== The heroes' Magic Flight ====
According to Christine Goldberg, some variants of the type 425B show as a closing episode "The Magic Flight" sequence, a combination that appears "sporadically in Europe", but "traditionally in Turkey". Although this episode is more characteristic of tale type ATU 313, "The Magic Flight", some variants of type ATU 425B also show it as a closing episode. German literary critic Walter Puchner argues that the motif attached itself to type 425B, as a Wandermotiv ("Wandering motif").

== Variants ==
Gabriele Keller argues that type TTV 98, "Pferdemann" (see above), is also "widespread" ("verbreitet", in the original) in Central Asia.

=== Uzbekistan ===
==== Ilon Oga ====
In an Uzbek tale collected by folklorist Mansur Afzalov with the Uzbek title "Илон ога" (transliteration: "Ilon oga"; Russian: Змей господин, romanized: Zmey gospodin, lit. 'Serpent Master'), an old man lives with his wife and three daughters. One day, he plans to go to the market and asks his three daughters what he can bring them. The elder asks for a piece of satin, the middle one for a bridegroom, and the youngest for an apple. He finds the satin and a fiancé, but not the apple. A hermit tells the man to harvest in his garden an apple. The man goes to the hermit's orchard to get an apple, and a serpent coils around the tree. The animal asks the man to whom he plans to give the apple. The man says it is for his daughter, and the serpent asks for the man's daughter, for he will give a xurjin (a saddlebag) of apples. Thinking nothing of the deal, he agrees and gets a bag full of apples. Back home, the man and his family are greeted by the serpent's matchmakers, but the man refuses to give up his daughter. The matchmakers tell their master of the man's refusal, and the serpent promises to make the man and his family so poor he will have to give up his daughter. The serpent fulfills his promise and the man agrees to deliver his daughter to the serpent. The serpent is brought to the man's daughter under a cloth. Her mother cries over her youngest daughter's fate. After the matchmakers and the mother leave, the snake becomes a handsome youth and tells his bride to close every door and window, and warns her not to take out his snake scales from under the pillow, lest he disappears and she will have to seek him out with an iron cane, an iron veil and iron shoes. One of the women comes to the bride and convinces her to burn the snake scales. The maiden takes the scales and burns it in the fireplace. The serpent master smells the burning and reminds his bride of his warning, then turns into a moth and flies away. The maiden asks her father to prepare iron garments for her long, 40 days journey to find him. She passes by a herd of camels, a herd of horses and a herd of deer, and each servant tells her the herds belong to "Brother Snake". She reaches his house, but does not enter it, instead waiting by a fountain. A boy servant comes to fetch water, and tells the maiden the water is for his master, "Brother Snake". The maiden asks for a drink and tosses her ring into the jug. The boy servant takes the jug back to the serpent master, he finds the ring and goes outside. He warns his mother is "Baba-Yaga" (in the Russian translation), who may devour her, so he will hide his human bride into a chest before the witch comes. He also teaches her that his mother will ask her to go to his aunt to fetch some items to wash her hair. The serpent master does exactly that. His mother, "Baba Yaga", comes like a whirlwind and smells a human scent. The serpent master introduces his bride to her. The witch orders her human daughter-in-law to go to the witch's sister and fetch from there spoiled milk, a mirror, a comb, a bar and black and white threads. Following her husband's previous advice, the maiden eats a piece from a clay fence and compliments it, drinks a sip from a basin of foul water and compliments it, gently opens a gate, enters the aunt's palace and gives a bone to the dog and hay to the horse, and delouses his aunt. While the aunt is distracted, the maiden ties her hair to some trees, gets the items and flees. She meets her husband next to a horse and both escape. The aunt and the mother run after them, but the serpent master throws behind the spoiled milk to create an icy surface, a comb to create thickets, and a mirror to create a lake to delay them. From the other side of the lake, the aunt and the mother ask how the serpent master crossed it, and he says he put some stones in his clothes and swam. The witches follow his suggestion and drown. The serpent master and the maiden return home.

==== Yılan Damat ====
In an Uzbek tale titled Yılan Damat (İlan Kuyav, "Snake Groom"), a padishah has three daughters. One day, a large dragon ("ejderha") appears and threatens to destroy the kingdom unless he is given one of his daughters. The monarch asks his daughters which will go with the dragon, and only the youngest replies. The princess marries the dragon, who is in reality a handsome youth underneath the draconic skin. She tells this information to her sisters, who, out of jealousy, advise her to burn the dragonskin. The human dragon warns his wife not do it, for he will disappear and she will only find him again by wearing down a pair of iron sandals and an iron cane. He also gives her his ring. Despite his warning, the princess goes through with the deed, and her husband vanishes. After a period or mourning, the princess dons the iron sandals and iron cane and begins her journey. She passes by herds of horses, cattle and sheep - all belonging, she learns, to her husband Şah Kamber. Finally, she reaches a spring, where a servant is drawing water for Şah Kamber, asks him for some and drops his ring inside it. The servant takes the jug to Şah Kamber, who recognizes the ring and goes to meet his human wife. Şah Kamber takes his wife to meet his mother and introduces them to each other. However, his mother soon plans to get rid of the girl, for she wants to marry her son to another female member of her family. First, she orders the girl to fetch some cotton for pillows - Şah Kember advises his wife to go the plain and shout that Şah Kamber is dead, and all the birds will give their feathers. Next, the woman orders the girl to fetch a pair of scissors. Sah Kamber intercepts his wife and advises her how to proceed: she will pass by a door that is always opening and shutting, which she is to compliment by saying it is fit for a lodge; pass by a bridge and compliment it; exchange the fodder between two animals (bone for a dog, straw for a camel), meet an old woman, greet her and agree to delouse her hair; while the old woman is distracted, the princess is to tie strands of her hair to the pillars, get the scissors and escape. The princess does as instructed, steals the scissors, and goes to meet Şah Kamber. Both then escape to another city. The tale was also classified as Turkish tale type EB 98, "Pferdemann".

=== Uzbeks in Afghanistan ===
In a tale collected from an Uzbek source in Afghanistan with the title "پادشاهنینگ قیزی و لوله پری خان", translated as Padişahın Kızı Ve Loleperihan ("The Padishah's Daughter and Loleperihan"), a padishah has five daughters, one with five and another with four eyes. One day, his cadette is working in the farms when a horse appears and helps her. For this, he says he wants to marry her. The princess agrees, but asks her father first. The padishah forbids it, since it is dishonorable. The girl promises to kill herself if she does not marry the horse, so the padishah relents and lets her marry the equine. The horse takes her to his castle, which is filled with dogs and many herds of cattle (cows, sheep, camels, donkeys) and chickens. After forty days, the padishah goes to look for her and finds the castle. The princess invites her father, slaughters some animals for the meal and they talk. After three nights, the girl tells her father she misses her mother, so the monarch promises to send her mother to pay her a visit. The monarch returns home and tells his wife about their cadette who misses her. The princess's four-eyed and five-eyed sisters overhear their conversation, and in the following morning, say they want to join their mother in visiting their youngest sister. The princess suspects the sisters plan something, but welcomes them. During their conversation, the sisters ask the princess how they can burn the horse husband's clothes, and she bring the answers the next day: with pistachio peels and hawthorn berries. The sisters try to burn it, but the horseskin is still intact, so they ask the princess again. This time, they obtain the right answer: with pistachio peels and onion peels. The duo take the horseskin that belongs to their brother-in-law, Loleperihan, and burn it. Loleperihan goes to look for his horseskin, does not find it, and blames his wife for this, admonishing for breaking his trust and revealing the secret. He takes out a pearl from his mouth, gives it to his wife, and curses the castle and their possessions to disappear. He vanishes.

The princess is left alone in the wilderness, then returns to her family. Her sisters pester her, and she decides to look for her husband. Meanwhile, Loleperihan has married the daughter of an Albasti. The princess reaches a pool and finds a maidservant of Albasti's coming to draw water for Loleperihan's ablutions. The princess asks for water, but the maidservant refuses her, so the princess curses the water to become pus. The maidservant pour out the pus on Loleperihan's hands, so he complains and sends her back to fetch clean water. The princess asks again for water and, on being refused, curses the water to become pus again. The maidservant informs Loleperihan about the stranger at the pool and he orders her to give water to them. The princess finally drinks some water and drops her husband's pearl into the jug. Loleperihan recognizes the pearl when it drops in his hands. Loleperihan goes to meet with his wife by the pool, and warns her that he will talk to the Albasti to smooth thing over. Loleperihan talks to the Albasti that he found a maid for her daughter and makes her promise not to devour her. Albasti notices the princess's beauty and conspires with her own daughter to get rid of them. First, they send her to fetch bird feathers from a certain cliff - a trap, since the area is full of hungry wolves. Loleperihan tells his wife to go to another cliff, since it is safer. Next, they send her to fetch another bag of feathers, this time from a nightingale, from another cliff. Her husband intercepts her and advises her to go to another cliff. Failing that, the Albasti and her daughter cannot renege on her vow, and conspire to send the princess to her aunt, who has not made the same vow. Thus, they order the girl to go to the Albasti's sister to fetch yeast.

Loleperihan intercepts his wife, warns her this is a trap, and advises her how to proceed: since the Albasti's aunt mistreats a crooked tree, a pool, a bridge, a broken door, and starves a camel and a dog, the princess is to pass by a pool of dirty water, drink from it and compliment it; pass by the bridge and compliment it; kiss the crooked spot on the mulberry tree and compliment it, pass by the broken door and praise it, exchange the fodder between the camel and the dog (straw for the camel, bone for the dog), and enter Albasti's house; sweep the house, tie her hair to the column, steal the yeast and return home. She follows the instructions to the letter, ties the Albasti's aunt's hair to the columns, steals the yeast and rushes back, the creature ordering her servants to stop the princess, to no avail.

Finally, Loleperihan buys a saw, an axe, a mirror and a comb from the market, and lies to the Albasti woman he needs to discuss with the Albasti's daughter. He takes her to the bathroom, asks her to show her tongue and bites it off. The Albasti's daughter falls to the ground, bleeding; a pigeon appears and Loleperihan cuts it off, then takes his human wife and flees from the house. Albasti enters the bathroom, sees her fainted daughter and chases after the escaping couple. Loleperihan and the princess throw the saw behind them to create thorns. Albasti asks how they crossed, and Loleperihan lies that they rolled among them. Next, they throw behind the comb to create a salt marsh. Thirdy, they throw behind the axe, creating thorns which the Albasti crosses. Lastly, they throw behind the mirror create a vast sea between them. The Albasti asks them how they crossed the sea, and Loleperihan lies that they tied some millstones around their neck and crossed. The Albasti does so and sinks to the bottom. Loleperihan and the princess return home and regain their former life. The tale was collected from a 53-year-old source named Gülafroz, from Hocasabzpoş district, in Faryab province, in 2018, who heard it from her grandmother.

== See also ==
- The Horse-Devil and the Witch
- The Padisah's Youngest Daughter and Her Donkey-Skull Husband
- The Princess Who Could Not Keep a Secret
- The Tale of Aftab
- The Spotted Deer
- The Stone of Patience
