= The Spotted Deer =

Turkish fairy tale

The Spotted Deer (Turkish: Alageyikli) is a Turkish fairy tale published by author Ali Rıza Yalgın. The story is about a princess who marries a youth under an animal disguise, loses him due to her violating his trust, and goes after him at his mother's home, where she is forced to perform hard tasks for her.

The tale belongs to the international cycle of the Animal as Bridegroom or The Search for the Lost Husband, wherein a human princess marries a supernatural husband, loses him, and goes on a quest to find him. It is also distantly related to the Graeco-Roman myth of Cupid and Psyche, in that the heroine is forced to perform difficult tasks for a witch or her mother-in-law.

== Publication ==
The tale was originally published by Ali Rıza Yalgın with the title Alageyikli. German folklorist Otto Spies translated it as Der gescheckte Hirsch ("The Spotted Deer").

== Summary ==
In this tale, the padishah has three daughters. Each of the princesses orders the Wasir to give a melon to their father, to see their marriageability. The padishah, then, summons every man and youth from the kingdom to the palace, so that his daughters can choose their husbands by throwing apples. The elder two throw theirs and find two Wasir sons as bridegroom, and the youngest throws hers to a person named Keloğlan ("Bald-Headed"). The youngest throws her apple again, and again it falls near the same person, so they believe he is her destined mate. They marry. After they enter the bridal chambers, the youth takes out a feather and shakes it. He becomes a young man. The princess asks him about his origins, and he answers that he is called Alageyik ("spotted deer", "fallow deer"), the son of the Dev-mother ("Dewenmutter") from Mount Kâf; his mother is the Sultana ("Sultanin") Tepegöz, who rules over eighteen mountains; and tells her not to share his secret with anyone, lest he vanishes and she has to seek him.

One day, the padishah becomes ill, and his doctor prescribe he should drink deer milk to cure him. So his three sons-in-law are sent to look for deer milk, Keloglan on a lame mule, and the other two on fine horses. Keloglan burns a feather, teleports to Mount Qaf, gets the deer milk and brings it to his father-in-law. The other two sons-in-law bring milk that is either too sweet, or too bitter, but the milk Keloglan brought heals the king. Later, the padishah organizes an equestrian game with javelins, and a mysterious youth takes part in the festivities, amazing the padishah with his prowess. The youngest princess is proud of the youth's talent, as he is her husband, and reveals her husband's secret. For this, her husband does not return home at night, and she decides to seek him out with iron shoes and an iron cane.

The princess passes by the Copper Palace by the Copper Mountain, where no one knows the "Emir of Mount Kâf" (her husband), and by the Silver Mountain, where she is directed to the land of the Dews, in Mount Kâf. The princess stops by a fountain in a village. Meanwhile, her husband, the Emir, goes to fetch water from the fountain, and sees his wife. He turns her into a ball of yarn and brings it to his house, where he announces to his mother that he has found a maidservant in need of work.

The next day, his mother, who is a man-eating creature, gives the princess a broom decorated with pearls and gemstones and commands her to sweep a room. The princess gets the broom, but it "dissolves" in her hands. Her husband comes to her, uses a feather and the broom sweeps the room. The next day, the Dev-mother orders the princess to fill two vases with her tears. The Emir tells her to mix salt in water. On the third day, the mother orders the princess to go to her sister and get some musical instruments from there for her son's upcoming marriage. The Emir instructs the princess: close an open door and open a closed one; give the grass to a horse and meat for the dog; drink from a fountain of blood and wash her face in a fountain of pus; enter his aunt's house and, while she is away sharpening her teeth, get the bright box and flee. The princess follows the instructions to the letter and brings it to the Dev-mother.

Finally, the Dev-mother decides to marry her son, the Emir, to another Dev-woman. That same night, the Emir takes his human wife and flies away on a flying jug. His mother goes after him on another. The Emir sees her and turns his wife into a poplar tree and himself into a snake coiled around the tree. The Dev-mother tells the pair she wants to give her son a kiss; the Emir, metamorphosed into a snake, spits venom at his mother's mouth and bites her tongue, and she dies. The Emir and his human wife return to her father's kingdom, where they learn the padishah has died, but wanted his third son-in-law to ascend to the throne after him.

== Analysis ==
=== Tale type ===
Scholars Wolfram Eberhard and Pertev Naili Boratav, establishers of the Turkish Foltkale Catalogue, (Note: Some publications use the initials EB or EbBo to refer to their catalogue.) classified the episode of the quest for the remedy to the king as tale type TTV 257, Die Löwenmilch ("Lion's Milk"), of the Turkish Folktale Catalogue. The tale then segues into tale type TTV 98, "Der Pferdemann". German folklorist Hans-Jörg Uther, in a review of Otto Spies's translated book, classified it as Turkish type EB 98.

In his monograph about Cupid and Psyche, Jan-Öjvind Swahn acknowledged that Turkish type 98 was subtype 425A of his analysis, that is, "Cupid and Psyche", being the "oldest" and containing the episode of the witch's tasks. In the international index, however, Swahn's typing is indexed as type ATU 425B, "The Son of the Witch".

=== Motifs ===
==== The supernatural husband ====
In most of the variants collected, the supernatural husband is a horse, followed by a man with a donkey's head and a camel. In other tales, he may be a snake, a frog, or even Turkish hero Kaloghlan. In some tales, the heroine chooses her future supernatural husband by throwing an object, like a dart, an arrow or a handkerchief.

==== The heroine's tasks ====
Another motif that appears in the tale type is that the heroine must travel to another witch's house and fetch from there a box or casket she must not open. German folklorist Hans-Jörg Uther remarked that these motives ("the quest for the casket" and the visit to the second witch) are "the essential feature" of the subtype.

==== The heroes' Magic Flight ====
According to Christine Goldberg, some variants of the type show as a closing episode "The Magic Flight" sequence, a combination that appears "sporadically in Europe", but "traditionally in Turkey". As their final transformation to deceive the ogress mother, the princess becomes a tree and her supernatural husband becomes a snake coiled around it. Although this episode is more characteristic of tale type ATU 313, "The Magic Flight", some variants of type ATU 425B also show it as a closing episode. German literary critic Walter Puchner argues that the motif attached itself to type 425B, as a Wandermotiv ("Wandering motif").

== Variants ==
=== Tales about Dev husband ===
==== Dev Yavrusu ====
In a Turkish tale collected from informant Zeynep Doğan, from Adıyaman, with the title Dev Yavrusu ("The Young Dev"), an old couple walks somewhere and the woman complains about her thirst. She then drinks some water from a dev's footprint, and, nine months later, gives birth to a son in dev form. When he is three years old, he goes to the mountains in the morning, and returns at night. When he is twenty years old, he asks his parents to find him a bride, and suggests the local pasha's daughter. His parents question his choice, but he fills a basin of gold and tells his parents to take is as a gift to the pasha. His mother goes to the palace to give him the basin, but, on finding the monarch in prayer, she leaves the object there and goes home before she is found out. The next day, the giant son gives another golden basin to his mother and sends her again, and again the monarch is in prayer, but this time the concubines spot her. The third day, the woman goes to the palace again with the golden basin, and the concubines capture her and take her to the pasha. She explains her son wishes to marry his daughter. The pasha agrees, but sets three tasks: first, for him to build a palace more magnificent than the pasha's and surrounded by trees, in a way the princess's feet cannot touch the ground; second, furnish the mansion with a carpet so that half remains empty; thirdly, provide a cluster of grapes for his soldiers to eat and not diminish the fruits. The giant son provides the three requests (he uses a neighbour's hand mill for the palace, and asks his mother to buy a carpet and a grape for the other two). Resigned, the pasha marries his daughter to the giant son. On the wedding night, the giant son takes off his skin and becomes a handsome youth, then puts on the disguise in the morning. After six months, the pasha pays a visit to his daughter and asks her about her husband. The princess reveals about the giant's skin, and the pasha suspects the disguise is in the house somewhere. He finds it up a pillar and burns it. The giant son, without his skin, returns at night and discovers his disguise is burnt, then blames his wife for it, telling her he will depart and she will only find him if she wears down a pair of iron shoes. He then leaves. After he vanishes, she dons the iron shoes and makes a long journey, until, feeling tired, stops to rest by a tree. Her husband, Dev Yavrusu finds his wife near the tree and says he is living with a witch who wants to marry him to her daughter, but he will ask if he can take his human wife in. After he explains the situation, the witch agrees to take her in as a servant, and forces her on tasks. First, the witch gives the princess a black cloth and orders her to wash it white, for she will use it to make a quilt for her daughter. The princess takes the black cloth to the river; her husband utters a spell, then throws it in the river, where it becomes white.

Next, she orders her to gather bird feathers for a pillow. The princess tells her husband about the task, he spreads wheat grains and attracts the birds, ordering them to give their feathers. Next, the witch orders the girl to fetch a drum for the upcoming wedding. The princess does not know where to find one, so her husband advises her how to proceed: walk until she finds a river of pus and blood which she is to compliment, wash her face with it and drink from it; compliment a blackthorn, exchange the fodder between two animals (meat for a lion, hay for a horse), clean out a dirty sackcloth, reach a village where the witch's elder daughter lives and ask for the drum; refuse her invitation to come in and, while she exits the room to sharpen her teeth, steal the drum from a calabash behind the door and rush back. The princess does as instructed and brings the drum back, despite the witch's elder daughter commanding her servants to stop her. At last, the witch marries Dev Yavrusu to her daughter, but Dev Yavrusu tricks her, saying the wedding couple and their servant must spend three nights in the same room, as is costumary. The witch allows it. Later that night, Dev Yavrusu kills the bride and escapes with his human wife back to her kingdom. Back to the witch, she notices how long it has passed since the wedding night, and finds her daughter is dead. The witch's other daughter promise to avenge their sister and chase after Dev Yavrusu and the princess. On the road, the couple shapeshift into other people to trick their pursuers: first, a garden (the princess) and an old gardenkeeper (Dev Yavrusu); next, a small fountain (her) and a pumpkin (him); lastly, into a poplar tree (the princess) and a dragon ("ejderha", in the original) surrounding it (Dev Yavrusu). The witch herself reaches them, and Dev Yavrusu, conceding defeat, asks her for a last kiss, since he knows they will be devoured. The witch agrees to it and opens her mouth; Dev Yavrusu bites the witch's tongue and she dies. The tale ends.

==== Süllü Yusuf ====
In a Turkish tale collected from informant Zülbiye Arslen from Nigde with the title Süllü Yusuf, a childless poor woman prays to Allah to have a child, even if he is a Dev. Thus, she is granted one. The Dev son grows up and she places him in the barn. One day, the princess is throwing out some ashes when she notices a light in the distance: it is the Dev. The Dev meets the princess and says he is a youth on the inside, but she must not tell his secret, lest he turns into a dove and fly to the land of the Devs. Later, the Dev son tells his mother he wants to marry the princess. His mother goes to talk to the padishah, who notices the poor woman's status. The princess appears from her window and says she wants to marry the Dev, and their wedding is celebrated. The princess's mother asks her about her husband, but she will not talk about him. She then sends her other daughter to spy on the wedding couple: the princess's husband removes the Dev disguise and becomes a handsome human youth. However, he notices his secret is out, turns into a dove, and flies away to the land of the devs. The princess laments the fact to her mother-in-law and her mother, then dons iron sandals and walks with an iron cane in search for him. She walks until the iron cane is but a stick in her hands, and sees a group of dev women fetching water with many jugs. She asks the one with the golden jug if she can have some, but the girl directs her to the one with the brass jug ("ibrikli"). This goes on with the other maidservants carrying metal and wooden pitchers, when the girl with the golden pitcher, who is the Dev king's daughter, mentions Süllü Yusuf's name. The princess hears the name and asks the girl where he is. The dev girl takes the princess to the garden, where Süllü Yusuf is digging up gold.

The couple reunites, but Süllü Yusuf warns the princess the Dev king has betrothed him to his daughter, and they must escape. The Dev King then orders the princess to make a feather bed for his daughter, or he will devour her. Süllü Yusuf finds his human wife crying, says a prayer and the birds come to give their feathers. Next, the Dev king orders the princess to fill cauldrons with her tears. The princess cries over a cauldron and cannot fill it, so Süllü Yusuf says another prayer, and a fountain springs forth. Thirdly, the Dev King orders the princess to go to his aunt's house and fetch a rolling pin and a baking tray. Süllü Yusuf advises the princess how to proceed: exchange the fodder between two animals (bone for a dog, clover for a horse), open a closed door and close an open one, pass through the metal and wooden doors, get the utensils, rush back, and look neither right, nor left. The princess follows his instructions to the letter, gets the utensils, and rushes back, the Dev's aunt commanding the doors and animals to stop her, to no avail. Finally, the Dev king tells the princess he will use her as dowry for his daughter's wedding. Süllü Yusuf advises her to hold still, go in the ashtray and curl up, for the fire of the tandoor will not harm her. It happens thus, and the princess leaves unscathed. The Dev king then locks up his daughter with Süllü Yusuf in their room. Süllü Yusuf tricks the Dev bride into praying with a covering, and while he is distracted, Süllü Yusuf turns himself and the princess into two doves and both fly away through an opening. The Dev king's daughter realizes Süllü Yusuf escapes and her father sends his soldiers after them. On the road, Süllü Yusuf and the princess transform into a pair of fountains, then a pair of bushes to trick the Dev army, and finally reach the princess's kingdom, where they remarry in a seven-day celebration.

==== Şah Ismayıl ====
In a Turkish tale collected from informant Türkan Ünal, in Karakuyu village, with the title Şah Ismayıl ("Shah Ismayil"), there live two dev sisters who wish to wed their children to each other: one's dev son to the other's dev daughter. However, the dev son, called Shah Ismayil, loves a neighbour's daughter and marries her, to his relatives' chagrin. Shah Ismayil takes his bride home and leaves to hunt in the mountains. However, the girl is hounded by her female in-laws for ruining their plans, and his mother forces her on hard tasks: first, to fill six mattresses with bird feathers for their house. The girl cries for the impossibility of the task, when Shah Ismayil appears to her. She tells him about the task, and Shah Ismayil promises to help her by saying a prayer at dawn for the birds to shed their feathers for her. It happens thus and the girl fills the mattress with feathers. Her female in-laws suspect that it was Shah Ismayil's doing. Next, the pair orders the girl to fill five large jars with her tears. The girl cries again for she cannot possibly fulfill the task, when Shah Ismayil appears again and explains he will buy some salt for her to mix it with water to pass it off as her tears. It also happens thus. His female relatives keep hounding and punishing the girl, until the day when Shah Ismayil admits defeat and announces he wishes to marry his cousin. His mother and aunt agree and marry their children. However, Shah Ismayil beheads his cousin, hides her head in a bag and nails it to the bathroom door, then escapes with his real wife away from his home. His female relatives listen to the dripping and think Shah Ismayil is taking a bath, but, some days later, realize he is taking too long and find out the dev daughter her been killed and go after the escaping couple. On the road, Shah Ismayil notices they are being pursued and transforms himself and his wife into a rosebud (her) and a snake coiled around it (himself). His mother and aunt soon reach the couple and ask Shah Ismayil for a kiss, but the man, in snake form, hisses to keep them away from his wife. Defeated, the dev-mother and dev-aunt fly away back home, while Shah Ismayil and his wife are free to live their lives.

==== Haydarova Değirmen Hikâyesi ====
In a Turkish tale collected in Yıldızeli from storyteller Atıfet Bildik, with the title Haydarova Değirmen Hikâyesi, a Dev couple wish to marry their son: the wife wants a Dev bride, while the husband wishes to marry his son to a Turkish girl. However, the Dev son states he wants a bride that is both Turkish and a Dev. The Dev parents agree to their son's wishes and organize a wedding. However, the Dev mother will not accept her son's decision, and plots to destroy her prospective daughter-in-law: first, she sends the Turkish girl to her own daughter's house, so that the Dev daughter can devour the bride, for her to take the tambourine and the drum and return. The Turkish girl returns. Next, they proceed with the wedding, but the Dev mother ties her prospective daughter-in-law inside the hearth and lights it on fire to burn her. The Dev son comes in, rescues his wife and both flee. The following morning, the Dev family notices the couple has escaped, and the Dev matriarch sends her husband after them. On the road, the couple realize they are being pursued and change shape to elude his father: they turn into a garden (her) and a gardener (him). After bring tricked once, the Dev matriarch sends her husband after the couple again. On the second time, the couple shapeshift into a bathhouse (her) and a bathhouse attendant (him). The Dev father goes for a wash and returns home. After her husband is tricked twice, the Dev matriarch decides to chase after her son herself. On the road, the Dev son notices his mother is approaching, so he turns his wife into a cypress tree and himself into a snake, then says he can bite his mother to make her leave. The Dev mother approaches the tree and notices her daughter-in-law became the tree, so she tries to knock it down. However, her son, in snake form, lunges at her. The Dev mother leaves, calling her son's name, Haydarova, and saying he attacked her. The tale ends.

=== Tales about skull husband ===
==== Kuru Kafa Mehmet Çağ ====
In a Turkish tale collected from an informant in Kahramanmaraş with the title Kuru Kafa Memmet Çağ ("The Skull Mehmet Çağ"), a shepherd is working, when one day a skull appears to him from the graveyard, saying it is bored, so he decides to become the man's son and help in his chores. The man agrees and takes the skull with him to his wife. Some time later, the skull asks his adoptive mother to court the padishah's daughter on his behalf. Despite some reservation, the woman goes to the padishah's court and proposes on his behalf. The padishah agrees, but wants to see the prospective suitor in the flesh. Thus, a handsome youth comes in through the door: it is Mehmet Çağ, whom the story describes as the son of the padishah of the peris, whom his mother cursed into skull form. The padishah's daughter, the princess, falls in love with him at first sight and both marry. Later, now back to human form, Mehmet Çağ tells his wife he will return to his home village and visit his mother, and tells her not to come looking for him in case he does not come back. Mehmet Çağ departs, and the princess keeps waiting for him for weeks, and he does not come back. Thus, she commissions from a blacksmith a pair of iron shoes and an iron cane, and goes after him.

The princess goes on a long journey and passes first by a clay castle, where a maidservant is fetching water with a clay jar. She asks for a drink of water and information about Mehmet Çağ, but the girl has not seen him. She then reaches a castle of silver, where she is treated the same way by a maidservant fetching water in a silver jar. Finally, she reaches a golden castle, where she finds the iron garments are worn out, just as a maidservant is fetching water in a golden jug, but says there is no one named Mehmet Çağ in the castle. The maidservant then returns home and tells Mehmet Çağ there is someone looking for him outside. The story then explains Mehmet Çağ is to marry a bride of his mother's choosing. He goes outside and reunites with his human wife, but admonishes her that she indeed went after him. He brings her in and his mother, reluctantly, takes her in to be another servant. Some time later, she orders the princess to fetch feathers for a new mattress for her son. Mehmet Çağ advises his wife to go to a certain place and call on the birds, saying that Mehmet Çağ sends his regards, and they will give their feathers. The princess does as instructed and brings the feathers, to the woman's consternation that her son taught her that. Next, she conspires with her sister have the princess fail: they order her to wash and clean every object in the house - Mehmet Çağ advises her to go next to the shore and summon the peris (fairies) to help her. Thirdly, the woman orders the princess to fetch a sifting sieve from a sister that lives in a distant place - Mehmet Çağ intercepts his wife and advises her how to proceed: pass by a river of blood which she is to drink from, saying it is wine; pass by a river of pus and drink from it, saying it is yoghurt; compliment a bush saying that it is a rose, exchange the fodders between two animals (meat for a dog, grass for a horse), open a closed door and shut an open one. The princess follows the instructions to the letter, gets the sieve and escapes, her mother-in-law's sister commanding her servants to stop the human, to no avail.

Mehmet Çağ is forced to marry his cousin, and both enter the wedding chambers, but he asks for his mother to let their new servant accompany them and sleep on a nearby bed. At night, Mehmet kills his cousin, arranges her body on the bed, and escapes with his human wife. The next day, his mother knocks on the couple's door and discovers his niece's body, then sends some soldiers after her son and his wife. On the road, in order to trick his mother's soldiers, he turns himself and the princess into a ladle and a fountain, then into an orchard and a garden-keeper. Finally, after the soldiers return empty-handed, Mehmet Çağ's mother run after the couple. As a final transformation, he turns the princess into a poplar ("kavak", in the original) and himself into a snake ("yilan") coiled around it. Mehmet Çağ's mother stops before the tree and threatens the couple, but Mehmet, in snake form, asks for a last kiss from his mother, which she allows. When she opens her mouth, Mehmet, in snake form, bites her and she dies. The couple then return home.

==== Kelle ====
In a Turkish tale collected from an informant from Çankiri with the title Kelle, and couple have three daughters who each do their chores. The youngest daughter goes to sweep the garden and finds a single coin, which she pockets. The next day, and in the following days, she keeps finding a single golden coin, until they stop appearing. Later, she is walking on the road, when she hears a clicking sound near her, but cannot find anything that produces such noise. Later, she goes to take some food to her father and finds a skull ("guru gafa", in the original) on the road. She then goes to sweep the garden again and finds more money this time, eight or ten coins she gives to her mother. Soon enough, the skull appears again next to the girl and turns into a handsome youth in a puff of smoke. The youth explains he is neither dev nor jinn, but a simple human like her, cursed into that form he must stay under for another forty days until he marries and his wife keeps his secret. As time passes, the girl and the youth inside the skull spend time together and she decides to marry him. Being the most beautiful of her sisters, the elder two begin to envy and mock their cadette for marrying a strange husband. There is only the skull-shaped creature home, and they mock the girl for it. As the end of the curse is approaching, the youth warns his wife to keep his identity a secret until then. However, she cannot endure her sisters' mockery again and reveals the skull's secret, prompting his disappearance.

She consults a wise man on how she can find her husband, and is advised to walk in iron shoes, with an iron cane until both are worn down. The girl's sisters are sorry for their part in their brother-in-law's vanishing and try to dissuade her, but she decides to soldier on: she commissions the iron apparel from her father and begins her long journey. One day, she stops to rest under a tree, when she notices the stick is slightly crooked and the shoes have a small hole on their soles. She also spots a bird perched on the tree who begins to talk to her: it is her husband, warning her against his mother, since he is marrying a bride of her choosing. He turns his human wife into a bird and both fly to his mother's house. The human skull's mother knows the newcomer is her son's wife, and begins to order her around, like going to an uncle and going to an aunt to get a rolling pin. Her husband intercepts her and advises her how to proceed: exchange the fodder between two animals (meat for a lion, grass for a cow). The girl follows the instructions and reaches her aunt-in-law's house to steal the rolling pin, but climbs up some steps of a rundown staircase and compliments it. She fetches the rolling pin and rushes back, the aunt commanding the staircase and the animals to stop her, to no avail. Finally, the human skull's mother ties candles to the girl's fingers, which she is to hold until they melt during the night, and places her in a corner of the room. The human skull asks his wife the reason for this, and the girl says his mother put her up to it. The youth says it is a trap, since she intends to kill her, puts out the candles and both escape. On the road, he notices they are being pursued by his family in the shape of birds, and transforms themselves into a tree (her) and a snake coiled around it (him) to fool their pursuers. His relatives pass them, but his mother knows they are in that shape, and goes after them. However, she fells down another tree, instead of her son's new form, while the couple returns home and remarries.

==== Kurukafa ====
In a Turkish tale collected from an 85-year-old source named Selvinaz Yücel, from Kumdanlı, Yalvaç, with the title Kurakafa, an old woman is foraging for firewood when a skull rolls towards her and asks to be brought with her. The skull then asks her to court the padishah's daughter, and the story explains there is a handsome youth inside the skull shape. The old woman goes to talk to the padishah about the skull son's interest in the princess, and the padishah orders the construction of a palace on the threshing floor. The skull is told of the padishah's request, touches his own ring and creates the palace for him. The skull marries the princess, reveals his true nature to her, and asks her not to tell anyone about it. The following morning, the people join for a cirit competition and javelin throwing. The princess is endlessly mocked by the guests and reveals the knight in green clothes is her husband, the skull. The skull husband, in human form, stops the horse in his tracks, admonishes the princess for telling the secret, and says that even if she wears down iron sandals and an iron cane she will never find him, and departs. The princess tells her father her husband has vanished, dons the iron apparel and goes in search of him. She finds a dog by a spring and asks it about the skull, and the dog says he is at Bahtiyar. The princess reaches Bahtiyar and finds her skull husband at his dev-mother's house. The skull husband warns the princess his mother will devour her, but she insists to remain with him. He tries to hide the princess from his mother, but she senses a human smell, so he has to introduce the human to her. The dev-mother tries to kill and devour the princess, but she prevails with her husband's help. First, the dev-mother orders the princess to fill forty jars with her tears - the skull husband advises the princess to mix water and salt; next, to sweep and not sweep the house - the skull husband advises his wife to sweep the floor and place the broom on the dust; thirdly, to fetch and not fetch bird feathers - the skull husband says a prayer and summons the birds for them to molt their feathers for her. The dev-mother suspects that her son, the skull, has had a hand in helping the princess, and finally sends the princess to her dev-sister to eat some cheese ("peynir yemeye") — a trap, but the human skull advises his wife how to proceed: the cheese is toxic, so she will tell his dev-aunt about eating it with her husband; then, to reach his aunt's house, she will see a man whose eyes she is to clean, drink some water from a fountain; exchange the fodder between two animals (meat for a dog, grass for a sheep), place a stone in front of a door, sweep the stairs and meet his aunt, who will invite the princess in to eat some bread, which she is to decline. The princess follows her husband's instructions to the letter and rushes back as the dev-aunt commands her servants to stop her, to no avail. Finally, the dev-mother marries her son to her niece. Suddenly, the weather becomes cold, and the skull husband lights ten candles on his cousin's fingers, which burn her to death. He then takes his wife and escapes through the chimney from his dev-family. The following morning, the dev-relatives find the bride burnt to ashes and chase after the fleeing couple. On the road, the human skull and the princess shapeshift into a melon orchard (the princess) and a garden-keeper (the human skull), into a juniper tree (him) and a snake under the tree (her), and into a stream (him) and a sandy margin (her). The dev-mother goes to chase them herself, but she cannot find them. The human skull and the princess return home and elude their pursuers.

=== Other tales ===
==== Bahtiyar Ağa ====
In a Turkish tale collected from an informant in Kahramanmaraş with the title Bahtiyar Ağa, Bahtiyar Ağa wants to marry a girl, and asks her to walk with a pair of iron sandals and an iron cane until she finds him, then vanishes. The girl goes after him in the iron garments, and, after walking a long way, notices the iron sandals and the iron cane are worn out, and goes to rest next to a fountain. Back to Bahtiyar Ağa, he sends his maidservants to fetch water for the ablutions. The maidservants leave the house and go to the fountain. The girl wakes up and sees the girls fetching water, then asks each one for a drink, each maidservant carrying a jug (golden, silver, copper, wooden, and clay). Four of the maidservants refuse her request, for they are fetching water for Bahtiyar Ağa, save for the one carrying the clay one, which gives some water for the stranger to drink. The girl drops a ring inside the jug, which the maidservant brings to Bahtiyar Ağa. The man recognizes the ring, and goes to meet the girl outside, turning her into an apple and taking her inside his house. Bahtiyar Ağa's mother, however, smells a human scent and asks her son about it. He makes her take a vow not to devour the girl, and introduces the human girl to his man-eating mother. Later, the creature orders the girl to gather bird feathers to fill a mattress for Bahtiyar Ağa, on penalty of devouring her if she fails. The girl tells Bahtiyar Ağa about it, and he advises her to go up a mountain and shout that she is making a mattress for Bahtiyar Ağa, and the birds will come to give her their feathers. It happens thus, and the girl accomplishes the task. Next, his mother gives the girl a golden broom and her to sweep and not lose a single thread of the broom. Bahtiyar Ağa summons a gust of wind and rain to sweep the house for her. Thirdly, the girl is to fill two jugs with her tears, which she does by sprinkling water and some salt.

Still undefeated, for she tells the girl her son Bahtiyar Ağa is behind her successes, she orders the girl to get a sieve from her daughter's house - a trap, since the other creature has not made the same vow. Bahtiyar Ağa intercepts the girl and advises her how to proceed: smell a flower in a spring, drink water from a spring of pus, close an open door and open a close one, exchange the fodder between two animals (grass for a horse, meat for a dog), steal the sieve and rush back. The girl follows the instructions to the letter, grabs the sieve and runs back to the house, the creature's voice commanding the animals, the doors and the fountains to stop her, to no avail. Finally, Bahtiyar Ağa decides to escape from his mother's house, and takes the girl with him. On the road, they realize they are being chased by a cloud (which is his sister at first, then his mother), and transform into objects to fool her: a fountain (him) and a stone (her), and a snake (him) and a poplar tree (her). His mother approaches the couple and confronts her son, changed into a snake. Bahtiyar Ağa, in snake form, admits defeat and asks for a last kiss from his mother. As soon as she opens her mouth, he bites her with snake venom, killing her.

==== Brave Yusuf ====
In a Turkish tale titled Yiğit Yusuf ("Brave Yusuf"), collected in Gemerek, Sivas, from informant Bedir Demirci by author M. Güner Demiray, in a village lives a poor couple named Uncle Veli and Mother Elif, with Veli herding the village cattle. They are also childless and Elif wants a child. One day, Veli asks Elif to find a pumpkin in their garden for some stew. Elif goes to cut a pumpkin in their garden while Veli is away, but the pumpkin begins to talk and begs three times not to be cut. Elif questions whether there is a boy or a girl inside the gourd, returns home and cooks pilaf to Veli, opting to hide the fact. Veli insists to have the pumpkin stew and threatens to beat Elif, who retorts he should cut the vegetable himself. Veli goes to cut and the pumpkin begs him not to cut it, for it will be their son. Veli is astonished, returns home and Elif mocks him about it, then Veli decides they should keep the pumpkin in the pantry. Three months pass; in one evening, Elif asks Veli about their lack of a son, and suddenly the pumpkin rolls out to them, offering to be their son. The gourd them asks Elif to go court the sultan's daughter in the morning.

The following day, Elif goes to the palace. The sultan notices her and orders his guards to bring her in. She is sat on the suitor's stone and the queen discerns she is there to ask for the hand of the youngest princess. The sultan is offended, orders his guards to beat her, and expel her. Elif is hurt and sore all over and falls on the bed. After three months, her wounds are healed, and the pumpkin asks her to go again. Elif goes again to talk to the sultan, who refuses her yet again and expels her by beating. Failing twice, the pumpkin as his father to go and court the princess, this time by saying his son is dying. Veli follows the pumpkin son's instructions and the sultan softens a bit, but still demands some gifts first: a palace like his, a horse like his, a hound like his, herds like his, and forty camel loads of gold - by morning. Veli returns home and informs the pumpkin, who tells him to go to the garden and utter "Golden Coral" three times, then say that his brother Yusuf wants what the sultan requested, and three eggs will emerge from the gourd vine, which he is to place in front of the sultan's horse, his hound and his palace. Veli does as instructed and goes to sleep.

The following morning, everything the sultan requested is there before their eyes. The pumpkin son is glad, and comes out of the gourd husk in his true form, a handsome young man. He asks his parents to keep the secret, lest everything falls apart, then returns to the husk. Veli and Elif mingle with the court and the sultan, who wishes to see his future son-in-law. Veli and Elif bring the pumpkin on a tray, he turns into a youth with radiance and goes to meet the sultan. The monarch is impressed with such a suitor and agrees to marry him to his cadette Zeynep (or Zeyneb). Zeynep goes to meet her suitor and they bond. Yusuf confides in the princess that he transforms into a gourd by entering the husk, which is his talisman that must not be burned. Yusuf asks her to keep his secret, but Zeynep admits that she might blurt it out to one of her sisters. Still, Yusuf tells her they must not burn it, lest she never finds him again. He then gives her his ring and enters the gourd, and is carried back home. The gourd tells his father he senses something will befall him soon.

The following morning, Zeynep's elder sister is having her wedding celebration. Yusuf is invited to the cirit games by burning a feather that magically originates a horse and a sword, while his gourd husk his hidden in Zeynep's room. The palace gets news that her bridegroom lives in a gourd, to the fury of the sultan and the princesses. The elder princess berates Zeynep for marrying a gourd and disgracing them; Zeynep retorts that she loves the man inside. The elder princess enters her sister's room, searches up and down and finds the pumpkin husk, then throws it in the hearth to burn it, questioning why would anyone marry a pumpkin. Dense smoke fills up the air and reaches the sky. At the games, Yusuf senses the smell of the burning and realizes it is his pumpkin husk. He rushes to his palace and sees the husk on fire, then tells Zeynep he will love her forever, and rides his horse away to the Land of the Devs.

After his disappearance, Zeynep mourns for him, until she is skin and bones. The padishah tries to comfort her by saying he can find her beys and sultans as bridegrooms, and asks her not to grieve for a gourd. Her mother also tries to plead with her, to no avail. Finally, she vows she would pierce mountains for Yusuf and decides to go after him, so she dons an iron staff and iron sandals, and departs, while her parents-in-law mourn for their lost son. Zeynep wanders far and wide, through streams and hills, wearing down the iron apparel. She meets a wise old man on the road, in whom she confides the reason for her quest. The old man gives her a sack of food, and new iron apparel, then urges her to press on.

She reaches a copper cliff, where she finds a servant girl carrying a copper tray to fill with water. She asks if they saw her husband Yusuf there, but they say it has been a hundred years since he was there. Zeynep soldiers on and passes by a silver cliff, where a servant is carrying a silver water jug, and asks about her husband's location. She then wanders a bit more and arrives at a golden rock, where she sees a maidservant fetching water in a golden jug. She asks the servant about Yusuf's location, and learns that the maidservant and Yusuf work there, in the Land of the Devs, and the water is for Yusuf. Zeynep asks to drink the water, but secretly drops her ring inside it. The maidservant brings the golden jug to Yusuf, who goes to wash his hands and finds the ring. He recognizes it, and asks the maidservant, Cemile, if the girl saw someone. Cemile mentions the stranger by the fountain. Yusuf dismisses the servant and goes to meet Zeynep by the fountain. They reunite, and Yusuf explains that he and Cemile are slaves to the Devs, then introduces Zeynep as another servant to them to avoid suspicions.

Soon, the princess is forced on hard tasks for Devs. The matriarch, a Seven-Headead female, wakes up and orders the princess to go to her sister's house and fetch "Damdamınan Dımdım". Yusuf intercepts his wife and warns this is a trap for her to be devoured, and advises her how to proceed: she will to pass by two springs, one with blood and the other with pus, she will drink three handfuls from the pool of blood and wash her face with three handfuls of pus; she is to exchange the fodder between two animals (meat for a dog, grass for a horse), open four gates that are closed and close four gates that are open, and enter the eighth gate; enter the house, take a box ("kutu", in the original) from the window and flee, since the lives of the devs are inside the box. Zeynep follows her husband's instructions to the letter, steals the box and rushes back. The Seven-Headed Ogress's sister commands her servants to stop the princess, since she is getting away with their lives, but they stay their hand due to the princess's kind actions. Zeynep returns with the box, and the Dev-woman suspects Yusuf taught her this.

Next, the Dev-woman says she is going to visit her sister, and orders the princess to stay suspended in the void, neither on earth nor in the sky. After she leaves, Yusuf warns that the ogress and her sister will come to devours her body and her head, takes a rope and builds a swing for her. The pair of ogresses return and find Zeynep swinging on the swing. The dev-woman is surprised that the task is done and suspects Yusuf taught this. Thirdly, the dev-woman brings a large jar for the princess to fill with her tears. Zeynep cries and tries to fill the jar, but her tears dry up and she cries blood. Yusuf goes to aid his wife by bringing forty mules with salt and forty camels with water, mixes salt with water and fills up the jar, while she bends over the jar to pretend she fulfilled the task. The dev-woman returns, sees that the task has been fulfilled, but suspects Yusuf had a hand in this, then beats both Yusuf and Zeynep. Due to the beating, the couple become bedridden for months, and their life in the land of devs becomes unbearable. Finally, one night, Yusuf tells his wife they must escape, since the devs will devour them and Cemile. Thus, the couple and Cemile seize the opportunity when the devs sleep for seven days, and return to Zeynep's realm. Yusuf takes his father-in-law's riches and shares it with the poor, elevate his parents from poverty, marries Zeynep and weds Cemile to another noble.

=== Turkish Cyprus ===
==== The Green Angel ====
In a Turkish Cypriot tale titled Yeşil Melek ("Green Angel"), a king has a daughter. One day, suitors gather for her choice of suitor by throwing arrows at random. The princess shoots three arrows; she misses the first two times, but the third one hits a hill in the distance. The arrow lands near a horn ("boynuzdur", in the original). The princess retrials the shoot and the arrow still lands near the horn. The princess admits it is her fate, and her father builds a house near the horn. Fortunately for the princess, a youth comes out of the horn. He tells the princess to keep quiet about him for forty days, and they can be together. After a while, there is some horse contest, and the princess is mocked for marrying the horn, but, fed up with the teasing and mockery, she tells them about the boy that comes out of the horn. The princess returns home and does not find the youth, so decides to search for him. She begins a journey and reaches the Golden Mountain in hopes of finding clues of his whereabouts. A maidservant with a golden jug tells the princess Green Angel is not there, so she continues on her journey to the Onluk mountain and finally the Ruby Mountain. The princess stops by a stream and asks for some water from a maidservant, who tells her she is bringing water to Green Angel. The princess drinks from the ruby jug and drops her ring inside it, which the maidservant brings to her master. Green Angel discovers the ring and goes to meet her outside, by the stream. Green Angel warns the princess his family (father, mother, sisters) are devs (giants), and he is set to marry his female cousin. Despite the danger, the princess wishes to be with him, so he turns her into a pin and brings it home with him.

When he enters the house, his dev mother starts to scent a human's presence, which Green Angel tries to dismiss. Eventually, Green Angel makes his mother swear an oath and transforms the princess from pin to human form. After some days, the dev mother begins to force tasks on the princess: first, to sweep and not sweep the house - Green Angel takes the broom, sweeps the room and sprinkles some dust around the room. Next, the creature orders the girl to fill vases with her tears - Green Angel uses a sieve. The creature suspects the princess is being helped by her son. The third time, knowing that she cannot renege on her vow, she sends the princess to a certain place and orders her to fetch a box of musicians from the dev mother's brother for her son's wedding. Before the princess goes, Green Angel intercepts her and advises her how to proceed: drink from a stream, exchange the fodder between two animals (straw for a donkey, bones for a dog), pass a bridge and suckle on his aunt's breasts, then ask for the box. The princess does as instructed and steals the box, as the dev aunt commands the animals and the river to stop her, to no avail. At a distance, the princess opens up the box and musicians fly out of it. The princess begins to cry; Green Angel appears and helps her lock everything back into the box by burning one of his hairs. Finally, at Green Angel's wedding to his female cousin, his dev mother lights up candles on the princess's fingers and forces her to illuminate the wedding couple. Green Angel takes some provisions for the road, then trades the candles on the princess's finger for his bride, and both escape. The next morning, the dev family discovers the couple have escaped, and the bride burnt to death, then chase after Green Angel and the princess. On the road, the couple throw objects behind them to deter their pursuers: an object creates a forest, the soap creats another obstacle, and the comb creates a wall. Failing that, the dev family is still in relentless pursuit, and Green Angel decides to transform himself and the princess into other people: first, a gardener and a garden, and finally into dates (the princess) and a seven-headed snake (Green Angel) to trick his mother. Green Angel kills his mother, then resumes human shape and brings the princess to her father's land, where they celebrate their wedding.

== See also ==
- The Horse-Devil and the Witch
- The Padisah's Youngest Daughter and Her Donkey-Skull Husband
- The Princess Who Could Not Keep a Secret
- The Stone of Patience (Turkish folktale)
- The Tale of Aftab
