= The Stone of Patience (Turkish folktale) =

Turkish fairy tale

The Stone of Patience or The Patient Stone (Turkish: Sabırtaşı) is a Turkish fairy tale published by folklorist Eflatun Cem Güney. The story concerns a princess who marries a youth under an animal disguise, loses him due to her breaking his trust, and goes after him at his mother's home, where she is forced to perform hard tasks for her.

The tale belongs to the international cycle of the Animal as Bridegroom or The Search for the Lost Husband, wherein a human princess marries a supernatural husband, loses him, and goes on a quest to find him. It is also distantly related to the Graeco-Roman myth of Cupid and Psyche, in that the heroine is forced to perform difficult tasks for a witch or her mother-in-law.

== Publication ==
The tale was originally published by folklorist Eflatun Cem Güney in 1947, with new editions in 1950, 1951 and 1954. It was later translated into Russian language as "Камень терпенья" ("The Stone of Patience").

== Summary ==
In this tale, a "blood well" is located between two kingdoms, and war eventually breaks out when the well is full. A padishah is worried that, with the deaths of many young men, he might not be able to secure husbands for his three daughters: Snow-white Rose (or Silver Girl), Crimson Rose and Golden Rose. One day, the girls stroll in the garden, and lament over the fact that, despite their beauty and grace, something is still missing. The gardener overhears them and advises the following: each is to pluck a similarly coloured rose from a rosebush (representing each daughter), place it on a platter with a pomegranate, and send a slave dressed in similar clothes with the platter to a person named Karadayı ("Черный дядька", in the Russian translation; a "Black Old Man"). The "Black Old Man" divines the girls' intention and explains to the padishah they want to be married.

The padishah decides to set a test: shoot three silver arrows at random at three different directions; whatever they land, there they shall find their husbands. The youngest's arrow lands in a mountain named Kafadagi, just before the realm of the divs. The padishah's wife gives her daughter a stone of patience and sends her on her way. The princess finds her silver arrow in the middle of nowhere, and weeps for her sad fate, but the stone of patience tells her to wait and have patience. Trusting the stone's advice, she finds a hidden trapdoor, with a fireplace inside. She makes herself at home, and goes to find food. She fails, but sees a partridge ("keklik", in the original; "золотой фазан", 'golden pheasant', in the Russian translation) with some herbs in its mouth. She thinks about hunting the bird, but lets it be. The next day, the patridge takes off its wings and becomes a human knight. He introduces himself as Kocabey (Kojabey in the Russian translation), and wants to befriend the princess. He summons a crystal palace, which the princess believes to be a mirage, a magic trick at first, but trusts Kocabey and enters. After they sit in a room, the princess tells her story to Kocabey, and the man reveals he comes from a land famous for its jigits, he comes from a family of wizards, and he changes forms from day to day. They fall into a routine: Kocabey is an animal by day in the vastness of the desert, and at night becomes a man and spends time with the princess in the magical palace. After a few years and 40 days, a messenger named Keloglan visits the princess bearing good news: her sisters have given birth to her nephew and niece, and her father is holding a festival to celebrate the occasion. The princess and Kocabey agree to go to the festival.

Kocabey turns into a pigeon and is carried by the princess to her kingdom. The princess goes to meet her sisters, who mock her raggedy clothes. The princess tries to save face and lies to them that her husband is a merchant. The princess then spends the night in the stables with the pigeon-shaped Kocabey, who tells her that he will take part in the equestrian competition to teach her sisters a lesson: in the first day, he comes as white rider on a white horse; in the second, as a golden knight; and on the third, as a blue knight. During the three days competition, the mysterious jigit defeats the others, to the crowd's amazement. Although she promised Kocabey to keep his secret, the princess, fed up with her sisters' mockery, reveals the knight in blue is her husband. Suddenly, a bloodied dove perches near her, berates her action, and tells her to find him wearing seven iron shoes and an iron cane. She travels high and low for Kocabey, and stops to rest by a fig tree. The ground opens and two dwarven appear, one black-haired and the other white-haired, and comment about Kocabey's illness, and the only cure: water from the Fountain of the Silent Ones. The princess finds the fountain, says a prayer and takes the water with her.

She reaches Kocabey's country and cures him with the water. After curing him, she is treated as a guest of honour in his house, but his mother, who is described as a woman with two ram horns on her head, listens to a secret conversation between the girl and Kocabey, and learns she was responsible for her son's suffering. Kocabey's mother then forces the princess on tasks for her son's upcoming wedding to his cousin: first, she is to build a mill in the Beshkkaya rock. The princess tells Kocabey about the task, and he advises her how to proceed: walk towards the mountain, pay no attention to the packs of wolves and dogs that will appears in front of her, reach the Beşikkaya rock and sing some verses for the mountain to fulfill the task. It happens thus and Beşikkaya creates the mill for her. Kocabey's mother suspects this was her son's doing and assigns another task: to sweep the rooms, fill mattresses with feathers, and pots with honey and oil - Kocabey tells her to go up the mountain and call to the winds to come sweep and rain on the house, then to go to the garden and summon the birds in Kocabey's name for them to give feathers from their wings, and open the door and command the pots and jars to fill themselves in the marketplace and return home.

Thirdly, his mother orders her to go to a tellibey, her nephew, who lives in a mountain near Karadag, and get from him a 40-string saz. Kocabey instructs the princess: she is to compliment two rivers (Mysmyl and Mundar) filled with poisonous water; walk in thorns and pretend they are rose petals; compliment an owl by saying it is a nightingale, talk to his cousin and wait until she gets the saz. She follows the instructions and retrieves the instrument. During the wedding ceremony, the princess pours out her woes to the stone of patience, which bursts apart from her anguish. Kocabey enters her room and decides to escape with her. He shapeshifts into an eagle and takes the princess on his wings.

As they fly through the air, they are pursued by his relatives. To elude their pursuers, they shapeshift into a spring (the princess) and a golden ladle (Kocabey); then into a rose garden (the princess) and a garden-keeper (Kocabey); and finally into a rosebud (the princess) and a yellow snake coiled around it (Kocabey). His mother tries to persuade him to come back with her, but Kocabey, still in snake form, confesses that he taught his wife the secrets of the peris and the patience of the divs; she taught him to cry and laugh like a human being; that by "adding a human soul" into their lineage, they can become humans, and that he prefers that fate instead of living like a semi-human. His mother takes it all in, gives her blessing to their union, and asks Kocabey to be henceforth named Sabur-Khan ("King of Patience"), and his wife Sabur-Khatun ("Queen of Patience"). They return to the land of the devs and fairies, Kocabey marries the princess and they have twin children, a boy and a girl.

== Analysis ==
=== Tale type ===
This tale was classified by Hungarian ethnographer Ákos Dömötör as Turkish type EB 98.

In his monograph about Cupid and Psyche, Jan-Öjvind Swahn acknowledged that Turkish type 98 was subtype 425A of his analysis, that is, "Cupid and Psyche", being the "oldest" and containing the episode of the witch's tasks. In the international index, however, Swahn's typing is indexed as type ATU 425B, "The Son of the Witch".

In an article in Enzyklopädie des Märchens, folklorist Christine Goldberg noted that the first part of type ATU 432, "The Prince as Bird" (heroine's meeting with the bird prince and his later injuries), may continue with the heroine's search for him and combine with tale type ATU 425A, "The Animal (Monster) as Bridegroom", or with tale type ATU 425B, "The Disenchanted Husband: The Witch's Tasks".

=== Motifs ===
The titular sabirtasi ("patient stone") appears in other tales wherein the heroine holds a vigil for forty days next to a dead man that is to become her husband.

==== The supernatural husband ====
In most of the variants collected, the supernatural husband is a horse, followed by a man with a donkey's head and a camel. In other tales, he may be a snake, a frog, or even Turkish hero Kaloghlan. In some tales, the heroine chooses her future supernatural husband by throwing an object, like a dart, an arrow or a handkerchief.

==== The heroine's tasks ====
Another motif that appears in the tale type is that the heroine must travel to another witch's house and fetch from there a box or casket she must not open. German folklorist Hans-Jörg Uther remarked that these motives ("the quest for the casket" and the visit to the second witch) are "the essential feature" of the subtype.

==== The heroes' Magic Flight ====
According to Christine Goldberg, some variants of the type show as a closing episode "The Magic Flight" sequence, a combination that appears "sporadically in Europe", but "traditionally in Turkey". As their final transformation to deceive the ogress mother, the princess becomes a tree and her supernatural husband becomes a snake coiled around it. Although this episode is more characteristic of tale type ATU 313, "The Magic Flight", some variants of type ATU 425B also show it as a closing episode. German literary critic Walter Puchner argues that the motif attached itself to type 425B, as a Wandermotiv ("Wandering motif").

== Variants ==
=== Şamı şamdan ===
In a Turkish tale from Sivas with the title Şamı şamdan, a merchant has three daughters. Before he goes on a journey, he asks which presents he can bring them: the elder asks for a pearl bracelet, the middle one for a diamond belt, but the youngest cannot yet decide. She leaves the house and meets a gypsy woman in whom she confides her troubles, and the woman advises her to ask for a candlestick. The man goes on his business trip and finds the belt and the bracelet, but cannot find the candlestick. On the journey home, the man is caught in a vortex of sand, when a bird appears to him and tells he will come to his house in a few days. The merchant returns home, gives his daughters their gifts and tells the youngest to wait for the candlestick. Two days later, a bird flies in through the window and turns into a handsome youth. The girl is afraid of his presence and calls for her parents. The youth turns into a bird, then back to human and introduces himself to the merchant and his wife. The parents agree to a marriage. The bird flies in at night and departs in the morning. Some time later, the girl meets the gypsy woman again, who asks about their arrangement: the bird man leaves a bag of gold each morning for her, while her elder sisters prepare her bed. Back to the elder sister, she discovers the bag of gold and confronts her parents about it, learning of the youngest's bird lover. Later, when the family is going to the public bath, the elder sister pretends to have forgotten something at home and closes the window in the youngest's room. The bird lover flies in, but crashes against the glass, hurts himself and flies away. The whole family returns home and the girl notices the blood in her bedroom, then asks her father to prepare iron shoes and an iron cane, for she will search for her lover.

The girl walks until the iron shoes are worn out. She hears some devs coming, and quickly climbs up a tree. The devs talk about the injured bird youth, whose name is Mihri, who is dying, and the only cure is killing the devs and burning them to ashes to use the ashes in his body. After the devs fall asleep, the girl kills the devs and burns their corpses to cinders, and goes to Mihri's house to cure him. She announces herself as a male doctor and requests a bathhouse for Mihri, to bathe him with the ashes. Her orders are carried out, and Mihri is cured. The girl removes her veil and reveals herself, but Mihri warns his wife his mother will devour her, so he turns her into an apple and hides her. His mother comes to his room, wanting to thank the doctor, but smells a human scent. Mihri makes his mother promise not to hurt him, and introduces his human wife to her.

Mihri is already betrothed to his aunt's daughter, so Mihri's dev-mother forces the merchant's daughter to perform tasks before the wedding: first, she orders the girl to sweep and not sweep the house, and wash and unwash the pot - Mihri tells her to wash the pot and place sand on it, and to sweep the house and spread dung around. Mihri's dev-mother suspects Mihri had a hand in helping the girl, and gives another task: to fetch a sack full of bird feathers - Mihri advises his wife to go to the mountain and shout that Mihri is dead, and the birds will shed their feathers for her. Thirdly, the dev-woman sends the girl to her sister in order to get a "saca" - a trap, since the dev-aunt will devour her. Mihri intercepts his wife, gives her a seal and advises her how to proceed: close an open door and shut an open one, delouse a woman's hair and eat the louse, drink from a fountain of pus and blood, and give a rag to his aunt, who is cleaning a tandoor with her breasts. The girl follows his instructions to the letter, and meets his aunt. While she goes to another room to sharpen her teeth, the girl leaves Mihri's seal on the table and rushes with the "saci" back home.

Finally, Mihri's dev-mother arranges for her son's marriage: the merchant's daughter is undressed and made to hold candles to light the ceremony. Mihri takes the candles from his human wife and places them on his cousin's hands, then escapes with her. After the false bride burns, one of his dev-aunts goes after Mihri and the girl, who turn into a bathhouse and bathhouse keeper to trick her. Next, another dev-aunt cahses after the couple, and they turn into a hoe (her) and a gardenkeeper (him). Lastly, his own dev-mother goes after the couple, and they shapeshift into a tree (her) and a snake (him). The dev-mother reaches the pair and recognizes them, but they flee back home and live happily. Eberhard and Boratav classified the tale as type ATU 432, "The Prince as Bird", but its ending sequence follows type ATU 425B, "The Son of the Witch" (or TTV 98).

=== Iron Staff, Iron Sandals ===
In a Turkish tale titled Demir Asa, Demir Çarık ("Iron Staff, Iron Sandals"), from Taşeli, a padishah's three daughters throw arrows at random to choose suitors, for wherever the arrow lands on they shall find their suitors. The elder two marry human partners, while the youngest's arrow lands on an eagle's nest. Resigning to her fate, she marries the fowl husband ("gaz tavığını", in the original; "kaz tavuğu"). To her surprise, however, the fowl husband turns into a brave youth by taking off his birdskin, but he tells his wife not to tell a soul about it. The princess's elder sisters mock her for marrying the fowl, but he warns her to keep quiet, lest she has to search for him in iron sandals and walking with an iron cane until they are worn out. Some time later, fed up with their mockery, she reveals her husband is indeed human. She goes to meet her husband, but cannot find him, so she commissions the iron apparel and goes after him. After some wandering, she reaches a fountain where a servant girl is fetching water. Reminded of the girl her husband Bahdiyar gave her before he vanishes, the princess asks the servant for some water to drink and drops the ring inside the jug. Inside the house, the servant pours down water on Bahdiyar and he notices the ring, and the servant tells him about the stranger by the fountain outside and he asks her to bring them in. Bahdiyar explains his elder sister is a dev (giantess), and he has been betrothed to his cousin, his mother's niece by his mother, a dev-woman. Bahdiyar turns his human wife into a broom to hide her from his dev family, but they still sense a human scent nearby. After some days, Bahdiyar asks his family he found a girl as a new servant and makes them promise not to harm her, then turns back the princess into human form. First, the dev-woman orders the princess to sweep. Not knowing how to do it, Bahdiyar fulfills the task for her by sweeping the floor and blowing some dust. Next, since they are arranging Bahdiyar's upcoming marriage, Bahdiyar summons the birds for them to offer them their feathers, which are used for pillows. Later, Bahdiyar is married to his cousin, and tells his mother he will take the new servant girl to their chambers. Bahdiyar lights ten candles on his cousin's fingers, places two millstones on her, and escapes with the princess. The dev family goes to check on the bride and find her burning to death. Realizing Bahdiyar escaped, the dev family chase after them, but they shapeshift into other people to fool them: a garden house, a man with a ladle near a fountain and a thorn bush and "Erzail" ("Azrael"). The dev-mother approaches the bush, but the Erzail wraps himself around it. The princess and her husband reach her father's kingdom, where they remarry.

=== Yellow Feather ===
In a Turkish tale collected from an informant named Fadime Erkut in Tokat with the title Sarı Tüy ("Yellow Feather"), a man has three daughters and is ready to marry them off, but one of his daughters asks to consult with her female teacher first. The teacher tells the girl to ask her father to bring "Sarı Tüy" ("Yellow Feather"), which is in a box at the market and, after getting it, she is to let the box in another room and go to sleep. The man goes to the market and brings the box of Yellow Feather to his daughter, who places it in another room and goes to sleep. At night, the box opens by itself and out emerges a youth named Yellow Feather, who the informant describes as the son of a fairy, who goes to sleep with the girl. Some night later, the girl discovers Yellow Feather, who asks her not to reveal his identity to her sisters. One day, Yellow Feather is on the girls' roof on a yellow horse and in yellow garments, and the girl keeps quiet about his identity. This repeats the following day. On the third day, the girl points to the knight on the roof and says he is her husband, Yellow Feather. Betrayed by his human companion, Yellow Feather admonishes her and says she will only find him again if she wears down a pair of iron sandals and walk with an iron cane, then vanishes.

The girl dons the iron apparel and goes after him. After much wandering, she stops by a fountain to rest and notices her shoes are worn out, and the iron cane is but a stick in her hand. Next to the fountain, there are three houses: one of silver, another of gold and the third of mother-of-pearl. The human girl sees a girl come with from the silver house to fetch water and asks her if she saw Yellow Feather. The girl from the silver house says that Yellow Feather is her brother, and returns home to inform. The next day, the girl sees another one exiting the golden house to draw water and asks her if she saw Yellow Feather; the girl from the golden house says that Yellow Feather is her aunt's son. The third day, a third girl comes from the house of mother-of-pearl to fetch water, and the human girl asks if she saw Yellow Feather. The girl from the house of mother-of-pearl knows Yellow Feather, for he is her bridegroom, and becomes jealous. Yellow Feather's mother comes to take the newcomer in and hires her as her son's bride's maidservant. Thus, Yellow Feather's mother says she is leaving to pay a visit to another house and orders the human girl to sweep and not sweep the floor. The girl does not know what to do and weeps. Yellow Feather appears and advises her: sweep half of the house and not the other half, and she leaves the garden untouched. Yellow Feather's mother returns and suspects her son had a hand in this.

Next, his mother orders the girl to wash the dishes as if she is not washing them, and not wash them as if she is washing them. The girl cries over the impossibility of the task, when Yellow Feather advises her to wash part of it. Still, the woman suspects her son's interference. Thirdly, she asks the girl not to stay neither on the ground, nor in the sky - Yellow Feather places his human wife on a swing to fulfill the task. Fourthly, the women orders the girl to fetch a box from her sister's house, which is behind a door, but the stairs are ordered to kill her. Yellow Feather advises his human wife to raise the plain stairs and lower the elevated one, fetch the box, and come back. Despite her attempts, his mother cannot kill the girl, so she brings the bride from the house of mother-of-pearl and weds her to Yellow Feather, makes them enter the wedding chambers, and places ten lit candles on the newcomer's hands for her to hold up. Yellow Feather notices his human wife's hands are burning, kills his bride, puts out the candles and escapes with his true wife to the wilderness. The next day, his family goes after him, and he shapeshifts himself and his wife into objects to trick their pursuers: first, into a mill (her) and a miller (him) to deceive his father; then, into a fountain basin (her) and a fountain (him) to fool his own sister. Finally, Yellow Feather's mother comes after the couple, and they shapeshift into a poplar tree (his human wife) and a snake coiled tighly around the tree (him) to protect it. Yellow Feather's mother reaches the couple and wants to cut up a shard of the tree, but the snake protects it with its body, so she leaves them be. Yellow Feather and his human wife resume their human forms and return home.

=== Green Grass ===
In a Turkish tale collected by professor Necati Demir from an informant from Avren, in Sivas, with the title YEŞİL OT ("Green Grass"), a father has three daughters and one day goes to the city. His daughters ask for returning gifts: the elder for a dress, the middle one for grapes, sugar and chickpeas, and the youngest asks for Green Grass, and curses him so that if he forgets about it, smoke and dust shall cloud his path. He goes to the city and buys the dress and provisions for the elder two, but forgets about Green Grass, and smoke and dust cloud his path. He remembers his cadette's request, enters a shop and buys a box of Green Grass. He returns home and gives the gifts to his daughters. The youngest takes the box to her room and opens it: out comes a handsome youth on a horse. They fall in love with each other, and the youth says he will attend a competition, asking the girl not to reveal anything. It happens thus, and the youth amazes the guests. He returns home and asks the girl to keep the secret for three more days. He attends a second wedding in green clothes and on a green horse, and amazes the guests. He returns home and says he will attend a third wedding, so there is just a day for the girl to keep his secret. He amazes the guests at javelin throwing, and the girl tells her sisters the knight is her fiancé. The youth disappears, and the girl mourns for him.

Later, she dons iron boots and walks with an iron staff for hills and valleys for six months. She finally reaches a fountain where a maid is drawing water in a jug. The maid says she cannot offer anything, since it is her brother's, Green Grass, wedding. The girl realizes she has found her fiancé, and drops her ring in the jug. Green Grass scolds his sister for her delay, and finds his human fiancée's ring in the water. He realizes his fiancée is there and dismisses his sister. Green Grass goes to the fountain and reunites with his human fiancée, but admonishes her that she arrived at the house of his dev family. He then turns her into a broom and hides her in his mother's house, as the family prepares his wedding. His dev-mother arrives and senses a human smell; she searches the whole house and tries to burn the broom, but Green Grass turns it into a stick to hide his fiancée. Despite this, the dev-mother can still sense a human smell, so Green Grass restores his fiancée to human form and introduces her to his mother. The girl says she loves her son, but his mother forbids their relationship, since they are Devs, and she will eat her. Green Grass issues an ultimatum to protect his fiancée: she must not be hurt, otherwise he will not marry his mother's niece. The dev-mother begins to hound the newcomer, and forces her to fill a bucket with her tears. The girl tries to cry over the bucket, but cannot fill it with enough tears. Green Grass appears, takes out two jars with water, and sprinkles salt. The dev-mother tastes the mixture and says that this does not taste like her tears, but salty water. Next, the dev-mother orders her to fill a pillow and a bed. The girl climbs the mountain and shouts for the birds to come, since Green Grass needs their feathers. The task is fulfilled, but Green Grass's mother still dislikes her.

One day, the girl asks Green Grass how she can earn his mother's approval, and he advises her to suckle her large breasts while she is making halva, and compliment her milk. It happens thus, but the dev-woman questions the girl's doing. At another occasion, she orders the girl to fetch a rolling pin and a wooden tray from somewhere else, since they will bake bread for her son's wedding. Green Grass intercepts his human fiancée and advises her how to proceed: reach two fountains, one of blood and another of pus, drink from them and compliment them; exchange the fodder between two animals (grass for a horse, meat for a dog), open a closed door and shut an open one, steal the rolling pin and tray and rush back. The girl does as instructed, reaches another dev's house and runs back with the objects, as the dev orders his servants to stop her, to no avail, since the objects and animals were won over by the girl's actions. The dev-mother still complains that Green Grass advises the human girl. Finally, the human girl tells Green Grass she wants to be married, but he says they cannot do so in their house, since they may eat her. Green Grass marries the human fiancée, but transforms her into a broom and places her behind the door to the wedding chambers. The dev-bride confronts Green Grass about his marriage and wants him to make a choice: he chooses the human girl and flees with her as they were called for the prayers. On the road, Green Grass and the girl are being chased by his dev-family, and they shapeshift into objects to fool them: first, into a garden (her) and a garden-keeper (him) to trick his aunt, then into a tree (her), while he leans against the trunk to trick his other aunt; lastly, into a mosque (her) and an imam (him) to trick his mother. His mother asks the imam if he saw a couple there, and, on getting a negative response, runs back defeated. Green Grass and the girl return home.

== See also ==
- The Horse-Devil and the Witch
- The Padisah's Youngest Daughter and Her Donkey-Skull Husband
- The Tale of Aftab
- The Blue Bird (fairy tale)
- The Spotted Deer
- The Princess Who Could Not Keep a Secret
