= Habrmani =

Armenian folktale

Habrmani, Habermani or Habermany, the Serpent-Prince (Armenian: Հաբրմանի "Hăbĕrmāni") is an Armenian folktale about a serpent prince that marries a human maiden. The tale has been compared to the international cycle of the Animal as Bridegroom or The Search for the Lost Husband, wherein a human heroine marries a husband of supernatural origin, loses him and has to seek him out.

== Summary ==
=== First version: The Tale of Habrmani ===
In the tale titled ՀԱԲՐՄԱՆԻ ՀԵՔԻԱԹԸ or Сказка о Хабрмане ("The Tale of Habrmani"), published by Armenian literary critic Hakob S. Khachatryan, an old man brings a giant egg home. When his wife prepares the tondir oven, she sees a giant snake instead of the egg. She summons her husband, who comes to deal with the snake, but the animal has turned into a normal human. The youth requests his father to ask for the hand of princess in marriage. The king tells the poor man that he shall build an even bigger mansion for him, to make the four seasons appear on all four corners of a mountain, and to roll a giant carpet from the palace to the church. The man accomplishes the tasks with the help of a magic spell taught by his son, Habrmay/Habrman.

Habrman and the princess are set to be married, but the king summons his two other sons-in-law. Habrman tells his betrothed that her sisters will argue over him during the ceremony, but she must not reveal that the handsome newcomer is her beloved. For two days, her sisters have been arguing, but on the third day, the princess reveals the man is Habrman. The man stops by his bride and tells she must follow him through the City of Copper, the City of Silver and the City of Gold, where she may find him, by walking there with iron shoes and a steel cane, and vanishes. She walks during an indeterminate amount of time, and reaches a fountain near the City of Copper. She asks directions to the next two stops of her journey. When she reaches the City of Gold, she sees that 40 maidservants are getting water for their master, Habrman. The princess drops her ring in a jug. Habrman discovers his wife is there and brings her home. His father also notices her presence.

The princess is warned by her husband that his father may ask her to scratch his legs. Next, his mother invites the princess to her house, but Habrman advises her on how to proceed: when she arrives at her house, she will see a woman trying to bake bread on the tondir oven; the princess is to show her the correct way to do it. She follows the instructions to the letter and when his mother orders the woman to get the princess, she refuses. At last, Habrman and his wife escape from his parents in a Magic Flight sequence: first, she becomes a fountain and he a water seller; next, she becomes a temple and he a preacher; thirdly, she changes into an apple tree and he into a snake coiling around it. His father pursues the couple in all three attempts, but fails to do them any harm. When he sees the third transformation, Habrman's father hesitates and asks his son to show a part of him. Habrman spits venom into his father's mouth. After the escape, the couple arrive at the princess's kingdom, safe at last. The Russian language compilation sourced this tale as coming from a village teller from Ararat, but a later publication by the Armenian SSR Academy of Sciences located its source in Manazkert, collected in 1912 from one Nikoghayos Pevorusysun, then fifty years old and born in Ghaznafar village.

=== Second version: Habrmani ===
In a version from Shirak Province with the title "ՀԱԲՐՄԱՆԻ" (Russian: "Габрмани", English: "Habrmani"), translated as Habermani by Charles Downing, a snake follows a poor seller home and becomes his son. One day, he asks the man to go to the king's palace and ask for the princess's hand in marriage. The king scoffs at the poor man's proposal and demands he first builds a palace to rival his own. The poor man asks the serpent son what he can do, and the serpent son tells him to go to a snake burrow and, in Habrman's name, ask a "Big Lady" and a "Little Lady" he needs a palace to be built. Next, his task is to build a large fountain to accommodate thousands of birds, to roll out a large carpet from his palace to the king's, and to produce invisible musicians to play music at the ceremony.

After he fulfills the tasks, the serpent son marries the human princess and reveals he is a human prince underneath the snakeskin, warning his wife that she must not reveal his secret. He wants to compete in a tournament riding a blue horse the next day and the princess must not say that he is the rider. During the next days, the princess is mocked for marrying a snake, but she tells them the rider is her husband. The now human prince disappears, and the princess must seek him wearing iron shoes and carrying a steel cane. Meanwhile, Habrman, in his wanderings, has reached the Golden City, where a witch has welcomed him and sets him to be married to her daughter. The princess reaches a fortress of clay, a fortress of glass, a fortress of iron, a fortress of copper, of silver and finally of gold, asking around about her husband's whereabouts. She locates her husband Habrman in the fortress of gold, as a servant is coming to fetch water for him. She asks for a drink of the jug and drops her ring inside the jug. Habrman discovers his wife is there and brings her in.

The owner of the fortress, an old woman, orders the princess to massage her feet, which she does following Habrman's instructions: she is to massage the witch's feet, then place a wooden log under them. The next day, the princess is to fill mattresses for the old woman's daughter. Habrman tells her to go up a mountain and shout that Habrman is dead, so the birds will help them. Thirdly, the witch orders the princess to produce twelve wedding dresses for her daughter. Sensing that the witch will continue to hound his human wife, Habrman takes the princess with him and both escape the fortress of gold.

As they begin their escape, the old woman's daughter is not far behind. They first transform into a miller and a windmill, a gardener and a garden, and at last throw a comb to magically create a thick forest. At last, the witch herself chases after them; Habrman changes his wife into a branch and himself into a snake. The witch menaces them, but Habrman, in snake form, parlays with her to give up on the pursuit. The witch agrees, as long as Habrman gives her a kiss, then leaves the couple be. Habrman and the princess are free to celebrate a new wedding. Charles Downing sourced this version as from former Alexandropol, modern day Gyumri, collected ca. 1880.

=== Third version: Habermany, the Serpent-Prince ===
In a third version collected by Leon Surmelian, Habermany, the Serpent-Prince, a poor man that sells bramble and bushes for a living finds three eggs in a nest. He takes them home and asks his wife to cook them. He eats two of them; the third hatches a snake that wishes to become their son. One day, the serpent son asks his father to go to the king's court and ask for the princess's hand in marriage. The king rebuffs his proposal and orders his execution twice for this affront. The snake son resurrects him on both occasions. On the third time, the king concedes to the poor man's proposal, but orders him to build an even bigger palace than the royal one; to deliver the king seven camel-loads of precious gems by a diminute man; to fashion a carpet from the royal palace and line it with trees thicker than four men; and to find a unique wedding dress for his daughter. The snake son advises his father to go to the snake hole he found him and to ask a "young mistress" that the "young master" wants something done.

The king at last marries his youngest daughter to the snake son. On the wedding night, after the celebrations, the snake son takes off the snakeskin; he reveals he is a king's son named Habermany, cursed to be a snake for 40 days. If his wife stays quiet about his secret, he may be able to overcome the curse and become disenchanted. The princess is endlessly mocked and belittled by her own family, but takes it in stride for her husband's sake. When her father, the king, announces a grand feast with a follow-up tournament, Habermany says he will take part in the competition under the guise of a mysterious rider, riding on a white horse, and his wife is not to tell anything. A second tournament is organized and Habermany enters it as a Red Rider and as a Black Rider. Fed up with all the incessant mocking, the princess reveals the riders are one and the same: her husband, Habermany. On hearing this, the Black Rider rides to the king's presence, tells his father-in-law he will disappear and the princess can explain him the matter. Just as he warned her, the prince vanishes in a flash, and so does everything he owns.

The princess decides to go after him by wearing iron sandals and a steel cane, and commissions both from a blacksmith named Master Markar. She reaches a castle of bricks, the Crystal Castle, the Copper Castle, the Iron Castle, the Steel Castle, the Silver Castle and finally the Gold Castle. She sees a maidservant fetching water in a jug and asks her if this is the correct destination. The maidservant tells her that her master Habermany is burning, and she is getting water to cool him off. The princess passes herself off as a dervish, says she might have the right medicine to give him, and secretly drops her ring inside the jug. Habermany recognizes the ring. The owner of the Gold Castle, a witch and Habermany's aunt, orders the maidservant to bring the dervish inside.

Once the witch sees her, she suspects she is Habermany's human wife. The witch orders the dervish-princess to go to her sister's house and fetch a rolling pin for her, for they will bake bread for the aunt's daughter's wedding. Habermany advises her how to proceed: to drink from a filthy river and compliment it, to pick up a thorn from a thick bush and compliment it, to give hay to a ram and sheeptail to the wolf, to close an open door and open a closed door, to not eat anything from the witch's house, to get the rolling pin and to run away as quick as she can. She follows his instructions to the letter; the witch's sister tries to command the ram, the wolf, the doors, the thorn bush and the river to stop her in her tracks, but the objects disobey her.

Finally, Habermany and his wife escape with the help of the three horses, by throwing objects behind them to deter the pursuers, the witch and her daughter: a comb becomes a forest of thorns, a block of salt changes into a mountain of salt, and a bottle of water becomes a vast lake. Still, Habermany's aunt and cousin keep chasing the couple. Failing their first plan, Habermany and the princess try to elude the chase by transforming into other people: first, into a bunch of black grapes (Habermany's white horse), white grapes (the princess) and a grape-seller (Habermany); then, into a gardener (Habermany) and pumpkins (the horse and the princess); thirdly, a shepherd (him) and two sheep (the horse and the princess). Their last transformation changes the black horse into a rosebush, the princess into a long stick and himself into a snake coiled around it. The witch notices it is them, but Habermany, as a snake, jumps onto her neck and bites her. Safe at last, they return to the princess's father's kingdom, where they live in happiness and with many children.

== Analysis ==
=== Tale type ===
The tale has also been compared to the Graeco-Roman myth of Cupid and Psyche due to the presence of elements of the tale type 425 of the Aarne-Thompson-Uther Index, "The Search for the Lost Husband", e. g., the breaking of a taboo or prohibition by the wife on her supernatural husband.

=== Motifs ===
==== The serpent prince ====
In a 1979 article, researcher Suzanna A. Gullakian noted that the serpent youth was a popular form of the supernatural husband in Armenian tales, with 12 texts related to two tale types: AT 425 and AT 433.

According to Armenian author and historian Marietta Shaginyan, in Armenian tales the serpent appears as a mysterious and powerful being, but otherwise helpful.

Armenian professor Sargis Petrosyan suggests that the name Habrmani derives etymologically from *Hambar-mani, denoting the snake as a guardian of barns and cereals. He also associates the name with an ancient Armenian cult, across the Shirak province, of the snake as a beneficent being. In the same vein, professor Susan Hoogasian-Villa reported that some Detroit-born Armenian tale informants told about the concept of "saint snakes", ancestral spirits who appear as snakes. They function as protectors of homes - a belief Hoogasian-Villa said was known "in many areas of Armenia".

Scholar James R. Russell, in an article, associates the character of the serpent- or snake-child (Armenian: ōjamanuk) to remnants of villainous serpents of ancient Iranian, Zoroastrian and Armenian myths, like Azhi Dahāka.

==== The heroes' Magic Flight ====
The tale also contains the closing episode of the "Magic Flight" (ATU 313H*). According to Christine Goldberg, some variants of the type 425B show as a closing episode "The Magic Flight" sequence, a combination that appears "sporadically in Europe", but "traditionally in Turkey". Although this episode is more characteristic of tale type ATU 313, "The Magic Flight", some variants of type ATU 425B also show it as a closing episode. German literary critic Walter Puchner argues that the motif attached itself to type 425B, as a Wandermotiv ("Wandering motif").

== Variants ==
Other Armenian variants were published by the Armenian SSR Academy of Sciences in the 1960s.

=== Enchanted Snake ===
In a variant titled ՕՁ֊ՄԱՅԻԼ or Օձ-մայիլ (transliteration: "Odz-Mayil"; Russian: "Чудесный змѣй"; English: "Enchanted Snake"), collected by Haykuni from informant named Arsen Khrimea in the dialect from Vagharshapat, a poor old man finds three eggs in a nest. He goes to the market, sells the firewood he gathered and buys some bread for him and his wife. One day, a snake hatches out of one of the eggs and wants to become their son. The snake asks his father to make a bid for the hand of the princess. The old man sits on a throne or chair in an audience with the king, who scoffs at the old man's attitude and orders his execution.The old man is executed twice, but the snake son resurrects him. The third time, the king finally listens to what the old man has to say: he wants to marry the princess to his son, who is a snake. The king then demands the snake son performs three tasks: to build mansions greater than the royal palace, to plant a tree with a thick trunk, and to find a garment no one has ever seen in the realm. The snake son provides the king with the requested items and marries the princess.

After the marriage, the snake son tells the princess he is human under the snakeskin, and they should wait for 40 days more until his enchantment is over; until then, she is not to tell anyone about it. Some time later, the king organizes a tournament, and the snake prince enters it disguised as a rider in white garments. The next day, the snake prince comes as a Red Rider, and tells his wife that the time is almost up, so she must not tell her family. On the third day, he goes in the guise of a black knight. The princess admits to her sisters the rider is her snake husband. He promptly disappears and she has to go after him until she wears down a steel cane. She dons the clothes of a dervish, and reaches a spring, where a maidservant is fetching water. The princess asks for a bit of water and drops her ring inside the jug. The snake prince recognizes the ring and orders the maidservant to bring the dervish to them.

The snake prince's mother forces the princess to fill a bucket with blood. Next, his mother sends the princess to the "mountain castle", where her sister lives, for her to fetch some wheat from there, since she wants to bake bread. The snake prince advises his wife to compliment a dirty river and a thorny bush, to give the correct food to two animals on the way, to close an open door and open a closed one. The princess follows her husband's instructions to the letter and returns to his mother's home, as her husband's aunt commands her servants to stop her. After she returns to the house, as his family is gathering firewood, the snake prince and the princess decide to make their escape by riding on the horses and throwing objects to hinder their pursuers (a speckle of salt and a bottle of water). Lastly, he turns the princess into a stick and himself into a snake coiled around it. They finally reach the princess's kingdom.

=== The Tale of Mirza Mahmout ===
The collector noted that the story of Habrmani showed nearly identical elements with another Armenian tale, ՄԻՐԶԱ ՄԱՀՄՈԻՏԻ ՀԵՔԻԱԹԸ or Միրզա Մահմուտի հեքիաթը ("Mirza Mahmuti hek’iat’y" or "The Tale of Mirza Mahmout"). In this tale, a poor old couple has prayed to God for a son. When suddenly a snake comes to their house, the couple thinks it will kill them, so they give some food to it hoping it is enough to satisfy the serpent. The snake keeps going back to their house, so he takes off his snakeskin and becomes a human youth. He explains that God sent him as their son, but no one else may know he is a snake being.

One day, he asks his father to ask for the princess's hand in marriage. The king, of course, rebuffs the proposal and tries to force impossible tasks on the youth and his parents: to build a magnificent palace, to decorate the palace with rugs, flowers and marble; and to adorn the streets with dry fruit trees on one side, other fruits on the other side, as well as flowers and many carpets. The serpent son, named Mirza Mahmut, summons the help of two magical Arabs who perform the king's tasks. He then marries the princess.

Mirza Mahmut tells his wife that he will enter an upcoming tournament held by the king by riding three horses, one black, one red and one white; her sister may offend her, but she is not to tell them he is the mysterious rider, lest he disappears from her life forever. She betrays his trust and breaks his prohibition; he vanishes and she has to seek him out. She wears a pair of shoes and goes to a person on the road, who knows the way to Mirza Mahmout; she advises that, when she next meets an "ogress" on her way there, while the ogress is making bread, she should suckle on the ogress's breasts to make her trust the princess. The princess suckles the ogress's breasts and, in return, the ogress protects her when ogress's sons come home. The princess explains she is looking for her husband, and the ogress's sons tell her that Mirza is to be married to another woman in 40 days' time.

The princess finds the location of her husband, where she sees a servant fetching water from a spring. The princess passes herself as a man and asks the servant to drink a bit of the water and gives her gold in exchange. The servant tells Mirza Mahmut that a man is by the spring, and orders the servants to take the man in. The false bride's mother forces the princess to bathe Mirza Mahmut's horse, and to go the mountain gather feathers to fill her daughter's mattress. As a third task, the old woman orders the princess to go to another witch's house with a box and get the drum from there. Mirza Mahmout advises her that she will have to give the correct food for the lion and the donkey on the way, to close an open door and open a closed door; and not to eat anything once she gets there; get the drum and leave the place immediately. The princess does as instructed and brings the drum to the false bride's wedding.

Lastly, the old woman ties ten candles to the princess's fingers, in a position that forces her to hold all candles and not drop them. As Mirza Mahmout and the old woman's daughter marry, the snake prince goes to the princess, tears off the candles from her hands, and kills the false bride by tossing her in the hearth and burning her. Mirza Mahmout escapes with his human wife; as they are chased by the old woman's sons, they transform into other people to fool them. When the old woman herself comes after them, they climb up a thorny tree; she picks up a stone, and the dragon kills her. Mirza Mahmout and the princess rejoin their families and live happily ever after. This tale was sourced by Armenian scholarship as coming from Basen, Armenia.

== See also ==
- The King of Love
- Ulv Kongesøn (Prince Wolf)
- The Golden Root
- The Horse-Devil and the Witch
- Tulisa, the Wood-Cutter's Daughter
- Khastakhumar and Bibinagar
- Yasmin and the Serpent Prince
- Baemsillang (The Serpent Husband)
- Amewakahiko soshi
- Dragon-Child and Sun-Child
- The Tale of Aftab
