= The Tale of Aftab =

Azerbaijani fairy tale

The Tale of Aftab (Azerbaijani: Aftabın nağılı) is an Azerbaijani fairy tale, about a maiden that marries a man in a snakeskin disguise, reveals the secret about his identity and has to search for him, eventually finding him at his mother's house, where she is forced to perform difficult tasks for her.

The tale is related to the international cycle of the Animal as Bridegroom or The Search for the Lost Husband, in that a heroine marries a supernatural husband in animal shape, loses him, and has to seek him out. It is also classified in the international Aarne-Thompson-Uther Index as tale type 425B, "Son of the Witch", thus distantly related to the Graeco-Roman myth of Cupid and Psyche.

== Source ==
The tale was collected from an informant named Savalan Süleymanov, from Siyaqut village, in Şərur rayonu.

== Summary ==
A brother and his sister, named Pəri, live together, with him hunting while she stays home. One day, he hunts some game and prepares its heart, when a snake appears, coils itself around the heart and demands the man's sister Pəri as his bride, or prepare to die. The snake makes it plain that the youth cannot avoid his threat even if he hides in the depths of the earth or up in the sky. He returns home and explains the situation to Pəri, who decides to go with the snake to save her brother. Pəri's brother delivers her to the snake by a spring. Ten days later, the youth pays a visit to his sister by the fountain, and enters the snake's castle. Pəri welcomes him and says Aftab is a human being under the snakeskin, so her brother asks her how can they destroy his snakeskin. He calls for other brothers and sisters and they prepare the tandoor to burn the animal disguise, but Aftab appears and warns them not to do it, since she will regret it. Aftab leaves for a month and Pəri's family burns the snakeskin in a tandoor. Aftab discovers the deed and admonishes his wife, saying that she will only find him again by wearing iron shoes and walking with an iron scepter.

Pəri follows after her husband in iron garments, and wanders the world until she reaches a spring, where a maidservant is fetching water. The maidservant explains she is bringing water to Aftab, since he fell in love with a human and now his body is burning after they burned his snakeskin. Pəri drops her ring into the jug, which the maidservant brings to Aftab. Aftab goes to drink water and finds the ring, then asks his mother if a human was to come to their house, would she devour them? His mother promises not to do it, and Aftab orders the maidservant to bring the person at the spring. It happens thus, and Aftab recognizes his human wife, Pəri. Despite his mother promising not to harm her, she devises ways to kill the girl: first, she gives Pəri a pair of scissors that do not cut and orders her to deliver it down the mountain. Aftab intercepts his wife and tells her to drop the scissors there, fetch some clothes and rush back up the mountain. Pəri does as instructed, steals the clothes and makes her way up the mountain, with some voices echoing threats at her. Aftab's mother suspects the task was not Pəri's doing, but her son's, and gives her an ax with an order to go into the forest and bring back forty camel loads of firewood. Aftab tells Pəri to enter the forest and shout that Aftab is getting married, and needs forty loads of firewood in camels. Pəri does as instructed and forty camels come from the forest carrying bundles of firewood on their backs.

Thirdly, Aftab's mother tells Pəri to go to her sister and ask for the dastarkhan ("dəstərxanı") and the frying pan ("tavasını") for the wedding. Aftab intercepts Pəri and advises her how to proceed: pass by a thornbush and compliment it, compliment a river of white water, compliment a pool of black water by saying she would bathe and swim in it, reach his aunt's house and ask for the dastarkhan and the pan; while she goes to another room to sharpen her teeth, Pəri is to steal the objects and rush back. Pəri follows his instructions to the letter and steals the dartarkhan and the pan, as his aunt commands her servants to stop the girl, to no avail. Finally, Aftab's mother arranges his wedding to his cousin, and places candles on Pəri's slippers, for the girl to illuminate the wedding couple. Pəri suffers for the burning on her feet, when Aftab beheads his cousin and throws her head across the room, takes his human wife and both escape from his mother's house. The next morning, Aftab's mother finds her niece dead and the couple gone, and sends her daughters after their brother. On the road, Aftab and Pəri transform themselves to trick their pursuers: first, into a chicken (him) with its chicks (her); then, into a Mollah (him) and a house (her); lastly, into a melon patch (her) and a garden keeper (him).

== Analysis ==
=== Tale type ===
Azerbaijani scholarship indexes the tale as the Azerbaijani tale type 428, "Div qarısının qulluğunda" ("In the service of the Div woman"). In the Azeri type, the heroine marries a snake who is a human youth underneath it; convinced by her sisters, she burns his snakeskin and he vanishes; she dons iron shoes and goes after him, eventually finding him at the house of the Div woman, to whom she has to perform difficult tasks; with her husband's help, the heroine fulfills the tasks, then both flee in a transformation sequence, their third transformation a flower (the heroine) and a snake coiled around it (the snake husband).

In the Azerbaijani Folktale Index, Azeri type 428 corresponds to Turkish tale type 98. In the Typen türkischer Volksmärchen ("Turkish Folktale Catalogue"), by Wolfram Eberhard and Pertev Naili Boratav, Turkish type TTV 98, "Der Pferdemann" ("The Horse Man"), corresponded in the international classification to tale type AaTh 425. (Note: Some publications use the initials EB or EbBo to refer to their catalogue.)

In his monograph about Cupid and Psyche, Swedish scholar Jan-Öjvind Swahn acknowledged that Turkish type 98 was subtype 425A of his analysis, that is, "Cupid and Psyche", being the "oldest" and containing the episode of the witch's tasks. In the international index, however, Swahn's typing is indexed as type ATU 425B, "The Son of the Witch": the heroine marries a man in animal shape, betrays his secret and seeks his out; after a long journey, she finds him at his mother's house, where she is forced to perform difficult tasks for her, which she accomplishes with her husband's secret help.

=== Combinations ===
According to the Azerbaijani Folktale Index, Azeri type 428 can be found in combination with another type, Azeri type 433*, "Şahzadə qıza aşiq olmuş ilan" ("A snake in love with a princess"): a poor man finds an egg in a tree that hatches a snake; the snake is adopted by the man and fulfills the king's suitor's tasks; the snake marries the princess and removes his snakeskin at night, becoming a handsome youth.

=== Motifs ===
According to Swedish scholar Jan Öjvind Swahn's study on Animal as Bridegroom tales, a characteristic motif that occurs in the "Indo-Persian" area is the heroine using a ring to signal her arrival to her husband, when she finds his location.

According to Turkish scholarship, the snake is the second most common animal in tales of the Turkic-speaking world featuring the marriage between a human person and an animal. In the tales, a person marries a snake due to a threat to themselves or to a relative, like a father, a mother or a sibling. However, the snake is usually the cursed form of a person.

==== The heroes' Magic Flight ====
According to Christine Goldberg, some variants of the type 425B show as a closing episode "The Magic Flight" sequence, a combination that appears "sporadically in Europe", but "traditionally in Turkey". Although this episode is more characteristic of tale type ATU 313, "The Magic Flight", some variants of type ATU 425B also show it as a closing episode. German literary critic Walter Puchner argues that the motif attached itself to type 425B, as a Wandermotiv ("Wandering motif").

== Variants ==
=== Tales with snakes ===
==== Shamsi-Kamar ====
Azerbaijani folklorist Hanafi Zeynalli published an Azeri tale titled "Шамси-Камар" ("Shamsi-Kamar" or "Sun-Moon"). In this tale, three daughters of a king arrange for their marriages: they should cast three arrows at random, see where they land and marry the man that lives wherever the arrows land on. The two elders marry the son of a vizier and the son of a "vekila", while the youngest's arrow lands on a bush, where she waits next to. A snake comes out of it and invites her to a house, where he takes out his snakeskin to reveal he is a human named Shamsi-Kamar, also warning she must not tell anyone his secret, lest she will have to wear down a pair of iron shoes and walk with an iron cane until she finds him again. Upon a visit from her family, the princess tells her mother about the snakeskin, which her mother burns in a fire. Shamsi-Kamar enters the room, admonishes his wife and disappears. The princess follows his instructions and wanders the world for seven years, until her pair of iron shoes is worn out. Nearby, she sees some servant girls fetching water for their master, Shamsi-Kamar. The princess drops her ring on a jug that is taken to her husband, and he notices it. He brings her home on the pretense of having her as a maid. His father, then, orders her to fetch firewood in the forest. Her husband teaches her how to perform it: she must go to the woods and shout out that Shamsi-Kamar has died, and the firewood is for his pyre. That night, his father marries Shamsi-Kamar to another girl, but the prince goes to the kitchen, heats up two cauldrons of water, takes them and pours the scalding hot water on his second wife. He and the princess then escape on horses back to her kingdom. At the end of the tale, his family runs after them, but, on not finding them, return home empty-handed. The compiler classified the tale as type 425, and located its source as collected in 1930, in Nakhkray (Nakhchivan Autonomous Republic). The tale was also republised in Azerbaijan language as Şəmsi Qəmər and to Turkish as Şemsi Kamer.

==== The Woodcutter's Daughter ====
In an Azeri tale from Nakhchivan with the title Odunçu qızı, or in dialectal South Azerbaijani Odunçu Ḳızı ("The Woodcutter's Daughter"), a poor man has three daughters and gathers firewood to sell. One day, a snake appears on a bundle and demands one of the man's daughters. Despite promising to fulfill the snake's request, he ignores it and takes another route for firewood the next day. However, the same snake meets the man and repeats his demand. The man returns home and explains the situation to his daughters: the elder two refuse to go with the snake, save the youngest. The girl is guided to the place of the snake, and a man appears to take her to a large house, the palace of the divs. The snake, in human form, brings the girl with him to the palace. The tale explains he is the son of a div (a giantess) and has been betrothed to his aunt's daughter. He gives her a broom and advises her to agree to do whatever his mother asks of her, but to call on him. The div mother orders the girl to bring the broom with her, and for her to sweep the floor for her son's wedding, in a way that no place is wet and no place is dry in equal measure - the snake man uses his powers to summon a light rain and a gust of wind to fulfill the task. The dev mother suspects her son did it, but accepts the result of the task. Later, she writes a letter to her dev sister with a message to eat the human girl when she arrives there, then sends the girl with the letter to the dev sister, to also ask for a tambourine. The snake man intercepts the girl, reads the letter, and advises her to deliver the letter and, when his aunt is distracted sharpening her teeth, she is to take the tambourine from a shelf and rush back. The girl does as instructed, and the dev aunt shouts at her to return. Finally, the dev mother arranges her son's wedding to his cousin: she pins the human girl to the wall, casts a spell to hold her in that position and places a candle between her fingers, so that the candle melts and the girl burns. The dev family brings the snake man's cousin and they marry. At night, the snake man undoes his mother's spell on the human girl, pins his cousin to the wall and makes her hold the candle, then escapes with the girl. The next morning, the dev family finds the couple gone and the cousin burnt to cinders, and chase after them. On the road, the snake man and the girl realize they are being pursued and transform into other objects to deceive them: first, into a stump (the girl) and a snake coiled around it (the man); next, into a pool (him) and a flower floating on it (the girl). His dev family fails to find them, and the couple make their way through the desert into a locked castle. The girl utters aloud "let me be dead", and enters the castle, the snake man remaining outside. The tale then continues as another tale type.

==== Snake Son ====
In a Azerbaijani tale titled İlan oğlan ("Snake Son"), a poor couple live together, and he forages for wood. One day, he finds an egg under a tree which he brings home. Suddenly, a snake hatches from the egg which the man tries to kill, but the snake wants to become their son. Time passes, and the snake asks his adoptive human father to court the local padishah's daughter on his behalf. The man admits they are poor, but the snake asks the man to go back to the same tree he found the egg and say that they want a large seven-story house. It happens thus, and the poor couple's hut turns into a large house. Soon, the man goes to fulfill the snake's marriage request. The padishah brings the old man to his presence, hears about the man's proposal, and orders him to extend a carpet between the palace and the man's house. The man reports to the snake son, who sends his adoptive father to the same tree with a request to create the carpet. The man sends for the padishah, who pays a visit to the poor couple and sees the large house and the carpet. The padishah agrees to marry his only daughter to the man's son. The princess meets her bridegroom, the snake, and screams in terror. The snake asks the princess to step on his tail. It happens thus, and a handsome youth comes out of the snakeskin, who asks the princess to keep his secret, lest he vanishes, and she will have to search for him for seven years by wearing down pairs of iron shoes and an iron cane, until she finds two maidservants fetching water and she will place her ring inside a jug.

The princess keeps her word about his secret. In time, a foreign king attacks the realm, and the padishah asks his daughter about who can protect them. The princess cries to her husband about it, and the snake son goes to help his father-in-law by asking his adoptive father to go to the tree: on the first day, for red garments and a red horse; on the second day, for black garments and a black horse, and on the third day for white garments and a white horse. The snake husband joins the battle to defend his father-in-law's kingdom, but falls in battle on the third day and is captured. The princess cries to her father that the knight they captured was her husband. As soon as she utters the words, the captured knight begins to catch fire and vanishes. The princess mourns for her loss, and, remembering his words, dons iron garments and goes after him. She passes by a flock of sheep, a herd of cows and a herd of horses - all belonging to her husband, the snake son. She also learns that the cows and horses are burning, just like her husband. Finally, she reaches a fountain and realizes that her iron shoes and iron cane are worn out, then sights two maidservants fetching water to Snake Son, who has been burning for the past seven years. She asks for some water to drink and drops her ring into a jug. The maidservants bring the water to Snake Son, who drinks the water and recognizes the ring. He learns of the stranger by the fountain, and the princess is brought in.

Snake Son's aunt, who is from the race of the "məleykə" ('angels') and wishes to marry him to her daughter, discovers his nephew's wife is there and begins to force hard tasks on her: first, to fill a jar with a sieve - Snake Son recites a prayer and fills the jar with water. Next, the princess is given a bag and ordered to fill it with pigeon feathers - Snake Son advises her to take a tent up a mountain, open up the bag and shout, and the birds will come to shed their feathers. Thirdly, the woman orders the princess to go to a sister of the aunt and get from there a comb. Snake Son intercepts his wife and advises her how to proceed: compliment a crooked tree by saying it looks straight, compliment a straight tree by saying it looks bent; open a closed door, shut an open one, compliment a ditch filled with dirty water by saying it contains crystal clear water; compliment a clear stream by saying it contains muddy water; exchange the fodder between two animals (bone for a dog, hay for a horse), meet his aunt and ask for the comb, then rush back. The princess follows his instructions to the letter, steals the comb and races back, the creature commanding her servants to stop her, to no avail. Despite her best efforts, Snake Son's aunt cannot kill the princess, so Snake Son escapes with his wife on the wind horse, and his aunt sends her daughters after them. On the road, Snake Son transforms himself and the princess into other people to fool their pursuers: a shepherd (him) and a sheep (her), a watermelon keeper (him) and a watermelon (her). Lastly, his aunt goes after the couple, and he turns the princess into a rose and himself into a snake coiled around it. His aunt approaches the pair and asks the snake if he has fallen in love with the girl. Snake Son admits it, and his aunt leaves them be. Snake Son and the princess return home to her kingdom and he restores his adoptive parents' palace. The tale was originally collected from an informant named Əliyeva Tükəzban Oruc in the village of Khanliglar, Qazax rayonu.

==== Iron Cane, Iron Shoes ====
In a tale from South Azerbaijan, collected by author Samad Behrangi and translated to Azerbaijani with the title Dəmir əsa, dəmir başmaq ("Iron Cane, Iron Shoes"), three princesses reach marriageable age, but, since their father, the king forgot about it, send him a basket with three melons of varying states of ripeness as analogy to their marriageability. The vizier interprets it is past time to marry the princesses, and the vizier, under order of the king, orders for the young men of the city to assemble at the square the following day for each princess to throw apples at their husbands of choice. The following morning, the elder princess throws her apple to the vizier's son, the middle one to the lawyer's son, and the youngest princess throws her and it lands in a ruin next to a stone. They lift the stone and out comes a snake. The cadette princess goes relents and goes to marry the snake. The animal removes the snakesin and becomes a handsome youth. Some time later, the princess's sisters pay her a visit and notice the handsome brother-in-law. The cadette explains what happened to her, and her sisters ask whether she can destroy his snakeskin. She goes home and asks her husband how to destroy the snakeskin; he slaps her for the question. The princess's heart burns and her face turns red, but the snake husband reveals: with garlic peels. The following morning, while the snake husband leaves his snakeskin at home to go to the bathhouse, the princess burns the snakeskin with garlic peels. Her husband appears to her and admonishes her for her deed, but tells her that she can find him after wearing down seven iron rods and seven iron pairs of basmaq (a type of footwear), with a barley bread, for wherever they are torn down, she will find him there. He then vanishes. The princess's father tells her to leave the snake husband behind, since he can find another suitor for her, but she has none of it and decides to look for him walking with seven pairs of iron shoes and with seven iron canes.

After a long quest of seven years, she finally reaches a fountain, washes her hands and face and breaks her bread to eat. She then sees a servant coming to draw water with a jug, and asks for some. The servant says that the water is for her uncle and refuses the princess's request, so the princess curses the water to become blood. The servant brings water to Məlikməmməd, who notices the blood instead of water. The servant informs him about the stranger at the fountain, and Məlikməmməd orders the servant to give them water. The servant returns to the fountain and gives the princess some water to drink, so the princess drops her ring inside the jug. Her husband finds the ring and goes to meet his wife outside. They reunite and warns her that his relatives are all devs that may devours her, including his mother, his father, his aunt so he casts a spell to turn her into an apple, and returns to the house. Suddenly, his mother comes down from the sky like an ifrit and senses a human smell. Məlikməmməd tries to deflect the question by saying it must be something she ate. Məlikməmməd then asks his mother to swear not to devour the human, and restores the princess to human form, lying that she is his sister.

However, his mother suspects something, since Məlikməmməd is to be married to his cousin. Thus, the dev-creature orders the princess to go to her sister and fetch a box ("qutusun") of "mahana". Məlikməmməd intercepts his wife before she goes to his maternal aunt ("xala"), warns this is a trap to kill her, and advises her how to proceed: compliment a pool of dirty water, compliment a thorny bramble saying it has needles, exchange the correct fodder for animals (bones for a dog, barley for a horse), open a closed door and shut an open one, open the folded rug and fold an extended rug, then meet with his aunt; while she goes to sharpen her teeth, take the box and escape as soon as possible without looking back, otherwise she may turn to stone. The princess follows his words to the letter and meets her husband's maternal aunt. The dev-aunt goes to another room to sharpen her teeth, when the princess takes the box and rushes back. The dev-aunt commands her servants to stop her, to no avail. On the road back, the princess decides to see what is inside the box and opens it; she hears a voice inviting her to see its contents, but she closes it. The princess delivers the box to the div-mother, who suspects that this was Məlikməmməd's doing. Next, the Div-mother asks the princess to fetch feathers for Məlikməmməd's wedding, for a blanket and mattress - Məlikməmməd advises the princess to go to the bird garden and summon the birds by saying it is Məlikməmməd's wedding, and the birds will give their feathers.

On the wedding night, Məlikməmməd's dev-mother tells him she wants to let the human princess to stay with them for the night, but Məlikməmməd says to let her sleep with him. He then tells the princess to boil a pot of water, and fetch a knife, some salt, and water. The bride and groom enter the room, and everyone goes to sleep. Məlikməmməd wakes up, takes his aunt's daughter and tosses her inside the cooking pot, then escapes with the princess on a horse. The following morning, Məlikməmməd's mother goes to check on the wedding couple, and find no one, save for the dead bride being cooked inside the boiling pot. His dev-family mourns for their dead relative, and chase after the escaping couple. On the road, Məlikməmməd notices they are being pursued and tells the princess to throw behind the objects to hinder them: the knife creates a field of daggers to hurt his relatives' feet; the salt to create a salt marsh to hurt their wounds. Since they see that they are closing in, Məlikməmməd turns himself, the princess and their horse into a melon, a melon tree and a melon farmer. The devs stop to rest under the tree and fall asleep. Məlikməmməd then seizes the opportunity to continue their flight, and restores them to normal forms. The dev-mother and the dev-aunt wake up, find no trace of the melon tree, deduce that this was Məlikməmməd's magic, and go after them. Məlikməmməd and the princess throw behind the water which creates a vast sea between them and his dev-relatives, who ask Məlikməmməd to cross the water back to them. Məlikməmməd ignores them and takes the princess to her city.

=== Tales with other animals ===
==== The Shepherd's Donkey Foal ====
In an Azeri Turk tale collected in Tabriz, Iran, with the title Nahırçı Goduğu ("The Shepherd's Donkey Foal"), a herdsman has a wife. He knocks on people's doors, gathers the cows and goes to graze them, then returns tired at night. One day, he prays to Allah to be given a son, even if he is a donkey cub, so that his son can graze the cattle while he rests. Suddenly, a donkey appears to the herdsman and calls the man his father. The donkey son herds the cattle in his father's place, and returns at night. One evening, the donkey son asks his adoptive mother to court the local shah's daughter. Despite some reluctance, the herdsman's wife goes to talk to the shah and sits on the ambassador's stone. The shah orders the woman to fill the royal treasury with ruby jewels and guards to guard it. The woman returns home and tells the donkey son about the hard task, but the donkey tells her not to worry: the donkey leaves his house before sunrise, goes to the foot of a mountain and asks someone to provide the jewels and the guards. The shah's court notices that the treasury was filled and informs the shah about it. The monarch calls his daughter and admits that the prospective bridegroom is special, so the princess agrees to marry the donkey. At night, the donkey foal removes his asinine skin and reveals himself to be a handsome prince with hair half in gold and half in silver. The prince asks the princess to keep the secret, otherwise he will vanish.

Days later, the Shah's wife asks for her husband to bring her daughter as a guest, accompanied by their soldiers. It happens thus, and the princess is brought to her mother. The queen asks her about her marriage with the donkey, and the princess reveals that he removes his skin at night to become a handsome prince. The queen advises her to burn the donkeyskin with barley flour to keep him in human form, for people to see his true form. The princess returns home and, after dinner, she burns the donkeyskin and goes to bed. In the morning, the donkey prince tries to locate the animal skin, but finds it burnt down. He tells the princess he will depart, and she has to wear down başmah (a type of footwear) made of iron and melt an iron cane in her hands if she wants to find him, turns into a bird and flies away. The princess mourns for the missing husband for a time, then dons the iron apparel and goes after him. After a long journey, she reaches a spring where she washes her face and drinks some water. She notices that her iron shoes are torn down and so is the iron cane, which means she is close to her husband. Suddenly, two devs (giants) come to the spring, so the princess climbs up a tree to hide. The devs go to draw water and see the princess's visage in water, thinking she is in the water, so they run away to inform the other devs. Melik Memmed, the donkey prince, overhears their conversation and notices that his wife is there. The leader of the devs, his aunt, orders Melik Memmed to bring in the human. Melik Memmed reunites with his wife at the spring and explains that the leader of the devs is his aunt, who wants to see him married to her daughter, so she has to be careful. Melik Memmed brings the princess as another servant for his aunt.

One day, the dev-aunt sends the princess to her sister to fetch a kaval (a type of flute) for her daughter's wedding - a trap. Melik Memmed intercepts his wife and advises her how to proceed: he points to the dev's house atop the mountain, and she is to close an open door, open a closed one, exchange the fodder between two animals (barley for a horse, bone for a dog), meet his aunt while she is preparing flatbread, take the flute and escape. The princess does as instructed and flees with the flute, with the dev-aunt ordering the doors and the animal to stop her, to no avail. The princess delivers the kaval to the dev-leader, who wants to kill the human, but Melik Memmed observes her. The princess goes to talk to Melik Memmed outside the dev-palace and finds him saddling a winged horse for their escape. They flee on the horse. The dev-leader realizes the couple have escaped and goes after them on her horse. On the road, Melik Memmed and the princess notice they are being chased, and Melik Memmed utters a verdi to stop their pursuers: first, a field of razors appears to tumble the dev and the horse; secondly, water gushes forth to wound the Dev's legs; and thirdly, salt springs to hurt the Dev, who finally falls to the ground. Melik Memmed breaks the Devs' spells and returns with the princess to the shah's palace. The shah nominates Melik Memmed as his vizier, and brings Melik Memmed's adoptive parents to live there.

==== The Youngest Daughter ====
Azerbaijani literary critic Ehliman Ahundov collected an Azeri tale titled Küçük Bacı ("The Youngest Daughter"), translated to Turkish as Kiçik Bacı ("The Youngest Daughter"), sourced from Fuzuli rayonu. In this tale, a king has three daughters, the elder married to a vizier's son, the middle one to a politician's son, and the youngest still unmarried. One day, a little dog comes which she pets and feeds it for two days. When the little animal does not show up on the third day, she feels downcast, and the king forbids her from approaching the dog again, ordering her governess to inform him if it does so. The next time, the dog comes again, which the king threatens to kill. The princess intercedes in the animal's favour and is banished for her efforts. The girl and the dog move out to a cavern, where three other dogs are, and the pack hunts food for them. One day, the princess finds a handsome youth near the entrance of the cave: he says he is the dog, but his true form is that of the human-like son of the king of the fairies, named Hesenzard. The elder princesses go to look for their cadette and find her in the cave. She tells them about the fairy prince, and the elder sisters suggest she burns the dogskin. After they leave, the princess asks Hesenzard how to burn the dogskin: with onion peels. The princess burns it, Hesenzard turns into a dove and admonishes her, saying that she will only find him again if she wears out iron shoes and an iron cane bends, then flies away. The princess commissions the iron garments and begins her long journey.

After seven years, the princess notices the iron apparel is worn out and reaches a fountain, where a maidservant is fetching water for Hesenzard. The princess asks for some water to drink and drops a ring inside it. Hesenzard recognizes the ring when it drops on his hands and he goes to meet the princess near the fountain. They reunite, he turns her into an apple and brings her inside. He meets his grandmother and introduces the princess. The grandmother, of an evil nature, begins to order the princess: first, she is to sweep the floor with a beaded broom and not lose any, and wash the door and the chimney with her tears, in a way that the drops do not touch each other. Hesenzard summons a group of servants to fulfill the task for her. Next, the grandmother orders her to fulfill sacks with bird feathers: Hesenzard advises her to climb a mountain, summon the birds and tell them Hesenzard is getting married, and the birds will give them their feathers. During the night, Hesenzard teaches his human wife some verses that will calm his grandmother down. The next day, the woman gives a bar of soap and a black felt and orders the princess to wash it white - Hesenzard casts a spell for the felt to change colours. The grandmother then gives the princess a letter to be given to her sister and trade it for a "gаvalı" ("kavalı", 'pipe') - a trap, since the letter contains a command to eat the princess. Hesenzard intercepts his wife, warns her it is a trap, and advises her how to proceed: compliment a stream of black water, compliment a stream of white water, compliment the water droplets dropping from the roof, open a closed door and shut an open one, fold an unfolded carpet and unfold a folded one, exchange the fodders between two animals (oats for a horse, bone for a dog), give a thread to a person, deliver the letter and, while she is distracted, steal the gаvalı and rush back.

The princess follows the instructions to the letter, steals the gаvalı and rushes back, the grandmother's sister commanding her servants to stop the princess, to no avail. For the next task, the woman orders the princess to plant a tree to reach the Heavens ("külefirengi", in the original). Hesenzard casts a spell and the tree sprouts. When they are climbing the tree, Hesenzard kills the false bride and escapes with his human wife. On the road, they turn into a mountain of salt (the princess) and a mountain of blades (Hesenzard), a garden (the princess) and a garden-keeper (Hesenzard). The false bride's sisters plucks a pear and accidentally bites off three fingers from the princess's hand. After the creature leaves, Hesenzard restores the princess's fingers and they return to the cave.

== See also ==
- Grünkappe
- Habrmani
- The Princess Who Could Not Keep a Secret
- The Snake-Prince Sleepy-Head
- Yasmin and the Serpent Prince
- Chötiktscha
