= Kaloghlan =

Turkic and Altai fictional character

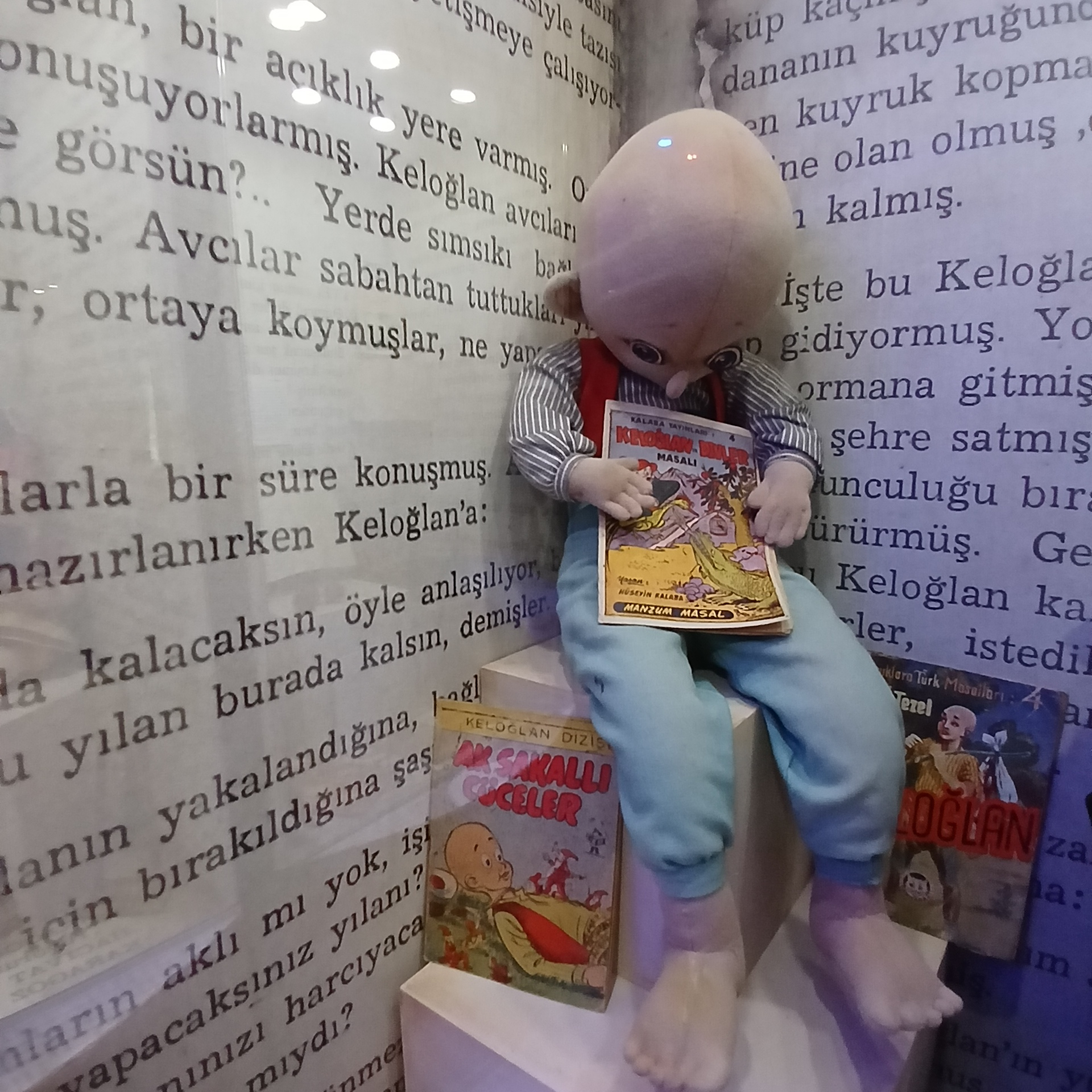
Keloglan figure and books at Kartal Fairy Tale Museum.

Keloğlan (Turkish: 'bald boy') is a fictional character that appears in Turkic and Altai folklore, legends, and fairy tales.

== In folklore ==
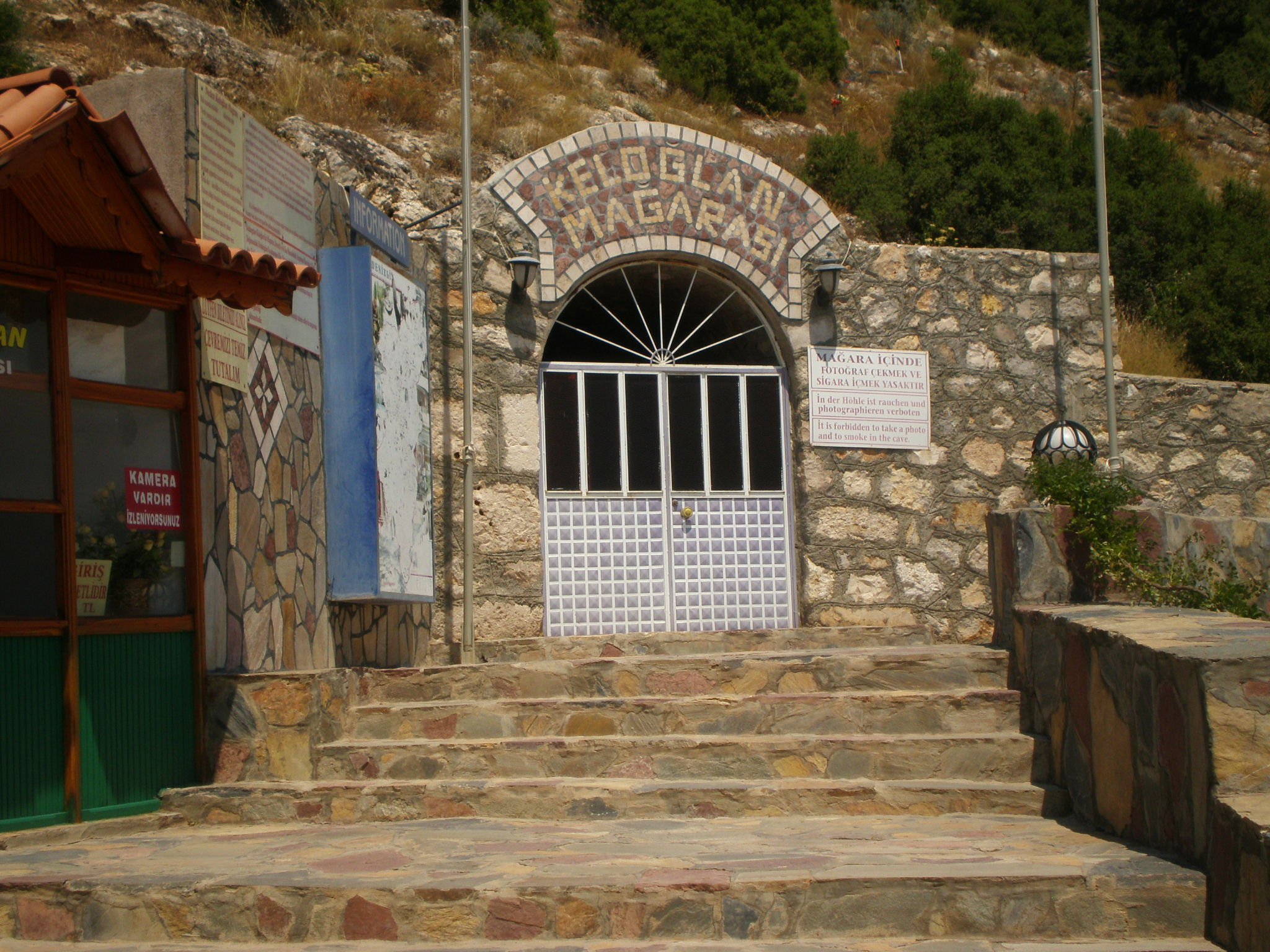
Entrance of Keloglan Cave. Denizli, Acıpayam, Dodurga, Eşeler Mountain.

A well-known character in Turkish folklore, Keloğlan, also known as Keleşoğlan, has the problem of being bald from birth. Despite an ugly outer appearance, he is still a clever and lucky character. He represents the characteristics of the Anatolian people.

His main characteristics are his honesty, bravery, helpfulness, cunning and sometimes gullibility. Usually appearing as the son of a poor couple, a poor woman or the grandchild of an old woman, Keloglan seems to be clumsy and lazy at the beginning. However, as the events of the story unfold, it is revealed that he is actually cunning, brave and skillful as he overcomes obstacles that are not expected from someone like him.

=== Names ===
The character appears in the folklore of the Turkic peoples. Aside from his presence in Anatolia, the character is also known as Taşza Bala in Kazakhstan, Keçel, Keçel Memed or Keçel Yeğen in Azerbaijan; Keçeloğlan in Kirkuk; Kelcebatır in Turkmenistan; Tazoğlan in Crimea; Tas or Tasarakay among Altai people; Keçel in Iran and as Kel Kafalı Kaz Çobanı in Georgian stories. Similarly, the character is also named Keçelok among the Kurdish of Mardin and Kure Käcäl among the Azerbaijani Kurdish.

=== Parallels ===
French folklorist Paul Delarue noted that Keloglan corresponded to the Western (French) hero Le Teigneux, a youth of lowly status and/or ugly appearance that saves the day and wins the princess.

== Major stories ==
Keloglan-like characters appears frequently in Turkish fairy tales. According to Tahir Alangu, there are 15 types of main Keloglan stories; however, today there are countless more fairy tales that are told or written as a Keloglan story. Some of these are stories that are attributed to Keloglan by the author themselves.

Some fairy tales that Keloglan appears as the main character are as follows:

- Keloglan and Kose
- Keloglan and His Sibling
- Open, O Table
- Keloglan Buys Nothing
- The Reward of the Cat, Dog and the Snake
- The Alicengiz Game
- Keloglan Revives the Dead
- Keloglan and the Bathouse Attendant
- The Beardless Miller
- The Dead That Got Thrown Out of the Chimney
- The Giant and Keloglan
- Keloglan and His Crow
- The Giantess and Keloglan
- Keloglan and the Giants
- The Crippled Giant

== Popular culture ==
Stories about him were staged by Fisko Birlik, Danone Çocuk Tiyatroları and many special societies many times and attracted a lot of attention and applause.

The Turkish state-operated children's TV channel, TRT Çocuk, aired a series titled Keloğlan Masalları from 2008 to 2016, in which the original storyline was partially retained and largely reimagined.

Also, his tale was serialized by Necdet Şen in his comic book Hizli Gazeteci in 1989 at Cumhuriyet newspaper. In 1991, Remzi Bookstore published a book telling a story about him not being able to fit in and having to make a choice between the rules and his own principles.
