= Walter Puchner =

- Born: 12 May 1947 (age 79); Vienna, Austria

Academic work
- Discipline: Theatre studies
- Institutions: National and Kapodistrian University of Athens

Walter Puchner (born 1947) is an Austrian writer, critic and university professor on theatre studies. He has made significant work on the theatrology of Greece, the greater area of the Mediterranean, the Balkans, and Byzantium, on folkloristics but also on a variety of other subjects concerning the culture of the area with more than 80 books and numerous studies and critiques.

== Biography ==
He was born on 12 May 1947 in Vienna. He studied in the University of Vienna, from which he obtained a doctorate of philosophy in 1972. In 1977 he was proclaimed Privatdozent of the University of Vienna and since then he resides in Greece, since he married the pediatrician Ariadne Malamitse. He then went on to teaching in the philosophical school of the University of Crete of which he also became president in 1987 while he was also teaching in the University of Graz. He started teaching in the University of Athens from 1989, and is now an emeritus there.

He has taught in many universities as a visitor, in some as a senior visiting scholar of the US branch of the Alexander S. Onassis Foundation (Alexander S. Onassis Public Benefit Foundation (USA)).

== Awards and honours ==
Puchner has received awards and honours in the country of his origin, Austria, as well as in Greece.

- Since 17 May 1994 he is an honorary member of the Austrian Academy of Sciences (Österreichische Akademie der Wissenschaften).
- In 1995 the Academy of Athens awarded Puchner with the award of the institute of Kostas and Elene Ourane for his book "Ανιχνεύοντας τη θεατρική παράδοση" ("Detecting the theatrical tradition").
- In 2000 he received the Award of Panagiotis Photeas for socio-political thinking essay for his work "Ο μίτος της Αριάδνης" ("Ariadne's thread").
- In 2001 he received the Austrian Decoration for Science and Art (Österreichisches Ehrenzeichen für Wissenschaft und Kunst).
- In his honour was published a book in 2007 titled "Στέφανος. Τιμητική προσφορά για τον Βάλτερ Πούχνερ" ("Stephen. Honorary contribution for Walter Puchner"), where it is mentioned that he is the theatrologist with most studies in the Greek area, covering a huge thematical area geographically and chronologically (Cretan, Septinsular, Aegean religious but also modern theatre, in the Danubian Principalities, from the Enlightenment to the 20th century. It also mentions the subjects published on the folklore, comparative philology and culture of the entirety of the Balkans.
- In 2008 Puchner received the Great Award of Theatre of the Union of Thearticians – Musical Critics for his books "Τα Σούτσεια. Μελέτες στην ελληνική ρομαντική δραματουργία 1830-1850" and "Συμπτώσεις και αναγκαιότητες. Δέκα θεατρολογικά μελετήματα".
