= Feather O' My Wing =

Irish fairy tale

Feather O' My Wing is an Irish fairy tale collected and published by Irish author Seumas MacManus. The tale belongs to the international cycle of the Animal as Bridegroom as a subtype, with few variants reported across Europe and in Ireland. In it, the heroine is delivered to a cursed or enchanted prince, but breaks a taboo and loses him; later, she finds work elsewhere and wards off the unwanted advances of male suitors with the magical object her enchanted husband gave her.

== Summary ==
A gentleman who lives in Connaught has three daughters. One day, a magpie lands on a rich gentleman's shoulders. The man tries to shoo it away, but lets the bird perch on his shoulder and talks to it. The magpie answers that he is an enchanted prince. The man asks what he can do to help him, and the magpie replies that if he can marry one of the man's daughters, his enchantment can be broken. The gentleman takes the magpie with him to his house and talks to his three daughters. The elder two refuse to entertain the magpie, but the youngest, named Una, decides to help the bird. After the man and the elder daughters leave, the girls spy on Una being courted by a handsome man instead of the bird. The sisters become jealous.

Una and the prince marry and depart to his castle. The elder sister decides to visit their new home, but the prince warns that his castle is filled with rare and beautiful things; if anyone were to covet them, he would revert to a magpie for another seven years. Some time later, Una's elder sister promises not to covet anything. During her visit, however, the elder sister mutters to herself she wants to have a certain golden plate of her brother-in-law's collection, and the prince turns back into a magpie. His wife, Una, asks the prince what she can do. The prince replies that she is to go to the mansion of the White Lady and work as a laundress, but she must not ask for money, and let her employer, the White Lady, place her wages in a drawer. The magpie also gives her a feather of his wing and teaches her a spell: "By the feather of his wing".

And so it happens: Una works for the White Lady, and uses the feather and the spell to do her chores, like washing heaps of dirty clothes, hanging them to dry, ironing and folding them. Una's employer is surprised at her work, but this arises suspicions among the other female servants. One night, a waitress goes to Una's room to share a bottle of wine with the newcomer, and Una pretends to drink and feigns sleep. The waitress asks where Una's source of magic lies, and she lies that it is in her red curls. Later, she creeps into Una's room to cut off her red curls (spurred by Una's sarcastic retort), but Una - pretending to be asleep - uses her husband's feather and commands the waitress to do her chores all night; thus, she sets every table for the whole night and well into the morning, to the other servants' amusement. Una then dispels the command.

Next, a lady gardener tries her luck and brings a bottle of wine to share with Una, so that she reveals her secrets. Again, the girl pretends to drink and lies that her magic is in a ribbon tied around her wrist. Later at night, the lady gardener enters the room with a pair of scissors to cut Una's ribbon on her wrist, and the girl uses the feather and the magic spell to force the other to tend to the garden the whole night: raking, digging, and planting flowers and seeds, until the morning. After the other servants find the gardener in this state, Una dismisses the command.

Lastly, a lady coachman goes to extract the truth from Una with another bottle of wine, and is answered the powers lie in Una's left earring. Thus, the women enters Una's room, but the girl forces the coachman to do her job: she goes to the stables and harnesses the horses, then takes the White Lady from her bed, places her in a carriage, and both gallop round the house, awakening everyone in the house, until the morning, when Una dispels the command.

After humiliating the servants, the White Lady is furious with Una, but does not know how to deal with her. When Una's seven years' time is almost up, the White Lady gathers all of her servants and orders them to arm themselves with sticks and prepare to beat Una as soon as she leaves the house. As for Una, she prepares to leave the mansion, since she saw her husband arriving in a coach, but the White Lady and her servants approach her. Una uses the magic command to have the White Lady and the servants beat themselves up. Una's husband, the prince, appears to her and kisses her, then says the people have been punished enough. With this, Una recants the spell and releases everyone. The prince takes Una back to their castle, explaining the White Lady was the one that cursed him in the first place, but now he is free at last.

== Analysis ==
=== Tale type ===
The tale belongs to the cycle of the Animal as Bridegroom, of the international Aarne-Thompson Index, as subtype AaTh 425N, "Bird Husband": after losing her husband, the heroine finds work somewhere else and has to avoid the romantic advances of unwanted suitors. According to Christine Goldberg, the heroine enchants the servants to be kept busy with some other task for the whole night.

In his monograph about Cupid and Psyche, Swedish scholar Jan-Öjvind Swahn proposed that subtype 425N derived from a type he designated as 425A, that is, "Cupid and Psyche", which contains the episode of the witch's tasks. (Note: In Stith Thompson's system, Swahn's type 425A is indexed as type AaTh 425B.)

However, after 2004, German folklorist Hans-Jörg Uther updated the international catalogue and subsumed type AaTh 425N under the more general type ATU 425B, "The Son of the Witch".

=== Motifs ===
The crow is the supernatural husband's form in Northern European variants, but in all of them the heroine receives a magical token from her husband: either a feather from the bird husband, or a ring. According to Swahn, the husband's token (feather or ring) is what allows the heroine to humiliate her unwanted suitors (akin to some variants of tale type ATU 313, "The Magic Flight"), and the feather as the token appears in German, English and Irish variants. Similarly, French scholars Paul Delarue and Marie-Louise Thénèze described that subtype N is characterized by the motif of the tricked three youths - also found in type ATU 313.

== Variants ==
=== Distribution ===
According to scholar Christine Goldberg, Swahn reported 17 variants of subtype 425N across Europe, in Ireland, Britain, Germany, Italy, Spain and France. Swahn calls type 425N "West European", with a limited distribution area.

=== Ireland ===
==== The Enchanted King and Queen ====
In an Irish tale collected by Pádraig Ó Tuathail from County Carlow and County Wicklow with the title The Enchanted King and Queen, a prince becomes bewitched to be a crow for seven years. When he flies in crow form, he sights a royal couple and their horses bogged in the mud. The crow-prince offers to help, in exchange for the royal couple's daughter. The royal parents agree and the crow helps them. The princess, named Nancy, meets her crow fiancé, who turns into a handsome man. He asks her which form she prefers him to be; she answers that she wants him as a man by night. And so they marry and move out to a palace of their own. One day, the crow prince warns her to protect a cask of gold and not give it to a witch that will come after it, no matter the cost. This it happens: a witch appears and demands the cask, but the princess refuses to give it. The witch comes back the next day and fails again. On the third day, she appears with two teeth and two walking sticks, captures the princess and steals the cask of gold, to the crow prince's misfortune. Nancy cries over the broken promise, but the crow prince has a plan: he advises her to seek employment with the old witch, gives her three feathers of his tail and teaches her a spell to fulfill every wish she may have ("By the bark of my three crow's feathers"). Nancy goes to the old witch's house and offers her services as a maid. She washes and dries the clothes, feeds the horses - all with the magic command her husband taught her. At the end of the afternoon, a servant lad wishes to stay with Nancy all night, but the asks him a favor: for him to close the duck-house door for her. The servant lad goes and Nancy chants the magical spell to have the lad lock the duck-house door all night. The next day, Nancy uses the magical spell on another servant: this time, he stays up all night just raking and raking the fire. The third time, she commands a third servant lad to lock the fowl-house door all night, for fire to come out of his mouth and for him to go round the yard like a devil. Some time later, fed up with the humiliation, the three servants lad prepare a trap for Nancy in the woods, but she learns of this and uses the magical command to compel the trio to beat one another. The old witch appears to see the commotion and Nancy alters the command and compels the lads to strike the witch. The hag begs for Nancy to save her, and the princess agrees, so long as she returns the cask of gold to her. Nancy gets the casket and dispels the command, then goes back to the magpie husband, who has become human for good. Ó Tuathail classified the tale as type AaTh 425.

==== The Black Crow ====
In an Irish tale collected from teller Sean O'Conaill, from Iveragh, with the title An Préachán Dubh and translated as The Black Crow, a girl named Máire lives with her blind father. One day, he is riding a horse when the man reaches a cliff, but a mysterious voice stops him and strikes a deal: the voice will restore his sight in exchange for Máire's hand. The man says she has to make the decision herself, but the voice says it will accompany the man to see wil she will accept. Máire's father regains his sight and sees a black crow nearby. The man and the bird go home together and Máire welcomes her father, who explains to her the deal he made with the crow. Máire understands the situation and agrees. Later that night, Máire and the black crow retire to their bedroom and sleep. One of her father's servants goes to make their bed and finds "the finest youth" beside Máire. Máire does not suspect anything. The next day, the crow appears next to her, but at night, it is the youth again. The maidservant informs Máire about the youth lying in bed with her at night. Máire decides to see it for herself, but falls asleep on the second night. On the third night, Máire pretends to be asleep and finds the youth next to her, and a black cloak hanging nearby. She takes the cloak and rushes to burn it, the youth behind her. After she burns the crow cloak, the youth says he is a bewitched prince and just had to sleep with her on their bed for three nights, and he would regain human form, but now he will turn into a porpoise for seven years. The youth leaves Máire's house and travels afar, the girl trailing behind him, until he stops by the seashore, where he indicates the place he will suffer the next part of his curse. He also points Máire to a nearby house where the girl can find work, and gives her a ring that can grant her everything she asks of it. Máire enters the house and is taken in as a servant, then is given clothes and a bloodied shirt. Máire takes the clothes to the river and touches the shirt with the ring, which removes the blood. Later, the young king who lives in the house marries another girl, and Máire is ordered to set the tables. However, the girl cannot be found anywhere in the house, so they look outside: she is combing the hair on her detached head. The servants gossip about it and the young king's bride boasts she used to do it back home; she cuts off her head to demonstrate it, but dies. The next night, the young marries a second bride and Máire is to set the tables, but a messenger finds her winding a skein of yard on a bull's horse, said bull no one has dared approach in a hundred years. The messenger returns to the house and tells the servants about it; the second bride learns of Máire's incredible feat and boasts she herself used to do the same back home. The second bride then approaches the ferocious bull and the animal places her horns under her and lifts her to the West Indies, never to return. Later, the young king marries another woman, and Máire once again neglects the tables. A messenger finds her working on a spinning wheel on a stalk overlooking a cliff. A third messenger reports the sight back at the house and the third bride insists she used to do the same back home, then goes to Máire's location. After Máire leaves the chair on the stalk, the third bride walks on the stalk, but falls off the cliff and dies. After losing three brides in three occasions, the young king decides to get rid of the newcomer Máire and bribes Mici, the swineherd, to spend a night with her, so the young king can find them together and denounce her to the king. Mici meets Máire and offers her money to spend the night with her. Before anything happens between them, Máire asks Mici to check out the night outside and close the window. However, antlers sprout on his head and he is stuck by window the whole cold night. The prince asks Máire to release Mici from that position. Next, the prince sends the butler to Máire's room, and she asks him to lift her prayerbook from the grate to keep it from burning, but his hands are firmly stuck to the book and he spends the night in this position. The prince asks Máire to release the butler, and the next night gives her some money to spend the night with her. Máire takes the payment, but asks to have a drink with the prince. She prepares some punch for her and the prince and drops a ring in the prince's tumbler. The prince finds the ring and looks at it, then admits to Máire they are married already, and he congratulates her for keeping his ring. Thus, they live happily together.

==== The Magpie's Wife ====
In an Irish tale collected from an informant named Joe Duffy in the late-1930s, from Corgerry Eighter, County Galway, with the title The Magpie's Wife, a gentleman has three daughters. One day, a magpie appears as asks the man for one of his daughters in marriage. The man's elder two daughters refuse the magpie's proposal, save for the youngest. The magpie marries the girl and takes her to a large house, accompanied by one of the girl's sisters, and gives his bride a set of keys. She can open every door in the castle, save for one. The girl and her sister enter the room and suddenly they are in the middle of a green field, sat on rock. The magpie appears to them and gives his wife three feathers, each feather containing three wishes for her to wish for anything. The birds sends her to another town for work, and she is hired by a lady from a house. One day, the lady's male servants are shaking mats when the magpie's wife uses the feather's powers to force everyone to beat each other. The girl brings her lady employer to the fight, and the girl wishes for one of the male servants to hit the lady and kill her. It happens thus, and the magpie and his wife move out to the lady's house.

==== Other tales ====
In an untitled Irish tale published by Irish author Lady Gregory, a king and queen's daughter is asked by a jackdaw if she would marry him after a year and a day. She denies him at first, but agrees the second time. Some time later, a carriage comes to take the princess to the jackdaw's castle, where she is instructed not to utter a word, lest she loses him forever. Suddenly, people come to beat the jackdaw to a pulp, which frightens the princess so much she utters a loud, pitiful lament for him. The jackdaw laments that the princess could stay silent and must leave her forever, but gives her a ring that can grant her every wish. After the jackdaw vanishes, the princess finds herself in darkness and commands the ring to open up a hole for her to escape. She sights a ship in the distance, and wishes the ring to appear on the ship, where she also wishes for food and drinks to appear before her. The ship docks in foreign lands, and the princess finds work with a local lord as a seamstress. One day, she is ordered to sew a dress for the gentleman's daughter, and she commands the ring to provide her with a dress. Later, the princess makes a swing in the garden and plays on it. The gentleman's daughter comes to the garden and wants to play on the swing, despite the princess's warnings. The gentleman's daughter plays on the swing, but falls from it and dies. The princess is brought to court, but, in her defense, explains she gave two warnings to the girl. Irish folklorist Séamus Ó Duilearga listed the tale as a variant of type 425.

== See also ==
- The Crow (fairy tale)
- María, manos blancas
- The Master Maid
- The Story of Princess Zeineb and King Leopard
- The Brown Bear of Norway
- The Man Who Came Out Only at Night
