= Animal as Bridegroom =

Typology of Beauty and the Beast

In folkloristics, "The Animal as Bridegroom" refers to a group of folk and fairy tales about a human woman marrying or being betrothed to an animal. The animal is revealed to be a human prince in disguise or under a curse. Most of these tales are grouped in the international system of Aarne-Thompson-Uther Index under type ATU 425, "The Search for the Lost Husband". Some subtypes exist in the international classification as independent stories, but they sometimes do not adhere to a fixed typing.

== Overview ==
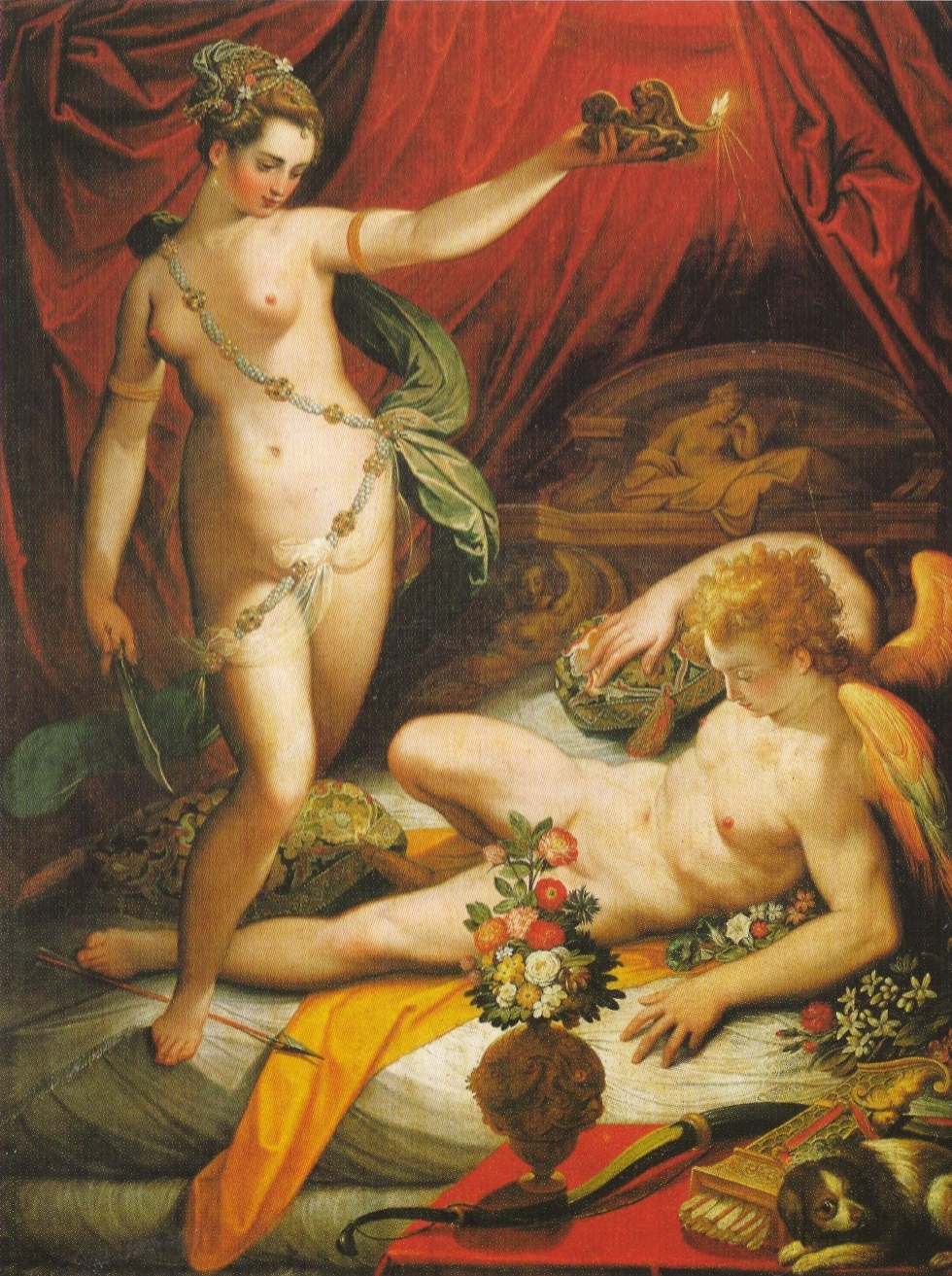
Amor and Psyche (1589) by Jacopo Zucchi.

As consequence of the surge in folktale collecting and the beginnings of folkloristics as a discipline in the 19th century, scholars and folktale collectors compared many versions of "The Animal as Bridegroom" to the tale of Cupid and Psyche.

Folklore scholar Stith Thompson clarified that the animal bridegroom may have been born due to its parents' wishes, or alternates between human and animal shapes. Some tales have the animal son court a princess, but her father demands a brideprice for her.

In some versions, the father surrenders his daughter as his ransom. In others, it is the mother who delivers or promises her daughter(s) to the monster, and it is also by the mother's insistence that the heroine breaks the taboo on her husband: the human heroine must not see him at night, or she must not reveal his true nature to her relatives.

The heroine may also ask her father a gift after his return from a journey, a motif that "frequently" appears as an opening to other Animal as Bridegroom tales.

=== Interpretations ===
The theme invites all sorts of scholarly and literary interpretations.

Scholar Jack Zipes describes these tale types as a mate selection wherein the human maiden is forced to marry an animal bridegroom as per the insistence of her family or due to her fate. In another work, Zipes writes that, in these tales, the supernatural husband (in animal form) goes through a process of civilizing himself, whereas to the human spouse it represents an initiatory journey.

Researcher Barbara Fass Leavy cited that these tales are interpreted under a feminist reading, which "applauds" the will of the main heroine, in contrast to passive heroines like Snow White and Sleeping Beauty. Leavy, as well as scholar Wendy Doniger, also stated that the "Animal Bridegroom" is the male counterpart of the "Swan Maiden" - both types referring to a marriage between a human person and a mythical being.

Richard MacGillivray Dawkins suggested that its endurance as a myth and a folktale was due to the story "reflect[ing] ... much of the relations of man and wife."

To Donald Ward, type 425 is, on the one hand, an erotic story, the union between divine male sexuality and mortal female virginity, but, on the other hand, also a tale of "love, devotion, and willingness to sacrifice". (Note: In that regard, in her study, Danish scholar Inger Margrethe Boberg concluded that the supernatural husband was a deity with human form in "the original tale", who falls in love with a mortal woman, and supposed that his animal shape was a later development.) Similarly, Wendy Doniger sees, in this cycle of tales, a contrast or a "tension" between "the human and the superhuman" (since the animal bridegroom may possess great powers), and between "the animal and the divine".

James M. Taggart stated that these tales underlie a "metaphorical [...] gender division of labor in courtship and marriage": while men take the active role in courtship, and women assume a more passive role, the latter are slotted into a role with "more responsibility" in maintaining the marital status (represented by the trials and ordeals they suffer in these tales).

In her book Off With Their Heads! Fairy Tales and the Culture of Childhood, in the chapter about animal husbands and the human women who marry them, scholar Maria Tatar concludes that the heroine of these tales is part of a complex set of actions and emotions. For instance, Tatar interprets the episode of Psyche's betrayal of Cupid identity (and, by extension, all other heroines and their animal husbands) as a contrast between the heroine's seeking greater intimacy and knowledge of her husband, and her existent attachments to her family - which causes the separation episode.

A line of scholarship (e.g., Charles Fillingham Coxwell, Boria Sax, James Frazer, Viera Gašparíková) associates human-animal marriages to ancient totem ancestry.

Another line of scholarship describes these tales as an initiatory journey for both parties: the husband becomes an animal or wears an animal skin as part of his marriage initiation, while the human wife burns his animal skin and begins her own quest to find her husband as part of hers.

== ATU tale types ==
Note: the following sections are based on the descriptions of the international Aarne-Thompson-Uther Index. Some information may differ in regional and national folktale indexes.

=== ATU 425: The Search for the Lost Husband ===
Folklorist D. L. Ashliman associated this general type with stories wherein the heroine crafts an artificial husband out of raw materials, who becomes a real man and a foreign queen falls in love with him. However, he noted that, among the tales he listed under this classification, some may also fall under type 425A, "Animal as Bridegroom". Folklorist Christine Goldberg named this narrative The Artificial Husband. She also took notice that the heroine, in the "Artificial Husband" tales, is the more active part and initiates the action, unlike the heroines of the other subtypes.

- Pintosmalto
- Master Semolina
- Fairer-than-a-Fairy
- The Ram (fairy tale)
- Prince Swan

=== ATU 425A: The Animal (Monster) as Bridegroom ===
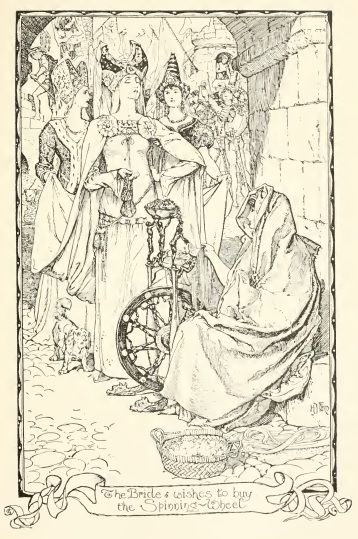
The princess (false bride) offers money to buy the golden spinning-wheel. Artwork by Henry Justice Ford for The Grey Fairy Book (1900).

In folktales classified as tale type ATU 425A, "The Animal as Bridegroom", the maiden breaks a taboo or burns the husband's animal skin and, to atone, she must wear down a numbered pair of metal shoes. On her way to her husband, she asks for the help of the Sun, the Moon and the Wind, a sequence that appears in Northern Europe, Germany, Portugal, in the Slavonic languages and in the Balkans. In other European tales, the heroine's helpers may be three old crones, or her husband's relatives.

During her journey, the heroine is given three nuts (alternatively, almonds and chestnuts) that contain objects inside, objects that are related to weaving (such as a loom or a spindle), or beautiful dresses representing the Sun, the Moon and stars, or the sea, the land and the skies.

At the end of her journey, the heroine finds her husband at the mercy of a second wife. She bribes the false bride with items she acquired on the way (given by the personifications of the elements, or from her helpers) to spend a night with him, or breaks the nuts which contain gifts. Only on the third night the heroine manages to talk to her husband and he recognizes her.

In Celtic and Germanic variants of the subtype, before the separation from her husband, the heroine's children are taken from her and hidden elsewhere. Another recurring motif of the subtype involves the heroine washing three drops of her husband's blood that fell on his clothes - a motif that is located in French variants from Brittany.

According to Hans-Jörg Uther, the main feature of tale type ATU 425A is "bribing the false bride for three nights with the husband". (Note: On a related note, Stith Thompson commented that the episode of the heroine bribing the false bride for three nights with her husband occurs in variants of types ATU 425 and ATU 408.) (Note: A similar assessment was made by scholar Andreas John: "The episode of 'buying three nights' in order to recover a spouse is more commonly developed in tales about female heroines who search for their husbands (AT 425, 430, and 432) ...") In fact, when he developed his revision of Aarne-Thompson's system, Uther remarked that an "essential" trait of the tale type ATU 425A was the "wife's quest and gifts" and "nights bought".

- About the astonishing husband Hora
- Again, The Snake Bridegroom
- The Calf's Skin (ATU 440 and ATU 425A)
- Enchanted Balaur
- The Enchanted Pig (ATU 441 and ATU 425A)
- The Enchanted Prince Who was a Hedgehog (ATU 441 and ATU 425A)
- The Lizard With the Seven Skins (ATU 433B and ATU 425A)
- Black Bull of Norroway
- The Brown Bear of Norway
- The Daughter of the Skies
- East of the Sun and West of the Moon
- The Enchanted Snake
- The Frog Queen (ATU 440 and ATU 425A)
- King Crin (Italian fairy tale)
- Prince Crawfish
- Prince Hat under the Ground
- Prince Whitebear
- The Iron Stove
- The Serpent Prince
- Sigurd, the King's Son (Icelandic fairy tale)
- The Sprig of Rosemary
- The Story of King Pig
- The Tale of the Hoodie
- The Tale of the Little Dog
- The Three Daughters of King O'Hara
- Trandafiru
- White-Bear-King-Valemon
- Whitebear Whittington
- The White Hound of the Mountain
- The White Wolf

=== ATU 425B: Son of the Witch (The Witch's Tasks) ===
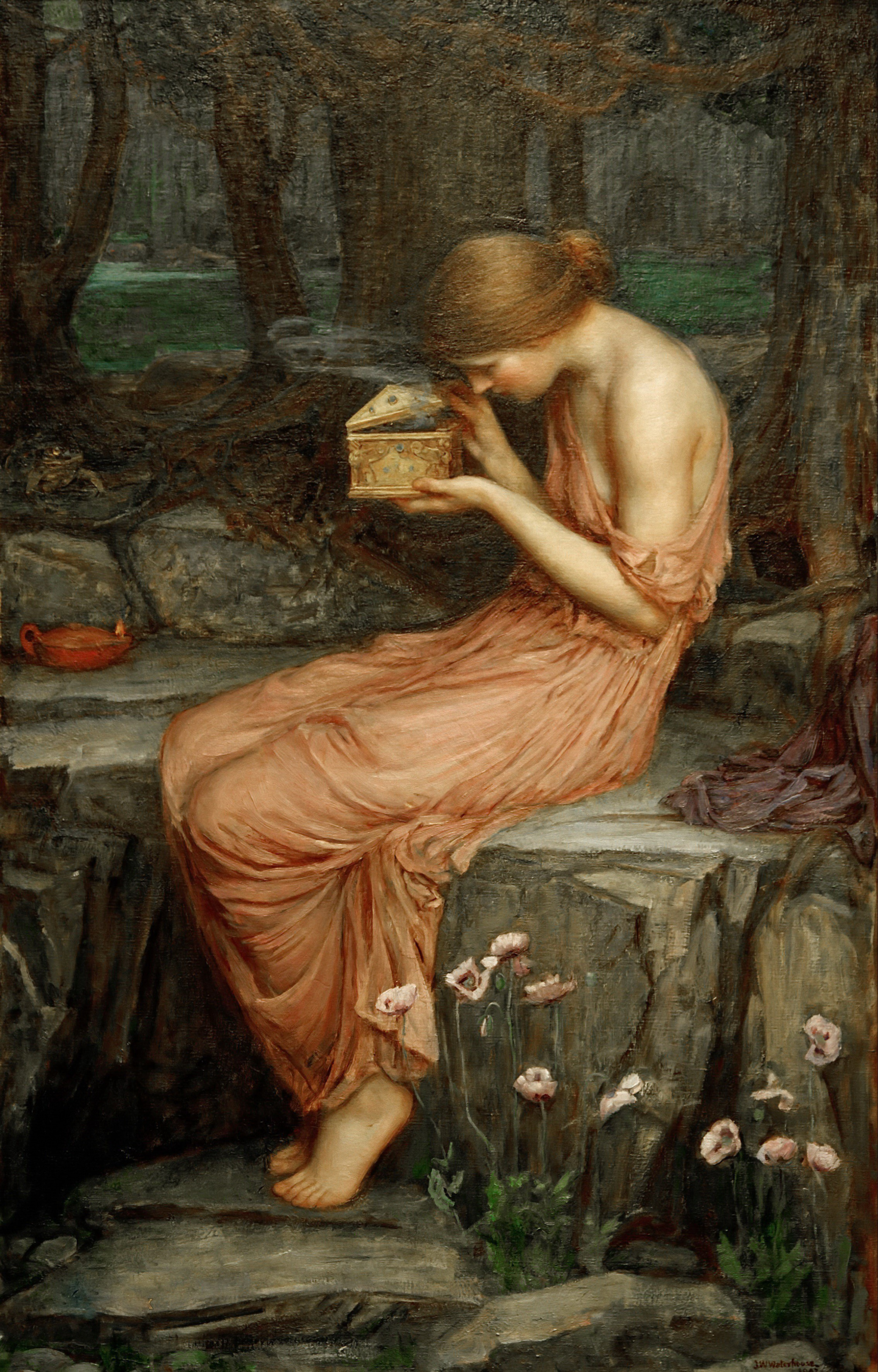
Psyche Opening the Golden Box (1903) by John William Waterhouse.

This category of tales involves the heroine performing difficult tasks for her husband's family (more specifically, her mother-in-law). In this type, the heroine reaches the house of a witch (sometimes, her mother-in-law; sometimes, another female relative of her husband), where she works as her servant. One of the tasks is to go to another witch's house (identified as a female relative of the first one), and fetch from there a box, a casket, a bag, a sack of something that her husband warns not to open, but she does.

Richard MacGillivray Dawkins also noted that, in some tales, the mother-in-law, to further humiliate the heroine, betrothes her son to another bride and sends her on errands to get materials for the upcoming wedding. Jack Zipes emphasizes that the heroine must perform the tasks before she has a chance to free her husband.

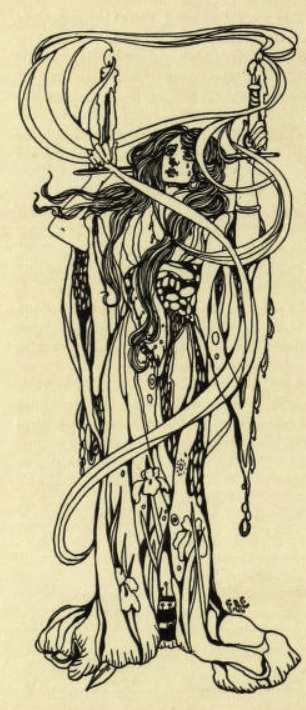
The princess holds the candles at the wedding between her husband, Prince Wolf, and the witch's daughter. Illustration for Prince Wolf from a 1909 book.

In some tales, the heroine is forced to carry torches to her husband's marriage cortège - a practice that Zipes and Ernst Tegethoff relate to an ancient Roman custom mentioned by Plautus in his work Casina. According to Donald Ward, Swedish scholar Jan-Öjvind Swahn stated that his type A, "the oldest" (see below), contains the motif of the heroine holding a torch to her husband's second marriage to the false bride - a trap set by the witch or her daughter with the intent to kill the heroine. However, she is saved when her husband takes the torch and drops it into the false bride's hands. Jan-Öjvind Swahn named this The Torch Motif and located it in tales from Scandinavia, Greece, India, Turkey, and Romance-speaking areas. Waldemar Liungman locates the candle or torch motif in West Asia, Iran, Italy, France, Denmark, Norway, and Sweden.

This type may be conflated with the previous one. However, Uther argues that the distinction between both categories lies in "the quest for the casket" and the visit to the second witch. Catalan scholarship locates the distribution of the latter motif in variants from Latvia, Finland, Germany, Iceland, France, Italy, Turkey, and Serbia.

As for the "quest for the casket", researcher Annamaria Zesi suggests that it occurs in Eastern Mediterranean variants. Similarly, Catalan scholarship located the motif of the box of musical instruments in Greek, Turkish and South Italian variants. In that regard, Swahn divided this motif in areas: in variants from Norway, Spain, Greece and Persia, the box contains something dangerous; in variants from Mediterranean tradition, the box contains instruments; in "Danish and Romance tradition", playing men leap out of the box (which he supposed was a variation on the motif of the instruments); in Scandinavia, it contains flying jewels.

According to Christine Goldberg and Walter Puchner, some variants of this type show as a closing episode "The Magic Flight" sequence, a combination that appears "sporadically in Europe", but "traditionally in Turkey". This episode also appears in the Bulgarian type 425B, "Момъкът с конската глава" or "Der Junge mit Pferdekopf" ("The Youth With the Horse's Head"), and in Iranian type AaTh 425B, Der Tierbräutigam: Die böse Zauberin ("The Animal Bridegroom: The Evil Sorceress").

A related tale type is type AaTh 428, "The Wolf", considered by scholars as a fragmentary version of the tale of Cupid and Psyche, lacking the initial part about the animal husband and corresponding to the part of the witch's tasks. Accordingly, Uther revised the international classification system and subsumed previous type AaTh 428, "The Wolf" under the new type ATU 425B, "Son of the Witch".

- Cupid and Psyche
- Graciosa and Percinet
- The Green Serpent
- The King of Love
- Ulv Kongesøn (Prince Wolf)
- The Golden Root
- The Horse-Devil and the Witch
- Tulisa, the Wood-Cutter's Daughter
- Khastakhumar and Bibinagar
- Habrmani
- The Son of the Ogress
- Yasmin and the Serpent Prince
- The Little Crab
- Pájaro Verde
- Los Tres Claveles (Spanish folktale)
- The Castle of Return and No Return
- Es Negret
- The Story of the Abandoned Princess
- Grünkappe
- The Snake-Prince Sleepy-Head
- Sabzqaba
- The Padisah's Youngest Daughter and Her Donkey-Skull Husband
- The Princess Who Could Not Keep a Secret
- The Tale of Aftab
- The King's Daughter and the Dragon
- The Spotted Deer
- The Stone of Patience
- Chötiktscha
- The Tale of the Woodcutter and his Daughters (ATU 425D and ATU 425B)
- Sea-Horse (Syrian folktale) (ATU 425D and ATU 425B)
- Prunella (AaTh 428)
- The Little Girl Sold with the Pears (AaTh 428)
- La Fada Morgana (AaTh 428)
- The Man and the Girl at the Underground Mansion (AaTh 428)
- The Tale About Baba-Yaga
- The Girl as Soldier

=== ATU 425C: Beauty and the Beast ===
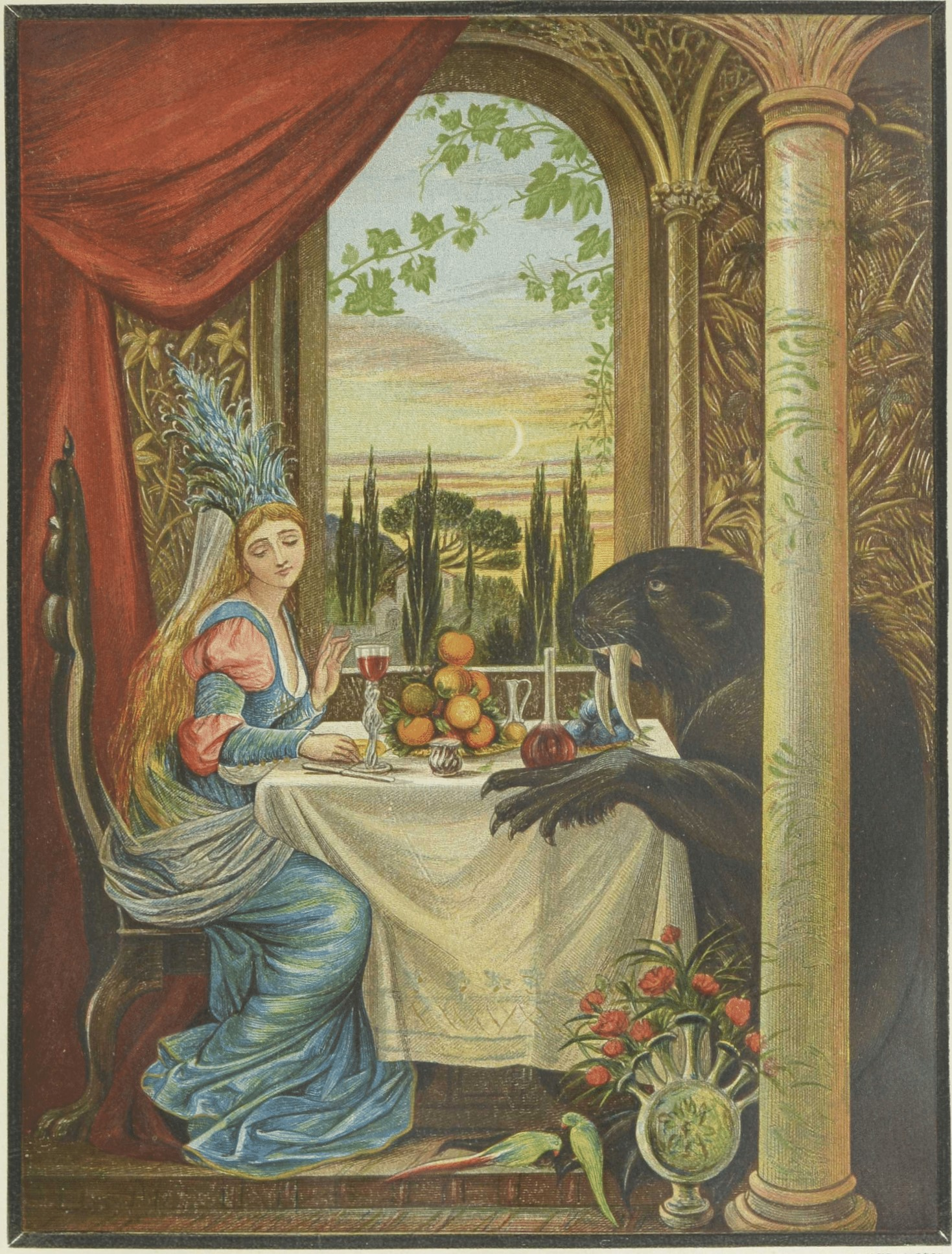
An 1875 illustration of Beauty and the Beast by Eleanor Vere Boyle

Zipes summarized the tale thus: the third or youngest daughter asks her father (a merchant or king) for a gift (bird or flower). The only place he can find such a trifle is the garden of the beast or monster, who demands the merchant/king's daughter in return. Richard MacGillivray Dawkins, in turn, remarked that the heroine's sisters asked their father for material possessions (e.g., dresses), whereas she asks for a simple token that will lead her to the enchanted prince.

Uther remarks that this type contains the "presents for the daughters", lacking, however, a quest for the lost spouse.

- Beauty and the Beast
- The Singing, Springing Lark (ATU 425C and ATU 425A)
- The Small-tooth Dog
- The Scarlet Flower

=== ATU 425D: The Vanished Husband ===
In this tale type, the husband disappears and the human wife builds an inn (alternatively, a hostel, bath house, or hospital) to receive strangers. Every guest must share a story with her. She then listens to a story told by the stranger and recognizes it is about where she can find her husband.

Greek scholars Anna Angelopoulou and Aigle Broskou remark that the breaking of the taboo by the wife in this tale type involves revealing the husband's identity during a party or a tournament. They also state that the motif of building an inn to help locate the missing spouse also happens in the 14th-century Byzantine romance of Libistros and Rodamni (or Livistros and Rhodamné).

- The Golden Crab
- The Donkey's Head
- The Donkey's Head (Turkish folktale)
- The Camel Husband
- Saint Passaway

=== ATU 425E: Enchanted Husband Sings Lullaby ===
In this tale type, the heroine is pregnant when her husband disappears and goes on a quest for him. She arrives at a castle, whose owner, a queen, lets her stay in. The heroine gives birth to her child. One night, someone comes in and sings a lullaby to the baby. The heroine recognizes this person as her husband, and his song contains instructions on how to save him (either from his animal curse or from the grasp of the fairies).

Croatian folklorist Maja Bošković-Stulli reported that, in one version of the Serbo-Croatian epic song titled The Falcon Groom, a princess is locked up in a tower by her father, intending to avoid a prophecy. A prince in falcon form enters the tower and falls in love with her. She becomes pregnant, leaves the tower and goes to the falcon groom's mother's castle to give birth to their son. When the falcon groom appears at night to rock his child, he sings a lullaby on how to disenchant him: by having a patriarch and twelve monks say prayers until the morning. Bošković-Stulli also noted that the song about the falcon-bridegroom was "related" to unpublished Dalmatian variants where the enchanted husband sings the lullaby to his child (subtype 425E).

- The Padlock
- The Story of Oimè
- Filek-Zelebi

=== Related types ===
Academic Thomas Frederick Crane noted another set of tales which he called "The Animal Children": sometimes, the inhuman/animal suitor is born out of a hasty wish of their parents, or adopted by a human couple in their current beastly form. When the animal suitor grows up, he wishes for his parents to find a woman of marriageable age. In some variants, the animal groom is given a different bride or marries other women before the heroine, and he devours, hurts or kills these brides while still in animal form. (Note: Barbara Leavy interprets this event as a "brutal defloration" of these women.) It is only the third wife that burns the animal skin and disenchants him.

This narrative may appear in the following tale types:

- ATU 430, "Donkey as Bridegroom" (prince as a donkey)
- ATU 433B, "King Lindworm" (prince as a lindworm)
- ATU 441, "In Enchanted Skin" or "Hans My Hedgehog" (prince as pig or hedgehog)

=== Other tale types ===
- The Sleeping Prince (fairy tale) (AaTh 425G)
- Eglė the Queen of Serpents (ATU 425M)
- The Lake Beetle as Groom (ATU 425M)
- The Story of Princess Zeineb and King Leopard (AaTh 425N)
- María, manos blancas (AaTh 425N)
- Feather O' My Wing (AaTh 425N)
- The Man Who Came Out Only at Night (AaTh 425N)
- Snow-White and Rose-Red (ATU 426)
- The Hut in the Forest (ATU 431)
- Prince as Bird (ATU 432)
- The Girl with Two Husbands (ATU 433B)
- The Dragon-Prince and the Stepmother (ATU 433B)
- The Stepdaughter and the Black Serpent (ATU 433B)
- Dragon-Child and Sun-Child (ATU 433B)
- Mimikakliu (Albanian folktale) (ATU 433B)
- The Fisherman's Daughter (ATU 433B)
- The Serpent Prince, or the Woman with Two Husbands (ATU 433B)
- Muchie-Lal (ATU 433B)
- Champavati (AaTh 433C)
- The Story of the Hamadryad (AaTh 433C)
- The Origin of the Sirenia (AaTh 433C)
- Cola Pesce (ATU 434*)
- The Dead Prince and the Talking Doll (AaTh 437)
- Kajalrekha (AaTh 437)
- The Frog Prince (ATU 440)
- The Well of the World's End (ATU 440)
- The Tale of the Queen Who Sought a Drink From a Certain Well (ATU 440)
- The Hedgehog, the Merchant, the King and the Poor Man (ATU 441 and ATU 707)
- The Old Woman in the Wood (ATU 442)
- Sidi Numan (ATU 449)

=== Other tales ===
- The Crow (fairy tale)
- Princess Himal and Nagaray
- The Snake Prince
- The Turtle Prince
- The Fisher-Girl and the Crab
- The Ruby Prince (Punjabi folktale)
- Prince Lal Maluk
- The Story of Hira and Lal
- The Story of Halahal Kumar
- Monyohe (Sotho)
- Umamba (Zulu folktale)
- Baemsillang (The Serpent Husband)
- Amewakahiko soshi
- The Pretty Little Calf
- The King of the Snakes
- Princess Baleng and the Snake King
- The Younger Sister Marries the Snake
- The Snail Son
- The White Bird and His Wife
- The Girl Langa Langchung and the Rooster
- Fairer-than-a-Fairy (Caumont de La Force)
- Tezin Nan Dlo
- King Iguana (Indonesian folktale)

== Distribution ==
According to Karen Bamford, more than 1,500 variants of the tale have been collected from Europe, Asia, Africa and North America (in the latter, derived from European traditions). Israeli professor Dov Noy reported 580 variants across six European countries: Sweden, Norway, Ireland, Germany, France and Italy. Similarly, according to Hasan M. El-Shamy, type 425, The Search for the Lost Husband, is "very popular" in the Arab world, with variants found in the Levant (in Palestine, Lebanon, Syria, and Jordania), Egypt, and North Africa (Morocco, Algeria, Tunisia and Libya).

=== Possible developments ===
According to his monograph, Jan-Öjvind Swahn considered Cupid and Psyche as the "oldest" and the main tale type, which he classified as type 425A. (Note: For clarification, in Stith Thompson's system, Swahn's typing is indexed as type AaTh 425B.) (Note: French scholars Paul Delarue and Marie-Louise Thèneze, establishers of the French folktale catalogue, also follow Swahn's classification: French type 425A follows Cupid and Psyche with the tasks; type 425B is the one with the gifts and the three nights.) (Note: Greek folktale scholars Georgios A. Megas, Anna Angelopoulou and Aigle Brouskou follow Swahn and treat subtype A as "Cupid and Psyche".) Swahn hypothesized that the original tale of Cupid and Psyche might have developed in the Eastern Mediterranean, an area that encapsulates Southern Italy, Sicily, Greece and Turkey. (Note: In this regard, researcher Marina Mattei regards Apuleius's narrative as a "composition", a "formulation" and argues that it works themes that were "known and addressed" in the literature of nearby regions, "especially Egypt, the East and the Near East".) According to Swahn, this narrative is "commonest in Scandinavia and eastern Mediterranean", but also appears in Europe, Asia Minor, Persia, India, Indonesia (Note: A similar story is attested in Khmer/Cambodian literature, with the tale of Reach Kol: the son of a celestial king, Reach Kol descends to Earth with an equine disguise. He marries Princess Pu, third and youngest daughter of an earthly king. Princess Pu discovers he is a handsome youth under the horseskin. One day, he has to return to his heavenly abode and his human wife goes after him.) (Note: Professor Damiana Eugenio located a Philippine metrical romance with the theme of the animal bridegroom, the wife's betrayal and the subsequent quest.) and in Africa ("among the Berbers and Hausa" (Note: The tale from the Hausa people is titled Das verwandelte Pferde ("The Enchanted Horse"): a man's daughter marries her faithful horse who, it turns out, is a man; later in the story the witch falls into a hole and dies. Swahn approximated this tale to his type A, "Cupid and Psyche".)). Greek folklorist Georgios Megas complements Swahn's analysis and locates type A across the Mediterranean. In the same vein, Waldemar Liungman and Renato Aprile find variants "that resemble Apulejus's account" in northern Europe (in Denmark and Scandinavia), in France and in Eastern Mediterranean (Italy, Sicily, Greece and among the Turks). Aprile, however, mentions that the tale is "rare in Central Europe" and Megas reports variants even in China.

In regards to the type of "buying three nights" (Swahn's type B), Swahn suggested that this sequence was an "innovation" on the main type (Cupid and Psyche), and "belongs to France", because it either developed among the Bretons or in France proper under influence of Breton motifs. From there it diffused to the whole of Europe and Asia Minor, appearing "particularly" in Ireland, Denmark and Norway. The type with the three nights, Swahn acknowledged, was the one to spread far and wide. Later scholarship corroborates Swahn's assessment: "Animal as Bridegroom" tales with the "buying three nights" episode are very popular in Germanic-, Celtic-, Slavic- and Romance-speaking areas.

About a small cycle of stories that involves the "three nights" and "the artificial husband", Swahn believed that it must have developed in Italy, since tales with the artificial husband seem restricted to Turkey, Italy and Greece. An opposite view is held by Greek folklorist Georgios A. Megas, to whom the two motifs have been merged in Greek tradition.

In regards to the diffusion of subtype 425C, "Beauty and the Beast", scholars like Swahn, Hans-Jörg Uther, Paul Delarue, Marie-Louise Thénèze, Gianfranco D'Aronco, have pointed that the oral versions derive from the French 18th century literary work La Belle et la Bête.

Greek folklorist Georgios A. Megas argued for a transmission of type 425D from the East to the West by the Crusaders, since the main feature of the subtype, the inn as means to locate the missing husband, already appears in Greek medieval literature. Fellow scholars Anna Angelopoulou and Aigle Broskou remark that tale type 425D is popular in both Greece and Turkey, and from the latter spread to Egypt, Iran and Tunisia. According to Megas, type 425D was spread "by the Turks" to the Jewish.

Megas also suggested that, since it appears in combination with other subtypes of type 425 and with type ATU 433B, tale type 425E did not originate in Greece, but was of Italian provenance, and possibly migrated from Italy to Greece and from there to Turkey. According to him, this would explain its presence in these three Mediterranean countries, and how the subtype appears in combination with subtype 425D as the Turkish type TTV 93, and with type 433B as the Turkish type TTV 106.

== Bibliography ==
- Aarne, Antti; Thompson, Stith. The types of the folktale: a classification and bibliography. Third Printing. Folklore Fellows Communications FFC no. 184. Helsinki: Academia Scientiarum Fennica, 1973 [1961]. pp. 140–151.
- Kagan, Zipporah (1969). "THE JEWISH VERSIONS OF AT 425: CUPID AND PSYCHE (On the problem of sub-types and oikotypes)". Laographia. 22: 209–212.
- Leavy, Barbara Fass (1994). "The Animal Groom". In Search of the Swan Maiden. NYU Press. pp. 101–155. ISBN 978-0-8147-5268-5. JSTOR j.ctt9qg995.7.
- Sautman, Francesca (1989). "Le Conte 425B: Rites de Mariage et Parcours". Merveilles & Contes. 3 (1): 28–44. JSTOR 41389989.
- Swahn, Jan Öjvind (1955). The Tale of Cupid and Psyche. Lund: C.W.K. Gleerup.
- Uther, Hans-Jörg; Fellows, Folklore (2004). FF Communications: The Types of International Folktales: A Classification and Bibliography, Based on the System of Antti Aarne and Stith Thompson. Suomalainen Tiedeakatemia, Folklore Fellows. pp. 247–265. ISBN 978-951-41-0963-8.
- "Choosing the Right Mate: Why Beasts and Frogs Make for Ideal Husbands". In: Zipes, Jack. The Enchanted Screen: The Unknown History of Fairy-Tale Films. London and New York: Routledge. 2011. pp. 224–251. ISBN 9780203927496.
