= The Story of Princess Zeineb and King Leopard =

Literary fairy tale from France

The Story of Princess Zeineb and King Leopard (French: Histoire de la Princesse Zeineb et du Roi Léopard) is a French language fairy tale published in the 18th century. The tale belongs to the international cycle of the Animal as Bridegroom as a subtype, with few variants reported across Europe. In it, the heroine is delivered to a cursed or enchanted prince, but breaks a taboo and loses him; later, she finds work elsewhere and wards off the unwanted advances of male suitors with the magical object her enchanted husband gave her.

== Sources ==
The tale was published by abbot and preacher Jean-Paul Bignon in the work Les Aventures d'Abdalla, fils d'Hanif, tome 2. The tale was translated into English as The History of Princess Zeineb and the King Leopard by Henry Weber, and as Princess Zeineb and King Leopard by Jack Zipes.

== Summary ==
Princess Zeineb narrates her tale in first person: she is the youngest of six daughters of King Batoche, who rules the eastern part of the Isle of Gilolo. One day, her father finds a palace in a part of the island. He enter, but a voice forbids him, threatening to kill him unless he delivers one of his daughters. The king returns to tell his daughters about the event, and they see a leopard with a ferocious glare in his eyes. That same day, the leopard appears at court; every daughter tries to gather some courage to offer herself to the leopard, but only Zeineb decides to bear the burden of her father's decision.

Zeineb goes to the leopard's palace and admires the extravagance. She is served by nymphs and the leopard is no animal, but shows great wisdom and respect for Zeineb. And so they live together in the palace. However, ten months into their domestic arrangement, Zeineb begins to suspect that the leopard may be more than he seems. One night, she notices that there is someone in bed with her, and the leopard skin is strewn about on the floor. Zeineb decides to tear the animal skin to pieces and goes back to bed.

Her mysterious bedmate wakes up the next day and despairs at the torn leopard fur. He reveals he is a king, enchanted by an evil magician. Zeineb tries to explain herself. The leopard begins to calm down and teaches her a magical spell to command people. Then, the princess notices that the palace and everything has disappeared. She finds some of her previous clothes, now in tatters, puts them on and decides to beg for food and work in the world. She meets a Mussulman trader who is travelling to Borneo, and embarks on his ship.

They reach Borneo and she disembarks. After walking to deeper parts of the island, the princess moves to the city of Soucad, where she decides to take up the job of seamstress. Her business thrives and she gains enough money to hire help and buy a larger studio. Due to her successes, three local men decide to try their luck in wooing her. The first of the would be seducers dines with Zeineb. The princess thinks of a ploy to get rid of him: she has a window in her apartment that the first suitor goes to shut, and the princess uses the magical command to glue him to the window until the morning. The man enters a trance and closes the window for the whole night, then returns to his mates and lies that he spent a happy evening with the princess, which convinces the other two to try their luck. However, the other wooers are subjected to the same humiliation by princess Zeineb: she magically orders him to wind a reel of silk for the whole night, and for the third, she forces him to comb her hair for whole night.

Their passion for the princess turns to hatred and they report her to a judge, a magician. Zeineb manages to delay her trial for three months by bribing local magistrates, but she is still sentenced to be burnt alive. She is walked to her execution and the executioner prepared to deal the fatal blow, when he stays still - Zeineb is the one who paralyzed the executioner with the magical spell. The three suitors seize the opportunity to their favour and incite the populace. Suddenly, a great sound of acclamation is heard in the mob: the king of Soucad, their monarch, has returned, and wished to surprise his people. He halts the execution and releases the princess. After some moments taking in the visage of her saviour, she recognizes that the king of Soucad is the Leopard.

The king of Soucad, the same leopard, marries Zeineb and tells her the whole story: he is the legitimate heir to the throne, but his brother conspired with a magician to turn him into an animal. A sage, however, mitigated the curse by establishing an escape clause: if a princess was willing to spend a whole year with him, the curse would be lifted.

== Analysis ==
=== Tale type ===
The tale has been compared to the Graeco-Roman myth of Cupid and Psyche, by Apuleius, and to "Beauty and the Beast", in that a human heroine marries a supernatural or animal husband and loses him, having to search for him. As such, it is classified, in the international Aarne-Thompson-Uther Index, as tale type ATU 425, "The Search for the Lost Husband".

French scholars Paul Delarue and Marie-Louise Ténèze, establishers of the French folktale catalogue, classified it as subtype 425N. In subtype AaTh 425N, "Bird Husband", after losing her husband, the heroine finds work somewhere else and has to avoid the romantic advances of unwanted suitors. According to Christine Goldberg, the heroine enchants the servants to be kept busy with some other task for the whole night.

In his monograph about Cupid and Psyche, Swedish scholar Jan-Öjvind Swahn proposed that subtype 425N derived from a type he designated as 425A, that is, "Cupid and Psyche", which contains the episode of the witch's tasks. (Note: In Stith Thompson's system, Swahn's type 425A is indexed as type AaTh 425B.)

However, after 2004, German folklorist Hans-Jörg Uther updated the international catalogue and subsumed type AaTh 425N under the more general type ATU 425B, "The Son of the Witch".

=== Motifs ===
The crow is the supernatural husband's form in Northern European variants, but in all of them the heroine receives a magical token from her husband: either a feather from the bird husband, or a ring. According to Swahn, the husband's token (feather or ring) is what allows the heroine to humiliate her unwanted suitors (akin to some variants of tale type ATU 313, "The Magic Flight"), and the feather as the token appears in German, English and Irish variants. Similarly, Delarue and Thénèze described that subtype N is characterized by the motif of the tricked three youths - also found in type ATU 313.

== Variants ==
According to scholar Christine Goldberg, Swahn reported 17 variants of subtype 425N across Europe, in Ireland, Britain, Germany, Italy, Spain and France.

=== Europe ===
==== France ====
In a French tale from Ille-et-Vilaine with the title Le crapaud qui se marie ("The Frog that Married"), there is a man so old moss has grown on his legs. HIs three daughters work elsewhere to provide for their family. One day, just like every morning, his youngest daughter, Lida, takes his to rest on a bench under an apple tree in their yard. This time, while Lida is away, the old man hears a rustle in the foliage and a frog jumps out of the leaves with a promise to restore the man's youth in exchange for marrying one of the man's daughter, but the answer must be given in three days time. The frog enters the foliage again, and Lida reappears to take her father home. Back home, the man is deep in thought, and Lida notices this. The old man then reveals the frog's proposition to his family: the elder two refuse to marry the frog, but Lida agrees, for her father's happiness. The old man returns to the frog to tell the animal his cadette accepted his proposal. The frog does a leap in happiness and tells the man to bring Lida the next day. The following morning, the old man takes Lida to the frog and the amphibian, just as promised, uses a magic wand to restore the man's youth and vigour, and takes his human wife to a rock he opens with the wand. Lida faints with the lack of light, and the frog's servants (little toads) take her to a mossy bed and nudge her awake. Lida and the frog celebrate their wedding, but the amphibian notices she is withering with the lack of sunshine and open air. Thus, he allows her to visit her family for eight days, but warns her not to reveal the location of her home, nor to say she is unhappy there. Lida returns home and learns her sisters shared Lida's belongings among themselves, but Lida assures they can keep them, for she is only visiting. After eight days, Lida is aware she must return to the frog and their miserable life together, and sobs. Suddenly, the frog, who spied on her, appears and chastises her for not keeping her word. Still, out of respect for her father, the frog grants her freedom from their marriage and gives her his own magic wand she can use to wish for anything. The frog then vanishes. Lida and her sisters play together and, one day, walk towards a distant hill, where the elder two say out loud it is a nice place for a palace. Thus, Lida uses the frog's magic wand to create a large and splendid palace for them. Suddenly, they hear shouting coming from their backyard, and find three evil-looking men, who want to force their way into the palace. Lida valiantly denies them, and one man grabs an ax and tries to knock down the gate. Lida uses the wand's powers and utters a spell so that whoever tries to break into her palace breaks a member. It happens thus, and the ax-wielding man cuts off his own left hand. His mate gets the axe and brandishes it, but, due to the spell, accidentally cuts off his knees. The third man takes the axe, but it slips from his hands and cuts off his own head. Suddenly, the sound of horse hooves and a carriage are heard approaching the palace. After it stops, a handsome prince exits the carriage and tells Lida she defeated his enemy that cursed him into frog form for centuries. Lida recognizes her husband and goes to embrace him.

==== Germany ====
The Brothers Grimm, in their notes, mentioned a tale collected in Hanover. In this tale, a king hunts some game to cure his three ill daughters. He sights in the forest a raven and aims at it, but the raven strikes a deal with him: the bird shall find him some game, in exchange or one of the king's daughters to be given to the bird as wife. The raven fulfills his promise, and waits for the king to fulfill his. He cures his daughters and asks if one of them is willing to go to the raven. The youngest agrees and takes her waiting maid with her. The raven takes the princess and the waiting maid to a castle, where the princess spends her days. She has a mirror in her room, which she must not let the waiting maid peer into. She accidentally forgets to lock her room and her waiting maid looks into the mirror. The raven scolds her and tells she must go into service for seven years, perform the work of seven maids. The raven gives her one of its feathers and teaches her a spell ("By the raven's command, this shall be done"). The princess leaves the castle, trades clothes with an old woman, and finds work in a house. The mistress of the house forces her on the workload of seven maids. During the seven years, the male servants of the house, one by one, try to woo her, but she uses the raven's feather and spell to humiliate them, so she remains faithful to the raven for seven years.

Folklorist Franz Xaver von Schönwerth collected in the 19th century a Bavarian variant titled Der verwünschene Krähe ("The Enchanted Crow"), published in the 21st century with the title The Enchanted Quill. In this tale, a man falls from his horse and passes out in the middle of the forest. He wakes up and sees a crow pecking at his horse. The man inquires the bird about the meaning of his action, and the crow answers he is just awakening the man, who has been asleep for three years. The crow asks one of the man's three sisters as reward and gives a picture to the man to show the sisters. The elder two wrinkle their noses at the image, but the youngest agrees to marry the bird. The family is escorted in a golden carriage to a large palace and warned to get too curious and peek into what they should not. The youngest sister enters a room and talks to the crow. Her sisters peek through the keyhole and see a prince instead of the bird. The castle disappears and the crow says only the youngest can save him, but she must dress in rags and look for a job in a nearby town. The youngest sister follows the bird's orders and finds work as the servant to a prince, but her work is dismal. To help her, the bird asks her to pluck a father from his body and use it to fulfill any task. Her work improves and she draws the attention of three of the prince's servants (the caretaker, the huntsman and a "dove-watcher"), who each try to court her. With the crow's feather and a magic command, she humiliates each of them: the caretaker spends a whole evening opening and closing a door; the huntsman puts his boots on and takes them off all night, and the dove-watcher closes and opens the door to the dovecote all night.

In a German variant from Silesia with the title Die erlöste Schlange ("The redeemed snake"), published by German folklorist Will-Erich Peuckert, a woodcutter is told by a little gray man to give him his elder daughter to save him. The next day, a snake comes and takes the girl to its lair, then changes into the little gray man, and says the girl can help disenchant him if she keeps reading a book for seven days on end, without taking her eyes off the book. For six days, she manages to stay awake and the snake becomes a prince. On the seventh, however, the girl's sisters come for a visit, and distract her. The prince turns back into a snake, and tells the girl she needs to go out in the forest and find work in a beautiful castle. Then he gives her a feather that will help her. The girl goes to the castle and finds work. She uses the feather and a magical command to unload a cart of fertilizer. At the end of the tale, after working in the castle, the girl gets to marry the prince, who is no longer a snake.

==== England ====
In an English tale published by folklorist Joseph Jacobs with the title Three Feathers, a woman is married to a man whose face she has never seen. One night, while he is asleep by her side, the woman lights a torch and discovers her husband is a handsome man. The man turns into a bird, tells her she has to serve seven years and a day, gives her three feathers and teaches a spell for her to use ("By virtue of my three feathers"). The woman leaves her home and finds work in another house as a laundry-maid. The other male servants - the butler, the coachman, and the footman - begin to notice her and intend to court her. Their efforts to impress her fail, because the woman makes up some excuse so that the male servant can do a chivalrous deed for her: by the use of the feather and the spell, the footman is stuck trying to close the shutters that keep opening; the coachman tries to gather the woman's clothes from the cloth's hanger, and a wind blows them about all night; the coachman goes to the cellar to get some brandy for her, and the contents from the barrels keep spilling out. The master notices his servants are acting strangely after the laundry-woman has been hired, but his wife will have no bad word about her best servant. Later, the three humiliated men meet each other and talk about what they did all night. Their master appears in the hall and the girl uses the three feathers to force everyone to fight each other, and throw one another in the pond. The girl then dismisses the spell on the men, and continues to serve until the allotted time is over. The bird-husband appears to her, restored to human form, and rescues her from servitude to his castle.

=== Americas ===
==== Chile ====
In a Chilean tale collected by Chilean folklorist Yolando Pino Saavedra with the title Ramoncita, an old man lives with his three daughters Rosita, Juanita and Ramoncita. One day, the man passes by a swamp and a little frog asks the man to marry one of his daughters. The man goes back home and questions his daughters which shall marry the frog: the elder two refuse, but Ramoncita agrees and she marries the frog. When the old man goes out for a while, the frog tells Ramoncita he is to sleep by her side wrapped in a handkerchief, and he must be undisturbed until midnight for him to fully become a man. However, Juanita and Rosita enter her sister's room and mock her for sleeping with an animal on her bed. The frog wakes up and feels insulted that Ramoncita's sisters interrupted him, so the girl can only find him across the sea, so gives her a magic kerchief, and vanishes. Ramoncita decides to look for him and goes to the seashore, then uses the magic kerchief to open up a dry path for her until she reaches a city, where she rents a house from two old ladies. The ladies also find her a companion named Chinita. In the city, there are three priests, each of them pays a visit to Ramoncita and Chinita: the first priest compliments Ramoncita's guitar playing, and she uses the magic kerchief to have the priest play the guitar all night. The second priest comes and is served a glass of water, and Ramoncita uses the kerchief to have the second priest drink water all night. Lastly, the third priest comes and is served a cup of tea, who Ramoncita enchants to drink all night long. Some time later, the three priests take Ramoncita, Chinita and the old ladies to court, and are further humiliated by Ramoncita enchanting them to chase after the mules.

== See also ==
- Beauty and the Beast
- The Green Serpent
- Graciosa and Percinet
- The Crow (fairy tale)
- The Master Maid
- María, manos blancas
- Feather O' My Wing
- The Man Who Came Out Only at Night
