= María, manos blancas =

Spanish fairy tale from Extremadura

María, manos blancas is a Spanish fairy tale from Extremadura, collected by Spanish author Marciano Curiel Merchán. The tale belongs to the international cycle of the Animal as Bridegroom as a subtype, with few variants reported across Europe and in Spain. In it, the heroine is delivered to a cursed or enchanted prince, but breaks a taboo and loses him; later, she finds work elsewhere and wards off the unwanted advances of male suitors with the magical object her enchanted husband gave her.

== Summary ==
A humble baker has three beautiful daughters. The man chops wood for his trade and, one day, goes to chop wood in the forest, when he sights a broom bush which he tries to cut down. Suddenly, a black man appears before him and demands the baker brings one of his daughters the following day, lest he be killed. The baker returns home and explains the situation to his daughters: the elder, haughty and proud, refuses to marry a black man, and so does the middle one; only the youngest, named María, hardworking and fond of her father, agrees to marry the stranger to save him. The baker delivers María to the black man the following morning and leaves her there, then returns home. The black man falls in love with María and takes her to a nearby garden, which he asks her to water. When night falls, María goes to sleep, and senses someone coming to her bed at night. This goes on for a year, until María wishes to visit her family. The black man allows her a three-day visit and lends her a fine coach and coachman to take her home.

Back home, María spends three days there, when a female neighbour gives her a box of matches and a candle to better see her bedmate at night. The black man's coachman informs her it is time to return to the black man's house. At night, María goes to sleep and senses her companion come to bed; she lights up the candle and a drop of wax falls on the black man's body. The black man wakes up and admonishes her, saying he was nearing the end of his curse, but María ruined it; still, for her kindness, he gives her a ring that can grant everything she wishes by uttering a spell, and vanishes. María then finds herself alone in the forest, and cries.

The girl then wanders off until she finds a house of arrieros, who welcome them as their maidservant. The arrieros notice María's hands are "white" and delicate to be used in manual labour, but she insists she can do it. One of the arrieros takes her in and introduces her to his wife, tia Francisca, who also makes a remark on María's hands. María does her chores and, due to her beauty, draws the attention of the unmarried men in the village. One day, one of the youths decides to pay María a visit, and she sets a date at eight o'clock. The youth appears at the appointed time while María is sifting the flour, and he also comments that a girl with soft hands cannot do such a task. María then uses the ring the black man gave her and, uttering a spell, uses the ring's magic to force the youth to sift the flour for her.

The next day, another man attempts to woo her and appears by eight o'clock, like the one before him. This time, the second suitor finds María in the middle of shovelling some coals. The second youth also comments María's hands are too delicate for such a task; the girl uses the ring's magic to force the youth to shovel the coals for her, eventually releasing him by morning. The third time, a third suitor also tries his hand at courting her and finds María opening and closing a door. The third youth also makes a remark about her soft hands, and María uses the ring to force the third youth to open and close the same door for the whole night.

After these humiliating events, the three suitors, who are friends, meet one another and comment about their respective experiences with María. The three men suspect she may be a witch, and inform her female employer. The woman at first defends María's honour from such attacks, but the youths' arguments are strong enough she concedes and takes María to the public square so that she is trialed and burnt as a witch. A pyre is prepared for her and María is guided to her execution, but she remains calm all the while. The three youths, wanting to take revenge on María for their humiliation, fetch some stones and aim them at the girl. María, however, utters the ring's spell again so that everyone knocks one another down like rams and people cannot light up the pyre.

It happens thus and everyone is knocked down. María sights a familiar coach, the same that belonged to the black man. Out of the coach comes a handsome prince who greets María and explains she is no witch, but a virtuous woman who gave her life to save her father, and that he was the black man, enchanted into that form. After the explanations, María marries the prince in a grand wedding.

== Analysis ==
=== Tale type ===
The tale belongs to the cycle of the Animal as Bridegroom (tale type ATU 425). Spanish scholars Julio Camarena and Maxime Chevalier, in their joint Spanish Folktale Index, classified the tale as type AaTh 425N, La burla a los galanteadores ("Mocking the would-be suitors"). The Spanish type corresponds, in the international Aarne-Thompson Index, to tale type AaTh 425N, "Bird Husband": after losing her husband, the heroine finds work somewhere else and has to avoid the romantic advances of unwanted suitors. According to Christine Goldberg, the heroine enchants the servants to be kept busy with some other task for the whole night.

In his monograph about Cupid and Psyche, Swedish scholar Jan-Öjvind Swahn proposed that subtype 425N derived from a type he designated as 425A, that is, "Cupid and Psyche", which contains the episode of the witch's tasks. (Note: In Stith Thompson's system, Swahn's type 425A is indexed as type AaTh 425B.)

However, after 2004, German folklorist Hans-Jörg Uther updated the international catalogue and subsumed type AaTh 425N under the more general type ATU 425B, "The Son of the Witch".

=== Motifs ===
The crow is the supernatural husband's form in Northern European variants, but in all of them the heroine receives a magical token from her husband: either a feather from the bird husband, or a ring. According to Swahn, the husband's token (feather or ring) is what allows the heroine to humiliate her unwanted suitors (akin to some variants of tale type ATU 313, "The Magic Flight"), and the feather as the token appears in German, English and Irish variants. Similarly, French scholars Paul Delarue and Marie-Louise Thénèze described that subtype N is characterized by the motif of the tricked three youths - also found in type ATU 313.

== Variants ==
=== Distribution ===
According to scholar Christine Goldberg, Swahn reported 17 variants of subtype 425N across Europe, in Ireland, Britain, Germany, Italy, Spain and France. Swahn calls type 425N "West European", with a limited distribution area. In Catalan-speaking areas, the tale type AaTh 425N registers one variant in Catalonia and two in Mallorca.

=== Spain ===
In a Spanish tale collected by folklorist Aurelio Macedonio Espinosa Sr. with the title Las tres ascuitas, an old woman has three daughters and gathers herbs for their three hares. One day, she pulls a herb from the ground and a male voice complains the woman is pulling his hair. The male voice asks the woman to bring his elder daughter to him. She does, and the elder daughter lives in an enchanted palace with a mysterious husband she cannot see. One day, the little birds are singing, and the mysterious man tells his wife his sister is marrying and allows her to visit them, but she must return pronto. Later, the little birds are crying, which the man explains his wife's youngest sister is dying, and she is allowed to visit them. The girl goes back home and spends some time with her mother, who gives her a candle so she can see her husband at night. The girl returns home to the mysterious husband and, while he is asleep, she lights up the candle and sees his true face: a man with a medallion on his chest and a washerwoman washing some rags. She shouts for the washerwoman and the man awakes. He says he has been disenchanted, gives his wife three hot embers ('ascuitas') and a wand of virtue for her to use it whenever she needs, then vanishes. The girl suddenly appears with a palace in the middle of a city, and the people think she is evil. In the same city live three male friends who want to see who is living in the palace. The first one goes to the palace and asks if one can lunch there. The girl answers one can have lunch, have dinner and later sleep with her, which greatly satisfies him. However, as soon as the man prepares to sleep with her, the girl requests the man to fetch some water from the well, and, while he is at the well, she uses the magic wand of virtue and commands the man to pour water over himself for the whole night. The man goes home and his friend tries to seduce the girl, and again the girl uses the wand of virtue to have the man's nose be glued to the mirror the whole night. Finally, the third man tries to court the girl, and she uses the wand of virtue to have the man stuck to the door hinges for the whole night. After being humiliated, the three men report her to the authorities and some guards come to arrest her. The girl takes the ascuitas and her prince appears to her. He explains to the guards his wife is not an evil person, and marries her. Camarena and Chevalier sourced the tale to Madrid and classified it as a combination of tale types: 425L, "The Padlock on the Enchanted Husband", and 425N.

==== Catalan-speaking areas ====
In a Catalan language tale titled Es mel·loro rosso, a king has a sick daughter named N'Elienoreta, and the only cure for her is the “Es mel·loro rosso" that belongs to a king named Rei Tortuga (King Turtle). Rei Tortuga agrees to help the girl, in exchange for her marrying him. It happens thus, and N'Elienoreta is given the keys to his castle, with an order never to open a certain door. The girl's stepmother, however, visits her step-daughter, steals the keys and, while she is asleep, opens the forbidden door. Rei Tortuga, enraged at this betrayal, orders his majordomo, named N'Amet, to kill the girl and bring back her blood as proof of his deed. N'Amet disobeys the orders and spares N'Elienoreta, giving her a magic book and teaching her a spell she can use with it, then departs. The girl uses the book to create a palace bigger than Rei Tortuga's, who sends some servants to investigate it. N'Elienoreta invites each of the servants in, and asks if they could help her close the windows and doors. The servant goes to the window, and N'Elienoreta summons a fierce gust of wind to open the doors and windows, which the servants keep trying to close. Another variant was published by author Jordi des Racó (pen name of Antoni Maria Alcover i Sureda) in 1913, in newspaper ''La Aurora'', wherein the heroine is given the magic book by a fairy. Catalan scholar Carme Oriol recognized the tale as a variant of type AaTh 425N.

In a Catalan tale published by Joan Amades with the title La Princesa Dolçamel ("Princess Dolçamel"), translated to French as La Princesse Doucemiel, princess Doucemiel is thus named for her sweet and kind nature. However, she falls gravelly ill and doctors and sorcerers cannot find her a cure. Until one day, fairy Estarella comes to the king's court and says that only the Xervelli of a hundred and one colours can cure her, explaining the Xervelli is a bird that King Frog keeps in a cage in his realm. The king dispatches a servant to seek King Frog, and after a seven day long journey, arrives at a magnificent castle. King Frog's servant welcomes him, then returns with the Xervelli in a golden cage, saying that King Frog will demand something as reward. The servant brings the Xervelli to princess Doucemiel, who is cured by the bird's powers. Her father celebrates her restored health, and the servant returns the bird to King Frog, whose majordomo announces that the amphibian wants to marry the princess a year hence. The following year, the king brings princess Doucemiel to her fiancé, but the princess feels horror by looking at King Frog. After she settles into his castle, King Frog explains he is a cursed prince, and only by marrying a princess he will be able to turn back to human form. Princess Doucemiel asks for three days time to accept his proposal, and decides to ask for the Xervelli bird as wedding gift, since the animal looks at her with fondness. King Frog refuses to fulfill her request at first, but explains the bird is also a cursed prince that can be returned to normal by a princess's kiss, but if the bird turns first, King Frog cannot be restored to human form. The princess, defiantly, tells him she will do everything she can to disenchant the bird first. Enraged, King Frog orders his majordomo to take the princess to the forest, kill her and bring back a bottle with her blood. The majordomo takes the princess to the forest, but spares her, killing a wild animal in her place, then returns to King Frog's palace. As for the princess, she loses her way in the forest and meets fairy Estarella, who gives her a magic disc that can grant every she wishes. The fairy then vanishes. Doucemiel chants a spell and creates a palace larger than King Frog's with the disc. Back at his palace, King Frog, realizing his majordomo tricked him, sends another servant to check on the newly built palace. The princess is alerted of the danger by the magic disc, and she uses the magic disc for a downpour and orders King Frog's servant to busy himself with drawing water and unloading it in the river. The next time, King Frog sends other servants, whom Doucemiel orders to be kept busy with washing clothes. The third time, the princess orders the next group of servants to be kept busy with kissing a donkey's behind. King Frog then sends his own majordomo to investigate the palace, and the princess welcomes him. The majordomo promises to fetch the bird Xervelli for her, which he does by entering through a secret door in the Frog's palace. The majordomo brings the bird to Doucemiel, she kisses the bird and it turns into a handsome prince. At the same time, King Frog's palace, himself and his servants vanish into thin air, save for the majordomo, who escaped. The majordomo becomes a servant to Doucemiel, who marries the prince. According to Amades, the tale was provided by a teller named Madrona Desplats i Badoni de Gispert, in 1922, in Reus, Camp de Tarragona.

==== Galicia ====
In a Galician tale published in newspaper ''Galicia Moderna'' with the title O Cazador e o Lagarto ("The Hunter and the Lizard"), a hunter goes on a hunt and sights a large lizard in the distance. He aims his rifle at the animal, but the lizard warns him that the shot will not kill him, and he may devour the man. The lizard approaches the hunter, who asks him how he can be spared, and reptile asks for one of the hunter's daughters as his bride. The hunter agrees and returns home to explains the situation to his three daughters: the elder two refuse, save for the youngest one. The hunter brings the cadette to the lizard, who takes her as his bride. The animal also gives her a "cunquiña" (small bowl) that can grant her wishes with a command, and says he wants her to be a baker. The girl bakes some bread and goes to sell it in a fair. She draws the attention of some men at the fair and one of them accompanies her home. The girl then utters a spell on the small bowl and commands the man to winnow the flour for the whole evening. The next day, a second suitor tries to hit on the girl, and she uses the magic bowl again, this time for the man to be kept busy opening and closing a door for the whole night. The following day, a third man accompanies the girl back home, and the lizard's bride, through the magic bowl, commands the third man to look after her swine for the whole evening. Humiliated, the three men decide to take revenge on the girl and bring the case to court before a judge. The judge sends for the girl to be brought before the court, and she uses the magic bowl to cause a brawl between the judge, the bayliff and the scribe, until she recants the spell. The first humiliated suitor suggests the judge to adjourn the audience and for the scribe to muffle the girl's mouth before she utters any spell. The next morning, the girl appears in court; the men muffle her and remove the bowl from her hands, which cracks apart on the ground. The girl then explains everything, including about the lizard. The three suitors, the judge, the scribe and the bayliff go to the lizard's resting place and kill him in a surprise attack. The man who broke the small bowl courts the girl, then asks her father for her hand in marriage. (Note: Professor Camiño Noia Campos's Index of Galician Folktales, published in 2021, classifies the tale as type ATU 425B, "Son of the Witch".)

In a Galician tale from Ourense titled Conto do Lagarto ("Lizard's Tale"), a hunter sights a giant lizard on a hill and aims his rifle to shoot it, when the animal begs for his life and wishes to talk to him. The hunter approaches the lizard, who offers to make the man rich if he brings one of his daughters the next day. The lizard also allows the hunter to catch some game for the day (partridges and hares), which he brings home. The hunter returns home, dines with his wife and later explains the situation to his three daughters: the elder two refuse to go with the lizard, save for the youngest. The hunter's wife learns of her decision and refuses to let her go, but the girl insists and leaves with her father. She is delivered to the lizard, who gives her instructions: he gives her a paper for her to ask where she can find work as a maidservant, where she is to work for a whole year without gaining wages, and a magic "concha" to fulfill anything she requests of it. The girl goes on her way and meets some suspicious-looking hunters, whom she wishes to go another route through the use of the concha. She then reaches an inn, where she uses the concha to calm a crying child, then departs. The girl finally reaches a bakery and is hired as a helper. Three local students develop an infatuation with the newcomer, and one of them goes to court her. The girl uses the conch to force the man to knead the dough and bake the bread for her, for the whole night. Despite the humiliation, the student lies to his companions he spent the night with her. The next day, the second student goes to court her, and again she uses the concha to force him to do her work for her. The following day, the same thing happens to the third student. Now with a whole batch of bread, the girl goes to the market and sells her products, while commanding the concha to have people buy from her, not the other female bakers. The other women accuse her of witchcraft and bring the case to court. The girl goes to court with the three students under the concha's command, one of them kicking the horse's behind. When she enters the court, she commands the concha to force everyone to fight each other in a brawl, then calms everyone. Seeing the girl's powers, the people let her be. The girl returns to the bakery to work until the allotted time is up, then pays a visit to the inn she passed before, and finally reaches the lizard's meadow. Her father is there waiting for her, and so is the lizard, who turns into a youth. The youth explains he was cursed, but the hunter's daughter restored him and he wishes to marry her. The hunter, his daughter and the youth return home to arrange the wedding. However, the hunter's elder daughter, on seeing the cadette's luck in marrying a rich suitor, prepares some food with poison and tries to give it to her sister, but she exchanges the dishes. Thus, the elder daughter eats the poisoned dish and dies.

== See also ==
- The Story of Princess Zeineb and King Leopard
- Feather O' My Wing
- The Man Who Came Out Only at Night
