= Sea-Horse (folktale) =

Syrian folktale about a horse bridegroom

Sea-Horse (German: Seepferd) is a folktale from Syria, published by author Uwe Kuhr in his book Syrische Märchen ("Syrian Tales"). It deals with the marriage between a human maiden and a bridegroom of supernatural origin who hides under an equine disguise; she betrays his trust, and has to search for him.

It belongs to the international cycle of the Animal as Bridegroom or The Search for the Lost Husband, wherein a human princess marries a supernatural husband, loses him, and goes on a quest to find him. It mostly follows subtype ATU 425D, "The Vanished Husband", which segues into tale type ATU 425B, "The Son of the Witch", thus distantly related to the Graeco-Roman myth of Cupid and Psyche, in that the heroine is forced to perform difficult tasks for a witch or her mother-in-law.

== Summary ==
A king has three daughters and is gifted a wonderful horse "from the sea". The horse falls in love with the youngest, princess Lapislazuli, and one day, takes off the horseskin and becomes a youth. He reveals he is the king of ghouls. The king marries his daughter Lapislazuli to the horse. The horse takes off the horseskin and takes part in a racing contest in human shape, but his wife cannot tell the secret. He wins, but she betrays his secret in a moment of pride and he vanishes. Later, she builds a public bath house.

One day, a poor woman and her daughter wake up in a moonlit night and reach a meadow, where a man's voice orders tables and chairs to be set, laments over a lost love named Lapislazuli and has a meal with some companions. The woman and her daughter go to the public bath house and tell the princess the story, who asks to be taken to the meadow. Lapislazuli recognizes her husband and sees him, but Seepferde explains that he is to be married to his cousin, that his family and friends are ghouls that may devour her, but she can earn the mother's favour by suckling her breasts.

Seepferde takes Lapislazuli to the ghoul village and introduces her to his mother as a servant. Seepferde's ghoul mother forces Lapislazuli to do chores for the upcoming wedding: to sweep the floor with a tiny broom in a room full of pearls, to wash a pile of dirty clothes with a tiny bar of soap, and to get a sieve from the ghoul's sister. Seepferde summons his servants to do the chores for her, and instructs her to suckle on his aunt's breasts to avoid being eaten when she goes to get the sieve. As the wedding approaches, the ghoul mother orders Lapislazuli to hold a candle on each finger and to accompany the bride to the dressing room. During the occasion, Seepferde appears and plans with Lapizlazuli to burn the bride's hair. Lapislazuli goes back to the bride's dressing room and burns the bride's hair with the candles. While the ghouls try to put out the fire, Lapislazuli and Seepferde fly back to her kingdom, where they celebrate a new wedding.

== Analysis ==
=== Tale type ===
The tale is related to the cycle of the Animal as Bridegroom or The Search for the Lost Husband (tale type ATU 425), although belonging to two subtypes of the cycle: ATU 425D and ATU 425B.

In tale type ATU 425D, "The Vanished Husband", after betraying her supernatural husband's secret, she builds an inn, hospital or bath house to listen to passers-by's stories. One day, she listens to a person's narration about a flock of birds transforming into men in a place somewhere. The heroine recognizes it is about her husband and asks to be taken there.

Type ATU 425B, "The Son of the Witch", is considered by scholarship to correspond to the ancient Graeco-Roman myth of Cupid and Psyche, that is, the supernatural husband's mother forces the heroine, her daughter-in-law, to perform difficult and impossible tasks for her.

=== Motifs ===
==== The husband's location ====
According to Greek folklorist Georgios A. Megas, the main motif of tale type 425D is H11.1.1, "Recognition at inn [hospital, etc.], where all must tell their life histories". In the same vein, Swedish scholar Jan-Öjvind Swahn identified among the "motifs characteristic of subtype D" the bath-house, the inn, or places where the heroine goes to hear stories or news about her husband. In addition, in his study, Swahn determined that the bath-house as the location the heroine opens is "traditional" in Turkey, but also appears in Arabic, some Balkanic tales, and in a few Greek variants (in the latter along with the inn).

==== The horse bridegroom ====
According to researchers Samia Al Azharia Jahn and Ayten Fadel, the supernatural bridegroom may appear as a horse, a goat or a camel in Arab variants. Likewise, scholar Jan-Öjvind Swahn asserted that the animal or supernatural husband appears as a horse in tale type 425A "in the Orient". In addition, Swahn identified a motif he named "favourite horse desires the king's daughter", which he associated with his type A. (Note: In Swahn's monograph about Cupid and Psyche, subtype 425A corresponded to "Cupid and Psyche", being the "oldest" and containing the episode of the witch's tasks. In the international index, however, Swahn's typing is indexed as type ATU 425B, "The Son of the Witch".)

== Variants ==
=== Syria ===
==== The Bewitched Camel ====
In a variant collected from a Syrian refugee and published in 2015 with the title The Bewitched Camel, a woodcutter finds a camel that produces golden eggs in the forest and brings it home. One day, he brings the camel to the market and it falls in love with the princess. The camel asks the woodcutter's wife to ask for the hand of the princess, but the king demands he fulfills two tasks first: to bring extraordinary things and to build a castle overnight. The camel does and marries the princess. On the wedding night, the camel reveals he is a bewitched prince, and that his secret must stay between them. One day, the camel-prince fights in a war to defend the kingdom. The princess's sisters mock her marriage and she tells them the truth. The camel-prince disappears. She is advised by the minister to build a hammam (a public bathhouse), where everyone shall share stories. One day, a poor widow comes to the bathhouse and tells a story about a man coming out of the earth near a tree at night with three apples, lamenting over a lover who betrayed him. The princess notices it is her husband and goes to the place the widow described. She sees the earth cracking open and a prince comes out of it. She embraces him and he tells her that the witch cursed him to live underground. He takes her to the witch and she pretends to be a maid. The witch orders her to sweep her house with a beaded broom and not lose any bead, and to carry a heavy closed box to her sister's house in another country, (Note: A motif that appears tale type ATU 425B is that the heroine must travel to another witch's house and fetch from there a box or casket she must not open. German folklorist Hans-Jörg Uther remarked that these motives ("the quest for the casket" and the visit to the second witch) are "the essential feature" of the subtype.) which the princess accomplishes with the camel-prince's help: in the latter, while the wife rests a bit, the box opens on its own and snakes and monkeys leap out of it; her husband comes, draws the animals back into the box and closes it. Lastly, the witch decides to marry the camel-prince and orders the princess to dance at their wedding. As per the camel-prince's advice, the princess asks for a lantern and a wick to dance with, which, during the wedding, the camel-prince takes and throws it at the witch. They vanquish her and return to the princess's castle.

==== Gomena, Prince of the Djinn ====
In a Syrian tale translated as Gomena, principe dei ginn ("Gomena, Prince of the Djinni"), a poor fisherman lives with his three daughters. After two unlucky fishing trips, he catches a large stone from the sea and, upon his third daughter's suggestion, places it as a makeshift door for their home. Later the same day, the third daughter meets a handsome stranger, they connect and she marries him. Despite a comfortable life, her husband only appears at night, so, after some convincing by some women in the hamman (bath house), she decides to come clean to him. The man tells her to get the stone, throw it back to the sea, and to wait for the sunrise. She obeys; her husband appears in the sea, slowly submerging. She insists to know his name, and shouts to him; he reveals his name is Gomena, and vanishes under the waves, and so do her palaces and every treasure, save for her jewels on her. She sells her jewelry and opens a hammam, where everyone gets to bathe in exchange for a story. One night, a woman prepares to visit the hammam, but, since it is midnight and she is afraid of the ghouls, she climbs up a tree. She then sees three ginns appear, sing a song and announce the coming of Gomena; a table is set with a meal, Gomena appears and laments his lost love. The woman goes to the bath house and tells the girl about the scene. The girl goes to the place the woman described and waits until midnight for Gomena. He appears, sings verses of yearning and sorrow, and the girl appears to him, begging for his forgiveness. Gomena explains that his parents are the rulers of the ginns, and might kill her. After some insistence, Gomena takes his human wife on a magic carpet to his parents' palace. Before he enters, Gomena gives his wife an almond, a nut, and a pistachio nut for her to plant. However, the plants do grow overnight, but are stolen. Without food, she enters the ginns' service. One day, the queen of the ginns betroths Gomena to a female ginn, and orders the girl to go to queen's sister, invite her for Gomena's wedding and get the box of the marching band. Gomena explains that this task is a trap: his aunt is a ghoul and will devour her, so he gives her two pieces of cow meat to throw to two ferocious dogs, and advises her to get the box and escape. The human girl follows the instructions and flees from the aunt's house. She opens the box on the way back and small creatures playing instruments escape from it. Gomena gets the creatures back into the box. Next, the queen of the ginns orders the human girl to go back to the aunt's house and get from her a ceremonial carpet. She gets the carpet (a small one) and unrolls it on the way back. Gomena appears to wrap it again, and concocts a plan with his human wife: she is to dance at the wedding, but she is to ask for two torches. The next day, during the wedding, the human girl dances with the torches, to the ginns' amazement. She then tosses one torch on the bride's lap, the other on the ginn assemblage, and escapes with Gomena on a winged horse.

== See also ==
- The Golden Crab
- The Donkey's Head
- The Tale of the Woodcutter and his Daughters
- The Horse-Devil and the Witch
- Grünkappe
- The Padisah's Youngest Daughter and Her Donkey-Skull Husband
- The Camel Husband
