= The Man Who Came Out Only at Night =

Italian fairy tale rewriting by Italo Calvino

The Man Who Came Out Only at Night (Italian: L'uomo che usciva solo di notte) is an Italian fairy tale published by author Italo Calvino in the 20th century, in his work Italian Folktales, and sourced from Riviera di Ponente. The tale belongs to the international cycle of the Animal as Bridegroom as a subtype, with few variants reported across Europe and in Italy. In it, the heroine is delivered to a cursed or enchanted prince but breaks a taboo and loses him; later, she finds work elsewhere and wards off the unwanted advances of male suitors with the magical object her enchanted husband gave her.

== Sources ==
In his notes, Calvino indicated he used as a basis for his rewriting two tales collected by James Bruyn Andrews, in one of which the heroine marries a tortoise (tale Le Diamant (Variante 1)).

== Summary ==
A poor fisherman has three daughters. One day, a mysterious suitor that comes out only at night comes to court any of his daughters. Only the third agrees to be the man's bride. They marry and he reveals his secret: he is cursed to be a man by night and a tortoise by day; the only way to break the curse is for him to marry, but leave his wife to travel the world, and his wife must remain faithful and endure hardships for his sake. His wife agrees to help him, and he gives her a magic diamond ring. He becomes a tortoise and departs, while the girl goes to look for work. She finds a mother trying to make her son laugh, and the girl uses the ring on him; the baby dances, laughs and frolics.

Later, she comes to a bakery and uses the magic ring to make the bakery prosper while she is working there. Her work draws the attention of three suitors. The first man offers her money to spend a night with her; she uses the magic ring to make him knead bread dough for a whole night. The second man also offers her money; she rebuffs him by magically forcing him to blow the fire all night. The same happens to the third man: by the use of the ring, he spends the whole night shutting a door.

The three scorned men warn the authorities and some policemen and woman come to take the baker's assistant away. The girl uses the power of the ring and makes them beat each other up. The tortoise comes out of the sea and turns into a man for good.

== Analysis ==
=== Tale type ===
American folklorist D. L. Ashliman, in his 1987 study on folktales, classified Calvino's tale as type 425, "The Search for the Lost Husband".

French scholars Paul Delarue and Marie-Louise Thénèze, establishers of the French folktale catalogue, classified Andrews's tale as subtype 425N. Similarly, Renato Aprile, editor of the Italian Catalogue of Tales of Magic, classifies Andrews's story Le Diamant (variant) as subtype AT 425N.

In subtype AaTh 425N, "Bird Husband", after losing her husband, the heroine finds work somewhere else and has to avoid the romantic advances of unwanted suitors. According to Christine Goldberg, the heroine enchants the servants to be kept busy with some other task for the whole night.

In his monograph about Cupid and Psyche, Swedish scholar Jan-Öjvind Swahn proposed that subtype 425N derived from a type he designated as 425A, that is, "Cupid and Psyche", which contains the episode of the witch's tasks. (Note: In Stith Thompson's system, Swahn's type 425A is indexed as type AaTh 425B.)

However, after 2004, German folklorist Hans-Jörg Uther updated the international catalogue and subsumed type AaTh 425N under the more general type ATU 425B, "The Son of the Witch".

=== Motifs ===
==== The husband's magic token ====
The crow is the supernatural husband's form in Northern European variants, but in all of them the heroine receives a magical token from her husband: either a feather from the bird husband, or a ring. According to Swahn, the husband's token (feather or ring) is what allows the heroine to humiliate her unwanted suitors (akin to some variants of tale type ATU 313, "The Magic Flight"), and the feather as the token appears in German, English and Irish variants.

==== The enchanted suitors ====
Delarue and Thénèze described that subtype N is characterized by the motif of the tricked three youths - also found in type ATU 313. Similarly, Renato Aprile, in the Italian index of Tales of Magic, described subtype 425N as containing the episode of the suitors enchanted to perform the same action until morning.

== Variants ==
According to scholar Christine Goldberg, Swahn reported 17 variants of subtype 425N across Europe, in Ireland, Britain, Germany, Italy, Spain and France.

Author James Bruyn Andrews collected a French-language tale from Mentone with the title Le Diamant ("The Diamond"). In this tale, a man has three daughters. A youth, who becomes a frog by day and a man at night, asks to marry one of his daughters: the elder two refuse, save for the youngest. The frog-man marries the third sister, and tells her she is to keep quiet about his curse, but she betrays him and prolongs his penance. Still, he gives her a diamond that can grant anything she wishes into reality by the use of a magic spell. They part ways, and the girl meets a crying child she uses the diamond on to keep them from crying. Later, the girl finds work in a bakery and uses the diamond to help her job. While she is working as a baker, three suitors begin to show some interest in sleeping with her. The first day, the first suitor offers two thousand francs, and the girl curses him to be kept busy with sifting the flour for the whole night. The next day, the second suitor is made to blow the fire in the oven until the morning. The third day, the third suitor is made to keep closing the door for the whole night. Humiliated, the three suitors report the incident to the emperor, who sends five women to take the baker girl to his presence. The girl uses the diamond on the women and forces them to run, raise their petticoats and smack each other's butt. Next, the emperor sends four men to get her, but she commands them to play leapfrog with each other. After working in the bakery, she takes the francs with her and returns to her husband, who is no longer a frog. French scholars Paul Delarue and Marie-Louise Thénèze classified the tale as subtype 425N. Similarly, Renato Aprile, editor of the Italian Catalogue of Tales of Magic, classifies Le diamant as subtype AT 425N.

In an Italian tale collected from Inizio Novecento, Clavais, in Friulia, with the title La regjna che parturi' un orsín ("The Queen Who Gave Birth to a Bear"), a childless queen has a deep desire to have children, and utters aloud that she wants to have a son, even if he is a monster. Thus, the queen becomes pregnant and gives birth to a young bearcub, which they raise in a distant palace. As time goes by, the bear prince grows up and announces he wishes to be married. After much searching, a bride is found and they marry. However, the bear prince kills the first bride. He asks for a second bride, and another girl is given to him, whom he also kills. Later, the monarch finds a family with three daughters that can provide him with a third bride. The third and youngest sister of that family is kind enough to offer herself to the bear. She also prays to Virgin Mary, who fulfills her prayers for the bear prince to assume human form at night, between eleven and twelve o' clock. The bear prince, in human form, warns his wife not to reveal the secret, lest he vanishes to the glass mountain. They live like this for a while, until the bear prince's parents pester her to reveal the secret of their happy marriage. The girl refuses to divulge the secret, when the king threatens to kill her. The girl shares the bear prince's secret with them, the castle trembles and the bear prince vanishes. The girl goes in search of him in the glass mountain and finds a nice old lady on the road, who is the Virgin Mary, come to help her. The old lady advises the girl what to do in order to rescue her husband from a magician's clutches. She reaches the glass mountain and the magician forces her to recognize her husband in three tests: on the first day, among a group of frogs (she points to the third one); on the second day, among a group of doves (she points to the fifth one); on the third day, in the chicken coop, and she points to the ninth bird. After correctly guessing her husband's identity, the magician forces her on a last task: to herd all the sheep back from the stream. With the Virgin Mary's advice, she prevails yet again and the prince is released. However, the now human prince loses his memory of his wife and enjoys other pleasures, as the girl moves out to a house. While living in the house, the locals notice the stranger is beautiful and two local men, as well as her own husband, try to court her and want to spend the night with her. With some magic, she manages to deflect the advances of the first two suitors for the first two nights, until the prince, her husband, comes to talk to her on the third night. She makes him remember her by placing his right foot over his left one. The prince regains his memory and they reunite.

In an Italian tale titled La fǫra di ru s′ajpḙntí ("The Story of King Snake"), sourced from Sassari, Sardinia, a snake approaches a king who has three daughters and demands one of the princesses as his wife, lest the snake kills him. The monarch asks his daughters which one will go with the snake, and only the youngest accepts. The youngest princess lives with the snake, and discovers he becomes a human prince at night, but resumes serpentine form in the morning. The snake husband then asks the princess to keep his secret for three months and not reveal it to anyone, lest his curse will extend for more three years. The princess's elder sisters visit their cadette. During the visit, they douse a drink with some soporific drug to cause them to fall asleep, then steal their brother-in-law's snakeskin. The snake husband feels the princess betrayed him, but gives her a magic diamond, then departs. The princess takes the diamond and finds work in a bakery, making bread. Her work begins to draw the attention of local men who want to sleep with her. The first man, an officer, goes to talk to her for a night, but the princess, using the diamond, forces him to bake bread for her for the whole night. The next time, a lieutenant tries his luck in courting the princess, and she, using the diamond, glues him to a door and forces him to open and close it for the whole night. The third time, a captain tries to woo her, and she forces him to heat up the fire in the fireplace for the whole night to keep him busy. Humiliated by the ordeal, the three men summon some guards to arrest her, but she uses the diamond to command the guards. At last, after three more years, the princess's snake husband endures the curse to its end and is restored to human form. The princess and her husband return home.

In an Italian tale from Valle del Viù, in Piedmont, with the title Per virtù dë sta scàtola and translated as Per virtù di questa scatola ("By virtue of this box"), a snake appears to a king and requests one of his daughters as his bride. The youngest princess agrees to marry him, and discovers he becomes a handsome youth at night. Later, the princess's elder sister pay them a visit and spy on their brother-in-law through a keyhole, then steal his snakeskin. The youth, feeling betrayed, warns the princess they must depart, but gives the princess a magic box she can use to fulfill her wishes. The princess then finds work at a bakery and makes the place prosper. Soon, she draws the attention of some local admirers, who try to court her. The princess, however, forces the first admirer to spend the whole night making bread for her. For the second one, she glues him to a door and forces him to open and close a door. Humiliated, the men call some guards to arrest the girl, but she uses the magic box and forces the guards to kick and slap each other. Finally, the princess is brought to a public trial, where she uses the box again to humiliate the whole town, by forcing the locals and the praetor to kiss a donkey's behind.

== See also ==
- María, manos blancas
- Feather O' My Wing
- The Story of Princess Zeineb and King Leopard
