= The King's Daughter and the Dragon =

Die Königstochter und der Drache (English: The King's Daughter and the Dragon) is an oral tale provided by a German source in Hungary. The tale deals with the marriage between the youngest of three princesses to a mysterious husband that can only come to her at night; after discovering his identity and betraying his trust, he vanishes, and she has to seek him out, even submitting to fulfilling hard tasks for deity Venus.

Scholars have noted the tale is an example of how the Graeco-Roman myth of Cupid and Psyche entered European oral tradition via literary influence.

== Sources ==
The tale was collected in the Bavarian dialect, from a blind German teller in Gant, Hungary, named Lini Herchenröder, born in 1913.

== Summary ==
In this tale, a king has three daughters, Olvia, Alia and Elmira. (Note: Joachim Kühn noted that the heroine's sisters remain unnamed in mostly tales, but Leni's narration calls them Olvia, Alia and Elmira, which Kühn thought to mean, respectively, Olivia, Aglaia and Elvira.) The elder two are already married, save for the youngest. One day, a golden dove flies in through their window and gives the king a letter with instructions to guide Elmira to Drachenberg ('Dragon Mountain') in three days' time, where she will marry her monstrous husband. Sad for their daughter's fate, the royal couple wait for the allotted time and ready their daughter with bridal clothes, then escort her up Drachenberg and abandon her there. Soon enough, a voice tells her to come, and she jumps from the cliff onto a pink cloud that takes her to the underworld, to a lavish and furnished palace, where she is served by unseen servants at her beck and call.

At the palace, Elmira's mother-in-law makes herself known: it is old Venus, who asks Elmira to let the windows open for her husband to come at night. Her husband comes at night to their bed, and Elmira welcomes him with fear at first. They spend the night together and he departs in the morning. Weeks later, the mysterious husband tells Elmira her elder sisters will come for a visit, but she is to tell them nothing, lest they bring her misfortune. Despite not believing the warnings, she welcomes her sisters after they jump on the pink cloud.

During their visit, the sisters discuss Elmira's unseen husband, whom Elmira says is away on a hunt, but her sisters suggest he might be a monster. Elmira sees them off, but her siblings begin to nurture jealousy towards their cadette's marital life. Weeks later, Elmira's mysterious husband allows his sisters-in-law for another visit, but warns Elmira she is to say nothing about him. The girl welcomes her siblings once again, and they discuss her mysterious husband. Elmira reveals he is a bird by day and human at night, and her sisters advise her to take a candle and a knife to the bedchambers to better see him: if he is a monster, she should kill him; if he is handsome, then she should let him live.

That same night, Elmira takes a candle and knife and enters her chambers, then lights it up: she finds a handsome man on the bed. However, a drop of candlewax falls on his shoulder, waking him up. He admonishes Elmira for her betrayal, and flies away through the window. She grabs onto her husband's body and flies with him, but he says he cannot take her any further and abandons her in the upper world. The girl pays her sisters a visit and lies that her husband rejected her, opening the way for her sisters. The duo go the cliff and jump to their deaths.

Elmira goes to kill herself, but her husband rescues her and puts her softly in a meadow of beautiful flowers, where she wakes up. Venus appears and banishes her from the meadow. Elmira enters a wheat field and decides to put some ears of wheat in a pile, but Venus appears and banishes her again. Lastly, she enters a rose garden and plucks a rose on which there is an ant, so she moves the ant to another flower. Venus sends for her daughter-in-law and says the girl is to "fulfill three wishes" if Elmira is to redeem her son: first, she is to separate a large heap of barley, oats, wheat, rye, "Kukuruz" (corn) and other grains by morning. Elmira thinks about the task, when a colony of hundreds of thousands of ants appears to help her, since she helped the ant king back at the rosebush.

Venus complains that this was not Elmira's doing, but accepts it. On the second day, she orders her to fetch some cotton wool and oil for her to dress the wound Elmira caused on Venus's son's shoulder. Elmira walks down a path and meets an old woman, who advises her how to fetch the oil and cotton wool: down the path there will be a tree dripping with oil, and a flock of sheep; Elmira is to wait until noon for the sheep to rest, so she is to fetch some strands of their wool from the bushes. Elmira does as the old woman instructed and brings the oil and wool back to Venus.

Undefeated, Venus orders Elmira on a final task: to get a box with ointment from a royal castle, then gives her two silver crowns, to be given to a ferryman, and a piece of bread to be given to a dog. Elmira walks down a path and helps a man tie his bundle of wood. For her help, the man warns Elmira Venus only taught her how to enter the castle, not how to leave it, and explains Elmira is to place the silver crown between her teeth for the ferryman, break half of the bread to feed the dog with, ignore the wails of the people on the path, enter the castle and greet the queen, but refuse her offer of seat and food and sit only on the floor, then go back and feed the dog the other half of the bread and pay up the ferryman to ferry her across.

Elmira follows the instructions to the letter and meets the queen, who gives her a box with some ointment inside, then makes the way back to the ferryman. The ferryman is surprised to see Elmira return, and receives the second silver crown to carry her back. On the path back to Venus, Elmira decides to rest for a while, when another old woman appears and convinces her to open up the box and use some of the ointment on her skin. Elmira opens the box and a butterfly-bird flies out of the box, to her desperation. Elmira falls asleep, and a pair of butterfly-birds fly to her neck to suck her blood. Elmira's husband approaches her, laments the situation, and smashes the box, restoring the entire kingdom. Elmira and her husband then celebrate their wedding.

== Analysis ==
=== Tale type ===
The tale was classified, according to the international Aarne-Thompson Index as type ATU 425, "The Search for the Lost Husband". More specifically, it is classified as subtype ATU 425B, "Son of the Witch". This tale type involves the heroine being forced to perform tasks for a witch or her mother-in-law, but she is secretly helped by her husband or love interest.

German folklorist Hans-Jörg Uther, in the German Folktale Catalogue (German: Deutscher Märchenkatalog), names type ATU 425B as Der Sohn der Hexe (Amor und Psyche).

=== Motifs ===
==== The heroine's tasks ====
Another motif that appears in the tale type is that the heroine must travel to another witch's house and fetch from there a box or casket she must not open. German folklorist Hans-Jörg Uther remarked that these motives ("the quest for the casket" and the visit to the second witch) are "the essential feature" of the subtype.

=== Origins ===
Scholars like Donald Ward and Joachim Kühn suggest that the teller, Lini, despite being born blind, could have had access to a printed version of the tale of Cupid and Psyche and was told the tale by her grandfather. By doing so, she altered the mythic tale into an oral tale that owes its narrative heavily to the Apuleian fable.

Analysing Lini's tale, Joachim Kühn suggested that the immediate influence on Lini was a literary adaptation of Cupid and Psyche, published by Albert Ludwig von Grimm in 1817.

== See also ==
- Green Serpent
- Graciosa and Percinet
- The Singing, Springing Lark
