= The White Wolf (fairy tale) =

Belgian fairy tale

"The White Wolf" (French: Le Loup Blanc) is a French-language fairy tale collected from Wallonia by authors Auguste Gittée and Jules Lemoine. It is related to the international cycle of the Animal as Bridegroom or The Search for the Lost Husband, wherein a human princess marries a prince under an animal curse, loses him and has to search for him.

== Summary ==
A king has three daughters. One day, before he goes on a journey, he asks his daughters what he can bring as presents for them. The first one asks for a diamond parure, the middle one for a golden parure, and the third asks for the singing leaf.

The king looks for the singing leaf, but cannot find it, until he sights a White Wolf in the woods. The White Wolf promises him the singing leaf, but demands, in return, the first of his daughters that greets the king when he goes home. It so happens and the third princess meets her father.

The king takes his daughter to the White Wolf and leaves her there. The wolf guides her to his underground quarters: a magnificent palace with rich furniture. They live like this for some time, until one day the wolf announces that her elder sister is getting married. She decides to pay her family a visit, and the wolf consents; when the ceremony ends, she just has to shout for him to come, and he will come to get her.

The princess attends her elder sister's marriage, and summons the white wolf to get her. Some time later, the princess's middle sister is getting married, and the princess attends it too. She stays a bit longer and tries to summon the white wolf to come get her, but he does not appear.

The princess wanders off until she meets an old sorceress. The princess tells her story and the sorceress gives her three nuts, for her to use in time of extreme need.

At last, the princess passes through an ivory gate into a village and sees the White Wolf and another fiancée coming out of a church. The princess follows them to a castle. She cracks open one of the nuts and produces a golden bracelet. She gives the bracelet to the White Wolf's second fiancée so she can spend an hour walking with the White Wolf in the garden.

The princess cannot jog his memory, and repeats the action twice: on the second night, she cracks open a second nut and finds a golden necklace, which she gives to the second fiancée, and on the third night, she finds a crown encrusted with pearls and gemstone. Only on the third occasion, the princess manages to talk to White Wolf, by repeating the command he taught her: "White Wolf, come fetch me". He regains his memory and departs with the princess back to their castle.

== Analysis ==
=== Tale type ===
The tale is classified in the international Aarne-Thompson-Uther Index as type ATU 425A, "The Animal as Bridegroom". in this tale type, the heroine is a human maiden who marries a prince that is cursed to become an animal of some sort. She betrays his trust and he disappears, prompting a quest for him.

=== Motifs ===
In his study about Cupid and Psyche and other "animal bridegroom" tales, scholar Jan-Öjvind Swahn surmised that the animal husband appears as a wolf in Germanic areas and in French language.

As part of her journey, the heroine meets the Sun, the Moon and the Wind and gains their help, or she is helped by three old crones.

According to Hans-Jörg Uther, the main feature of tale type ATU 425A is "bribing the false bride for three nights with the husband". In fact, when he developed his revision of Aarne-Thompson's system, Uther remarked that an "essential" trait of the tale type ATU 425A was the "wife's quest and gifts" and "nights bought".

== Variants ==
=== Belgium ===
According to Auguste Vierset, Lemoine reported that he collected another tale from adult tellers in Gilly whose details were "identical" to Le Loup Blanc, although the heroine bribed the false bride for a night in the prince's quarters, instead of going on a walk with him. In a second variant from Gilly, the heroine reaches an ivory bridge that is slippery, so she has to wear special shoes to cross it; on the other side of the bridge, the heroine cracks open the nut and produces a carriage pulled by beautiful horses.

In another French-language variant from Wallonia, collected by Auguste Vierset with the title Gris-loup et Petite-cadette ("Grey Wolf and Little Youngest Sister"), a king has three daughters. Before he leaves on a journey, he asks what presents he can bring them: the first asks for a robe of gold and silver; the middle one for a cloak of gold and silver, and the youngest for a talking bird with golden head and silver neck. The king departs and cannot find the requested item, until he meets a wolf in the woods. The wolf promises to give the king the little bird in no time, but demands in exchange the first thing that greets him on his way home. The deal is made and the king returns home with the three objects, and is greeted first by his youngest daughter. The wolf appears after three days and takes the princess as his bride, taking her to his castle in the forest. After some time, the princess, feeling bored at her new home, asks the wolf to visit her family. The wolf thinks her family will want to know about her new life, but she assures him she will tell nothing. The wolf takes the princess to her father's castle, and after three days, they return. Some time later, the princess dreams her father died, and urges the wolf to take her back to her family. Once there, the sisters threaten the princess with guns. The princess reveals about the wolf: a man by night and a wolf by day. She senses something wrong with the wolf and goes back to this castle, but cannot find him. The princess wanders the world until she finds a hut. An old woman lets her in. The princess asks the old woman if she saw the wolf (named Gris-loup), and she is told he is to marry a king's daughter. Before the princess departs, the old woman gives her an apple, a nut and a hazelnut. The princess goes to a castle, where she finds work as a cleaning woman. On a grand dinner, the princess cracks open the nut and produces a gold and diamond wagon, and bribes the king's daughter for a night with the (now human) Gris-loup. She tries to make him remember, but fails. On the second day, she cuts open the apple in four pieces that become four horses decorated with gold and diamond. The third time, the princess cracks open the hazelnut and produces a little golden windmill. The princess gives it to the king's daughter and manages to wake Gris-loup up. At the end of the tale, Gris-loup, before the wedding guests, asks them a riddle: he had a key he lost; had a new one made, but found the previous one; which should he keep? The guests agree that he should keep the first key. And so Gris-loup stays with the princess, his first wife. According to author George Laport, the tale was collected in Saint-Hubert.

=== Netherlands ===
In a Frisian language tale collected by Frisian writer Ype Poortinga with the title De wite wolf ("The White Wolf"), a king has three daughters: the eldest is expert at music; the second well-versed in poetry, and the third is good at gardening. When the king is ready to go on a journey, he asks what he can bring them: the elder daughters asks for a trumpet, the middle one for a book of poetry, and the youngest for a flower she has never seen. The king goes on a journey and finds the elders' gifts, but cannot seem to find the flower. One day, however, he sights a shining flower on a tree and goes to fetch it, when a white wolf appears all of a sudden to block his way. The white wolf talks to the king about letting him have the flower, in exchange for the first thing that greets him on his way back. The king takes the flower home and the youngest princess is the one to greet him. Days pass, and the white wolf appears at the castle to get the princess. The king tries to pass off a shepherdess and a gardener's daughter as the princess, but the white wolf discovers the ruse and returns to get the real one. The white wolf takes the princess to his lair in a mountain cave, but it looks more like a person's dwelling. After nightfall, the white wolf becomes human and explains he is human at night and wolf during the day, but she must never tell anyone the secret. They live like this for a while, until one day the princess reveals the secret to her sisters after much insistence. The princess then returns to the wolf's cave, but cannot find him, only a letter from the wolf about how she betrayed him and how he is still stuck in lupine form. The princess then returns home and tries to look for him everywhere, when she finds an old woman on the road (a good fairy), who tells her the wolf received from her the flower, and only a princess could save him from the curse. Later, the princess finds a dwarf who directs her to a Glass Mountain, and gives her a nut to throw at the mountain to open up a passage. She rides to the Glass Mountain and tosses the nut at it, then tries to climb it, but it is so slippery. The same old woman appears before her and gives her a paste to glue under the horseshoes so she can climb the mountain. Atop the mountain, she reaches a castle where the white wolf, in human form, is to be married to another girl. The princess tries to talk to him, but he does not recognize her. She leaves the castle and cries, but the old woman appears to her and gives her a pill to place in the white wolf's goblet, so he can recall his memories. The princess follows the woman's advice and manages to recover the white wolf. He calls off the wedding to his second bride, and leaves the castle, but turns into a wolf again. Still trapped under the curse, the white wolf tells the princess they will get married in a nearby church. They marry and the white wolf's curse is lifted forever. He explains he was cursed by an evil fairy. The now human white wolf and the princess return to her father's castle and live happily ever after.

=== France ===
Folklorist François-Marie Luzel collected a French tale from Brittany with the title Le Loup Gris ("The Grey Wolf"). In this tale, an old widowed peasant has three daughters. One day, he finds in his own fields a grey wolf. The animal demands one of the man's daughters in marriage and threatens him. The man goes home and tells his daughters about the animal's proposal. Only the youngest accepts and becomes the wolf's bride. When they go to church to be married, they step on the altar and the wolf takes off the wolfskin to become a human prince. The girl rejoices in the fact and gladly marries him. Months later, the girl gives birth to a boy. The boy's godparents go to the village church to baptize him, and so does the wolf prince. However, before he departs, he gives his wife a key and instructs her to keep the wolfskin safe inside a box. The girl's elder sisters, out of jealousy, steal the key, take out the wolfskin and throw it in the fire. The wolf prince senses something wrong with the wolfskin and rushes back home. He enters his wife's room and blames her for her sisters' doing. He gives her three nuts but makes a vow that she will only find him again if she wears down three pairs of steel shoes, then disappears. She commissions the steel shoes to be made and begins her long search. At last she reaches the foot of a steep mountain, and some washerwomen near the lake try to wash a bloodied shirt that belongs to the wolf prince. The girl says a prayer and washes the blood from the shirt. She also learns that her husband, the wolf prince, is soon to be married the next day to another princess. That same night, the girl cracks open one of the nuts and produces a series of golden animals and objects. On the day of the wedding, the wolf prince and the second bride walk in front of the procession and spot the girl selling the golden objects. She offers the golden objects to the bride for a night with her husband. She cracks open the second nut on the second day and the third nut on the third, producing golden objects and gemstones she uses to bribe the second bride. On the third night, the wolf prince is alerted by a servant that the second bride gives him a sleeping draught; the girl manages to talk to him and he recognizes her. At the end of the tale, the wolf prince asks the guests the riddle of the old and the new key, and decides to stay with the first wife.

In another French tale from Brittany, with the title La Femme du Loup Gris ("The Grey Wolf's Wife"), a king in France has three daughters, the elder two always wearing the finest clothes, and the youngest, more humble, who spends her days with the servants listening to their stories. The elders named their cadette Luduennic ("Cinderella"). One day, the king, who loves to hunt, loses his way during a hunt, but eventually finds a castle that belongs to a grey wolf. The animal welcomes him to stay the night, but, the next morning, orders him to ask if his eldest daughter will become the wolf's wife, otherwise, the wolf and his brother will destroy his kingdom. The king returns home and asks his elder daughter if she consents to become the wolf's wife; she declines. The next day, he repeats the question to his second daughter, and she also refuses. On the third day, he asks his youngest, Luduennic, and she agrees to the wolf's request. They marry and live like husband and wife. After three months, the grey wolf tells her her elder sister is to be married, and she may go; he gives her a ring that will prickle her finger to warn her to go home. She goes to her elder sister's wedding on a grand carriage and in fine garments, to her sisters' envy. Luduennic takes part in the festivities and, when the ring begins to prickle the finger, she stays a bit longer, until the ring prickles harder. She runs to her carriage and rushes back to the wolf-husband. When she arrives, the grey wolf is near death; she kisses him and begs him to forgive her delay. After three more months, the great wolf tells her her middle sister is marrying, and, while she is allowed to go, he warns her not to overstay, lest she won't see him again. At this time, she is visibly pregnant and pays a visit to her middle sister. Near midnight, the ring begins to prickle, but she delays her return and goes back later than the last time. After she returns to the grey wolf, the animal appears to be dead. She takes the body and places it near the fireplace to reanimate him. The wolf regains his consciousness and tells her that his curse would have ended as soon as she gave birth to their child, but now he will disappear to the Crystal Mountain, beyond the Blue Sea and the Red Sea, and will have to search for him with a pair of iron shoes and another pair of steel shoes. The wolf takes off his wolfskin, becomes a human prince, and departs to the Crystal Mountain. The princess goes after him; he throws behind him a golden ball, each time, which his wife collects; when she is near him, he turns around and slaps her; three drops of blood fall on his shirt, which the princess curses that no one but her can wash away. During her journey with the metal shoes, she finds a hut, where an old woman calls for her eagle son to take the princess to Crystal Mountain. Arriving at the foot of the mountain, she takes a ride on a fox's back to the Mountain summit. Atop the mountain, she washes her husband's dirty shirt and learns of the (now human) grey wolf is to be married to another wife. The princess bribes the second bride for three nights with the three golden balls. On the third night, the wolf prince's brother warns him about the drink his second wife gives him every night and avoids drinking it. On the third night, the princess wakes him up and he recognizes her. The next day, during a banquet, the prince asks the guests about the riddle of the old and new key and decides to stay with his first wife.

=== Germany ===
In a dialectal variant in the Heanzischer dialect collected by folklorist Johann Reinhard Bunker with the title Ta' waissi Wulf ("The White Wolf"), a king gets lost during a dark night, until a "schwarzen Jäger" ('dark hunter') offers to help, in exchange for the king's youngest daughter. A white wolf comes to take her. She eventually visits the house of the Moon, the Sun and the Wind, climbs a glass mountain and disenchants the white wolf.

In a German variant from Silesia, published by Friedmund von Arnim with the title Der König Weißenfels ("King Whiterock"), titular King Whiterock has a daughter. One day, he is away on a journey and does not know what kind of gift he can get his daughter. He meets a wolf that offers him a thing he has never seen (playing leaves and singing grass, a golden wheel and a golden Weif), but demands in return the first thing that appears under the gate. The princess gets the strange presents, but the wolf appears to claim her as his bride. The wolf flies with her over the forest and warns her not to fall asleep, but, midway on her aerial journey, she dozes off and falls off from the wolf into the forest below. She survives and lives for two years in the forest. She is eventually found and taken to a nearby castle. She finds out that the wolf who took her is there, in human form, but under a spell. She tries to reach him on the first night by bribing the queen with a golden gift. The second night, she gives the queen a spinning wheel. On the third and final night, the princess of Whiterock bribes the queen with the present her father gave her, and manages to talk to the wolf prince.

In a variant collected by Karl Müllenhoff with the title ''Der weiße Wolf'' ("The White Wolf"), a king gets lost during a hunt. A little black man offers to help him find his way back, in exchange for the first thing that greets him on his way back. The king returns home and is greeted by his youngest daughter. Eight days later, a white wolf appears to get the princess. The princess climbs on the wolf's back and they ride to the Glass Mountain. The princess questions the wolf about their long journey, and the wolf, annoyed, threatens to drop the girl off his back. After a few more questions, the wolf fulfills his threat and lets the princess slip from his back. The princess wanders off through the forest and reaches a hut. An old woman takes her in and gives her chicken soup. The woman tells her to talk to the Wind, and lets her take the chicken bones with her. The princess visits the Wind and the Sun, who also give her chicken soup, and tell her to consult with the Moon. The Moon takes her to the Glass Mountain, but it is so steep she cannot climb it. The princess, then, uses the chicken bones and one of the bones of her little finger to create a ladder to the Glass Mountain. She learns that the (now human) white wolf will marry another girl. She sings a song during the wedding party and makes the white wolf prince remember. The tale was also published by author Ludwig Bechstein in his work Ludwig Bechstein's Märchenbuch.

In a variant published by Germanist Ulrich Jahn with the title Der weisse Wolf ("The White Wolf"), a king and a queen have a beautiful daughter. One day, a suitor comes to their castle to court the princess. After the king returns from a hunt, he agrees to the wedding and gives his daughter to the man. The princess and the man ride a carriage through the forest. When they pass a certain distance, the man becomes a white wolf, and orders the princess to get a louse from his fur and throw it out of the carriage. The white wolf then warned her that if another carriage squashes the louse, the carriage and the wolf will disappear and the princess will be left alone in the woods. As the wolf predicted, another carriage, carrying the wolf human wife inside, squashes the louse and the white wolf disappears, leaving the princess in the woods. She survives by eating roots and berries, and meets a tinker, a broom maker and a discharged soldier - the latter the only one who knows of the white wolf. The soldier advises her to keep walking until she finds a hut. The princess does and an old woman welcomes her in. The old woman bids her eat a chicken for dinner, and hides her from her sons. Suddenly, the woman's sons, the Sun, the Star and the Moon, come, one at a time. The princess tells the Moon the whole story and the Moon advises her to return the way she came until she sees a body of water, and use the chicken bones to create a ladder. Before the princess leaves, she is given three dresses, one decorated with suns, the second with stars and the third with moons. The princess reaches the body of water, uses the chicken bones and climbs the ladder to the other margin. She reaches the white wolf's city and wears the first dress to draw the attention of the white wolf's wife. The princess gives the three dresses for three nights with the (now human) white wolf and manages to wake him up on the third time. The white wolf wakes up and gives the princess a sack of money. She returns to her father's castle and bids him summon all soldiers in the kingdom, hoping to find the discharged soldier that helped her. She does and they marry.

In a tale collected in Kattenstedt with the title Der Wolf mit dem Wockenbriefe ("The Wolf with the Wockenbrief"), a count is trying to find a present for his youngest daughter (the titular Wockenbrief, which, in the tale, is an ornated piece of parchment), but does not seem to find it. A wolf appears to him with the Wockenbrief, which he agrees to give the count in exchange for the first thing that greets the man on the way back. The count returns home and is met by his youngest daughter. The wolf comes to collect his due, but the count tries to trick him with a swineherd's daughter, then a cowherd's daughter. The wolf eventually gets the count's daughter and takes her and the gift with him. They live together in the forest, but the count's daughter leaves and cannot find her way through the forest. She finds a hut in the woods and a woman lets her in. The woman's husband, the Wind, enters soon enough and is told the whole story. Feeling sorry for the girl, he takes her to the wolf's castle the next morning and instructs her to use the Wockenbrief at the door when the sun is shining on it, to draw the wolf's second bride's attention. She sells the Wockenbrief for three nights with the (now human) wolf and manages to talk to him on the third night. The wolf and the count's daughter marry, and the second bride is banished.

In a German tale from Schleswig-Holstein with the title König Medowulf ("King Medowolf"), a woodcutter has an only daughter. One day, a wolf appears to him and declares that his daughter is to become his wife. The woodcutter gives his daughter to the wolf, which takes her to his castle. They live like husband and wife. One day, the girl wants to visit her parents. The wolf takes her back, and warns her not to listen to her mother. The girl pays no heed to the wolf's words and listens to her mother's suggestion: use three drops of her blood on the sleeping wolf at night to see his true face. The girl goes back to the wolf and applies what her mother told her: she sees that the wolf is a handsome prince. The prince awakens, laments for their happiness, and goes away. After the wolf prince does not return home, the girl begins a quest and passes by the house of the mother of the Wind first, who gives her a large nut and a silver dress. Next, she passes by the house of the mother of the Moon, who gives her a golden dress. Lastly, she passes by the house of the mother of the Sun, who gives her a dress of gold and diamond. The girl reaches another kingdom and uses the three dresses to bribe the local queen for three nights with the (now human) King Wolf. On the third night, King Wolf awakens and sees her. Now at a court, King Wolf asks the guests the riddle of an old and a new key, and the queen's father says he should keep the old one. Agreeing to the queen's father's answer, he stays with the woodcutter's daughter.

=== Lithuania ===
In a Lithuanian tale published by August Leskien and Karl Brugmann with the title Ápė báltaji vílka, translated into German as Vom weissen Wolf ("About the White Wolf"), a king has three daughters. Before he leaves on a journey to Vilna, he asks what his three daughters want in return. The third princess asks for a garland of wild flowers. He goes to Vilna, buys a dress for his elder, a kerchief for the middle one, but cannot find the gift the youngest requested. When he traverses a deep forest, he sees a white wolf with a garland of wild flowers on its head. The wolf makes a deal with him: he will forfeit the garland, but demands in exchange the first thing that greets the king on his return - whatever it is, the wolf will come in three days to fetch it. The king returns and his youngest daughter greets him. Dreading to fulfill his end of the deal, the king tries to trick the wolf with the daughter of a servant, but the animal discovers the ruse and returns to the castle until he gets the youngest princess on the third time. He takes her to a big farm and takes off his white wolf skin. They live together. Six months into their domestic arrangement, she visits her family on the occasion of her elder sister's wedding, then returns with the white wolf. After another six months, the princess returns for the middle one's wedding, and her mother, the queen, spies on her wolf son-in-law taking off the wolfskin. The queen orders the maids to heat up the oven and throw the wolfskin in the fire. After the animal skin is burnt, the human wolf disappears. The princess decides to look for him; she wanders through the forest and reaches a small hut, the Wind inside. She asks him if he saw the White Wolf, but he replies he does not know. The princess then visits the hut of the Star, the Moon and finally the Sun. The Sun answers he saw the White Wolf, but he is now married to another princess. To help the princess, the Sun gives her a pair of magical shoes, a spinning wheel that can spin moss into silk, a carving knife that whenever carves out wood golden shards appear, and a fork. The princess wears the shoes and reaches the foot of a Glass Mountain, but the mountain is so steep she has to ask a blacksmith to shod her hands and fashion her a chain. She finally climbs the mountain and walks into a courtyard. She disguises herself as an old woman and bribes the second wife with the Sun's golden gifts for three nights with the white wolf. After the third night, the white wolf wakes up and remembers his former wife. At an assembled court, the white wolf asks the guests a riddle of an old key and a new one.
