= The Calf's Skin =

The Calf's Skin (Polish: Krówska skóra) is a Polish folktale from Silesia, about the marriage between a human maiden and a husband in bovine guise, after she makes a vow to marry the man in bovine skin to have access to water to heal her father.

The tale is related to the international cycle of the Animal as Bridegroom or The Search for the Lost Husband: a human maiden marries an animal that is a prince in disguise, breaks a taboo and loses him, and she has to seek him out. The first part of the tale is related to tale type ATU 440, "The Frog Prince", in that a girl promises to marry the animal that lives by the well in exchange for a favour.

== Publication ==
The tale was collected by Lucjan Malinowski from a source in Uciszkowe, Kozielsk, Silesia with the name Karczmarka Koszelka Mertina. The tale was reprinted and titled in Polish as Krówska skóra ("Cow's Skin") and by Pawol Nedo as Princ v kravské kůži (O dziewczynie i o królewiczu w krowiej skórze) ("Prince in Cow Skin (About the girl and the prince in cow's skin)"). It was translated to Hungarian as A tehénbőr ("The Cowhide"), to German as Vom Mädchen und dem Prinzen in der Kuhhaut ("About the Maiden and the Prince in Cowskin"), and to English as The Calf's Skin.

== Summary ==
In this tale, a father has three daughters. One day, he falls ill and only the water from the well outside the village can restore his health. The elder daughter goes to the well to draw water, but she hears a voice asking her to become his wife in exchange for the water. The elder one returns empty-handed. The same thing happens to the middle daughter. The youngest goes to the well, hears the voice's proposal, and agrees to be its, then takes the water to her father. At night, a creature knocks on the door: a man in cow's skin, who sings in verse to be let in, just like the girl promised him. The girl lets the creature in and gives it some food. It enters her room and takes off the cow skin and becomes a handsome youth, then dons the cowskin at midnight again. On the second night, he takes off the cow skin and reveals the girl he is an enchanted prince, whom she can save from his enchantment by not telling everyone about it. However, the girl tells her mother about his secret.

On the third night, while everyone is asleep, the girl's mother steals the prince's cow skin to burn it. The next morning, the prince realizes he does not have his disguise with him, then goes to look for it: it has shriveled due to the burning. He then tells the girl he will depart to the Red Sea, and she will only find him again by wearing out iron shoes, walking with an iron cane and filling an iron jug with her tears. With these words, he vanishes. She dons the iron apparel and begins her journey, passing by the houses of the Moon and his wife, then the Moon's brother, the Sun, and his wife, and finally by the house of the Wind and his wife. Neither the Moon, nor the Sun knows where the prince is, but they give her a nut. When she reaches the house of the Wind, the Wind knows where he is, and his wife advises the girl to pocket some bones from her dish, for it may help her. The Wind gives the girl a third nut, and says the prince is in a castle, living with another woman.

The Wind takes the girl to the castle, where she gives the bones to the guard dogs. She hires herself as a goose herder and works in the castle. At night, she cracks open the first nut, producing a silver dress which she trades with the lady of the castle for a night with the prince. On the first night, she fails to wake him up, for the prince has drunk a sleeping potion. The girl cracks open the second nut, producing a golden dress which she trades for a second night, and finally the last nut, releasing clothes made of diamonds, which she trades for the last night. The prince avoids drinking the potion and talks to the girl in the last night, recognizing her. He then marries the girl and reduces the lady of the castle to their goose herder.

== Analysis ==
=== Tale type ===
The tale was classified by Sorbian ethnologue Pawol Nedo as a combination of types 440 and 425.

==== ATU 440: The Frog Prince ====
The first part of the tale is classified as tale type ATU 440, "The Frog Prince", or, in the Polish Folktale Catalogue, devised by Julian Krzyżanowski, T 440, "Królewicz wąż" ("Prince-Snake"): the heroine promises to marry a snake or a frog after the animal fetches a ring from the well or it helps her bring water to cure a person's illness; the animal appears at the heroine's house to fulfill her promise, spending the night with her; she then disenchants him through some method (decapitation, kissing, or throwing him at the wall). However, Krzyżanowski noted that type 440, unlike its "twin story", "Amor i Psyche", lacks the husband's disappearance and the eventual reunion.

==== ATU 425A: The Animal (Monster) as Bridegroom ====
Krzyżanowski classified the tale, as a whole, as Polish type T 425, Poszukiwanie utraconego męża (Amor i Psyche) ("In Search of the Lost Husband (Amor and Psyche)"). According to Jolanta Ługowska and Violetta Wróblewska, Polish tale type T 425 appears as follows: a father or mother has three daughters and falls ill, so the sisters go in search of a remedy (or the water of life) for their ailing parent, one after the other; they reach a fountain, but it is guarded by its master, who offers the water in exchange for marrying it. Only the youngest is successful and marries the creature, who, however, is actually a prince under an animal skin or disguise (of a frog, a snake, etc.). After finding the remedy for her parent, the heroine marries the prince in animal disguise, and is told by her husband not to reveal the secret. However, she reveals it to her mother or sisters, who burn the animal skin, causing their separation. The heroine goes in search of her husband, finding extraordinary helpers, gaining magic objects and meeting a false heroine or rival. As for the husband, he falls under the power of a witch.

In the international Aarne-Thompson-Uther Index, the second part of the tale corresponds to subtype ATU 425A, "The Animal (Monster) as Bridegroom". In this tale type, the princess burns the husband's animal skin and she must seek him out, even paying a visit to the Sun, the Moon and the Wind and gaining their help. In tale type ATU 425A, the heroine journeys far and wide to encounter her husband, and finds him at the mercy of a second spouse. The supernatural husband, now human, is put to sleep by the magic potion of the second spouse, so that the heroine has no chance of rescuing him.

=== Motifs ===
==== The heroine's gifts ====
According to Hans-Jörg Uther, the main feature of tale type ATU 425A is "bribing the false bride for three nights with the husband". In fact, when he developed his revision of Aarne-Thompson's system, Uther remarked that an "essential" trait of the tale type ATU 425A was the "wife's quest and gifts" and "nights bought".

== Variants ==
In a tale sourced to Poland, translated to French with the title La peau de loup ("The Wolf's Skin"), a man named Petrovitch has three daughters. One day, he falls ill, and his elder daughter goes to find some healing water from a magic fountain. However, a voice at the fountain tells the girl he will only let her have the water if she marries the owner of the voice. The elder daughter becomes afraid and rushes home. The middle daughter goes to draw water from the fountain and is asked the same question. The third daughter, Katia, goes to draw water and agrees to marry the voice, and cures her father. Soon enough, a man named Stanislas, wearing a wolf's skin, goes to meet Katia and spends the night with her in human shape, then dons the animal skin in the morning. This goes on for some time, when Katia's mother takes the wolfskin and burns it. Stanislas, betrayed, tells Katia she will find him at the Red Sea by filling a cauldron with her tears, and walking with iron shoes and an iron cane, then vanishes. Katia fills the cauldron with her tears, and commissions her father some iron shoes and an iron cane. She dons the iron apparel and takes a journey to find him: she passes by a house of an old man, who summons the Moon to ask about the location of the Red Sea, which the Moon does not know, but gives her a nut. Then, the Moon takes Katia to the Sun, where she gains another nut, and the Sun takes her to the Winds. The Winds tell Katia Stanislas is already married and lives in a castle beyond the Red Sea. The Winds take her there and give her a third nut. Katia asks for lodge with the local lady, and cracks open the first nut, releasing a silver dress. She dons the silver dress and goes to meet Stanislas, who does not recognize her, and his second wife, the sorceress of the fountain, who wishes to buy the dress. Katia trades the dress for a night with Stanislas, who is given the elixir of oblivion to fall asleep. Failing the first night, she cracks open the second nut and produces a golden dress, which she trades with the sorceress for another night with Stanislas, who also falls asleep in the second night. Katia cracks the last nut and finds an airy, light dress which she trades for a last night with Stanislas. Stanislas replaces the potion with mere water, recognizes his true wife, Katia, and embraces her. Defeated, the sorceress vanishes with the three dresses.

== See also ==
- The Crow (fairy tale)
- The Frog Queen
