= The Crow (fairy tale) =

Polish fairy tale about a prince in crow form

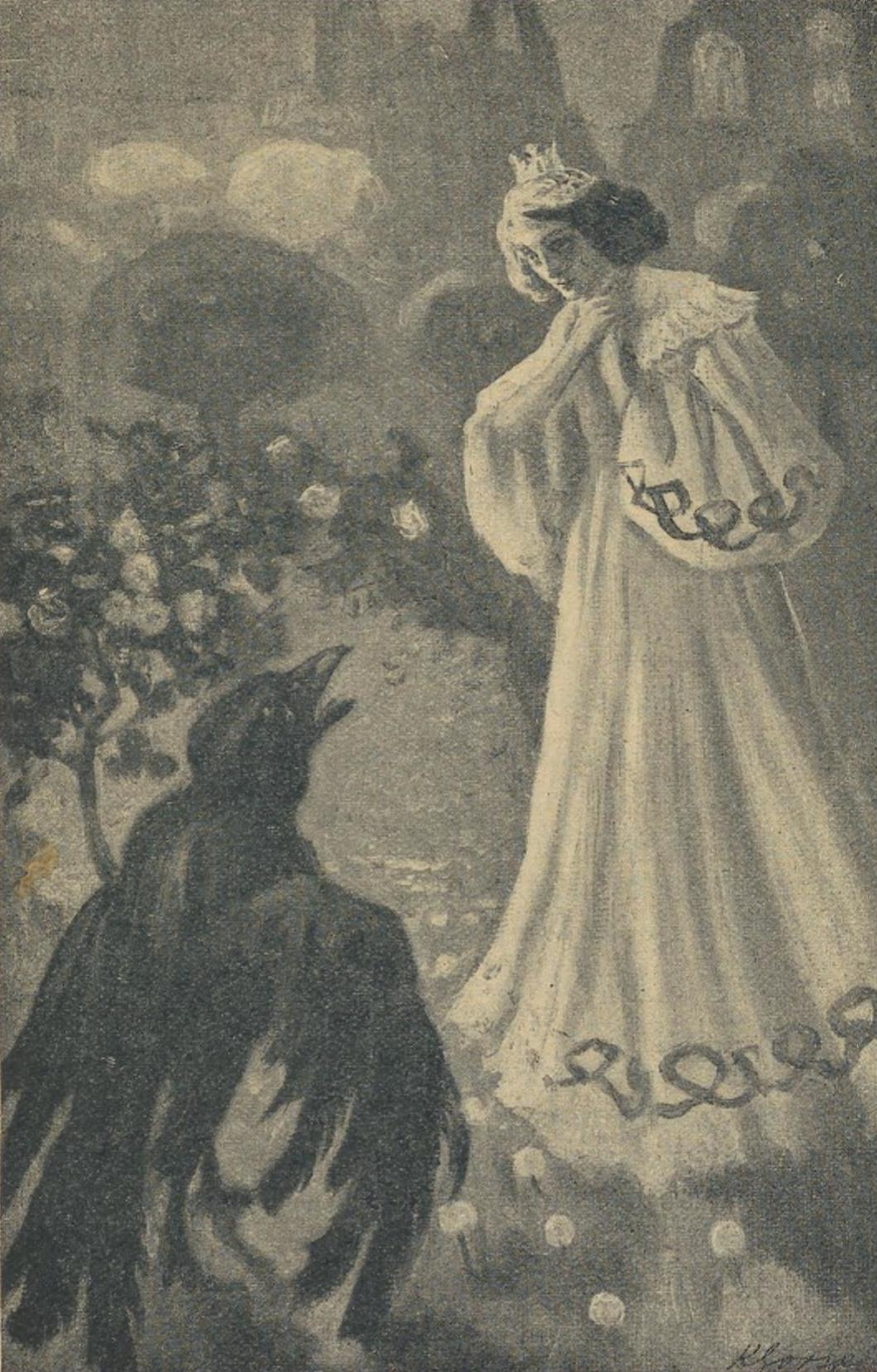
- The princess meets the prince in crow form. Image from a 1922 publication.

Folk tale
- Name: The Crow
- Also known as: The Enchanted Crow
- Aarne–Thompson grouping: ATU 425, "The Search for the Lost Husband"
- Region: Poland
- Published in: Klechdy Tom II (1837)

The Crow is a Slavic fairy tale of Polish origin. Scholars relate it to the international cycle of the Animal as Bridegroom or The Search for the Lost Husband: a human maiden marries an animal that is a prince in disguise, breaks a taboo and loses him, and she has to seek him out.

== Publication ==
The tale was originally published by Polish author Kazimierz Władysław Wójcicki, with the title Zaklęty w wronę ("Enchantment into a Crow"). It was later translated to German by Hermann Kletke as Die Krähe ("The Crow"), in his folktale compilation Märchensaal aller Völker. Anthony Montalba published it in English as The Enchanted Crow, while Andrew Lang included it in The Yellow Fairy Book with the title The Crow.

== Synopsis ==
A king has three beautiful daughters, although the youngest of them is the most admired. While walking in a garden near the ruins of a castle, the youngest princess comes upon a crow that has been badly wounded. Noticing that the princess pities it, the crow reveals to her that he is a prince enchanted into taking the form of a crow for seven years. However, should the princess agree to live in the one remaining room of the castle and sleep on the golden bed each night without making a sound, she might free him. He warns her that if she does not obey this, his suffering will be doubled.

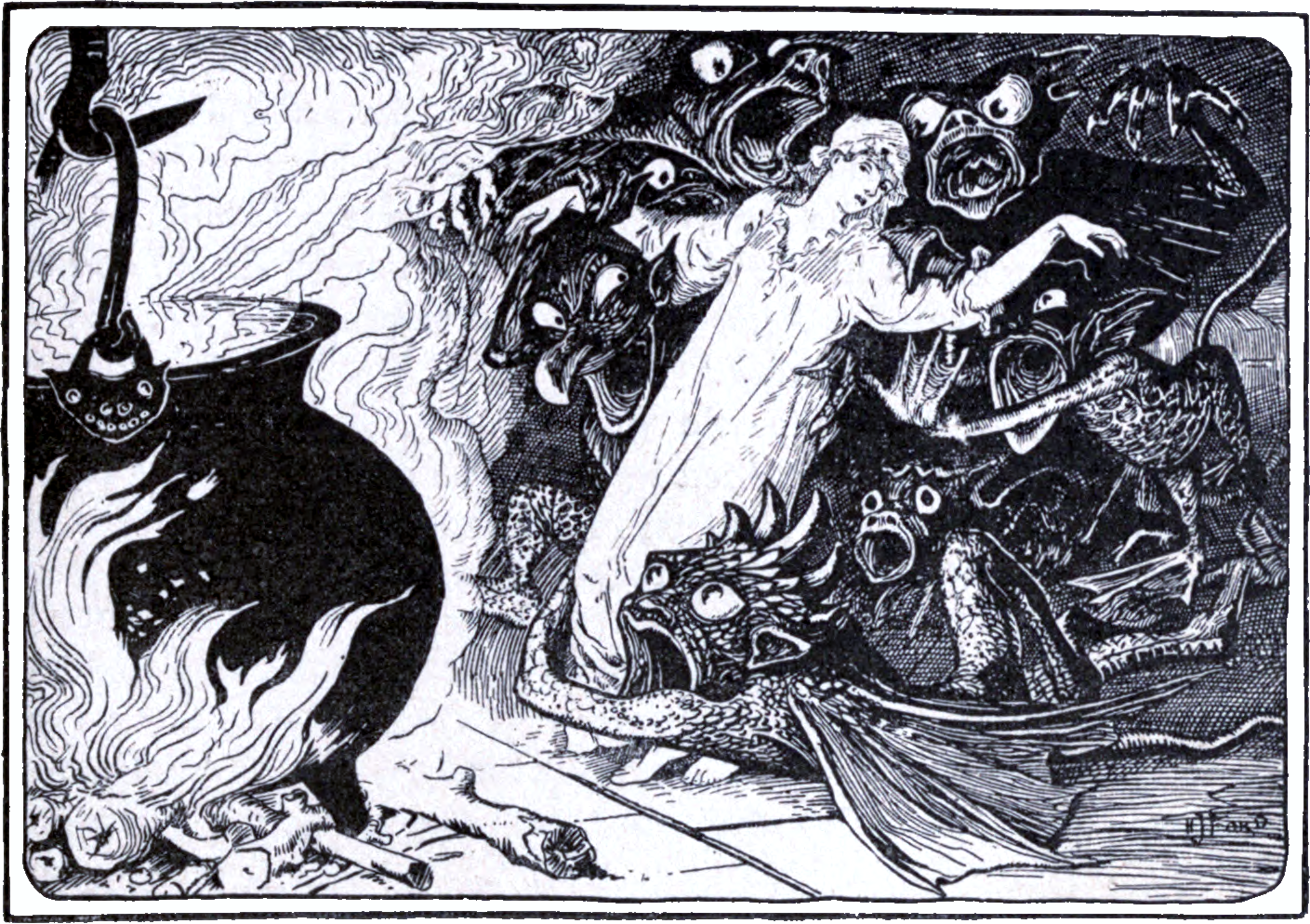
The fiends drag the princess to the cauldron. Illustration from The Yellow Fairy Book (1894).

The princess agrees and moves into the ruined castle. Every night at midnight, wicked ghosts appear and threaten her until dawn, yet in spite of her terror she makes no sound. One of her visiting sisters attempts to sleep in the golden bed herself, yet is so terrified by the apparitions she screams; the youngest princess insists on being alone after this incident. The princess continues on with her silence, and notices that each day the grateful crow looks and claims to be doing better than before.

After two years of this, the crow informs her that, to complete her task, the princess must find work as a servant for one year. She succeeds, but is treated poorly by her new master. As the year comes to an end, the prince regains his human form and marries the princess. They return to live in the ruined castle, which has now been fully restored.

== Analysis ==
=== Tale type ===
Scholars Jan-Öjvind Swahn and Julian Krzyżanowski related the tale to the international type AaTh 425, "The Search for the Lost Husband", a cycle of stories related to Cupid and Psyche.

Folklorist D. L. Ashliman classified the tale in the Aarne-Thompson Index (pre-2004) as type AaTh 425N, "The Bird Husband", in his 1987 study of folktales. However, after 2004, German folklorist Hans-Jörg Uther updated the international catalogue and subsumed type AaTh 425N under the more general type ATU 425B, "The Son of the Witch".

== Variants ==
Polish ethnographer Stanisław Ciszewski (pl) collected another variant with the name O zaklętym królewiczu ("About the enchanted prince"). In this tale, the prince character is cursed to be a raven (kruk, in the original text) for seven years, and the heroine is told to help him break the enchantment. On a footnote, Ciszewski cited the previous Polish tale Záklety we wrone.

== See also ==
- The Story of Princess Zeineb and King Leopard (AaTh 425N)
- The Calf's Skin

Fairy tales about a prince transformed into a bird:

- The Bird Lover (ATU 432)
- The Blue Bird (fairy tale) (French fairy tale)
- The Green Knight (fairy tale) (Danish fairy tale)
- The Feather of Finist the Falcon (Russian fairy tale)
- The Falcon Pipiristi (Komi folktale)
- The Canary Prince (Italian fairy tale)
- The Greenish Bird (Mexican fairy tale)
- The White Bird and His Wife
- The Girl Langa Langchung and the Rooster (Tibetan tale)
