= Hans-Jörg Uther =

German literary scholar and folklorist (born 1944)

Hans-Jörg Uther (born 20 July 1944) is a German literary scholar and folklorist.

== Biography ==
Born 20 July 1944, in Herzberg am Harz, Uther studied Folklore, Germanistik and History between 1969 and 1970 at LMU Munich and between 1970 and 1973 at the University of Göttingen. In his last academic year, he passed the first state examination for teaching at grammar schools. In 1971, he began a period of over 40 years working on the Enzyklopädie des Märchens, initially as a student assistant, from 1973 as an editor. In 1980, he became a PhD with the Dissertation "Behinderte in populären Erzählungen" ("The Disabled in Folktales") in Göttingen.

From 1990 to 1992, he was a lecturer at the University of Göttingen, and from 1991 to 1994 at the University-Gesamthochschule Essen. In 1994, he obtained his Habilitation there in German studies, literature and folklore. From 2000, he was professor extraordinarius for German and literature studies in Essen. Since 2010, Uther has been the head of the Enzyklopädie des Märchens until the end of the project at the end of 2015.

Uther published on comparative and historical folklore, on children's and youth literature, on folkloristic art history as well as on research into tale-types, their content, and motifs. From 1989 to 2002, he was editor of the series Die Märchen der Weltliteratur of Eugen Diederichs Verlag. Since 1988, he has been co-editor of the journal Fabula. He also published two important editions of Grimm's Fairy Tales in 1996 and 2004. In 2004, his revision of the Aarne-Thompson Index appeared. 138 of the approximately 4,000 articles in the Enzyklopädie des Märchens were written by Uther.

Uther has been a corresponding member of the Akademie für Kinder- und Jugendliteratur (Academy for Children's and Youth Literature) in Volkach since 1992 and, since 1993, "Folklore Fellow" of the Finnish Academy of Sciences in Helsinki. He also belongs to the scientific advisory board of the Brüder Grimm-Gesellschaft in Kassel.

== Major works ==
- Uther, Hans-Jörg (1981). Behinderte in populären Erzählungen : Studien zur historischen und vergleichenden Erzählforschung (in German). Berlin: De Gruyter. ISBN 3-11-008425-2. OCLC 7668184.
- —— (1987). Katalog zur Volkserzählung : Spezialbestände des Seminars für Volkskunde und der Enzyklopädie des Märchens, Göttingen, des Instituts für Europäische Ethnologie, Marburg, und des Instituts für Volkskunde, Freiburg im Breisgau / 1 A - K. (in German). München u.a.: Saur. ISBN 3-598-10669-6. OCLC 643261630.
- ——; Folklore Fellows; Suomalainen Tiedeakatemia; Suomen Tiedeseura (2011). The types of international folktales : a classification and bibliography, based on the system of Antti Aarne and Stith Thompson. Helsinki: Suomalainen Tiedeakatemia, Academia Scientiarum Fennica. ISBN 978-951-41-1054-2. OCLC 808126838.
- —— (2008). Handbuch zu den "Kinder- und Hausmärchen" der Brüder Grimm : Entstehung, Wirkung, Interpretation (in German). Berlin: Walter de Gruyter. ISBN 978-3-11-019441-8. OCLC 233035241.
- —— (2015). Deutscher Märchenkatalog ein Typenverzeichnis (in German). Münster: Waxmann Verlag. ISBN 978-3-8309-3332-8. OCLC 921522635.

== Biographies ==
- Kürschners Deutscher Gelehrten-Kalender 2005. Band III, Schi-Z. München 2005.
