= Saint Passaway =

Seychellois folktale about an animal bridegroom

Saint Passaway (Seychellois Creole: Sen Disparet; French: Saint Disparaît) is a Seychellois folktale that deals with the marriage between a human maiden and a bridegroom of supernatural origin; she betrays his trust, and has to search for him.

The tale is related to the international cycle of the Animal as Bridegroom or The Search for the Lost Husband, in that a human princess marries a supernatural or enchanted husband in animal form, breaks his trust and he disappears, having to search for him. Specifically, the tale belongs to a subtype of the cycle, classified in the international Aarne-Thompson-Uther Index as tale type ATU 425D, "The Vanished Husband".

== Sources ==
The tale was originally titled Sen Disparet, and translated to French as Saint Disparaît ("The Disappearing Saint"). It was collected from teller Edméa Crispin, from Grand'Anse Praslin. It was translated by folklorist Lee Haring as Saint Passaway.

== Summary ==
In this tale, a couple live together. One day, the wife asks her husband, a hunter, if he can find them a son. The man agrees, meets a snake in the woods and brings it home on a leaf which he hides under a basket. The man then tells his wife to look into the basket for his gift, but she finds a beautiful pearl necklace instead of a reptile. The man is astonished at this, and thinks the necklace must have come from the princess, who lost it in the river. The hunter says they, husband and wife, argue a lot, so they place the necklace on the bed between them. When the woman rolls around on bed, she reaches not for her husband, but for a baby boy who has appeared. The couple raise the boy, and he says his name is Prens Kolyé (Prince Necklace). Years later, Prince Kolye marries a human woman and they move out to another house, him becoming a hunter just like his adoptive father. One day, he warns his wife not to hire anyone while he is away from the house. After he leaves on a hunt, an old woman comes to their house and asks for a job and a place to stay. Prince Kolye's wife takes her in out of pity. Kolye returns and, on seeing the stranger, admonishes his wife, saying she will bring them misfortune.

Some days later, the old woman tells Prince Kolye's wife he has another name which he has never revealed to her. The girl confronts Prince Kolye about this information; at first he deflects the question, but promises to tell her by eight o'clock in morning. The next morning, his wife insists to know his true name, which he warns will cause them to separate and she will never see him again. Still, he gives her his ring, and says he will become a large snake. He then says his name is Sen Disparet (Saint Passaway, in Haring's translation), he turns into a large serpent and snakes back to the forest. His wife stays with their two sons in their house, sends a "lazeneral" ('alarm call') and promises to pay a large sum of money to anyone that can tell news of her husband.

People flock to her place and are given food and drinks, but none can tell anything of her husband's location. Elsewhere, a Malbar ('Indian') is cutting haygrass when he sights a cow and a goat. Suddenly, the animals utter a command, and an opening appears on the ground, through which the cow and goats enter. The Malbar trails behind the animals and reaches a subterranean room, where a table is being set by a pair of hands, a man appears and opens a newspaper, then asks a candlestick and a bouquet about his wife and sons; the objects answer they are doing well, but his wife is spending money to locate him. The man then eats his meal and prepares to leave, when a voice asks if he, Sen Disparet, is ready. Sen Disparet answers positively, then four girls appear to carry him away. The Malbar leaves the underground room and goes straight to Prince Kolye's wife to tell her he found him. Prince Kolye's wife asks to be taken there, and the Malbar explains they will follow the animals as soon as they enter the underground chamber. It happens thus and the girl finds her husband down there, but the Malbar tells her to wait.

The scene repeats and Sen Disparet asks the candlestick and the bouquet about his wife, and they reply she is fine, but the chamber now has seven people inside it. After the meal, his wife goes to talk to him, but he still blames her for causing their separation. Still, he advises her on how to rescue him: four angels will come to take him, so his wife should grab onto him; they will reach another place, where he will play the violin and do a dance to entertain the angels while his wife hides behind a gate, until the song stops and she will reveal herself; the angels will cry out in despair about a living being in the land of the dead, which will alert God Himself, Whom she is to tell she is looking for her husband.

Soon enough, four angels come to take Sen Disparet by his feet and his arms, and his wife holds onto his body. The angels notice their passenger is heavier, which he dismisses as having eaten too much. They fly to the land of the angels, and his wife hides behind a gate, while he plays the violin, then dances to entertain the angels. After he finishes playing, his human wife comes out of hiding, to the angels' despair, who cry out that a living being is there in the realm of the dead. God Himself appears and asks who is the living one; the girl introduces herself and says she is looking for Sen Disparet. God chastises the woman for disobeying her husband. The couple stands before God, Who slaps both of them so they fall asleep. When they wake up, they find themselves on bed, reunited at last. Back to the Malbar, God withdraws his belongings from the cave where Sen Disparet was, and the Malbar dies without getting his reward.

== Analysis ==
=== Tale type ===
The tale is related to the cycle of the Animal as Bridegroom or The Search for the Lost Husband (tale type ATU 425) and is classified, in the international Aarne-Thompson-Uther Index as subtype ATU 425D, "The Vanished Husband". In this subtype, after betraying her supernatural husband's secret, the heroine builds an inn, hospital or bath house to listen to passers-by's stories. One day, she listens to a person's narration about a flock of birds transforming into men in a place somewhere. The heroine recognizes it is about her husband and asks to be taken there.

=== Motifs ===
Professor Lee Haring identified, among others, the following motifs present in the tale: T676.1, "Childless woman adopts a serpent"; D425.1, "Transformation: snake to jewel"; C435.1, "Tabu: uttering spouse's name"; C932, "Loss of husband for breaking tabu"; N475, "Secret name overheard by eavesdropper". In addition, according to Stith Thompson and Jonas Balys study of motifs of Indian literature and oral folklore, the tale contains the motifs D425.1.3. "Transformation: snake to garland", B604.1, "Marriage to snake" and D391 "Transformation: serpent (snake) to person".

==== The husband's vanishing ====
In his work about Cupid and Psyche and other Animal as Bridegroom tales, Swedish scholar Jan-Öjvind Swahn identified that, in certain tales, the heroine causes her supernatural husband's disappearance by inquiring his name. Swahn named this motif The Name Taboo and surmised that it occurred "primarily in India". In Thompson and Roberts's Types of Indic Oral Tales, this motif appears in Indic type 425D Ind, "Search for Serpent Husband": the heroine insists to know her husband's caste or name, and he, in return, gives her an answer, but vanishes in the water like a snake. This episode corresponds with motifs C32.2., "Tabu: questioning supernatural husband"; C32.2.1, "Tabu: asking name of supernatural husband"; C32.2.2, "Tabu: asking where supernatural husband comes from", and C32.2.3, "Tabu: asking for caste of supernatural husband."

==== The husband's location ====
According to Greek folklorist Georgios A. Megas, the main motif of tale type 425D is H11.1.1, "Recognition at inn [hospital, etc.], where all must tell their life histories". In the same vein, Swedish scholar Jan-Öjvind Swahn identified among the "motifs characteristic of subtype D" the bath-house, the inn, or places where the heroine goes to hear stories or news about her husband.

== Variant ==
=== Sen Disparet ===
In a Seychellois tale collected from teller Jeanne Lemiel with the title Sen Disparet (The Disappearing Saint), a poor malbar ('Indian') earns his living by chopping trees in the forest and selling them to make charcoal. One time, he cuts down a tree and finds a box inside it, which holds a necklace. The malbar sells the ring to the king, who gives it to his daughter, the princess. She wears it during the day and takes it off at night. One night, she lies on her bed with the necklace still around her neck, and suddenly a youth appears besides her. The princess questions the presence of the youth, and he mentions the necklace. The girl cannot find the necklace neither around her neck nor in the box, and the youth explains he is the necklace, which the king bought her.

The princess falls in love with the youth, and in time she gives birth to three children: two sons and a daughter in three consecutive pregnancies. The queen realizes her daughter gave birth to her grandchildren, but she has not married anyone. She notices some children playing ball in the royal gardens and inquires whence they come from. A boy points to the princess, who is nursing another of her children. The princess tells her mother the king and queen brought him there, for they bought the necklace for the princess. The monarchs learn of the whole story and marry the princess to the mysterious boy, who asks his parents-in-law never to ask for his real name. The royal couple agree to his terms.

The princess marries the mysterious boy. Time passes, the queen begins to pester her daughter to ask her husband's name. She even supposes he must be hiding his name due to something he did in his past. Eventually, the princess decides to ask her husband his true name, since everyone has a birth name. The princess's husband warns him that she may never see him again if she insists to know this piece of information about him. Still, he relents and tells her: his name is Sen Disparet ("Disappearing Saint"). On saying this, he vanishes in front of his family. The princess cries for the loss of her husband, and the king makes an announcement: whoever bring news of the princess's husband shall gain half of his riches. However, in time no one knows of his whereabouts.

Back to the poor malbar, while he is in the forest, he spots a cow and a goat eating grass, when the animals begin to walk down an underground path underneath a stone. The malbar trails behind the animals until they all reach an underground room. The stone closes the entrance to the room, and the malbar is locked inside. He hides in a corner, and, by nightfall, Sen Disparet comes in the room and asks a candlestick about his wife and three children. The candlestick replies she is crying for him, and there are five people in the room, instead of four, as usual. Sen Disparet dismisses the last information as some animal that followed his cow and goat, while the malbar escapes the room the following morning.

The malbar goes straight to the princess and tells her he found her husband, Sen Disparet, and takes her to his location. They wait until the animals appear, then the goat and cow go the underground room, followed by the malbar and the princess. Down there, she finds her husband. Sen Disparet makes his prayers, then asks his chandelier about his wife and family. The candlestick answers that his family is fine, and his wife is happier still, for she is closer than ever, and that, tonight, there are six people in the room. Sen Disparet repeats the question to the candlestick, whose reply is the same.

The princess comes out of hiding and goes to meet her husband. Sen Disparet asks her what is she doing there and says he will depart the following day back to Heaven; an fiery armchair will appear, which he will sit on; his wife is to grab onto the armchair and be carried up to Heaven, where the angels will hold a feast to celebrate his return; she is to hide under the armchair and wait until they dance a waltz, when she is to finally appear and dance with him. The next morning, it happens as Sen Disparet described, and the princess holds onto the armchair to be brought to heaven, then hides under the furniture, then joins with her husband when he takes her out to dance. At midnight, the angels notice the scent of a living person in Heaven and decide to report to God Himself. God sees Sen Disparet dancing with his wife, pulls him aside and confronts him about the woman. Sen Disparet admits he has come to Earth and took a human wife, disobeying Him. God then orders him to go back to Earth and raise their three children, forbidding Sen Disparet from setting foot on Paradise ever again. Sen Disparet and his wife then return to Earth.

== See also ==
- The Golden Crab
- The Donkey's Head
- The Donkey's Head (Turkish folktale)
- The Camel Husband
- Princess Himal and Nagaray
- The Snake Prince
- Prince Lal Maluk
- The Story of Hira and Lal
- The Story of Halahal Kumar
