= The Donkey's Head (Turkish folktale) =

Turkish folktale

Folk tale
- Name: The Donkey's Head
- Also known as: Eşek-Kafası
- Aarne–Thompson grouping: ATU 425D, "The Vanished Husband"
- Region: Turkey
- Published in: Az gittik, uz gittik by Pertev Naili Boratav (1969)
- Related: The Golden Crab; The Camel Husband

The Donkey's Head (Turkish: Eşek-Kafası) is a Turkish folktale collected by Turkish folklorist Pertev Naili Boratav from his mother. The tale is related to the international cycle of the Animal as Bridegroom or The Search for the Lost Husband, in that a human princess marries a supernatural or enchanted husband in animal form, breaks his trust and he disappears, having to search for him. Specifically, the tale belongs to a subtype of the cycle, classified in the international Aarne-Thompson-Uther Index as tale type ATU 425D, "The Vanished Husband".

== Source ==
Boratav collected the tale from his own mother, Sidika Boratav, who first heard the story in Gemlik, when she was 12 years old. The tale was translated to German as Der Eselskopf ("The Donkey's Head") and to Russian as "Ослиная голова" ("Donkey's Head").

== Summary ==
An old couple have no sons. One day, the man is ploughing the fields and mutters to himself that Allah did not give him sons. Suddenly, a black man (or dervish) appears to him and gives him an apple, for the man to eat half and his wife to eat the other half. The man doubts the effectiveness of the apple and eats it whole. Nine months later, a donkey's head bursts out of his body. The man digs up a hole, buries the donkey's head, and returns home. Soon after, they hear the donkey's head voice shouting for them. The couple decide to take the creature, wrap it and throw it in the sea. The donkey's head survives and the couple, resigning themselves, raise it as their son.

Some twenty years later, the donkey's head tells them he wants to marry the padishah's daughter. The donkey's head magically produces a lavish carriage to take his mother to the padishah to ask for her hand in marriage in her son's stead. The padishah agrees to it, but orders first a palace to be built next to his. The donkey's head also creates the palace, and sets a condition for his bride: she is to come alone. The padishah's daughter goes to the bridegroom's palace and enters a room. She sees a tray nearby with a cloth on it. The girl takes off the cloth and sees the donkey's head. The creature falls on the ground and becomes a handsome man. He tells his bride not to reveal the secret to anyone, not even the slaves that serve their palace. One day, however, the padishah's daughter's nanny spies on her ward and sees the donkey's head. She screams. The donkey's head laments the fact, and tells his wife that he will leave, then vanishes. The padishah's daughter grieves for her lost husband and asks her father to build a bath house for her, where everyone can take a bath, in exchange for telling their stories.

One day, a boy named Keloglan asks his mother to go to the bathhouse. Keloglan goes to the river and dozes off. By moonlight, he wakes up and thinks it is daylight, then sees a strange sight unfold before him: two men come with forty mules, one chops firewood and the other loads the firewood on the mules. Keloglan follows the mules and reaches an underground chamber. The mules disappear and boiling cauldrons appear. Keloglan wanders a bit more and enters another room: donkey's head comes, turns into a man and sits at a table; a dove flies in, takes a bath and becomes a maiden; the maiden tries to comfort the man, but he rebuffs her; the maiden turns back into a dove and flies away. Keloglan returns to his mother and suggests they tell the padishah's daughter in the bath house. The padishah's daughter listens to the boy's tale and asks to be taken there.

The padishah's daughter follows the same trail and reaches the underground chamber. She hides in a closet and sees donkey's head and the dove come to the room. After the dove maiden leaves, donkey's head notices his human wife's presence and tells her the daughter of the padishah of the peris made him her prisoner. Donkey's head tells his wife to build a large cage with outward spikes: the couple is to enter it, so that the daughter of the padishah of the peris and her flying army will try to kill them, but will instead destroy themselves in the spikes. It happens thus; donkey's head is freed from his captor, and returns with his human wife to her kingdom.

== Analysis ==
=== Tale type ===
Boratav classified the tale as types AT 425A and AT 425D. The tale is related to the cycle of the Animal as Bridegroom or the Search for the Lost Husband, and classified in the international Aarne-Thompson-Uther Index as type ATU 425D, "The Vanished Husband". This type refers to a human girl marrying a supernatural husband in animal form; she betrays his secret and he disappears. In order to find him, she builds an inn, hospital or bath house to listen to passers-by's stories. One day, she listens to a person's narration about a flock of birds transforming into men in a place somewhere. The heroine recognizes it is about her husband and asks to be taken there.

In the Typen türkischer Volksmärchen ("Turkish Folktale Catalogue"), by Wolfram Eberhard and Pertev Naili Boratav, both scholars catalogued a similar tale type to ATU 425D, indexed as TTV, EB, or EbBo 92, "Der Affenmann" ("The Monkey Husband"). (Note: In his monograph about Cupid and Psyche, Swedish scholar Jan-Öjvind Swahn acknowledged that Turkish type 92 was his type 425D.) In this tale, a supernatural husband in simian form makes a princess laugh and marries her; the heroine betrays his secret and he disappears; the heroine then asks her father to build a bath house, where people can bath for free; one day, a Keloglan and his mother visit the princess's bath house and tell her about a lovelorn man somewhere, whom the princess recognizes as his husband and asks to be taken there. Boratav and Eberhard also noted that Turkish type TTV 92 was also "closely linked" to type TTV 98, "Der Pferdemann" ("The Horse Husband"), since the motifs of the open bath house and the Keloglan appear in some variants of the latter. (Note: In his monograph about Cupid and Psyche, Swedish scholar Jan-Öjvind Swahn acknowledged that Turkish type 98 was his type 425A, that is, "Cupid and Psyche", being the "oldest" and containing the episode of the witch's tasks.) In the same vein, Swedish scholar Jan-Öjvind Swahn noted that, in Turkish tales, the person that usually leads the heroine to her lost husband is the Keloglan.

=== Motifs ===
In Hans-Jörg Uther's revision of the index, published in 2004, type ATU 425D involves a poor couple finding or adopting an animal son, who later fulfills the king's tasks before marrying the princess.

==== The husband's location ====
According to Georgios A. Megas, the main motif of the tale type is H11.1.1, "Recognition at inn [hospital, etc.], where all must tell their life histories". In the same vein, Swedish scholar Jan-Öjvind Swahn identified among the "motifs characteristic of subtype D" the bath-house, the inn, or places where the heroine goes to hear stories or news about her husband. Marianne Klaar noted that the open bath house or free inn is an "extremely frequent" motif in Greek and Turkish fairy tales for the heroine to locate her missing spouse.

== Variants ==
=== Turkey ===
==== Tales with donkey's head ====
===== The Donkey's Head and the Padishah's Daughter =====
In a Turkish tale collected in Gaziantep with the title Eşekbaşı ile Padişah Kızı ("The Donkey's Head and the Padishah's Daughter"), an old couple are childless, and the wife wishes so ardently to have one, so she prays to Allah for one, even if he is a donkey's head. In answer to her prayer, she becomes pregnant and gives birth to a donkey's head as a son. His mother wails due to the creature she gave birth to, and the midwives promise to get rid of him. They try to lift him up, but he does not budge, and settles under the table. Years later, the donkey's head grows up and asks his mother to marry him off. The woman questions who would marry one such as him, and he mentions he wants the local padishah's youngest daughter as his bride. She is startled, and he advises her not to mention his name. The old woman goes to the padishah and asks for the hand of the youngest daughter. The padishah requests some suitor's tasks first, with her head on the line if she fails: to fill the palace cisterns, one with oil and the other with honey, and to provide forty camel loads of gold, diamonds, pearls, and other unparalleled treasures. The old woman returns home and explains the padishah's requests to the donkey's head, who sends his mother ahead of him to the padishah's palace and worry about nothing. The old woman goes to the palace and finds a litany of camels carrying loads of treasure, led by a white rooster singing poems, the cisterns are filled with oil and honey, and a palace has materialized next to the padishah's. The old woman is relieved her head is saved, and returns home to talk to her donkey's head son.

The wedding is arranged, and the old woman asks the donkey's head whether he has any conditions for the wedding: he tells her he is not to be seen until the wedding day, and she must hide him under a veil and place him under the bed. They celebrate the wedding, and the princess is left alone in the chambers. She finds the furniture, the walls and the door are all laughing and producing pearls and coral with their laughter. Suddenly, a handsome youth enters. He says he will come at night, but depart at the morning prayer, so she must keep the secret, for, if she tells anyone anything, she will not be able to find him even if she wears down iron sandals and an iron cane. In the morning, he leaves her. Her family pesters her with questions about her husband's appearance, but she keeps quiet. Her husband comes at night and leaves at dawn, and her relatives keep asking her questions about him. One day, she cannot stand it anymore and reveals it. She waits for him at night, but he does not come. She cries nonstop for him and becomes weaker with the passing of the days. Her parents worry for her condition. The princess decides to take action and asks her father for iron shoes and an iron staff, for she will search for her husband. Despite their protests, they give her the iron apparel and she begins a journey. She passes by cities and cities, but does not find any clue. She then decides to sell her ring and build a bathhouse for the people, so strangers can come and tell her their troubles.

People come, women come and bathe in the bathhouse, telling their stories. Years pass like this, and there is still no sign of her husband, so she begins to lose hope. One day, a dirty woman appears with her children in tow. The princess bids her enter and take a bath. Soon enough, the woman begins to narrate a fantastic tale: she is a widow with seven children, and forages for firewood to sell; one day, at dawn, she began to hear a song and found a white rooster singing a song and leading a procession of forty camels carrying jewels; the woman tried to steal any treasure from the last camel, but could not, so she trailed after the camels; after a long trip, they reached a glass palace without doors, the wall opened up and the camels went inside, where forty cauldrons were boiling with food; the woman also tried to steal some food, but a voice forbid her from doing so, mentioning their lady should come first; the woman entered a room and hid under the bed, and in came the white rooster, which shook itself, turned into a young man and cried on the bed, lamenting that he was apart from his wife and bidding the house to cry with him. The princess asks the woman to take her to the glass palace. They enter the palace and pass by the boiling cauldrons, from which the woman eats and the house laughs due to the princess's presence. The crying youth, from his room, suspects something is amiss and goes to investigate. The princess quickly grabs the rooster skin and throws it in the fire to burn it. Her husband, now in human form, questions the princess why she did this, since he was the son of the fairy king. The princess reunites with her husband, and they celebrate a forty-day and forty-night wedding.

===== The Donkey's Head (Kayseri) =====
In a tale from Kayseri, collected from an informant named Şerife Karataş by author Rasim Deniz with the dialectal title Eşşekbaşı, or Eşekbaşı ("The Donkey's Head), an old beggar woman keeps shouting for a "donkey's head". She returns home and sees a donkey's head coming out of her fireplace calling her its mother. The donkey's head asks the beggar woman to court the sultan's youngest daughter. The sultan marries his cadette to the princess, to her elder sisters' mockery that she married a donkey's head. However, he is actually a human prince named Sahmerdan Bey under the donkey's head. He removes his asinine disguise to take part in the cirit javelin competition. The princess reveals his identity and he vavnishes. The princess searches for him until she reaches another country and builds a hamam, offering baths for free in exchange for a story. A mother and daughter pair wish to go to the bathhouse, and follow a rooster to a secret palace, where peri maidens fly in next to a pool a bid their companion, Shahmerdan Bey, to come join them. The mother and daughter go to the princess's bathhouse and inform the princess of her husband's location. The girl also gives the princess his handkerchief, and the princess asks to be taken there. The princess reunites with her husband, Shahmerdan Bey, who says he is the son of a Sultan and a prisoner of the fairies. He gives his wife instructions on how to save him: kindle a large fire in the mountains and throw strands of his hair into it to draw out the fairies. The princess returns to her parents and asks them to build the large fire in order to save her husband. It happens thus, and she throws some of his hairs into the fire. The smell of burned hair attracts the peri maidens, who believe that Shahmerdan is dead and wonder what shall they do. Then they fly directly into the fire, destroying themselves for good. Finally released for the grasp of the fairies, Shahmerdan Bey returns to his human wife and remarries her in a forty-day and forty-night celebration.

==== Tales with snake husband ====
===== Ahmet Ağa =====
In a Turkish tale collected by Umay Günay from a source in Elazığ with the title Ahmet Ağa ("Mr. Ahmet"), Mr. Ahmet laments the fact that he has no children, and prays to Allah to give one to his wife. One day, a snake slithers down the chimney and introduces itself as their son, sent by Allah as answer to their prayers. Later, the snake son asks Mr. Ahmet to court the local sultan's daughter. Mr. Ahmet questions the idea of the sultan simply betrothing his daughter to the reptile, but the snake insists. However, Mr. Ahmet has a change of heart and does not go to the sultan. The snake son knows his adoptive father did not do as asked and bids him go for real this time. The sultan listens to Mr. Ahmet's courtship on the snake son's behalf, and the ruler demands the prospective bridegroom fulfills his conditions first, on penalty of death. Mr. Ahmet tells the snake son, who says he is to go to a place named Murat with stones, take three rocks and knock on the stone, give them the snake son's regards and bring a handful of earth and some seeds back home. Mr. Ahmet takes the earth and seeds and presents them to the snake, who does a circling motion with them. The next morning, a large palace appears with a lush garden in front. The sultan is surprised by the palace, and orders the groom to provide a retinue of a hundred riders in identical clothes and horses. The snake son provides the retinue, who come to take the bride to Mr. Ahmet's newly built palace. Nearing the man's palace, the princess tries to flee from the snake, but the snake says he is human under the snakeskin, a secret that must stay between them. In the wedding chambers, the snake takes off the snake disguise and becomes a handsome youth, so handsome the princess faints.

Later, the sultan's other child, a prince, is set to be married, and everyone is invited, even the princess and her snake husband. The princess goes ahead of him, while the snake hides behind a rock, turns into a human youth, and rides to the celebration. He rides into the gathering and defeats some javelin throwers, to the female attendees' delight, who mock the princess for her snake husband and sigh over the mysterious knight. The princess, fed up with the mockery, says the knight is her snake husband; he turns into a dove and flies away. The princess mourns for his vanishing, and asks her father to give her male garments, some gold coins, and a horse. She then goes on a long journey and reaches another land, where she asks people where is the best restaurant located. The princess gets her answer and announces she will open a restaurant where people can tell stories and drink and eat for free. The place's reputation reaches a distant country, where an old man and grandson pair decide to go there. On the road, the old man stops to rest, while the boy gathers some flowers upwards a mountain; atop the mountain, a large pool where birds become humans and take a bath, with an opening nearby with nice furniture inside. The boy and the grandfather reach the princess's eating establishment and report what they saw. The princess relinquishes the establishment to the boy and his grandfather and asks to be taken to the pool. After reaching the pool, she recognizes her husband, who asks what is she doing there, and she replies she will not leave without him. The now human snake husband takes the princess and both ride a horse back to the princess's kingdom, when the youth warns they will pass by a large-lipped Arap, his mother, whom she is to pet thrice and say to not touch them. The princess does as instructed and the Arap says her son taught her that. The princess and her husband return home and celebrate a new wedding.

===== Gül Ali =====
In a Turkish tale collected from a source in Manisa with the title Gül Ali, an old couple suffers for not having children. One day, the husband prays for a son, even if he is a snake. Thus one is born to them. They raise the snake as their son, but hide him on the upper floor of their house, and the snake accompanies his father in fetching firewood. One day, the snake son slithers away from home and sights a beautiful girl taking a bath, falling in love with her. He returns home and his parents ask him what is the matter. The snake son says he is in love with the padishah's daughter, and their parents remark he is a snake. Still, he asks his father to woo her on his behalf. The father goes to talk to the padishah, who agrees to the marriage, but orders him to prepare a large garden of roses and flowers, like a sea, between their houses. The snake asks his father to go to a certain rock he used to slither on and say that Gül Ali sends his regards, with some oil and bread. The father does and brings the oil with bread, which he is advised to dip in the oil, and a palace appears overnight. The padishah then orders a palace to be built for his daughter. The snake son sends his father to the same rock and asks him to find four sticks, which he uses to build the palace. Lastly, the padishah asks for a large wedding procession with forty horses, which the snake son, called Gül Ali, also provides with the help from the rock. The snake son is brought to the princess on the wedding night and begins to talk. The princess faints, but regains her consciousness. The snake son asks the princess to keep his secret, lest everything he owns vanishes with him. The princess agrees to his terms, and he removes his snakeskin to become a handsome youth. As time goes on, the padishah visits his daughter and wants to see his son-in-law, but the princess dismissively says he is elsewhere. Thus, the padishah organizes a tournament in hopes of him coming. Gül Ali, in snake form, tells his wife not to tell he will come as a contestant in white garments and on a white horse. At the tournament, the princess is asked about her husband, and points to the white knight, saying he is her husband. On doing this, the ground shakes, Gül Ali vanishes, and so does everything he provided. The princess asks her parents-in-law about her husband, but do not anything. Meanwhile, elsewhere, a man is preparing to take his elderly father to see a doctor. The princess asks her father to build a hospital, where people can attend and give news of her husband. Back to the father and son duo, they stop to rest on a fountain and see a bird entering a rock. After the third time, the man leaves his father by the fountain and enters the rock, where he hears that "Gül Ali still has fourteen scars out of fifteen to be healed". The man takes his father to the princess's hospital in search of a doctor and tell her about the fountain and the rock where he heard the name Gül Ali. The princess asks to be taken there, and leaves the hospital to the duo. The princess and the man go by the fountain, but they must wait a hundred years. After the elapsed time, they see a person with a raven entering a rock; after the third time, the princess enters the rock and hears about Gül Ali waiting for three of his four scars to be healed. The princess says she has come for Gül Ali and he appears to her. Upon reuniting, the palace and the garden of roses reappear.

===== Allah’ın Verdiği Yılan Evlat =====
In a Turkish tale collected from an informant named Kamer Gökirmak in Ereğli with the title Allah’ın Verdiği Yılan Evlat ("Allah-Given Snake Son"), a man named Ahmet prays to Allah to have a son. One day, he goes to the mountains and finds a skull. He goes there twice more and finds the same skull, which he pockets and takes home in a bag to his wife, Ayşe. Back home, a snake comes out of the bad and it wants to be the Ahmet and his wife's son, for Allah granted them their prayers. Later, the snake son asks Ahmet to ask for the hand of the padishah's daughter in marriage, by sitting on a chair in front of the padishah. Ahmet meets the padishah and tells him of his son's marriage plans, and the monarch sets some suitor's tasks first: to climb up and down a pole without dropping any coffee from a cup; next, to cut a large tree into forty equal pieces, and thirdly to defeat the padishah's strongest wrestler. Ahmet informs the snake son about it, and the snake gives him three strands of hair: one for him to drop in the coffee cup, the second to whet an ax, and the third for him to place on its back before he faces the padishah's wrestler. Ahmet fulfills the monarch's conditions with the use of the hairs, and marries his snake son to the princess. The princess meets the snake bridegroom, who reveals he is human underneath it, and warns the princess not to let anything happen to his serpentine disguise. Some time later, the queen pays her daughter, princess Sevgi, a visit, and is told the snake is human by watching his transformation by hiding behind a curtain in their chambers. The queen burns the snakeskin, and he turns into a bird and flies away. The princess dons iron shoes and a walking iron cane, and goes to search for him. Without any luck, she opens a restaurant at a crossroads where she offers food for free in exchange for people telling fantastic stories. One day, a man learns of the princess's restaurant and decides to go there, but stops to drink water from a lake. He accidentally falls into the lake: down there, he finds a door and opens it: inside, he finds a beautiful garden with many fairies (peris). The peris notice the human is there and flee, save for a male peri, whom the man asks why he did not escape with his companions, and the male peri answers: he married a son of Adam (a human) and was not ordered to leave. The man leaves the lake and goes to Sevgi's restaurant, where he tells her the events he witnessed at the lake. Sevgi asks to be taken to the lake. It happens thus, and Sevgi enters the door, where she finds her husband. They reunite and, after seven days, fly to the Heavens like peris.

===== The Snake =====
In a Turkish tale collected from a source in Artvin with the title Yılan ("The Snake"), a couple are childless, and whatever child they have dies soon after birth. Eventually, the wife has a snake for a son, something the husband laments to Allah to be given at his old age. Years later, the snake son begins to talk and asks his father to go to the Sultan's palace and sit on the "envoy's stone" to court the princess. The snake's father goes to talk to the sultan, who feels insulted on seeing such a dishevelled man, and tries to get rid of him by setting extravagant demands that he believes the old man cannot fulfill. Despite the difficulty of the requests, the snake son provides the sultan's demands, and the monarch is forced to concede and deliver his daughter to the snake. The old man brings the princess home to meet her suitor. In the room, the snake calls down to the princess and asks her is he can come down. The princess is afraid at first, but allows it; the snake then appears to her and becomes a handsome man before her. He explains his name is Zülfikar, who is a snake by day and human by night, so she needs to keep the secret. The princess agrees and they live like this for a time. One day, the queen becomes curious about her daughter and asks the sultan to find out what is going on with their daughter. They discover their daughter is quite happy with her situation, but cannot find the snake husband. One night, the queen decides to investigate the bridal bed and pulls up the covers, finding the human Zülfikar in bed. The man wakes up with a start, laments the situation, turns into a dove and flies away. The princess is saddened with her husband's vanishing and angry with her mother, and opens up an eatery at a crossroads for people to come eat and drink for free, with an inscription above the door asking if people ever hear the name of her missing husband, Zülfikar. An old man learns that he can eat and drink for free, when he spots a dove perching on a fountain. The old man quickly grabs the bird, but it flies to the Heavens with the man. In Heaven, people address the dove as Zülfikar, saying that he should not have brought a human person to the Heavens, so he should take him back to Earth. The dove-Zülfikar flies back to Earth with the old man. He then decides to go to the eatery to eat, and reads the inscription mentioning Zülfikar. The old man reacts to that name, and the princess notices this. She asks the man why he reacted so, and the old man recall the events that transpired with him near the fountain. The princess learns her husband is alive and asks to be taken there, giving the eatery to the old man. The princess goes to the fountain and sees the same dove perching on it; she grabs its legs and flies with the dove to the Heavens. Up in Heaven, its denizens admonish the dove, which they call Zülfikar, saying that he brought a person to the Heavens, so he should take her down there to live with her. The dove-Zülfikar takes his wife down to Earth and is reunited with her.

==== Tales with other creatures ====
===== Şıh Memmed =====
In a Turkish tale collected in Tokat province with the title Şıh Memmed, from informant Ibrahim Cirit, a padishah and a vizier are childless, and the padishah utters a prayer for Allah to give him a son, even if he is a lump of flesh. The duo wander the world for a solution, when a dervish appears to them and gives them an apple to be shared with their wives. Their wives become pregnant, and the vizier's wife gives birth to a girl and the queen to a lump of flesh ("top et", in the original), to the padishah's horror. The lump of flesh is kept in a basket. The tale explains that the vizier and the padishah made a promise to marry their offspring to each other. In time, the vizier's daughter grows and becomes a beautiful woman. As for the lump of flesh, one day he begins to talk and reminds his sleeping mother of the promise his father, the padishah, and the vizier made to marry them off. The queen tells the padishah, who does not believe that the lump of flesh even spoke. However, they consult with the vizier, who insists on fulfilling their vow and unite their families. The padishah marries his lump of flesh "son", in disbelief, to the vizier's daughter, and sends the couple to their chambers. The following morning, the vizier's daughter is quite happy. People comment with suspiction that there is something afoot with the newly married princess, so the padishah summons the staff and promises to reward whoever brings news of the mystery. A maidservant decides to discover the princess's secret and enters her room in the morning. When the princess returns at night, a pigeon comes out of the basket and pecks at her hand and face, so she bids "Şıh Memmed" appear before her and come to bed. Suddenly, the pigeon removes his clothes to become a youth and joins the princess in bed. The maidservant tells the padishah about the handsome son he has, and the monarch rewards her. However, for this, the pigeon, Şıh Memmed, turns into a dove, bids goodbye to his wife, and flies away.

The vizier's daughter laments that her husband is gone and falls into a state of despair and deep grief. The padishah enters the room, finds the princess in distress, but cannot find the lump of flesh, and asks the princess what to do. The princess asks the padishah to build her an inn in a remote part of the country, where she can serve people with food, drinks and lodging, in return for information about Şıh Memmed. It happens thus, but the princess still has no news of him. Meanwhile, in Erzurum, a herdsman named Memmed has a son. They decide to set off on a journey and reach a field. They stop to rest since the road is long and the father is old. The boy finds a fountain nearby for water, when suddenly a pir comes to draw water with a jug, then leaves. The boy follows the pir to a large impenatrable rock, and spies on the old pir shouting "Lebbeyk" three times. The rock opens and the pir enters, followed by the boy. Inside, there is dim lighting and the boy cannot discern whether the occupants are jinns or human. A group of forty people are there, then send Şıh Memmed next time to fetch water for them. The following morning, the rock opens the out comes Şıh Memmed to fetch water, and out comes the boy to reunite with his old father. The boy takes his father to the city of the princess's inn, and stay there for the night. The princess asks them if they saw a person named Şıh Memmed, and the boy says that he met him at a certain rock in a certain place. The princess promises to given them the whole inn, hotel and coffee house, and asks the boy to take her there. The boy takes the princess to the rock and they wait for a man to come draw water from the same fountain. The man fetches water, goes to the rock and utters the magic word to open the entrance. By doing this, the princess follows the man inside the rock, reunites with Şıh Memmed and never leaves again.

===== The Pigeon Man =====
In a Turkish tale collected in Kastamonu with the title Güvercin Adam ("The Pigeon Man"), from informant Canip Ilteroglu, a padishah has three daughters of marriageable age, but the monarch has forgotten about the occasion. Thus, the princesses hatch a plan: after a meal, watermelons are brought to the padishah, but the fruits are inedible (one is overripe, another inedible, and a third barely edible). The monarch thinks this is a prank, but his wife says that this was the princesses' doing, to represent that they are past the time for marriage. So the padishah sends invitations to seven kingdoms for suitors to pass in front of his palace, and the princesses will throw their handkerchiefs at their suitors of choice. The elder princess throws hers to the son of the Grand Vizier, the middle one to the Sheik al-Islam, respectively, on the first and the second days. On the third day, the youngest princess does not choose anyone, despite the gathering of eligible bachelors. She sits to cry, when she spots a dog with its tongue out and wagging its tail. The princess interprets that the dog is her destiny, and throws the handkerchief to it, to the crowd's mockery and the padishah's anger. He orders his cadette to be banished with the dog. The princess and a handmaid accompany the dog, which takes them to a mansion. The princess and the handmaid sleep in different rooms, and the princess's has a pool. In the middle of the night, a bird taps in the window and asks if she can keep the secret. The princess agrees and lets the bird in, which dives in the pool and becomes a handsome man. He reveal he is the son of the padishah of the peris, called Muhsin Bey, and asks her to keep his secret.

Sometime later, Muhsin Bey tells the princess her sisters will invite her to a bathhouse in order to extract the secret from her, but she is not to tell them. In order to verify her secrecy, Muhsin Bay places some cord that will become seven birds that will perch on the roof of the bathhouse; if the cord is not back in the drawer, that means she betrayed his secret and she will not find him again even if she searches for forty years. Muhsin Bey sends the princess on a lush carriage with her sisters, to the latter's jealousy. They enter the bathhouse and spend time talking. One time, the elder two ask mockingly about her relationship with the dog, and keep laughing at her marriage, when the princess' patience runs out and she blurts out about the dog and the mansion, but regrets her words, so she runs back home with her handmaiden and cannot find the cord. She faints and wakes up an hour later, then mourns for the missing lover. After a month, she goes in search of Muhsin Bey, but cannot find him after three years, so she has a large bathhouse built where people can bathe for free in exchange for telling stories.

One day, a poor woman goes to the bathhouse wanting to wash her laundry, but she is denied access since she has no story to tell. The poor woman goes to a riverbank to wash her clothes and lights a fire, when she sees mules carrying piles of woods. She follows the mules down in the river to a beautiful, paradisiacal mansion; she enters a kitchen filled with pastries and food, where she tries to steal a confectionary, but a voice forbids her. She also passes through a large garden with many trees, and a large hall with a pool. The poor woman hides in a corner and spies, at midnight, forty pigeons flying in, diving in the water and becoming fine men; the men sit to eat, converse, then each enters their room, save for a man that holds a cord and cries over it; in the morning, the men enter the pool, turn back into birds and fly away. The woman falls asleep and wakes up when the mules are returning to land with empty backs. The woman decides to return to the bathhouse and retells what she witnessed to the princess. The princess promises to give the bathhouse to the woman and asks to be taken to the place with the mules. They follow the mules to the underwater palace and the princess tries to pluck something to eat, which a voice allows since she is Muhsin Bey's wife. They hide behind a sofa and witness the forty birds alighting and turning into men. Most of the men enter their room, save for Muhsin Bey, who is crying over the cord. The princess comes out of hiding and reunites with him. Muhsin Bey is surprised to see her there, and says that she cannot be there, fearing his friends' knowing of her presence, and teleports them back to the surface. As promised, the princess transfers her possessions to the woman and returns with Muhsin Bey to their mansion.

Later, Muhsin Bey learns that his father-in-law's kingdom is in danger due to an attacking army, and dons a disguise as a human knight to protect his wife's father's realm by summoning forty knights in white and on black horses. He is hurt in the battle and the padishah dresses his wound with his own kerchief. The monarch loses his health by thinking about the identity of their helpers, and the doctors prescribe deer meat as cure. The padishah's other sons-in-law ride to the wilderness to catch some game, but find a hut selling deer meet and manned by Muhsin Bey, who they do not recognize. Muhsin Bey offers the deer meat in exchange for branding their buttocks with a seal. The sons-in-law bring some meat that is insipid, while Muhsin Bey takes some deer parts to his wife for her to cook and present the dish to her father. The princess does so and brings a dish for her father. The monarch in a fury orders her out of his room, when she notices his kerchief on her back - the same as the one he placed on the mysterious knight at the battlefield. The padishah orders for Muhsin Bey to be brought before him, and everything is clarified: Muhsin Bey was the knight, and he branded his brothers-in-law as his slaves. The padishah expels his sons-in-law with his daughters and nominates Muhsin Bey and the cadette princess as his successors.

=== Iraqi Turkmens ===
In an untitled tale from the Iraqi Turkmens, collected in Kirkuk, a padishah has three daughters, and marries the elder to the son of the right vizier and the middle daughter to the son of the left vizier. The cadette princess announces she will marry a horse, despite her father's concerns, and a horse breeder officiates their marriage. Years later, the padishah goes to war and loses the battle, when a mysterious horseman appears to turn the tide in his favour. At the palace, the princesses want to marry such a brave knight and mock their sister for marrying a horse, but the princess confesses that the knight is her horse husband, and she boasts about his prowess. The horse husband, who is the son of the king of the fairies (peris), comes back to the stables and admonishes the princess, called Fatmahan, about her betrayal, turns into a white dove, says she will find him by wearing down the soles of her shoes and the tip of the cane, and that is where she will find him, then flies off. Princess Fatmahan sells her possessions, puts the iron apparel and goes in search of him. She reaches a country and notices that the iron cane and the iron shoes are worn out, and realizes she may find her husband, Mehmed Çelebi, nearby. Thus she decides to build a baththouse, where people can gather to tell stories in exchange for a bath. Meanwhile, a poor mother with her three daughters work by spinning wool at night, and the girls want to visit the princess's bathhouse. Their mother worries that she does not have a story to tell, so she questions how she can take them there. One night, she goes to the market to sell some of their wool, and finds a mosquito carrying a bucket and a rooster guiding it. She follows the rooster to a mountain, which the bird opens with a twig, and goes inside. Inside the mountain, a home for the fairies. The woman tries to eat something, but the dishes rebuff her. The woman hides in a hole and witnesses as a white dove flies in with other birds, dives in a pool and they become youths. The dove-man holds a bracelet and cries for his lost love, then the youths become doves and fly away. The woman leaves the hidden palace in the morning and tells her daughters the strange sights she saw, then the group goes to the princess's bathhouse. Fatmahan listens to the story and asks to be taken there to the cave. The princess and the woman follow the rooster and enter the hidden cave, then serve themselves some of the food and tea. Later, they hide in a hole and witness the white pigeons fly in, turn humans and converse and make merry. One of the youths holds the same bracelet and bids his companions cry with him, but instead they laugh. The youth thinks his companions are mocking him, but the other bird-youths say his human beloved is there with them. The youths turn back into doves and fly away, leaving their companion with his human wife. The youth asks the princess to reveal herself, and they reunite.

In an untitled Iraqi Turkmen tale, a sultan's daughter spends her days in the garden of her courtyard. One day, a bird comes in and perches on her knee, then says she is his, and flies away. The bird does this everytime it comes in the garden, which piques the princess's curiosity. Finally, the bird comes and takes her away to a beautiful palace in the countryside, full of pools and orchards. The bird shakes itself and becomes an Arab person that serves her. At night, she eats dinner with the Arab and goes to bed. Despite her luxurious life, she is bored there. After ten days, the Arab notices the princess's boredom and promises to take her to visit her family. The Arab turns into a bird, carries her away back to the sultan's castle. The sultan and his wife regain their eyesight after seeing their daughter safe and sound, and their acquaintances and the court welcome her back. The princess explains that a bird carried her off to a palace where she cannot see who comes to her bad at night. They notice she is pregnant and deduce she must be given something to sleep soundly at night, so she is to avoid whatever substance they give her. The Arab overhears their conversation and, the following day, carries off the princess back to the palace. The princess distracts the Arab servant by dropping her ring in the pool. At the table, she is given some syrup to be put to sleep, but asks Hasan (the Arab servant's name) to fetch her ring. The princess spills the syrup, gets the ring and goes to sleep. At night, she sees another bird coming in, ruffling its feathers and becoming human. This human begins to talk to her, thinking her to be asleep, but she wakes up to face her mysterious companion. The mysterious person laments that mankind taught the princess deceit and trickery, sends for his servant Hasan and asks him to take the princess atop another mountain where she cannot hear his voice. Hasan leaves the princess atop the mountain and returns to his master. Despite the isolation, the princess, after a month, manages to climb down the mountain and reach land. She sells some pearls and diamonds she has with her and some gold to build a bathhouse, where people can bathe for free in exchange for telling stories and events. People learn of the free bath, and a poor girl and her mother want to go there for free. The poor girl wants to go, and offers to make up a lie and tell it to the princess, but her mother says she cannot lie, so they decide not to go for now. The poor mother and the girl spin some cotton all night, and the woman goes to sell the yarn in the market for some coin. When she hears the call to prayer, she opens the door and sees a calf. The girl runs after the calf and reaches a place where the a man utters a plea to open a mountain the mountain. The girl follows the calf into the mountain as it locks behind her. The girl sees a bird dive in, turn into a youth, and commanding a person to bring a person's eyeliner (kohl) and comb for him. The following morning, a young male servant asks the mountain to open. The girl asks the male servant for some rice, soap, oil and amenities, since this was the reason for her staying up late, and the servant provides. The poor girl returns home and tells her mother she has a story to share at the bathhouse. Thus, the mother and son duo go to the bathhouse and describe how she followed the calf to the mountain. The story the cuts to the princess and the poor girl waiting by the mountain for it to open, so they creep inside. The pair hides behind a tandoor over, and see a bird come in, shake itself, and become human. He is waited on with food and water for his hands and face, eats the meal, and bids his young male servant to bring the eyeliner and comb. The man cries over the belongings, and the princess recognizes her lover. The young servant reveals that princess Fatmahan has come to seek him, his master, and she reveals herself. They perform the ceremony between Fatmahan and her bird lover, and they reunite.

== See also ==
- The Golden Crab
- Princess Himal and Nagaray
- The Tale of the Woodcutter and his Daughters
- The Donkey's Head
- Sea-Horse (Syrian folktale)
- Saint Passaway
