= Donkeys in Tunisia =

Animal in Tunisia

Common donkey
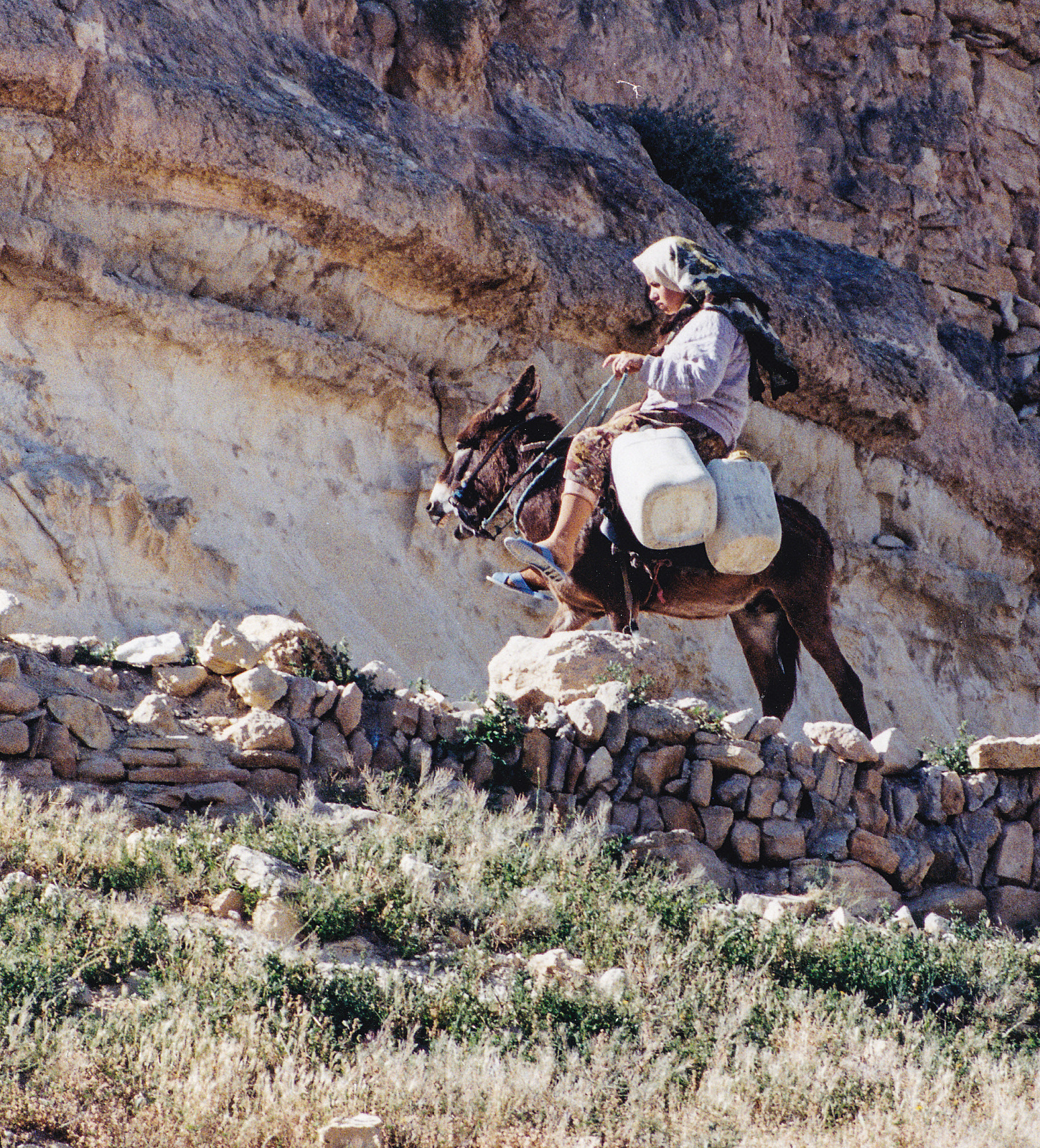
- Woman carrying water containers on the back of a donkey in the Tunisian mountains
- Use: Working animal

The donkey in Tunisia is historically a working animal which has existed in Carthage since the Antiquity, and had by the end of the 19th century become widespread. It was used for a number of domestic tasks, linked to traveling, and for transportation of water, agriculture, more specifically, to the cultivation and pressing of olives. The introduction of motorised vehicles considerably reduced their numbers, as their population fell by over half between 1996 and 2006, with a population of 123,000 recorded in 2006. In rural regions, the donkey is only put to use for small, specialized agricultural tasks, such as olive harvesting. The consumption of donkey meat has always been controversial, and it is considered makruh to consume domesticated donkey meat in Islamic tradition. l'Association pour la culture et les arts méditerranéens (ACAM) claimed in 2010 that the donkey is under threat of extinction in Tunisia.

The donkey is culturally devalued, with its name often used as an insult in Tunisian Arabic. However, it has also been the inspiration for some literary works, such as "Dispute de l'âne" by Anselm Turmeda (1417), as well as a number of folk tales.

== History ==
=== Prehistory & Antiquity ===
The donkey (Equus asinus) has always been a part of the rural countryside of North Africa. However, the origin of domesticated donkeys in the Maghreb is disputed. According to one theory, supported notably by l'Encyclopédie berbère, the domestic species is not native to the region, and is descended from the African wild donkey (E. africanus), whose origins are found in East Africa. According to the theory of Colin Groves (1986), a sub-species of the North African wild donkey (Equus africanus atlanticus) had lived until the first few centuries AD, but it is not known if it was domesticated, and it seems very unlikely.,. There are no archaeological remains of this subspecies so it can only be depicted through representations. Originating in the Atlas Mountains, E. a. atlanticus went extinct around 300 AD. Whatever its exact origins, the donkey was domesticated in Africa, the oldest proof of its use going back to the culture of Maadi-Bouto, in Egypt, in the 4th Millennium B.C... The history of the donkey in Africa is notoriously difficult to study as, although the species was widely used, very little was written about it, no plans for the development nor for the improvement of the species were developed, and very few archaeological remnants are left. There are no remains to document its existence in the Tunisian Sahara. The first domesticated donkeys, who originate from arid or semi-arid regions, are very sensitive to humidity.

Donkeys have been represented in cave paintings in areas of the Sahara since the earliest period of Antiquity, notably in Libya and Morocco. In De agri cultura, the Roman senator Cato the Elder gave a description of the donkey's role in the Mediterranean area under the Roman Empire, and in particular in Carthage. For every sixty hectares of olive groves four donkeys were needed, three to bring manure to the soil, and one to power the oil mill. For every 25 hectares of vineyard two donkeys were needed for tillage. The Golden Ass by Apuleius also provided valuable information concerning the uses of the donkey during the Antiquity in North Africa, notably regarding their use for carrying wood and food products to sell on the market. It is likely that equine veterinarian specialists were in work in Carthage starting from the 4th century BC. Donkey remains have been found in Carthage which dates back to between the first and fourth century, which are among the oldest archaeological proofs of the existence of donkeys in the Maghreb.

=== Middle Ages ===
The erudite Zenata Berber Abu Yazid (873-947), who fought the Fatimides and had a well-organized administration, was known as "The Man on the Donkey". The consumption of donkey meat would have, in all likelihood, been prohibited in Islam, to the extent that Muslims, as well as practising Christians in Tunisia, probably ate very little of it. Ibn Battûta (1304-1377), who comes from what is now known as Morocco, noted his disgust at the fact that donkey meat was consumed in the Mali Empire. However, at the start of the 16th century, donkey meat was likely to have been eaten by the nomadic Berbers of Mauritania.

=== 19th Century ===
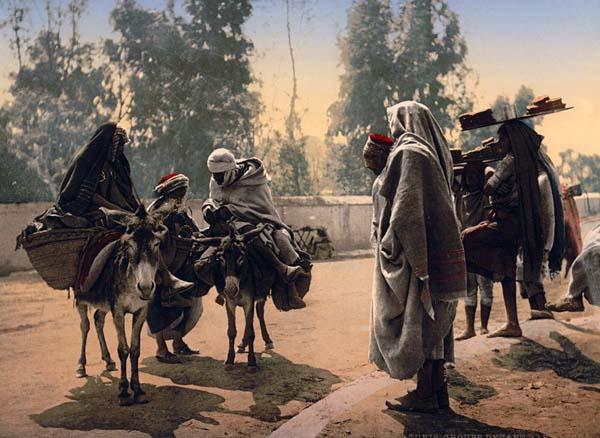
Photochrom of habitants of Tunis with their donkeys in 1899

According to an 1887 description provided by the naturalist Jean-Marie de Lanessan, there were a very large number of donkeys:

The most common animal is, without a doubt, the donkey. There isn't a single family, no matter how poor they might be, who doesn't own a donkey. I don't think it is an overestimation to suggest there are 5 donkeys for every person, making the total number of donkeys around three hundred thousand. The animal is very small in size, yet robust, and more temperate than the camel, if such a thing is possible. This is the animal who takes on domestic tasks, it is the animal the women use to fetch water from the well, and the one the men use to carry food from the markets, it is the donkey who carries everything produced in gardens and fields from the villages, corn, lucerne for the sheep and bullocks and freshly harvested wheat and barley. It is also the task of the donkey to transport the limited possessions of households who emigrate. The donkey is, in effect, the charger of the poor.

The population of the donkey in Tunisia reached its peak at the end of the 19th century, with various colonial sources reporting a population of 800,000. The animal could be spotted in particular in the mountainous regions of the north-west, the centre and the south of the country, where the ground is less fertile.

=== 20th & 21st Centuries ===
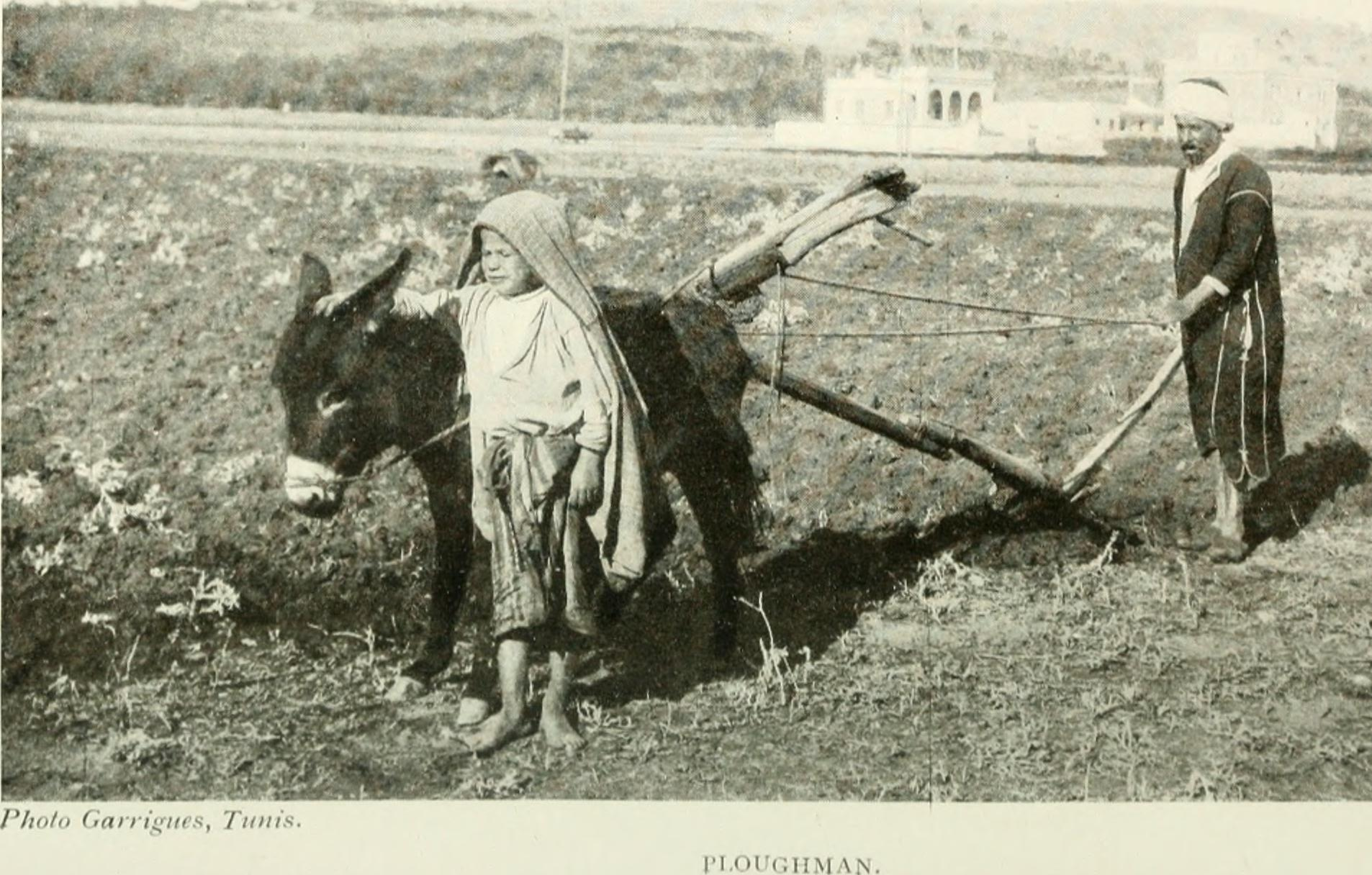
Hauling of an ard with a donkey. Photo taken near Tunis, 1906

The French protectorate was interested in rearing mules to supply to the army and sending French breeds of jacks, notably Pyrenean, Catalan and Savoyard breeds to stations in various breeding centres. Controlled reproduction attempts were undertaken in Sidi Thabet, where, starting from 1938, Catalan jennies were imported. This marked the start of the development of donkey breeding. The Catalan donkey is known to be able to easily adapt to the Tunisian climate, in contrast with the Baudet du Poitou. La Statistique générale de la Tunisie, written by Ernest Fallot in 1931, counted 168,794 donkeys belonging to Tunisians compared to 2,388 belonging to the French.

The donkey population then suffered a long decline as it was considered a relic of the past. However, the donkey population saw a large increase between 1966 and 1996, growing from an estimated 163 000 to around 230 000.

In the 1990s, the remote locations of some schools and a lack of public transport made the usage of donkeys, either for pulling carriages or for carrying pupils on their backs, an indispensable tool for ensuring school attendance. Donkey breeding also saw a significant comeback for the purpose of transporting contraband. In small Tunisian family farms, such as the famous example of Sidi Abid (2002), families preferred to purchase a donkey rather than a mule or a horse because the donkey is guaranteed to help with peasant work. However, the rural species has undergone noticeable changes since the 1990s as the transition from nomadism to sedentism led to the gradual disappearance of donkeys and mules as they were replaced by motorised vehicles. Sightings of this animal are now rare. In addition to this, an epizootic of equine influenza hit the country in 1998, particularly in the Tozeur region, starting from the end of the month of January, whose spread affected horses, mules and donkeys equally.

== Uses and practices ==
The donkey still plays a major role in domains such as transport for minor agricultural work, as well as in ground work. Known for their temperance and hardiness, donkeys are used by the poorest Tunisians to travel or to carry water with a pack saddle, a barda or a zembil. . They may be a necessity in subdesert regions and steppes in order to access water. Well-drilling zones can be up to several kilometres away from inhabited areas and transporting water is achieved either by a tank wagon made from tinplate supported by two wheels, or via amphora urns (or more recently, via plastic water containers) which are filled up and brought back by women on the backs of donkeys. The donkey is used less and less frequently in rural areas, reserved only for tasks such as gathering olives, with cars being used for day-to-day transport.

In Toujane, the traditional oil mill was previously run with the use of donkeys or with small dromedaries which were able to set in motion a stone base weighing approximately 150 kg.

The roads in the Tunisian Great South (2004) can vary dramatically and all types of vehicles run along them, such as bicycles, Mobylettes, cars, share taxis and donkey wagons. According to a source from 1979, the nomads of the Tunisian Great South had nicknamed the donkey "dàb er-rezg'' meaning "providential workhorse". They used the animal to pull the ard in the ghaba (gardens), to carry water or wood, and to accompany people during transhumance and when sowing seeds. As of 2011, it was still possible to see older women travel on the back of a donkey in the village of Tamezret. As of 2016, there were still a number of donkey wagons on the islands of Kerkennah.

Mules were traditionally kept for the same tasks as those of donkeys.

As of 2014, L'École supérieure des industries alimentaires de Tunis has been looking to promote the production and consumption of donkey milk, but its need to be refrigerated in order to preserve it poses a major problem.

=== Meat ===
Consumption of donkey meat is controversial; the majority of Tunisians claim to never eat it, but the rising prices of red meat (particularly in 2012 and 2013) could have encouraged a large number of people to consume it, especially in the month of Ramadan, which sees a sharp rise in the price of meat. According to comments made in 2017 by Mohamed Rabhi, the director for the protection of health in the Tunisian Ministry for Public Health, the sale of donkey meat in Tunisia is perfectly legal. According to official figures, the two Tunisian abattoirs authorised for equine animals produced 2000 tonnes of donkey meat in 2012. However, the actual number of donkeys killed per year is believed to be around 30,000, most often to be sold fraudulently, mainly to produce merguez or shawarma : due to the infrequency of checks, it is impossible to find out exactly where this fraudulent meat is sold. According to Le Muslim Post, horse meat is considered halal, whereas donkey meat is haram. Despite this, donkey meat is said to be consumed in the slums around Tunis.

== Culture ==
The Tunisian Arabic word for donkey is bhim. The donkey holds very negative cultural connotations, its name serving as the equivalent to an animal epithet to call someone stupid or indecisive. As such, the group Takriz, founded in 1998 with the objective of "fighting tyranny and Internet censorship in Tunisia", is frequently insulted by Tunisian internet users who refer to them as bhéyém (donkeys) or châab bhim (stupid people).

== See also ==
- The Donkey's Head – Jewish-Tunisian folktale
