= The Golden Crab =

Greek fairy tale

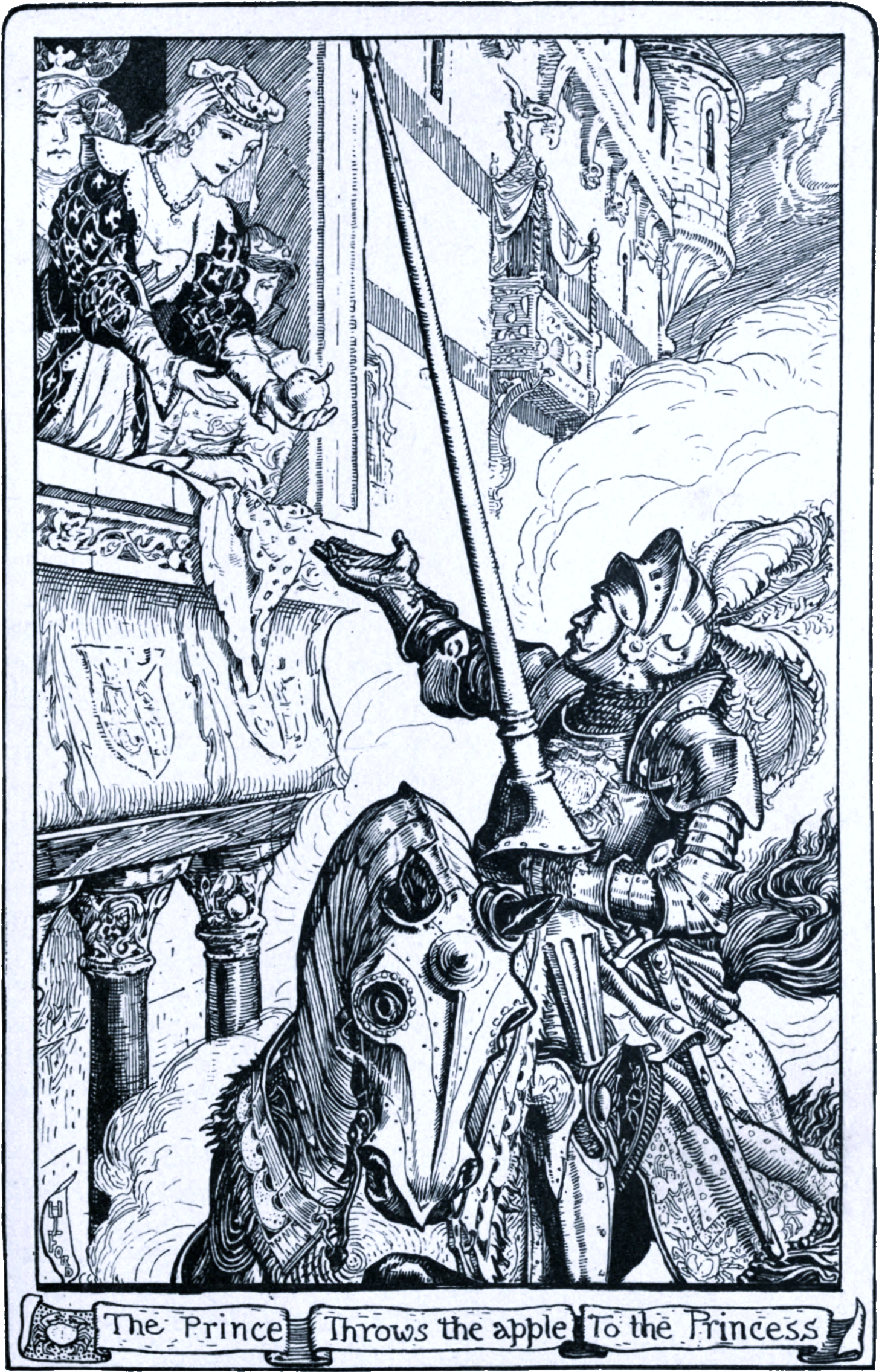
- The princess receives the apple from the gallant knight (her crab husband in human form). Illustration for The Yellow Fairy Book

Folk tale
- Name: The Golden Crab
- Also known as: Οἱ δώδεκα ἀετοί; Prinz Krebz
- Aarne–Thompson grouping: ATU 425D, "The Vanished Husband"
- Region: Greece
- Published in: Griechische Märchen, Sagen and Volkslieder by Bernhard Schmidt (1877)
- Related: The Donkey's Head; The Camel Husband

The Golden Crab is a Greek fairy tale collected as "Prinz Krebs" by Bernhard Schmidt in his Griechische Märchen, Sagen and Volkslieder. Andrew Lang included it in The Yellow Fairy Book.

Greek folklorist Georgios A. Megas collected a variant, The Crab, in Folktales of Greece.

The tale is related to the international cycle of the Animal as Bridegroom or The Search for the Lost Husband, in that a human princess marries a supernatural or enchanted husband in animal form, breaks his trust and he disappears, having to search for him. Specifically, the tale belongs to a subtype of the cycle, classified in the international Aarne-Thompson-Uther Index as tale type ATU 425D, "The Vanished Husband" (previously, "Vanished Husband learned of by keeping inn".

== Synopsis ==
=== Schmidt's variant ===
Bernhard Schmidt (de) stated that his version was originally titled "Οἱ δώδεκα ἀετοί" ("Oí dódeka áetoi"; "The Twelve Eagles") by the narrator. He also compared the 12 eagles of the Greek tale to the 12 pigeons in the Albanian tale from von Hahn.

One day, a fisherman, who had a wife and three children, caught a golden crab with the rest of his fish. He took it home, and the crab told his wife, (who was cleaning the other fish) to let down her skirt, her feet were showing. That evening, the crab asked to be given dinner, and when they did, they found his plate was filled with gold. This happened every night.

One day, the crab told the fisherman's wife to tell the king that he (the crab) wanted to marry his (the king's) younger daughter. The king, guessing he was an enchanted prince, demanded that the crab build a wall in front of the castle, higher than the highest tower, and blooming with flowers, and then a garden with three fountains that played gold, diamonds, and brilliants. When this was done, the king agreed.

The crab sent the fisherman to fetch rich garments for himself and his bride, and had himself carried to the castle on a golden cushion. After the wedding, he told his bride that he was an enchanted prince, a crab by day and a man by night, though he could change himself into an eagle whenever he liked. They spent their nights together, and soon the princess had a son.

The king held another tournament, decreeing that if any of the knights pleased his daughter, that knight would be selected by her, and she would marry him and would leave the crab. The method of selection was to be a golden apple - thrown to the king's daughter by whichever knight she selected. The crab sent the princess to give orders for his golden armor and steed, and his golden apple, to be brought to him. He warned her that he would be the knight to throw her the golden apple, but she must not reveal that he is the crab. When she was not pleased with any of the princes, the king held a second tournament. The crab was certain that his wife would betray him this time, but went again. When he threw her the golden apple, her mother boxed her ears, demanding to know why even that knight did not please her, and the princess confessed it was the crab. The queen ran back to their rooms, saw the crab shell, and burned it. The princess wept bitterly, but her husband did not return.

An old man went to dip some bread in water when a dog stole it from him. He chased after the dog, and found a palace. Twelve eagles flew in and became young men. They toasted the health of some family member—a father, a mother—and the last toasted his wife but cursed the mother who burned his shell. The old man heard the princess was ill, and that the only thing that consoled her was hearing stories. He went to the castle to tell his, and the princess went with him to the palace. When her husband gave that toast, she ran to him. He asked if she would stay with him the three months until the enchantment was done. She agreed and sent back the old man to tell her parents. They were not pleased, but when the three months were done, the prince and princess went back home and were happy.

=== Megas's variant ===
In Megas's tale, titled in Modern Greek: Ο κάβουρας, romanized: O kávouras, and translated as Der Krebs ("The Crab"), a priest and his wife lived near a king and queen. They were so fond of each other that they agreed that their children would marry. The queen gave birth to a daughter, and the priest's wife to a crab. When the crab and the princess were grown, the crab asked the king to fulfill his promise. The king asked him to remove a nearby mountain in one night. The crab did so, and the marriage was held. He took off his shell at night and became a handsome young man, but cautioned his wife to silence. The princess was pleased, but her mother was grief-stricken. On Sundays, the crab sent his wife to church ahead of him and came in human form; her mother said that the prince must have come to woo her and she lost him by marrying the crab. On the third Sunday, the queen wept so much that her daughter feared she would become ill, and the princess revealed the truth. When she went back, the crab was gone.

She had three pairs of iron shoes made and wandered the world until she had worn out two. Then she built an inn and asked all travellers for news. Two beggars came. One told how he had tried to eat some bread, but when he dipped it into a stream to soften it, the current bore it off. He had chased it to a palace, where he was forbidden to eat until the lords had eaten. Three doves flew in and turned to young men. Two toasted the health of a fair one who could not keep a secret, and ordered the windows and doors to weep; they wept, and the young men wept with them. The third toasted the fair lady who could not keep her promise for one more day, and wept with the windows and doors. When they were done, the beggar ate and left. The princess asked him to lead her there. The oven and cauldron welcomed her, and the door told her to hide behind it. When the first two men gave their toasts, the doors and windows wept, but when the third did, they laughed. He went to break them, and found his wife. She threw his wings on the fire and saved him from possible danger or death.

=== Kretschmer's variant ===
German linguist Paul Kretschmer collected a similar tale from the island of Lesbos with the title Die Krebs ("The Crab"), which was translated by Richard McGillivray Dawkins in his book Modern Greek Folktales. In this tale, a childless woman lives just before the palace. Seeing the children playing about, she declares she will have a child, even if it is a crab. So God gives her one. After the crab is born, she takes him to play with other human children, but their parents don't allow their children to play with him.

In time, the crab grows larger and larger. One day, the mother leaves home and returns later, only to find the kitchen clean. She pretends to leave the next day, and sees that a young man comes out of the crab shell to do the chores. The woman surprises him, and he confesses he is the crab, and convinces his mother to go to the palace and ask for the hand of the princess in marriage.

The woman goes to the king in her son's stead, and the king orders the crab to fulfill some tasks first: to build a palace, with a garden with all types of trees and fruits; and to have the Sun illuminate the garden. The crab fulfills both tasks, and his mother goes to the king's court to announce her son is to marry the king's daughter. The princess's sisters complain that she is marrying a crab, not a prince, but the princess answers that it is her fate.

The princess and the crab marry. One day, the whole kingdom is abuzz due to a festival or some such. The crab tells his wife he will take part in the competition as a human rider on a black horse, but she cannot tell anything to her sisters. He goes to the festival and returns home. Next, the crab comes in red clothes, and returns home. Every time, the princess's sisters mock her for her choice of husband. On the third day, the crab warns his wife that, this time, she will betray him, but she assures him she will not. At any rate, the crab goes to the festival as a man, and the princess, in a moment of pride, reveals the youth is her husband, the crab. The youth disappears.

The princess orders the construction of an inn and a tailor's workshop, where people can come, eat, tell stories and get finer clothes. One day, a blind man and his son Wohlan want to go to the inn. They walk a bit and stop by a river. The boy takes out a loaf of bread, but it slips from his hands and rolls out on the ground. The bread just keeps rolling, and the boy follows it until it stops near a palace. The boy enters the palace and sees three doves coming, becoming men and making a toast to someone.

The boy and his blind father go to the princess's inn and tells the whole story. The princess goes to the same castle and sees the three doves. The three birds become man and the third makes a toast to the one that betrayed him. The princess reveals herself and intends to release him from the "Drachin", although her husband says she cannot do so. Eventually, the princess faces off the Drachin, who makes her choose her husband, and she chooses the middle one.

== Analysis ==
=== Tale type ===
The tale is related to the cycle of the Animal as Bridegroom or the Search for the Lost Husband, and classified in the international Aarne-Thompson-Uther Index as type ATU 425D, "The Vanished Husband". This type refers to a human girl marrying a supernatural husband in animal form; she betrays his secret and he disappears. In order to find him, she builds an inn, hospital or bath house to listen to passers-by's stories. One day, she listens to a person's narration about a flock of birds transforming into men in a place somewhere. The heroine recognizes it is about her husband and asks to be taken there.

Similarly, Greek folktale scholars Anna Angelopoulou and Aigle Brouskou, editors of the Greek Folktale Catalogue, classified Schmidt's tale as type 425D, Kretschmer's as type 425D, and Megas's also as type 425D. American folklorist D. L. Ashliman classified tale The Crab as type 425D, "A wife finds her lost husband by keeping an inn".

=== Motifs ===
==== Fulfilling the king's tasks ====
Greek folklorist Georgios A. Megas noted it was "traditional" in Greek variants of type 425A (see below) and 425D for the animal husband to be adopted and fulfill the king's tasks before marrying the princess. In Hans-Jörg Uther's revision of the index, published in 2004, type ATU 425D involves a poor couple finding or adopting an animal son, who later fulfills the king's tasks before marrying the princess.

==== The husband's vanishing ====
Greek scholars Anna Angelopoulou and Aigle Broskou remark that the breaking of the taboo by the wife in this tale type involves revealing the husband's identity during a party or a tournament. Folklorist Georgios Megas adds that this motif, called "The Gossip Taboo", is "traditional" in type 425D in Greece, and involves the heroine telling her family about her husband after he attends a contest in the shape of a knight in differently coloured garments.

==== The husband's location ====
According to Georgios A. Megas, the main motif of the tale type is H11.1.1, "Recognition at inn [hospital, etc.], where all must tell their life histories". In the same vein, Swedish scholar Jan-Öjvind Swahn identified among the "motifs characteristic of subtype D" the bath-house, the inn, or places where the heroine goes to hear stories or news about her husband. In addition, in his study, Swahn determined that the bath-house as the location the heroine opens is "traditional" in Turkey, but also appears in Arabic, some Balkanic tales, and in a few Greek variants (in the latter along with the inn).

According to Richard McGillivray Dawkins, Greek tales "follow eastern ways" and "always" mention the bath house as the place the heroine builds to locate her husband. Later, Greek folktale scholars Anna Angelopoulou and Aigle Brouskou, editors of the Greek Folktale Catalogue, remarked that, after the husband vanishes, the heroine either buys or builds an inn or hospital, and invites people in to tell her stories. Marianne Klaar noted that the open bath house or free inn is an "extremely frequent" motif in Greek and Turkish fairy tales for the heroine to locate her missing spouse.

==== Other motifs ====
Some variants include the motif of the "rash promise" made by the heroine's father (also called "Jephthah's vow").

According to Emmanouela Katrinaki, in most Greek variants of type ATU 425D, the supernatural husband suffers a double metamorphosis: he starts the tale in a non-human shape (animal, vegetable or human head), and when the heroine betrays his trust, he transforms into a bird and flies away to join his companions in bird form (or the dragons or fairies).

== Variants ==
=== Europe ===
==== Greece ====
According to Emmanouela Katrinaki, Greek variants of type ATU 425E, Enchanted Husband Sings Lullaby, "almost always" appear in combination with type 425D. In the same vein, scholars Anna Angelopoulou and Aigle Broskou, editors of the Greek Folktale Catalogue, stated that subtype 425E is found in Greece "frequently combined" either with subtype 425A or subtype 425D. (Note: Greek type 425A corresponds to type ATU 425B, "Son of the Witch", of the international index.)

===== Beauty and the Swan =====
In a Greek tale translated as Beauty and the Swan, a nobleman and a miller are friends, marry on the same day to their respective wives, who are also best friends. So close are they to each other they promise to marry their children to each other. In time, the nobleman's wife gives birth to a girl they name Beauty, while the miller's wife gives birth to a swan. Beauty and the swan are fond of each other and play together, and the swan sends his father to remind the nobleman of their promises. The nobleman is downcast about the idea, and the miller's wife reminds that they made a vow before the statue of the Virgin Mary, so they cannot renege on their promise. Thus, Beauty marries the swan bird. On the wedding night, the swan reveals he is a handsome youth, then asks her to keep the secret for more fifteen days until the Fates's curse is lifted. Beauty agrees to keep the secret, but thinks about telling her mother about it. Beauty's mother falls ill as time passes, and after fourteen days Beauty visits her mother and whispers her husband's secret to her ear. Beauty's mother's health improves, but, as the swan husband predicted, he vanishes. Beauty's family tries to find the bird, but, on not finding him, Beauty asks for three pairs of iron-shod shoes and a bag of golden sovereigns, then departs to search for him. After wearing down the first pairs of iron shoes, she learns about two other youths who turned into swans, and opens an inn where people are to come and tell fantastic stories. After a year, a lame man and a blind man appear at the inn and tell a story: they were to dip their dried bread in water, when the stream carried the loaf away and they followed it to a waterfall that hid a door behind it; beyond the door, bread and soup were being prepared by magic utensils for their masters; in a nearby chamber, three swans fly in and turn into young men. Beauty asks the duo to take her to the room behind the waterfall. Beauty enters the room alone, and is greeted by the kitchen utensils until she reaches the room. The three swans fly in, take a dip in a pool, turn into young men and make a toast to their traitorous spouses, bidding the doors and windows to weep with them. The third young man, Beauty's husband, makes his toast and bids the doors and windows to cry with him, but they laugh instead. Beauty's husband leaves the chair to admonish the doors and windows, when Beauty appears, embraces her husband, and tosses the swan wings of the other two youths in a fire, to break their curse. The first two young men thank Beauty and vow to return to their respective beloveds, while Beauty takes her husband back to their parents.

===== The Elikandí, the Sugar-White =====
In a Greek tale from Rhodos translated as Die Elikandí, die Zuckerweiße ("The Elikandí, the Sugar-White"), a girl named Elikandí, a girl with skin white as sugar, thus her name "Sugar-White [Skin]", goes to hold a vigil for a sleeping prince by crying her tears in a barrel. She buys a Moor woman to keep her company, and forbids her to fill up the barrel next to the prince. While Elikandí leaves, the Moor woman sheds her tears, causing the prince to wake up. He sees the Moor woman and believes she is his saviour, but notices her dark skin and questions what happened to her. The Moor woman lies that her white skin darkened due to worry for crying by his side for the whole time. Still, he believes her and marries the Moor woman, while Elikandí is made as their servant. One day, the prince is going on a journey for work and asks the woman and Elikandí what they want as returning gifts; Elikandí asks for a kerchief of tears, the knife of slaughter, the stone of patience and the candelabra with seven wicks, cursing that the sea turns into glass to hinder his journey if he forgets such gifts. The prince departs, does his business, but the ship cannot move, so the captain blames one of the passengers for this. The prince realizes he is the reason for the ship not departing, disembarks to buy the gifts, then returns to the ship, which can finally sail. The prince gives Elikandí the four objects, which she displays in her room, sharing her woes with the kerchief that she is the prince's true saviour and bride, then bidding the knife to kill her, the candelabra to burn her, and the stone to get her. The prince suspects something about their servant and opens the door when he hears her words. He realizes Elikandí is his true love and they reunite. He expels the Moorish woman and marries the sugar-white girl. Sometime later, to take revenge for being rejected, the Moor woman takes some trinkets with her like jewels and baubles, and passes in front of the castle, pretending to be a seller. Sugar-White listens to the peddlar woman's singing and wants to buy something. A doll interests her, and the peddlar woman questions Sugar-White about her husband's name. Sugar-White does not know, so the Moor woman tells her to ask him. Back home, Sugar-White looks worried and tells the king's son about her question: to know his name. The king's son worries about Sugar-White's question, and advises her to prepare three pairs of iron shoes, tells his name is Polyete and bids her come looking for him if he vanishes. After uttering his name, the king's son vanishes. Sugar-White laments the situation, and dons the iron shoes to find her husband. After wearing down three pairs, she reaches a place where she decides to build a bathhouse, with a placard on the front: people can come and bathe for free if they have a story to tell. Sugar-White receives stories from many people, but still no sign of her husband. Until a farmer's wife and her son go to the bathhouse to bathe and retell a tale that happened one night to them: the farmer's wife's son was digging up in a field one night, when he found a trapdoor that led underground; he pulled the lever and went down forty-one steps to a chamber where a man was being fed by two slaves who called him Polyeté and were trying to comfort him by mentioning his beloved Elikandí. Elikandí realizes that the story is about her husband and asks the farmer's wife's young son to be taken to the underground chamber. The boy takes Elikandí to the steps and reunites her with Polyeté.

==== Italy ====
The "Istituto centrale per i beni sonori ed audiovisivi" ("Central Institute of Sound and Audiovisual Heritage") promoted research and registration throughout the Italian territory between the years 1968–1969 and 1972. In 1975 the Institute published a catalog edited by Alberto Maria Cirese and Liliana Serafini reported 5 variants of subtype 425D, under the banner Notizie del marito scomparso apprese aprendo una locanda (o un bagno) ("Hearing news about lost husband by opening an inn or bath house").

==== Albania ====
Austrian consul Johann Georg von Hahn collected an Albanian tale titled Taubenliebe: a king wants his only daughter to find a husband. One day, a dove flies into her room and talks to her. The dove tells her to have a milk bowl ready for it the next day. The dove returns, bathes in the milk and becomes a handsome youth. The youth warns her to never tell anyone about him, and to wait for him for three years. They exchange rings as a vow. Some time later, the queen wants to betroth the princess to a suitor, but she mentions she is already betrothed. After, the dove does not return, and she goes on a quest for him for three years, walking in iron shoes and with three iron canes. Her quest is not successful, and she returns home. She asks her parents to build a bath house, and that any guest can enter by telling a story. One day, the daughter of a woman that lives in town wants to go to the bath house, but first she goes to the fountain to get some water. At the spring, she sees a rooster with footwear. The girl follows the rooster to a garden and to a house. Inside the house, she spies on 11 pigeons flying into the room, bathing in milk and becoming men. A 12th pigeon appears and mopes about his fiancée, who betrayed the secret. The girl returns to her mother and both decide to go to the princess's bath house to tell her the story. The tale was translated by Angelo de Gubernatis as Il Principe Colombo ("The Pigeon Prince"); by Parker Fillmore as The Pigeon's Bride: The Story of a Princess who Kissed and Told (sourced as from Yugoslavia), and by Albanologist Robert Elsie as For the Love of a Dove. Greek folktale scholars Anna Angelopoulou and Aigle Brouskou, editors of the Greek Folktale Catalogue, classified Hahn's tale as type 425D.

==== Romania ====
Romanian folklorist Dumitru Stăncescu collected a Romanian variant titled Fratele bucăţică ("Brother Little Morsel"). In this tale, a carpenter and a mason are great friends and promise to unite their families by marrying their first born children to each other. The carpenter's wife gives birth to a girl, while the mason's wife gives birth to a morsel of meat. Despite their appearance, the morsel of meat does talk like a human being. Seeing his future son-in-law, the carpenter refuses to marry his daughter to the morsel, but the mason brings the demand to the Emperor, who forces the carpenter to uphold his word. Thus, his daughter is married to the morsel of meat. At night, in the bedchambers, the morsel of meat turns into a human being and tells his wife that he is cursed into that form, but she can help him break the curse if she does not say anything to anyone. Eventually, the girl lets slip the secret, and Bucăţică disappears. Meanwhile, next to a river, two beggars, a blind man and a lame man, bicker a bit for lost bread, until the lame man sees a palace in the distance. The pair goes to the palace, but no one seems to inhabit it. In one of the rooms, they see a table set with dishes. Suddenly, a window opens, and ten pigeons come in, become men and sit at the table, waiting for their brother Bucăţică. Bucăţică appears as a pigeon, turns into a man and sits at the table, but does not enjoy the food, for he still misses his wife. The men leave the table, the two beggars fetch the remaining food and leave. The beggars walk for two days until they reach a large bath house, where travellers come to take a bath and tell stories. The beggars are given a bath, a shave and new clothes, and go to talk to their hostess, Bucăţică's wife. They tell her about the palace with the 11 pigeons, and she asks to be taken there. The carpenter's daughter sees the pigeons and her husband, and goes to hug him.

==== Bulgaria ====
The Bulgarian Folktale Catalogue registers a similar narrative, indexed as type 425D, "Невяста научава къде е изчезналият й съпруг като отваря фурна, раздава хлеб срещу разказване на чудии преживелици" or "Eine Frau erfährt, wo ihr verschwundener Mann ist. Sie eröffnet ein Backhaus und gibt Brot für das Erzählen von wundersamen Erlebnissen" ("Bride learns of missing husband by opening bakery and offering bread in exchange for wondrous tales").

=== Asia ===
==== Iraq ====
In a dialectal variant from Baghdad with the title ich-chelb‿il-eswed ("The Black Dog"), a couple has no children, but the wife wishes to have a daughter, and makes a promise to marry her to whoever asks for her hand, even if it is a black dog. A daughter is born and 16 years later, a black dog appears to her to remind her of her mother's promise. The girl is given to the black dog as wife and they move to a new house. Once there, the black dog takes off the canine skin and becomes a handsome man. He gives her a casket of jewellery and tells his wife not to reveal the secret to any stranger. The girl goes to the women's bath and is insulted for marrying a dog, but she proclaims her husband is better than any of their husbands. Later that night, the girl awaits for her husband to come, but he never does, and she goes back to her mother. The girl asks her mother to build a bath house, where any guest may tell her news of her husband. One day, an old woman passes by the bath house and narrates a strange occurrence that happened to her: before dawn, on a moonlit night, she followed a camel to a house, where 40 birds alighted and became men, the last of them standing near a fountain with a piece of jewelry and laments over his lost love, the entire house weeping with him. The girl at the bath house begs the old woman to take her there where she saw the camel, the house and the birds. The event repeats and, when the last man laments over his lost love, the entire house laughs instead of weeping. His love, the girl, reveals herself and they reconcile. Scholar Hasan El-Shamy classified this tale as both type ATU 425A and type ATU 425D.

In an Iraqi tale collected by novelist and ethnologist E. S. Drower with the title The Thorn-Seller or Shawwāk, a poor thorn-seller brings home a gourd. Suddenly, the gourd begins to talk and tells the thorn-seller, whom he regards as his adoptive father, to court the king's princess as a wife for him. The thorn-seller goes to the king with his son's proposal, and the king orders him to build a palace made of gold and precious gems. With the gourd's magic powers, a palace is built. The king is convinced to give his daughter's hand in marriage to the thorn-seller's son. The princess awaits for her husband, but a sparrow comes to her room. The bird takes off the birdskin, reveals he is her husband and asks her not to reveal the secret. One day, she goes to a women-only public bath and overhears the mocking gossip about her marriage. She then tells the women about her husband's true form. Sensing his wife betrayed her vow, the bird steals some of her jewels as a memento, then flies away. Some time later, the princess builds a bath house where everyone can bathe for free in exchange for a tale. An old woman comes and tells a curious story: when she was going to the river to wash her clothes, she saw a rooster coming out of the river; she held onto the rooster's tail and was carried off to an underwater castle, inside, 40 doves came to a pool near the castle and became maidens, then a man came and cried over a lost love. The princess asks the old woman to guide her to the river. In her notes, Drower reported two similar tales. In the first, the supernatural husband is a white snake, whose snake skin the heroine's jealous sisters throw in the fire, and that the kitchen utensils cry with him. In a second story, a bird steals a princess's comb; the tale continues much like The Thorn-Seller: the woman at the river sees a stallion filling waterskins; then, inside the secret palace, the bird becomes a man, yearns with love for the princess, and bids the trees to weep with him. Scholar Hasan El-Shamy classified this tale, among other types, as type ATU 425D.

==== Israel ====
Scholar Heda Jason described a similar narrative, present in the Jewish Oriental tale corpus and which she named AaTh 425*Q, "Marvelous Being Woos Princess". According to her tale type, a son of supernatural origin (either adopted or born to human parents) instructs his parents to woo the princess; he marries the princess; due to some action by the princess, the husband disappears; some time later, a person follows a strange animal to an underground palace, where the supernatural husband is seen with other companions; the person relates the incident to the princess in her inn or bath house. In the same vein, folklorist Dov Noy abstracted a similar Jewish oikotype based on eight Jewish tales archived in the Israeli Folklore Archives (IFA) and on three Eastern European (Yiddish) tales. Doy's typing begins with a supernatural son that is born to a poor family and wants to marry the king's daughter; however, the king orders the would-be suitor to provide a dowry of gold and silver treasure for the princess and to perform tasks.

==== Kurdish people ====
Kurdologist Roger Lescot collected a tale from the Kurdish people with the title Çîroka Qundirê, translated into French as Conte de la Courge ("Tale of the Gourd"), into German as Der Kürbis ("The Gourd"), and into Russian by Kurdologist Margarita Rudenko with the title "Сказка о Тыкве" ("Tale of the Pumpkin"). In this tale, a poor herdsman and his wife live a cave away from the village. The woman gives birth to a gourd. The herdsman places the gourd on a shelf. One day. The gourd begins to talk to the man and convinces him to ask for the "daughter of the prince" as wife for him. The man goes to the prince to ask for his daughter's hand on behalf of his son. The prince orders the man to show up the next day with a cavalry of 40 men dressed in red garments. The gourd is informed of this and tells his father to go a certain rock and shout to an Ehmed Xan that his brother, Mhemmed Xan ("Mehmed Khan", in the German text), needs his help. The herdsman presents the prince the army and his daughter is given to the gourd. She rides a horse to meet the future husband. She is led inside the cave, while the couple leaves the cave. The gourd falls down the shelf and cracks open, and a handsome youth named Mhemmed Xan appears to his wife. He asks her to prepare him coffee without bubbling it, otherwise he will disappear. The princess forgets his request and he disappears. She wanders off to look for him in iron shoes, but to no avail. She then asks her father, the prince, to build a hotel in a seven-way crossroads, so that anyone might tell where they have seen Mhemmed Xan. One day, a blind man and his 7-year-old son stop to rest near a large rock. While the man sleeps, the large rock cracks open and the boy enters it. Inside, a large room with marble walls. Suddenly, 40 doves fly into the room, become men and repose on 40 couches. A youth with a gloomy expression strums his sitar, while a woman serves food for the 40 men, who become doves again and leave. The boy exits the marble room and continues his journey with his father. They reach the princess's hotel, where they stay the night. The princess listens to the boy's story and asks to be taken to the large rock. They enter the rock and she notices Mhemmed Xan's emaciated appearance. His mother tries to nudge him into eating some food, since for the past seven years he has been pining for a girl. As soon as his mother retires, the princess touches Mhemmed Xan. He tells her that his mother won't accept his marriage and that they have to escape. The leave the cave, but a rooster crows to the mother that her son escaped. Mhemmed Xan and the princess change into a shepherd (him) and a sheep (her), and into a miller (him) and a customer (her). The mother claims she will turn them to dust unless his wife is more beautiful than him. Mhemmed Xan shows his wife to his mother and she gives the couple her blessing. (Note: German scholar Hans-Jörg Uther, in his 2004 revision of the international index, listed Druzinina's translation of the Kurdish tale as a variant of tale type ATU 425D, "The Vanished Husband".) The tale was collected from a Kurdish tale teller named Osman Sebri, from the Heseman tribe.

Kurdologists Ordîxanê Jalîl, Celîlê Celîl and Zine Jalil collected another Kurdish tale in 1974 from informant Cherkes Ashir, from Yerevan, which was published in Russian with the title "Змееныш" ("The Little Snake"), and translated to German as Der Schlangensohn ("The Snake Son"). In this tale, a shepherd and his wife have longed to have a son, so God makes a snake crawl out of the wife's mouth as answer to their prayers. Time passes, and the little snake asks his father to make a bid for the hand of the padishah's daughter. The shepherd father goes to the padishah's court and sits on the matchmaking chair. The padishah laughs at the poor man's proposal, and confabulates with his viziers to set impossible tasks for the man that, if he fails, will result in his decapitation: first, he is to give him seven camels with loads on their backs, driven by an Arab man; second, to build a palace equal to the padishah's, and third, to unroll a carpet between the padishah's palace and the shepherd's house, with gardens on each side of the carpet and with nightingales singing. The snake son fulfills the requests, and gets to marry to the padishah's daughter. The padishah's daughter goes to the snake son's house and enter the bedroom: the snake son takes off the snakeskin and becomes a young man. Meanwhile, the padishah sends his wife to his son-in-law's house to see if his son is a snake. The padishah's wife is greeted by her daughter, who lies that her husband is away on a hunt. The padishah's wife spies behind a door the snake son-in-law take off the snakeskin; she seizes the opportunity to take the snakeskin and throw it in the fire. The young man laments the fact, warns his wife she will not find him until she hears from the 40 dervishes, becomes a bird and flies away. The padishah's daughter grieves for her lost husband, and her father-in-law and the padishah build her a "хератхан" ("Herathan"), where she welcomes travellers with food and bed, but they must share a story with her. One day, a blind father and his son named Ahmad go to fetch water, when the boy meets another boy named Ahmad, whom he befriends. The second Ahmad goes to a mountain, a rock door opens and asks if Ahmad brought the water to "forty dervishes". The boy answers yes, then goes out of the mountain. The first Ahmad goes back to his blind father, tells the whole story and both go to the padishah's daughter to tell her the occurrence. After listening to their story, she asks to be brought to the mountain where the rock opens. The padishah's daughter sees the second boy Ahmad and follows him through the rock door, meets her husband and embraces him.

==== Iran ====
In his Catalogue of Persian Folktales, German scholar Ulrich Marzolph located a similar tale from Azerbaijan region, in Iran, which he classified as a new Iranian type *425D, Tierbräutigam durch Geschichtenerzählen wiedergefunden ("Animal Husband found by telling stories"). In the single entry of the type, a princess falls in love with a blue bird; she builds a bathhouse, where a man named Kačal comes to tell a story about the location of her husband; the princess goes to her husband's location and kills the 40 fairies that kept him captive.

=== Africa ===
==== Egypt ====
In an Egyptian variant collected by Yacoub Artin Pacha with the title Les quarante boucs, ou le bouc chevauchant sur le bouc ("The 40 Goats, or, The Goat Riding a Goat"), a sultan has three daughters of marriageable age. He announces the princesses are to throw a handkerchief to their possible suitors who pass by their window. The two elders throw theirs to princes, while the third's falls near a goat. The princess repeats the action and her handkerchief still falls on the goat, to the crowd's amusement. The third princess marries the goat in a grand ceremony and leaves with him for their honeymoon. After the doors close, the goat takes off its skin and becomes a human youth of peerless beauty. He explains that he is an emir that was cursed by the sorcerers, and that she must not reveal the secret to anyone, otherwise he will disappear. Time passes, and war erupts. The princess's father, the sultan, is too old to fight, so he sends his three sons-in-law, the princes and the goat. His army victorious, the three sons-in-law return for a celebratory parade, and he third princess throws a rose to a mysterious man that rides along with the two princes. The parade continues on for two more days, and the princess throws a jasmine to the rider on the second day and a tamarind flower on the third. The princess's sisters suspect something afoul with their sister's behaviour and tell the sultan. The sultan confronts his daughter about it and she tells him about the goat's secret. The goat vanishes. The princess becomes saddened and builds a bath house, so that other women can share their woes with her. One day, a poor old woman comes to the bath house to share her story: she was washing herself in the river, when she saw three mules. She followed the mules, which descended through an opening into the ground to a grand room with 40 seats and a larger one. The old woman saw the arrival of 40 goats, plus a goat riding a goat; they sat on the seats and their skins peeled off to reveal 40 young men. The man sat on the larger seat cried over his love, "Princess of Beauty and Grace" (the heroine's name), and his companions, and the whole room, cried with him. After the old woman finishes her tale, the princess, named Sitt-el-Husna, asks to be taken there. The old woman takes the princess to the underground room; they see the same 40 goats enter, sit on the seats and take off their skins. The last goat enters, becomes a man and weeps over his lost love, but his companions and the room laugh, instead of crying with him. The princess appears before her husband and they reconcile. Orientalist J. C. Mardrus also included the tale as The He-Goat and the King’s Daughter in his translation of The Arabian Nights, later translated as Historia del Macho Cabrío y la Hija del Rey by novelist Vicente Blasco Ibáñez. Artin Pacha's tale was translated by author Ruth Manning-Sanders as The Forty Goats, in her book A Book of Charms and Changelings, and by James Ralph Foster as The Forty He-goats. Hasan El-Shamy classified this tale as types ATU 425A, 425C and 425D.

In an Egyptian tale collected from a source in Daqahliya, there are two monarchs, a childless sultan and a king with three daughters. The sultan laments that he has no children, and joins his wife in prayer for a son, even if he is a camel. A camel is thus born to them, which he feeds with delicious treats. One day, they bring food for the camel, but he refuses to eat. The sultan consults with the king about the camel son's loss of appetite, and the sultan deduces the camel must be wanting to get married. The king questions who would marry the camel son, and the sultan chooses the king's eldest daughter, the princess. The king rebuffs the idea, but, after much insistence of the sultan's part, the monarchs marry their scions. At one time, the princess announces she wants to go to the bath house. An old woman intercepts her to ask about her decision to marry a camel. The princess, in a rage, curses the camel's mother, his father, and his entire family. The camel husband turns into a man, follows her, overhears her harsh words, and kills her. The camel returns home and is offered food to eat, but remains apathetic. The sultan goes to talk with the king and they agree to marry the second princess. The middle princess marries the camel and goes to the bath house. The same old woman intercepts her and questions her about marrying the camel. The second princess, in a fit of fury, curses the camel husband's parents and family. The camel husband kills the second princess for this. Lastly, the sultan goes to talk to the king about marrying the third daughter to the camel son. The monarchs agree. The youngest princess goes to the bath house and she meets the old woman. The princess shushes the old woman about any harsh words towards the camel husband, and praises her husband, declaring that one day he will rule the country. The camel husband does not kill the third princess. Sometime later, war breaks out with another country, and the camel husband dons a knight disguise to fight in his father-in-law's name. He injures his leg, and returns to the woman, who washes the wound, and borrows a shawl from the neighbours to dress the wound. The human camel's injury is healed, and his wife washes the shawl. The camel returns home to his wife and accuses her of loving someone else, after seeing the shawl. The princess replies that she loves only her dear camel. Despite this, the camel husband shakes his head, and vanishes. After losing her husband, she opens a bath house, for women to come and share their secrets. A woman appears with her daughter, Bani, and comments that she followed a rooster loading firewood onto a camel, which bade them to follow it; they entered a place and the camel set up food and drink for them, but when they tried to touch it, the pot shouted that they should wait for the master. The camel then produced a comb - which belongs to the princess -, admired its crafstmanship, and wept over it, bidding the house to cry with him. The princess then asks the woman to take her to the place of the rooster and the camel. The woman shows the princess the strange sight of the rooster on the camel and the trio (the princess, the woman and Bani) follow the animal. The camel sets up plates for someone, and the princess goes to eat some. The kitchenware begins to talk and command themselves to open up for their mistress. The camel husband then takes the princess's comb and cries over it, bidding "soldiers and officers" to cry with him. However, the house and everything begin to laugh instead. The camel husband holds a sword to his own throat and threatens to kill himself, when the princess appears before her husband. The princess asks him if he was the traitor from the war, and the camel husband reveals that the princess's father cast a spell to conjure up another man for her. Reunited at last, the princess and the camel husband live in happiness and have many sons and daughters. Hasan El-Shamy classified this tale as types ATU 425A, 425C and 425D.

==== Libya ====
Philologist Ester Panetta collected a Libyan tale in the Libyan Arabic language, titled ’Alä hādâk el-kẩlb (Italian: Intorno a quel cane; English: "About a certain dog"). In this tale, a sultan's daughter buys a magic mirror from a Jew and peers into it to discern her future: her destiny is with a dog that passes by the garden. The princess asks the dog to be brought before her. At night, the dog takes off the canine skin and reveals himself to be a handsome youth, who climbs into her bed, then puts on the dog skin in the morning. This goes on for the next six days. On the seventh day, the princess's mother asks her about her daughter's behaviour, and decides to investigate: in the seventh night, the sultan's wife spies on the dog becoming a youth, then steals the dogskin and burns it. The following morning, the now human dog youth cannot find his disguise, and decides to depart to regions unknown. After he leaves, the princess wakes up and cannot find her lover. Some time later, the princess gathers people to tell stories in search of her lover. An old man comes and says that, one night, he saw a ship come ashore with a dog inside; the dog turned into a man and uttered some sad verses; then takes three apples and dedicates them to the east, to the west, and lastly, to the princess herself, his lost love. On hearing this, the princess asks to be taken to the same shore, and reunites with her lover.

==== Seychelles ====
In a Seychellois tale titled Krab Lor ("The Golden Crab"), collected from an informant named Jessie Hossen, a fisherman lives with his wife and their three children, and he sells his catch to the king. One day, the fisherman catches some fishes and a crab which he keeps it home while he sells the fishes to the king. When he returns home, he notices that the crab shines like gold. One day, the fisherman's wife goes to descale some fishes and ties her skirt around her waist, which the crab comments on. Annoyed, the woman places the crab on a plate on the table. The fisherman goes to eat with his wife and the crab asks for some food. The woman goes to fetch the plate the crab ate from and finds golden coins. The couple notice the crab leaves golden coins for them, and become rich with time. Sometime later, the golden crab asks the fisherman's wife to court the local king's youngest daughter on his behalf. The woman goes to the castle and explains the crab's proposal. The king agrees to their marriage, but requests a wall to surround the castle where flowers are in bloom. The woman returns to the crab, who gives her a golden staff to use on a certain place to create the wall. Next, the king asks for three fountains to be built on his garden: a golden one, a diamond one, and one made of brilliant stars - the fisherman's wife beats the staff on an area of the garden and creates the fountains. The king agrees to marry the princess to the golden crab. The golden crab then sends the woman to the mountain with the golden staff to summon a servant and ask for a richly decorated royal cloak and a golden pillow for him. The crab is carried on the pillow and gives the cloak to the princess. On the wedding night, the golden crab tells his wife he is a prince, the son of the greatest king in the world whom a sorcerer turned to a crustacean, and that he can assume human shape at night and crustacean shape by day by wearing the crab shell, but can also turn to an eagle. He then turns to human form, but returns in the morning to the crab shell. The princess loves the golden crab husband, to the royal family's worry, and she gives birth to a son named Benjamin after a year.

The king then says he will organize a tournament and invite the princes for her to choose a proper husband. The princess tells her husband about it and he sends her with a branch to the castle doors, hit the branch on the ground, summon a black-clad person and ask for is master the golden armour, the silver sword and the silver apples. It happens thus; the crab husband takes on human form to attend the tournament, where he will give her the silver apples, but she is not to tell anything to her family. After the first tournament, the princess is given the silver apples by the mysterious knight, and says none of the princes pleased her, so the king organizes a second tournament. For the second tournament, the crab husband sends his wife to get his equipment and a golden apple, and tells his wife this time she will betray him. During the tournament, the crab husband, in the knightly disguise, gives the golden apples to his wife by a window. The queen slaps her daughter's head and questions her lack of interest in the knight, then she confesses that the knight is her crab husband. The queen, furious at this revelation, rushes to her daughter's rooms, finds the crustacean shell and burns it. By doing so, the crab husband does not return home. Elsewhere, an old man goes to a river to dip his piece of bread, when a dog comes out of the water, steals the bread and runs away. The old man chases after the dog to a house, then to some stairs that lead underground. In the underground, the old man finds himself in a large room and hides behind a large portrait when he hears people coming. Suddenly, twelve eagles fly in, dive in a basin, become humans and sit for a meal. The youths rise their golden cups to toast for someone, and the last one toasts for his beautiful wife, but curses her mother that burned his shell. The youths then dive in the basin, become eagles, and fly away. The old man decides to go to the princess to report the events, since she has been sick and likes to hear stories. The old man retells about the underground palace and the twelve youths and the princess asks to be taken there. At the palace, the princess and the old man watch as the eagles fly in and become princes, who sit at the table and make their toasts. The princess recognizes the last prince as her husband and goes to embrace him, who reminds her of the day he told her she would betray him, and asks her to stay with him for three months until he is redeemed of the curse. The princess sends the old man back to inform the king and queen, who are angered at their daughter. After three months, the princess and the prince return home.

=== America ===
==== Chile ====
In a Chilean tale from the Maule Region, collected from an informant named Isolina Faúndez, in Ramadillas de Lircay, with the title El culebrón encantado ("The Enchanted Snake"), a king and queen have a son that lives inside a snakeskin due to a witch's sorcery. One day, when he is older, he tells the monarchs he wishes to be married, but there are not available ladies for him. The king remembers he has a servant with three daughters, and sends for his elder one. The elder girl goes to the castle and offers to marry the prince, but, on seeing him in the shape of a large snake, rejects him. For this, he kills the girl, and the monarchs bury her in secret to hide her death from her father. Some time later, the snake prince asks his father for the second daughter, who is also brought to the castle and offered to marry the prince, but rejects his snake form and he kills her. Finally, the snake prince asks for the third daughter, who is brought to the castle. Before she meets the prince, the queen asks her to have a bowl with water ready for him when he arrives. The girl leaves a bowl with water for him in their bedroom, the snake enters and declares her to be his bride, to which she consents. They spend the night together, and the snake leaves in the morning. One day, the witch who enchanted the prince pays her a visit and says the snake is a handsome prince, and she has to feign sleep and uncover him ("destápelo", in the original) to better see him. That same night, the girl goes to bed and waits for the snake to come. When he is asleep, she open her eyes and removes the bedsheets, finding a handsome youth besides her. The prince wakes up and admonishes his wife for breaking his trust; he dons his snakeskin again and curses his wife to sleep and not utter a word until an old woman comes to tell her stories, only then can she go after him, and vanishes. The girl lies in bed all day long, and the monarchs pay people to tell her stories, to no avail. One day, an old woman learns of the situation and wants to reach the palace where she can gain some coin. However, when she stops to rest and takes out some "tortillas", the food rolls down the path and she follows them to a large castle: inside, the utensils move by themselves and there are bowls of water in the room where the kings make court; three turtledoves ("tortolitas") come to bathe in the water bowl and become queens, followed by four goldfinches ("jilgueritos") that become kings. The kings and queens pair up, save for the fourth one, who laments his beloved wife is not there with him. The old woman rushes to the castle to tell the princess about the events she witnessed, and she regains her voice, asking the old woman to take her to this castle. The pair reach the castle and watch as the utensils move by themselves and the birds become people, just like before. When the fourth person laments his lost love, the princess declares she is there to be with him. The now human snake prince reunites with his wife and lives in the castle, while the other couples become birds and fly away.

== See also ==
- Hans My Hedgehog
- The Brown Bear of Norway
- Prince Crawfish
- Princess Himal and Nagaray
- The Tale of the Woodcutter and his Daughters
- The Little Crab
- The Donkey's Head
- The Donkey's Head (Turkish folktale)
- Saint Passaway
