= The Donkey's Head =

Jewish-Tunisian folktale

Folk tale
- Name: The Donkey's Head
- Aarne–Thompson grouping: ATU 425D, "The Vanished Husband"
- Region: Jewish-Tunisian
- Published in: Revue des Traditions Populaires by Alice Fermé (1893)
- Related: The Golden Crab; The Camel Husband

The Donkey's Head (French: La Tête d'Âne) is a Jewish-Tunisian folktale collected by author Alice Fermé and published in the French journal Revue des Traditions Populaires, in late-19th century.

The tale is related to the international cycle of the Animal as Bridegroom or The Search for the Lost Husband, in that a human princess marries a supernatural or enchanted husband in animal form, breaks his trust and he disappears, having to search for him. Specifically, the tale belongs to a subtype of the cycle, classified in the international Aarne-Thompson-Uther Index as tale type ATU 425D, "The Vanished Husband".

== Summary ==
A poor old woman decides to try her luck by spending the night in an apparently haunted magasin (storeroom), since if she is still alive by dawn she will have the storeroom for herself. At a certain time of the night, a donkey's head appears to her; she invites it closer and the donkey's head thanks her, saying it is a sultan's son cursed by his enemies for loving a young lady. The old woman is still alive by morning light and gains the storehouse, and lives with the donkey's head.

The donkey's head asks the old woman to go to the town's sultan and ask for the hand of his youngest daughter in marriage. The old woman produces a box of expensive jewels as her dowry and the sultan's daughter becomes interested in marrying a rich donkey's head. The girl follows the old woman to her storehouse and becomes disappointed when she sees the humble store. She begins to cry, but a young man wearing a robe of emeralds appears, embraces her and leads the women to a table filled with the finest dishes. He explains that this secret can only stay between them, and that the sultan's daughter must lie to anyone of her family that her married life is a poor one, otherwise he will disappear. And so it happens for some time.

One day, the prince tells his wife an enemy army will invade the kingdom, but he will fight for her father's army in ruby garments. He joins the war and defeats the enemy army. When the army and the mysterious rider march in during the victory parade, the sultan's daughter reveals the mysterious rider is her husband. He disappears; the sultan's daughter becomes ill and the old woman at the storehouse delivers her to her parents.

Meanwhile, in another country, another poor woman is blown away by a fierce gust of wind and reaches another place near the sea. A man appears to her and they bathe in the sea. When night comes, they seek shelter in a manor, where a richly dressed man cuts an apple in four pieces, offering each of them to a person: his father, his mother and to someone who is far away. He then pleads the manor to weep with him, the doors, the ceiling and the tables. The second old woman learns about the sultan's daughter's illness and pays her a visit. After being paid, she tells her the story and the sultan's daughter asks to be taken to the manor. Both women see the man cutting the apple, but, when he begs the entryway to weep, it laughs and announces that his wife is there. The man sees her and embraces her.

== Analysis ==
=== Tale type ===
The tale is related to the cycle of the Animal as Bridegroom or the Search for the Lost Husband. Swedish scholar Jan-Öjvind Swahn, in his work about the cycle, classified the tale as subtype D. In the international Aarne-Thompson-Uther Index, the tale is classified as type ATU 425D, "The Vanished Husband". This type refers to a human girl marrying a supernatural husband in animal form; she betrays his secret and he disappears. In order to find him, she builds an inn, hospital or bath house to listen to passers-by's stories. One day, she listens to a person's narration about a flock of birds transforming into men in a place somewhere. The heroine recognizes it is about her husband and asks to be taken there.

However, scholar Heda Jason described a similar narrative, present in the Jewish Oriental tale corpus and which she indexed as type AaTh 425*Q, "Marvelous Being Woos Princess". According to her tale type, a son of supernatural origin (either adopted or born to human parents) instructs his parents to woo the princess; he marries the princess; due to some action by the princess, the husband disappears; some time later, a person follows a strange animal to an underground palace, where the supernatural husband is seen with other companions; the person relates the incident to the princess in her inn or bath house. In the same vein, folklorist Dov Noy abstracted a similar Jewish oikotype based on eight Jewish tales archived in the Israeli Folklore Archives (IFA) and on three Eastern European (Yiddish) tales. Noy's typing begins with a supernatural son that is born to a poor family and wants to marry the king's daughter; however, the king orders the would-be suitor to provide a dowry of gold and silver treasure for the princess and to perform tasks.

=== Motifs ===
==== The enchanted bridegroom ====
According to researcher Samia Al Azharia Jahn, a character that appears in variants of tale type 425 and its cycle is a donkey's head (Arabic: Rās al homār) as the form of the enchanted husband. The donkey's head is found and adopted by an old woman, who courts the sultan's daughter on his behalf; on the wedding night, he reveals himself to be a handsome man.

==== The husband's location ====
According to Georgios A. Megas, the main motif of the tale type is H11.1.1, "Recognition at inn [hospital, etc.], where all must tell their life histories". In the same vein, Swahn identified among the "motifs characteristic of subtype D" the bath-house, the inn, or places where the heroine goes to hear stories or news about her husband.

== Variants ==
=== Jewish-Tunisian tales ===
==== The Story of the Donkey's Head (Sadeh) ====
Israeli author Pinchas Sadeh translated a Tunisian tale as The Story of the Donkey's Head: an old woman is walking somewhere, when a talking donkey's head appears to her and asks to be taken to her house. The woman agrees and she finds a silver coin next to the donkey's head every day. Later, the donkey's head asks the woman to go to the king and ask for the princess's hand in marriage. Despite her concerns, the woman goes the first time, and gains one hundred leashes on her. The donkey's head pleads for her to go again, and again she receives a harsh leashing. The third time, the king relents and agrees to her proposition, but orders three simultaneous tasks: for donkey's head to provide 500 camels carrying 500 chalices of gold, 500 serving maidens carrying 500 baskets of fine clothing, and to build a palace larger than the king's. Donkey's head fulfills the king's orders and marries the princess. They live like husband and wife, him becoming a youth at night and a donkey's head in the morning. One day, the princess is invited to her sister's wedding, and asks her husband to go there. The donkey's head allows her to go, but advises her to keep quiet about his true nature. The princess attends her sister's wedding, and is asked about her husband. So pestered is she that she tells the old women everything about the donkey's head. They convince her to burn the donkey's head, since he takes it off at night. The princess follows their suggestion after she returns home and burns his donkey's head at night. The next morning, he discovers his disguise was destroyed and says he is "in great danger". The princess tries to make him stay, but he vanishes. She then returns to her parents' castle to live out her sorrow. Meanwhile, in a certain village, another old woman kneading dough sends her daughter to the baker for some dough. She returns with some, but a strong wind blows it out of her hands. She follows it and finds a camel washing dishes. Marvelling at the sight, she follows the camel to a house, where he magically prepares the room and sets a table for a meal; then, three men appear to dine, and one of them cuts an apple in four, offering pieces to his companions and a fourth to a lost love; lastly, he commands the house and his companions to weep with him. The woman's daughter sees the whole scene, and goes back to her mother, and both decide to go to the palace to tell the princess they may have found her husband. The girl and her mother tell the princess, and the girl asks the princess to come with her to the place. The girls follow the camel to the mysterious house and hide themselves, watch the whole scene repeat before their eyes, up until the moment the man commands the house to weep with him. Suddenly, he hears a laughter, and goes to check on it: it is the princess, his wife. They reunite and reconcile, and celebrate a new wedding in the palace. The tale was originally collected by Israeli folklorist Dov Noy with the title "ראש–חמור שביקש לשאת בת-מלך לאשה" ("The Ass-head who wanted to Marry the Princess"), and archived as IFA 2045 in the Israeli Folktale Archive (IFA).

==== The Donkey's Head (Koskas) ====
In a Jewish-Tunisian tale published by author Sonia Koskas with the title La tête d'âne ("The Donkey's Head"), a poor old woman, widow and childless, earns her living by begging for alms. One day, she finds a donkey's head by her door, and the thing asks to be brought in. Afraid, she brings it in, and the head says the woman will not have to beg anymore. Its words prove true when the old woman finds a golden coin under her foot. This goes on for some time, until the donkey's head asks the old woman to go to the sultan's palace and court his eldest daughter, princess Zoubeïda, on his behalf. The old woman is apprehensive at first, but the donkey's head assures she has nothing to fear. So, she goes to the palace and makes a proposal in name of the donkey's head. The sultan mocks her and orders her to be given a beating with a baton. She goes back home and complains to the donkey's head. Some time later, the donkey's head asks her to propose on his behalf again, and again she is given a harsh beating. The donkey's head asks her to go a third time, and this time the sultan, advised by his viziers, in order to dissuade the woman, asks her to produce a hundred red camels and a hundred white she-camels, the male camels guided by beautiful white slaves and the she-camels guided by beautiful black female slaves, and for him to build a palace for the princess overnight. The woman returns home and donkey's head tells her to fetch him a golden platter, a turban and a diamond pin. The next morning, the woman grooms the donkey's head and places it on the golden platter, decorates it with the turban and the pin, and travels to the sultan's palace with the slave retinue and the camels. The donkey's head announces its presence to the sultan, having produced the camels, slaves and palace as wedding gifts for the princess. The sultan does not believe his eyes at first, but, since a promise is a promise, he concedes and consents to their marriage. On the wedding night, the donkey's head becomes a handsome youth and spends the night with the princess, who keeps his true identity a secret. After three months, the princess's sister is marrying. The donkey's head allows her to attend the wedding, but she is to only utter the words "I am very happy". She goes to the wedding, and her female relatives begin to pester her with questions and sarcastic remarks, and the princess, annoyed at this treatment, reveals he is a human youth underneath the disguise, cursed by a ghoula (ogress) for refusing to marry the ghoula's daughter. Her relatives then advise her to burn the donkey disguise. That same night, she returns home to her husband and burns the donkey's head. He wakes up and admonishes her for having betrayed him, since if she kept silence for a few more months, his curse would have been lifted, then disappears. Princess Zoubeïda enters a state of mourning so deep she falls into a torpor. Meanwhile, the princess's sister, suffering for her elder's sorrow, goes for a walk near a fountain, and sees a camel washing dishes, then placing it a basket. The princess's sister follows the camel and grabs its tail; the camel then begins an aerial journey to a desert, since the animal is a jenn. The camel lands near a mansion, enters it and commands the wind to sweep the place and the rain to wash the floor. Then a table suddenly appears and sets by itself with dishes and drinks, three youths appear for a meal. After the meal, the youngest of the three youths fetches a pomegranate and slices it in 4 pieces, the fourth piece he dedicates to his lost love, the princess, by declaring that if the princess eats the pomegranate, his curse will be lifted, but in three days' time he is to marry the ghoula's daughter. After the meal, they disappear, and the same camel puts the tableware away. The princess watches the whole scene and rushes back home. The next day, the princess follows the camel and the events repeat like the day before. On the third day, however, the princess follows the camel and distracts it by knocking down a pile of stones. While the camel goes to fix it, she steals the pomegranate and hurries back home to her elder sister. She cuts open the fruit and feeds its seeds to Zoubeïda. Slowly, she regains her movements and opens her eyes. Finally, after she eats the last three pieces, a cry is heard in the distance, and her husband appears to her, having been saved from his curse.

=== Other tales ===
In a tale from a female teller from Tunis collected by Monia Hejaiej with the title The Donkey's Head, a poor old woman lives in poverty. One day, when she is preparing her own food at sunset, a donkey's head appears to her, with which she shares her meal. The donkey's head leaves her a purse full of gold. This event repeats itself many times until the old woman finds enough money to build herself a new home, and buy a cushion for the donkey's head. One day, the donkey's head asks the woman to court the local sultan's daughter on his behalf, but she refuses to do so, fearing for her life. Still, the donkey's head insists and she goes on an ornate carriage he summoned for her. She goes to the sultan's palace to make a bid for the princess's hand on behalf of the head, but she is beaten ip and expelled. The following week, donkey's head reiterates his request, and this time the old woman is to offer to fulfill any requests the sultan and his family may want. The old woman goes back to the palace, and this time, the queen, the princess and a maidservant each want extravagant wedding gifts: jewel boxes filled with jewels, pearls and emeralds, hundreds of slaves carrying baskets with silk and cosmetics, and a playing orchestra, for the following Thursday. The woman goes back home and tells donkey's head about the requests. On the appointed date, the queen peers into the window and sees the slaves, the orchestra and the jewel boxes, to her surprise. The sultan consents to marry the princess to donkey's head, but he will only appear to her at midnight. They agree to his terms, and leave the princess alone in a room to wait for her husband. The donkey's head comes through a tunnel, takes off his animal disguise and becomes a handsome youth. The youth makes his wife promise to keep a secret, and they spend seven days in bliss. Some time later, the vizier's daughter wishes to discover the donkey's head's secret, and pays the princess a visit in her new home. She pretends to retire to her quarters, but spies on donkey's head coming and taking off the skin. While he and the princess go to their chambers, the vizier's daughter takes the animal disguise and throws it in a fire. The human donkey's head senses he has been betrayed and vanishes, while the vizier's daughter flees back to the palace. As for the princess, when she wakes up the next morning, her husband, her palace and slaves have vanished overnight, so she returns to her father's home to mourn for her husband. One day, a bedouin from the old woman's village comes to the princess with a story: she saw the water in the river part and a camel appeared; she grabbed its tail and arrived at a palace; she hid herself, and saw a king, a queen, and a youth with a face half-burnt come to dine and discuss about someone. After hearing the story, the princess asks the bedouin to be taken to the river. She reaches the same river and waits for the camel; after it appears, she trails behind it to the secret palace and sees the monarchs and her husband discussing about her. The prince walks out of the table to stroll through the palace, when the princess appears to him, begging for forgiveness. He tells her to stay with the old woman, for he will build a tunnel connecting his palace to her house, and the princess is to visit him in his underwater palace until he recovers, then she is to meet his parents. The princess agrees to his terms, and visits him through the tunnel. When he has recovered enough strength, she meets her parents-in-law and asks them to return her husband. The monarchs agree and say she must continue her visits until his spell is broken. Time passes; the donkey's head spell is broken and he goes to live with his wife for good.

== See also ==
- The Golden Crab
- Donkeys in Tunisia
- The Donkey (fairy tale)
- The Padisah's Youngest Daughter and Her Donkey-Skull Husband
- The Donkey's Head (Turkish folktale)
- Sea-Horse (Syrian folktale)
- The Camel Husband
