= The Tale of the Woodcutter and his Daughters =

Egyptian folktale about an animal bridegroom

The Tale of the Woodcutter and his Daughters (German: Die Geschichte von dem Holzhauer und seinen Töchtern) is an Egyptian folktale that deals with the marriage between a human maiden and a bridegroom of supernatural origin who hides under an equine disguise; she betrays his trust, and has to search for him.

It belongs to the international cycle of the Animal as Bridegroom or The Search for the Lost Husband, wherein a human princess marries a supernatural husband, loses him, and goes on a quest to find him. It mostly follows subtype ATU 425D, "The Vanished Husband", which segues into tale type ATU 425B, "The Son of the Witch", thus distantly related to the Graeco-Roman myth of Cupid and Psyche, in that the heroine is forced to perform difficult tasks for a witch or the supernatural husband's mother - subtypes of the more general type ATU 425, "The Search for the Lost Husband".

== Sources ==
German orientalist Enno Littmann collected this tale from an informant named Maḥmûd, who heard the story in Giza.

== Summary ==
A poor woodcutter finds a horse drinking rosewater and eating almond nuts. To his surprise, the horse defecates money. The woodcutter becomes rich, buys a palace and marries his two elder daughters to princes, while the youngest prefers the company of the strange horse. The horse gives her beautiful, gem-encrusted garments to wear at her sisters' weddings, which draws the attention of the queen. The woodcutter's youngest daughter betrays the horse's secret and he departs.

The girl, named "Herrin der Schönheit und Anmut" ("Mistress of Beauty and Grace"), falls into a state of despair, and her father opens a public bath house for everyone to share stories. One day, an old spinner and her daughter go to the bath house and tell the girl about a strange scene: on a certain night, she saw a rooster screaming, and a man on a ship lamenting over a betrayed secret. The girl asks to be taken to that place. The three women arrive, and see a hen singing a joyous tune, while the man appears on his ship, still lamenting over his secret. The girl goes to him and asks for his forgiveness. He explains he is a king, and that his mother wants to marry him to a princess.

The man then takes the human girl to meet his mother. He tells her she is a servant, and the mother forces the girl to do chores for her son's upcoming wedding: to separate a heap of mixed cereals (beans, wheat, corn and barley) and to clean her palace with a beaded cloth and a broom decorated with pearls and emeralds. For the first task, the king whistles and the birds come to separate the cereal grains for her, and commands his servants to clean the palace instead of her. His mother later talks to him in private about the girl, and he reveals the whole story. The mother admits that, if he loves her, and she loves him, she sees no problem in signing the marriage contract between them. They celebrate their wedding.

== Analysis ==
=== Tale type ===
The tale is related to the cycle of the Animal as Bridegroom or the Search for the Lost Husband (tale type ATU 425). Scholar Hasan M. El-Shamy classified the tale, according to the international Aarne-Thompson-Uther Index, as types ATU 425B, "The Son of the Witch", and ATU 425D, "The Vanished Husband".

In tale type ATU 425D, "The Vanished Husband", after betraying her supernatural husband's secret, she builds an inn, hospital or bath house to listen to passers-by's stories. One day, she listens to a person's narration about a flock of birds transforming into men in a place somewhere. The heroine recognizes it is about her husband and asks to be taken there.

Type ATU 425B, "The Son of the Witch", is considered by scholarship to correspond to the ancient Graeco-Roman myth of Cupid and Psyche, that is, the supernatural husband's mother forces the heroine, her daughter-in-law, to perform difficult and impossible tasks for her.

=== Motifs ===
==== The husband's location ====
According to Greek folklorist Georgios A. Megas, the main motif of tale type 425D is H11.1.1, "Recognition at inn [hospital, etc.], where all must tell their life histories". In the same vein, Swedish scholar Jan-Öjvind Swahn identified among the "motifs characteristic of subtype D" the bath-house, the inn, or places where the heroine goes to hear stories or news about her husband. In addition, in his study, Swahn determined that the bath-house as the location the heroine opens is "traditional" in Turkey, but also appears in Arabic, some Balkanic tales, and in a few Greek variants (in the latter along with the inn).

==== The horse bridegroom ====
According to researchers Samia Al Azharia Jahn and Ayten Fadel, the supernatural bridegroom may appear as a horse, a goat or a camel in Arab variants. Likewise, scholar Jan-Öjvind Swahn asserted that the animal or supernatural husband appears as a horse in tale type 425A "in the Orient". In addition, Swahn identified a motif he named "favourite horse desires the king's daughter", which he associated with his type A. (Note: In Swahn's monograph about Cupid and Psyche, subtype 425A corresponded to "Cupid and Psyche", being the "oldest" and containing the episode of the witch's tasks. In the international index, however, Swahn's typing is indexed as type ATU 425B, "The Son of the Witch".)

== Variants ==
=== Turkey ===
Scholars Wolfram Eberhard and Pertev Naili Boratav established a catalogue for Turkish folktales, the Typen türkischer Volksmärchen ("Turkish Folktale Catalogue"). In their joint work, Eberhard and Boratav grouped tales with the supernatural husband in animal form under type TTV 98, "Der Pferdemann" ("The Horse Man"), which corresponded in the international classification to tale type AaTh 425.

In one variant collected in Develi, the supernatural husband is a horse. After the wedding, the horse reveals his true nature and asks his wife to keep it a secret. He takes part in a Cirit competition for three days, wearing red, white, then black garments. The heroine betrays his trust and loses him. Later, she opens a free bath house; an old woman and her son tell the heroine where they found her husband. After she goes to her mother-in-law's house, she is forced to do chores for her: to sweep the floor with a broom; to wash clothes a certain way, and to get musical instruments from a relative of her mother-in-law. Next, her mother-in-law places the heroine as candlebearer to her husband's marriage to the false bride, hoping that the candles will burn her.

In one variant collected in Ankara, the supernatural husband is a camel. A woodcutter finds the camel, which brings the man many riches and is eventually bought by the king. The king's daughter marries the camel, who reveals he is a man underneath the animal form. He takes part in a war to defend the kingdom, and his wife betrays his trust. After he vanishes, she opens a free bath house; an old woman and her son tell the heroine where they found her husband. After she goes to her mother-in-law's house, she is forced to do chores for her: to fill many jars with her tears; to fill sacks with bird feathers, and lastly to get musical instruments from a relative of her mother-in-law for the supernatural husband's marriage to a false bride. This tale contains the episode of the Magic Flight: as the heroine and her husband escape from his mother's clutches, they shapeshift into a garden (her) and a garden-keeper (him).

=== Assyrian people ===
Russo-Assyrian author Konstantin P. (Bar-Mattai) Matveev translated and published a tale from the Assyrian people, titled "Теленок" ("The [Bull] Calf"). In this tale, an old couple find a bull calf on their doorstep and take him in. Later, the little animal asks his mother to woo the princess for him. The king hears her proposal, but asks him to perform some tasks first: first, to build a large palace as splendid as the king's; then, to amass as much gold as silver as the king has, and lastly, to create pathways of marble decorated with fountains between the old couple's house and the king's palace. The bull calf turns into a human youth, rubs a ring and with a command fulfills the king's orders. He marries the princess and, on the wedding night, takes off the bovine skin, but wears it again in the morning. One day, the princess tells her mother about her husband's woman form, and the queen advises her to ask for his bull calf skin and burn it in a tandoor oven. The princess tricks her husband, is given the animal skin and burns it, despite her husband's warnings. The human bull calf becomes a bird and flies away. The princess goes after him with iron shoes and an iron cane, but cannot find him. Seeing that her iron shoes are worn out, she then builds an inn to give food and water to travellers in exchange for news of her husband. One day, a father and duo son come to the inn and tell the princess about a strange sight: the son went looking for their donkeys, saw three camels delivering flour to a mill and three pigeons (one yellow, one white, one blue) perched on their donkeys talking about lost wives; the blue one about his who has built an inn. After listening to the story, the princess asks to be guided to the place where the duo were. The princess arrives at the mill and meets her husband, who tells her his family might kill her. Despite the danger, the princess opts to be with him, and he hides her with her sister. However, his mother discovers the princess and imposes chores on her: to wash a piece of white wool black and to wash the blackened wool, white again, then to go to her sister and get a comb. The princess's husband helps her in all tasks: to get the comb - which is a trap, since his aunt might devour her -, she is to use a command to a river of pus and blood, give the correct fodder for a lion and a horse; get the comb in the aunt's barn and escape. The princess follows his advice and escapes. Finally, the mother-in-law weds her son to her niece, but he kills his cousin and escapes with the princess. They change shape to throw off their pursuers: first, an old man (him) and a mill (the princess); and a gardener (him) and a cucumber orchard (the princess). The husband's sisters notice the cucumber orchard is the princess, but stay their hand and go back to their mother. The princess and her husband return to her kingdom and celebrate a new wedding.

=== Lebanon ===
Researcher Samia Al Azharia Jahn translated a Lebanese tale with the title Sitt Ward, originally published by author Karam al-Bustani, and collected around Dar al Qamar. In this tale, a king has three daughters, the youngest named Ward ("Rose"). One day, he buys a fine-looking Arab horse with blue-black colt. The horse can only feed if Ward gives it some food. The king notices the interactions between the horse and the youngest daughter, and suggests she moves to the stables. In her new quarters, princess Ward sees a man with her: the man reveals that he is the horse, named Maimun, son of the king of the Djinni of the Waq-Waq island, and that his equine form is due to a talisman on his cousin's hair. Ward promises to keep his secret. Later, Maimun fights in a war to protect his father-in-law kingdom: on the first day, in blue robes and riding a blue horse; on the second day, in red robes and riding a red horse; and on the third day, in white robes and riding a white horse. Ward reveals the secret and he disappears. She wanders the world, trying to find Waq-Waq, to no avail. She then goes to another country and builds a castled inn, where people are to come and tell stories. A boy and his mother plan to go there, but, during a storm on the way there, they hide in the hollow of a tree and see a strange sight: tables and chairs appear before them, 40 doves and a golden bird come and become maidens and man, and the man, after the doves depart, cuts an apple into four pieces and laments over a lost love who betrayed him. The boy and the grandmother go to Sitt Ward's castle and tell her the story. Sitt Ward goes to the tree, sees the scene on the 7th day, and follows the man - her husband Maimun - into a crevice. Maimun takes Ward - not knowing of her identity - as a servant for his family and protects her from his mother, a man-eating ghoul. Some time later, Ward wakes Maimun up one night and they reconcile. The man says he is to be married to another bride, but they can cause a distraction during the wedding: on the wedding day, Ward torches the bride's hair with a candle; it catches on fire, and so do the hairs of Maimun's cousins. Ward and Maimun seize the opportunity to escape back to her kingdom, him in the shape of a large golden bird. Samia Jahn stated that the Egyptian tale from Giza (see above) shows the same conclusion as Sitt Ward: the supernatural husband's mother forces tasks on his human wife. The tale was reprinted by author Ursula Assaf-Nowak with the title Fräulein Ward ("Mistress Ward").

== See also ==
- The Golden Crab
- The Donkey's Head (Turkish folktale)
- Princess Himal and Nagaray
- Cupid and Psyche
- Graciosa and Percinet
- The Green Serpent
- The King of Love
- Prunella
- Ulv Kongesøn (Prince Wolf)
- The Golden Root
- The Horse-Devil and the Witch
- Tulisa, the Wood-Cutter's Daughter
- Khastakhumar and Bibinagar
- Habrmani
- La Fada Morgana
- The Son of the Ogress
- Yasmin and the Serpent Prince
- Sea-Horse (Syrian folktale)
