= The Camel Husband =

Folk tale
- Name: The Camel Husband
- Aarne–Thompson grouping: ATU 425D, "The Vanished Husband"
- Region: Palestine
- Published in: Arab Folktales by Inea Bushnaq (1986)
- Related: The Golden Crab

The Camel Husband is a Palestinian Arab folktale published by author Inea Bushnaq in Arab Folktales, about a princess marrying a youth who is hiding under a camel skin, betrays his secret and has to search for him.

The tale is related to the international cycle of the Animal as Bridegroom or The Search for the Lost Husband, in that a human princess marries a supernatural or enchanted husband in animal form, breaks his trust and he disappears, having to search for him. Specifically, the tale belongs to a subtype of the cycle, classified in the international Aarne-Thompson-Uther Index as tale type ATU 425D, "The Vanished Husband".

== Summary ==
In this tale, a poor barren woman suffers for not having children, and sees mothers carrying and playing with their young sons. Even when she goes to the well to draw water, she finds a camel playing with its young. She longs to have her own son, so she prays to God to have a son, even if they are a young camel. Thus, nine months later, she gives birth to a camel she names "Jumail", or "Little Camel". One day, Jumail asks his mother to find him a wife. A peasant girl is brought to him as a prospective bride, and even a rich dowry is given for her, but the camel son only wants the sultan's youngest daughter. The camel's mother worries for her safety, since a poor woman asking for the princess's hand on her son's behalf could be seen as an affront to the sultan.

Still, his mother goes to the sultan to ask for his daughter's hand in marriage. She explains her son is a little camel. The sultan laughs at her and orders him to produce as bride-price his daughter's weight in gold. The woman chastises her son for the result of his request, but Jumail assures his mother he will fulfill the sultan's request. The next day, Jumail guides the sultan's men to a cave filled with gold, silver and precious gems. Defeated, the sultan agrees to marry his youngest daughter, Princess Ward, to him. During the procession towards Jumail's house, people comment on a shame of a marriage between princess and camel.

The princess enters Jumail's chambers and finds a handsome youth; he reveals he is a man under the camel skin, the son of the king of the jinns, and asks princess Ward not to betray his secret. The sultan visits his daughter and finds her reasonably happy with her marriage.

One day, war breaks out, and the princess climb the roof of the palace to see their husbands' prowess in battle, mocking Ward's camel husband. Suddenly, a knight in white robes and on a white mare joins the fray and goes to fight for the kingdom - it is Jumail, in human form. When he returns with the army, Princess Ward points to the warrior in white among the returning men and says it is her husband, the camel. Ward regrets her deed, and discovers her husband Jumail has vanished. She sends people to search for him, and mourns for his absence.

Some time later, the sultan builds a bath house, called Hamman of Princess Ward, where women of any social class can bathe for free in exchange for a story. An old widow woman wants to use the hamman, despite not having a tale to tell. On the road, the old widow and her grandson climb up an olive tree for safety and see a hen and a rooster walk by and summoning the elements to clear the path, then the ground cracks up and forty slaves appear carrying trays of food and basins, forty doves alight in the basins to become maidens, and a prince appears to join them for a meal; the prince cuts up an apple in four slices and offers then to the east, the west, to himself and finally to his love. The prince stomps on the earth and the retinue vanish with him.

The old widow and her grandson come to Ward's bath house and tell the princess about a tree in a place somewhere, where the ground cracked open and a prince came out of the opening with a retinue. Princess Ward asks the woman to be guided to that exact spot. Ward and the widow see the events repeat themselves up to the moment when the prince, Jumail, steps on the ground to produce an opening. Princess Ward goes after him and asks him to return to her. Jumail says that Ward crossed the boundary to the realm of the Djinns, and they reunite.

== Analysis ==
=== Tale type ===
The tale is related to the cycle of the Animal as Bridegroom or The Search for the Lost Husband (tale type ATU 425) and is classified, in the international Aarne-Thompson-Uther Index as subtype ATU 425D, "The Vanished Husband". In this subtype, after betraying her supernatural husband's secret, the heroine builds an inn, hospital or bath house to listen to passers-by's stories. One day, she listens to a person's narration about a flock of birds transforming into men in a place somewhere. The heroine recognizes it is about her husband and asks to be taken there. Scholar Hasan El-Shamy classified it as both type ATU 425A and type ATU 425D.

=== Motifs ===
==== The camel husband ====
According to researchers Samia Al Azharia Jahn and Ayten Fadel, the supernatural bridegroom may appear as a horse, a goat or a camel in Arab variants.

==== Fulfilling the monarch's tasks ====
According to Jan-Öjvind Swahn and Georgios A. Megas, the motif of the animal suitor fulfilling the king's tasks before he marries the heroine appears in variants from Eastern Europe and the Near East. In Hans-Jörg Uther's revision of the index, published in 2004, type ATU 425D involves a poor couple finding or adopting an animal son, who later fulfills the king's tasks before marrying the princess.

==== The husband's location ====
According to Greek folklorist Georgios A. Megas, the main motif of tale type 425D is H11.1.1, "Recognition at inn [hospital, etc.], where all must tell their life histories". In the same vein, Swedish scholar Jan-Öjvind Swahn identified among the "motifs characteristic of subtype D" the bath-house, the inn, or places where the heroine goes to hear stories or news about her husband. In addition, in his study, Swahn determined that the bath-house as the location the heroine opens is "traditional" in Turkey, but also appears in Arabic, some Balkanic tales, and in a few Greek variants (in the latter along with the inn).

== Variants ==
=== Palestine ===
In a Palestinian version from Birzeit, collected by orientalist Paul E. Kahle with the title Der verzauberte Jussif ("The Enchanted Jussif"), an old merchant named Nassireddin finds a camel outside his house and he and his wife take him in as son. One day, the camel signs with his head that he wants a wife. A Fellachenmädchen interprets the camel's head gesture that he must seek a wife among the merchant class. Nassireddin finds as a prospective bride a friend's daughter. The merchant friend asks Nassireddin about his son, but Nassireddin spins a story about his son never leaving the house for fear of the Sun and the moon and the people's stares. At any rate, the camel marries the merchant's daughter, and she gives birth to three boys in the following years. One day, the merchant's daughter and her sisters go for a walk and talk about her husbands, and she reveals her husband, the camel, is actually a handsome youth who rides a white horse. She goes back home and notices her husband and sons's absence. The tale then flashbacks to when the camel husband showed his true form under the camelskin, with a warning that, if she reveals the secret, the camel husband will disappear with their children. In the present time, the merchant's daughter builds a bath (house). One day, a middle-aged fellahin woman comes to the bath to tell a story in exchange for using the facilities. The fellahin woman narrates her tale: on a moonlit night, by an olive tree, she saw 40 birds; the birds took a bath, ate, drank and flew away; a hen and a rooster told the wind and the rain to come; a man lamented to three children about his wife Warde (Rose) who had betrayed his secret. The merchant's daughter and the fellahin woman go to the olive tree to wait for the birds to come. The birds come; the merchant's daughter tries to convince her family to come back. Her husband promises to heed her pleas. The next day, he brings the children back with him to their mother. Hasan El-Shamy classified this tale as both type ATU 425A and type ATU 425D.

In a Palestinian tale collected by author G. C. Campbell with the title The Story of the Milk-Seller and of the Afrit King, a young woman named Zainab lives in the city of Damascus and works as a milk-seller, getting milk from farmers and selling sour milk. One day, she mixes the milk from the previous day and waits until it becomes lebn, but it does not. When morning comes, she hears the crowing of a rooster, and the milk turns to lebn of a delicious flavour. Zainab decides to find the rooster, of a golden plumage and scarlet comb, and follows the bird into a hole in the ground that leads to a cave. Inside the cave, a meal is set on a table, and she eats some of it. Suddenly, the girl hears some footsteps and hides under the table. The mysterious newcomer enters the room and, noticing something missing from the meal, asks for Zainab to come out. The girl does and sees the stranger, a handsome youth with the same scarlet comb as the rooster, who introduces himself as the King of all the Afrit, nothing more. Zainab and the King live together in the cave, and he even says the girl can come out of the cave into the world above, but warns she must not reveal anything about him or her life, lest misfortune befalls them. Some time later, Zainab decides to visit her friends in the city, and the King of the Afrit allows her to go out, but decides to accompany her in the shape of a scarlet comb she puts in her hair. She leaves the cave and meets her friends, who are curious about her fine clothes and jewels and bother her with questions she does not answer. However, one girl notices the comb on Zainab, similarly to a rooster's, and Zainab does reply she saw it first on a rooster. Suddenly, the comb jumps out of her hair and falls to the ground, losing his way into the crowd. Zainab tries to get it back, but fails, and goes to the cave where she lived with her husband, but it has also vanished. After some time, she sells her jewels and opens up a coffee house, where people can have meals in exchange for sharing a sad tale. One day, an old woman comes to the coffee house and tells Zainab she saw a rooster walking in the orchard and weeping about someone who struck him with a comb. Zainab asks to be taken to the orchard and sees the rooster. The bird recognizes his wife and says he will transform her into a bird just like him, since, as a human, she betrayed him. Thus, the King of the Afrit changes his wife into a hen bird, who flies up to the tree to be with him. Hasan El-Shamy classified this tale as both type ATU 425A and type ATU 425D.

=== Israel ===
Scholar Heda Jason described a similar narrative, present in the Jewish Oriental tale corpus and which she named AaTh 425*Q, "Marvelous Being Woos Princess". According to her tale type, a son of supernatural origin (either adopted or born to human parents) instructs his parents to woo the princess; he marries the princess; due to some action by the princess, the husband disappears; some time later, a person follows a strange animal to an underground palace, where the supernatural husband is seen with other companions; the person relates the incident to the princess in her inn or bath house. In the same vein, folklorist Dov Noy abstracted a similar Jewish oikotype based on eight Jewish tales archived in the Israeli Folklore Archives (IFA) and on three Eastern European (Yiddish) tales. Doy's typing begins with a supernatural son that is born to a poor family and wants to marry the king's daughter; however, the king orders the would-be suitor to provide a dowry of gold and silver treasure for the princess and to perform tasks. According to Noy, in Jewish variants of type AT 425, the most common form of the supernatural husband is a camel, followed by other animals.

In an Israeli tale titled The Camel's Wife, a barren woman is instructed by a stranger to go to the desert and drink from a certain well. She does and nine months later she gives birth to a baby in the shape of a camel. One day, the camel tells his mother to ask for the king's youngest daughter as wife. The king agrees to the camel son's proposal, but he has to find three items first: a carpet large enough to accommodate the army and when rolled up it could fit in a nut; a branch of grapes that could feed the army, and there would still be some on the cluster; and a watermelon with rind of gold and pits of precious gems. The camel instructs his mother to go to a cave and shout three times "The camel is dead, the camel is alive" (Met hakamal, chai hakamal); a voice will answer that "it should never be" (Khas v’ha leela) and give her the objects. The camel fulfills the requests and marries the princess. On the wedding night, the camel explains that he is human beneath the camelskin and that the princess must never reveal the secret. He then takes off the fur and becomes a man. One day, war breaks out in the kingdom and the princess begs her husband to help her father. The camel husband becomes human, fights in the war and gets injured. The king sees the warrior and wraps a handkerchief around the injury. When the king's sons-in-law return home, the princess's older sisters mock her about her animal husband, and she reveals her husband is indeed human. The elder sisters convince her to burn the camel fur. She does; the camel husband, in human form, tells the princess that she will only find him after walking with an iron cane and wearing iron clogs on her feet, turns into a bird and vanishes. The king builds a bath house where people are to tell unusual stories. One day, a woman comes to the bath house and tells a strange story: on a moonlit night, one the way to the market to buy thread, she saw a camel and a beetle and followed them to a cave; inside the cave, bread was baking by itself in the oven; three doves came with a tablecloth, opened it and exhorted the house to cry and weep with them. The princess asks the woman to guide her to the cave, with the iron cane and the iron clogs. They follow the camel and the beetle and enter the cave. They see the doves, which tell the house to smile and laugh. The princess sees her husband and reconciles with him. The tale was collected from a Jewish-Iraqi source named Marcel, by her daughter, Aviva Shemesh, and archived in the Israeli Folklore Archive (IFA) with the number IFA 11987.

== See also ==
- The Golden Crab
- The Donkey's Head
- The Tale of the Woodcutter and his Daughters
- The Horse-Devil and the Witch
- Grünkappe
- The Padisah's Youngest Daughter and Her Donkey-Skull Husband
- Sea-Horse (folktale)
