= Fairer-than-a-Fairy (Caumont de La Force) =

French fairy tale

Fairer-than-a-Fairy or More Beautiful Than Fairy (French: Plus-Belle-que-fée) is a literary fairy tale by Charlotte-Rose de Caumont de La Force in 1698.

== Synopsis ==
A King and a Queen, who have several children, decide to journey across their Kingdom. One day, they stop in a castle at the frontier and the Queen gives birth to a beautiful princess. Because of this, the courtiers name her Fairer-than-a-Fairy. But no sooner has the Queen recovered that she must join the King, who has gone to defend a faraway province attacked by their enemies.

When Fairer-than-a-Fairy is twelve, her beauty becomes famous in all the surrounding countries. The Fairies become jealous of her beauty and her name and decide to avenge themselves and destroy the Princess’ beauty. The Queen of the Fairies, named Nabote, goes to the castle in order to kidnap Fairer-than-a-Fairy but she finds it impossible, because the wizard who built it put a spell so that its inhabitants could neither go out unwillingly, nor be bewitched.

Nabote goes into the castle as a servant and makes friends with Fairer-than-a-Fairy. One day, she opens a door that gives onto the countryside and pretends to faint outside the castle's walls. Fairer-than-a-Fairy runs to her but no sooner has she gone out that Nabote seizes her and takes her to her Kingdom. There she dresses Fairer-than-a-Fairy with dirty clothes and instructs her to clean a room which will only become dirtier as she sweeps it.

Nabote's son, Phratis, professes his love for her and magically cleans the room. He gives Fairer-than-a-Fairy a key and tells her to open the main panel in her cell. She obeys and meets Désirs, another princess who was kidnapped because she was beautiful without the assistance of the Fairies’ gifts.

When the Fairies find that the two princesses have fulfilled the tasks, they order Fairer-than-a-Fairy to go on Mount Adventurous and fill a vase with the Water of Immortal Life. They give her feathers and wax, hoping she will crash like Icarus. Désirs is sent on the beach and ordered to write something on the sand on condition that it will not fade. Phratis helps Fairer-than-a-Fairy and she asks him to complete Désirs’ task.

Finally, Fairer-than-a-Fairy is instructed to capture the Hind with Silver Feet and Désirs is sent to the Fair of Time in order to fetch the Rouge of Youth.

At the fair, Désirs meets a wicked Fairy who keeps her in a prison and sends for an evil spirit in order to make her ugly. Désirs is rescued by her lover who has been instructed by a sage to bring her back to the Queen of the Fairies.

Meanwhile, with the help of Phratis, Fairer-than-a-Fairy finds the Hind, who is revealed to be the former Queen of the Fairies under an enchantment. The Queen and Fairer-than-a-Fairy return to Nabote's court, where they save Désirs from being executed, and Désirs’ lover is revealed to be Fairer-than-a-Fairy's brother.

The former Queen retakes her throne, sends Nabote to another kingdom, and arranges the marriages of the two couples.

== Publication history ==
James Planché included it in Four and twenty tales, selected from those of Perrault and other popular writers. The tale was also translated as Gloriosa, or, The Envious Fairies in an anonymous 1845 publication. In this version, the heroine is named Gloriosa, the antagonistic fairy is Dwarfia, her son is Philo, and the second princess is Desira. English writer Laura Valentine translated the tale as Fairer Than A Fairy, and renamed the fairy Dwarfina, her son Pyrrho, the second princess Euryanthe, and the second love interest Orontes.

== Analysis ==
=== Relation to other tales ===
James Planché noted that the story bears "a strong resemblance" to the tale Graciosa and Percinet, by Madame d'Aulnoy, which, by itself, has been compared to Cupid and Psyche.

In another line of scholarship, Italian literary scholar Armando Maggi argues that Caumont de la Force reworked the tale of Cupid and Psyche in her narrative, into the characters of the two princesses, their love interests, and the evil fairy in the role of Venus. Similarly, folklorist Ruth Bottigheimer notes that de la Force's tale "echoes" the tale of Cupid and Psyche, while Jacques Barchilon remarks that the plot of the tale (a beautiful princess hounded by jealous fairies) is "another recall" of the same myth.

=== Motifs ===
In the tale, Fairer-Than-A-Fairy and the second princess both have to perform difficult tasks for Nabote, the fairy, but they are helped by the fairy's son. This sequence is characteristic of French tale type AaTh 425A (or sous-type A), in the French Folktale Catalogue by French scholars Paul Delarue and Marie-Louise Thèneze. (Note: For clarification, the French scholars follows Swedish scholar Jan-Öjvind Swahn, who, in his monograph, classified type 425A as the "oldest". In Stith Thompson's system, Swahn's typing is indexed as type AaTh 425B.)

== See also ==
- Prunella
- Fairer-than-a-Fairy (Mailly)
- Pájaro Verde
- The Little Girl Sold with the Pears
- La Fada Morgana
- The Tale about Baba-Yaga
- The Man and the Girl at the Underground Mansion
