= The Castle of Return and No Return =

Spanish fairy tale from Valencia

El castell d'entorn i no entorn (English: The Castle of Return and No Return) is a Spanish fairy tale or rondalla, first collected by author Enric Valor i Vives from Xixona, Alcoià, Valencia. It is related to the cycle of the Animal as Bridegroom and distantly related to the Graeco-Roman myth of Cupid and Psyche, in that the heroine is forced to perform difficult tasks for a witch.

== Publication ==
The tale was also published as El castell d’en torn i no en retorn.

== Summary ==
In this tale, poor girl Teresa lives with her father, shepherd Frejoan. One day, a hermit comes in and asks for water. Teresa gives it to him and is given in return a magic book. She opens the book; a ghostly figure of a prince answers from within the book and bids her talk to him, but she remains silent. This goes on for two more nights, when, in the third night, the prince figure tells her to go the castle of "Serra dels Plans", beyond three rives of needles of many types ("un d’agulles de cosir, un altre d’agulles saqueres i un altre d’agulles espardenyeres", in the original). Teresa cries, but decides to reach the Serra dels Plans: she commissions iron shoes and walks over the rivers, mountains the forests until she reaches the castle. There, she seeks employment with Queen Tomanina, mother of Prince Bernat, as a lowly servant. Due to her beauty and grace, the queen decides to promote her to her handmaiden, to the elderly housekeeper's, Floreta de Citró, jealousy.

Thus, one day, while Tomanina is dealing with the arrangements of her son's marriage to princess Aiguamar, the elderly housekeeper lies to the queen that Teresa boasted that she could accomplish great things: first, that she could unstitch and clean the mattresses of the entire palace, then fill them with sparrow feathers. The following morning, many carts loaded with the castle's mattresses are carried to the river for Teresa to fulfill the false boast. She cries for the impossibility of the task, when prince Bernat walks up to her. He tries to talk to her, but she remains silent. Still, he gives her two whistles and tells her to blow on the first one, then the second, and finally the third one, and she will see the task done. After Bernat leaves, Teresa blows on the whistles, and suddenly white hands appear to help her unstitch the mattresses and wash them. She blows on the second whistle, and flocks of birds of every species come to offer her their feathers to fill the mattresses. By blowing the third whistle, the birds and hands fly off, and Teresa returns with the carts back to the palace. She drops the whistles on Bernat's room, and Tomanina suspects the prince had a hand in the handmaiden's task, but she denies it.

Next, Floreta consults with a fortune-teller from Fageca, who predicts that, if the queen bathes in the tears of birds she will restore her youth. Floreta tells the Queen that Teresa can fill a large jar with birds' tears, and Tomanina sends Teresa to the middle of the forest to do it for her. Bernat visits Teresa again and gives her a small bell ("cascavell", in the original) to summon the birds to cry on the jar. Tomanina spies the exchange, and decides to send Teresa to her sister, Argelagaina, and to get two boxes from her, La Caixeta d’Entorn i Entorn and La Caixeta de les Caterinetes.

Teresa fears for the dangerous road leading there, when Bernat appears to her and bids her talk to him three times. Still dismissing his pleas, Bernat advises her how to proceed: pluck an apple from an apple tree, otherwise a branch will fall and kill her; before crossing the first river, get ten jars of wine from a nearby cave and draw the mosquitoes to the beverage, otherwise the bugs will bite her; before crossing the second river, get ten bowls of milk from a cave and give it to a snake in the river; gives her a basket to feed two bulls with hay, for the grass they eat is bitter; reach a bakery and give the baker cleaning an oven a rag to help them; reach the creaking castle doors, remove two wedges from a well and place them in front of the doors; meet Argelagaina and ask for the box of Caterinetes, not the box of Entorn i no Entorn.

Teresa does as instructed and meets the beautiful, but wicked queen Argelagaina. The monarch questions the girl the reason for her visit and Teresa explains Queen Tomanina asked for the boxes. Argelagaina delivers the box of "Caterinetes", which Teresa gets and leaves the castle. Before she leaves, she tells Argelagaina she duped the queen. For this, the monarch commands her servants to stop her, but they allow Teresa to pass unharmed. On the way back, Teresa becomes curious to learn what lies in the box and opens it: out comes a horde of little musicians playing instruments. Bernat appears to her and bids her talk to him, but she remains silent. Still, the prince warns Teresa to use a magic flute to summon everyone back to the box and bring it to his wedding to princess Aiguamar, which is to take place at midnight. Teresa does as instructed, returns everyone back into the box and brings it to Tomanina.

Lastly, the Queen orders Teresa to light the castle's large candelabra for Bernat's wedding. As Teresa is adding oil to fuel the lamps, she sees Bernat and Aiguamar passing in front of her, Bernat with a sad expression on his face, and Teresa begins to cry. Bernat notices that Teresa is sad and goes to comfort her, saying that the lamps are going out, to which Teresa replies so is her heart. Due to this, Bernat notices Teresa has spoken to him; the Caterinetes begin to play a wedding song and the celebrant blesses Bernat and Teresa's union, instead of his marriage to Aiguamar.

== Analysis ==
=== Tale type ===
The tale is connected to the cycle of the Animal as Bridegroom or The Search for the Lost Husband, and, more specifically, to the Aarne-Thompson-Uther Index type ATU 425B, "The Son of the Witch" (Catalan: El desencantament del princep: les tasques de la bruixa): the heroine is forced to perform tasks for a witch or her mother-in-law, but she is secretly helped by her husband or love interest.

According to scholars Carme Oriol and Rafael Beltrán, Valor's tale is the only variant of type ATU 425B in Valencia.

=== Motifs ===
==== The heroine's helper ====
According to Danish scholar Inger Margrethe Boberg, the heroine's helper in type 428 (after 2004, subsumed under tale type ATU 425B) may be a young man cursed to be an animal in Northern Europe, while in variants from Southern Europe her helper is the witch's own son, who falls in love with the heroine. Similarly, according to Russian folklorist Lev Barag, in type 428, the heroine's helper may be a wolf (like in Russian or in Serbo-Croatian texts), a cat or a dog; the animal helper then turns into a human male that marries the heroine.

==== The heroine's tasks ====
A motif that appears in the tale type is that the heroine must travel to another witch's house and fetch from there a box or casket she must not open. German folklorist Hans-Jörg Uther remarked that these motives ("the quest for the casket" and the visit to the second witch) are "the essential feature" of the subtype.

In the Valencian tale, the heroine Teresa is sent for the box of Caterinetes from Queen Argelagaina; when she obtains it, Teresa opens the box and out comes an orchestra of diminute-sized people (called "perots" in the Valencian text) that begin to play their instruments. According to Jaume Alberó, since the box of Caterinetes contains a band of musicians and their instruments which are to be used in prince Bernat's wedding, the name "Caterinetes" may refer to the expression "fer les Caterinetes", which means to sing children's songs on the day of Santa Caterina.

Catalan scholarship located the motif of the box of musical instruments in Greek, Turkish and South Italian variants. In that regard, Swedish scholar Jan-Öjvind Swahn, in his study on Cupid and Psyche, remarked that the instruments as the contents of the box are "common" to Mediterranean tradition, but, in "Danish and Romance tradition", playing men leap out of the box (which he supposed was a variation on the motif of the instruments).

== See also ==
- Graciosa and Percinet
- The King of Love
- Prince Wolf
- The Golden Root
- Pájaro Verde
- Los Tres Claveles (Spanish folktale)
- Prunella
- The Little Girl Sold with the Pears
- La Fada Morgana
- Es Negret
- The Man and the Girl at the Underground Mansion
