= Es Negret =

Spanish folktale from Mallorca

Es Negret (English: "The Little Black Man") is a Catalan fairy tale or rondalla, first collected by Majorcan priest and author Antoni Maria Alcover from Mallorca. It is related to the cycle of the Animal as Bridegroom and distantly related to the Graeco-Roman myth of Cupid and Psyche, in that the heroine is forced to perform difficult tasks for a witch.

== Source ==
According to Catalan scholars, the tale was first published in newspaper El Eco del Santuario, in 1891. Per Alcover's notes, the tale was provided by two informants, Na Antonina Guixa i Na Rafela Calona de So'n Servera. In the same vein, scholars Josep A. Grimalt and Jaume Guiscafrè stated that the story printed by Alcover was developed from two versions that were similar to each other.

== Summary ==
In this tale, a poor widow lives with her daughter, named Na Catalineta. One day, they steal some cherries from a cherry tree guarded by a Black man (a negret), and flee, the Black man on their trail. The mother asks her daughter to dig up a hole and hide her in it, leaving only an ear visible. The Negret finds Na Catalineta’s mother and makes her promise to give him her daughter within a year and a day. Time passes, and, one day, the Negret warns Na Catalineta to remind her mother of her promise. After some insistence, the Negret explains he was promised the girl, and takes her to a house of two Madones. Despite kidnapping the girl, the Negret tells her she can call on him for help in whatever chores the Madones demand of her. And so it happens: first, the Madones order Na Catalineta to take a jug and fill it with the water of seven wells. The girl cries for a bit, when the Negret appears to her and agrees to help, in exchange for a kiss. Despite the girl’s refusal, the Negret helps her. Next, the Madones force her to wash a tuft of black wool white.

Thirdly, they order Na Catalineta to go to the Ca-ses Ties de fora-Mallorca and get xeremietes for N’Antonina’s upcoming wedding. The Negret appears to Na Catalineta and advises her to compliment a stream, then a hedge, a herd of toads and a herd of serpents, oil two large doors, enter the house and give a slice of bread to a cusseta (a little black dog), steal a key and take a capseta (a little box) of the xeremietes, then run all the way back. Na Catalineta follows his instructions, and brings the box with her, but opens it to see what the xeremietes are, and a little green bird escapes. The Negret appears again and locks the green bird inside the box, and tells the girl to hurry back to the Madones with the object, for the pair will ask her to identify which rooster will crow the next morning, so that they can find the best time for the wedding. The Madones place the green bird on a stake, give it to Na Catalineta, and order her to spend the night in the hen house with a light source, where she is to identify the rooster.

Some time later, Na Catalineta trades places with N’Antonina, who holds the light until the last rooster, “En Rom”, crows. Her mother then commands the torch to explode, which kills her own daughter. When morning comes, N’Antonina’s mother goes to the hen house to try and kill Na Catalineta, but the Negret stops her and wrings her neck. The Negret changes into a prince and tells Na Catalineta he was cursed by the Madones, then asks her to marry him.

== Analysis ==
=== Tale type ===
The tale is connected to the cycle of the Animal as Bridegroom or The Search for the Lost Husband.

Hispanists Julio Camarena and Maxime Chevalier, in their joint Catalogue of Spanish Folktales (1995), indicated it as a Catalan language variant of tale type AaTh 425B, Las Labores Difíciles ("The Difficult Tasks"). Catalan scholars Carme Oriol and Josep Pujol (2003) classified it as type 425B, El desencantament del princep: les tasques de la bruixa, or Son of the Witch. The type in the Spanish catalogues corresponds, in the international Aarne-Thompson-Uther Index, to type ATU 425B, "The Son of the Witch": the heroine is forced to perform tasks for a witch or her mother-in-law, but she is secretly helped by her husband or love interest.

=== Motifs ===
==== The heroine's tasks ====
A motif that appears in the tale type is that the heroine must travel to another witch's house and fetch from there a box or casket she must not open. German folklorist Hans-Jörg Uther remarked that these motives ("the quest for the casket" and the visit to the second witch) are "the essential feature" of the subtype. Scholars Josep A. Grimalt and Jaume Guiscafrè noted that Na Catalineta's curiosity and disobedience in opening the box of "xeremietes" "corresponds" to Psyche's opening of Proserpina's box in the Apuleian text.

== Variants ==
=== Spain ===
==== Catalan-speaking areas ====
According to Catalan philologist Caterina Valriu, the tale type was "rarely" found in continental Spain, but has "numerous" variants in the Balearic Islands. Indeed, other Catalan variants of the tale type were located in Mallorca, Catalunya and Eivissa. Scholar Carme Oriol, however, noted that the two tales printed by Amades are dependent on the Balearic tales collected by Alcover.

===== The Hunchback and Marietta =====
In a Catalan tale published by Catalan ethnologist Joan Amades with the title El geperut i la Marieta ("The Hunchback and Marieta"), translated to French as Le Bossu et la Mariette ("The Hunchback and Marietta"), a poor woman and her daughter are starving and decide to pluck some figs from a fig tree guarded by an evil-looking old hunchback.

One day, they are stealing the figs, when, fearing for the hunchback, the woman tells her daughter to bury her near the tree, leaving only her ear visible, and flee, and only return after the hunchback is not in sight.

The girl does as asked and leaves her mother there. The hunchback pulls out the woman by the ear, thinking it is a mushroom, and the woman begs for forgiveness. The hunchback agrees, but makes a deal with her: he will return in a year and a day to take Marietta with him.

After a year and a day, when Marietta is walking back home, she is approached by the hunchback, who tells her to remind her mother of their deal. After three days, Marietta's mother agrees to surrender the girl to the hunchback. The hunchback then takes Marietta to a mansion where seven women live with a daughter, to be their servant. The hunchback also tells Marietta can summon his help by sitting in the shade of three pine trees. The women then order Marietta to bring water from the Seven Fountains, for Pétronille (Petronella, in the Catalan text) to wash her face.

Marietta does not know where to go to find the Seven Fountains, and summons the hunchback by sitting near the pine tree. The hunchback appears, is told about the task, then provides her with the water. For the next task, the old women give Marietta a bag full of dark wool, which she is to wash white. The girl summons the hunchback, who takes the bag of wool, goes to the river, and returns with white wool.

The ladies, noticing that Marietta is performing the tasks, decide to give her a truly impossible one: going to their aunt Maria and fetch the chalumeau for Pétronille's wedding. The hunchback is summoned again and advises Marietta how to proceed: ask a river if it wants to wash the clothes of king Jeannet; ask a wall of brambles if it wants to dry the clothes of king Jeannet, throw a calabash filled with milk to a den of serpents, throw a handful of dry earth to some frogs; grease the hinges of two large doors; enter a manor, enter a large dining room, but eat nothing, steal a little box ("cassette"), grab a bread from the table and toss it to a dog, and rush back without opening the box.

Mariette goes back to the seven ladies' mansion to fetch the provisions (a calabash with milk, dry earth and grease), then makes her way to Midi: she asks the river like the hunchback taught her, and it opens up to let her pass, just as she the wall of brambles; she then gives the milk to the snakes and the dry earth to the frogs, greases the doors, enters the manor and fetches the box.

Suddenly, a dog appears to stop Marietta, but she tosses a bread from the dining room table to the dog. Marietta rushes back with the box, as the dog commands the doors, the frogs and the snakes to stop her, to no avail. After crossing the river and the bramble, Marietta stops to rest, and decides to look into the box: she opens its lid and a green bird flies out of it.

The hunchback appears to her and chastises for opening the box, then says he must grab the bird, for it will save them both, if Marietta listens to its instructions. The hunchback captures the bird and gives it to Marietta, who promptly delivers it to the ladies. Later that night, the ladies orders Marietta to set the table for the upcoming feast, when the bird reminds the girl she forgot the salt shaker, which she also places on the table. The green bird also tells Marietta she will be brought to the henhouse to guess which rooster crowed, to mark Pétronille's wedding hour, but she is not to answer anything. It happens thus, and Marietta is brought to the henhouse with a creuset (a type of torch), and she listens to the crowing of the roosters in silent.

The following morning, the youngest of the seven ladies, pitying Marietta, asks her niece Pétronille to cover for the girl, and replace her in holding the torch inside the henhouse. Pétronille obeys and replaces Mariette in holding up the torch.

Meanwhile, the oldest of the ladies, who is Pétronille's mother, utters a spell so that the person holding up the torch dies. To her surprise, Pétronille drops dead. Her mother, realizing her mistake, grabs Marietta's neck to break it, but the hunchback appears behind the lady and wrings her neck, rescuing Marietta.

Suddenly, thunder erupts, the earth shakes, and the manor with the seven ladies disappears. The hunchback turns back into a handsome prince, who tells Marietta the ladies cursed him into the form, and he would only be released if Pétronille and her mother died. Marietta agrees to marry the prince.

According to Amades, the tale was collected in 1922, from a source in Barcelona named Remei Margarit i Cantarell de Rafeques. The tale was also classified as type AaTh 428 (after 2004, subsumed under type ATU 425B).

== See also ==
- Graciosa and Percinet
- The Golden Root
- Pájaro Verde
- Los Tres Claveles (Spanish folktale)
- Prunella
- The Little Girl Sold with the Pears
- La Fada Morgana
- The Man and the Girl at the Underground Mansion
- The Castle of Return and No Return
