= Negret =

Creature in Catalan mythology

A negret (Eastern Catalan: [nəˈɣɾɛt]) is a small, dark-skinned supernatural creature appearing in Catalan folklore, particularly in traditions from Mallorca. According to folklore, a negret can turn into coins when touched by a burning candle. The name is a diminutive of the Catalan word negre, meaning "black".

A Mallorcan legend associated with the Cova des Negret near Sóller describes a supernatural being guarding a hidden treasure. Versions of the legend were recorded in nineteenth-century collections of Mallorcan folktales.

== See also ==
- Es Negret (Mallorcan folktale)
