= La Fada Morgana =

Catalan folk tale

La Fada Morgana (English: Fairy Morgana) is a Catalan fairy tale or rondalla, first collected by Majorcan priest and author Antoni Maria Alcover. It is related to the cycle of the Animal as Bridegroom and distantly related to the Graeco-Roman myth of Cupid and Psyche, in that the heroine is forced to perform difficult tasks for a witch.

== Summary ==
A powerful and wise queen named Fairy Morgana wants to marry her son Beuteusell to an equally wise maiden. In order to prove herself, the bride-to-be must pass a series of tests designed by the Queen.

Prince Beuteusell meets a peasant maiden named Joana and asks her father's approval for their marriage. Her father boasts that Joana is even wiser than the queen Fairy Morgana, and a maidservant overhears it. She tells the queen of the boast and she summons father and daughter to her court. The queen dismisses the father, but orders Joana to stay, for she intends to set a difficult task for the girl.

The task is to visit Fairy Morgana's mother and ask the old woman for two boxes containing songs inside: the capsa del Bon Jorn and the capsa del congrás. Beuteusell talks to Joana in secret and gives her information on how to approach his grandmother.

Joana passes through a field and compliments a tree stump, and helps a man that was cleaning a stove. At last, she reaches the seven-gated castle of Fairy Morgana's mother. She announces herself and enters the royal chamber. The old queen asks her some riddles, which Joana answers correctly, and gets the boxes.

As a last hindrance for the couple, Fairy Morgana asks Joana on the wedding day which rooster is crowing, to which Joana answers: "el Ros" - as it was instructed by Beuteusell. Joana and Beuteusell are finally married.

== Analysis ==
=== Tale type ===
The tale is connected to the cycle of Cupid and Psyche, and, more specifically, to the Aarne-Thompson-Uther Index type ATU 425B, "The Son of the Witch" (Catalan: El desencantament del princep: les tasques de la bruixa).

Catalan scholarship classifies the tale as type ATU 428, "The Wolf", a type that Jan-Öjvind Swahn considered to be only a fragmentary version of his type 425A. (Note: For clarification, Swahn, in his system, classified type 425A as the "oldest". In Stith Thompson's system, Swahn's typing is indexed as type AaTh 425B.) Accordingly, German folklorist Hans-Jörg Uther revised the international classification system and subsumed previous type 428 under the new type ATU 425B, "Son of the Witch".

=== Motifs ===
==== The antagonist Morgana ====
The antagonist, Fairy Morgana, has also been compared to her possible namesake, the Arthurian fairy and sorceress Morgan Le Fay. Morgana also appears as the name of the female antagonist in other Catalan folktales of type 425B, adapted as a queen named "Mariana", in a courtly scenario.

==== The heroine's helper ====
According to Danish scholar Inger Margrethe Boberg, the heroine's helper in type 428 may be a young man cursed to be an animal in Northern Europe, while in variants from Southern Europe her helper is the witch's own son, who falls in love with the heroine. Similarly, according to Russian folklorist Lev Barag, in type 428, the heroine's helper may be a wolf (like in Russian or in Serbo-Croatian texts), a cat or a dog; the animal helper then turns into a human male that marries the heroine.

==== The heroine's tasks ====
A motif that appears in the tale type is that the heroine must travel to another witch's house and fetch from there a box or casket she must not open. German folklorist Hans-Jörg Uther remarked that these motives ("the quest for the casket" and the visit to the second witch) are "the essential feature" of the subtype. Catalan scholarship locates the motif of the box of musical instruments in Greek, Turkish and South Italian variants.

== Variants ==
=== Spain ===
==== Catalan-speaking areas ====
According to Catalan philologist Caterina Valriu, the tale type was "rarely" found in continental Spain, but has "numerous" variants in the Balearic Islands. Indeed, other Catalan variants of the tale type were located in Mallorca, Catalunya and Eivissa. Scholar Carme Oriol, however, noted that the two tales printed by Amades are dependent on the Balearic tales collected by Alcover. According to Oriol, the Balearic tales form its own ecotype in the islands, which she catalogued as type 425**A, "La Fada Morgana". Similarly, Swahn, in his monograph about Cupid and Psyche, considered that these tales represented a local Catalan tale type, derived from fragmentary versions of his tale type 425A, which has the heroine's tasks for the witch. (Note: According to Maria de la Pau Janer, Josep Maria Pujol followed Swahn's classification and listed variants with the heroine's tasks for the witch under type 425A.)

===== Juana and Fairy Mariana =====
In a Mallorcan tale collected by Alcover in his series Aplec de rondalles mallorquines d'en Jordi des Racó with the title Na Juana i la fada Mariana ("Juana and Fairy Mariana"), a poor man has a beautiful daughter named Joana, who he boasts is wiser than Fada Mariana, the queen. A queen's servant hears the boast and reports back to the monarch, who sends for the girl and her father. Fairy Mariana buys Juana from her father and makes the girl the new servant at the palace. Fairy Mariana has a son named Bernadet, who also possesses powers like his mother, and falls in love with Na Juana. One day, the prince gives her a pair of gloves and promises to help her if she calls him with a command. Later, Fairy Mariana orders Na Juana to wash a pile of black wool white, for Bernat's upcoming wedding. Na Juana cries over the task, but summons the owner of the gloves. Bernadet appears to and, after hearing her plea, summons an army of small men and women to fulfill the task. Before Bernadet leaves, he advises Juana to deny having had his help, by saying she has never seen him. Fairy Mariana sees the task is done and accuses Juana of doing it with her son's help, but, just as he instructed, she denies having even met him. Next, the queen gives the girl tons of hemp and wool, and orders her to spin them and sew a garment for her son. Juana summons Bernadet by the gloves and he helps her again by summoning small men and women to perform the task. Lastly, she orders the girl to mend, fold and wash every clothe in the castle, which is done again with Bernadet's help. Seeing Na Juana fulfilled every task she forced on her - despite the girl's adamant denial of her son's involvement -, Fairy Mariana explodes in anger, and Bernadet marries Na Juana. According to Alcover, the tale was provided by a native of Ciutat de Mallorca, Dona Catalina Tomás Pinya, mother of Mn. Juan Aguiló. The tale was also classified as type 425B, "El desencantament del príncep: les tasques de la bruixa".

===== The Maiden Rosana and The Old Mariagna =====
In a Catalonian tale published by folklorist Joan Amades with the title La donzella Rosana i la vella Mariagna ("The Maiden Rosana and The Old Mariagna"), queen Mariagna is a powerful witch, who dislikes having someone being wiser than her. One day, Rosana's poor father passes by the queen's house and boasts that his daughter is wiser than the queen, which the maidservants hear and report to their mistress. Queen Mariagna then makes an offer to Rosana's father that she will buy his daughter and bring her to her castle. The man agrees and Rosana is brought to live with the queen and is forced to perform tasks for the witch queen: first, to bleach a piece of dark gray wool ("lana burella"), then to weave and sew clothes for the prince in one night with a cartload of linen. However, the maiden prevails with the help from the queen's son, prince Joan, who gives her a magic ring to fulfill the queen's tasks. At the end of the tale, they marry.

===== Queen Joana =====
In a Catalan tale published by Joan Amades with the title La reina Joana ("Queen Joana"), Queen Joana's son, Joanell, wishes to marry, so he looks for a suitable bride. He wanders far off until he meets a poor man and his beautiful daughter Mariagna. The prince tells the man Mariagna can become queen: the man has to dress his daughter in fine garments, take her by the hand and announce out loud that Mariagna is wiser than the queen. The prince predicts his mother, the queen, will want to take Mariagna with her to test her abilities, to see if she is a wiser than herself and her son, and, thusly, a suitable bride for the prince. The queen locks her son in an underground chamber, to keep him from interfering with her tests, and goes to test Mariagna if she is knowledgeable in magic. Queen Joana tells Mariagna to fetch a ring for their wedding, the "anell del bon jorn, bon viatge i bon retorn", from her mother's house. Mariagna leaves Queen Joana's castle in search of the monarch's mother's home. Prince Joanell, who overheard everything due to his magic powers, explains everything to his beloved from his chambers: she is to walk towards the land where the days end, passing by a mountain, a large rock, an open field and seven rivers; she is to enter a forest and pluck a branch of rosemary; next she will meet a man to whom she is to give the rosemary; lastly, she will meet his grandmother and ask her for the ring. Mariagna follows his instructions, traverses the natural landscapes and gives the rosemary to the man, who is baking bread at an oven and sweeping it with his arms. The man thanks Mariagna and lets her pass. Mariagna meets with Joanell's grandmother, who complains to the girl about sleeping on twenty-one mattresses and a single hair hurting her, then a single leaf hurting her feet, a mosquito annoying her. Mariagna asks for the wedding ring, which Joana's mother gives with her blessing. Mariagna returns with the ring, and Queen Joana suspects her son Joanell helped the girl, but she denies it. For the last task, Joanell instructs Mariagna that the queen will ask the girl which rooster will crow in the morning, and she is to answer that is it the "ros" (the red one). The next morning, the Queen asks Mariagna which cock crowed, and the girl answers correctly. Joanell leaves his chambers and goes to meet his bride, and both marry. While watching her son's marriage, Queen Joana, filled with disgust and defeated that someone was wiser than her, dies. Prince Joanell and maiden Mariagna live in peace and happiness and have seven children who are even wiser than themselves.

===== Fairy Morgana (Macabich) =====
In a Catalan-language tale published by author Isidor Macabich with the title La Fada Morgana, Prince Joanet wants to marry a girl, but his mother, fairy Queen Morgana, sends Joana, his intended, on a task to deliver a box ("capsa") to her sisters. Joana takes the box, but wishes to see what is inside and opens it, releasing at once people singing and playing music. The girl despairs at the event, when prince Joanet appears and asks for the box, locking everything back into the box with his powers. Joanet also warns Joana his aunts are terrible demonesses and the task is a trap to get rid of the human girl, then advises her how to proceed: pretend to drink from a stream filled with greenish water and slugs and compliment it by saying it contains fresh water; exchange the fodder between two animals (bones for a dog, grass for an ox); give a broom to a woman sweeping an oven; greet his aunt with the right words ("que bé vaja i que bé torn", in the original) and deliver the box with the letter. The girl follows the instructions to the letter, then rushes back, as Joanet's aunts command their servants to stop her, to no avail. Back at the castle, Queen Morgana is furious Joana succeeded and suspects she had the prince's help, but the girl denies it. The next evening, Queen Morgana tells Joana a Carnaval ball will be held in the castle, for her to choose her suitor among the crowd. Prince Joanet meets Joana in secret and tells her he will be wearing shabby garments. During the ball, the queen tries to convince Joana to find a rich suitor among the guests, but the girl points to a poor man among the crowd (prince Joanet) and chooses him. The queen recognizes her son, but explains his marriage is already set by the following morning. Joanet meets with Joana again and instructs her to say that the white rooster crowed, for his mother will ask her this question. The next day, Queen Morgana asks Joana which cock crowed, the white one or the black one. Joana answers "the white one". At that moment, Joanet's wife, a black woman also named Joana, answers "the black one", and dies. Joanet buries the first bride and confronts his mother about wanting to marry the servant Joana, but the queen curses that he will be unable to marry until she slaps her head three times. Joanet departs home. Some time later, a messenger brings news that Prince Joanet is gravelly ill, has been given the last rites, and is ready to be buried. Each time, Queen Morgana slaps her forehead, fulfilling her own curse. Suddenly, Joanet comes out of his hiding place with Joana in tow. Defeated, Queen Morgana gives her blessings to the couple.

===== En Beuteusell =====
In a Catalan language tale collected from informant Na Concepció Ribas, from Palma, with the title En Beuteusell, Na Catalineta's mother goes to steal some gold and silver from an old fairy, but the fairy discovers her and makes the woman promise to surrender Na Catalineta to her. The girl, named Na Catalineta, goes to work for the fairy and meets her fairy son, named En Beuteusell, who advises the human girl to call out for him whenever she finds herself in trouble. First, the fairy woman orders Na Catalineta to fill three mattresses with bird feathers. The girl summons Beuteusell to help her, and he summons the birds to give them their feathers. After her task is accomplished, the fairy confronts Na Catalineta about meeting Beuteusell, but the girl denies it. The tale ends.

==== Murcia ====
Spanish academic Ángel Hernandez Fernandez abstracted the common traits from a tale from Jumilla and another from Cartagena (both located in the Region of Murcia), and developed a tale type from the region with the same typing, ATU 425B. In his system of Murcian folktales, type 425B, El pájaro ayudante ("The helpful bird"), the heroine leaves home to escape mistreatment from her step-family and finds employment in a castle. There, the queen, based on false claims by the other servants, forces the heroine on difficult tasks, which she accomplishes with the help of a bird (that may be changed into a prince at the end of the story).

In a tale from Jumilla collected by researcher Pascuala Morote Magán with the title Pajarito Verde ("Little Green Bird"), a girl finds a bird who gives her a mantilla and a teja (a tile), and she leaves home from her step-family to work in the king's castle. One day, the queen gives her a bottle to fill with birds' tears. The girl summons the little green bird to help her, and he orders all birds to come and cry over the bottle. Next, the queen asks her to find a ring she lost in the sea: the bird summons the fishes, one speckled, the second white, and the third green, and she brings the queen's ring. Thirdly, the queen orders her to go to the castle of Irás y No Volverás. The little green bird advises her how to reach it: she will find an ox eating meat and a wolf eating hay, which she is to place for the right animal; then, she will find a woman cleaning an oven with a boja (a sort of stone), whom she is to give a stick to help her; lastly, she is to enter the castle only when a woman is sleeping with her eyes open, get the caja de los caudales, and escape. The girl takes the box and its keeper wakes up, ordering the woman at the oven and the animals to stop her, but they remain still. On the way back, she enters the church where the king's son was asleep with candles on his toes and crashes into the altar.

In a Murcian tale collected in Sierra de Mazarrón with the title La Tierra de Ifre ("The Land of Ifre"), a girl named María lives with her widowed father. She goes to school and passes by the house of a widow who has her own daughter, and insists María convinces her father to join their families, for she will give "sopa de miel" to María. The girl tells her father about it, but he warns her new stepmother will soon give her "sopa de hiel". Time passes, and eventually María's father marries the widow. The man leaves on business trips, and also brings gifts to his stepdaughter. One day, he asks María if she wants something, but she wants for nothing. One night, however, the Virgin Mary appears to María in her dreams and tells the girl she should ask for three roses a giant guards: a white one, a green one, and a yellow one. The next day, María tells her father to bring her the flowers described in her dream. Before the man returns, the Virgin Mary appears to María again and tells her she should light each of the flowers on fire and talk to whatever appears in the flames. María's father brings her the roses, she goes to her room and burns the white rose that same night: a gentleman in white appears and begs her to talk to him, but he vanishes before she can utter a word. The next night, she burns the green rose, and the same gentleman appears to her in green garments, and still María is silent. The third night, she burns the yellow flower, and the gentleman appears in yellow clothes. Before he vanishes, he tells María to seek him in "la tierra de ifre" ("the land of ifre"). María decides to seek the land of ifre, by asking the harvesters in the village about it. A pair of peasants, an old man and his daughter, say they hail from there, and María decides to join them the next time they return to their homeland. The trio journey on mules until they reach the sea which blocks their path. Suddenly, a large bird appears in the air and bids María talk to him. María remains silent, but jumps on the bird and it takes her to the land of Ifre across the sea. The girl then hires herself as a servant to the local queen. In time, the other maidservants begin to gossip about María, jealous of her beauty, and lie to the queen the girl boasted she could wash, dry and iron all the clothes in the castle. María receives piles and piles of clothes, to be done lest she is executed, and cries next to the river. The same bird that carried her over the sea (which the tale says is a green bird) appears to María and bids her talk to him. She keeps her peace, but the bird teaches her a magic command then leaves. María repeats the bird's words and the work is done for her. Next, the castle's maidservants lie that María boasted she could restore the queen's sight. María goes to cry in next to the river, the green bird appears, gives her a small flask and teaches her a spell to summon all birds for them to offer their tears. María does as instructed and fills a flask with birds' tears, curing the queen's eyesight. Now with her vision restored, the queen decides to hold a ball for the "reyes encantados" ("enchanted kings"). Every girl attends the ball with a candle in hand as part of a procession. The tale was also classified as type Aa-Th 425B, Las labores difíciles.

==== Other regions ====
In a variant from Cádiz, collected from teller Carmen Pérez Galván, from Chiclana de la Frontera with the title Rosa, a young woman named Rosa lives with her travelling father. Their neighbour, a widow with two daughters, tells Rosa to convince her father to marry her. She does, and, as time passes, their neighbour, now her stepmother, mistreats the girl and favours her two biological daughters. The last straw is when the stepmother tells Rosa to seek employment somewhere else, since Rosa draws any suitor's attention away from the step-sisters. Rosa leaves home and meets an old lady on the way, who directs her to a castle, to work for the lady of the castle, the queen, as her hairdresser. Eventually, the castle's servants, jealous of Rosa's talents and kindness, lie to the queen that she boasted she could do impossible things. The queen summons Rosa to her presence, and comments about the false boasts: that she can find the queen's missing son, and that she can clean all the palace overnight. Rosa goes to her bedroom and cries about the task, when a knight knocks on the door and tells her not to worry, for everything will be done the next morning. The next day, the whole palace is clean, from top to bottom. The other servants spread another rumour: that Rosa can wash and iron all the clothes of the palace's inhabitants. The same knight knocks on the door and tells her not to worry. By the next morning, the clothes are washed and ironed. Lastly, the queen reminds Rosa about the boast that she can locate her son, who has been missing for 20 years. The knight instructs Rosa to escape by a castle backdoor into an alleyway, carrying a sack of straw, a bag of bones, a comb, a piece of bread and a satchel of tobacco. The girl must go on until she finds two bulls (to which she must give the straw), two dogs (to which she must give the bones) and a long-bearded old man cleaning an oven with his long fingernails (to whom she must give the comb, the bread and the tobacco). At the end of the journey, she must ring a doorbell, and a witch will let her in. Inside, she will find a box surrounded by four candles. The girl is to put out the candles, take the box, and return to the castle by the backdoor. The girl follows the knight's instructions to the letter, and brings the box to the queen. The queen opens the box and her son comes out of it. The prince and Rosa marry. The tale was also classified as type 425B.

Galician ethnographer Lois Carré Alvarellos published a tale collected from Campamento, in San Xurxo de Iñás, with the title A Filla do Rei, which researcher Marisa Rey-Henningsen translated as The King's Daughter, and to German as Die Königstochter. In this tale, a king locks his only daughter in a high tower to protect her from the world. However, when she is old enough, she peers outside the tower and marvels at the moonlight. Some days later, she decides to leave the tower and wander the world. One day, she cries in the middle of the road, when a ram appears to her. The animal asks for a kiss; she refuses, but it agrees to accompany her. Later, the ram guides her to a house where she finds work for a mother and her daughter, who are secretly a pair of witches (Galician: meigas). The witches order the girl to get them the "caixa de demachiños" ('the little box of demachiños'; 'goblin casket', in Marisa Rey-Henningsen's translation; "Kästchen mit den Teufelchen", 'little casket of the little devils', in the German translation). The girl does not know where to find it, so she wanders off until she finds a donkey whom she feeds with grass instead of straw, a bull she gives bread instead of grass, and a rooster she gives wheat instead of corn. The animals guide her to the place where she can find the box, and the princess enters the house and steals the box. Suddenly, a very old, very ugly woman comes out of the kitchen and wrestles with her for the box, the princess is stronger and flees; the old woman orders the animals to stop her, but they refuse due to the girl's kindness. On the road, she opens the box to see what lies inside, but it is apparently empty. She delivers the box to the witches, but they realize the box is empty, so they send the girl for another box. The princess gets a second box which she does not open, and gives it to the pair. Later, the witch duo forces the girl to gather piles of clothes, wash, dry, mend and iron them before noon. The girl cries over the task, when the ram comes to her and summons an army of rams to fulfill the task. Finally, the princess goes back to her father in the company of the ram and introduces the animal as her saviour. She washes it in a fountain and kisses it; a handsome prince appears before her. The princess then marries the disenchanted prince. Folklorist Walter Anderson classified the tale as type Aarne-Thompson 428.

According to scholars Johannes Bolte and Jiri Polívka, Spanish writer Agustín Durán, in his work Romancero General, reported a tale from his childhood: the hero is a Black man named "Gafitas de la Luz"; the heroine, his beloved one, is persecuted by his parents, who force her on tasks; in one of her tasks she is helped by the birds, which cry over the clothes to wash them and iron them with their beaks. Catalan scholar Josep M. Pujol noted that this tale could refer to type 425B.

== See also ==
- Prunella
- The Little Girl Sold with the Pears
- The Tale about Baba-Yaga (Russian fairy tale)
- The Man and the Girl at the Underground Mansion
- Los Tres Claveles (Spanish folktale)
- The Castle of Return and No Return
- Es Negret
- Graciosa and Percinet
- The Green Serpent
- The King of Love
- Ulv Kongesøn (Prince Wolf)
- The Golden Root
- The Horse-Devil and the Witch
- Tulisa, the Wood-Cutter's Daughter
- Khastakhumar and Bibinagar
- Habrmani
