= The Tale About Baba-Yaga =

East Slavic fairy tale collected in 1795

"The Tale About Baba-Yaga" (Russian: Сказка о Бабе-Яге, romanized: Skazka o Babe-Yage, lit. 'Fairy Tale about Baba-Yaga') is a Russian fairy tale published in a late 18th-century compilation of fairy tales. Variants from oral tradition have been collected in the 19th and 20th centuries from Russian-language and Finno-Ugric speaking tellers. The tale features the witch Baba Yaga as the antagonist of the tale, as she assumes the role of a mother-in-law that viciously hounds her daughter-in-law, the heroine.

== Source ==
According to literary researcher B. I. Chernyshev, the tale was part of a late 18th century book of tales compiled by P. A. Efremov.

== Summary ==
In a distant kingdom, a wise woman named Baba Yaga, bony-legged, has an only son of virtuous character. He marries a human girl. She begins to despise her daughter-in-law and plots to kill her someway or another.

While her son is away, Baba Yaga begs with false kindness for the girl to go to the woods and milk her cows. The girl walks toward the cow pen, but her husband intercepts her in time, and reveals that the "cows" are, in fact, bears that will kill her. Baba Yaga's son then suggests she milks some mares and gives it to Baba Yaga.

The next day, Baba Yaga asks the girl to shear her sheep in the woods. Her husband appears again and tells her that the "sheep" are wolves that will tear her to pieces, so he teaches her a magic command. The girl climbs up a tree, chants the magical command and the wolves shear themselves.

Seeing the girl's newfound success, Baba Yaga then sends her to Baba Yaga's sister with a request for a reed for weaving. The girl meets her husband, who gives her oil, lard, needles and pins, as well as a comb, a tablecloth, a brush and a ring. The girl begins her journey: she oils the hinges of a door; gives pieces of ham to two dogs; gives lard to a cat and needles and pins to a group of girls. The human girl asks Baba Yaga's sister for the reed. Baba Yaga's sister lets her have the reed, while she goes to prepare the bathhouse.

The group of girls warn the human that the witch is planning to devour her, so she must take the reed and escape. The human takes the reed and flees from the house. Baba Yaga's sister enters the house and, noticing the girl's absence, complains that the female servants, the cat, the dogs and door have not stopped her, and flies away on her mortar behind her.

Realizing that she is being pursued by the witch, the human girl throws behind herself the comb, the tablecloth, the brush and the ring to create magic obstacles to hinder the pursuit: the comb becomes a dense forest, the tablecloth a river, the brush a steep mountain and the ring a brickwall. Baba-Yaga's sister manages to traverse the first three obstacles, but is finally deterred by the last barrier, and leaves the girl be. The human girl returns home and delivers the reed to Baba Yaga, who warms up to her daughter-in-law.

== Analysis ==
=== Tale type ===
Russian scholarship classifies the tale as type SUS 428, "Девушка на службе у ведьмы" ("The Girl in the Witch's Service" or "A girl serving a Witch"), of the East Slavic Folktale Classification (Russian: СУС, romanized: SUS). According to scholar Andreas John and Russian folklorist Lev Barag, in the East Slavic type, the heroine's mother-in-law (sometimes identified as witch Baba Yaga) sends her on dangerous tasks in order to get rid of her, but, with her husband's advice, she prevails: with the witch's son's advice, she milks cows (bears), shears sheep (devils), and pays a visit to a second witch in the other world by treating the objects with kindness.

=== Variants ===
The East Slavic Folktale Catalogue, last updated by Russian folklorist Lev Barag in 1979, registers 12 variants. Karelian and Russian scholarship agree that the paucity of registers indicates the "rarity" of this tale type.

==== Russia ====
===== The Daughter-in-Law =====
Russian folklorist Ivan Khudyakov published a Russian tale titled "Сноха" ("The Daughter-in-Law"). In this tale, a couple have a son. Their son marries a girl and the youth's mother sends the daughter-in-law to shear the sheep (actually, bears), then to milk the cows (who are wolves), and finally to her own sister to get a reed for weaving. After the girl goes to her mother-in-law's sister's house, she spits at the four corners of the room, while the witch is sharpening her teeth. She seizes the opportunity to give the cat a piece of butter and the dog a piece of meat, guide a deer into the pen, and sprinkle water on a door and close it. The girl takes the reed and flees - the tale ends.

===== Cow-Bears, Wolf-Sheep, and Baba Yaga =====
Ethnographer Dmitry Zelenin collected a tale from Vyatka Governorate which he titled "Коровы-медвѣди, волки-овцы и баба Яга" ("Cow-Bears, Wolf-Sheep, and Baba Yaga"). In this tale, after a maiden marries, her mother-in-law orders her to milk her cows, but she cannot seem to find the herd. An old woman appears to warn the maiden the cows are bears, and advises her to climb an oak tree, throw them bread and let them milk themselves. Next, the mother-in-law orders her to shear their sheep. The same old woman warns the sheep are in fact wolves, and advises her again. The third task is to fetch clay from the seashore: advised by the same old woman, the maiden asks the help of a nest of ravens and magpies. Lastly, the maiden is to go to her aunt-in-law, Baba Yaga's house and ask for weaving supplies. On the way there, the maiden ties a ribbon around a birch tree, feeds geese and chickens with peas, smears the hinge of a door with butter and gives bread to a dog and a cat. Baba Yaga welcomes her, goes to another room to sharpen her teeth, and invites the maiden to spend the night, because the witch plans to eat her. However, on three consecutive nights, the maiden trades places with a daughter of Baba Yaga, and avoids being devoured, instead letting one of her daughters being eaten in her place. After the three nights, the cat gives her the weaving supplies and tricks its mistress Baba Yaga, allowing the girl to escape. The maiden returns home and finds that her husband is marrying another woman. At the end of the tale, the maiden is carrying a pot of hot water, and the second bride asks her about it. The maiden's husband shoves the second bride through a window and remains with his first wife.

===== Velvet Prince =====
In a Russian tale from White Sea teller Matvei M. Korguev with the title "Бархат чаревич" ("Velvet Prince"), a rich merchant has three daughters. One day, when the man goes to buy goods, the elder daughters ask for clothes or scarves, and the youngest, named Vasilista requests a bed with four doves. The first time, the merchant cannot find the bed and returns home empty-handed. The next time, his youngest daughter repeats her request and the man goes to another city on another trip. After he buys presents for his elder daughters, he goes to look for the bed with four doves, and reaches a hut outside a city. The merchant asks its occupants, an old man and an old woman, where he can find such a bed, and the old man says it is his bed. He sells the bed for two thousand, and tells the man to feed the doves at all times. The merchant returns home and gives his daughter, Vasilista, the bed. She enjoys her gift for nearly a year, and, one such time, forgets to feed two of the doves. The birds then tell her that, if they are not fed, they will fly and take her to Barkhat Tsarevich (Velvet Prince), but the other two doves refuse to do so. The next time, Vasilista does not feed any of the birds, and they take flight, carrying the girl to the Velvet Prince. The Velvet Prince falls in love with her, but she make a vow of silence for three years. The story then explains the Velvet Prince's mother is a terrible witch, Yaga-Baba. She despises her daughter-in-law, since she does not utter a word, and decides to get rid of her by setting deadly tasks. One day, she sends for her and tells her to shear their sheep and bring their wool. After she leaves the house, Velvet Prince intercepts her and warns her to go to the woods, leave the shears on the ground, climb on a stump and utter a spell for the stump to rise out of the ground; soon, forty wolves will come, and she is to command them to shear themselves on the shears and scissors; after the task is done, she can utter another spell to lower the stump back to the forest floor. It happens thus, and Vasilista fulfills the task. Next time, Yaga-Baba orders her to go milk their cows. Once again, the Velvet Prince advises his wife: the cows are not cows, but bears that will kill her, so she is to let the sieve on the floor, summon the cows with a spell, then climb on the stump and chant the same spell as before for the stump to rise and leave her out of danger. It happens thus: as soon as the bears appear, Vasilista rises the stump with a spell and waits until the task is done for her. She then delivers the milk to her mother-in-law, who asks how the girl managed to do it, but gets no answer. On the third year, the woman orders Vasilista to go to a cabin in the woods to check on a pot of cabbage soup, and to turn down the fire. However, this is a trap, since the soup will scald her, some dogs will tear her to pieces, and the gates will creak and smash her. Velvet Prince intercepts his wife before she leaves and warns her: he gives her some lard, some bread and some salt, and tells her to give the bread to the dogs, cross the gates, give some lard to a cat by the stove, and sprinkle some salt on the cabbage soup, minding the drops of the boiling broth. Vasilista follows his instructions to the letter: gives the bread to pacify the dogs, smears the gates with some lard, gives the lard to the cat and seasons the soup with the salt, then makes the way back in safety. When the girl arrives, her mother-in-law is furious with her success and makes the same path she did, this time to admonish the guardians, but the dogs, the gates, the cat and the soup reply the girl was nice to them, unlike their mistress, who mistreated them. On saying this, the soup boils up and burns the witch's eyes, the cat attacks her, she tries to make a run for the gates, but they crush her, and the dogs finish the job. Velvet Prince comments that the witch is dead, and now everything belongs to them. Thus, Vasilista and the Velvet Prince live to old age and with the witch's spells and properties.

===== Other tales =====
Russian scholarship also located variants among Pomor sources in Karelia. In the first tale, the heroine marries the prince, but she is subjected to the mother-in-law's tasks, e.g., milking her "cows" (which are bears), carrying clay across a river of fire. The heroine is aided by an old woman helper. In the second story, the heroine marries her husband against his mother's opinion, who harasses her. The husband intervenes, and the heroine fulfills the tasks with a good witch's help.

One variant of the tale type has been collected in "Priangarya" (Irkutsk Oblast), in East Siberia.

==== Zaonezh'ya ====
In a tale from Zaonezh'ya titled "Как свекрова невесток переводила", a rich merchant talks to his wife that their son needs to be married. They find him a wife. While the merchant and his son go away on business, the woman asks her daughter-in-law to shear some wolves. The girl goes to the fields and wolves attack her. Her son comes back from the journey and asks about her, but his mother lies that she went for a stroll and never came back. The same "incident" happens to a second daughter-in-law. The son marries a third time and goes on a business trip. His mother asks her newest daughter-in-law to shear the sheep. This time, the girl talks to her own aunt, who tells her that they do not even have sheep, but ferocious wolves, and advises her to climb a tree, wait for the wolves to attack each other, get some of their fur, and run back home. Next, the woman sends her daughter-in-law to her sister on the pretence that the girl will have a nice steam bath in the bath house. The girl's aunt warns her that her mother-in-law's sister intends to burn her to death, but advises her to go anyway, with a few precautions. The girl walks through the field and ties a ribbon to a birch tree, then goes to the mother-in-law's sister. While she goes to prepare the bath, the girl greases the door hinges with oil, greases the shutters with pitch, gives meat to the dogs and fishes to the cat, and escapes. The mother-in-law's sister notices the girl's delay and goes to check on her, and finds out that she fled. The mother-in-law tries a last trick: she takes the daughter-in-law to the barn. The girl's aunt advises her to let the mother-in-law go ahead of her, and shove her down a shaft.

==== Karelia ====
Karelian scholarship locates 4 variants of tale type SUS 428 in Karelia, and report that some of its motifs combine with tale type SUS 705.

In a Karelian language tale collected in 1964 and published in 1967 and given the title "Немая жена" ("The Mute Wife") by the compilers, a couple has a son that they marry to a girl. Before she goes to her parents-in-law's house, she throws her ring in the lake and makes a vow not to say any word while under their roof. Time passes, and the mother-in-law sends the girl to the deep forest to shear some sheep. While the girl goes to fulfill the task, an old man tells her that there are no sheep, but wolves in the forest, so he teaches her how to proceed. Next, the mother-in-law sends the girl to shear the sheep again. The old man warns her that the bears will tear her apart, and advises her again. The third time, the mother-in-law sends the girl to her sister's house on the seashore and ask for an iron reed. The old man warns her that at the house on the seashore lives Yaga-baba or someone else, and gives her fishes, meat, grains, a brush and an egg. The girl meets her mother-in-law's sister and gets the reed while the witch goes to prepare a bath. Before the girl leaves, she oils the door hinges, gives meat to dogs and fishes to cat, and flees. The witch goes after her and the girl throws behind her the brush and the egg to hinder the pursuit. She then crosses a river with a tablecloth and arrives just in time to see her husband marrying another woman, the daughter of Yagi-baba. The mother gives the wife some fishes to descale. She finds her ring inside one and starts to talk. The mother tells the girl to bring some molten iron and the meat soup in an apron. Yagi-baba's daughter complains that she had nothing to wear, and the girl retorts she withstood three years without saying a word. They expel Yagi-baba and her daughter.

==== Udmurt people ====
In a tale from the Udmurt people published by folklorist Nadezhda Kralina with the title "Египеча" ("Egipecha"), an old widow named Egipecha lives with her son Ivan. The old woman wants her son to find a wife and has an idea: she sends her pigeons to fly beyond the seas and bring her a girl named Anna. The girl is leaving her house to fetch water when the birds fly in and take her to Egipecha. The old woman marries Anna to her son Ivan and they begin to live together. However, Egipecha begins to mistreat her daughter-in-law. One day, she orders Anna to shear their sheep and bring her their wool. Ivan intercepts Anna and warns her that the "sheep" are actually wolves and bears, and teaches her how to get their hair. Egipecha's next task is for Anna to go to her sister and bring her a бердом (reed for weaving). Ivan gives a piece of meat, a silk ribbon, a kalach, a needle, a water chestnut and a brush. Anna enters a dark forest and gives the meat to a dog, ties the silk ribbon to a birch tree, the needle to some tailors, and enters Egipecha's sister's house. She gives the kalach to her pet cat and asks Egipecha's sister for the reed. The old woman leaves the room for a while; the cat warns Anna to get the reed and escape. After Anna flees, Egipecha's sister chases after her, but the girl throws behind her the brush (which becomes a forest) and the water chestnut (which creates a lake between them). Egipecha's sister asks Anna how to traverse the lake, and the girl suggests she sails in a scarf. The old woman follows the instructions, swims to the middle of the lake and sinks. Anna goes back to Egipecha with the reed and tells that her sister drowned. Egipecha goes to the lake to save her and follows the same instructions. Egipecha drowns, Anna and Ivan are free to live their lives. The tale was originally published in 1948 by author A. Klabukov. The commentator, A. Zapadov, noted that Egipecha was the Udmurt version of the Russian character Baba Yaga. Scholar Isidor Levin classified Kralina's tale as tale type AaTh 428, "The Wolf", of the international Aarne-Thompson Index. (Note: Tale type AaTh 428, "The Wolf", is considered by scholars as a fragmentary version of the tale of Cupid and Psyche, lacking the initial part about the animal husband and corresponding to the part of the witch's tasks. Accordingly, German folklorist Hans-Jörg Uther revised the international classification system and subsumed previous type AaTh 428, "The Wolf" under the new type ATU 425B, "Son of the Witch".)

==== Komi people ====
Four variants are reported in Udorsky District, in the Komi Republic, and three of them show combinations with East Slavic type SUS 313H*, related to the international type ATU 313, "The Magic Flight". Overall, at least seven variants of type SUS 428 are reported from Komi sources.

In a tale titled "Девушка ростом с веретено" ("Girl tall as a spindle"), first collected from a Komi source in 1935, a couple has a daughter, when a Yoma (witch) appears and suggests they marry their children together, lest the witch locks up every chimney in the couple's house. The couple is forced to deliver their daughter to the yoma, who takes the girl with her to marry her son. However, the yoma has no son at all, and forces the girl on hard tasks: first, she is to shear the yoma's sheep. On the road, an old woman ("tetke", in the Russian text) appears to the girl and advises her: the yoma's sheep are wolves, but she can go to the forest, climb up a tree and shout for the "sheep" to come and shear themselves. It happens thus, and the girl delivers the wolves' fur to the yoma.

Next, the yoma orders the girl to milk her cows. Again, the girl's aunt appear and advises her: there are no cows, but bears; she is to climb up a tree, shout for the cows to come and milk themselves, and there will be milk for her. The girl does as instructed and fetches the milk for the yoma. Thirdly, surprised at the girl's success, the yoma orders her to go to the yoma's sister and ask for a birch bark basket. The girl's aunt gives the girl some resin, a flax comb and a brick, with some instructions. The girl goes to the yoma's sister and asks for the basket. The creature goes to another room to sharpen her teeth, and, while it is distracted, the girl oils some door hinges with the resin and escapes the house, when a flock of birds descend on her. The girl throws some dough to distract the birds. The yoma's sister goes to check on the girl and chastises her servants (the doors and the birds) for not stopping her, then flies away on a mortar to catch her.

On the road, the girl throws behind herself the flax comb and commands it to become a dense forest to deter the witch's sister, then the block to become a large mountain, and finally the resin to become a river of resin. However, the girl utters the wrong spell and both she and the yoma are trapped in the resin. The girl sights a crow ("voronushka") flying overhead and begs it to fly home to her parents and warn them their daughter is glued to the resin, so they need to take a large iron crowbar and fire. The crow does as asked, but cannot alert up the old couple. A raven appears next and the girl repeats her instructions. The raven goes to the girl's parents' house and manages to alert them. The couple rushes to help their daughter and finds the yoma glued to the resin. The yoma spins a story that they were just about to visit them. The old couple hammers the yoma to the river of resin and rescue their daughter.

Russian scholar Nikolai P. Andreev, who developed the first East Slavic Folktale Classification in 1929, classified the tale, numbered 34 in the Komi publication, as East Slavic tale type 428, "Tsarevich-volk": heroine serves a witch and is forced to perform dangerous tasks. According to Russian historian Vladimir Petrukhin, this "yoma" character appears in the folklore of the Komi people and the Samoyedic (Nenets people) as a malevolent forest witch that lives in a swamp and owns wolves as her sheep and bears as her cows.

== See also ==
- Baba Yaga
- Ukrainian Fairy Tale
- Russian Fairy Tale
- The Girl as Soldier
- The Man and the Girl at the Underground Mansion
- Prunella (AaTh 428)
- The Little Girl Sold with the Pears (AaTh 428)
- La Fada Morgana (AaTh 428)
- The Man and the Girl at the Underground Mansion (AaTh 428)
- Cupid and Psyche
- Graciosa and Percinet
- The Green Serpent
- The King of Love
- Ulv Kongesøn (Prince Wolf)
- The Golden Root
- The Horse-Devil and the Witch
- Tulisa, the Wood-Cutter's Daughter
- Khastakhumar and Bibinagar
- Habrmani
- The Son of the Ogress
- The Tale of the Woodcutter and his Daughters
- Yasmin and the Serpent Prince
