= Pájaro Verde (folktale) =

Mexican folktale

El Pájaro Verde (English language: The Green Bird) is a Mexican folktale collected by Howard True Wheeler from Ayutla, Jalisco. It is related to the cycle of the Animal as Bridegroom and distantly related to the Graeco-Roman myth of Cupid and Psyche, in that the heroine is forced to perform difficult tasks for a witch.

== Summary ==
A king has an only daughter he loves very much. One day, a youth named "Pájaro Verde" goes to the palace to deliver coals to the king and falls in love with the princess. He goes back to his mother and sighs over this love. The youth's mother plucks some flowers and arranges them in a bouquet to be delivered to the princess. The princess gets the bouquet and is taken to the youth's house.

At the youth's house, his mother takes him by the hand to show him a surprise: the princess herself was brought to their house. The youth's mother then imposes tasks on her: first, she orders the princess to fetch bird feathers for zurrones (a type of leather bag) for Pájaro Verde's upcoming wedding. The princess cries a bit, but Pájaro Verde gives her a little flute and bids her summon all birds with it and ask them for their feathers. Next, Pájaro Verde's mother orders the princess to get tears from the birds. Again, Pájaro Verde advises her to summon the birds with the flute, so they will come and shed their tears for her.

Thirdly, Pájaro Verde's mother orders the princess to go to a "comadre" (a friend) and fetch from there a box of "danzantes y danzarines". The princess gets the box and brings it to the youth's house. However, she begins to hear a song coming from the box and opens it; little animals escape from it. The princess begins to cry, but Pájaro Verde comes and commands the little animals back into the box. Lastly, Pájaro Verde's mother betrothes her son to "an ugly lady", and forces the princess as the lady's bridesmaid. However, Pájaro Verde plans with the princess for the girls to trade places in church.

In church, Pájaro Verde's plan works, and the ugly lady becomes the princess's bridesmaid. During the ceremony, the ugly lady burns to death due to a spell Pájaro Verde's mother sent to whoever was in the bridesmaid's position. Later, Pájaro Verde shows a still alive princess to his mother, who dies of shock that her plans failed. The youth and the princess go to the castle and live happily.

== Analysis ==
=== Tale type ===
The tale is related, in the international Aarne-Thompson-Uther Index, to tale type ATU 425, "The Search for the Lost Husband" and its subtypes, more specifically, to subtype ATU 425B, "Son of the Witch". The tale type involves the heroine being forced to perform tasks for a witch or her mother-in-law, but she is secretly helped by her husband or love interest.

=== Motifs ===
==== The heroine's tasks ====
According to scholar Jan-Öjvind Swahn, in his monograph about Cupid and Psyche, one of the impossible tasks the witch assigns the heroine is for her to fetch feathers from every bird in the world.

Another motif that appears in the tale type is that the heroine must travel to another witch's house and fetch from there a box or casket she must not open. German folklorist Hans-Jörg Uther remarked that these motives ("the quest for the casket" and the visit to the second witch) are "the essential feature" of the subtype.

== Variants ==
=== Mexico ===
==== The Green Bird (Tequila) ====
In a tale collected by Howard Post Wheeler from Tequila with the title El Pájaro Verde ("The Green Bird"), a widower has an only daughter and remarries, but his new wife hates her stepdaughter. While the man is away on a journey, the stepmother banishes the girl from the house, and lies to her returning husband that she left on her own. The girl wanders around until she reaches a castle and finds work there. She is very beautiful, so a vassal of the king comes on to her, but she refuses her advances. For this, the vassal lies that the girl boasted she could separate a mixed heap of an hectolitre of corn ("maíz") and an hectolitre of bean seed ("frijol") in a single night. The king sends for the girl and orders her to fulfill the false boast. She is directed to a room filled with corn and bean seeds and starts to cry, when a green bird perches on her shoulder, asks her not to cry and for her to close her eyes. The following morning, the girl finds the heap of grains sorted out. The same vassel tries to come on to the girl and is again rejected, so he lies to the king the girl promised to disenchant the prince. The king sends for her and orders her to disenchant the prince in eight days, under penalty of death. The girl does to her room to cry, when the little green bird perches on her shoulders, says he is the prince and will help her disenchant him: he gives her a key to a "cueva" and a key for a box, she is to enter the cueva, mind the witch guardian and open the last box, which contains the prince. The girl follows the instructions to the letter and opens up the box containing the prince; the prince then releases other prisoners from other boxes and everyone returns safe and sound to the palace. To celebrate, the king organizes a party where the prince is to choose his bride by perching on the shoulder of his intended in order to be fully disenchant. He flies around the girls at the party, but flies off to the kitchen and perches on the girl that helped him. The king announces they shall be married, the girl kisses the little green bird, and restores him to human form. They marry.

==== Daria ====
Scholar Stanley Lynn Robe collected a Mexican tale from informant Agustina Gomez, from Tepatitlán. In this tale, titled Daria, Daria has a widowed father who marries another woman, who has her own child. Her step-family mistreats her. One day, Daria's father goes to the market and his step-daughter asks for dresses and shoes, while Daria asks for three myrtle flowers, due to being threatened by her step-mother. Daria's father finds the myrtle flowers per the instructions of an old woman and gives them to Daria. Daria throws a myrtle flower in the fire and a bird appears to her. The bird says he is a prince that can be disenchanted if she speaks to him, but she does not. After exhausting the myrtle flowers, Daria's step-mother beats her and orders some servants to take her to the woods and kill her. Out of pity, the servants let her go and kill a dog in her place. The same bird returns and guides Daria to a hut that belongs to the king's milkman, warning her not to leave the house and enter the king's palace, since the servants may spread rumours about her and even his father, the king, may want to kill her. Daria disobeys the bird prince's warnings and goes to the palace. Once there, the servants take notice of her beauty and lie to the king that she promised to separate, in a single night, a bodega ('cellar, storeroom') of mixed heaps of rice and birdseed. The prince, in bird form, helps her fulfill the task. The next day, Daria goes again to the palace, and the maidservants spread another rumour about her: this time, that she promised to get the prince's childhood toys that are in a cage. The bird prince advises Daria: she is to take a path until she reaches a small town square, where a certain house is; she is to knock on the door, and an old lady will greet her; she is to ask for a drink of water and, while the old lady is away, Daria is to get the cage and flee. It happens thus. At the end of a year, the prince's curse is almost lifted, and the king summons all available girls to the palace, each carrying a large candle (círio), while Daria brings a little candle. The prince talks to Daria and she speaks to him, finally breaking his curse. Spanish scholars Julio Camarena and Maxime Chevalier, in their joint Spanish Folktale Index, classified the tale as subtype 425B, Las labores difíciles.

==== Marcia and Marimonia ====
In a tale collected by Stanley Robe from a source in Mezcala, Los Altos, Jalisco, with the title Marcia y Marimonia ("Marcia and Marimonia"), a king and queen have a daughter named Marcia. One day, the queen falls ill and dies, and the king remarries. Marcia does not like her stepmother and cries over it. Some time later, the new queen tells Marcia that the king said the princess can cook food for the entire world. Marcia cries for the impossibility of the task, when a little bird appears to help her: it summons women to fulfill the task for her, and by nine o'clock the food is prepared. The next time, the stepmother says the girl can wash and iron clothes for the entire world. Again, the little bird appears to help her: he gives her three apples which the princess is to cast in the fire for an army of women to appear to help her. The third time, the new queen asks the princess to find the king's wedding ring he lost at sea, his childhood's toys and his cradle. The little bird appears again and fetches the ring from the sea, then advises Marcia where to find the remaining objects: she will walk until she reaches a house where an old woman lives; she is rocking the cradle with a box inside; Marcia is to trick the old woman to fetch a drink of water and, while she is distracted, she is to steal the cradle and the box and escape. Marcia walks towards the old woman's house, finds her rocking a cradle and asks for a drink of water. The old woman cannot leave the cradle unattended, but the princess says she can replace her. The old woman exits the room, then Marcia absconds with the cradle and the little box. After she flees, she meets the bird, which tells her to return home and not open the box. En route to the palace, Marcia's curiosity gets the better of her and she opens the box, releasing monkeys that leap all over the meadow. The little bird appears to her and locks the monkeys inside the box. Marcia returns home with her father's belongings. The king finds his daughter in tatters, then has her change clothes and introduces her to society. Spanish scholars Julio Camarena and Maxime Chevalier, in their joint Spanish Folktale Index, classified the tale as subtype 425B, Las labores difíciles.

==== The King's Great-grandmother's Puppets ====
Author Pascuala Corona collected a tale from an informant in Puebla de los Ángeles with the title Los títeres de la bisabuela del rey ("The King's Great-grandmother's Puppets"). In this tale, a king has a beloved son, who wishes to be married, but the monarch sets three criteria: she must be beautiful, smart and brave enough to find the king's great-grandmother's puppets, stolen by a witch. The prince agrees to his father's terms, but finds no maiden to his fancy, save for Margarita, the gardener's daughter. To test her, he asks her a riddle which she answers correctly. Next, to prove her courage, she offers to venture into the witch's lair and steal back the puppets. The king prepares a carriage and some knights to escort her in her mission. The prince offers to go with her, which the king consents. On the road, the prince and Margarita find an old woman trying to pick tejocotes from a tree. The pair help the old woman, who tells them about the rendezvous point of the witches. They follow the trail to the deep, dark woods, and wait for the full moon, when the witches come to dance and gloat under the moonlight about treasures they have stolen. The pair listen to the witches' dance, and notice that one of them stole the magic puppets from the king's family. After the dance, the witches leave, each to their own home, and the pair follow the one that stole the puppets to her house. They knock on her door and ask for a glass of water; while the witch is distracted, Margarita steals the baulito ('small chest') from her and runs back to the carriage to escape. However, the witch, realizing she was tricked, jumps on the prince and curses him to become a blue bird that can only be restored if Margarita talks again, and, to avoid the girl breaking her spell, curses Margarita never to utter a word in the blue bird's presence. Back to Margarita, still in the carriage, she, moved by curiosity, opens the small chest and lets the puppets escape through the carriage window. The blue bird, who was accompanying her, captures them all and places them inside the box. The girl arrives safely at the castle, and delivers the box to the king. Some time later, the king invites his subjects to see the magic puppets, and orders them to bring torches, lamps and candles to the event. The king then opens the box to release the puppets, which dance before the crowd, overseen by the blue bird. Margarita's light source is put out. The prince in bird form says her candle is 'sad', to which she answers it is her heart that is. On saying this, the prince turns back into human and marries Margarita.

==== The Foreigner ====
Pascuala Corona published a Mexican tale from San Miguel del Mezquital, in Zacatecas, with the title La Frasterita (La forastera) ("The Foreigner"). In this tale, Frasterita is an orphan girl who lives with a rich, blind old lady and her two ugly daughters, who begin to envy the girl's beauty and kindness. One day, the daughters tell their mother that Frasterita knows of a miraculous water that can restore her sight. Frasterita is then given a bottle to fill with this miraculous water, but she does not know where to find it. She asks around, but no one seems to know, until she finds a poor jacalito with an old woman watering some malvones, who gives the girl a ball of yarn and tells her to throw it and follow it where it lands. The girl follows her instructions and reaches a tree where a pink-crested bird is perched on. Frasterita tells the bird about the task, and the animal promises to help: the girl is to go to Loma Parda and summon all the birds by saying that their king wants to get married; then, they will come and shed their tears on the bottle. Frasterita fulfills the task and delivers the bottle to the old lady. Next, the daughters complain that their pillows are too hard for them, and lie to their mother that Frasterita knows where to find soft feathers for them. Again, the girl goes to the jacalito and reaches the tree with the pink-crested bird, who advises her: she is to go to Loma Parda and summon all the "pajaritos de Andriola", by saying their king wants to get married; the birds will come and offer their feathers to her. Once again, she obeys the bird and fulfills the task. Lastly, the daughters lie that Frasterita has a magic crystal palace that can shrink and enlarge, and their mother asks her to bring it to them. The girl goes to the bird again, but this time, he cannot help her. All of a sudden, Frasterita plucks the pink feathers from its crest, and he turns into a human prince, and the birds his loyal subjects. The prince and Frasterita pay a visit to the old lady's daughters and show them the magic crystal palace, which they place in Loma Parda. Frasterita marries the prince, and the story explains that the old woman at the poor jacalito was "hada Merliga" ('fairy Merliga').

=== North America ===
Ethnographer and linguist Juan Bautista Rael collected a tale from a Spanish-language teller from North America. In this tale, titled Pájaro Verde ("Green Bird"), a girl asks her widowed father to marry their old woman neighbour. He does, and the old woman takes her daughter to live with them. Some time later, the man has to go on a journey, and asks what he can get them. His own daughter asks him for the "rosario de Valoria" (rosary of Valoria), per her stepmother's advice, which lies in a dangerous place surrounded by lions and tigers. Despite the danger, her father brings it to her, who gives to her stepmother. Later that night, the stepmother cuts off pieces of clothes and gives to the girl to sew in one night. The girl cannot do it, and summons Pájaro Verde ("Green Bird") to help her, on the pretense she will talk to him. A little bird comes and fulfills the task for her, despite her not addressing him. The next night, the stepmother gives the girl another pile of clothes to sew, but she cannot do the task, and leaves home. She meets some king's launderesses and are welcomed by them. They go to a ball at the king's castle, the girl wearing a veil. The prince goes to meet the veiled girl and asks her to marry him, but she says she cannot do so. The prince then tells his father the veiled girl boasted she could fill bottles with bird tears. The king gives her some bottles and threatens to kill her if she does not fulfill the task. The next day, the girl summons Pájaro Verde again; the little bird comes and tells her to summon the birds by saying Pájaro Verde wants to marry. The little birds come and cry over the bottles. A second ball is held at the castle; she wears a veil, meets the prince and refuses his romantic advances. In retaliation, the prince tells his father she can find them the "puches" that are used to raise the princes. The next time, she summons Pájaro Verde again; he comes and advises her on how to proceed: she is to ask for a river of crystalline water to open up and let her pass, exchange the correct fodder for animals (bone for a dog, hay for a horse), pass by an orchard of trees with fruits and not eat them, enter a witch's house, get the box and run back. The girl follows the instructions to the letter and meets the witch, whom she asks for a glass of water. While the witch is distracted, the girl takes the box lying on a stove and flees. The witch appears and commands the trees, the animals and the river to stop her, but they remain still. At a distance, she gets curious and opens the box of puches: little birds fly out of it. The girl begs for Pájaro Verde to come and help her, he appears and, uttering a spell, commands the birds to fly back into the box. The girl delivers the box to the king. Lastly, there is a third ball at the castle, where Pájaro Verde (the prince's name) will choose a bride. The girl attends again and Pájaro Verde chooses her.

=== Latin America ===
In a tale from Puerto Rico, published by folklorists J. Alden Mason and Aurelio M. Espinosa with the title El Príncipe Encantado ("The Enchanted Prince"), a girl named Alejandrina has a widowed father that remarries. His new wife has two daughters and she mistreats Alejandrina. One day, her father has to go on a trip, and asks what he can bring them when he returns. His step-daughters ask for dress and a sombrero, while Alejandrina asks for "three roses of Alexandría". Her father loses his way, and an old woman directs him to a garden where he can find the three roses. Alejandrina is given the roses and puts them in a vase. Suddenly, a little bird comes to her and begs her to talk to him. Meanwhile, Alejandrina's step-mother goes to the palace and lies to the king that she boasted she can wash the clothes of the entire army in one night. The king summons Alejandrina and orders her to fulfill the task. The little bird helps her. Next, the step-mother lies that she can find the prince's lost baby blanket. The little bird also produces the blanket. Lastly, the step-mother lies that Alejandrina can find the king's lost ring. Alejandrina goes back home and dresses in black garments. The little bird asks her what is wrong, and the girl tells him she is grieving. The little bird becomes a prince, takes Alejandrina to his father, the king, and marries her. The tale was republished as Las tres rosas de Alejandría ("The Three Roses of Alexandria"), and sourced from a jíbaro teller.

Chilean folklorist Ramón Laval collected a variant from a teller from Santiago, titled La tortilla o El Canarito Encantado ("The Tortilla, or the Little Enchanted Canary"): a princess is visited by a little bird that steals from her a silk scarf, a golden thimble and a pair of golden scissors. The princess falls ill. Elsewhere, Juanito's mother prepares three tortillas that he is to take to the princess to cure her. On his way, the tortillas roll out of the basket and he follows them to a cave. Juanito climbs down the cave and sees three birds coming and becoming princes - the third one the same bird that stole the princess's belongings. Juanito leaves the cave and goes to the palace to inform the princess. The princess begs Juanito to guide her to the cave. He does; down there, the princess finds the bird and tells him she will endure anything thrown her way. The prince directs her to an old witch that lives underground. The princess finds service with the witch, who orders her to perform some tasks: to get the tears of a thousand colibris (hummingbirds), and to take a gem-encrusted casket to the witch's friend. The bird instructs the princess on how to get the tears, and reveals that the casket is a trap: if one opens it, a magical army jumps out of it to kill anyone they see. The bird suggests they deceive the witch and let her open the casket; it happens so and the army strikes the witch to an inch of her life. Barely hanging on, the witch begs the princess to bring her a flask of reviving water, but the bird directs her to another flask, containing a deadly poison. The witch drinks it and dies; the bird becomes a prince and the cave becomes a castle. Laval compared the witch's tasks in this tale to the ones in the Cupid and Psyche myth. Folklorist Terrence Hansen, in his catalogue of Latin American folktales, classified the tale as a new subtype he created, type **428A, related to AaTh 428, "The Wolf". (Note: Tale type AaTh 428, "The Wolf", is considered by scholars as a fragmentary version of the tale of Cupid and Psyche, lacking the initial part about the animal husband and corresponding to the part of the witch's tasks. Accordingly, Uther revised the international classification system and subsumed previous type AaTh 428, "The Wolf" under the new type ATU 425B, "Son of the Witch".)

A Colombian tale was collected from an informant from Barrancas, La Guajira, in La Guajira Department, and archived in the Manuel Zapata Olivella Collection of Vanderbilt University Special Collections. In this tale, titled Las tres hijas del rey ("The King's Three Daughters"), a king has three daughters, Antonia, Cristina and Dalsa. A green bird ("pájaro verde") falls in love with Dalsa and visits her in their garden. One of Dalsa's sisters goes to the king and lies that Dalsa boasted she could wash clothes from the entire city with one bar of soap. Dalsa summons the green bird, who fulfills the task for her. Next, her sister lies that she can go to where God lives and bring back some toys. Dalsa begs for the green bird's help. The green bird comes to her and tells her what she is to do: she must go where God is, enter a escaparate ("cabinet"), get a "cajetilla" ("little box"), and not open it. Dalsa gets the box and escapes with it, but she opens it and "huesitos" ("little bones") jump out of it. She cries for the green bird to help her, he comes and picks up the bones back into the box. Dalsa delivers the little box to her father. Lastly, her sister Cristina declares she wants to marry green bird. Their marriage is arranged and they walk to church, while Dalsa trails behind them with a candle. She says the light of her candle is like her heart, the green bird overhears it and marries Dalsa.

In a Venezuelan tale titled Pájaro Verde, Ramo de Amor ("Green Bird, Branch of Love"), a rich man loses his ships, leaving him only one. He plans to go on a business trip, and asks his three daughters where he can get them: the elder asks for a dress, the middle one for a pair of shoes, and the youngest for three white flowers. He searches high and low and finally finds a bush of white flowers. He leans down to get some, and a voice tells him to get only three, and his daughter has but to burn each of them and call for "Pájaro Verde, Ramo de Amor". Rosenda, the man's youngest daughter, gets the flowers and burns one of them; a little bird comes to talk to her, but she remains silent. Rosenda burns the remaining flowers and the bird comes, but she says no word to him. The next morning, her father expels her from home and she has to sell bread for a living, until one day the queen buy some from her and invites her to come to the castle with her. However, a jealous Black slave begins to spread lies about Rosenda: first, the black slave tells the king she can gather all the clothes in the kingdom, wash and iron them. Next, she says Rosenda can get him a plate with tears from all the snakes in the world. Rosenda summons Pájaro Verde to help her in each task. Thirdly, the black slave lies to the king that Rosenda boasted she could get him the "caja de títeres" (box of puppets). Rosenda then summons Pájaro Verde to help her. He comes and, despite her not talking to him, gives her instructions: she is to walk down a certain path until she finds a horse eating bones, and not far behind a dog eating hay; she is give them the correct fodder, then she will come to a house with a fallen door she is to fix, and inside the keeper of the box. Rosenda takes the box with her, despite the keeper commanding the door and the animals to stop her. Lastly, the black slave lies that Rosenda can make the puppets sing and dance for the king. Pájaro Verde comes in and tells her what to do: the monarchs shall walk through the corridor holding candles; Rosenda is to hold one also, next to the window. That same night, they do as the bird instructed. Pájaro Verde perches by the window and says Rosenda's candle looks sad, and she answers that its holder is. The puppets sing and dance; Pájaro Verde turns into a human prince and marries Rosenda.

Ecuadorian author Abdón Ubidia published an Ecuadorian tale from a source in Guayaquil, with the title Pájaro Verde ("Green Bird"). In this tale, a man has two children, Antuquita and Francito. When his wife dies, he marries another woman who has 10 children. One day, the stepmother asks her husband to abandon her stepchildren in a place where the birds do not sing and the rivers do not flow. The two children are taken to such a place, but Antuquita drops heaps of ashes to mark the path and they return home safely. The next time, their father takes them to the jungle, and the girl marks the path with corn nuggets, but the birds eat them. The pair become lost, until they rest beneath a tree. The following day, they find a green bird that provides a house for them, and offers to grant their every wish. Some time later, the bird sleeps with the girl and she becomes pregnant. One day, the green bird offers to take Antuquita to his house, but his brother-in-law opposes it and begins to cry. The bird guides Antuquita through a path and warns her to not let his mother touch her, since his mother has killed every girl he brought home. Antuquita heeds his words and does not let her mother-in-law touch her. She then orders the girl to fetch water for them. Antuquita summons the green bird, who brings her water. Still trying to kill her daughter-in-law, she orders her to bring a feather from every bird in the world, which the green bird provides. Lastly, the woman visits her sister, a witch, and they plan to send the girl to the witch's house to be killed. Thus, the green bird's mother sends the girl to her sister's house for a comb. Unable to summon green bird, Antuquita goes to the witch's house and delouses her, and, while the witch is asleep, she runs away from the house and asks for sticks and stones to open up the path for her to facilitate her escape, including rivers and seas, with them closing after the girl passes to deter the witch. Seeing that her plans failed, Green bird's mother goes into a rage. Finally, when Antuquita is ready to give birth, green bird comes back and tells her to not let herself be touched neither by his mother, nor his aunt, only by his sister. It happens thus and Antuquita's son is born.

==== Dominican Republic ====
Folklorist Manuel José Andrade collected a tale from informant Juliana Arache, in Higüey, Dominican Republic. In this tale, titled Las Flores de Alejandría ("The Flowers of Alexandria"), a girl named María lives with her grandmother. One day, while her father is ready to go to the capital city, she is advised by her grandmother to ask her father for three flowers of Alejandría. María gets the flowers. María's elder sisters decides to visit her grandmother to see what gift their father brought her, but her grandmother gives her a chocolate drink with a sleeping potion. While her sister is asleep, María puts the flowers in a water vase and a prince comes to court her, but she remains silent. María second sister is also given a chocolate with a sleeping potion, and dozes off, but the third sister declines the drink and breaks a glass window through which the prince comes in. The next time the prince comes in, he hurts himself in the broken glass. The next morning, María and her grandmother go after the prince. As they cross a river during a storm, María manages to cross it, but her grandmother drowns. Maria then overhears the conversation between three witches about how to cure the prince: the witches' blood and empella ('pig's fat') from the hedgehog. María kills the witches and the hedgehog, and brings it as a cure to the prince. Despite saving him, Maria still will not utter a word. All the while, the prince's servants begin to gossip about her, and lie to the queen that María boasted she could wash, iron and sew the clothes of the entire town in a single day. The queen orders the servants to get piles of clothes down to the river for María to wash, but the girl falls down and cry. The prince appears to her, gives her a rod and teaches a magic spell to fulfill the task, by striking the rod three times on the ground and saying that "pájaro de Campo Verde" ("Bird of Green Field") wants to get married. The prince then announces he intends to get married, and asks for maidens to dress in white and carry candles. Maria also goes to the same event, but in black and holding a single candle. The prince approaches her and asks her about the black ensemble, and María answers that her single candle is like her own heart. The prince is glad that María broke his spell, and takes her as his wife.

Folklorist Manuel José Andrade collected a tale from informant Carmen Sánchez from Seibo, Dominican Republic. In this tale, titled Los Princípios de Las Tres Toronjas, a man sends his daughter to the Monte de La Tre Toronja ("Hill of the Three Grapefruits"), where she is to fetch the titular fruits. The girl finds an old woman en route, who advises the girl to enter the hill only when its guardians, a pride of three lions, are asleep with their eyes open. The girl does as instructed and fetches three grapefruits. On the road, she lights up a candle and tosses a fruit into the fire, releasing a prince that bids her talk to him, but she remains silent. Some time later, the girl tosses the second and third fruits into the candle and it generates other princes, and still she utters no word. The girl returns to her mother, who asks her what the fruits produced: three princes. The woman takes the girl, named Siriaca, to the yard and ties her to a pole. The girl then cries out for the help of the "Prínsipe de la Tre Flore de Alejandría", and he appears in person to help her. He talks to her, but she remains silent. Still, the prince rescues Siriaca and takes her with him to be his bridesmaid at his wedding. During the wedding, Siriaca is given a candle. The prince comments on the candle Siriaca holds, noticing it is sad-looking. Siriaca talks for the first time to him, and replies her own heart is also sad. The prince then marries Siriaca.

Folklorist Manuel José Andrade collected a tale from informant Luis Emilio Gerónimo, in Seibo, Dominican Republic. In this tale, titled Mariquita, su novio y la vieja comegente ("Mariquita, her betrothed and the man-eating old woman"), an orphan girl named Mariquita lives with her godmother, who is a man-eating old woman. Mariquita grows up and finds a boyfriend named Miro. However, her godmother begins to force her to do hard chores and find impossible things, but Miro is wiser than Mariquita's godmother. One day, she orders the girl to wash and iron some clothes. Mariquita returns in the afternoon and her godmother asks her if she saw Miro, which the girl denies. Every thing Mariquita is ordered to find for her godmother, she cries, when Miro appears to her with a guitar to help her. On one occasion, her godmother asks her to find crystalline water, which he provides by singing on his guitar. Thirdly, she orders her to gather feathers from little birds and mockingbirds ("sinsonte"), which Miro provides with his guitar. Soon enough, Mariquita and Miro decide to escape from the godmother by placing some drops of saliva to answer for them while they run away. However, the godmother discovers the ruse and rushes after them. Miro and Mariquita then throw behind them some soap, which becomes a wild wave, and a comb, which becomes a hedge of thorns. The godmother, unable to reach them, curses Mariquita not to bear any child until she lets out a laugh. In time, Mariquita and Miro marry and she is pregnant. Miro rides next to the godmother's house and sings that Mariquita has born a child. The godmother lets out a laugh at the impossibility of it, thus breaking the curse. Spanish scholars Julio Camarena and Maxime Chevalier, in their joint Spanish Folktale Index, classified the tale as subtype 425B, Las labores difíciles.

=== Brazil ===
In a Brazilian tale titled História de Dom Birro (Portuguese: "The Tale of Dom Birro") or Dom Birro, collected in Ceará, a young girl lives with her parents. One day, she plays in the nearby woods, but she gets lost and loses her away home. Fortunately, a "turco" ('Turkish man') finds the girl and takes her with him to raise. When the girl is 18 years old, the Turkish man marries the girl, and they have a daughter named Maria. The daughter is abandoned by a black slave in another forest, but she is found by a man named Dom Birro, who takes her to live with him, his stepmother and his step-sister Joana. The stepmother gives Maria some pillows and orders her to go into the forest and fill them with "pena de passarinho" (feathers from little birds), for the prince's upcoming wedding. Next, the stepmother gives Maria a small bottle and orders her to fill it with "lágrima de passarim" (tears from little birds). Dom Birro tells her to sleep, and fulfills the tasks for her. On seeing both tasks fulfilled, the woman supposes Maria had Dom Birro's help, but the latter swears she did not. The next day, the stepmother orders Maria to pay a visit to the stepmother's old mother and get from there a candle for Dom Birro's wedding. However, the path is fraught with dangers: a man-eating bull on the road, and two fierce dogs in the old woman's house. Maria cries over the task, until Dom Birro appears to her and advises on how to proceed: he gives her a green twig to be given to the bull, and a piece of meat to be thrown to the dogs. Maria follows his advice and brings the candle to the stepmother's house. Lastly, the stepmother orders Maria to hold the candle (which has a bomb inside) all night next to the prince and the princess. At midnight, the prince, Dom Birro, asks Joana, his bride, to replace Maria in holding the candle. Joana agrees and lets Maria rest. The booby-trapped candle explodes on Joana's face and burns her clothes. Joana calls for her mother's help and they jump into a pond near the house, but they drown. Dom Birro is free to marry Maria.

== See also ==
- La Fada Morgana (Catalan folk tale)
- Los Tres Claveles (Spanish folktale)
- The Castle of Return and No Return
- Es Negret
