= Los Tres Claveles =

Spanish folktale from Badajoz

Los Tres Claveles (English: The Three Carnations) is a Spanish folktale from Extremadura collected by folklorist Sérgio Hernandez de Soto in Zafra, Badajoz. In the story, a poor girl works as a queen's servant, who, tricked by envious maidservants, orders the girl to accomplish impossible tasks, which she does with the secret help of the queen's son.

It is related to the cycle of the Animal as Bridegroom and distantly related to the Graeco-Roman myth of Cupid and Psyche, in that the heroine is forced to perform difficult tasks for a witch.

== Publication ==
The tale was first published by Sérgio Hernandez de Soto in El folk-lore frexnense, in 1883, and sourced to a female relative, who derived it from "family tradition".

Writer Elsie Spicer Eells translated the tale as The Carnation Youth, in her book Tales of Enchantment from Spain, albeit making the third prince an only son. In Eells's version, the flower the heroine burns is a pink carnation, and the prince tells her to find him "among the rocks of the whole world". The tale was also translated to German as Die drei Nelken, to Russian as "Три гвоздики" ("Three Carnations"), to Italian as I tre garofani, and to Hungarian as A három szegfű.

== Summary ==
A poor laborer has a daughter. One day, he finds in the fields three carnations and brings them to his daughter. One of the carnations ("claveles") falls in the fire, and a prince appears to her. The youth tries to talk to her, but she does not answer, and he tells her she will have to seek him in the "piedras de toito el mundo" ("the rocks of all the world"). The second and the third claveles also fall in the fire, and summon a second and a third princes. María, the girl, falls in love with the third prince and decides to look for the rocks of all the world. María climbs a large rock and begins to cry.

Suddenly, a rock cracks open and the third prince appears to comfort her, but she still does not talk to him. Still, the prince directs her to a house in the valley, where she can find work as a maidservant. María goes there and is hired as a servant. María earns her employer's trust, but the jealousy of the other servants. For this, they lie María can wash all the clothes in the house. María takes the clothes' piles to the river and goes to the rocks to cry. The third prince appears to her and advises her to summon all birds of the world to help her. Next, the servants lie that María can restore the lady of the house's sight, since, according to the story, she cried so much after her losing her three sons. The third prince advises María to summon all the birds again, and every one of them will carry a drop in their feathers to fill the flask.

Lastly, the maidservants lie that María promised to disenchant the mistress's three sons. The third prince advises María to gather all the maidens from the neighbouring villages, have each carry a lit candle, form a procession around the rocks, and must not let any candle be put out. María follows his orders and a procession circles the rocks, but a gust of wind snuffs out María's candle and she shouts. The three rocks disappear and the three princes are back to normal. The third prince explains that the one who burned the carnation should talk to him, in order to break the spell. María marries the third prince.

== Analysis ==
=== Tale type ===
The tale was classified as type 425B, Las Labores Difíciles ("The Difficult Tasks"), based on the Catalogue of Spanish Folktales devised by Julio Camarena and Maxime Chevalier.

In his monograph about Cupid and Psyche, Jan-Öjvind Swahn classified Los Tres Claveles ("The Three Carnations") as subtype 425A of his analysis, that is, "Cupid and Psyche", being the "oldest" and containing the episode of the witch's tasks. In the international Aarne-Thompson-Uther Index, however, Swahn's typing is indexed as type ATU 425B, "The Son of the Witch": the heroine is forced to perform tasks for a witch or her mother-in-law, but she is secretly helped by her husband or love interest.

== Variants ==
=== El príncipe encantado ===
In an Extremaduran tale titled El príncipe encantado ("The Enchanted Prince"), collected from an informant named Filomena Moreno Pozo, from Zalamea de la Serena, a traveller marries a merchant's daughter, who asks for three dresses as wedding gifts: a white one, a "colorado", and a black one. In time, the couple have a daughter with the same colours as the dresses. However, the woman dies, but advises her to remarry if their daughter agrees to it. Time passes; his daughter grows up and meets a widow with two daughters. The widow convinces the girl to arrange for the marriage to the girl's father. It happens thus. Some time later, the traveller bring gifts for his daughter and stepdaughters. One day, his own daughter asks for a three-leaf carnation. The man travels far and cannot find it, but is advised to look for the flower in a magic castle just outside the village. The man returns with the carnation and gives it to his daughter, who places it in her hair. Later, a king passes by with his retinue through the village, and he sights the girl with the carnation on her hair. He falls in love with her, she gives out a scream and says she wants to see him again, but he tells she can meet him in the castle of the Lions ("castillo de los Leones"). With this, he disappears, and his retinue do not know where he went. They know he is in the castle of the Lions, but those that enter it cannot leave. Meanwhile, the girl decides to pluck one of the carnation's petals; she does it and a voice asks the girl, named María, to talk to them. María faints, and is helped by her stepfamily. María plucks the next two petals, and believes it to be her mother's voice. The stepmother admonishes her for her deed, and she leaves home. María goes to look for a job in a castle, and is hired as a maidservant, working in the garden and teaching sewing to the two princesses. She also notices that the queen keeps muttering about her lost son, and one night, in bed, she realizes the prince has been enchanted into the carnation. Suddenly, the prince's voice talks to her, and tells her he can disenchant him: first, she is to ask the queen for every cloth, which she is to wash in a single day. Her orders are carried out, and María, following the prince's voice, simply rests for a bit, and the clothes are washed, ironed and folded. Next, the queen comments she would feel happier with her husband's ring, lost at sea. For the second task, the prince advises María to guide some soldiers to the sea, then enter the water on a horse, and raise her sword. María puts on a man's disguise ("jinete", in the original), rides the horse into the sea, and brings back the queen's ring. Lastly, the queen sighs and wishes to be with her son again, and María offers to bring him back. The prince's voice advises her how to rescue him: she is to gather bones and bring two brushes with herself to the castle of the Lions; she is to give the brushes to two people cleaning up an oven and the bones to two lions; she will then meet a witch who will say the girl dropped a kerchief, whom she is to shove into the ground. María does as instructed and meets the prince in a pavilion just past the witch. The prince embraces María and both escape through a backdoor, while the castle of the Lions becomes filled with smoke. The pair returns to the castle, and the queen thanks María for saving her son. María and the prince marry. The tale was classified as type 425B, Las Labores Difíciles ("The Difficult Tasks").

=== Les pedres del Cap del Món ===
In a Catalan language tale published by author Joan Amades with the title Les pedres del Cap del Món ("The Rocks of The End of the World"), a girl named Maria asks her father to bring her three roses. Her father finds three beautiful red roses. The girl takes the roses and tosses them in the fire, one at a time, causing a prince to appear and talk to her, but she remains silent. The image then tells her to find him at the "Pedres del Cap del Món" and vanishes. Maria then tosses the remaining flowers into the fire, producing images of a prince that ask her to find them at the stones at the end of the world. Maria falls in love with the first prince she summoned, and decides to search for such a location. She reaches a mountaintop with three large stones, and begins to cry. Suddenly, the first prince comes out of the stone and comforts Maria, advising her to reach a nearby house by the shore and find work there as a maidservant. Maria does as instructed and hires herself at the house, where an old lady lives. Maria earns the ire of the lady's hundred servants, who begin to lie to her that Maria could do impossible tasks: first, that Maria could wash the clothes for a hundred maids in one morning. Maria goes to cry at the rocks, when the prince appears again and advises the girl to go to the shore and cry out for all the birds. Maria does as instructed and many species of birds come to help her. Next, the envious maidservants lie to the old lady Maria promised to sew five dresses for each of the maids and a hundred more for her. Maria goes to cry by the rocks, and the prince advises her to summon the birds again: it happens thus and thousands of birds come to help Maria spin, sew and weave the innumerous clothes. Lastly, the maidservants lie that Maria boasted she could bring the old lady's lost sons back. Maria goes to cry at the stones, and the same youth appears to advise her: gather all local maidens, who are to put on white dresses, walk in procession and have them carry lit atxas which cannot be put out. Maria tells the old lady to does as the youth advised and the maidens go to the stones to circles them. As soon as the girls make the third round, a sudden strong wind blows out Maria's atxa. She curses the wind, and suddenly the large stones revert to three youths, the same youths that appeared from burning the three roses. The youngest youth then explains the three are brothers turned into stones by a sorcerer, but they were given three red roses; and they could only be disenchanted if a girl named Maria cursed near the stones; that is why the youths helped Maria by sending the bird helpers, which they "rule and command". Maria is free to choose the youth she wants to marry. Amades sourced the tale from an informant in Barcelona named Maria de la Castanya, in 1922. Swahn classified Amades's tale as subtype 425A of his analysis, that is, "Cupid and Psyche", being the "oldest" and containing the episode of the witch's tasks. In the international index, however, Swahn's typing is indexed as type ATU 425B, "The Son of the Witch". Hispanists Julio Camarena and Maxime Chevalier classified Amades's tale as type 425B, Las Labores Difíciles ("The Difficult Tasks").

=== El Príncipe Enamorado ===
In a Spanish tale from Salamanca published by Hispanists Julio Camarena and Maxime Chevalier with the title El Príncipe Enamorado ("The Enamoured Prince"), a merchant has a daughter named Elena to whom he brings roses whenever he comes back from the market. One day, however, the man forgets about it, then meets another man to whom he explains he brings roses to his daughter Elena. The second man goes to Elena's house and calls for her from under the balcony, but she does not answer. The man goes back the following mornings, and still she does not answer. One day, Elena decides she wants to leave home to be a servant elsewhere. Her parents agree with her decision and she departs. The girl eventually knocks on the house of the man who tried to talk to her under her balcony and offers her services; the man's mother denies her at first, for they have other maidservants, but the man vouches for Elena and the girl is hired. In time, the other four maidservants notice their employer only has eyes for Elena, and begin to spread gossip about her: first, that she can wash every mattress in the palace. The woman (the queen) arranges for a cart loaded with mattresses to be delivered to Elena. On the road, the prince appears and tries to talk to her, but she remains silent. Still, he gives her a wand of virtue and teaches her a spell to go to the riverbank and summon the birds to help her wash and dry them. It happens thus. The next time, the maidservants lie to the queen that Elena boasted she could fill every mattress in the palace with bird feathers. Elena takes a new cart loaded with mattresses and meets the prince, who advises her to go to the sea and summon the birds for them to offer their feather and fill the mattresses. After doing the second task, the prince's grandmother dies, and falls under a spell, and there is a little box guarded by animals and an old man sitting on the box that is holding the prince's grandmother. The maidservants then tell the queen Elena can fetch them the box. Elena cries for the task; the prince appears to her and bids her talk to him, and still she remains silent. Despite this, the prince gives her a house key, some meat for wolves and some milk for some snakes. Elena steals the box and rushes back to the palace, the old man commanding the animals to stop her, to no avail. Elena delivers the box to the queen, who, pleased with the girl's success, wishes to marry her to her son. The next day, the queen arranges for her son's wedding and places Elena on his right, while the prince's bride on his left. The maidservants hold candles, while Elena holds a melted "cirio". The prince takes notice of the sad-looking candle in Elena's hand and she tells him that sadder still is the person holding it. The prince then announces he will marry Elena instead of his bride.

=== Los hermanos convertidos en piedras ===
In a tale collected in Guadalix de la Sierra from an informant named Máxima Gamo Garcia, with the title Los hermanos convertidos en piedras ("The Brothers Turned to Stone"), a ploughman has a beautiful daughter. One day, he finds three carnations on the road which he brings her. Some years later, the man dies, and the girl's carnations are as fresh as the first day she gained them. Now all alone, she plans to leave and find work elsewhere. She then throws a carnation in the fire, which makes a youth appears to her. The prince asks if she needs something, she remains silent, and the youth tells her to seek him in the "piedras de las tres hermanas". After the youth disappears, she suspects something about the flowers, and throws the other two in the fire, with two other youths appearing before her and telling her to seek them in the same location. After exhausting the three flowers, the girl decides to go to the "piedras de las tres hermanas", and stops by the rocks. The third youth appears to her, to whom she explains she is looking for a job. The youth then points her to a house in a valley, where they are looking for a maidservant. Following the youth's directions, the girl knocks on the house's door and is welcomed as a servant. One of the house's servants gives the newcomer a huge pile of clothes to be washed. The girl goes near the rocks; the eldest of the three brothers comes out of the rock, is told about the task, and advises her to go near the riverbank and summon the birds to help her. It happens thus. Some time later, the other servant lies to the lady of the house the newcomer can find her a remedy for her eyesight. The girl goes to the rocks; one of the youth appears and directs the girl to a bramble where the birds will give her their tears to fill a flask, and she is to pluck a feather from the last bird to use it on the lady's eyes. The third time, the servants lie to their employer the girl can disenchant the lady's missing three sons. The girl returns to the rocks and meets a youth, who instructs her to gather a hundred maidens from the village, have each carry a candle and circle around the rocks, and they will be disenchanted. The girl arranges for the hundred maiden retinue, each holding a candle. They circle around the rocks and restore the youths to human form. The girl marries the lady's elder son. The tale was also classified as type 425B, Las Labores Difíciles ("The Difficult Tasks").

=== The Silent Young Woman ===
In a Spanish tale collected by Philippe Soupault and Ré Soupault with the title La Jeune Fille silencieuse ("The Silent Young Woman"), on a spring day, a peasant that lives near Toledo brings three carnations to his daughter, one yellow, one pink and a third red. For days, the carnations keep their freshness despite many days have passed, and one day, the girl goes to take the flowers to her lips, when she does a sudden move and the yellow carnation falls into the hearth. Suddenly, a youth in yellow clothes appears and asks her what she wants, but she remains silent, so he tells her to seek him in near the stones that wait for them beyond the hill ("près des pierres qui nous attendent loin d'ici, au-delà de la colline"). The girl takes the second flower, of a pink colour, and tosses it into the fire, generating another youth, in pink clothes, that makes the same question, but vanishes. Finally, she tosses the red carnation into the fire and a youth in red clothes appears to her with the same question and bids her find him at the same location as the others, then vanishes. The girl thinks about the third youth in red clothes, and decides to go after him in the stones beyond the hill. After a long journey, she reaches three large stones next to a hill, kneels down and cries. The youth in red clothes comes out of the stones, asks her why she is crying, then directs her to a nearby mansion where she can find job with the local lady. The girl does as instructed and hires herself as a new maidservant to the lady, who begins to like her more than the other servants. Due to this, the maidservants begin to feel jealous towards the newcomer, and lie to their lady that the girl boasted she could wash the whole laundry ("linge", in the original) of the mansion in a single day. The lady sends for the girl and orders her to wash the laundry, otherwise she can leave and never return. The girl goes to cry near the three stones, when the youth in red clothes appears and advises her to go near the river and call out to all the birds of the world, and they will come to help her. It happens thus, and many birds come to wash, iron, fold and dry the laundry. Next, the maidservants lie that the girl boasted she could bring the water that can heal the lady's eyesight, which she lost after a sorcerer took away her three sons. The girl cries near the stones, the red youth appears to her, gives her a glass cup and advises her to go near the river, summon the birds again and they will offer her their tears, then the last bird will molt a single feather which she is to use to dip in the water and apply the remedy on the lady's eyes. It happens thus, and the lady's eyesight is cured. Lastly, the servants' jealousy has reached new heights, and they spread the rumour that the girl boasted she could help disenchant the youths from the sorcerer's spell. The lady summons the girl and orders her to disenchant her sons. The girl goes to cry next to the stones, when the third youth appears to her and advises her to gather all maidens from around the place, everyone should hold a candle and circle the three stones three times, and the candles cannot be put out. The girl gathers the maidens, who each hold a candle and circle the stones. When the girl goes to finish the third lap around the stones, the wind blows and puts out her candle, causing her to cry that her candle is out. Suddenly, the three stones are restored back into the three youth. The youngest youth, the one in red, thanks the girl for talking, and explains that a sorcerer cursed them into three carnations and they could only be released if the one who burned the carnations uttered a word in front of the stones. The three youths return to their mother, the local lady, and the third youth marries the girl who disenchanted him. The girl forgives the other maidservants.

== See also ==
- La Fada Morgana (Catalan folk tale)
- Pájaro Verde (Mexican folktale)
- Prunella (fairy tale)
- The Little Girl Sold with the Pears
