= Inger Margrethe Boberg =

Inger Margrethe Boberg (July 23, 1900 – May 9, 1957) was a Danish folklore researcher and writer. She studied philology at the University of Copenhagen and received her Master's degree in 1925. In 1927, she stayed at Lund University with the folklore professor Carl Wilhelm von Sydow. In 1934, she obtained the Dr. Phil. degree in folkloristics as the first woman in Denmark. From 1932 to her death, she was archivist at the Danish Folklore archive (Dansk Folkemindesamling). However, during many years, she had to occasionally take temporary jobs as a school teacher in order to provide a living for herself. Not until 1952, when she had a long-established name in international folkloristics, she obtained a steady position.

In 1945, she received the Tagea Brandt Rejselegat. The prize enabled her to embark on a study trip to the U.S., where she worked with Stith Thompson and co-edited his Motif-Index of Folk-Literature.

== Selected works ==
- Boberg, I.M. (1928). "Prinsessen på glasbjoerget". In: Danske Studier (1928): 16-53.
- Boberg, I.M. (1938). "The Tale of Cupid and Psyche". In: Classica et Medievalia 1: 177-216.
- Boberg, I.M. (1943). "Die Sage von Vermund und Uffe". In: Acta Philologica Scandinavica 16: 129-57.
- Boberg, I.M. (1953). Folkemindeforskningens historie i Mellem- og Nordeuropa [The history of Folkloristics in Central and Northern Europe]. København: Munksgaard, 382 pp. Danmarks Folkeminder vol. 60.
- Boberg, I.M. (1955). Baumeistersagen. FF communications 151: 1-24.
- Boberg, I.M. (1966). Motif-index of early Icelandic literature. Copenhagen: Munksgaard, 263 pp. Bibliotheca Arnamagnæana vol. 27.
