= The Little Girl Sold with the Pears =

Italian fairy tale

"The Little Girl Sold with the Pears" (Italian: La bambina venduta con le pere) is an Italian fairy tale published by Italo Calvino in Italian Folktales, from Piedmont. Ruth Manning-Sanders included a variant, as "The Girl in the Basket", in A Book of Ogres and Trolls.

It is related to the cycle of the Animal as Bridegroom and distantly related to the Graeco-Roman myth of Cupid and Psyche, in that the heroine is forced to perform difficult tasks for a witch.

== Synopsis ==
Once there was a man had to pay the king rent in the form of four baskets of pears. One year his trees yielded only three and a half baskets full, so he put his youngest daughter in the fourth basket to fill it up. When the baskets arrived at the castle, the royal servants found the girl by the pears she ate, and they set her to work as a servant. As the girl, named Perina (from pear), grew up, she and the prince fell in love, which caused the other maidservants to grow envious. In Manning-Sanders's version, the servants told the king that she had boasted of doing all the laundry in one day and succeeded with the prince's aid. In most other versions, the maids then tell the king that she had also boasted that she could steal the witch's (or ogress's, depending on the version) treasure. The king insisted that she do it.

In Manning-Sanders's version the prince told her what to do. Although Calvino found this in his original version, to increase her identification with the pears, she went and passed by an apple tree and a peach tree to sleep in the third, a pear tree. In the morning, a little old woman was under the tree.

In both cases, they gave her grease, bread, and millet. She went on, gave the millet to three women in a bakery, sweeping out the ovens with their hair, threw the bread to some mastiffs, crossed by a red river with a charm that the little old woman had given her, and greased the hinges of the witch's house. Then she took the treasure chest. The chest began to speak, but the door refused to slam on her, the river to drown her, the dogs to eat her, and the women in the bakery to bake her.

Curious, she opened the chest and a golden hen with her chicks escaped, or musical instruments that played on their own, but the little old woman or prince put them back. The prince told her to ask, for her reward, for the coal chest in the cellar. When she asked and it was brought up, the prince was hidden in it, so they married.

== Sources ==
The tale was originally collected by Italian scholar Domenico Comparetti with the title Margheritina, and sourced from Monferrato. It was later translated by German writer Paul Heyse into German.

The tale was reworked by Calvino, who changed the girl's name from Margheritina to Perina to reinforce the fruit connection. He also added the old woman helper who gives the objects to the girl, while, in the original tale, the girl is helped by the prince.

== Publication ==
The tale was republished by writer Jane Yolen as Brave Marietta.

== Analysis ==
=== Tale type ===
In a review of Calvino's work, folklorist Walter Anderson classified the tale, according to the international Aarne-Thompson-Uther Index, as type AaTh 428, "The Wolf". Swedish scholar Jan-Öjvind Swahn also classified the original tale as type AaTh 428.

Calvino's tale (numbered 11 in his collection) was listed by Italian scholars Alberto Maria Cirese and Liliana Serafini under type AaTh 428, Il Lupo ("The Wolf"). Renato Aprile, editor of the Italian Catalogue of Tales of Magic, classifies Margheritina as type AT 428, Il Lupo ("The Wolf"), but recognizes that it contains motifs from type AT 328, Tridicino ("Thirteenth"), where the protagonist is spurred to action by envious courtiers.

Tale type AaTh 428 is considered by scholars as a fragmentary version of the tale of Cupid and Psyche, lacking the initial part about the animal husband and corresponding to the part of the witch's tasks. Accordingly, German folklorist Hans-Jörg Uther revised the international classification system and subsumed type AaTh 428 under new type ATU 425B, "Son of the Witch".

== Variants ==
=== The Bought One ===
Author Angelo de Gubernatis collected a tale from Santo Stefano di Calcinaia with the title La comprata ("The Bought One"). In this tale, a couple accidentally sells a fruits basket with their daughter inside, which is bought by another couple. The second couple's son and the girl fall in love and plan to marry, but the boy's mother is against their marriage, and imposes tasks on the girl: first, the girl is to separate the legumes mixed inside in a granary. With the help of an old lady, she fulfills the task. Next, the woman orders the girl to sew, wash and weave one hundred pounds of hemp in a single month. The same old lady appears to her, joined by three other ladies with large body parts, and they fulfill the task. Still trying to separate the enamoured couple, the woman curses her son to become a pig. The old lady appears to the girl and tells her how to disenchant her beloved. Following the lady's advice, she walks down a path and passes by a gate whose hinges she blesses; then by a woman pulling a bucket of water with her hair, to whom she gives a rope; gives two brooms to two women that are sweeping the floor with their tongues; gives a rag to a third woman that is cleaning an oven with her breasts; and gives some meat to two lions. Finally, she arrives at the house of a mago ('sorcerer') that is guarding his treasure with his eyes open (which is their way of sleeping). The girl steals the mago's treasure and runs back, the obstacles in their way allowing her passage. The mago wakes up and, not seeing his treasure, dies. The boy's mother also dies, and his transformation is reversed, allowing him to marry his beloved.

=== Melarosa ===
In an Italian tale collected by Ciro Marzocchi in Siena with the title Melarosa, a poor man has many children, among which a girl named Melarosa. One day, the girl hides in one of the fruit baskets under a tree and her father accidentally sells the basket she was in, along with others, to the queen. Melarosa ends up in the queen's castle, whose son, the prince, is missing. The queen adopts Melarosa, spurring the jealousy of the ladies in court. The jealous ladies lie to the queen that Melarosa boasted that she could steal some possessions of Fata Morgana: first, her sieve; next, the "scatola degli artisti" ('box of artists'), and finally the "cassa del sole e della luna" ('box of the Sun and the Moon'), which contains a clock. Melarosa meets a young man, a prince, who offers his help and advice in the tasks: he advises her to bless the people and objects on the road to Fata Morgana (bakers, women, dogs and gates). After getting the last item, the box of the sun and the moon, Fata Morgana goes after Melarosa, but the gates kill the witch. Back at the palace, the sun and the moon dance and, to the chime of the clock, the prince, the queen's lost son and the one that helped Melarosa, appears to them, since Fata Morgana has been defeated and his curse is broken. Melarosa then marries the prince.

=== Nina-delle-mele ===
In another Italian tale collected by Marzocchi in Contado di Siena with the title Nina-delle-mele, a girl named Nina-delle-mele is accidentally sold by her poor father, a fruit seller, to the queen inside a basket of apples. The queen takes a liking to the girl, spurring the envy of other ladies, who begin to spread false rumours about Nina-delle-mele. First, the companions lie to the queen that Nina-delle-mele boasted that she could sweep the floors of the palace in a single night; next, that she could do the laundry of the entire castle in one night; lastly, that she could bring back a pillow that belongs to Fata Morgana. With the help of a young man who falls in love with her, she accomplishes the tasks: the young man is a prince, leaves a wardrobe and asks Nina-delle-mele for a kiss, which is denied. Still, he helps the girl: with the aid of a magic wand, the prince fulfills the first two tasks for her. As for the third task, he advises Nina-delle-mele on how to proceed on the road to Fata Morgana, by acting with kindness towards the servants she finds on the path. Nina-delle-mele steals the witch's pillow, and Fata Morgana kills herself. Back to the queen, Nina-delle-mele asks for the wardrobe as her reward. The young man comes out of it and reveals he is the queen's son, kidnapped years ago by Fata Morgana. He then marries Nina-delle-mele.

=== The Chicken with Golden Chicks ===
In a tale collected in the Bergamasque dialect from informant Celinia Grassi, from Schilpario, and translated as La chioccia dai pulcini d'oro ("The Chicken with Golden Chicks"), in a poor family, a father and a mother have many children, but live in poverty. One day, the man goes to the meadows to pluck apples to sell and returns home. His youngest son goes to tell the man that a little girl has just been born. The man worries about not being able to feed all of the children, and ponders about selling his children. However, he decides to have his baby daughter to be devoured, places her in a basket of apples and pretends to be selling them. The man passes by the king's palace and peddles his fruits, when the little prince asks his mother to buy the man's apples. The queen says they have apple trees that yield fruits in their garden, but the boy wants those of the basket. The man sells the basket to the palace, places it in the kitchen, and leaves, glad to have sold his daughter. The kitchen servants begin to empty the basket and hear the baby's cry, then find the little girl. The servants call the queen, who sees the baby and decides to adopt her as a companion to the prince. The girl grows up and becomes beautiful. However, the palace's servants are jealous of the treatment the queen gives her, being treated like a royal while they are still servants, and hatch a plan: they know that there is a witch that lives in some woods who owns a chicken with golden chicks, and who has killed anyone who tried to steal it; so they lie to the king that the girl boasted she could steal it. The king sends for her and says she is to bring back the witch's chicken with golden chicks. The girl says she never said such a thing and cries for the task. Suddenly, an old woman comes out of a closet and advises the girl how to proceed: ask the king for a horse, a bag of meat, a bag of bread, some lard, a box of needles, a box of thimbles and a bundle of brooms; she is to reach the witch's house at noon, when the witch is having her meal, steal the chick atop the table, and return; and as reward she is to ask the king for this very wardrobe as her reward. The girl tells the king, is given the objects and goes to the forest entrance, where she meets the same old woman. The old woman then tells the girl to enter the woods, where she will find a pair of rusty gates on which is to use the lard. The girl finds the gates and smears the hinges with the lard, then throws the meat to some emaciated cats, the bread to some dogs, gives the needles to some maidens sewing with their fingers, the brooms to some people sweeping the floor with their tongues. The tale explains these people are those that tried to steal the witch's chicken, and are now placed as obstacles. When the clock rings noon, the witch goes to have her meal, when the girl steals the basket with the chicken from the witch's table. The witch then calls her servants to stop the thief, but they stay their hand due to her kind actions. She takes the horse and rides back to the palace. The servants are dumbstruck that the girl returned with the chick and the chickens, and the king is astounded with what she is to give to the girl as reward. The girl asks for the wardrobe as reward, opens it and the prince himself is inside, being locked up by the old woman. The girl marries the prince. Collectors Marino Anesa and Mario Rondi classified the tale as type AaTh 428, "Il Lupo" ("The Wolf").

== See also ==
- La Fada Morgana (Catalan folk tale)
- Prunella
- The Tale about Baba-Yaga (Russian fairy tale)
- The Man and the Girl at the Underground Mansion
- The King of Love
- Pájaro Verde (Mexican folktale)
- Boots and the Troll
- Dapplegrim
- The Enchanted Canary
- The Magic Swan Geese
- The Old Witch
- The Three Aunts
- The Witch
- Thirteenth
