= Graciosa and Percinet =

French literary fairy tale written by Madame d'Aulnoy

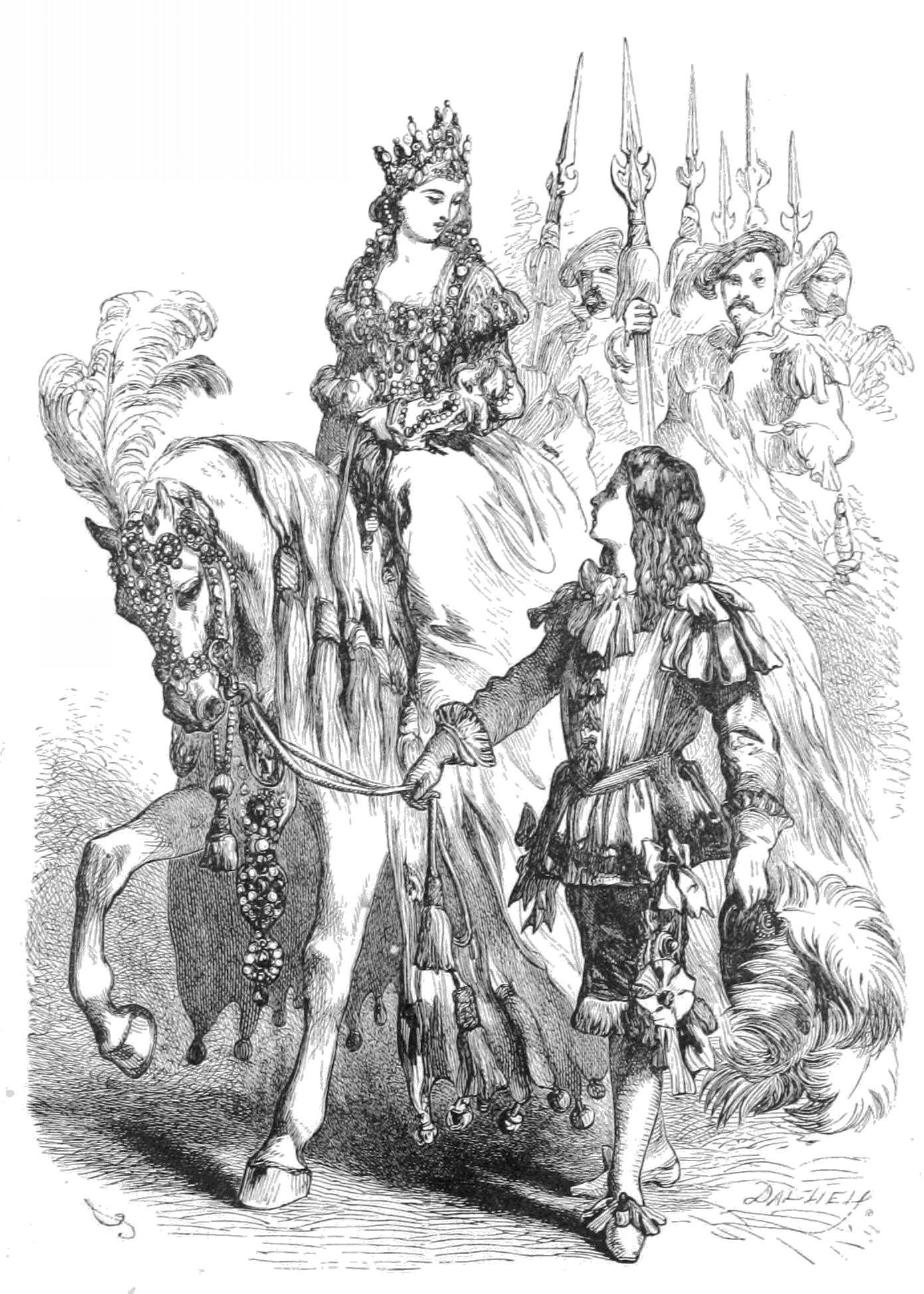
Gracieuse and Percinet, illustration by John Gilbert (1856)

"Graciosa and Percinet" (French: Gracieuse et Percinet) is a French literary fairy tale by Madame d'Aulnoy. Andrew Lang included it in The Red Fairy Book.

Although the tale has a literary origin, being penned by d'Aulnoy, scholars recognize in the narrative motifs and elements from the Graeco-Roman myth of Cupid and Psyche and, by extension, of the Animal as Bridegroom cycle of stories.

== Synopsis ==
A king and queen had a beautiful and virtuous daughter, Graciosa (lit. 'graceful' and 'gracious'), and within their royal court there was an ugly duchess, Duchess Grognon, who hated her. One day, the queen died. The king grieved so much that his doctors ordered him to hunt. Weary, he stopped at the duchess's castle and discovered how rich she was. He agreed to marry her for her substantial dowry, even though she demanded control of her stepdaughter.

The princess was reasoned into behaving well by her nurse. A handsome young page, Percinet, appeared. He was a rich young prince with a fairy gift, and he was in her service. He gave her a horse to ride to greet the duchess. It made the duchess's look ugly, and she demanded it, and that Percinet led it as he led it for Graciosa. Nevertheless, the horse ran away, and her disarray made her look even uglier. The duchess had Graciosa beaten with rods, except that the rods were turned into peacock feathers, and she suffered no harm.

The wedding went on, and the king arranged a tournament to flatter the queen. The king's knights overthrew all the challengers, for all the ugliness of the queen, until a young challenger overthrew them and showed the portrait of the princess as the most beautiful woman in the world. The queen then had Graciosa abandoned in the woods. Percinet rescued her, but Graciosa, out of Filial piety, asks to be return to her father. Even when Percinet showed her how the queen had claimed her dead and buried a log of wood in her place, Graciosa still insisted. He told her that she would never see his castle again until she was buried.

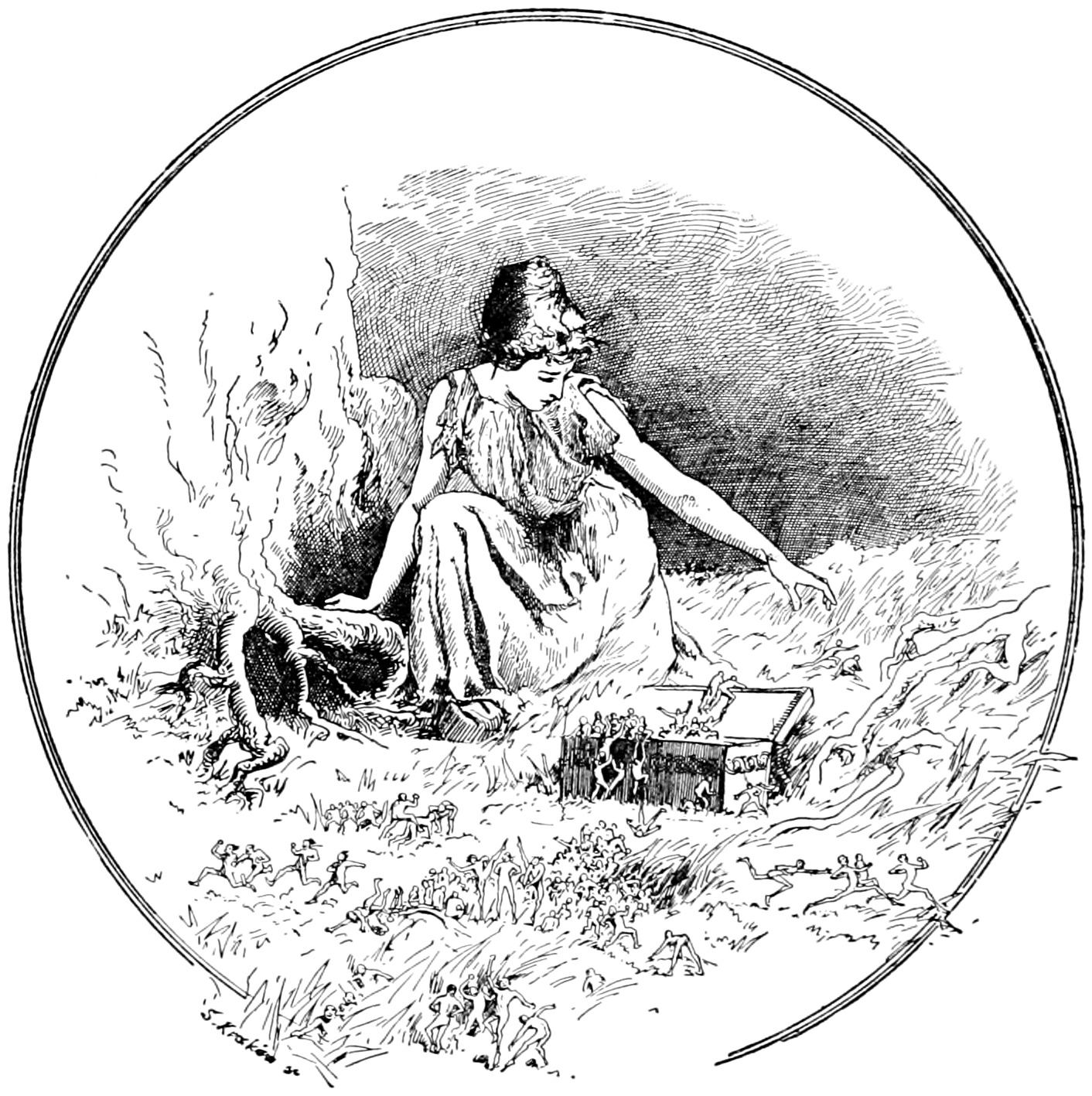
The opened casket releases the small creatures. Illustration by Henry Justice Ford for Andrew Lang's The Red Fairy Book (1890).

The king was glad to see her, but when the queen returned and insisted, he seemed convinced that Graciosa was an imposter, not wishing to lose access to his new queen's seemingly-endless riches. The queen imprisoned Graciosa, and with the aid of a wicked fairy, set her to disentangle a skein, on pain of her life. Graciosa thought Percinet would not aid her, but finally in despair called on him, and he disentangled it. The outraged queen set her to sort a room filled with feathers, and Percinet did that as well. Then the queen set her to bring a box to her own castle, and forbade her to open it. Curiosity got the better of her, and Graciosa freed a swarm of little men and women whom she could not get back in. Percinet helped her. The servants would not admit Graciosa, but gave her a letter telling they would not let her in.

The queen suggested that they lift a stone in the garden, which covered a well, on the grounds she had heard it covered a treasure. When it was up, she pushed Graciosa in, and dropped the stone. Percinet and his mother rescued her, and this time, Graciosa agreed to marry him.

== Excerpt ==
"Once upon a time there was a king and a queen who had an only daughter. Her beauty, her sweet temper, and her wit, which were incomparable, caused them to name her Gracieuse. She was the sole joy of her mother, who sent her every day a beautiful new dress, either of gold brocade, or of velvet, or of satin. She was always magnificently attired, without being in the least proud, or vain of her fine clothes. She passed the morning in the company of learned persons, who taught her all sorts of sciences, and in the afternoon she worked beside the queen. At luncheon time they served up to her basins full of sugar-plums, and more than twenty pots of preserves; so that she was universally considered the happiest princess in the world!"

== Analysis ==
=== Tale type ===
This literary tale can be classified in the Aarne-Thompson-Uther Index as type ATU 425, "The Search for the Lost Husband". Scholar Jacques Barchilon stated that the tale was one of the occurrences of the Animal as Bridegroom cycle of stories (types ATU 425, ATU 425A, ATU 425B and ATU 425C) in d'Aulnoy's works.

French scholars Paul Delarue and Marie-Louise Thèneze, establishers of the French folktale catalogue, follow Jan-Öjvind Swahn's classification: French type 425A (or sous-type A) follows Cupid and Psyche with the tasks; type 425B is the one with the gifts and the three nights. In the international index, however, Swahn's typing A is indexed as type ATU 425B, "The Son of the Witch".

=== Motifs ===
The tasks of princess Graciosa have been compared to those of princess Psyche, the heroine of the Cupid and Psyche myth.

== Variants ==
=== France ===
In a variant from Lorraine collected by comparativist Emmanuel Cosquin with the title Firosette, the titular Firosette loves a human girl named Julie, but his mother, a fairy, wants to marry him to another woman. Firosette's mother tells Julie she will go to church and orders her to empty a well using a sieve. Firosette appears to help her and uses his magic wand to accomplish the task. The next day, Firosette's mother orders her to take a letter to her sister, who lives in Effincourt. Firosette advises Julie that his aunt will offer her a box of laces and ribbons, and she will get the finest one; Julie will choose one, but not wear it; instead, she will tie it around a bush. Julie does that and the bush burns up. Lastly, Firosette's fairy mother marries him to another bride, and forces Julie to hold ten candles between her toes, while in the couple's bedroom. Firosette convinces his bride to change places with Julie. After it happens, Firosette's mother asks from afar if she is ready; her son answers yes, and his mother curses the person who is holding the candles to become food so she can eat it. Firosette's mother realizes her mistake and drops dead. Cosquin and German scholar Ernst Tegethoff noted the partial resemblance of this tale to the second part of the myth of Cupid and Psyche, especially Venus's tasks.

In a tale from Finistère, Lower Brittany, collected by François-Marie Luzel with the title Les Morgans de l’île d’Ouessant ("The Morgens of Ouessant Island") or Mona and the Morgan, a human girl named Mona Kerbili is so beautiful she is compared sometimes to a Morgan (a type of aquatic creature in Breton folklore). Because of this, when she is asked about who she wants to marry, Mona says she won't marry a simple fisherman, but a prince, or even a Morgan himself. An old Morgan - the king - hears her wish and takes her to his underwater palace, intenting on marrying her. However, the son of the Morgan king falls in love with the human girl and wants to marry her, but his father denies him, and tells his son can choose any Morganezed girl in their underwater realm. The Morgan prince is forced to marry a Morganezed girl, while the human girl, Mona, is forced to stay in the palace and prepare the meal for their return from the church. As the retinue march to church, the Morgan prince feigns he forgot his wedding ring back at the palace, and goes back there. He helps Mona with the chores and returns to his marriage ceremony. That same night, after the wedding, the Morgan king forces Mona to hold a candle in her hands until it melts away completely, after which she is to die. After some time, the Morgan prince asks his bride to replace the human girl holding the candle. He hears his father's voice asking if the candle has already melted. He answers "yes": his father enters the room and decapitates the Morganezed bride. The next morning, the Morgan prince tells his father he has sadly become a widowed man overnight, and asks for his permission to marry the human girl, the "daughter of the land". Admitting defeat, the Morgan king lets his son marry the human girl. The tale then continues by delving into their married life, until the human girl longs for her land home and decides to visit her human family. French scholar Paul Sébillot republished the tale with the title Le Morgan et la Fille de la Terre ("The morgan and the daughter of the land"), and it was first published in the newspaper Revue de France, in 1874.

In a Franco-German variant titled Figeois, the titular Figeois lives with three fairies, from whom he learns all magic secrets. The fairies like the human youth, but he only has eyes for a human girl. The fairies get jealous and feign friendship to draw the human to the castle, where they trap the girl. The fairies impose all kinds of work on her, which she accomplishes with Figeois's help. On Sunday, the fairies tell the girl (whom they derisively call Plus-belle-que-Merde) that she is to prepare their food for their return from the Sunday mass, and give her a pot full of mixed up seeds. Figeois gives the girl a magic cane to fulfill the task in no time. That night, the fairies undress the girl and force her to hold a candle until it melts. Seeing the poor girl's suffering, Figeois suggests that the elder fairy replaces her for a short while. Outside the room, the other two fairies command the person holding the candle to perish as soon as the candle is put out. So it happens, and the elder fairy dies. Seeing their mistake the next morning, the remaining fairies die. Figeois gets to keep the castle and live with his human bride.

In a variant from Ariège with the title Courbasset, le Petit Corbeau ("The Little Crow"), a blind old man lives with his three daughters. When the elder daughter goes to the well to draw a bucket of water, a little crow appears to her with a proposal: it can cure her father if she marries him. She refuses. The next day, she and her middle sister meet the crow, and they both decline his offer. Their youngest sister agrees to marry the crow and departs with him. They fly to a castle by nightfall and the crow becomes a man. The girl returns to her family to tell the news and her sisters become jealous. The pair go to the crow's castle and drop wax on his wings. When the crow prince and his wife return, he laments the fact that the wings are ruined, for now she and the prince have to do penance elsewhere. Before he departs, he teaches his wife a helpful command and advises her to prepare seven small and seven large brooms, seven loaves of bread, seven needles and seven jugs of oil. The girl reaches another castle and is forced to do chores for the residents: first, to fill 50 carts with manure. She chants the command her husband taught her and a murder of crows appear to fulfill the task for her. The next day, she is to unload the carts. Lastly, she is sent for the crow prince's grandmother's house to get a diamond from there. On the road, she gives seven loaves of bread to seven dogs, seven needles to seven tailors, the seven large brooms to seven women, enters the house and cleans seven stairs, oils the hinges of seven doors, creeps into the grandmother's room and steals the diamond. The grandmother awakes and commands the stair, the doors, the women, the tailors and the dogs to stop the girl, but she escapes. At the end of the tale, she chooses her husband in a queue of men in front of the castle. The tale was originally collected from the same teller, Marie Arnaud, from Fougax-et-Barrineuf, in two versions: Petit courbeau and Courbasset.

=== Corsica ===
In a Corsican tale collected by linguist Genevieve Massignon from an informant in Ortiporio, with the title Più bella chè fata or Plus belle que fée ("More beautiful than a fairy"), a girl is named "more beautiful than a fairy", which causes the envy of two fairies, who wish to get rid of the girl. As part of their plan, they disguise themselves as poor women and beg for alms. Più bella chè fata gives alms to the poor women, who ask the girl if she can accompany them back home, in exchange for some gifts: a golden distaff, a golden fuse, and a golden spinning wheel. At every leg of the journey, the old women give her the promised objects, until the trio reach the fairies' home. The next day, the fairies assume their original shapes and tell her they will leave, and on their return the house must be half swept, half not swept; the food cooked, but half raw and half uncooked, and the table must be set, but the table must not touch the ground, nor the tablecloth touch the table. The fairies leave. The girl begins to cry, when a youth named Ghjuvanninu della verità ("Petit-Jean de la Vérité") appears and offers his help, in exchange for a kiss. The girl refuses to kiss him, but he helps her anyway: she is to sweep only around each room, but not the middle; cook half of the meat and serve it; place a cardboard between the table and the floor and a piece of paper between the tablecloth and the table. Next, the fairies order her to go to their aunt Luca ("Zia Luca"), a sorceress, and get from there a tamis (a type of sieve). Più bella chè fata cries, but Ghjuvanninu della verità appears to her and advises her on how to proceed: place the correct fodder for the animals (hay for the donkey, bones for the dog), compliment and bless a fountain, stop a door from slamming, enter Zia Luca's house, place some fuses on the steps and shout for her to come down the stairs. Zia Luca steps on the fuses and tumbles down the stairs, while the girl gets the tamis and flees. Zia Luca commands the dog and the donkey to stop her, but the animals refuse. Lastly, the fairies prepare a trap for the duo: they hang a large mace over the rata, which will squash the pair as they pass the baskets of chestnuts. Anticipating their plot, Ghjuvanninu della verità lets loose the large mace on the fairies, who die. Ghjuvanninu della verità then marries Più bella chè fata.

In a Corsican tale collected by Marie-France Orsini-Marzoppi in Cap Corse with the Corsican title Piuttostu more strangulà..., translated to French as Plutôt mourir étranglée... ("[I Would] Rather Die Strangled..."), a woman has a son who falls in love with their servant, a young and beautiful maiden. However, the woman dislikes her son's fondness for the maidservant and wishes to see him married to another. One day, she tells the maidservant her son is getting married and orders her to fill a sheet with bird feathers for her son's mattress, then leaves. The maidservant manages to fetch a few feathers by nightfall, and cries for failing the task. Her mistress's son appears to her and asks her about the problem. The girl explains she cannot collect the feathers in time, and the youth offers his help in exchange for a kiss. The maiden replies that she would rather die strangled than kiss him. the youth says that his mother would expel her later that night, but takes pity on her and summons the birds with a wand for them to offer their feathers. The woman returns and suspects that her son had a hand in helping the maidservant, but this will not stop his upcoming wedding. The girl replies that her son may like her, but she does not. Later, during the wedding, the woman's son says that he wishes to have their maidservant next to him during the ceremony. The story explains that it was a custom for any person to be near the couple and hold two candles. As the ceremony goes on, the maidservant keeps holding the candles until their wax drips on her hands, burning her fingers. She complains that her fingers are burning, and the youth asks her to kiss him, but still she replies she would rather die strangled. He asks her once, twice, thrice, and nothing. Suddenly, the bride admits that she kissed a little shepherd for a bit of cheese, and the woman's son, hearing his bride's words, says the one he loves does not kiss him, yet he has done much good for her, and banishes the bride from his house. The youth then tells his mother he will marry their maidservant, whether his mother likes it or not. The youth marries the girl, and they are together. The tale was also classified as subtype A of the French Catalogue, which corresponds, in the international index, to tale type ATU 425B.

== Legacy ==
The tale was one of many from d'Aulnoy's pen to be adapted to the stage by James Planché, as part of his Fairy Extravaganza.

=== Adaptations ===
American author Josepha Sherman adapted the tale as her book Child of Faerie, Child of Earth.

==== Personet und Mathilde ====
According to the Brothers Grimm, a German language book published in 1801 contained a German tale titled Parsonet and Matilda, based on d'Aulnoy's tale. According to David Blamires, the story was titled Personet und Mathilde ("Personet and Mathilde"), wherein prince Percinet was adapted to Personet, princess Graciosa was renamed Adelheide or Adelheid, and Grognon was given the name Marcibille, which Blemires connected to the heroine of the folk book Kaiser Octavianus.

The anonymous German language Feen-Mahrchen compilation, published in 1801, compiled a German literary reworking of French tale Graciosa and Percinet. In the German tale, titled Personet und Mat[h]ilde, king Sigismund and his wife Adelheide have a daughter, but the king wishes to have a male heir to inherit the kingdom. However, queen Adelheide dies with their unborn child, leaving the king deep in grief. After ten days of grieving, his ten-year-old daughter cries over him, which shakes him off his stupor. Adelheide grows up just as beautiful and kind as her mother, and helps her father in ruling the kingdom. When she is sixteen, a neighbouring king comes to court her, but she rejects him. For this, the other king invades Sigismund's realm and promises to spare the people if they deny their former king Sigismund, but they remain loyal to their monarch and send secret messages for outside help. Other armies come to rebuff the invading army, with Sigismund chasing after the fleeing men. On the road, Sigismund feels tired and enters a forest in search of water, and reaches a castle with a pristine fountain nearby. An old man by the fountain warns the king that he and his army should flee now, otherwise drinking this water will cost him dearly. Still, the king drinks from the fountain and calls his men to join him. A dwarf servant says his mistress's name is Dame Marcibille and takes king Sigismund to a marble bath to be presentable before the fairy. The king dons a quick bath and is guided to a large ballroom to meet Marcibille: instead of a young fairy, he finds an old, decrepit lady. She tries to come on to the king, who rejects her, so she raises a staff at him and makes him fly to the window. The king quickly flees her and meets the old man, who reminds the monarch of his warning. The old man adds that the king can redeem the entire kingdom if he marries the old witch, which Sigismund agrees to do. Sigismund returns to Marcibille's chambers, asks her for forgiveness, and has sex with her under a magic mist to cloak her ugly form. Sigismund accepts her proposal, and the knights and squires of the kingdom are returned to human form. Sigismund celebrates his wedding to the ugly fairy in a dismal party, and the fairy sends for his daughter and courtiers to join him at her castle. After the wedding, king Sigismund ponders about his daughter's fate, when a youth appears to him telling him not to worry, for he is a friend. Sigismund returns to his lover's nocturnal embrace, who is a beautiful woman only at night.

Meanwhile, his daughter, princess Adelheide, rides towards Marcibille's castle ahead of a procession of their subjects. Adelheide climbs down her mount and holds her father, who introduces the girl to the fairy Marcibille as his new queen. The fairy dislikes her stepdaughter on the spot and orders her to walk towards the castle, but the princess's subjects offer to carry her in their arms. The fairy tries to climb on the princess's horse, but the equine hurries away, which prompt even more jealousy on the fairy's part. At the castle, someone voices that the princess is beautiful and the new queen is ugly, and the queen thinks that Adelheide was the one who planned this, so she demands the princess submits to her the following morning. The following morning, Adelheide asks for her stepmother's forgiveness and agrees to submit herself to whatever tasks. First, Marcibille gives her a bag full of feathers, and orders her to separate every one of them under two hours, then leaves. The princess notices that there are two feathers from every bird in the sky in the bag and cries over the impossibility of the task. Suddenly, a handsome youth appears to her: he is Prince Personet and wishes to help her. He uses his powers (since the story says he was blessed at birth with powers to help beautiful damsels in distress) and separates the feathers, then tells Adelheide she but needs to call on his help, and vanishes. A few days later, Marcibille meets Adelheide, congratulates her on the first task done and gives her another: she produces a hundred yarns for the girl to spin into a hundred tangles with no beginning nor end, and without tearing any thread. After the fairy leaves, Personet appears to Adelheide and helps her. The princess reveals that the youth is on her mind, but he vanishes as soon as the fairy returns and sees the task done. The next morning, the fairy asks Adelheid to go to her castle in the forest and fetch from there a small, but valuable box, and she trusts the princess to do it, but warns her to be aware of the box. She rides to Marcibille's castle in the forest, gets the box from the old man and rides back. On the road, she stops to rest under a tree shade and hears a voice coming from the box, asking the princess to open the box for them and promising to return to it after a while. The princess decides to open it and out comes a dancing wedding couple, playing musicians and others doing acrobacies and jumps. The princess watches their spectacle and bids them enter the box, but the more she calls for them, the more the creatures run away from her. Adelheid cries for her situation and calls for Personet, who appears in person to help her. She shows him the empty box, and the prince whistles; the creatures return immediately to the box. Personet then bids the princess farewell, saying that she will only see him again when she is dead.

She delivers the box to Marcibille, who opens up the box to see if there is anything missing, and out comes the retinue of little people; the fairy begrudgingly accepts that the princess's success and bids her accompany her to the garden to see the new waterfall. Adelheid accompanies her stepmother to the garden and she is shoved into a hole, then her servants place a stone on it. The fairy rushes to king Sigismund to lie that the princess went missing by the waterfall and they have not found her. The king blames the fairy for this incident and goes to search in the garden; they find Adelheid's body. The king mourns for his daughter and arranges for her burial with pomp. During the funeral procession to the crypt, the people wish to see their beloved princess one last time, and the king goes to open the coffin. Suddenly, the coffin lid flies open and shows an empty casket. The king questions that his fairy wife did this, but soon Personet appears with Adelheid in his arms and the king's nocturnal lover. Marcibille tries to escape, but Personet curses her to stay, for the coffin will be her room, and she will be buried in the same pit she tossed Adelheid in, doomed to sleep for millennia. It happens thus: the fairy is shoved into the coffin, which flies off to the same pit to bury her. Personet then introduces his own sister as the king's new spouse, reveals he was the old man who warned him before, and asks Sigismund if he can marry Adelheid. The princess adds that Personet was the one to help her through the whole ordeal. A double wedding is celebrated: Sigismund and Personet's sister, and Personet and princess Adelheid.

== See also ==
- Cupid and Psyche
- Fairer-than-a-Fairy (Caumont de La Force)
- Green Serpent
- Rapunzel
- Snow White
