= The Frog Queen =

Hungarian folk tale about a frog bridegroom

The Frog Queen (Hungarian: A békakirályné) is a Hungarian folk tale featuring the marriage between a human maiden and a husband in frog guise, after she makes a vow to marry the amphibian to have access to water.

The tale is related to the international cycle of the Animal as Bridegroom or The Search for the Lost Husband: a human maiden marries an animal that is a prince in disguise, breaks a taboo and loses him, and she has to seek him out. The story shares motifs with other tales of the region, like Serbian Again, The Snake Bridegroom, and Romanian Trandafiru, The Enchanted Pig and Enchanted Balaur: the heroine must search for her husband under a curse not to bear their child until he touches her again.

== Source ==
The tale was originally published by Hungarian folklorist Ősz János in the journal Erdélyi Helikon, and sourced from a Székely informant.

== Summary ==
In this tale, a man has three beautiful daughters. One day, feeling thirst, the eldest goes to a fountain to draw some water, when a frog appears and stops her, unless she agrees to marry the frog. The eldest girl despises the frog and goes back home. The middle sister tries her luck and she also denies the frog's request. The youngest sister goes to the fountain and invites the frog to come for a visit in her bedroom, then goes back home with a bucket of water. Some time later, the frog comes to their house to fulfill the girl's promise, and goes to her room. The girl places some pillows for the frog and the amphibian removes his frogskin, becoming a handsome youth clad in a vest with shining diamond buttons. She falls in love with him and they spend the nights together.

Eventually, three brothers come to court the three sisters: the elder two agree to marry the eldest brothers, while the youngest says she will only marry the frog. For this, her father banishes her to a pigsty with the frog; the girl cries, but the frog comforts her, telling her not to complain about her situation. That same night, the frog husband turns the pigsty into a diamond palace for them. They keep living as husband and wife, with him taking off the frogskin at night. However, on one occasion, the girl, unaware the frog is under a curse, decides to burn the frogskin by placing some coals under the bed. The now human frog senses a burning smell, then finds his frogskin burnt down. The tale then explains the frog is in fact the son of the king of Burkus, cursed into amphibian form by his stepfather. For her betrayal, the prince places two metal rings around his wife, curses her not to give birth until he places his two arms around her again, then turn a hundred metal sticks into a "boskor" and another hundred into a staff, then departs to the seventh kingdom.

As for the girl, she begins a journey and passes by a herd of golden pigs, which a shepherd explains belongs to the "rakkirály" ("crab-prince"), then directs her to Holy Monday. Holy Monday does not know of her husband's location, gives her a lump of golden hemp and directs her to her brother, Holy Tuesday. Holy Tuesday does not know of the crab-prince, either, but gives her a golden distaff and directs her to Saint Sreda (Holy Wednesday). The girl gains other golden objects: from Holy Wednesday, a golden spindle; from Holy Thursday a golden "motollál", from Holy Friday a golden hen with chicks, and from Holy Saturday a bushel of golden millet. Finally, the girl reaches the house of Holy Sunday, who guides her to the location of the crab-prince.

The girl, heavily pregnant, sits by the door of the castle and takes out the golden objects to draw the attention of the local queen, using the golden hemp with the golden distaff. The local Old Queen sights the newcomer, whom the tale calls "Frog Queen", and wishes to have the golden apparatuses, which the girl agrees to trade for a night in the crab-prince's chambers. She cannot wake him up, for he is fast asleep with a soporific wine. The next day, the girl draws out the spindle and the "motollál" as the next bribe, and trades them for a second night with the crab-prince. Again, she cannot wake him up. For the last night, the girl feeds the golden hen with chicks with the golden millet, and trades them for a last night in the prince's chambers. On the last night, the prince avoids drinking the wine, for a servant ("hamujutkája", in the original) informed him about the girl that came in his room, and warns he should not drink the wine. The Frog Queen enters the prince's chambers, then begs him to wake up and touch her belly, for her to be released from the metal rings. The prince wakes up and embraces his wife, releasing her from the rings and allowing her to give birth to their children, a pair of golden-haired boys with the Sun on their fronts and stars on their breasts. The prince reconciles with his wife.

== Analysis ==
=== Tale type ===
==== ATU 440: The Frog Prince ====
The first part of the tale is classified as tale type ATU 440, "The Frog Prince", or, in the Hungarian Folktale Catalogue, A BÉKAKIRÁLYFI ("The Frog Prince"). In the Hungarian type, the heroine, youngest of three daughters, gives her ring to a frog in a well; the frog comes to her house, intent on cashing in on the betrothal promise and spends the night with her; in the morning, the frog has turned into a handsome youth. However, researcher Jozséf Liszka notes that the starting episode of the three sisters or princesses going to draw water from a well does not resemble the German tale The Frog Prince, from the definitive edition of the Brothers Grimm' collection, but an earlier tale, also called The Frog Prince, that was present in the 1815 edition, but expunged from the definitive, internationally known version. It is the tale from the 1815 edition that more closely resembles oral variants of type ATU 440 collected in Hungary, Czechia, and Slovakia.

==== ATU 425A: The Animal (Monster) as Bridegroom ====
The second part of the tale is classified in the Aarne-Thompson-Uther Index as type ATU 425A, "The Animal (Monster) as Bridegroom". In this tale type, the princess burns the husband's animal skin and she must seek him out, even paying a visit to the Sun, the Moon and the Wind and gaining their help. In tale type ATU 425A, the heroine journeys far and wide to encounter her husband, and finds him at the mercy of a second spouse. The supernatural husband, now human, is put to sleep by the magic potion of the second spouse, so that the heroine has no chance of rescuing him.

Similarly, the Hungarian Folktale Catalogue (MNK) indexes it as type AaTh 425A, Ámor és Psükhé ("Amor and Psyche"): the heroine marries an animal husband that is human underneath the animal skin, burns the animal skin, and loses him; to get him back, she travels to the houses of the Mother of the Sun, the Mother of the Moon and the Mother of the Wind, and gains objects she uses to bribe the false bride for a night with her husband.

=== Motifs ===
==== The heroine's helpers ====
In a study published posthumously, Romanian folklorist Petru Caraman noted that, in Romanian and in some South Slavic variants, instead of meeting the Sun, the Moon and the Wind on the way to her husband, the heroine finds incarnations of the days of the week, like Holy Wednesday and Holy Friday. They function the same as the elements and gift the heroine with golden objects. Also, according to Hungarian scholar Ágnes Kovács, the heroine's helpers are three old ladies: the mother of the Sun, the mother of the Moon and the Mother of the Wind in Hungarian variants, and Holy Friday, Holy Saturday and Holy Sunday in Romania.

==== The heroine's gifts ====
According to Hans-Jörg Uther, the main feature of tale type ATU 425A is "bribing the false bride for three nights with the husband". In fact, when he developed his revision of Aarne-Thompson's system, Uther remarked that an "essential" trait of the tale type ATU 425A was the "wife's quest and gifts" and "nights bought". In the same vein, according to Hungarian scholar Ágnes Kovács, in Magyar Néprajzi Lexikon ("Hungarian Ethnographic Dictionary"), the heroine is cursed by her husband not to bear their children until he touches her again. In her search for him, she passes by the houses of the Mothers of the Sun, of the Moon and of the Wind (or Holy Friday, Holy Saturday and Holy Sunday), where she gains (golden) apparatuses: a distaff, a spindle, and a bobbin, which she uses to trade for a night in the prince's chambers.

==== The heroine's pregnancy ====
In Balkanic variants of the tale type, the supernatural husband curses his wife not to give birth to their child for a long period of time until she finds him again. In addition, according to Lithuanian professor Bronislava Kerbelyte, similar tales from Hungary, Romania and Moldova contain the motif of the supernatural husband wrapping iron hoops around the heroine's belly so she cannot give birth to their child until he lays a hand on her again.

In this regard, Hungarian scholar Ákos Dömötör, in the 1988 revised edition of the Hungarian Folktale Catalogue, separated this motif under a second typing indexed as AaTh 425L, Abroncs a Testen ("Rings on Body"): the husband places iron rings around the heroine's body so she is unable to give birth until he touches her again. Despite its own typing, Dömötör remarked that it is "identical" to type AaTh 425A (see above).

== Variants ==
=== King's Son, Little Miklós ===
In a Hungarian tale collected in Karcsa from a Romani teller named Kovács Aladár with the title Királyfia, Kis Miklós ("King's Son, Little Miklós"), a poor woman has a beautiful daughter of a radiant beauty. One day, she goes to draw water from a well, when suddenly a frog appears and stops her from fetching water, unless she allows him to spend a night with her, and for her to give him food and drink. Unaware of the depths of the promise, the girl agrees to offer him shelter, food and drink, and the frog allows her to fill her bucket. One night, the frog knocks on the old woman's door and asks to be let in, and girl tells her mother about the promise made to the frog at the well. The frog asks the girl to prepare him food, then to make him the bed, and asks her to place him on her lap. The girl asks her mother what to do each time, and the woman says she must keep her word. The frog and the girl go to sleep, and, at midnight, the frog turns into a handsome prince and they spend the night together. She becomes pregnant, the prince turns back into a frog and leaves. The girl then tells her mother she frog becomes human at night, and the woman advises her daughter to take the frogskin and burn it the next time he comes to their house. The frog returns another night, sings the same verses, asking his bride to take him in, and removes his amphibian skin. The girl's mother takes the skin and tosses it in the oven to burn it. The following morning, the prince tries to find the frogskin, and admonishes the girl about her mother destroying the frogskin, since he had a day remaining to end the curse, but now he must leave. He curses the girl not to bear the children she is carrying until he places his hand on her belly, and the girl, in return, curses the prince, called King's Son Little Miklós, that she will stain his shirt with drops of her blood, and only she will be able to wash it.

By cursing each other, the prince departs, and reaches another kingdom, where he marries the local princess. As for the girl, after nine months, the girl ties six hoops around her belly, and decides to go after the prince. She starts a journey and arrives at the house of an old woman, mother of Evening. Evening arrives and says he has not sees the prince, and his mother gives the girl a magic self-spinning golden skein, for her to stand in front of the palace and draw out the princess's attention to trade it for a night with the prince. Evening's mother then directs the girl to her aunt's house. The girl reaches another house in the forest that belongs to Dawn and his mother. Dawn arrives and says he has not seen the prince, and his mother gives the girl a golden hen with fifteen chicks, for her to trade for a night with her husband. Lastly, the girl arrives at the house of the mother of the Wind, who takes her in and places another hoop around her belly. After three days and nights, the Wind arrives home and his mother asks him to carry the girl to the prince's palace, then gives a cluster of golden grapes to her for her to trade for a night with the prince. The Wind takes the girl to the palace's doors, and she finds a group of twelve washerwomen trying to wash the bloodstains from the prince's shirt. The girl offers to wash the stain and does it, and the washerwomen take her in.

Sometime later, the girl takes out the golden spindle and skein and draws the attention of the local princess, who sends her maid to buy it. The girl trades it for a night in the prince's chamber, but the princess gives him sleeping bread and wine to make him asleep. The girl tries to wake him up and begs him to touch her for her to bear their twins who will have the sun and the moon on their fronts. In the morning, the prince goes on a hunt, while the girl trades the golden hen with chicks for a second night, but he is put to sleep again and she fails. On the third day, a coachman informs the prince of the girl that comes to his room at night and cries over him. The prince then decides to avoid eating the bread and drinking the wine. The girl trades the golden grapes with the princess for one last night, and the princess agrees, but plots to drug the prince with the remaining bread and wine. The girl goes to her room and cries over him, and prince Little Miklós wakes up and touches his true bride, allowing her to bear their one-year-old children with the sun and the moon on the front. The prince then summons the noblemen to ask them that he had a golden box with a golden key, lost it and had a silver key made, but found the golden key, and the noblemen answer he should keep the golden key. He then shows his true wife and children to the crowd, asking them what shall be done to one that tried to hide such beautiful souls. The local princess says they should be shot and their remains tied to horses. The prince admits the princess has uttered her own sentence, for she tried to drug him and keep him away from his wife and unborn children. The princess is punished and King's Son Little Miklós lives with his true wife and children. The tale was classified as type AaTh 425, and, according to the collectors, the teller combined the tale with type AaTh 440 (the prince in frog skin) as its introduction.

=== The Frog in the Well ===
In a Hungarian tale collected in the Ukrainian Carpathians with the title A béka a kútban ("The Frog in the Well"), a couple have three daughters, Mariska, Erzsike and Juliská. One day, their mother sends the elder to fetch water from the only well in the village that has not dried up due to a severe draught. However, Mariska returns empty-handed, so the woman sends the middle daughter to draw water for their dinner. The second girl also fails. Finally, the woman sends the youngest, Juliská, to the well. The tale explains that a frog was by the well and offered them water in exchange for the girls becoming his wife, but, since they, refused, they returned with no water. Juliská goes to the well and meets the frog, agreeing to become his wife in exchange for the water, and returns home with the water. Later, during dinner, the frog knocks on the door and sings some verses to remind the youngest daughter about her promise. The man opens the door to the frog and lets him in. Later, they allow him to spend the night with his intended and prepare the bed for the couple. At night, the frog removes his frogskin to become a handsome prince and sleeps next to Juliská. The girl's fathers take a lamp to see the couple in bed and find the discarded frogskin and a handsome youth in their daughter's bed. The mother tells her husband to take the frogskin and burn it in the oven. It happens thus. The next morning, the prince wakes up and despairs at not finding the frogskin. His mother-in-law admits she burned the animal skin to keep him with them. The tale then explains the prince had a stepmother who wanted to marry him to her daughter, but, since he refused, she cursed him into amphibian form. The prince says he has to leave, but Juliská then gives him a shirt as wedding gift and drops some blood on it so that she is the only one that can wash it, and in return the prince says that Juliská is pregnant with two golden-haired children who she will not be able to bear until he places a hand on her belly, then departs. Time passes, and Juliská goes after him, carrying with her a golden spindle, a golden bobbin and a golden rod, eventually reaching the castle where the prince lives. She takes out the golden instruments and stands next to the castle doors to draw the attention of the queen, the prince's stepmother. Juliská bribes the queen for three nights in the prince's room. On the first two nights, the queen dowses the prince's wine with a sleeping powder, and cannot wake him up. Meanwhile, the washerwomen at the castle try to wash the bloodstains on the prince's shirt, and Juliská offers to wash it. She washes her husband's shirt, and the washerwomen inform the queen about it, who allows Juliská to spend the night in the prince's chamber. That same night, the prince's servant boy, a boy of twelve, is beaten by the queen and expelled, so the prince goes after him. The servant boy explains that the queen beat him off, and says that he hears a woman crying over the prince's sleeping body, asking him to touch her. The prince learns of the event and, during dinner, avoids drinking the altered drink, then pretends to be asleep as Juliská enters his room to beg him to allow their children to be born. The prince wakes up and touches Juliská, who bears their golden-haired twins. The prince sends for clothes for his children and white garments fitting for a queen. The queen, his stepmother, enters the room and sees the children lying in bed. The prince asks his stepmother what should be done to a person to tries to separate a father from his two children. The queen answers that they should be tied to two horses who are to be let out in the city. The prince then seizes the queen and her daughter, beheads them, and ties their bodies to two horses that are unleashed in the city. Juliská then lives with the prince and their two children.

=== The Cursed Maiden ===
In a tale collected from teller Matild Horváth with the title Az elátkozott leány ("The Cursed Maiden"), a girl goes to fetch water for her father and goes to a well, but she is stopped by an ugly frog that demands to sleep on her bed in exchange for allowing access to the water. She goes back home with the water and lets the frog sleep on her bed, but, to her surprise, the frog takes off its skin to become a handsome youth. The next evening, while they go to sleep, the neighbours take the frogskin and burn it. The morning after, as soon as the human frog wakes up and does not see the amphibian skin, he curses the girl not to give birth to any child for seven years, until he places three fingers on her and a golden circle around her. He also tells her to find him where the herbs sing and dance, then vanishes. After seven years of a long journey, she finds God, who gives her a golden key and a golden locket. The girl then arrives at the well of her husband, which the story names Király Dávid ("King David"), and asks for a bit of water, since she has not drunk anything in seven years. She then gives the cook the golden objects to allow access to her husband, King Dávid, so he can touch her. The cook, however, receives the golden objects, but gives a plate with sleeping potion to King Dávid and he is asleep when the girl tries to wake him up. On the third time, King Dávid does not eat the food the cook prepared and touches his wife's belly, so she can give birth to their child. The cook is then punished.

=== Frog King (Csóngrad) ===
In a Hungarian tale collected from a teller named Palásti Annuska in Csongrád with the title Békakirály ("Frog King"), a king has three daughters, the youngest the most beautiful. He also has a beautiful garden. Still, the youngest princess remains sad, and cannot seem to know why, not even her elder sisters. One day, she takes her ladies-in-waiting for a walk and reaches a desert. Suddenly, a large, ugly frog hops into view and blocks her path. The princess cannot shake her disgust at his presence, and her ladies-in-waiting shake in fear. The princess then kicks him thrice, and the frog warns her that he is an enchanted prince and will come to her at night. The princess returns home and tells the king about the strange frog and his words. Later that same day, at night, the frogs knocks on the king's door and asks the princess to be let in. The princess opens the door to the frog with some reluctance and lets him stay by her bed. In the middle of the night, the princess wakes up and finds a handsome prince next to her. The prince asks the princess to prepare a pan with hot coals for the following night, into which she is to kick the frogskin to burn it. The princess agrees to do it. The following morning, the prince dons the frogskin again, and the princess talks to her father about the prince's request. On the second night, the frog prince spends the night with the princess, and she kicks the frogskin towards the pan with the coals to burn it. The following morning, the now human prince thanks the princess for destroying the amphibian skin that he was trapped under for the past seven years, but now he must return to his homeland, and bids her to follow him, then departs. The princess tells her father she will go after him, and the king gives her his blessings for her journey. She travels afar, beyond the Óperencias sea, and the crops of hay and millet, until she finds an old woman in an old hut. The old woman takes the princess in and gives her three eggs, for her to crack open in case of extreme need. The princess then continues her journey and tries to climb a steep mountain, so she cracks open the first egg and finds a set of needles she glues to her feet. Next, the princess cracks open the second egg and releases a fiáker pulled by four doves. She walks a bit more and reaches a large palace, where she deduces the prince is. The princess dons a disguise and follows him to church, then takes out the fiáker with the doves in front of the church and breaks open the final egg, releasing a set of mice, two playing music and two dancing, and cracks another egg, which releases a carriage driven by little mice. The maidservant and the cook are drawn to the fiáker drawn by doves and wishes to have it, but the princess trades for a night next to the prince's room, in the echo chamber. The prince, however, is given the honey of dreams and falls asleep, while the princess enters his room and tries to wake him up. Failing that, she trades the mice-drive carriage for a second night: she enters the room and tries to wake him up, to no avail. The prince is informed by a servant about the maiden that enters the room and cries for him at night, and the prince says he will pay attention to it. Lastly, the princess trades the mice quartet, two mice musicians and two dancing mice, with the cook for the last night. She cries for him next to his door, he wakes up and opens his door, reuniting with his bride. They celebrate their reunion, and return to the princess's father's kingdom, who organizes a large feast in celebration of his three daughters being married.

== See also ==
- The Serpent Prince
- The Enchanted Prince Who was a Hedgehog
- The Calf's Skin
