= About the astonishing husband Hora =

Ukrainian fairy tale

"About the astonishing husband Hora" (Ukrainian: «Про дивовижного чоловіка Гору») is a Ukrainian fairy tale collected by folklorist Petro Lintur from a Transcarpathian Ukrainian source. It deals with the marriage between a human maiden and a man in a serpent's guise.

The tale is related to the international cycle of the Animal as Bridegroom or The Search for the Lost Husband: a human maiden marries an animal that is a prince in disguise, breaks a taboo and loses him, and she has to seek him out. A specific motif of the tale, which also appears in variants from the Balkans and Romania, is the heroine searching for her husband under a curse not to bear their child until he touches her again.

== Sources ==
According to Petro Lintur, the tale was collected from an informant named Dilinko Ivan Gavrilovich.

== Summary ==
A man has an estate and lends money to the tsar. One day, he tells his wife he will search for a son for themselves, so he can inherit the estate. The man wanders off a bit and finds a small snake on the ground which he bags and brings home. He drops the snake inside a small cup filled with milk. The snake keeps growing and he moves him to a large tub full of milk, and finally to a large barn.

One day, the snake son whistles and his father goes to check on him: the snake wishes to marry the tsar's daughter. The man goes to talk to the tsar and says his son is so tall he lives in a barn. The tsar takes the queen and the princess and accompanies the man back to the barn: the monarch finds the large snake, but decides to go through with the wedding between the princess and the animal. The princess dances with the snake at the wedding, and tells the snake to devour her, but the snake bridegroom says she is his wife. The snake takes her with him to the end of the world, and the princess tells the snake to devour her, but again the snake tells her she is his wife, then gives her a ball to throw upwards. The princess does as instructed: the ball is tossed upwards then falls to the ground, turning into a large palace.

The snake then says the princess is to stay home while he goes fishing. As soon as he leaves, he takes off the snakeskin and becomes a silver-haired youth. He meets the princess, named Mariyka, and tries to come on to her, placing his hand on her, but she denies him, saying she is already married to Hora. The snake husband tests her fidelity again, the second time by removing his snakeskin and turning into a golden-haired youth. He appears as a stranger to her and again tries to seduce her, but she remains loyal to the snake husband and denies the stranger's advances. Lastly, he tests her a third time by becoming a diamond-haired youth. Once again, Mariyka denies the stranger's advances. The farce ending, he admits he is her husband. Mariyka does not believe it at first, until he enters the snakeskin and becomes the youths that appeared to her. He also tells her he knows she wishes to visit her parents, so he gives her a magic chair and a straw that can carry her back to her parents, but advises her not to listen to her mother, only to her father.

Mariyka sits on the chair and says to the straw to carry her back to her parents' palace. She tells them everything, and her mother advises her to heat up the oven and burn the snakeskin, but the king warns her not to do it, and let his curse end in its own time. Still, Mariyka returns to her husband's palace and, while he goes out to fish, she tosses the snakeskin in the fire. The snake husband smells the burning and returns to the palace. He admonishes his wife for listening to her mother's words, and curses his wife not to give birth to the twin boys she is carrying in her womb, until he touches two fingers on her, for she will have three iron hoops around her body. He then vanishes, taking the castle with him and abandoning her in the meadow.

The princess then begins a journey in search of her husband: she passes by the houses of the Sun and his mother (where she gets a silver hen with chicks), the Stars and their mother (where she gains a self-moving sliver), and the Moon and his mother (where she gains a pair of golden ducks). The Moon knows the location of Mariyka's husband, for he has been there, and gives her directions. Mariyka reaches her husband's new location, where he has taken another wife, a wicked queen. Mariyka stays by the steps of the castle spinning the sliver and interacting with the hen, the chicks and the birds. The queen's maidservants tell the queen, and she wishes to buy the object. Mariyka offers the golden sliver for a night in Hora's chambers. The queen gives Hora's some wine so he falls asleep. Mariyka tries to wake him and begs for him to touch her, but he does not nudge.

The next morning, a servant named Popela, who has eyes in front and in the back of his head and lies on the castle stove, alerts Hora he saw something at night, but will only reveals if he is given a porridge with flour and some mare's milk. Popela then warns him not to drink anything the queen may give him, and only pretend to fall asleep. On the second night, Mariyka trades the hen and chicks and the golden ducks for a night in Hora's room. She begs him to touch her, he wakes up and touches her body, thus allowing her to give birth to their sons, a pair of golden twins. Hora then orders the queen to be drawn and quartered by horses, and he lives with Mariyka and their sons.

== Analysis ==
=== Tale type ===
The tale is classified in the East Slavic Folktale Classification (Russian: СУС, romanized: SUS) as type SUS 433B, Russian: Царевич-рак, romanized: Tsarevich-rak, lit. 'Prince Crawfish': a woman gives birth to a crawfish who marries the princess; the princess burns his animal skin and has to seek him out; she trades expensive items to spend a night with her husband and he recognizes her. The East Slavic Index, last updated in 1979 by folklorist Lev Barag, registers variants of type SUS 433B only in Ukraine. In the same vein, in a 1958 study, professor Nikolay Andreyev noted that the tale type 433B, "The Crab Prince", featured among types that were rare or inexistent in the Russian repertoire.

However, in the international Aarne-Thompson-Uther Index, the tale corresponds to type ATU 425A, "The Animal (Monster) as Bridegroom": the princess burns the husband's animal skin and she must seek him out, even paying a visit to the Sun, the Moon and the Wind and gaining their help. The heroine is given marvellous objects on the way to her husband by the personifications of the elements, or by her helpers, and she uses them to bribe the false bride for a night with him. Only on the third night the heroine manages to talk to her husband and he recognizes her.

=== Motifs ===
Marriage to a snake is classified by Motif-Index of Folk-Literature as motif B656. Marriage to reptile in human form.

In Balkanic variants of the tale type, the supernatural husband curses his wife not to give birth to their child for a long period of time until she finds him again.

==== The snake husband ====
Similarly, in his work about animal symbolism in Slavic culture, Russian philologist Aleksandr V. Gura noted that the snake husband marries the heroine in East Slavic type SUS 433B, although the enchanted husband can appear as another type of animal, such as crawfish, frogs, toads, serpents and worms. Also, the snake itself is imbued with male symbolism, and is connected to phallic symbolism.

==== The heroine's journey ====
According to Hans-Jörg Uther, the main feature of tale type ATU 425A is "bribing the false bride for three nights with the husband". In fact, when he developed his revision of Aarne-Thompson's system, Uther remarked that an "essential" trait of the tale type ATU 425A was the "wife's quest and gifts" and "nights bought".

In the same vein, in Ukrainian tales of type SUS 433B, the heroine marries a water or aquatic animal, burns his animal skin, causing their separation, and goes in search of him, meeting helpers on the way who give her wondrous objects she uses to bribe her husband's second bride. The heroine's helpers, in the Ukrainian texts, may be the Sun, the Moon, the Wind, the Stars and their respective mothers. These women are the ones to act as mediators between the heroine and the elements.

== Variants ==
=== By Petro Lintur ===
In a Ukrainian tale collected by folklorist Petro Lintur from Khust with the title "Жених-уж и невеста-лягушка" (Ukrainian: «Жених-вуж і наречена-жаба», lit. 'The Bridegroom-Snake and the Bride-Frog'), a boy begins to behave badly, and his widow mother curses him to become a reptile. He turns into a snake and creeps away to the mountains. Meanwhile, a local king becomes blind, and his only cure is water from a certain fountain. Each of this daughters goes to the fountain to fetch some water in a jug, but a mysterious voice scares the elder two away, while the youngest princess daringly takes some water. The voice tells her she will become the voice's bride, and the princess retorts: "So be it". The third princess brings the water to cure her father, and tells him about the voice. The king advises her to fulfill her promise. Thus, the princess wears a black dress and waits in her room for whoever was at the fountain. A snake slithers into her room, and asks her to turn off the light. She does; the snake takes off the snakeskin to become a golden-haired youth whose hair illuminates the whole room. The youth then asks the princess not to reveal the secret. The next morning, the princess's sisters mock her for having a mysterious husband, and she answers she has a handsome human husband. Later that day, the princess's sisters take the snakeskin and burn it in an oven. When the youth awakes, he cannot find the snakeskin, so he curses his wife not to give birth to any child until he places two fingers on her, then departs to a kingdom beyond the Black Sea. A year, a year and a half passes; the princess, heavily pregnant, wraps iron circles around her belly and begins a long quest. She passes by the hut of the First Wind and its father (who give her a golden hen with golden chicks), the Second Wind and its mother-in-law (who give her a golden yarn and a golden spindle), and the Third Wind and its father. The Third Wind returns from a journey around the world and tells the princess he saw her husband's second wife trying to wash a bloodied shirt in the kingdom beyond the Black Sea, and gives her a ball, advising her to reach the kingdom and trade the items with the woman. Following its orders, the princess reaches the kingdom beyond the Black Sea, and washes the bloodied shirt for her. The princess then trades the golden objects for three nights with her husband; for the first two nights, he lies asleep due to a sleeping draught, but she manages to wake him up on the third night. He wakes up and places his fingers on her; she gives birth to twin boys, one golden-haired, like the father, and another without golden hair. The tale then continues with the adventures of the golden-haired twin, who grows up and marries a frog that turns into a human princess.

=== By Mykola Levchenko ===
In a Ukrainian tale from Podolia published by Ukrainian literary critic Mykola Levchenko with the title Ukrainian: «Як зачарований королевич-вуж засватав царівну», lit. 'How the enchanted Prince-Snake wooed the Princess', an old woodcutter lives with his wife in the woods. One day, he goes out to gather firewood and brings home a snake. The man and his wife decide to adopt it as their son. Years later, the snake begins to talk and asks them to woo the princess for him as his bride. Despite the old couple's worries that no human woman will wish to marry a snake, they agree to it, and the old man goes to the king to propose on his son's behalf. The king agrees to the proposal, but sets a test for the snake: he should jump to the third store window and grab the princess's signet ring. The old man explains the test to the snake and he accomplishes the feat. The old man returns the ring to the king, who tosses it in the sea and orders the snake to find it. The snake also fulfills the task. The snake is brought on a plate to the princess, who cannot stop crying. Time passes, and the king invites his daughter and her husband to a feast at the palace. The princess cries over the possibility of taking a snake to a feast, but the snake takes off the snakeskin to become a human youth, locks it in a chest, and takes the princess to the castle. While her husband is dining with her father, she runs back home, opens up the chest, takes the snakeskin and burns it. The snake husband, in human form, follows his wife home and, seeing the burnt snakeskin, hits her on the nose, some drops of blood falling on his shirt. He proclaims they are no longer husband and wife, and vanishes. Later, the princess begins to search for him and meets three women on the road: one spinning threads of golden flax, another working on a golden reel, and the third taking a golden hen and its golden chicks to graze. The princess buys the golden objects from each of them by 100 coins each, and continues her journey until she reaches a river where some launderesses are trying to wash a bloodied shirt. The princess offers to wash it and cleans the droplets of blood. She then asks for a job as a goose-herder in the nearby castle. Some time later, she princess takes out the golden objects and bribes the mistress of the castle, the snake husband's new wife, to spend a night with the now human snake husband. The mistress of the castle agrees and lets her in, but she gives a sleeping potion to the man for the first two nights. On the third night, the princess pricks his skin with a needle and he wakes up. They reconcile, and the snake husband sends the mistress of the castle away.

=== By Mykhailo Ivasyuk ===
In a Ukrainian tale collected by Ukrainian folklorist Mykhailo Ivasyuk with the title Ukrainian: «Чоловік-невидимка», romanized: cholovik-nevydymka, lit. 'Invisible Husband', a peasant man goes to the woods to fetch wood, but loses the trail and wanders off, so he stops to rest. In his sleep, he has a dream where a voice says the man's wife will give birth to a girl, and when she is seventeen years old, a golden-maned horse in a diamond saddle will come to take the girl to the voice as its bride. The man wakes up and returns home, and indeed a girl was born to his wife. The girl, named Maryka, grows up in the village until she is seventeen, when the horse in the diamond saddle appears, to fetch her to its master, just as the voice predicted. Maryka mounts on the horse and flies away to a beautiful palace beyond the mountains. She spends her days alone, but someone comes at night to her. They live like this for months, until one day she says she wishes to visit her family. The voice allows it, but warns her not to bring anything with her on the way back, since the horse will sense she is heavy and drop her off. Maryka visits her mother and grandmother and tells them about the unseen person at night, and they give her candles and matches. Maryka returns to the palace, despite the horse sensing her heaviness, and she goes to sleep with the voice. At night, on her bed, she lights the candles and sees a handsome youth beside her. The youth wakes up with a startle and admonishes her, saying Maryka will only find him again after she wears down an iron staff, iron shoes and an iron hoop around her belly. Suddenly, the girl finds herself outside the palace, and begins her long journey to find him again. During her quest, she meets in the middle of a wide field Pyanitsa (Friday), who gives her a golden spinning wheel; then in a yellow desert Saturday, who gives her a golden self-moving loom, and lastly Sunday in the middle of a forest, who gives her a golden hen with chicks. Sunday also advises Maryka to follow the hen wherever it leads. Maryka follows Sunday's advice: the hen leads her to a willow tree. Maryka climbs the willow tree with the golden objects, the willow tree bends down to the other side of a river, and she finds herself in front of her husband's palace. Another woman was already there, and sees Maryka with the golden hen and its chicks, then says she wants it. Maryka trades her for a night with her husband, but the other woman places a "dead cloth" on him so he does not wake up. The next night, Maryka trades the golden spinning wheel, but her husband is also asleep. On the third and final night, she trades the self-moving loom, and a servant of her husband takes off the dead cloth from his body, which allows him to wake up and recognize Maryka. The other woman disappears, and Maryka gives birth to a son.

=== By Volodymyr Hnatiuk ===
In a Ukrainian tale collected by ethnographer Volodymyr Hnatiuk from teller Mitra Palanchani with the title Ukrainian: «Чоловік-вуж», lit. 'The Snake-Man', a husband and wife live together and pray to God to have a son. One day, when the woman is sweeping the house, a little reptile ("га́дзік", in the original) appears in the room and the woman tries to shoo it away, but the reptile calls her mother and asks to be welcomed. The reptile son grows up and wants to play with the other children, but they flee from him. He also goes to school and studies for three years. Later, he asks for a wife, and sets his sights on the tsar's daughter. He rides a rooster towards the tsar's palace and makes his proposal; the tsar asks his three daughters which one agrees to marry the reptile, and the youngest accepts. The youngest princess marries the reptile and, on the wedding night, discovers he becomes a handsome golden-haired youth when he removes the reptilian skin. He warns her to keep it a secret. Some time later, she visits her parents and tells them how her husband is handsome, and her mother advises her to burn the animal skin that night. That same night, the princess takes the skin and tries to toss it into a burning oven. However, her husband, in human form, stops her and curses her not to give birth to their child unless he places his hand on her belly. He takes his skin and departs to another land, where he takes shelter with another woman. Back to the princess, she cries for her lost husband, then asks the people where she can find a blacksmith from whom she can commission an iron hoop for her belly, since her unborn son is growing inside her belly and cannot be delivered yet. She keeps journeying for another year until she finds another blacksmith, where she commissions another iron hoop for her belly, and asks if he saw a golden-haired man (her husband). Still not finding him, she passes by a third blacksmith and asks for another hoop. The third blacksmith also tells her there is such a man that fits her description in a place just beyond the sea. The princess takes a boat and oars to the other margin, then reaches a village where she buys a bunch of golden sliver, a golden spindle, and a golden swift. The princess sits on a bench with the golden apparatuses, and draws the attention of her husband's second wife, with whom he has been living in the village, and trades the golden objects for one night in his chambers, each object for each night. The first two nights, the princess tries to talk to him and begs him to touch her belly so she can give birth at last to their child, but he remains fast asleep for he drank an intoxicating drink. After the princess is brought out of his chambers, a servant tells the golden-haired man about the woman that has cried on him for the past two nights. He recognizes it is his first wife who has been trying to talk to him, but his traitorous second wife gave him a drink to hinder her attempts. The third night, the golden-haired man avoids drinking wine and pretends to be asleep, so that his first wife comes to his room to talk to him, after she has traded the swift for the last night. The princess cries all night for her husband, until he wakes up and places his hand on her belly, allowing the iron hoops to fall from her body and their child to be born: a pair of twin boys. An angel appears to them and gives each of them a golden apple. The second wife removes the princess and her children from the bedroom and shuts them out of the house and into the stables, where two hungry wild boars will devour them. The golden-haired man asks the woman where are his family, and she says they are outside. He brings them back, dresses his sons, then beheads the second wife, remaining with his first wife and sons. They all take the boat and return to his father's house, where they live for twenty years. The tale then continues with the family's adventures. Folklorist Petro Lintur translated the tale to German as Der Nattermensch ("The Adder Man"), and indexed it as type ATU 425A and partially type 433.

=== By Michal Hirjak ===
In a Ukrainian (Rusyn) tale collected by folklore researcher Michal Hirjak from an Eastern Slovak source (Petro Il'ko from the Carpatho-Rusyn village of Bodružal) with the title Ukrainian: «Проклятий син», romanized: Prokliatyi syn, lit. 'The Cursed Son', a man marries a woman. Years into their marriage (one, two, five, even ten years), the man complains to his wife he wants a son, and berates her. One time, when she goes outside their house, she sees the children playing and prays to the Virgin Mary for a child of her own, even if it is a serpent ("gad"). Thus, she becomes pregnant and gives birth to a snake. She nurses the animal for three years. After he grows up, the snake asks his father to court one of the local tsar's three daughters, first the elder princess. The man goes to talk to the tsar, says his son, a snake, was born to his wife, and the tsar agrees to their marriage: he will keep them in the same room, and, if the snake does not devour the princess, they shall be considered married. The man goes back home and tells his son about it, then takes him to the tsar's castle. The reptile and the elder princess spend the night together: he lies his tail on her body, but she slaps it away. He then devours the elder princess. Some time later, he asks the middle princess for wife. Again, the tsar agrees to have them married, but fears that he will devour this one next, just as he did to the previous one. The reptile spends the night with the middle princess, touches her body with his tail, but she screams. He then devours the second princess. Lastly, he asks his father to bring the youngest princess as his wife. The reptile lies on her body and she holds his paws and caresses him. The third princess survives and marries the reptile. However, the reptile removes his reptilian skin at night and goes to sleep as human, then returns to his animal disguise, due to his mother's curse. The princess pays a visit to her parents and tells her mother about how handsome her husband is underneath the reptilian skin. The queen suggests they destroy the reptilian skin, so she will heat up the oven, while the princess goes to fetch her husband's skin. It happens thus and the princess's husband tries to recover the burning skin, but they hold him back. He feels his body burning, and the monarchs call for the doctors. After he recovers, he commissions a large iron hoop to be made, and places it around the princess's body. He tells her she will have their children, but she will not be able to bear him until he places his hands on her belly, she wears out some boots, holds a stump on her hand and bread falls from a bowl. He expels her from home and she wanders the world, the iron hoop hanging heavily on her body. After five years, she reaches a city where a good fortune-teller takes her in. The fortune-teller divines that her husband is there, and the princess will want to talk to him for one night, but he will be sleeping. She also gives the princess some silver thread, for her to trade for one night with her husband. The princess goes to the market and the passers-by sight the silver thread. The local queen also sees the newcomer and wishes to buy the thread, but the princess makes a deal: the thread for one night in the youth's quarters. A deal is made, and the princess tries to talk to her husband, narrating her arduous journey and begging him to touch her so she can give birth to their son. She fails on the first night, then returns to the fortune-teller, who gives her a golden thread, advising her to barter with the queen again. It happens thus, but the princess still cannot wake up her husband, for he is fast asleep. The third time, the fortune-teller tells her she foresaw this, and gives the princess a beautiful thread of diamond. The princess trades the last thread and enters her husband's quarters, again begging him to touch the iron hoops. He opens his eyes and extends his arms to touch her, releasing her from the hoop. He wakes up afraid, but sees that his wife, the princess, is there with him. His mother and the king also come to see him, and they live together.

In a Ukrainian tale collected from a Ukrainian source in Slovakia with the title Гадиґашпар ("Gadigashpar") or Гадогашпар ("Gadogashpar"), a king and a queen suffer for not having children. They pray to God for one and a girl is born to them. Even when having a daughter, they think of marrying her off when she is of marriageable age (fifteen or sixteen) so that their name and lineage can continue. When she is a bit older (eighteen or nineteen), the princess herself disagrees to their terms, since she does not want to be given away in marriage and to have children, despite her mother's insistence that children are motif of joy. Still, the princess finds a prince to marry, and makes a silent wish not to have children. As she sees that people having children is a reason for their joy, she relents on her decision and wants to have one. One day, she goes to the garden for a walk and sees a coiled snake, then utters a wish that she could have a son like a snake, and it happens thus: she gives birth to a son wearing a snakeskin. The old queen chastises her own daughter for her own decision, and worries that they will not be able to find a potential suitor for a snake. When the snake son is twenty years old, he overhears his family commenting that he will never be able to marry, and announces he will leave home to find a wife for himself. He departs and meets an old man on the road, whom he greets. The snake son tells the man he is going to a spring to find a wife for himself, and the old man directs him to a place beyond seven mountains and seven valleys, in a meadow where people come to wash their clothes, and talk to any girl that comes there. The snake son does as instructed and waits by a spring, where he meets a girl washing clothes. The snake and the girl strike a conversation, and she decides to marry him. The snake prince takes the girl back to the royal castle and introduces her as his wife. The family move them to a nearby hut, and people mock her for marrying a snake husband. She mentions it to her husband, but he asks her to let it go. At night, the snake son hides his snakeskin under the bed and becomes a handsome prince. The old queen suspects something and confronts the poor girl when she becomes pregnant, wanting to banish her from the palace. The girl reveals that the snake son hides his animal skin at night to become human. The queen steals the snakeskin and orders it to be burned in an oven. The skin crackles in the fire so much that the prince wakes up and goes to the kitchen. He finds it destroyed, and asks his wife about it, then curses her not to bear the child she is carrying until he places his right hand on her body, and bids her find him in iron clothes. He departs. The pregnant girl takes a compass from the castle and goes after him. After seven years asking around for the location of her husband Gadogashpar/Gadigashpar, she reaches the hut of the Moon ("Мішячок") and his mother, who do not know his location, direct him to the Sun ("Сонечко"), and the Moon's mother gives her a golden spindle. At the house of the Sun, neither he nor his mother know of the missing prince, his mother gives her a sliver of iron, and directs her to the house of the Wind, since he blows everywhere. At the house of the Wind, he says Gadogashpar is being kept prisoner in a cellar, under the power of Ezhibaba. The Wind promises to take the girl there, and his mother gives her a golden bobbin. After she is carried by the Wind to Ezhibaba's house, the girl draws out the marvellous objects to attract the witch's attention. The witch is not at home, but her cook is, with whom Gadogashpar's wife trades the objects for a night with him. The witch's cook takes the girl to the barn and she tries to wake him up, begging him three times to touch her. She fails on the first two occasions. On the third occasion, she cries out for him, and his body starts to stir, when nine reptiles appear on him and move in to attack her. She cries for her husband one final time, and he wakes up. The cook tells the couple she has been redeemed, and even if her boss Ezhibaba comes back the witch cannot do anything to her. Gadogashpar's wife gives birth to their son in the hut, and they return to his family's castle, taking the cook and the objects the girl gained back with them. His family is now old, and they celebrate a new wedding with much food. The tale was collected in 1972, from a source named Mykola Dutka, in the village of Tsygelka, Bardejov District, and classified as type 425.

=== By Ivan Reboshapka ===
In a Ukrainian tale titled "Сокіл-Михайло" ("Sokil-Mykhailo", Falcon-Mykhailo (Note: "Falcon" is a common Slavic epithet for a handsome and brave man)), collected by folklorist Ivan Reboshapka from informant Nikolay Doda, in Visovel, Maramures, a poor couple have a handsome and strong son near whom maidens swoon. Despite his beauty, his father sends him to find some gold near the fountain. The youth consults with a fortune-teller who instructs him how to approach the fountain: say seven Our Fathers, cross two rivers naked and crawl towards the fountain, but not drink any water. The youth does as instructed and reaches the gold fountains. Suddenly, a large snake with a white stone on its mouth appears and tells the youth he is now the guardian of the three cauldrons of gold, and gives him the white stone. After a while, Sokil Mykhailo returns home and his mother is frightened at his appearance: a large snake. Sokil-Mykhailo, in snake form, tells his parents he found them gold, but he must live as a snake for seven years, being able to become human at night. He also has the white stone on his mouth, which allows him to survive with no food, nor water for the whole of the enchantment. Sokil-Mykhailo brings the cauldrons of gold to his family and sends his mother to court the princess. The old woman, whom the tale explains has "no machine, no motorbike, no luxuries", meets the king. On seeing the poor woman, he demands the would be suitor appears at once the following morning. The following day, Sokil-Mykhailo, being a large snake, appears at the castle, but is mistaken by the king's soldiers as an enemy creature and is welcomed with cannonballs. Despite the misunderstanding, the snake youth tells the king he wishes to marry the princess, who is to wear a white dress. The snake and the princess marry in a large dome and they enter the wedding chambers. Sokil-Mykhailo alternates between being a snake by day and human by night, to the princess's delight, who tells her father about it. The king and his ministers spy on his transformation and decide to burn the snakeskin by having a maidservant prepare an oven. It happens thus, but the tale explains Sokil-Mykhailo had four years for the enchantment. He wakes up, admonishes his wife and ties two metal rings around the princess's belly, cursing her not to give birth to their child until he places a hand on her again, then departs. Sokil-Mykhailo then enters a tavern and meets the snake who sent him the serpentine disguise, who takes him in to live with his three daughters. Sokil-Mykhailo chooses the snake's youngest daughter as his new companion and is forced to perform tasks for him: first, to raze a mountain and plant apple trees overnight; second, to raze a mountain, plant wheat, harvest it and grind the grain into flour; and lastly to build a bridge between two mountain peaks, plant a vineyard and build a restaurant on the bridge. With the snake's daughter's magic help, Sokil-Mykhailo fulfills the tasks to the snake-man's approval, who lets Sokil-Mykhailo live with his three daughters. Back to the pregnant princess, she begins a journey and passes by the houses of the Golden Sun, the Moon and the Morning Star. The Sun and the Moon do not know of the princess's husband, save for the Morning Star, who says Sokil-Mykhailo is living with the snakes and gives her three threads, one of gold, one of silver and one of diamond, for her to barter for a chance to see her husband. The princess does as instructed and requests shelter at the snake's house, which is denied, but is given access to the shop. The princess trades the diamond thread for the chance to sleep near Sokil-Mykhailo's bed and cries over his body, half-covered with a magic "dead cloth". The princess nudges her husband awake, he turns to touch her and she gives birth to their son. Sokyl-Mikhailo decides to escape from the snakes' den with his family, and they shapeshift into birds to fly away over the sea to the princess's kingdom, where they celebrate their return.

=== Other tales ===
In a Transcarpathian Ukrainian tale titled Ukrainian: «Заклітий Василь і царівна Юліна», lit. 'Cursed Vasil and princess Yulina', an old woman is washing her clothes in the river when a snake crawls towards her. She feels frightened at first, but the snake assuages her fears and asks her to adopt him. She takes the snake with him and they live like mother and son. Ten years later, the snake asks his mother to go to the king and ask for the princess's hand in marriage. The old woman goes to the king, who accepts the marriage proposal, but in turn she snake has to build a diamond bridge connecting the castle to the old woman's hut, pine trees alongside the road and a nest on each tree, so that the king is awakened by the cuckoo's cry. The old woman reports back to the snake, who fulfills the task overnight. The next morning, the king, seeing that the snake fulfilled his order and it is crawling on the road to his castle, tells his daughter, princess Yulina, to go with the animal. The snake guides Yulina through valleys and mountains until they reach an open field. Yulina lies down on the grass and, when she wakes up, she finds herself in a large court. She lives in this court with the snake inside a barrel, until one evening, a golden-haired youth appears to her. The youth explains he is Vasil, who was cursed by his mother to be a snake for the past ten years, and now, the time of the curse is almost over, and shows her the snakeskin. Some time later, Yulina tells Vasil she wants to visit her family; the snake gives her a magical chair that can transport her back, and advises her not to listen to her mother. Yulina goes back home; she tells her mother, the queen, about Vasil and his snakeskin, and she advises her to take it and burn it, but the king warns her against it. At any rate, Yulina returns to the snake's court and burns the snakeskin. Vasil sees her deed and can only lament, and tells her she will have to hurt her feet if she wants to look for him. The next morning, Vasil and the court have disappeared, and Yulina is all alone in the same open field. She wanders for three years, and still no sign of him, until she sights a raven. She questions the raven about her husband, and the raven tells her it saw her husband drying his tears behind nine mountains. Yulina asks the raven to take her beyond nine mountains, to her husband. The story explains Vasil was working for a witch for three years, and stops by a well to rest, when he sees Yulina coming to him. They return to her father's castle and celebrate a new wedding.

In a local tale titled Ukrainian: «Красносвіт», lit. 'Krasnosvit', collected by Mykhailo Pavlyk from an informant named Paraska Gulei in Vyzhnytsia and published in journal Zhyte i slovo, a childless man goes in the forest and finds a nice egg he brings home and shows his wife. They place the egg on the stove, and the man watches it. Suddenly, the egg hatches and a small-sized and handsome youth emerges from the egg. He says his name is Krasnosvit, and wants to be their son. He also asks the man to propose to the tsar's daughter the following morning. The man goes to the tsar's palace and explains he has a son named Krasnosvit, handsome but who lives inside an egg. The tsar lets his daughter see him for herself and decide if she wants to marry him. Thus, the old man gives Krasnosvit's egg and advises her to warm the egg at night. The princess does as instructed and sees how handsome her prospective bridegroom is, then decides to marry him. The princess is married to the egg, and at night Krasnosvit comes out of it, only to return by it in the morning. This goes on for some time, and Krasnosvit is almost at the end of the curse, but the princess is unaware of this. Some time later, an old woman asks the princess how she can live in such a way, and convinces her to break his eggshell. The princess breaks the eggshell that same night when Krasnosvit is not there, but finds the covering destroyed and laments that he is done for. Three drops of blood fall out of the princess's nose on his shirt. Krasnosvit materializes iron hoops around her belly, iron shoes on her feet and an iron cane in her hand, cursing her not to give birth to their child until she finds him again. With this, he vanishes. The princess cries for her loss and goes in search for him, first by reaching the end of the world, and beyond. She then passes by the houses of the Frost ("Moroz", in the original) and his wife (where she gains a golden apple), the Moon and his wife (where she gains a golden duck) and the Wind and his wife (where she gains a golden sliver). In the Wind's house, his wife hides the princess and makes her listen to their conversation: Krasnosvit is living with a wicked queen and spends his days hunting. After the Wind leaves, his wife gives the princess directions: reach a pond, then a garden by the pond. The princess follows the directions and finds the wicked queen washing a bloodied shirt in the pond. The queen says the shirt belongs to a servant, but the princess recognizes it as Krasnosvit's. She asks if she can wash it, and the blood drops vanish. In gratitude, the queen lets the princess accompany her to her garden. While the queen is away, the princess takes the golden apple, which draws the attention of the queen's children. The queen asks the princess to have the apple, and she trades it for one night with Krasnosvit. The queen agrees to a deal, but places Krasnosvit under a heavy sleep, so that the princess cannot wake him up. She fails for the first night, and trades the golden duck for the second night in Krasnosvit's room. The queen places him under another sleep, and the princess cannot wake him again. The next morning, a servant of Krasnosvit's tells him a girl comes to his room at night and cries over his sleeping body. Krasnosvit then breaks off three twigs of some small plants ("однолітки"), gives to his servant and tells him to deliver them to the girl for her to hit his sleeping body to wake him up. On the last night, the princess trades the golden sliver with for a last night with the queen, who places Krasnosvit under a heavy sleep. The princess enters his room and begs him to let her give birth. His servant appears and gives her the twigs, which she uses on her husband. Krasnosvit wakes up; the hoops fall from the princess's body and she gives birth to her son. The wicked queen enters the room and curses the princess, but Krasnosvit hits her with the three twigs and she vanishes. The tale was classified, in the East Slavic Folktale Classification (Russian: СУС, romanized: SUS), as the more general type SUS 400/1, Russian: Муж ищет исчезнувшую или похищенную жену (жена ищет мужа), romanized: Muzh ishchet ischeznuvshuyu ili pokhishchennuyu zhenu (zhena ishchet muzha), lit. 'Man in search for lost or kidnapped wife (Wife searches for husband)': the husband of wife promises not to break a prohibition, but does and loses their spouse; later, they go in search of their spouse and finds them with wonderful help.

== See also ==
- Again, The Snake Bridegroom (Serbian tale)
- The Serpent Prince (Hungarian tale)
- Trandafiru
- The Enchanted Pig
- Enchanted Balaur (Romanian fairy tale)
