= Enchanted Balaur =

Romanian fairy tale

Enchanted Balaur (Romanian: Balaurul fermecat) is a Romanian fairy tale collected by author T. Popovic and published in 1908. It is related to the international cycle of the Animal as Bridegroom or The Search for the Lost Husband: a human maiden marries an animal that is a prince in disguise, breaks a taboo and loses him, and she has to seek him out.

The story shares motifs with other tales of the region, like Serbian Again, The Snake Bridegroom, and Hungarian The Serpent Prince: the heroine must search for her husband under a curse not to bear their child until he touches her again. Other Romanian tales of the same classification are The Enchanted Pig, wherein the enchanted husband is a pig, and Trandafiru, wherein the enchanted husband is a pumpkin.

== Source ==
The tale was collected by author T. Popovic and published in magazine Ion Creangă, in 1908. According to Popovic, the story was sourced to Bogdănești-Bîrlad and provided by his mother, who heard it from his grandmother, Maria Peiu, in Bogdănești, Fălciu, around 1840.

== Summary ==
An old couple live alone and suffer for not having children to brighten up their days. One night, the male half of the couple has an idea to go on a pilgrimage to God to be granted a son. The next day, the old man goes on a long journey outside the village and stops to rest under a willow tree and eat the food his wife prepared him. Suddenly, he sees a little snake in the grass eating the crumbs and, thinking the animal is a sign from God, takes the snake back home. He and his wife feed it with milk and place it in a pantry when the snake grows overnight.

One day, the snake calls for his adoptive parents and asks them to woo the emperor's daughter on his behalf. The old couple is afraid at first for the snake to talk, but agree to fulfill his request, so the old man goes to talk to the emperor. After the emperor learns his prospective son-in-law is a snake (balaur), he demands that he builds a copper palace in the place of the hut and a copper bridge connecting the palace to the emperor's castle. The old man reports to the snake, who assures his father not to worry about. At night, the snake removes his snakeskin, becomes a handsome youth and waves his snakeskin in the four corners of the hut to turn it into a copper palace. The emperor is impressed, but demands that a silver palace is built in place of the copper one. The snake son repeats the magic and creates a silver palace with a silver bridge. Lastly, the emperor requests that a golden palace is built with a connecting golden bridge, with golden trees that yield jewelled flowers along the way, singing birds on the trees and a fountain in front of the emperor's castle. Once again, the snake son fulfills the emperor's request. Defeated, the emperor agrees to marry his daughter to the poor couple's snake son.

The princess is taken to the bridal chambers and waits for the snake by praying to God, but is relieved to see a handsome youth. they spend the night together and the youth returns to the snakeskin in the morning, asking his wife not to tell anyone about it. They fall into a routine. Half a year later, the empress pays a visit to her daughter and questions how her daughter is able to live with a snake. The princess then reveals her snake husband is actually a handsome man underneath the serpentine disguise, and the empress suggests she burns the snakeskin in the stove with fire and salt. On the same night, the princess takes the snakeskin when her husband is asleep and destroys it. The snake husband, who the tale explains is an emperor's son cursed by a snake into balaur form for seven years for killing the snake's young, wakes up with a start, admonishes his wife for her mistake, since he had still three days for the curse to end. He then tells his wife to search for him in steel shoes and with a steel crutch, and curses that an iron hoop will circle her womb and not let her give birth to their son until he lays a hand on her. With this, he vanishes, and so do the bridge and the palace.

The princess mourns for her husband and goes after him in steel apparel, passing by the huts of Sfânta-Mercure (Holy Wednesday), where she gains a golden fork, a self-moving golden shaft and golden spindle, then the hut of Sfânta-Vineri (Holy Friday), where she gains a golden hen with chicks, and the hut of Sfânta Duminica (Holy Sunday). The princess helps Holy Sunday in feeding her animals, and in return Holy Sunday summons the animals, beasts and birds to give out the princess's husband's location, to no avail. A returning hultan (eagle) appears and says it saw a prince shooting it. Holy Sunday orders the eagle to take the princess and prepares provisions for the aerial journey: 100 oxen, 100 cartloads of bread and 160 barrels of wine, to feed the eagle on the way there. Holy Sunday also gives the princess a bottle with a liquid to remove stains and bids the princess good luck. After a long journey, the provisions are consumed and the princess cuts up a piece of her leg to feed the eagle, but the bird returns the meat to the princess's flesh and thanks her.

After reaching a marvellous palace, the princess takes out the golden objects to draw out the attention of the local empress's maidservant. The maidservant reports to the empress about the golden objects, and the monarch wishes to have them. The princess trades them for a night with the now human snake prince, and tries to wake him in the first two nights, begging him to touch her, to no avail. On the third night, the princess notices the maidservant is trying to wash some stains on a shirt and convinces her to let the princess wash it. The princess uses the bottle with the liquid and washes the shirt, bargaining for a last night with the prince. Still, the prince is asleep, when a tear falls from the princess's eyes and wakes him up. He then touches his wife's belly and she gives birth to a handsome son. Their son turns the palace into a golden apple and they all return home. The prince executes the false bride by tying her to two horses, restores his adoptive parents' golden palace and reigns with his wife in his father-in-law's stead.

== Analysis ==
=== Tale type ===
The tale is classified in the Aarne-Thompson-Uther Index as type ATU 425A, "The Animal (Monster) as Bridegroom". In this tale type, the princess burns the husband's animal skin and she must seek him out, even paying a visit to the Sun, the Moon and the Wind and gaining their help.

In tale type ATU 425A, the heroine journeys far and wide to encounter her husband, and finds him at the mercy of a second spouse. The supernatural husband, now human, is put to sleep by the magic potion of the second spouse, so that the heroine has no chance of rescuing him.

=== Motifs ===
==== The snake husband ====
Romanian (Transylvanian Saxon) scholar Adolf Schullerus, in his 1928 index of Romanian tale types, identified that the bridegroom appeared as a pig in most of the available variants at the time (twelve texts), followed by a serpent (eight texts). In that regard, ethnologue Ovidiu Birlea noted that the enchanted husband in Romanian variants "usually" appears under a snakeskin or a pigskin: per his 1966 study, the enchanted husband is a snake in 25 variants and pig in 17 (18 in a 1971 study), assuming other forms in other texts, like a hedgehog, a crayfish, a frog and even a pumpkin.

==== Fulfilling the king's tasks ====
According to Jan-Öjvind Swahn and Georgios A. Megas, the motif of the animal suitor fulfilling the king's tasks before he marries the heroine appears in variants from Eastern Europe and the Near East, and in Romania in subtypes 425A and 425L.

==== The heroine's pregnancy ====
According to Adolf Schullerus, one of the "characteristic features" of most of the Romanian variants is that, after the burning of his animal skin, the husband wraps hoops around the heroine's body and curses her not to bear their children until he places his arm around her body; after the curse is lifted, the heroine gives birth to a golden-haired son.

In addition, in Balkanic variants of the tale type, the supernatural husband curses his wife not to give birth to their child for a long period of time until she finds him again. Likewise, according to Lithuanian professor Bronislava Kerbelyte, similar tales from Hungary, Romania and Moldova contain the motif of the supernatural husband wrapping iron hoops around the heroine's belly so she cannot give birth to their child until he lays a hand on her again.

==== The heroine's journey ====
According to Hungarian folklorist Ágnes Kovács, Romanian tales of the "Snake Bridegroom" may show two versions (or redactions): either the mother-in-law burns the man's snakeskin, but he stays with his human bride, or the snakeskin is burnt and the husband disappears. The latter sequence prompts the husband's curse of the long pregnancy and the wife's quest for her husband.

In a study published posthumously, Romanian folklorist Petru Caraman noted that, in Romanian and in some South Slavic variants, instead of meeting the Sun, the Moon and the Wind on the way to her husband, the heroine finds incarnations of the days of the week, like Holy Wednesday (ro) and Holy Friday (ro). They function the same as the elements and gift the heroine with golden objects. French philologist Jean Boutière, in his doctoral thesis, analysed the variants available at the time and concluded that the heroine seeks the help of Holy Wednesday, Holy Friday and Holy Sunday (which are sometimes replaced by Holy Monday and Holy Saturday), and, rarely, of the Moon, the Sun and the Wind.

According to Ovidiu Bîrlea, "in most variants" of type ATU 425, the heroine passes by incarnations of the days of the week, "often" Holy Wednesday, Holy Friday and Holy Sunday.

==== The gifts from the helpers ====
According to Hans-Jörg Uther, the main feature of tale type ATU 425A is "bribing the false bride for three nights with the husband". In fact, when he developed his revision of Aarne-Thompson's system, Uther remarked that an "essential" trait of the tale type ATU 425A was the "wife's quest and gifts" and "nights bought".

Jean Boutière also wrote that the heroine's three helpers (the days of the week) gift her with golden objects (one gift from each helper): a self-moving distaff, a self-moving reel and a hen with chicks - objects that, he noted, are "endowed with movement".

In Birlea's study of Romanian folklore, the days of the week help and guide the heroine through her journey to find the missing husband and give her marvellous objects of gold or silver that she will use to buy three nights on her husband's bed: spindle, fork, golden caier, a hen or a duck, golden apples, golden table, doves, a piglet, or nuts that produce dresses.

== Variants ==
=== Romania ===
==== The Old Man's Serpent ====
Romanian folklorist Dumitru Stăncescu collected a variant titled Şarpele moşului ("The Old Man's Serpent") from informant Ion Georgescu. In this tale, a poor old couple wants to have a son, so the man chooses to find any creature to adopt as a son. The man finds a serpent with a human face and adopts it as his son. After 15 years, the human-faced serpent begins to talk to his parents and explains he is an enchanted prince. Some time later, he wants to marry the local king's daughter. The king orders the serpent suitor to some pre-marriage tasks: to build an iron bridge, a silver bridge and a golden bridge between the old couple's hut and the palace. The serpent suitor advises her adoptive father on how to summon magical help from other snake servants to build the bridges. After fulfilling the tasks, the princess marries the serpent. On their wedding night, the serpent takes off his nine snakeskins and becomes human, but in the morning he wears them again. After a year, the king tells his daughter to burn the snakeskins in an oven. The serpent husband sees his wife preparing the oven and she tells him she will bake bread. That night, while husband is asleep, she takes the snakeskins into the oven. The husband wakes up and curses his wife not to give birth to their child, until she wears out iron garments, and three iron circles around her belly fall out. He disappears. The princess, pregnant, goes after him. On the way, she meets the incarnation of Saint Monday (Sfintei Luni), who gives her a golden hen with golden chicks, and tells her that down in a ravine a man lives with a fairy woman. She goes to the place at the ravine and tries to wake her husband up, but to no avail. She then meets the incarnation of Holy Friday (Sfânta Vineri), who gives her a golden boar to trade for her husband. Once again, she fails. Lastly, she goes to the incarnation of the Holy Saturday (Sfânta Sâmbătă), who gives her two golden pigeons. She gives the pigeons to the fairy woman and enters her husband's quarters to awaken him. He wakes up and touches her wife, and releases her from the iron circles around her belly.

==== Dinu Fat-Frumos ====
Writer and folklorist Cristea Sandu Timoc collected a Romanian variant from teller Lăpădat Maria and published it with the title Dinu Făt-Frumos. In this tale, a childless couple suffers for having no son. Out of desperation, they agree to take the first creature they find as their son. The old man finds a snake and brings it home. The couple raises the snake son until he grows up, and, one day, he tells them he wants to marry the princess. He asks his mother to go to the king's court and propose to her in his name. The king scoffs at the proposal and tells her that her son must perform some tasks first: to pave the way with gold and silver overnight and to build a place more splendid that the king's. The snake son does and he marries the princess. At night, the snake son takes off his snakeskin and becomes a man, to the princess's delight, but slithers back into the snakeskin at dawn. This goes on for some time, until, one night, the princess heats off the oven to burn her husband's snakeskin. He wakes up, scolds her and beats her nose, drawing three drops of blood. He then curses her: the three drops of blood shall remain so, and she cannot give birth to their child until he returns to her in nine years' time, and vanishes. Time passes, and her belly grows so large with each passing year, she attaches an iron ring around it, one for each year. She decides to go after him and asks the Sun and the Wind for directions. God takes pity on her and gives her three golden items: a golden hen with five golden chicks, a golden spinning wheel and a golden yarn. The Wind carries her to the palace of the Fairy Empress. The Fairy Empress sees the three golden objects and wants them, but the princess exchanges each one for one night with her husband. On the first two nights, the man does not wake up, but she insists and he wakes up. The man puts his hand on her belly and their child is born.

==== About the snake born by a woman ====
In a tale from Siebenbürgen, published by author Franz Obert in German language magazine Das Ausland with the title Von der Schlange, die ein Weib gebar ("About the Snake that a Woman gave birth to"), a couple that have been together for 20 years long for a child. One day, the woman passes by a garden and smells a flower. She becomes pregnant and gives birth to a snake, which she feeds with milk. After 10 years, the snake - the size of a balaur - asks his parents to ask for the hand of the emperor's daughter in marriage. The princess asks for her suitor to build a palace, with fruitful trees alongside a road between both palaces. The snake fulfills the task and marries the princess. On the wedding night, he takes off his snakeskin and becomes a prince. Time passes, and the princess takes off the snakeskin to burn it in the oven. The snakeskin is burnt, and her husband curses the princess not to give birth to their child until he places his hand on her again, then some iron rings involve her belly. The snake son (now human) disappears and works for another king as a cowherd. He takes the cows to graze in a forest that belongs to a Zmeu, which attacks him. The cowherd defeats the zmeu and gains the king's favour and the hand of the king's daughter. At the same court, the princess (the Emperor's daughter), who has been searching for her husband for 20 years, recognizes him and goes to his room at night, to plead for him to touch her belly so she can give birth to their son. The man awakes and touches her.

==== The Old Man's Son ====
Romanian folklorist Lazăr Șăineanu summarized another Transylvanian tale titled Ficiorul moşului or Feciorulǔ Moşului ("Old Man's Son"). In this tale, an old woman raises a snake child. When he is of age, he asks for the princess's hand in marriage. They marry. On the wedding night, the snake man takes off the snakeskin and becomes a human man. The princess takes the snakeskin and burns, but her husband curses her not to give birth to their child until he places his hand on her, and iron rings spring around her belly. She begins her long quest, and is helped by St. Miercuri (Holy Wednesday), who gives her a shirt made of cobwebs; by St. Veneri (Holy Friday), who gives her a fuse of golden threads, and by St. Dumineca (Holy Sunday), who gives her a bag of cobwebs. The princess, heavily pregnant, finds her husband as a servant, working under Muma Padurii, a witch that lives in the forest. The princess bribes Mama Padurii to talk to her husband, and manages to make him remember. According to Romanian scholarship, the tale was printed in political publication ''Tribuna'', by one Oreste.

==== The Forgotten One ====
Saineanu summarized a third Transylvanian tale titled Uitatulă or Uitatul (German: "Das Vergessene"; English: "The Forgotten One"). In this tale, an Emperor goes to war, and asks his three daughters what gifts he can find for them. The elder asks for a pair of earrings, the middle one a ring, and the third a flower unlike any other seen between Heaven and Earth. The emperor wins the war and finds the presents for his elder daughters, but forgets the youngest's. He reaches a castle with an enchanted garden, where he finds the flower. However, a large dragon's head ("unŭ capŭ de balaurŭ") appears to him and demands the emperor gives up his youngest daughter to "Uitatul". The youngest daughter goes to Uitatulă and lives with him. She discovers he takes off his scales to becomes a handsome man. One day, she decides to burn the dragon scales. The human husband admonishes her that in three days time he would have been free from the curse, but now has to vanish, and curses his wife not to give birth to their child until he places his hands on her again. The princess ties iron rings around her belly and walks with an iron cane. She meets St. Luni (Holy Monday), who gives her golden tableware (two forks and a spoon); St. Miercuri (Holy Wednesday), who gives her two golden apples; and St. Vineri (Holy Friday), who gives her a golden chicken with 12 chicks. She also learns her husband is set to be married to another empress, and is advised to use the gifts the women gave her to lure the Empress. The princess uses the golden gifts to bribe the Empress for three nights with her husband, and manages to wake him on the third night. Her husband awakens and touches her belly, finally releasing her from her long pregnancy.

==== Ginŭ Costanginŭ ====
In a Romanian tale from Transylvania published in "Gazeta de Transilvania" with the title Ginŭ Costanginŭ, an old couple have three sons and three daughters, but their children die, leaving only a daughter named Safta. The old woman blames God, but He gives her a snake for a son. The old couple name him Ginŭ Costanginŭ, and raise him in secret. In time, the snake son grows so large his parents have to move him out to a shed. The snake son falls in love with a local maiden named Mărgeluţa, daughter of the local rich lord Mihia. The snake declares he will marry only Mărgeluţa and no one else, and his father goes to Mihai's house with the proposition. Mihai refuses to marry his daughter to a snake, unless he builds an iron bridge between their houses. The snake son fulfills his request and marries Mărgeluţa. On the wedding night, Ginŭ Costanginŭ takes off the snakeskin and becomes a handsome youth at night, but in the morning he wears it again. For two whole years, Ginŭ Costanginŭ and Mărgeluţa live like this, and the girl keeps his secret, until one day Mărgeluţa's mother pays her a visit and tells her about her husband's transformation. Mărgeluţa's mother consults with a priest, who says she should take the snakeskin and burn it. The next time, while her husband is asleep, Mărgeluţa takes the snakeskin and throws it in the fire. Ginŭ Costanginŭ smells the burning and notices his snakeskin is not there, so he curses his wife not to give birth until he touches her belly again, then vanishes. Mărgeluţa blames her mother and the priest, but, after two years, places an iron ring around her swollen belly, and begins to search for her husband. She passes by the houses of Sfânta Mercurĭ (Holy Wednesday), who gives her a self-moving golden distaff, then of Sf. Vinerĭ (Holy Friday), who gives her two golden apples, and finally to the house of sf. Duminecă (Holy Sunday), who gives her a golden hen with chicks. Sf. Duminecă also tells the girl her husband is inside a house near the church, and she is to stay by the fountain with the golden objects to draw the attention of the maidservants. The maidservants report to the mistress of the house about the girl at the fountain with the golden objects. This entices the mistress's curiosity, who brings Mărgeluţa to the house. The girl trades the golden objects for one night with Ginŭ Costanginŭ: she fails on the first two nights, but he wakes up on the third night and places her hand on her belly, allowing her to give birth to their children, a boy and a girl with golden hair. The mistress of the house, however, takes the children and buries them in the garden, and the twins go through a cycle of reincarnations (trees, beds, lambs and humans again). Ginŭ Costanginŭ takes the golden-haired twins to his second spouse's house for a banquet and bids them tell a story. The mistress of the house runs away from the scene, and Ginŭ Costanginŭ finally lives with his wife and children.

==== Minea, the Brave ====
In a Romanian tale collected by Dimitru Stancescu from a soldier named Dumitru Grigore, with the title Minea Viteazul ("Minea, the Brave"), an old couple have no children. One day, the old man announces he will find a son for them in the forest. He wanders until he reaches a tree and finds a baby snake near the roots of the tree. The man brings the snake home and feeds it with milk. The baby snake grows up and larger and has to be moved to a barrel and a jug, but the snake son bursts them open. After growing even larger, the snake son asks his parents to marry him off, and he has chosen the local emperor's daughter. The snake's adoptive mother goes to the emperor's palace for three days and nights, until the soldiers notice her and bring her to the emperor's presence. The old woman explains the situation to the monarch, who demands that the prospective bridegroom builds a large golden bridge between the palace and the old couple's house, with trees in bloom along the path and with two golden rams locked in battle. The old woman reports to her snake son, who, during the night, waves his tail three times, for he has magical powers and bullds the bridge. Impressed, the emperor marries his daughter to the snake, who is so large he occupies the whole church. The tale explains the snake is in fact a prince, cursed to be a snake by an old devil. On the wedding night, the prince removes his snakeskin and spends the night with the princess, then returns to the cursed disguise in the morning. In time, the princess wants to get rid of her husband's snakeskin and conspires with her mother: the princess takes the skin while her husband is asleep and throws it in a fire, as the disguise brings to crackle. The prince wakes up and runs to try to save his disguise, to no avail, save for three scales that jump off the oven: one turns into a self-moving golden furca, the second into a golden wheel, and the third into a golden hen with chicks. The prince admonishes his wife for her actions and the disaster brought upon themselves, then says he will venture into the world, curses the princess not to give birth until he places a hand on her again, and vanishes. The princess mourns for her lost husband and decides to go after him, so she takes the golden objects and wanders off for years. Finally, she reaches the house of Sfintei Duminece (Holy Sunday), where her husband is working. Holy Sunday promises the princess to let her husband touch her, but after he goes to sleep after a grueling day at work, and the princess rewards them with the golden objects. The princess cannot talk to him for the first two nights, but on the third night he touches the princess and she gives birth to their son, a boy of nine years, since the princess has spent nine years searching for her missing husband. The tale then continues with the adventures of the boy, called Minea Viteazul, who finds a pair of speaking bulls as his helpers, goes to fight a dragon and rescues a princess.

=== Moldova ===
In a Moldavian tale published by author and folklorist Grigore Botezatu with the title The Snake-Prince and the King's Daughter (Moldavian: Voinicul-șarpe și fata de împărat), an old couple have no children. One day, the old man decides to venture into the wide world in search of a son for them. He stops by a little well to drink water, and finds that a little snake sneaked into his bag. He brings the snake home to is wife and feeds with milk and nut kernels. After four days, the snake grows so large and asks their parents to find them a wife, the king's daughter. The old man goes to the king to offer his snake's son proposal, but he is beaten and cast out of the castle. The snake son swallows his father to restore his health and, after spitting him out, insists he tries again with the king. The king listens to the proposal, but asks for a task first: to level a mountain into a valley, build a mill in it, then plant wheat, harvest it, grind it into flour, bake bread and deliver it to the king - all of this overnight. The snake son whistles and summons an army of snake servants to fulfill the task for him. The second task is for the sea to beat just below the castle's window, and, on the other side of the sea, for a vineyard to be planted and for the grapes to be ripe just before sunrise. The third task is to build a golden road between the king's castle and the bridegroom's house, with golden bridges, golden trees with golden fruits and singing golden birds. He fulfills the tasks and marries the king's daughter. After the wedding feast, they retire to their new home, and the snake son takes off his snakeskin to reveal he is a human prince beneath it. They live like this for some time, until one day, the queen asks her daughter about her married life. The princess reveals he is a snake by day and a man by night, and the queen suggests she puts some hot coals under his side of the bed, so that, when he stretches his legs, the snakeskin will fall on the coals and burn. The princess follows the instructions and lets the snakeskin burn on the hot coals. The snake youth wakes up and tells that his curse would be undone in three days, then curses his wife to have three iron rings around her maiden's girdle, so that she cannot bear their son, and departs. The princess goes after him and meets the Holy Wednesday, who gives her three golden apples; the Holy Friday, who gives her a gold spinning reel, and the Holy Sunday, who gives her a silk handkerchief embroidered with gold. Lastly, she reaches her destination where her husband is to be found: the land of the fairies, a kingdom where the water is blue, the fields are gold and the grass is green. She uses the presents from her helpers to buy three nights in her husband's bed, wakes him and lets him touch the iron rings, so she can give birth to their son.

=== Romani people ===
Transylvanian linguist Heinrich von Wlislocki collected and published a tale from the Romani with the title Das Schlangenkind ("The Snake-Child"). In this tale, a poor couple laments not having a son. One day, the woman is fetching firewood in the forest and sees a beautiful flower. She leans down to get it, but the flower is pulled down in the ground. The woman tries to pluck it, but feels that something is pulling it down. The woman lets it be, but mutters to herself that at least she gets to smell it. The woman goes back home and senses she is pregnant. Her husband comments that the event might be the work of a "p(s)huvush" (Romani language: pçuvuš, a sort of earth spirit). Nine months later, the woman gives birth to a snake, and the couple decide to shelter it from the world at large by hiding it in a dark room in their house. Twenty years pass, the snake son wishes to see the outside world, but his mother warns him against it since people might hurt or kill him. The snake son tells his mother not to worry: whenever people try to attack him, sparks fly out of the snake's body to injure the people, so he is left alone. Near the couple's house, a widow lives with her daughter, who is kind to the snake son, throwing him apples to feed him. The snake son talks to the girl he wants to marry her, and she answers that she will marry him if he fills her apron with gold. The snake son approaches her and spits gold coins from his mouth into her apron. The girl marries him. On the wedding night, the snake son asks his wife to spit at his mouth three times. The girl obeys; the snake son takes off the snakeskin and becomes a handsome youth. They live like this for a year. The girl, however, decides to burn the snakeskin and keep him in human form for good. One night, she takes the snakeskin and burns it in the oven. The snake husband wakes up and tries to salvage whatever can remain of the snakeskin, but cannot, so he curses his wife not to give birth until he touches her again, as a payback for burning his snakeskin. Metal rings circle her belly, while her husband goes to another village to work as a cowherd for a farmer. The man goes to the margin of the river and thinks about his wife, then spits at the river. A little fish swallows the saliva and swims next to the pregnant wife's house. She catches the fish and cooks it. After she eats the fish, she gives birth to her child. Later, she goes in search of her husband and finds him.

== See also ==
- The Sprig of Rosemary
- The Enchanted Snake
- Prince Crawfish
- About the astonishing husband Horu

== Bibliography ==
- Caraman, Petru [in Romanian] (2009). Ion H. Ciubotaru; Ioana Repciuc (eds.). "Identificarea episodului despre Cupidon şi Psyche, din romanul "Metamorphoses" al lui Apuleius, cu un basm autentic popular" [Identification of the Episode on Cupidon and Psyche, in the Novel Metamorphoses by Appuleius, with An Authentic Folk Fairy Tale]. Anuarul Muzeului Etnografic al Moldovei (in Romanian) (9). Editura Palatul Culturii: 11–85.
