= Trandafir =

Trandafir may refer to:

- Adriana Trandafir, Romanian theater and film actress
- Norbert Trandafir, Romanian swimmer
- Teo Trandafir, Romanian television presenter, former producer, actress, radio presenter and politician
- Trandafiru, Romanian fairy tale and the protagonist thereof
