= Again, The Snake Bridegroom =

Serbian folktale about a snake bridegroom

Again, The Snake Bridegroom (Serbian: Опет змија младожења, Opet zmija mladoženja; German: Wieder vom Schlangenbräutigam) is a Serbian folktale collected in the 19th century by Serbian philologist Vuk Karadžić, featuring the marriage between a human maiden and a husband in serpent guise.

The tale is related to the international cycle of the Animal as Bridegroom or The Search for the Lost Husband, in that a human maiden marries an animal that is a prince in disguise, breaks a taboo and loses him, and she has to seek him out. It shares motifs with other tales of the region, like Hungarian The Serpent Prince and Romanian Trandafiru and Enchanted Balaur: the heroine is cursed by her husband not to bear the child she is carrying, until he places a hand on her again.

== Translations ==
The tale was also translated to English as The girl who got married to a snake and to French as Encore un serpent nouveau marié.

== Summary ==
A childless queen prays to God for a child, even if it is a snake. God answers her prayers and a snake child is born. They raise the child for years and finally the snake talks to its parents: he wants a bride. His parents arrange a marriage for him with a peasant girl and they marry. Some time later, the girl appears pregnant and the queen questions how that is possible if her son is a snake. The girl reveals her husband takes off the snake skin at night and becomes a handsome man. The queen delights at this information and tells her daughter-in-law she should burn the snakeskin to keep him in human form for good.

That night, the girl burns the skin, causing her angered husband to leave, who tells his wife she shall not give birth until she finds him again after a long journey wearing down a pair of iron shoes and an iron rod. The girl goes on her quest and passes by the Mother of the Sun (who gives her a golden loom and distaff with golden flax and a golden spindle), the Mother of the Moon (who gives her a golden hen with golden chicks) and the Mother of the Winds (who gives her a golden loom with golden yarn)

The Wind directs her to another kingdom, where her husband has married another empress. The girl then ostentatiously sets up her golden loom and starts spinning, releasing the golden hen and chicks, to catch the Empress's attention, who covets these golden items. The girl bargains for the privilege to spend three nights with her husband: on the first two, he does not respond to her plea, because he has drunk a sleeping potion, but on the third night, he listens to her plight and touches her belly. Their child is born (a golden-haired, golden-armed boy), and they return home.

== Analysis ==
=== Tale type ===
The tale is classified in the Aarne-Thompson-Uther Index as type ATU 425A, "The Animal (Monster) as Bridegroom".

This tale type has an introductory part and a main part. The introductory part (that falls under many patterns) explains how an animal son is begotten, and his gaining a bride. In the main portion, the young bride (often at the instigation of relatives) burns the husband's animal skin, which causes the husband to go away, and the bride is forced on a quest to find him (sometimes while wearing iron shoes). The Sun, the Moon and the Wind guide her. Typically when the bride reaches a castle where she finds her husband, a false bride has assumed the place of the wife, and typically, the bride infiltrates by hiring herself out a maid. She bargains the precious golden items of the Sun, Moon, and Wind, to spend three nights with her husband, who is drugged by a soporific except on the third night when he spills the potion, and recognizes her. In Balkanic variants of the tale type, the supernatural husband curses his wife not to give birth to their child for a long period of time until she finds him again.

In tale type ATU 425A, the heroine journeys far and wide to encounter her husband, and finds him at the mercy of a second spouse. The supernatural husband, now human, is put to sleep by the magic potion of the second spouse, so that the heroine has no chance of rescuing him.

Others of this type include The Black Bull of Norroway, The Brown Bear of Norway, The Daughter of the Skies, East of the Sun and West of the Moon, The Tale of the Hoodie, The Sprig of Rosemary, and White-Bear-King-Valemon.

=== Motifs ===
According to Hans-Jörg Uther, the main feature of tale type ATU 425A is "bribing the false bride for three nights with the husband". In fact, when he developed his revision of Aarne-Thompson's system, Uther remarked that an "essential" trait of the tale type ATU 425A was the "wife's quest and gifts" and "nights bought".

In a study published posthumously, Romanian folklorist Petru Caraman noted that, in Romanian and in some South Slavic variants, instead of meeting the Sun, the Moon and the Wind on the way to her husband, the heroine finds incarnations of the days of the week, like Holy Wednesday and Holy Friday. They function the same as the elements and gift the heroine with golden objects.

== Variants ==
=== Slavic ===
In a South Slavic tale collected by Friedrich Salomo Krauss with the title Die entzauberte Schlange ("The Enchanted Snake"), a childless couple longs to have a son. The wife declares she wants a son, even if it is a snake, so a snake is born. The husband tries to convince the wife to kill it, but the snake tells them he will live out his days in the forest. The snake works as a swineherd. A king passes by the snake's herds and feels impressed by his efforts. The snake marries the princess, who rejects him at first until she sees his true human form at night. The princess tells her mother-in-law her discovery and she suggests to burn the snakeskin, which she does. The snake husband curses his wife to not give birth to their child until he embraces her, and for her ring to stay on her finger. The husband disappears; the princess gets the help of the Wind to take to where her husband is. Despite being classified as type 425A, this tale lacks the three nights bribe of the second spouse.

In a South Slavic tale collected by Ivan Krmpotić from Lici with the title Zmija mladoženja ("Snake Bridegroom"), an old woman lives alone, and utter she wishes to have a son, even if he is a snake. Thus, a snake appears to her, but he is in fact human underneath the snakeskin, and is so beautiful like the sun he shines. The emperor's daughter marries the snake son and plots to burn the disguise. She burns the snakeskin, and the tale explains he would have been released from the curse after four more nights, and he vanishes. The princess searches for her husband for nine years and reaches the house of the mother of the Sun, where she gains a golden "preslicu" (a distaff). She is directed to the house of the South Wind ("Jug"), where she gains a golden "pletivo" (knitting material), and guides her to the house of "Siverov", who knows everything. Siverov's mother gives the princess a golden hen with chicks. Finally, the princess reaches a castle and asks if they are in need of servants. The princess is hired as another servant, then takes out the golden hen with chicks. The local empress is stunned at the golden hen and wishes to have it; the princess makes a deal with the empress: the golden hen with chicks for a night with the king, as Siverov's mother instructed her to do. The princess tries to nudge her husband awake, who is the king, and begs him to touch her belly so that she can give birth to a golden-haired son. The king remains fast asleep for the empress gave him some soporific wine. The next morning, the king asks a servant about what happened last night, and a servant tells him about a woman crying for him to touch her belly. On the second day, the princess draws out the golden yarn and a golden spindle and distaff, and on the third day she takes out the yarn and some golden needles and begins to sew. The golden objects disappear, but the princess still has a golden apple given by the South Wind's mother, and makes a last trade. As for the king, he tells his servant to drop the wine the empress brings him, so that he does not fall asleep. The princess enters the king's chambers and the king places his hand on her, allowing her to give birth to a golden-haired son of nine years. The king makes the princess his queen and turns the empress into their servant.

==== Serbia ====
===== Beautiful Youth =====
In another Serbian tale, collected in Горња Крајина ("Gorya Krajina") by historian Vladimir Krasic and published in Letopis Matice Srpske with the title "Лијепи младић" (serbian latin: Lijepi mladić, "Beautiful Youth"), a man complains to his wife that they have no son, but will be happy even if they have a snake for a son. And so it happens: the woman gives birth to a snake. Time passes, and, when the snake is old enough, he asks his parents to find him a human bride. They choose a girl and they marry. On the wedding night, the bride is afraid at first of the snake husband, until he takes off the snakeskin and becomes the titular "beautiful youth". When morning comes, the youth wears the snakeskin again. This goes on for months, until one day, the snake son's mother asks the girl about their sleeping arrangements. The girl tells her mother-in-law that the snake becomes a youth at night, and the woman advises the girl to take the snakeskin after her son is asleep, and give it to her. The girl follows through with the suggestions and steals the snakeskin for her mother-in-law, who throws it into a fire. The youth wakes up, curses his wife not to give birth to their child until he place his hands on her, then vanishes. For three years, she waits, until she decides to go on a quest for him. She passes by the Sun and its mother (who gives her a "Медуља", a "medulya"), the Moon and his mother (who also gives her a "medulya"). Finally, she passes by the Vlašićs (Влашићи, Vlašići, which are the Pleiades constellation in Serbian folk astronomy), who give her a "medulya", and tell her to go to the "Belitarians" (which, according to a compiler's note, is a group of stars). The Belitarians welcome the girl and tell her where her husband is: he is under the power of some fairies, which can be bribed with the "medulyas" the girl received. The Belitarians take her there, and the girl gives the medulyas to the fairies. Her husband touches her body and she gives birth to their child, after an eleven year long pregnancy, then they both go back home.

===== King and Queen =====
In a dialectal Serbian tale published in the magazine Браство with the title Цар и царица ("King and Queen"), collected from Debra and surroundings, a queen, who is married to a king, complains to God that, despite her status and riches, she does not have a child, so she wishes for God to give her a snake son. Thus God grants her wish, and a snake is born to her. When he is twenty years old, the snake asks his parents to finds him a bride. The royal couple asks where they can find one that will agree to marry a snake, and he simply tells the queen to find a beggar girl when she goes to a certain house. She meets such a girl, and they marry the snake child. At night, the snake son takes off the snakeskin to become a handsome youth, which his wife knows. One day, the queen asks her daughter-in-law about the situation, and the girl tells her about the youth her husband becomes at night. The queen suggests the girl hides the prince's snakeskin. The girl does as instructed, the queen takes the skin and burns it. Sensing the burning wrong, the snake prince wakes up and curses his wife not to give birth to their child, and for her to wear down iron bars and iron staves in search for him. He vanishes, and the girl explains the situation to the king. The queen, her mother-in-law, urges her to fashion the iron bars and staves, and go first to the Mother of the Sun. The girl does this and reaches the house of Sun and his mother. Neither has seen the snake husband, and the Mother of Sun gives her a furka with a golden spindle. Next, she reaches the house of the Moon and his mother, where she gain a golden apple, and finally the house of the Wind and his mother. There, she learns from the Wind that her husband has married the princess of a kingdom. The Mother of the Wind gives her a golden hen with chicks, and she arrives at least in an imperial city. There, the princess finds the girl with the golden gifts and each time asks to buy them, but the girl trades each one for a night with the now human snake prince: the golden hen with chicks for the first night, the golden apple for the second night, and the furka for the third night. For the first two nights, the princess gives the prince a sleeping herb so he falls asleep, and the girl cannot wake him up. She succeeds on the third and final one, when she finally gives birth to their child, a boy with the sun on the front and a moon on the chest.

===== Snake Bridegroom (Oparić) =====
In a Serbian tale collected from a source in Levač with the title Змија младожења ("Snake Bridegroom"), an old woman prays to God to have a child, even if he is a snake. Thus, a snake is born to her, but he is only a snake by day, for he is human at night. One day, he tells his mother he wishes to marry. His mother questions who would marry a snake, but finds him a poor girl as his bride. In time, the girl becomes pregnant and tells her mother-in-law the snake son becomes a handsome man at night. The snake son's mother asks the girl to bring her her son's snakeskin, which he hides under the pillow. The girl does as instructed and the mother throws the snakeskin out of the window. The snake youth wakes up and admonishes his wife, cursing her not to give birth until she wears down three iron rings, three iron staves, and he lays a hand on her again, then vanishes. The girl becomes heavily pregnant, but cannot give birth, so she decides to go after her husband. She dons the iron apparel and journeys far and wide: she reaches the house of the Sun and his mother, where she learns her husband is living nearby with riches and a new family. The Sun advises her to take out the marvellous objects to draw the attention of her husband's new wife and ask to trade for a night in his quarters. The mother of the Wind gives her a golden loom, and the girl reaches her husband's location, where she takes out a golden hen with chicks, a golden reed and the golden loom. The snake youth's new wife, an empress, wishes to have the golden objects, but the girl trades them for a one with the snake youth. The empress gives him a soporific drink and he cannot wake up for the first two nights, as his true wife begs him to wake up and touch her. In the following morning, the servants tell the human snake youth about the girl that cries on his bed. On the third night, the snake youth avoids drinking the beverage the empress gives him. The girl enters the room and repeats her lament. He wakes up and touches her, allowing her to give birth to their son. The snake youth then takes his true wife and son and return home. The tale was originally collected from an informant named Арсић Милева (Mileva Arsic), from Oparic.

==== Croatia ====
Linguist Rudolf Strohal collected a Croatian tale in Grada Karlovaca (Karlovac), from informant Julijana Westerbach, with the title O gušćeru mladožejni ("The Lizard Bridegroom"). In this tale, a childless couple have no child, and pray to God for a son, even if it is a lizard. So God gives them a lizard as their son, who the couple raise. When he is fifteen years old, the lizard goes to the court of the Kraj in order to woo his daughter. The kraj, however, orders the lizard to carry an egg from his house to the courtroom, without letting it fall. Passing the first task, the kraj orders the lizard to come to his castle on a beautiful carriage, then to build a palace more beautiful than the kraj. Once he accomplishes the tasks, the lizard marries the kraj's daughter. The girl cries that she is to be married to the animal. One day, she meets an old woman, who advises her to take her husband's lizard skin at night and to burn it in the fire, so he can become a handsome man. The girl follows through with the suggestion, burns the lizard skin, and learns her husband is, in fact, a handsome man underneath it. However, he wakes up and, unable to find it, he tells his wife he knows what she did, and curses her not to give birth to their child until he places his hand on her. After nine years and unable to give birth, the girl goes on a quest for him. She first passes by the Vetro (the Wind), but he does not know. He gives her a golden chair and directs her to "Jug" (the Southern Wind). Jug also does not know the girl's husband's whereabouts, but gives her a golden distaff and a golden kuditu. Later, she finds Bura (the Northern Wind), who takes her to her husband location. Bura gives her a hen with chicks and tells her to go next to the house where her husband is, sit on the golden chair and take out the golden objects to draw the attention of her husband's second spouse. The girl follows the instructions and attracts the attention of the woman that lives in the house. The woman becomes interested in the golden objects, and the girl sells each of them for a night with her husband. For two nights, she fails. The wind Bura then warns the (now human) lizard not to drink the potion the woman at the house gives him. On the third night, the girl manages to wake her husband, he places his hand on her and she gives birth to their child. After their reunion, the pair goes back home.

In a Croatian tale collected by folklorist Maja Bošković-Stulli with the title Zmija mladoženja ("Snake Bridegroom") and translated to German as Der Schlangenbräutigam ("The Snake-Bridegroom"), a king and a queen have no children, and the queen notices that even a snake has children, so she prays to God to have a snake-child - and God grants her wish. A snake prince is born and spends his days in the garden. One day, he asks his mother to find him a bride. Despite the queen's doubts about any girl wanting to marry a snake, the snake son insists on marrying. The queen goes to a village and finds a beautiful girl, whom she convinces to come with her and live in the palace with the royal couple. The first girl shoos the snake away; the snake feels dejected and jumps on the girl's neck to strangle her. The next time, the snake asks his parents to find another bride. The queen looks for a poor maiden and takes her in. She marries the snake prince and also dies in the wedding chambers. Lastly, the queen brings a third maiden in. During the festivities, the third maiden allows the snake to eat with her. Due to her kindness, the snake prince takes off his snakeskin that night and shows himself to his wife to be a young man "beautiful as a golden apple". Time passes, and the girl becomes pregnant. The queen asks her daughter-in-law how she can be pregnant, since her son is a snake. The princess, who - the story explains - promised to keep her husband's secret, tells the queen that the snake son becomes human at night, and the queen convinces her to burn the snakeskin in the oven. That same night, the maiden throws the snakeskin in the oven. The human snake prince smells the burning and laments his wife's deed, since in ten days' time, his curse would have been lifted. He also curses his wife not to give birth to their child, until they meet again, then vanishes. After a period of grieving, the girl - heavily pregnant - begins her long journey to find her husband. She eventually meets three brothers quarreling about their father's inheritance: a pair of boots that can leap many leagues, a cloak of invisibility, and a cap that can shoot lightning. She tricks the brothers and steals the objects, then uses the boots to reach a large, almost impenetrable castle called "Kröte-Maria-Burg", where her husband is to marry its owner, Kröte-Maria. She stands near the door to the castle, wears the cloak, puts the cap on her head and shoots lightning to scare the guests. This draws her husband's attention, who rejoices that she has found him. The girl takes off the invisibility cloak and reveals herself. The (now human) serpent bridegroom then asks the wedding guests the riddle of an old and a new key, and the guests answer he should keep the old key. On hearing this, the serpent bridegroom goes back to his human wife, who finally gives birth to their son, and they return home.

In a Croatian tale collected in Kraljevica by author Fran Mikuličić with the title Mladić-gad lip kodi sunce ("Snake-youth beautiful as the sun"), a couple has no children, so the man tells his wife she can bear him any child, even if they are a snake. Thus one is born to them. Years pass, and the snake son asks his parents to find him a bride. The couple finds him a beautiful maiden, and the snake coils himself around the horse so they can go to the wedding. The snake and the maiden marry and retire to their chambers; the snake bridegroom takes off the snakeskin and becomes a youth as handsome as the sun and lies with his wife on their bed. They live like this for months. One day, the woman asks the girl about the snake son, and she tells her the snake son becomes a youth when he takes off the snakeskin at night. The snake's mother suggests they hide the snakeskin to keep him human forever, and the girl complies. That same night, the maiden steals the snakeskin, and his mother burns it. As soon as it burns, the snake son, in human form, wakes up and curses his wife not to give birth until he touches his hand on her again, and vanishes. After three long years, the maiden, pregnant, decides to go after him and passes by the house of the Sun and his mother, then the house of the Moon and his mother, the house of the "vlašićen", and lastly to "Jug" (the South Wind) and the "Belitarci", gaining from them "medalju". Finally, the maiden learns that the Vilas have the snake husband under their power, and goes to their lair. The girl uses the "medalju" to bribe the Vilas to be let in her husband chambers, so he can wake up and touch her belly. She manages to do it, and gives birth to their son. Reunited at last, the couple and their son return home. Serbian scholars noted that this tale was a variant of Vuk's.

Ethnographer Alexander Tietz published a tale collected in Romanian Banat with the title Der Junge in der Schlangenhaut ("The Youth in the Snakeskin"). In this tale, a rich couple have land and cattle, but no child. The woman goes to a well to draw water, sits there and prays to God to be given a son. One day, when she goes to fetch water, a snake coils around her arm. The woman asks if the snake is her son, and the snake nods with its head. The story then reveals the snake is actually a human child who died in his birth, buried, and turned into a snake by the Devil. The woman feeds the snake with milk. The snake grows up, and a neighbouring girl helps the woman in managing their cattle. The girl plucks gray hairs from the old woman, who leaves for a short while. The girl is alone with the snake, who begins to talk and assures her to have no fear, tells her he is human underneath the snakeskin and shows his human form to her. He also proposes to her and asks her not to reveal the truth to anyone, then resumes his snake shape. The girl tells the woman she wishes to marry the snake, and the three go to arrange their wedding with the girl's parents. The girl's parents question if this marriage would not bring shame to them, but still pay the bridal. That same night, the snake and the girl sleep together, he removes his snakeskin and shines like gold, then puts on the serpentine disguise in the morning. In time, the girl becomes pregnant, and they finally marry. The girl's mother asks her about her marriage to the snake, and the girl tells her about the human underneath the snakeskin. Her mother then suggests they burn the disguise, which her mother will steal that very night. Later that night, it happens thus, and the girl's mother burns it in the kitchen. The human snake wakes up, admonishes his wife for listening to her mother, curses her not to give birth until he places his hand on her body, and vanishes through the window. The girl laments her decision. After three years, she has a dream about going to Mother Sun and asking for her husband's whereabouts. The next morning, the girl dons some provisions and starts her journey to Mother Sun for answers. Mother Sun has not seen her husband, so she directs the girl to Brother Moon, who also does not know and leads her to Grandfather Wind. The Wind knows where her husband is, gives her a golden apple, and directs her to a fountain near some houses, where she is to draw out the apple and attract the attention of the local lady, with whom she is to trade the golden apple for a night in her husband's room. It happens thus, and the girl bribes the lady with the golden apple so she can talk to the snake youth. She enters his room and recognizes her husband, tries to nudge him awake by begging him to touch her, but he is fast asleep due to having drunk on zuika. The girl returns to the Wind and reports she found her husband, gaining a golden spindle with a golden distaff ("Kunkel"), for her to try a second time with the local lady. The girl fails again, but the maid has overheard the girl's lament and reports to her master, the snake youth, the following morning. The youth suspects the lady has drunk him, and the maid suggests he avoids drinking anything. As for the girl, the Wind gives the girl a golden hen with seven chicks and the same instructions: trade it for a night with her husband. The girl bribes the lady with the golden hen and enters her husband's room, while the maid has helped him avoid drinking the zuika. The girl begs the husband to touch her, he wakes up and places his hand on her body, and out comes a six-year-old son that recognizes the man as his father. The tale then explains the lady is a "Teufelsmutter", a devil-woman who is mother to snakes and toads, who works with child-killing women and turns the children into snakes and toads. The snake youth takes a pair of whetting stones and three eggs, then escapes with his wife and child through the window. The devil-woman goes after them, but the youth drops the objects behind them to create obstacles to deter her: each whetting stone creates a forest, which the devil-woman chops down with ease; the three eggs create a large stone, which blocks the devil-woman. The snake youth returns home to his family and they celebrate a new wedding. Hungarian scholar Ágnes Kóvács, in a review of Tietz's publication, sourced the tale from the Krashovani people.

==== Slovakia ====
Sorbian ethnologue Pawol Nedo, citing Václav Tille, mentions that the wolf and the snake appear as the form of the enchanted husband in Czech texts, while in Slovakia, per Jiri Polívka, only the snake is known as the prince's form.

In a Slovak tale collected by authors August Horislav Škultéty and Pavol Dobšinský with the title Hadogašpar ("Snake-Gaspar"), a king and a princess live in a distant kingdom. A fellow king marries the princess in a grand wedding ceremony. Years into their marriage, the now queen sees a snake in the garden and longs to have a child, even if it is a snake. So, a snake son is born to them. They name the snake son Hadogašpar. After twenty years, Hadogašpar wants to marry, but feels that no maiden will want to wed a snake. Feeling loneliness, Hadogašpar slithers away to a vast green meadow. There, a gray old man appears to him and directs the snake to a village where he may find a suitable bride. Hadogašpar slithers to the village, where a lonely maiden cries over not having a suitor. The maiden sees the snake in the water and declares she will marry the animal. The maiden and the snake marry. After the wedding, on the bridal bed, Hadogašpar asks his wife to kiss him. She does and Hadogašpar's snakeskin peels off, and he becomes a handsome prince. Hadogašpar asks his wife not to reveal anything to his mother, the queen, lest trouble befalls them. Come morning, Hadogašpar wears the snakeskin again. Time passes, and the girl becomes pregnant. Gossip begins to surround the couple, until one day the girl tells her mother-in-law about the human Hadogašpar to assuage any fear. That night, the queen takes her son's snakeskin, lights the oven and throws it in the oven to burn it. Suddenly, three large snakes leap at the human wife and circle around her belly, as Hadogašpar smells the burning and wakes up. The prince laments that his wife betrayed him, and curses her not to give birth to their child until Hadogašpar places his hand on her belly. He then disappears. Seven years pass, and the human wife - with a heavy, pregnant belly - asks for a pair of iron shoes to be made, and then begins a long quest. She passes reaches the house of the Mother of the Moon, where she gets a golden spindle (vretenice). Next, she passes by the house of the Mother of the Sun, where she gets a golden horsetail. Her last stop is by the house of the Mother of the Wind, where she gets a golden motovidielce. The Wind directs her to Hadogašpar's location: in a cave three mountains away, under the grasp of a furious Striga. The heroine walks to the cave and uses the golden objects on the Striga's servant to allow access to Hadogašpar, asleep on a stone slab, surrounded by nine snakes. On the third time, the heroine manages to wake Hadogašpar, he places his hands on his wife's belly and she gives birth to their son. Scholars Josef Spilka and Jaromir Jech classified the tale as type AaTh 425A.

==== Slovenia ====
Author Adolf Hauffen collected a German language tale from Gottschee. In this tale, a rich couple pray for a son, even if it is a little animal. They pray to have a little puppy, a little kitten, and a little snake. Their first two pleas were unanswered, but they eventually have their son, a little snake. When the snake is old enough, he asks for the most beautiful maiden in town as his bride. The girl is chosen, and tries to avoid the marriage to the snake, by climbing a ladder full of blades. The pain is too much for her, so he relents and marries the snake. On the wedding night, the girl cries for her fate, but the snake husband comforts her, by telling her that she can redeem him. He takes off the snakeskin and becomes a handsome man. He insists that the snake disguise is for their own sake. Eventually, the girl becomes increasingly irritated by the prolonged use of the snakeskin, and decides to burn it. The snake husband disappears, and she - heavily pregnant - goes after him in a long quest. After seven years, the girl meets a "white woman" on the way, who tells her that her (now human) snake husband in living with a sorceress, and gives her three "Spielzeuge". The girl uses the three Spielzeuge to bribe the sorceress for three nights with her husband, only managing to talk to her husband on the third night. She then gives birth to their child.

==== Bulgaria ====
A similar narrative is attested in the Bulgarian tale corpus, under tale type 425A, "Царската дъщеря, омъжена за змия (змей)" or "Die mit einer Schlange (Drachen) verheiratete Königstochter" ("The King's Daughter who married a snake/dragon"). In the Bulgarian tale type, the snake son is either found by a childless old couple or is born to one; he marries a princess and she breaks his trust; after his disappearance, the princess - pregnant - goes after him, and eventually finds the mother of the Sun, the mother of the Wind and the mother of the Moon, who gift her golden objects she uses to buy the right for a night with her husband. At the end of the tale, the heroine gives birth to her child.

In a Bulgarian tale collected by folklorist Mikhail Arnaudov from Elensko with the title "Мома омъжена за крилатъ змей" ("The Maiden married a Winged Dragon"), a couple prays to God to have a son, and He sends them a snake as their son. Some time later, the snake marries a human girl. One day, the snake's mother asks her daughter-in-law about the snake. The girl answers at first that she cannot tell, but, after some insistence, she reveals he is a dragon during the day and man by night. The snake's mother suggests her daughter-in-law burns the snakeskin. The girl follows through with the suggestion, but the snake (now human) curses his wife to search for him for nine years, through nine kingdoms, with an iron staff and iron rings around her belly, and not to give birth until he touches her belly, then disappears. The girl, pregnant, begins her long quest. After three years, she reaches the house of the Mother of the Wind. After the Wind comes, he does not know about her husband, and his mother gives the human girl three apples and three magic flowers (one to sate her hunger, one to help her cross the water, and one to make her invisible). Next, she reaches the house of the Mother of the Moon. The moon also does not know of his location, but his mother gives her a golden hurka (wikt:bg:хурка) (a type of rod for spinning). Lastly, the girl reaches the house of the Mother of the Sun. The Sun does know where the winged dragon is: he is now married to a princess in the kingdom. Before she departs, the Mother of the Sun gives her a golden hen with chicks, and advises her to use the golden gifts she gained to bribe the princess for three nights with her husband, each gift for each night. The human girl gives the princess the gifts and manages to wake her husband on the third night. The now human winged dragon touches his first wife and she gives birth to a son, then they depart back home.

In a Bulgarian tale published by author Nikolay Rainov with the title "Змейова невеста" ("The Bride of the Zmei"), a childless couple sighs that they have no children, until the man decides to leave home to look for any orphan they can adopt. The man sees a little girl holding an egg on a bridge and takes her in. The next day, the egg hatches and a little zmei comes out of it. The zmei begins to talk and tells the old couple they should adopt and raise him, since they also took the girl as their daughter. Thus, the old couple raises both the girl and the zmei: the girl is lazy and does not help with the chores, unlike the zmei, who is a dutiful son and helps the old couple. In time, the girl marries a man and leaves home to dwell with her husband, while the zmei also marries a human maiden and lives with their parents. The zmei's wife gives birth to a beautiful girl that produces gold coins when she cries and rose petals when she laughs, while the zmei's sister gives birth to an ugly child, and becomes jealous of her sister-in-law. One day, the zmei's sister pays a visit to her sister-in-law and asks her about her brother; the zmei's wife says she cannot tell anything, but, pressed by the zmei's sister, tells her he takes off the scaly skin at night and becomes a handsome man. The zmei's sister then dares her sister-in-law to take the scaly skin and burn it in the oven, so he becomes human permanently. The zmei's wife decides to follow through with the suggestion: she takes the scaly skin and burns it in the oven. The zmei, however, begins to feel a burning pain and realizes his wife betrayed his secret. He curses her that she shall seek him after nine years, beyond nine kingdoms, and in iron shoes and with an iron cane, which she will not take off until she touches him again, and vanishes. The zmei's wife tries to run away after him, but he has disappeared. The zmei's wife, then, puts on iron shoes and an iron cane, and begins her quest, but she does not know where to begin. She meets a man who tells her to seek the Wind, another suggests she seeks the Sun, and a third one she should consult with the Moon. After three years, she reaches the house of the Wind and his mother, who give her three golden apples and three magical flowers to open the way for her: one can open the way in the forest, the second can part the seas, and the third can open up two steep rocks blocking the way. After another three years, she reaches the house of the Moon and his mother, who give her a golden hurka. Lastly, after nine years, she reaches the house of the Sun and his mother. The Sun tells her that the zmei has married a princess from a nearby kingdom, and gives the zmei's wife a singing golden bird, advising her to use the golden objects to draw the princess's attention and trade them for a night with her husband. The zmei's wife follows the Sun's advice and takes out the golden apples, the golden hurka and the golden bird to bribe the princess for a night with the zmei, one gift for each night. She fails on the first two nights, but, on the next day, the zmei's wife releases the singing golden bird which flies about. The princess tries to catch it and falls to her death. The zmei wakes up and embraces his wife, forgiving her. The zmei and his true wife return home after nine years and find their daughter has had adventures of her own with her aunt, the zmei's adoptive sister.

==== Czech Republic ====
Sorbian ethnologue Pawol Nedo, citing Václav Tille, mentions that the wolf and the snake appear as the form of the enchanted husband in Czech texts, while in Slovakia, per Jiri Polívka, only the snake is known as the prince's form.

In a Czech tale collected by journalist Matěj Mikšíček with the title Bílý medvěd and translated by Alfred Waldau as Der weisse Bär ("The White Bear"), a queen longs to have a son. A white bear is born to her. When the bear prince is older, he asks to be married. The queen invites princesses to a ball for his son to choose his bride. The bear chooses a princess and marries her. On the wedding night, he kills the princess in a fit of rage. The bear marries another princess and also kills her. Some time later, the bear prince goes on a hunt and finds a shepherd's hut, with his daughter inside. The bear prince falls in love with the girl and wants to marry her. The shepherd's daughter comes to the castle, marries the prince and spends the night with him. The girl prays to God, the bear takes off the bearskin and becomes a man, and tells his wife to keep the secret between them. Some time later, the queen asks her new daughter-in-law about the bear son, and she tells the queen the secret. The bear disappears. The shepherd's daughter goes after him: she passes by the houses of the mother of the Moon, the mother of the Sun and the mother of the Winds. Each cooks a chicken soup for them, and tell her to take the bones with her. The Moon, the Sun and the Wind also give the girl a little box. The Wind summons the wind Melusine, (Note: In Czech and Slovak, the word meluzína refers to wailing wind, usually in the chimney. This is a reference to the wailing Melusine looking for her children.) who says the white bear husband is atop a glass mountain. The girl finds her husband in human form, and discovers he is to marry someone else. The girl asks Melusine to take her to her parents' hut. The wind does, but the girls discovers her parents have long since died. She returns with the wind to the glass mountain and takes a job offer in the castle atop the glass mountain. She decides to open the little boxes the elements gave her: inside, three beautiful dresses, one of silver, the second of gold and the third of diamond. The shepherd's daughter uses the three dresses to buy three nights with her husband from the second spouse, and manages to wake him up on the third night.

Author Božena Němcová published a Czech tale titled O bílém hadu ("The White Snake"): an old woman goes to the woods and finds a white snake on the ground, coiled and asleep. The old woman rakes it in her basket and brings the snake home to her husband. The old couple treat it as a son, giving it food. Years later, the white snake tells the man he wants to marry Bela, the local prince's daughter. The old man goes to woo the prince's daughter for the snake; but the prince sets a condition: the white snake must come on a golden road, on a carriage with silver wheels, led by white horses with pearl adornments. The old man reports back to the white snake, who arranegs everything and arrives at the prince's castle with the carriage. By the prince's own word, his daughter is to be given to snake as its bride. On the wedding night, the snake asks for a kiss, and reluctantly, the girl kisses it. The snake becomes a man. The next morning, the man tells her he is an enchanted prince, and he must not lose the snakeskin, lest they part and never see each other. By his wife's suggestion, the man gives his wife the snakeskin to be hidden under the pillow. Then they go a celebration in the couple's honor, the man kisses her, but she senses something wrong. She rushes back home and cannot find the snakeskin, since her husband disappeared. The girl searches for her husband, but cannot find him, so she rests up by a well near a willow tree and falls asleep. When she awakes, a lady in white appears before her and tells she is the snake's mother, and "dwells in the willow tree". She gives her daughter-in-law a golden "přeslíei" with silk on one end and pearl on the other, and a silver spindle, and tells her to barter the objects with the queen from the nearby village for a night with her husband. She girl follows her instructions and sells the first item, but she cannot wake the prince, and goes back to his mother. The second time, the lady in white gives the girl a basket of flowers with golden and silver stems and jeweled petals, and suggests her to weave flower wreaths to sell to the queen. The second attempt also fails. The third time, the lady in white gives the girl a blanket woven with golden thread and pearls, which she sells for a night with the prince. Finally, the girl wakes the prince. They pass by the willow tree to give their thanks, and return to their house.

== See also ==
Tales about serpent husbands:

- The Serpent Prince
- The Enchanted Snake
- The Green Serpent
- Tulisa, the Wood-Cutter's Daughter
- Khastakhumar and Bibinagar
- Habrmani
- King Lindworm
- Eglė the Queen of Serpents
- Princess Himal and Nagaray
- The Snake Prince
- Monyohe (Sotho)
- Umamba (Zulu folktale)
- Baemsillang (The Serpent Husband)
- Amewakahiko soshi
- Yasmin and the Serpent Prince
- Champavati
- The King of the Snakes
