= Václav Tille =

Czech writer (1867–1937)

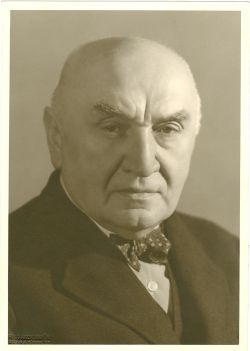

Václav Tille (16 February 1867 in Tábor – 26 June 1937 in Prague) was a Czech writer. He also used the pseudonym Václav Říha.
