= Nikolay Andreyev (folklorist) =

Nikolay Petrovich Andreyev (Russian: Николай Петрович Андреев) (1892– January 15, 1942) was a Soviet folklorist, literary scholar, professor at the Leningrad State Pedagogical Institute (now the Herzen University). He if known for the research and classification of Russian and Ukrainian folklore.

He died of hunger during the World War II Siege of Leningrad.

== Works ==
- 1929: Н.П. - Указатель сказочных сюжетов по системе Аарне.pdf Указатель сказочных сюжетов по системе Аарне] [Index of Fairy Tale Motifs According to the Aaarne System]
- 1934: К характеристике украинского сказочного материала
- 1936: Русская баллада
- 1936: Фольклор и его история

He also published several anthologies of Russian folklore.
