= Trandafiru =

Romanian fairy tale

Trandafiru (Note: "Trandafiru" means rose bush or flower) is a Romanian fairy tale collected by Arthur Carl Victor Schott and Albert Schott in the mid-19th century and sourced from Banat. It is related to the international cycle of the Animal as Bridegroom or The Search for the Lost Husband, albeit with a gourd instead of a snake as the form of the enchanted husband: a human maiden marries an animal that is a prince in disguise, breaks a taboo and loses him, and she has to seek him out.

The story shares motifs with other tales of the region, like Serbian Again, The Snake Bridegroom, and Hungarian The Serpent Prince: the heroine must search for her husband under a curse not to bear their child until he touches her again. Other Romanian tales of the same classification are The Enchanted Pig, wherein the animal husband is a pig, and Enchanted Balaur, wherein the animal husband is a snake.

== Summary ==
A man has a gourd for a son, who is a vegetable by day and man by night, named Trandafiru. One day, the gourd asks his parents to go and ask for the hand of the emperor's daughter. Worried about the reaction of the emperor when they see a pumpkin, the gourd son assuages their fears and becomes a man when night falls, so he can meet the princess. And so it happens: the emperor's daughter marries him and lives with him, despite him being a gourd by day and a man by night.

One day, the princess's mother visits her daughter and, despising the gourd as her son-in-law, convinces her to burn the gourd shape in the oven. The princess's mother-in-law asks her what is she doing with the oven, and she lies that she is preparing to make bread, then takes her husband's gourd shape and places it in the oven to burn it. Inside the oven, Trandafiru's voice curses his wife not to give birth to their child, until he lovingly embraces her again. The story then explains that, as the gourd burned, Trandafiru's soul was carried over by spirits to another kingdom, where he became their king.

Back to the princess, after grieving for some time, she puts an iron circle around her belly to endure the pains of the long pregnancy, then departs on her quest. Her first stop is the house of Holy Mother Wednesday, who, despite not knowing the location of Trandafiru, gives the princess a golden distaff and sends her to the house of Mother Holy Friday. Again, Holy Friday's help is of little use, but she gives the princess a golden reel to help in her quest. Lastly, the princess arrives at Holy Mother Sunday's house. Holy Mother Sunday tells the princess she is near her husband's location, and advises her to stand by the marble fountain with the golden gifts, one for each day, and draw the attention of the Empress (the false bride), then use the gifts to bribe the Empress for a night in the Emperor's (Trandafiru's) bedchamber. Before the princess goes to the fountain, Holy Mother Sunday gives her a golden hen with golden chicks.

Now knowing what to do, the princess goes to the fountain and uses the gifts to bribe the Empress for three nights with her husband. As for Trandafiru, he is put to sleep for two nights with a sleeping potion given by the Empress, so on the third night he pretends to be asleep to see who has come to his room for the past nights. Trandafiru awakes and embraces his wife, who is able to give birth to "two golden children". Trandafiru leaves the room to punish the Empress for her greed and love for gold, then crowns the princess his true empress.

== Analysis ==
=== Tale type ===
The tale is classified in the Aarne-Thompson-Uther Index as type ATU 425A, "The Animal (Monster) as Bridegroom". In this tale type, the princess burns the husband's animal skin and she must seek him out, even paying a visit to the Sun, the Moon and the Wind and gaining their help.

In tale type ATU 425A, the heroine journeys far and wide to encounter her husband, and finds him at the mercy of a second spouse. The supernatural husband, now human, is put to sleep by the magic potion of the second spouse, so that the heroine has no chance of rescuing him.

=== Motifs ===
Ethnologue Ovidiu Bîrlea noted that the enchanted husband in Romanian variants "usually" appears under a snakeskin or a pigskin, but can assume other forms in the texts, like a hedgehog, a crayfish, a frog and even a pumpkin.

==== The heroine's pregnancy ====
According to Romanian scholar Adolf Schullerus, one of the "characteristic features" of most of the Romanian variants is that, after the burning of his animal skin, the husband wraps hoops around the heroine's body and curses her not to bear their children until he places his arm around her body; after the curse is lifted, the heroine gives birth to a golden-haired son.

In addition, in Balkanic variants of the tale type, the supernatural husband curses his wife not to give birth to their child for a long period of time until she finds him again. Likewise, according to Lithuanian professor Bronislava Kerbelyte, similar tales from Hungary, Romania and Moldova contain the motif of the supernatural husband wrapping iron hoops around the heroine's belly so she cannot give birth to their child until he lays a hand on her again.

==== The heroine's journey ====
According to Hungarian folklorist Ágnes Kovács, Romanian tales of the "Snake Bridegroom" may show two versions (or redactions): either the mother-in-law burns the man's snakeskin, but he stays with his human bride, or the snakeskin is burnt and the husband disappears. The latter sequence prompts the husband's curse of the long pregnancy and the wife's quest for her husband.

In a study published posthumously, Romanian folklorist Petru Caraman noted that, in Romanian and in some South Slavic variants, instead of meeting the Sun, the Moon and the Wind on the way to her husband, the heroine finds incarnations of the days of the week, like Holy Wednesday (ro) and Holy Friday (ro). They function the same as the elements and gift the heroine with golden objects. French philologist Jean Boutière, in his doctoral thesis, analysed the variants available at the time and concluded that the heroine seeks the help of Holy Wednesday, Holy Friday and Holy Sunday (which are sometimes replaced by Holy Monday and Holy Saturday), and, rarely, of the Moon, the Sun and the Wind.

==== The gifts from the helpers ====
According to Hans-Jörg Uther, the main feature of tale type ATU 425A is "bribing the false bride for three nights with the husband". In fact, when he developed his revision of Aarne-Thompson's system, Uther remarked that an "essential" trait of the tale type ATU 425A was the "wife's quest and gifts" and "nights bought".

Jean Boutière also wrote that the heroine's three helpers (the days of the week) gift her with golden objects (one gift from each helper): a self-moving distaff, a self-moving reel and a hen with chicks - objects that, he noted, are "endowed with movement".

== Variants ==
=== Tales with pumpkin husband ===
==== The Enchanted Pumpkin ====
Romanian folklorist Lazar Saineanu provided the summary of a Romanian tale collected by Petre Ispirescu with the title Dovleacul cel năzdrăvan ("The Enchanted Pumpkin"). In this tale, a childless couple find a pumpkin seed and plant it. A pumpkin sprouts and they uproot it. The vegetable begins to speak to them and asks the old man to go to the local emperor and ask for the princess's hand in marriage. The emperor agrees to a future marriage, so long as the suitor builds three bridges: an iron one, a silver one and the third made of gold. The pumpkin son fulfills the emperor's requests and marries the princess. On the wedding night, the pumpkin takes off its husk and becomes a human youth. Later, the princess burns the pumpkin husk in the fire and her husband curses her not to give birth until he places his hand on her body, but she can only find him beyond Câmpu-frumosŭ, in the "Mânăstirea dintr'unŭ osŭ". He vanishes. The princess goes after him in iron shoes and with an iron cane, and passes by the houses of Sfinta Miercuri (Holy Wednesday), who gives her a self-moving golden spindle, Sfinta Vineri (Holy Friday), who gives her a golden hen with chicks, and Sfinta Duminecă (Holy Sunday), who gives her a self-serving table. Sfinta Duminecă also helps the princess to cross a fiery meadow, so she can reach the Mânăstirea dintr'unŭ osŭ, where she waits in front of the palace the golden objects. The princess trades the items she gained with the local lady of the palace for one night with her husband. She tries to wake him up on the first two nights, but fails, only managing to do it on the third night.

==== The Pumpkin (Vidin) ====
Sandu Timoc collected another tale from a teller in Vidin, with the title Dovletele ("The Pumpkin"). In this tale, a poor couple, in their twilight years, want to have a son, so the man decides to bring whatever they can find as their child. The man finds a pumpkin seed, brings it home and plants it. After some time, a pumpkin sprouts in their garden, and the man kicks it. The pumpkin tells the man not to kick it, but to take it home and raise it as their son. Some time later, the pumpkin tells his parents he wants to marry the emperor's daughter. The old man goes to the emperor and makes a bid in for his daughter in his son's stead, and the emperor orders him to build a bridge between both their houses, with golden and silver trees along the path, and ripe apples on them. The pumpkin son fulfills the first task. To buy time, the emperor next orders for a shining palace to be built that can rival his own, and for the old man's son to come in a gem-encrusted golden carriage with golden wheels, pulled by splendid horses with golden horsehoes and diamond bridle. All tasks fulfilled, the pumpkin son marries the princess. They move out to the pumpkin's palace and, after he enters the bridal chambers, the pumpkin son becomes a golden-haired youth. He tells his wife a witch cureed him to become a pumpkin by day and a man named Fat-Frumos at night. Later, the princess tells her mother about her husband. The empress suggests her daughter takes the pumpkin husk and burn it in the oven. The princess follows her mother's suggestion and places the pumpkin in the fire. As the husk burns, the husband tells her that his curse would have been over in nine days, and now he curses his wife not to give birth to their child until he touches her again. He vanishes. The princess puts a large iron ring around her belly and begins her quest. She passes by Sinta Vineri (Holy Friday), who gives her a golden hen with six chicks and directs her to Sinta Simbata (Holy Saturday). The princess goes to Sinta Simbata, who gives her a golden spindle and guides her to Sinta Duminica (Holy Sunday). At last, she reaches Sinta Duminica, who is grinding grains by a mill, and tells the princess her husband is living with a new spouse in a nearby village in the valley. Sinta Duminica advises the princess to go to the village well, where the princess goes to fetch water, and use the golden gifts to draw her attention. Following the advice, the princess uses the three golden gifts to bribe for three nights with her husband. On the third night, the princess awakens her husband and he touches her. The princess gives birth to their child. The husband regains his memories and tells the second spouse about the whole journey. The second spouse understands it and lets them live in the village.

=== Other tales ===
==== Fairy Prince ====
In a tale from teller Purdi Mihály, a Romanian in Hungary, published with the title Tündérkirályfi (Romanian: Făt-Frumos (cf. "Făt-Frumos"); English: "Fairy Prince"), a girl lives with her grandmother in the woods. One day, when she goes out to fetch some food for the pigs, she finds a hurt large bird. She wants to bring it home to be cooked, but the bird pleads to be spared and nursed back to health. The girl brings the bird home and looks after it. After two years, the bird is fully healed, and, suddenly, shakes off its feathers to become a prince. He introduces himself as Tündérkirályfi ('Fairy Prince'), who offers to be her husband. The girl agrees and they spend the night together. The next day, he turns back into a bird, then, at night, becomes human again, and warns the girl not to tell anyone about him. Some days later, the girl ends up telling her grandmother about the prince, and the old woman suggests that, instead of burning the featherskin (since the smell would alert him), she could give it to the pigs to eat. That night, the girl follows her grandmother's advice, steals the Fairy Prince's featherskin and feeds it to the pigs. The Fairy Prince wakes up and admonishes the girl's grandmother for interfering with their lives, curses the girl not to give birth until he places his hand on her again, and departs to the wide world. Time passes, and the girl laments that her husband has disappeared. One night, however, she has a dream about a golden-haired boy asking her about his father; the girl answers he vanished, and the boy says that his father, the Fairy Prince, is in the east, in his palace. The girl wakes up and decides to journey to the east, but the quest is not an easy one: she flees from some hungry wolves, is almost drowned and swallowed by a giant fish, is almost swept away by a whirlwind and wades through a large muddy pool. She is rescued by two men on camels, who help her out of the pool and kill two snakes that menace them. After the danger passes, the girl says she is looking for the Fairy Prince's palace in the east, and one of the men says that Mother Mercy can help her. The girl then continues until she finds an illuminated hut in forest. She spends the night and dines with Mother Mercy, who gives her a bundle of golden harl, and sends her to her aunt. On the way, the girl avoids a wild goat and reaches the house of Mother Charity, where she also dines. Mother Charity gives her a golden hen with chicks she is to let graze at the front of the Fairy Prince's palace, before directing her to an even older aunt, Mother Loyalty. The girl finally arrives at Mother Loyalty's house, dines with her at night, and is given three golden apples and a dog as her companion. The girl also learns that her husband has married a witch's daughter in the meantime. With the help of the dog, and after three years, the girl, heavily pregnant, reaches the Fairy Prince's palace. The story then changes perspective to narrate about the Fairy Prince's own journey: his sojourn in the land of the giants, where he works for a giant couple and their cowherd for years and is given a magic gray horse. He rides the horse to his palace, where he is greeted by a witch and her daughter, who trick him into believing he has no one from his previous life. Back to the present, the witch's servant sees the girl with a golden fuse spinning on golden thread, and reports to her mistress, the witch. The witch's daughter wants to have the golden item and barters for it, but the girl makes an offer: one night in the Fairy Prince's bedside. The girl cries over the Fairy Prince, but he cannot wake up, for he was given a sleeping potion by the witch. This happens again on the second night. On the third one, after she traded the golden apples for a night with him, the Fairy Prince wakes up and places his hand on his true wife's body, allowing her to give birth to their son, a three-year-old, golden-haired child. The next morning, the witches bring them some poisoned tea, but the Fairy Prince's son warns them against drinking it, so they should let the witches sip it first. Of course, the witches refuse to drink the poisoned tea; Fairy Prince discovers the ruse and orders their execution.

==== With Hat-Prince ====
In a Romanian tale published by Ovidiu Bîrlea with the title cu Hat-prinț, (Note: Ovidiu Bîrlea notes that many Romanian folk tales either have no established name or identified by the name of the protagonist, i.e., cu Hat-prinț means "[the story] with Hat-prinț".) an emperor has three daughters. One day, he has to go to another town and asks them what retuning gifts they would want: the elder two ask for boots and precious objects, and the youngest asks for a singing walnut leaf. The emperor finds presents for his elder two, but for his cadette. One day, a voice tells him he has the walnut leaf and makes a contract to give him the object, but in exchange for the first thing that greets him when he comes back home. The emperor agrees with the deal and returns home, with his cadette greeting him. The monarch delivers the walnut leaf and explains the situation to her. The princess puts on nice clothes and goes to meet her betrothed by going to a certain place. She is dragged underground by the Hat-prinț, who cannot be on the surface for ten years, otherwise the witches will capture him, and four years have passed so far. The princess lives with the mysterious Hat-prinț and bears him three children in the following three years. In the first year, she bears him a son and wishes to take the boy to visit her family, which is also having a wedding for her elder daughter. The princess goes to the wedding, but returns underground. Three years later, the princess goes for another visit, and her middle sister is getting married this time. The empress, her mother, questions her about living under the earth, but the princess says she lives in a furnished palace and has want of nothing, yet she has never seen her husband at night. The empress gives her some candles to see him at night and the princess returns home to the underground. At night, she takes out the candles and lights up her mysterious companion: a handsome prince, so beautiful to see she faints and drops some candlewax on his head. He wakes up with a start and admonishes his wife for her deed, then says she has to accompany him to the three edges of the world, where his sisters dwell, and leave one of their sons there. Hat-prinț takes his wife to visit her three sisters-in-law, where she is reprimanded for her actions and leaves a son with them. After the visits, Hat-Prinț waits for the princess to come back, when he spots a dark cloud coming for him. He curses his wife not to bear the child in her womb until he places a hand on her, then vanishes.

The princess goes on a long journey through deserts and wilderness in search of her husband, and passes by the houses of the Sfînta Lun'i (Holy Moon), where she gains a golden fork with golden spindle, the Sfînta Vineri (Holy Friday), who gives her a golden shawl, and the Sfînta Duminica (Holy Sunday). At Holy Sunday's hut, she summons every animal in the world to discern the location of Hat-prinț, but none knows of it, save for a latecomer lark. The lark has flown over Hat-prinț's new location, so Holy Sunday orders the bird to fly with the pregnant princess there and gives her a golden hen with four chicks. The lark carries the princess on an aerial journey to the kingdom of Hat-prinț and she takes out the golden objects to draw the attention of the maidservants that work for the local high empress. The princess makes a deal with the high empress: a golden object for the right of staying one night in the prince's quarters. A deal is made and the princess tries to wake Hat-prinț in the first two nights, begging him to touch her, to no avail. On the third day, a young male servant sees the princess take out the golden hen with chicks and goes to talk to Hat-prinț, who is on a hunt in the forest. The young servant alerts Hat-prinț of the pleading and crying woman that has come out at night to talk to him, and warns him to avoid eating and drinking anything, but to feign sleep. That same night, the high empress gives Hat-prinț his meal, but he says he will retire to his chambers. Soon, the princess, his true wife, appears to him and begs to be touched. He wakes up and places his hand on her, allowing her to give birth to male golden-haired twins. The high empress enters the room to take out the princess, but Hat-prinț orders her to be seized and burnt inside a barrel filled with tar. After releasing the servants from the palace, who were enslaved by the witches, Hat-prinț, his wife and their twins go back to his sisters-in-law's houses to retrieve their sons and the whole family returns to Hat-prinț's parents' kingdom, where he declares he is free of the curse and can live in the upper world again. According to Bîrlea, the tale was collected in Bucharest from an informant named Zlotar Gheorge, from Fundu Moldovei.

== Bibliography ==
- Caraman, Petru [in Romanian] (2009). Ion H. Ciubotaru; Ioana Repciuc (eds.). "Identificarea episodului despre Cupidon şi Psyche, din romanul "Metamorphoses" al lui Apuleius, cu un basm autentic popular" [Identification of the Episode on Cupidon and Psyche, in the Novel Metamorphoses by Appuleius, with An Authentic Folk Fairy Tale]. Anuarul Muzeului Etnografic al Moldovei (in Romanian) (9). Editura Palatul Culturii: 11–85.
