= Jean Boutière =

French philologist

Jean Boutière (1 November 1898 – 29 January 1967) was a French philologist and a specialist in Romance philology. He was born in Mallemort, Bouches-du-Rhône in France.

Jean Boutière was born 1 November 1898 in the area of the department Mallemort, Bouches-du-Rhône. After finishing high school in Marseille, he followed the faculty of letters to Aix and Toulouse, taking his license in philology in 1920. In the same year, Boutière became a professor at the French University Mission in Romania and taught the French language at Emanoil Gojdu University in Oradea, instead of Pascal Zigliara, who was transferred to Cluj. In Oradea, he kept busy taking school courses at a military administration school.

For two years, while he lived in Romania, he learned the Romanian language and made numerous trips to know the beauty of Romanian country, customs and traditions of the Romanian people. In 1924, urged by Mario Roques, professor at the Sorbonne, Jean Boutière choose his doctoral thesis the life and works of Ion Creangă, a Romanian novelist. To complete it, enter into a contract with the French teacher G. T. Kirileanu, Artur Gorovei, D. Furtună, Garabet Ibrăileanu, maintained a close correspondence, and they supplied many documents and testimonies about Ion Creangă.

Once completed the work, he defended his doctoral thesis at the Sorbonne on 24 May 1930.

The first major monograph about Ion Creangă was printed in Paris in 1930, having been well received not only in France but also in Romania, where, in 1932, in the report compiled by Mihail Sadoveanu, volume was crowned with the Romanian Academy Award.

Boutiére returned to France in 1922, and left to replace J. Linard at Oradea, while he functioned as a teacher at Coeneille in Rouen, then as the head of the department of the Romanian language at the National School of Oriental Languages, and finally as the successor of Mario Roques at the Sorbonne.

== Books ==
- La vie et l'oeuvre de Ion Creangă, Published by Librairie Universitaire J. Gamber Paris, 1930
- Viaţa şi opera lui Ion Creangă, Editura Junimea, Iaşi, 1976, în traducerea lui Constantin Ciopraga.
- It is nominated in the "Historical Collections of Libraries" of UNESCO in the Nouvelles roumaines – Anthologie des prosateurs roumains, 1962, preface by Tudor Vianu
