= Bronislava Kerbelytė =

Lithuanian folklorist (1935–2024)

Bronislava Kerbelytė (January 27, 1935 – November 5, 2024) was Lithuanian folklorist, professor.

== Biography ==
Bronislava Kerbelytė was born in Rečionys, then Žemaitkiemis valsčius, interbellum Lithuania. In 1958 she graduated from the Philological department of the Moscow State University. During 1958–2000 she worked at the Institute of Lithuanian Language and Literature of the Lithuanian Academy of Sciences (since 1990 in Institute of Lithuanian Literature and Folklore, an independent institute split off the ILLL). From 1995 she taught at the Vytautas Magnus University, Kaunas (professor since 1999). In 1988 she obtained her Ph.D. in philological sciences from the Gorky Institute of World Literature, USSR Academy of Sciences with the thesis Историческое развитие структур и семантики сказок : На материале литовских волшебных сказок (Historical development of the structures and semantics of fairy tales: Based on Lithuanian magical fairy tales).

All her scientific research was devoted to Lithuanian folklore. She systematized about 85,000 items of Lithuanian folklore (four volumes of Lietuvių pasakojamosios tautosakos katalogas, 1999–2009) and classified them according to the Aarne–Thompson–Uther Index (Lietuvių liaudies pasakų repertuaras, 2002), among other works.

Since 1989 she was the member of the International Society For Folk Narrative Research.

== Books ==
The complete (as of 2005) list of Kerbelytė's works was published in the Lithuanian Journal Tautosakos darbai (Folklore Studies). Of 287 works, 14 were scientific monographs on classification of Lithuanian mythology and folklore and folklore collections and 6 were popular science books.
