= Schalanggor (Monguor folktale) =

Schalanggor is a folktale from the Monguor people, a Mongolic people that live in China (Qinghai). In it, a father finds a flower from a youth's garden and is forced to give his youngest daughter to him in marriage - an event that is fortunate for the youngest daughter. Out of jealousy, the girl's sister conspires to take her place and kills her. The heroine, then, goes through a cycle of transformations, regains human form and takes revenge on her sister. The tale is related to the cycle of the animal bridegroom, but scholars consider it a narrative that developed in East Asia, since most of the tales are attested in China and Taiwan.

== Source ==
Folklorist Erika Taube translated the tale to German, which was first collected from a Monguor source in Qinghai, China.

== Summary ==
In this tale, an old man has three daughters. One day, his youngest daughter asks him to bring her a flower when he goes to cut firewood in the forest. The man cuts firewood and returns without the flower. His daughter reiterates her request, and gives him some buttered biscuits in order to remind him of the request. The next morning, the man tries to locate the flower, but cannot see anyone in the forest, until he finds a flower near a wall. He goes to cut with his axe, when the axe handle falls. He goes to look for the missing part and finds it inside a house that belongs to a man named Schalanggor. The man explains he lost his axe when he tried to cut a flower behind Schalanggor's house, and Schalanggor asks him why. The man explains the flower is for his daughter, and Schalanggor makes a deal: the axe handle and the flower in exchange for one of his daughters as his bride. The man returns home with the flower and gives it to his daughter, explaing the situation to the three girls. The elder two refuse to go with Schalanggor, save for the youngest. Schalanggor appears to take his bride, but the girl asks him to do some tasks first: first, to make a trail between both houses; next, to plant trees along the road and have birds singing on them; third, to spread brown and white felt between both houses. After Schalanggor performs each task, the girl goes with the man to his house. She wears fine clothes, while her husband sows the fields and herds the cattle. One day, the girl pays a visit to her family, and her elder sisters begin to feel envy, since their cadette is wearing fine clothes. One of the sisters asks their cadette to accompany her to the river to play: they throw their washing beatsticks, the elder's of wood and the youngest's of silver, and the youngest's sinks in the water. The elder sister shoves the youngest in the water, puts on her clothes, then runs back to Schalanggor's house to pretend she is his wife. The man notices her face is riddled with scars, the voice is not the same, and the woman lies that, while she was at her mother's house, the scars are from peas she put on her face and she sang so much her voice faltered. Schalanggor believes her story. The next morning, he goes to give water to his horse, when a seabird flies in next to the horse's mouth, and Schalanggor asks the bird to perch on his shoulder if he is someone that "belongs to him". The seabird perches on his shoulder and he brings it home to place inside a cage. The false wife dislikes the bird, kills it and buries it. From its grave, a thornbush sprouts, which tears the false wife's clothes. The woman burns the bush, and goes to draw water. The smoke from the burnt bush suddenly appears next to the sister's face and clouds her eyes, causing her to fall in the water. The smoke then materializes back into Schalanggor's true wife. She rejoins her husband and they live happily together.

== Analysis ==
=== Tale type ===
Taube classified the tale as Mongolian type ("Mongolische Märchentyp") MMT 152, and recognized that the story contained two "well-known" fairy tales: "Beauty and the Beast" (in regards to the youngest's present request for her father) and "The False Bride" (in regards to the heroine's elder sister shoving her in water and taking her place as the supernatural husband's wife).

==== Mongolian tale type MMT 152 ====
Hungarian orientalist László L. Lőrincz established the classification of the Mongolian tale corpus, published as Mongolische Märchentypus ("MMT"). In his system, in Mongolian tale type MMT 152, Die böse Schwester ("The Evil Sister"), a man goes to fetch flowers for his daughter in the forest, but loses his axe; a youth appears and gives him the axe and the flowers, in return for one of the man's daughters; the man's youngest daughter (the heroine) agrees to marry the youth, but demands some tasks first (e.g., building a bridge between their houses); after they marry, the heroine's elder sister drowns her and takes her place, but she survives and goes through a cycle of reincarnations, including a bird; the heroine is restored at the end of the tale. Lörincz compared the tale to parts of AT 425C, "Beauty and the Beast", and the final part of AT 403A, "The Black and White Bride".

==== Chinese tale type 433D ====
In the first catalogue of Chinese folktales, devised by folklorist Wolfram Eberhard in 1937, Eberhard abstracted a Chinese folktype he termed Der Schlangenmann ("The Serpent Husband"). In this type, indexed as number 31 in his catalogue, a man with many daughters marries his youngest daughter to a snake or snake spirit as a promise for a favour; the snake and the girl live happily, enticing the jealousy of the eldest sister; the eldest sister shoves the youngest sister into a well and takes her place; the youngest sister becomes a bird, then a tree (or bamboo), regains human form and unmasks her treacherous sister.

Chinese folklorist and scholar Ting Nai-tung established a second typological classification of Chinese folktales, and abstracted a similar narrative sequence. He named this tale type 433D, "The Snake Husband" (or "The Snake and Two Sisters").

In a joint article in Enzyklopädie des Märchens, European scholars Bengt Holbek and John Lindow described it as a "Chinese oikotype". In that regard, researcher Juwen Zhang indicated that type 433D, "Snake boy/husband and two sisters", is an example of local Chinese tale types that are not listed in the international ATU index.

=== Relation to other tale types ===
Ting described tale type 433D as a combination of the initial part of type 425C, "Beauty and the Beast", and the second part of type 408. Likewise, in the article about tale type King Lindworm in the Enzyklopädie des Märchens, Holbek and Lindow noted that Ting's new tale type combined motifs of ATU 425C, "Beauty and the Beast"; the heroine's transformation sequence that appears in tale type ATU 408, "The Love for Three Oranges", and the bird transformation from tale type ATU 720, "The Juniper Tree".

Taiwanese scholarship also recognizes some proximity between the Chinese tale type, the French story Beauty and the Beast (father plucks rose from the Beast and is forced to surrender him his daughter) and Italian The Three Oranges (heroine goes through cycle of transformations, including bird and tree), but emphasize that the European stories deal with love between heroine and hero, while the crux of the Chinese tale is the rivalry between a younger sister who married into good financial circumstances and her elder sister, wanting what the other has.

According to Christine Shojaei-Kawan's article, Walter Anderson, in his unpublished manuscript on The Three Oranges, identified a "Chinese mixed redaction" between the Snake Husband tale (which he listed as type AT 433A) and type 408, "The Three Oranges", in that the heroine is murdered and goes through a cycle of incarnations. However, Shojaei-Kawan considers that the motif of the transformation cycle already exists in South and East Asia unrelated to type 408, and suggests that the "mixed redaction" could be treated as an independent tale type.

=== Motifs ===
In his folktype system, Eberhard indicated that the number of sisters also varies between tales.

The heroine's father is ordered to surrender his daughter after he steals some of the snake's flowers from its garden, or asked to deliver her as the snake's reward for a favour (e.g., cutting all trees or retrieving his axe handle).

==== The snake husband ====
In his folktype system, Eberhard indicated that in some of the variants, the supernatural husband is a snake, snake spirit or a dragon, and another type of animal in others. He also agreed that the motif of the snake husband seemed very old.

In Ting's catalogue, the snake husband assumes human form, but it can also be a "flower god", a wolf, or a normal man.

==== The heroine's replacement ====
The heroine is drowned by her sister when she is convinced to bathe or to take a look at their reflections in water. In her cycle of transformations, she may change into many objects: a cradle, a baby carriage, a spindle, or a type of food (bread, or, as in Taiwanese variants, a red tortoise cake).

== Variants ==
=== Distribution ===
Eberhard, in his 1937 catalogue, asserted the tale's spread across China, but supposed that its center of diffusion was Southern China, since most of the variants available at the time were collected there. In a later work, Eberhard associated the tale of the snake husband with the local snake cults of the Yüeh culture. In turn, Ting, in his 1978 study, listed several printed variants of his type 433D, confirming the dispersal of the story in his country.

In addition, in a later study, Eberhard reported tales from Yunnan province and among the indigenous peoples of Taiwan. In this regard, according to researcher Juwen Zhang, the tale type is very popular in both China and Taiwan, with more than 200 variants collected. According to Li Shouhua, research of the "Snake Bridegroom" in China unearthed over 220 stories, distributed across 25 ethnic groups across 21 provinces and regions of mainland and Taiwan, including from the Han people and the Rukai people and Bunun people among the Gaoshan of Taiwan. Shouhua also concluded that the Chinese Snake Bridegroom tales, especially the story of Snake Bridegroom and Two Sisters, were "unique" to China, with a "clearly defined" geographical distribution.

=== Shilange ===
In a tale from the Monguor people collected in the Huzhu language with the title Shilange, a youth named Shilange lives in a cottage, behind where lies a wall of beautiful flowers. In the village, a man named Old Zhang lives with his three daughters, who ask him to pluck some of the flowers behind Shilange's cottage. Old Zhang goes with an ax to cut some flowers, but he slips and his ax falls into Shilange's yard. Shilange wakes up, goes to the yard and returns the ax to Old Zhang, and asks something in return. Old Zhang offers in jest to be Shilange's matchmaker, and the youth replies he wants to marry one of the man's daughters. Old Zhang agrees, but advises that Shilange is to let go of his lazy ways. Old Man Zhang returns home and tells his daughters about it. The elder two, named Eldest Sister and Second Sister, refuse to marry Shilange due to his laziness, but Third Sister, the youngest, agrees. As the wedding date approaches, her father worries about finding good wedding garments for her, but his family is very poor. One day, Old Man Zhang sees a swarm of bees sewing garments to Third Sister. Shilange marries Third Sister, he works on improving his lazy ways and becomes a diligent man. Theirs is a happy marriage, which stirs the jealousy of Eldest Sister. One day, Eldest Sister convinces Third Sister to go to the river and wash some clothes. She suggests swapping clothes with her sister, shoves the girl in the river and, posing as her, returns to Shilange's house. Shilange notices the different physical traits of his wife, but she dismisses Shilange's suspicions with a false story: the false bride has a darker face, which she attributes to the hot sun on her skin; she has pockmarks, which she blames on some windblown sand; she has short yellow hair, which she pins on the sun's heat on her hair. Some time later, Shilange rides his horse near the river and a colored bird perches on his sleeve. Shilange brings it home; the bird chirps to him whenever he passes and craps on the false wife. The Eldest Sister kills the bird and buries it in the yard, and a thorny bush sprouts that scratches the false wife. Eldest Sister burns the bush in the cooking stove. An old pig-herding woman goes to Shilange's house and asks for some coals. The old woman gets some coals and finds a spinning wheel she takes home. The pig-herding woman notices that, whenever she leaves home and returns, the house is clean and the food prepared. She discovers that a girl, Third Sister, comes out of the spinning wheel and adopts her as a daughter. One day, Third Sister convinces the old woman to invite Shilange and his "wife" to their house, but Eldest Sister, posing as Shilange's wife, orders the old woman to roll out red and white carpets between both houses, then to plant large trees, and perch birds in every tree. Due to Third Sister's advice, the old woman fulfills the conditions and the couple goes to the woman's house. After eating some of the food, Shilange finds a lock of glossy black hair and a golden ring in the bottom of his bowl, while Eldest Sister eats some pig excrement, vomits it up and returns home. Shilange learns that his true wife, Third Sister, is alive, who was adopted by the old woman. He goes back home to punish the false wife and welcomes Third Sister and the old woman into his house. The tale was collected from a 70-year-old teller named Yang Fujie, from Datong County.

=== Shalangguer’s Story ===
In a Mangghuer tale titled Shalangguerni Bihuang, translated as Shalangguer’s Story, collected from teller Lü Jinliang, an old man has two daughters who ask him every day to bring them flowers, but he questions where he could find some. One day, he sights some flowers at the back of Shalangguer's house. He goes to chop the flowers for his daughters, and before the third hit, the axe-head falls into Shalangguer's garden. The man calls out for Shalangguer to bring back his axe, and Shalangguer says he is putting on his socks and shoes, goes to eat first, then goes to meet the old man. Shalangguer asks the man which daughter he can get to marry as his bride, and the old man offers him whoever Shalangguer desires. Shalangguer then returns the axe-head, and sends Bumblebee as matchmaker to his intended bride. Bumblebee takes two chi of cloth under his arms and goes to the old man's house. The old man does not welcome him, but his younger daughter, Younger Daughter, accompanies Bumblebee back to Shalangguer's house. She finds out that her intended bridegroom's family is rich, and she has "a good destiny". Sometime later, Younger Sister pays her family a visit. Her elder sister, Elder Sister, asks her to come wash clothes in the Yellow River with their tubs. Elder Sister takes her wooden tub and Younger Sister her metal one. The elder sister tricks her cadette to spin and sink her metal tub in the river, then asks the other to try and fetch it. As Younger Sister is distracted, Elder Sister drowns her in water, then returns to Shalangguer's house and pretends to be his wife. Shalangguer notices the other does not look like his true wife due to her small feet and absence of pockmarks on her face; Elder Sister lies that some stones bruised her feet and sand and stone from the beach scratched her face. Later, Shalangguer goes to give water to the horse, when a bird squawks, cursing that his horse will not drink water. The bird's words cause the horse not to drink water for some days, and Shalangguer confronts the animal, asking it to perch on his left shoulder if it is his former wife and on his right shoulder if it is his current one. The bird lands on Shalangguer's left shoulder. Shalangguer concludes that someone shoved his wife in water, takes the bird home and places it on the upper part of the gate frame. The bird defecates on Elder Sister when she passes under the animal. Enraged, she strangles the bird and buries it. A thorny bush sprouts and scratches at her clothes. For this annoyance, the false wife burns the bush, but it turns into an erqighe, a stone tied to a short stick used to twist wool. One day, an old female pig-herder goes to Elder Sister's stove to light a cigarette, finds the erqighe and takes it home with her. The old woman presents the object to her kitchen goddess, the erqighe turns into a girl who prepares meals for the old lady. The tale ends.

== See also ==
- King Lindworm (ATU 433B)
- The Girl With Two Husbands (ATU 433B)
- The Dragon-Prince and the Stepmother (ATU 433B)
- Champavati (AaTh 433C)
- The Story of the Hamadryad (AaTh 433C)
- The Origin of the Sirenia (AaTh 433C)
- Animal as Bridegroom
- The Story of Tam and Cam
- Beauty and Pock Face
- The Boys with the Golden Stars
- The Snake Lord
- Sandrembi and Chaisra
- Princess Baleng and the Snake King
- The Younger Sister Marries the Snake
- The King of the Snakes
- King Iguana (Indonesian folktale)
