= The Story of Tấm and Cám =

Vietnamese fairy tale

The Story of Tấm and Cám (Vietnamese: Truyện Tấm Cám) commonly known as Tấm Cám ( chữ Nôm: 𥹀𥽇) is an ancient Vietnamese fairy tale. The first part of the tale's plot is very similar to the European folk tale Cinderella.

== Plot ==
=== Tấm's life before she marries the sovereign ===
The story is about two half-sisters; the eldest is named Tấm (broken rice) and the youngest is named Cám (rice bran). Tấm's mother dies early and her father remarries before dying soon after. Tấm lives with her stepmother, who is Cám's mother. The stepmother is very sadistic and makes Tấm do all the housework, whereas Cám does not have to do anything.

One day, the stepmother tells Tấm and Cám to go to the field to catch "tép" (caridina, a tropical genus of shrimp) and promises to give them a new red yếm (a Vietnamese traditional bodice) to whoever catches the most. Tấm soon fills up her basket, while Cám plays in the water and catches nothing. Realizing that her sister actually had a chance at receiving a red yếm and the day is almost done, Cám comes up with a plan to sabotage Tấm's work. Cám tells her older sister to wash her hair, saying that the stepmother will scold her if her hair is so muddy after catching all the caridinas, and Tấm obeys. While Tấm is washing her hair, Cám transfers all the shrimp from Tấm's basket to hers and goes home.

When Tấm realizes that all the shrimp she has caught is gone, she cries in seeing all her hard work disappear and the impending punishment that will come from her stepmother. Bụt (the Vietnamese equivalent to a fairy godmother, sometimes considered a tiên) appears and asks why she cries, and she tells him what happened. He tells her to stop crying and see what is left in the basket, which is merely a goby. Then he tells her to raise the fish in a well with her rice and teach her the words to call the fish up:

O goby, o goby

Go up and eat my golden and silver rice

Don't eat those spoiled rice and porridge of theirs.

(Original:

Bống bống bang bang

Lên ăn cơm vàng cơm bạc nhà ta

Chớ ăn cơm hẩm cháo hoa nhà người.)

Without the exact recitement, the goby would not rise, according to what Bụt has said before he vanishes. Tấm follows his counsel, and the goby grows noticeably. Tấm would spend her time talking to the goby about her thoughts, which the fish would silently comfort her. Suspicious about her behavior, the stepmother and the half-sister discover the fish as well as the poem by which Tấm summons it. The stepmother plans to distance Tấm in order to kill the fish:

"My daughter, the village has prohibited using the field; tomorrow you should graze our buffaloes far away, or they shall seize them."

The stepmother also tells Tấm to leave her coat behind. Tấm obeys her stepmother, unaware of her intent. The stepmother has Cám wear Tấm's clothes and recite the line, making the goby mistaken her as Tấm, which allows them to butcher the goby.

After coming back home, Tấm calls the goby up as usual, but nothing goes up but blood. She sobs again and the Bụt appears again. He asks why she cries and she explains. He replies: "Your goby they have eaten. Cry no more! Collect its bones, put them in four jars and bury them under your bed legs", and she does so.

Soon after, the sovereign hosts a festival, which he invites people from everywhere to attend, including Tấm and her family. Noticing that Tấm also wants to join, the stepmother mixes up the rice and bran that Tấm has to separate them before joining the festival, and threatens to punish her if she does not have it done by the time they get back from the festival. Again she cries, but then Bụt reappears and she explains what happened. He calls sparrows down to help her and teaches her a poem to prevent them from eating the bran and rice:

O sparrows, go down and separate these grains of rice for me

Eat a grain, and I will beat you to death

(Original:

Rặt rặt xuống nhặt cho tao

Ăn mất hạt nào thì tao đánh chết)

Bụt then tells her to dig up those jars that she had buried previously. The first two jars includes silk clothes, a scarf, and a red yếm. The third jar contains a tiny horse which enlarges into a normal horse; the fourth has a saddle for the horse.

Happily, Tấm washes up and wears the clothing before rushing to the festival in the capital. Crossing a stone bridge, she drops a slipper and cannot get it back. When the sovereign crosses the same bridge, the elephant on which the sovereign rides suddenly growls and brushes its ivory down to the earth. Curiously, the sovereign commands his men to look underwater, and they find the slipper. He observes the slipper for a while and comments that the shoe must belong to a gracious woman. Saying so, he tells all the women in the festival to try the slipper to find out the owner, whom he shall wed. No one fits the shoe. Tấm arrives, excited about the festivities and notices her slipper on display. She approaches to try it on. Seeing Tấm trying it on, Cám and her mother mock her. The slipper turns out to fit her, and she draws the other one to wear. The sovereign commands his people to lead her to his palace to wed her. Tấm goes with the sovereign in front of Cám's and her mother's envious eyes.

=== Tấm's Reincarnations ===
Tấm and the sovereign are happily married. Not forgetting her father's death day, despite the fulfilling life in the sovereign's palace, she comes back home to help her stepmother prepare for the anniversary.

All the hatred the stepmother and Cám have towards Tấm rises again, but they kept their thoughts private. Despite their harsh treatment towards her before she was married, Tấm treats them kindly during the anniversary.

The stepmother tells Tấm to climb on an areca tree to gather its fruit for the ceremony. While Tấm is doing so, the stepmother chops down the tree, causing Tấm to fall down and die.

The stepmother takes Tấm's clothes for Cám to wear. Cám goes to the sovereign's palace and lies to him that Tấm had unfortunately drowned in a pond by accident. Cám states she came to the palace to replace her sister's position as his wife. The sovereign is saddened to hear so, but with no other choice he marries Cám. He ignores his new wife, mourning for Tấm silently, to the other's dismay.

Tấm reincarnates into an oriole. She flies straight to the sovereign. On her way, she scolds Cám for not properly washing the sovereign's clothes. Eventually, Tấm sees the sovereign, and she sings to him.

Missing his wife, the sovereign says: "O oriole, if you are my wife, enter my sleeve", and she does so. The sovereign immediately believes that she has been reincarnated as the bird and only spends his time with it, ignoring Cám even more. He then builds a cage for Tấm to reside in when they are not together.

Following her mother's counsel, Cám butchers the oriole, eats it, and then buries its feather in the royal garden. She lies to the sovereign that she was not aware of the interaction between him and the bird, and the oriole simply flew away when she tried to feed it.

From where the feathers were buried grow two peach trees. The trees bend itself to provide shade for the sovereign. Noticing the two trees that somehow appeared in the royal garden, the sovereign believes they are also a sign from Tấm.

The sovereign tells his people to bring a cot so he can nap there every day. Cám chops the trees down and tells the sovereign she did so to weave new clothes for him. While weaving the clothes, she hears Tấm accusing her for stealing her husband, cursing her and threatening to "hack her eyes". She then burns the loom and throw the ash far away from the palace. The wind carries the ashes far away before they eventually land. From the ash grows a golden apple tree.

A crone soon crosses by the tree and is enticed by the scent of its only fruit. The old woman says:

O golden Apple, fall to my basket

Your scent I'll smell, eat you I’ll not

(Original: "Thị ơi thị à, rụng vào bị bà, bà để bà ngửi chứ bà không ăn." or "Thị ơi thị rơi bị bà, bà để bà ngửi chứ bà không ăn").

The crone keeps her word and places it in her house as if it were a house decor. She soon notices that the housework was finished, and a meal was prepared for her as well. The next day she pretends to leave, and finds a woman, Tấm, appear from the apple. The crone then tears off the peel of the fruit when Tấm exits the apple, and she makes Tấm her adopted daughter.

One day, the sovereign comes across the crone's house and stops to rest. She offers the sovereign betel leaf. It was prepared the same style Tấm did when she was alive, so the sovereign suspects. He asks who made it; the old woman tells him that her daughter did. The sovereign demands to see the "daughter" and Tấm appears. The sovereign gladly brings Tấm back to the palace.

=== Revenge ===
Later, when Tấm has returned to the palace, Cám asks Tấm about her beauty secret. Tấm does not answer, but instead asks back: "Do you want to be beautiful? I'll help you!"

Cám immediately agrees. Tấm tells her to jump down a hole and she does so. Tấm then commands the royal soldiers to pour boiling water onto her, killing Cám and using her corpse to make a fermented sauce (in the same way fish sauce is made). Tấm then sends the sauce to her stepmother, saying it is a gift from Cám.

The stepmother believes so and eats it every day. One day, a crow flies by the stepmother's house and rests on her roof and cries out:

"Delicious! The mother is eating her own daughter's flesh! Is there any left? Give me some."

(Original: "Ngon ngỏn ngòn ngon! Mẹ ăn thịt con, có còn xin miếng.")

The stepmother becomes angry, but, when she finally reaches the bottom of the jar, she discovers a skull inside. Realizing it is Cám's, the stepmother immediately dies of shock.

== Variations ==
Variations of the story exist but still maintain the main points. For instance, in variants from the Kinh people, stories from the northern part differ from tales collected in the southern part, wherein the heroine is called Cam.

Some versions of the story implies that Cám is also involved in abusing Tấm while others suggest that Cám is indifferent about her mother's abusive nature towards her half-sister.

There are also some versions where the step-mother and Cám are eating the goby when Tấm arrives home and the two laugh when Tấm's realizes who they were eating.

Other versions have the Bụt tell Tấm that she must return her silk clothes, shoes and horse once she returns home, so that her goby will come back to life. At the festival, her stepmother and Cám notice her and Tấm immediately flees in fear. She quickly rides back home, losing her slipper in the process. Upon returning home and changing back into her normal clothes, she discovers that one of her slippers is missing and begins to mourn for the loss of her friend. She walks outside and cries herself to exhaustion, clinging onto a nearby tree. Her stepmother and Cám make it back home to see her sleeping next to the tree. Thinking that she simply fell asleep from exhaustion and assured that they actually didn't see Tấm at the festival, the two returned to the festivities. The sovereign and his court were on the way to the festival when he discovers the shoe. Variations that have this change will have the sovereign set up a place to display the missing shoe for all the maidens in the country to try on, and ordered the guards to notify him of anyone who can fit it. Eventually, the sovereign grows impatient about the search and he himself joins the guards on watch. Tấm, believing that the shoe is the one she was missing, sneaks into the night and takes the shoe away so that she can compare it to the one she has in her possession at home. The guards, who were watching the shoe with the sovereign at the time, initially wanted to arrest her for theft, but the sovereign caught a glimpse of her face and immediately fell in love with her beauty. He commands his guard to silently follow Tấm home with him to see what she is doing with the shoe. As Tấm was able to confirm that the shoe she took was her missing pair, the sovereign finally made himself known by entering her home. Despite being in his presence and the stepmother and Cám beginning to scold the girl for causing enough trouble to bring guards, the sovereign speaks gently to Tấm and explains why he is at her home. He becomes enamored as he realizes that she is more beautiful up close. Tấm too is enamored by the sovereign and his gentleness. She then reveals the shoe she took and the pair she had, trying both on, and proves that she is the true owner of the slipper.

In some versions of the death anniversary, the stepmother and Cám tell Tấm that they are unable to get the palm fruit; the stepmother claims she is too old and Cám is not able to climb well. Tấm volunteers to gather the fruits for them. Some versions have both the stepmother and Cám arrive at the palace after her death, explaining to the sovereign that Tấm suggested the idea of her half-sister marrying him before she died.

One variation has the crone live in the royal palace with Tấm and becomes respected as Tấm's own mother.

For revenge, in some versions, Tấm tells her sister to bathe in boiling water, and Cám's vanity blinds her from reason.

In some variations, the stepmother and Cám died out of anger when Tấm comes back instead the stepmother eating Cám's remains. Some children-friendly versions of the story omit the revenge from the story or even end the story at Tấm marrying the sovereign.

Variants also exist among the Thai, Meo, Tay, Cham and Khmer groups in Vietnam.

== Analysis ==
=== Tale type ===
The story's plot is very similar to the typical plot of many Cinderella variations. Up until Tấm marries the sovereign, the story coincides with Cinderella's plot. Examples include both of them being mistreated by stepmothers, prohibited from going to a festival/party/ball with their stepmothers forcing them to separate grains, and recognized by the sovereign/prince by their lost shoe. The use of transformation and reincarnation are also shown in other fairy tales such as "The Juniper Tree".

Unlike some versions of Cinderella, Cám is never implied to be ugly. Cám is either portrayed as beautiful like her sister, though lacking in qualities like grace and being hardworking, or simply plainer than Tấm.

According to Sinologist Boris L. Riftin, unlike European variants of Cinderella, wherein the princess marries the prince and the tale ends, Asian variants (which include those from China and Southeast Asia) segue into the revenge of the stepfamily and the heroine's replacement by her stepsister. In the second part of the story, states Ding Naitong, the heroine goes through a cycle of transformations (bird/tree/object), until she regains human form at an old woman's house.

Vietnamese folklorist Nguyễn Đổng Chi agreed that Tam Cam was a variant of the Cinderella story, but considered it a local variation that could be divided in three parts:

1. The stepmother-stepdaughter conflict and the presence of the goby fish and the shoe;
2. Tam's cycle of reincarnations, including a bird (oriole) and a tree (persimmon tree);
3. Tam's vengeance and punishment of her stepfamily by the cooking of Cam's flesh.

=== Motifs ===
In the southeastern and Chinese versions of this type of story, the heroine's mother is reborn in the shape of a water animal: in the tales of the Viet, Cham, and Thai people it is almost always a fish (or shrimp), but in Han texts she turns into a bovine animal, like a cow or a buffalo. In the same vein, Vietnamese folklorist Nguyễn Đổng Chi noted that the heroine's mother also dies and goes through a cycle of incarnations, which vary depending on the tale. It can be a fairy, a turtle, a goldfish, a tigress or a cow.

== In popular culture ==
Many Vietnamese YouTubers or advertisers reference or create parodies of the fairytale. A movie adaptation of the story named Tam Cam: The Untold Story was produced by Ngô Thanh Vân and released in Vietnam on 19 August 2016. The movie's theme song, "Bống bống bang bang" also amassed hundreds of millions views on Youtube.

The story of Tấm Cám is among the fairy tales retold in the graphic novel The Magic Fish by Vietnamese-American author and illustrator Trung Le Nguyen.

== See also ==
- Kongjwi and Patjwi
- Bawang Merah Bawang Putih
- Beauty and Pock Face
- Cinderella
- Sweetheart Roland
- The Boys with the Golden Stars
- The Juniper Tree
- Ye Xian
- The King of the Snakes
- The Younger Sister Marries the Snake
- Schalanggor
