= The King of the Snakes =

Chinese folktale about a snake husband

The King of the Snakes is a Chinese folktale published by John Macgowan in 1910. In it, a father finds a flower from a snake spirit's garden and is forced to give his youngest daughter to the animal, who turns out to be a human, and their marriage is fortunate for the youngest daughter. Out of jealousy, the girl's sister conspires to take her place and kills her. The heroine, then, goes through a cycle of transformations, regains human form and takes revenge on her sister.

The tale is related to the cycle of the animal bridegroom, but scholars consider it a narrative that developed in East Asia, since most of the tales are attested in China and Taiwan. Local and regional folktale indexes register similar tales from nearby regions in East Asia, such as in Mongolia and Japan.

== Summary ==
The tale begins by describing how a society of snakes is so refined and advanced that some of its members are dissatisfied with their low condition and wish to become humans. One of them, who becomes the ruler of the snakes, discovers how to alternate between human and snake forms, becomes human and owns a great estate in the human realm. On this estate, there is a beautiful garden unlike any other in the Flowery Kingdom.

One day, this Prince of Snakes sees an old man plucking flowers in his own gardens and, irritated, asks the old man the reason for his presence. The old man answers he is just plucking flowers for his four daughters, of varying charm and beauty: the eldest pock-faced and the fourth the most beautiful. He ponders on this information and demands the old man send the fourth daughter to him as his bride in ten days time, lest he send a troop of snakes to devour him and his family.

The man returns home and tells the situation to his daughters. The three elders refuse to marry the snake, despite his threat, but the youngest, Almond Blossom, being the "most devotedly filial", offers to go in her father's place. The fairies listen to her plea and, touched by her devotion, send one of their own to protect her against her enemies.

At the appointed time, a sedan-chair comes to their house to get Almond Blossom as the snake's bride and to take her to her future husband. The father follows behind his daughter some days later and reaches the snake's palace. He is greeted by his daughter, who looks very pleased with her new life: a loving husband and a lavish palace. She tells her father her husband is on a journey and sends him back to his humble house with extravagant gifts.

After the father returns home, he shows the grand presents to his daughters. The eldest begins to nurture a jealous heart and decides to visit her sister. She goes and admires the whole palace. She convinces Almond Blossom to show her around the property. They reach an empty well. The eldest sister shoves her in.

After some time, the eldest sister still at the snake king's palace, a little bird flies out of the well and begins to sing a song with almost human-like qualities. The eldest sister, fearing that the bird will reveal the truth, snap its neck and throws it outside the house. Some time later, a clump of bamboo grow up on the spot of the bird's remains. The eldest sister, sensing that the bamboo will also reveal the truth, gets an axe and chops them down.

Some of the snake king's servants see the chopped down bamboo and take some of them to fashion a new chair. The Snake King finally returns home and asks about his wife. The eldest sister says only that she saw her by the well, and the servants also do not know her whereabouts. Suddenly, the chair turns into Almond Blossom, who accuses her sister of trying to kill her. Enraged, the snake king orders the execution of his sister-in-law.

== Analysis ==
=== Tale type ===
In the first catalogue of Chinese folktales, devised by folklorist Wolfram Eberhard in 1937, Eberhard abstracted a Chinese folktype he termed Der Schlangenmann ("The Serpent Husband"). In this type, indexed as number 31 in his catalogue, a man with many daughters marries his youngest daughter to a snake or snake spirit as a promise for a favour; the snake and the girl live happily, enticing the jealousy of the eldest sister; the eldest sister shoves the youngest sister into a well and takes her place; the youngest sister becomes a bird, then a tree (or bamboo), regains human form and unmasks her treacherous sister.

Chinese folklorist and scholar Ting Nai-tung established a second typological classification of Chinese folktales, and abstracted a similar narrative sequence. He named this tale type 433D, "The Snake Husband" (or "The Snake and Two Sisters").

In a joint article in Enzyklopädie des Märchens, European scholars Bengt Holbek and John Lindow described it as a "Chinese oikotype". In that regard, researcher Juwen Zhang indicated that type 433D, "Snake boy/husband and two sisters", is an example of local Chinese tale types that are not listed in the international ATU index.

=== Relation to other tale types ===
Ting described tale type 433D as a combination of the initial part of type 425C, "Beauty and the Beast", and the second part of type 408. Likewise, in the article about tale type King Lindworm in the Enzyklopädie des Märchens, Holbek and Lindow noted that Ting's new tale type combined motifs of ATU 425C, "Beauty and the Beast"; the heroine's transformation sequence that appears in tale type ATU 408, "The Love for Three Oranges", and the bird transformation from tale type ATU 720, "The Juniper Tree".

Taiwanese scholarship also recognizes some proximity between the Chinese tale type, the French story Beauty and the Beast (father plucks rose from the Beast and is forced to surrender him his daughter) and Italian The Three Oranges (heroine goes through cycle of transformations, including bird and tree), but emphasize that the European stories deal with love between heroine and hero, while the crux of the Chinese tale is the rivalry between a younger sister who married into good financial circumstances and her elder sister, wanting what the other has.

According to Christine Shojaei-Kawan's article, Walter Anderson, in his unpublished manuscript on The Three Oranges, identified a "Chinese mixed redaction" between the Snake Husband tale (which he listed as type AT 433A) and type 408, "The Three Oranges", in that the heroine is murdered and goes through a cycle of incarnations. However, Shojaei-Kawan considers that the motif of the transformation cycle already exists in South and East Asia unrelated to type 408, and suggests that the "mixed redaction" could be treated as an independent tale type.

=== Motifs ===
In his folktype system, Eberhard indicated that the number of sisters also varies between tales.

The heroine's father is ordered to surrender his daughter after he steals some of the snake's flowers from its garden, or asked to deliver her as the snake's reward for a favour (e.g., cutting all trees or retrieving his axe handle).

==== The snake husband ====
In his folktype system, Eberhard indicated that in some of the variants, the supernatural husband is a snake, snake spirit or a dragon, and another type of animal in others. He also agreed that the motif of the snake husband seemed very old.

In Ting's catalogue, the snake husband assumes human form, but it can also be a "flower god", a wolf, or a normal man.

==== The heroine's replacement ====
The heroine is drowned by her sister when she is convinced to bathe or to take a look at their reflections in water. In her cycle of transformations, she may change into many objects: a cradle, a baby carriage, a spindle, or a type of food (bread, or, as in Taiwanese variants, a red tortoise cake).

== Variants ==
=== Distribution ===
Eberhard, in his 1937 catalogue, asserted the tale's spread across China, but supposed that its center of diffusion was Southern China, since most of the variants available at the time were collected there. In a later work, Eberhard associated the tale of the snake husband with the local snake cults of the Yüeh culture. In turn, Ting, in his 1978 study, listed several printed variants of his type 433D, confirming the dispersal of the story in his country.

In addition, in a later study, Eberhard reported tales from Yunnan province and among the indigenous peoples of Taiwan. In this regard, according to researcher Juwen Zhang, the tale type is very popular in both China and Taiwan, with more than 200 variants collected. According to Li Shouhua, research of the "Snake Bridegroom" in China unearthed over 220 stories, distributed across 25 ethnic groups across 21 provinces and regions of mainland and Taiwan, including from the Han people and the Rukai people and Bunun people among the Gaoshan of Taiwan. Shouhua also concluded that the Chinese Snake Bridegroom tales, especially the story of Snake Bridegroom and Two Sisters, were "unique" to China, with a "clearly defined" geographical distribution.

=== China ===
Among Chinese variants, there is the tale The Story of the Cucumber Snake.

==== Regional tales ====
===== The Snake Husband =====
In a Chinese tale titled The Snake Husband (Chinese: She lang), an old woodcutter goes to pluck flowers for his three daughters in a garden that belongs to a snake. However, the snake (who appears as a human male) stops his actions and demands one of his daughters in marriage. The woodcutter's two elder daughters refuse, while the youngest agrees to marry the snake man, and lives in happiness, splendour and luxury. The eldest sister learns of her younger sister's good fortune, shoves her into a well and passes herself off as the snake man's true wife. As for her sister, she becomes a pretty little bird whose chirping mocks the evil sister and perches on the snake man's arm. The jealous sister kills the bird and buries it in the garden. From its grave a date tree sprouts, giving sweet fruits to the snake man and bitter ones for the false wife, who chops it down to make a threshold. After she places the threshold, she trips on it and decides to burn it, but a spark falls into her eyes and blinds her. At the end, the true wife is revived and the false wife punished. In another version of the popular The Snake Husband tale, the third daughter offers herself in her father's place when he came to pick a rose. In this regard, scholars Rostislav Berezkin and Sinologist Boris L. Riftin suggested that the sequence with the rose is "Indian in origin", since the rose does not appear in Chinese folklore. Also, they compared the tale to Russian The Crimson Flower and European Beauty and the Beast, both classified as tale types ATU 425C.

===== The Snake Bridegroom =====
Researcher Juwen Zhang published a tale titled The Snake Bridegroom: an old man has two daughters, the elder ugly and lazy, and the younger beautiful and dutiful. The man goes to chop wood in the mountains and, one day, sees a cowherd cracking a whip to herd the cows and singing a song about a love interest with shining hair and dainty feet. One day, the man is sharpening an ax, and his elder daughter asks him to get some flowers from the mountain. Suddenly, the old man sing the cowherd's song, and the elder daughter answers with a song that her hair is not shining and her feet are large. The younger daughter makes the same request and, hearing the song, sings her own verses in response to the song. Suddenly, a loud noise of trumpets and a march comes from outside the house. The three leave to see the commotion, and the father notices the person ahead of the retinue is the same cowherd. The youth replies that his younger daughter replied to his song and he has come to make her his bride. The cowherd promises to treat her well and tells the old man to follow the buckwheat flowers when they are in bloom to visit his daughter. Time passes, and the old man does as instructed; he arrives at a stone slab and waits for his daughter and her husband. The couple comes, opens the stone slab and bids him follow them. They climb down several steps to a large and spacious house. The old man notices his daughter has a good material life, and she explains her husband is the Golden Cow Star (The Taurus) in the Heavens. The cowherd husband lets his wife visit her elder sisters and gifts his father-in-law with silver and gold to bring home. The old man returns home with the gifts and his younger daughter, and the eldest sister, seeing the riches they brought, regrets not marrying the cowherd and plans to replace her. Goaded by her elder sister, the younger one teaches her the secret spell to open up the stone slab. After ten days, the elder sister offers to escort the younger back home, and puts her plans into action: on the road, the elder asks the younger to try her beautiful clothes, and shoves the younger down a well. The elder opens the stone slab and tries to pass herself off as the cowherd's wife. The cowherd suspects something is amiss, but does not have time to dwell on his thoughts, for he has to herd the cows. A little bird perches on his arm, and sings about being the true wife. The cowherd decides to spy on the sister-in-law's behaviour: she kills the little bird after it mocks a pancake she was preparing, and the cowherd buries it. On the bird's grave, a jujube tree sprouts, it feeds the cowherd dates and tosses centipedes to her sister, who, enraged, chops down the tree and burns it. The cowherd gathers the ashes and places them in a bag. The ugly sister notices her clothes are dirty and goes to river to wash them, but falls in water and drowns. Meanwhile, the cowherd mourns for his lost wife, and, after 49 days, finds out she is back to life.

===== The Snake and Three Sisters =====
In another tale collected by Zhang with the title The Snake and Three Sisters, an old couple live at the foot of Long White Mountains with their three beautiful daughters. The old man hunts in the mountains to provide food for his family, but one days falls ill, to the three daughters' worries. The three daughters suggests they learn to hunt, and, after their father recovers, he takes them to the mountains. One day, a "strong dark wind" blows - work of a black snake - and a youth appears to them (the black snake in human form). The youth asks the man to become his apprentice, but the man will talk to his wife first. The old couple agree to take him in as a son-in-law. The next day, the old man and the three daughters meet a white-bearded man, who tells he is a local mountain god and warns them against the youth, who is a black snake. With this new information, the old couple have a change of heart. The old man then goes to meet the youth on his own. The youth admits he is the snake spirit, but assures the man he has a kind heart and will provide him with food, clothes and silver, then makes a demand to marry one of the man's daughters, or he will hurt the human. The man goes back home and asks which of his three daughters agrees to marry the snake spirit. The elder two refuse, and are reproached by the man, but the youngest offers herself to the snake spirit. The man goes to tell the snake spirit of his daughter's decision, and goes with him to the snake's house, where the youth promises to take care of the third daughter as his wife. He also warns that he is the only snake that can turn into a man, not his snake followers, and that her family can only visit his wife once a year. After the snake spirit goes to fetch his bride, the old woman gives her daughter two bags of millet for her to drop the grains to create a trail for her mother to follow. The girl obeys. She has a good life with the snake spirit, and her mother follows the trail of millet to the snake's cavern, but she cannot go in. The snake spirit takes her soul and shows her that her daughter is alive and living well. The old woman wakes up and meets the mountain god, who advises her to call out for her daughter for three days. The attempt works and her daughter invites her mother in. The girl suggests her mother brings her elder daughters the next time she visits. It happens so. Seeing her younger sister's good life, the eldest sister begins to feel jealous and devises a vicious plan: she convinces her sister to let her stay for a few days. During her extended stay, the eldest sister takes her sister for a stroll in the gardens, shoves her down a well, and takes her place. The snake spirit comes back home and notices his wife looks and sounds different, but believes her given explanations. One night, however, the snake spirit's true wife's soul appears in his dreams and reveals the truth. The snake spirit searches the well and finds his wife's corpse. With a spell, the eldest sister is strangled to death by her clothes, and with another, the snake spirit revives his wife.

===== The Snake Spirit =====
In a tale published by Chinese author Lin Lan and translated by Juwen Zhang as The Snake Spirit, an old man has three daughters. One day, he goes to cut wood in the mountains and picks some flowers on their request. Suddenly, a snake spirit appears as a young human youth and asks the reason why he is fetching the flowers. Trying to avoid giving a straight answer, the old man lies that they are for his grandmother, then for his own mother, but eventually tells the truth. The snake spirit inquires the man about his daughters: they are three in number, the elder with big feet, the middle one with pockmarked face, and the youngest the most beautiful. The snake then demands the man brings his third daughter to him as his bride, lest he be devoured by the snake. The man hurries back home with the red flowers his daughters asked for, and explains the situation to them: the elder two refuse to marry the Snake, but the youngest agrees to spare her father's life. The elder two sisters decorate their younger sister's hair with the red flowers, and secretly whisper she will be devoured by the animal. The third daughter marries the snake spirit (called Snake) and lives a luxurious and happy life. The middle sister learns of this and becomes jealous, then pays a visit to her younger sister when her brother-in-law is not home. The middle sister convinces the girl to trade clothes with her and look at themselves in the mirror, then at a nearby well. The middle sister then shoves her sister down the well and takes her place, managing to fool her brother-in-law Snake into thinking she is his true wife. Later, a small black bird flies out of the well and cries out "shame on her sister". Snake asks the bird to perch on his sleeve if he is his true wife. The little bird obeys, and Snake brings it home, all the while it keeps crying about the sister's shame, to the false wife's horror. One day, Snake leaves home and, while is away, the middle sister kills and cooks the bird. When Snake returns, the false wife serves the bird's meat as their meal: Snake's dish turns into meat, while the false wife's turn into bones. They throw the bones away and, on their place, a loquat tree sprouts: whenever Snake picks up a fruit, it becomes delicious; whenever the false wife does, it turns into manure - and the tale ends.

===== The Garden Snake =====
In another tale published by Lin Lan and translated by Juwen Zhang as The Garden Snake, a man goes to the mountains to chop wood and falls into a trap set by a garden snake with its skin. The man pleads for his life in name of his three daughters, which piques the snake's interest in marrying one of the man's daughters. The man goes home and inquires his daughters which will go to the garden snake; the elder two refuse, while the youngest agrees. The girl marries the snake and lives in love and luxury. One day, however, she begins to miss her family, and wishes to visit them; the garden snake agrees and gives her a pack of sesame seeds so she can plant them to mark her way home when they bloom. The girl goes back to her family's home in fine clothes and arouses the jealousy of her elder sister, who trades clothes and jewels with her and shoves her sister down a well. The elder sister goes back to the garden snake and passes herself off as his true wife. Some time later, while she is combing her hair in front of a mirror, a black bird perches on a tree and mocks the elder sister. She throws the comb to the bird, which dies, and cooks it. The garden snake eats his portions, which become fine meat, while her portions change into bones. Annoyed, she takes the food and throws it in the garden; a jujube tree sprouts on its place, yielding delicious dates to the garden snake, and dog excrement to the sister. The false wife fells the tree and makes a washing-stick out of a tree branch, but it tears apart her clothes when it is used, so it is thrown in the fire. Some relatives of the third sister sense something is wrong and pay a visit to the garden snake's house; they find a golden figure in the ashes, bring it home and hide it in a bamboo chest. While the relatives are away, the third sister leaves the bamboo chest, spins the cotton, and hides back in the chest, until she is discovered by her relatives. At last, both sisters are brought before the garden snake; he notices the deception and confirms his true wife's identity when her hair intertwines with his. As punishment, he devours his sister-in-law and lives with his true wife.

===== Mr. Snake and Lotus-Seed Face =====
In a tale from Fujian collected by Zheng Huicong with the title Mr. Snake and Lotus-Seed Face, a man lives in a mountain village and works collecting pig manure, which is why people call him Pig Manure Grandfather. One day, the man passes by another village and sees a beautiful garden filled with nice flowers. He appreciates their perfume when a youth appears to him. The man explains he was admiring the flowers, since his three daughters like to wear flowers in their hair. The youth becomes interested in the man's daughters: the elder two ugly, and the youngest with a face beautiful like a lotus seed. The youth explains he was born in the year of the snake, thus he is called Mr. Snake, and wishes to marry one of the man's daughters. Pig Manure Grandfather goes back home and brings his daughters a bouquet of jasmine flowers. Back home, the girls fight over the jasmine flowers, which begin to emit a song. The man explains Mr. Snake, a farmer like him, wishes to marry one of them; the elder two, Rice-Sieve Face and Crab-Dipper Face refuse to marry a lowly farmer, while Lotus-Seed Face agrees to his marriage proposal, and goes to the rear mountain to live with Mr. Snake. They work together in the flower garden and become well off. One day, Lotus-Seed Face becomes pregnant, and her father pays her a visit. He becomes dazzled with their material wealth, and returns home to tell his other daughters their sisters did fare well in her marriage. The elder sisters become jealous of their little sister's good fortune, but are chastised by their father. Despite the reproach, the pair secretly plan to steal Lotus-Seed Face's life for themselves. Some time later, the girls visit their little sister in Mr. Snake's house, and marvel at the latter's property. They convince her to go to a well outside the house, and shove her down it, and place a stone on its entrance. They then fight each other who gets to replace their sister, and Rice-Sieve Face pushes Crab-Dipper Face into a manure pit and goes to Mr. Snake's house to pass herself of as his true wife. Mr. Snake comes home and notices the woman's face is not his wife's, so Rice-Sieve Face spins a false story about shooing a porcupine and he believes in. Later, he goes to the well and removes the stone to fetch some water, when suddenly a little bird flies out of its dark depths and sings a song about Rice-Sieve Face's deception. Mr. Snake brings the little bird home, which Rice-Sieve Face kills and cooks as a meal to hide her secret. While eating the cooked bird, the meat becomes bone in her hands, which she throws outside. Lotus-Seed Face then goes through a cycle of transformations: from bone to bamboo, then to two chairs, then to ashes (since her sisters tosses the chairs in a fire). An old woman asks for a kindling and brings it home. When the old woman's grandson comes home, he tells her someone left a red turtle cake where she placed the kindling, and she goes to check, finding Lotus-Seed Face alive and asleep on a bed. The old woman calls Mr. Snake to her house, where he finds his wife alive and well, and learns of his sister-in-law's entire ploy. Back to Rice-Sieve Face, she hears a commotion outside and sees the populace coming for her. She tries to escape by jumping out of the window and running away, but she falls over the manure pit and sinks in it.

===== Snake-Groom (Inner Mongolia) =====
Sinologist Boris L. Riftin translated to Russian a Chinese tale sourced from Inner Mongolia and originally published in 1958. In this tale, titled "Жених-змей" ("Snake-Groom"), an old couple has seven daughters, the six elders with flowing hair and the youngest bald. One day, the old woman asks her husband to pick up his axe and go cut some golden flowers in the snake's garden, for their elder two daughters, and asks for a plain white one. The old man begins chopping the white flowers, when the axe slips into the snake's hole. The old man asks for the snake to retrieve the golden axe, and the snake says he is putting on his clothes first. The old man tells him to hasten, and the snake asks what the man can give in return. The old man tries to barter with the snake for some domestic animals (a cat and a chicken), then settles for a daughter as the snake's wife. The snake agrees to the deal, and orders the old man to return home and fetch his bride for him. The old man returns home and sits on an old millstone. His daughters notice the strange behaviour and every one asks what is the matter. The old man explains the situation and asks each daughter if they agree to be the snake's bride. The six elders refuse, but the youngest agrees, asking to be given a big comb first. Her father goes to the snake to get the comb and returns home. Before the seventh daughter walks the path towards the snake, she combs her hair three times, and a retinue of animals appears before her path: a ram carrying a golden basin, a sparrow a red line, swallows wine, and a camel brocades. The man takes his daughter to the snake, gets the golden axe, and returns home. Some time later, the second daughter wants to visit her little sister, and goes her way. She asks a shepherd, then a swineherd for directions, and both say she will climb a mountain and find a large heap of manure, where the girl lives with the snake. Dismissing their information, she does follow their instructions and finds the heap of manure, then calls for seventh daughter. Her little sister answers the call, and invites her sister in. They have a meal, then the little sister hides her elder sister from her snake husband. The snake husband comes in the house and senses a human smell. His wife tries to deflect the question, but admits her sister is hidden, for fear of the snake devouring her. The snake dismisses the notion and welcomes his sister-in-law to live with them. One day, after the snake leaves, the second daughter asks her little sister to trade clothes and earrings with her, then to see their reflections in the river. The elder sister shoves her little sister in the river and goes back to pass herself as the snake's wife. The snake returns and notices some differences with his "wife", but she spins a story of playing with her sister. Some time later, the snake goes near the river and a green parrot with red beak begins to speak and mock the snake. The snake returns home and mentions the event to his "wife". After three days, the snake returns and asks for the bird to perch on his sleeve if it is his wife. It happens thus, and the snake brings the bird home, ordering the false wife to look after the little animal. The false wife uses her utensils, and the bird begins to mock her nonstop. The false wife asks the snake for a vat of water, and drowns the bird in it, then lies that the bird drowned on its own. The false wife cooks the parrot and shares the meal with the snake, but almost chokes on a bone and tosses the dish in the garden. On its place, a date tree sprouts. When the false wife passes by the tree, a nest of wasps buzz around her to sting her; when the snake passes by it, his torn clothes become silky and beautiful. The false bride chops down the tree and makes a chair to sit on, but the chair prickles her behind with a thorn. The false wife then throws the chair in the oven and burns it down. At night, the snake hears a knocking and goes to investigate: he finds his true wife weaving and crying, and goes to embrace her. However, she declines him, for she is still dead, and bids him find objects for her to regain a body: snow to make a dress, a wild flower for a face, and branches for her bones. The snake obeys his wife's request and restores her to life, then expels his sister-in-law.

===== The Snake Man (Kuangtung) =====
In a South Chinese tale collected in Tung-wan, Kuangtung, and published by Wolfram Eberhard and Alide Eberhard with the title Der Schlangenmann ("The Snake Man"), an old farmer has seven daughters. One day, he goes to work in the fields with his hoe, when he finds a large, thick snake in front of him, which wraps around the farmer. The man pleads for his life, when the snake says he wants to be given one of the man's daughters as his bride, since he has seven daughters. The man questions who would marry a snake, when the animal tells the man to ask them. One by one, the man's seven daughters come to the fields and see a snake coiled around their father: the six elders bring him food, the eldest runs in fear, and every one of them refuses to marry the snake. His youngest daughter comes in and agrees to marry the snake to spare her father. The large snake releases the farmer and waits for his human bride. The farmer says goodbye to his youngest daughter as he delivers her to the snake, and follows after them. However, the skies and earth darken, rain and thunder strike, and the snake and the girl fly away to their home, a large golden palace and high towers. The snake then turns into a handsome youth, who is a Dragon Prince, son of the Dragon King, who lives in his crystal palace. The girl settles into her new life, being served by attendants, eating from silver and golden dishes, and wearing clothes of brocade and silk. After a month, the girl pays her family a visit accompanied by servants and adorned with jade and gold, and tells her family about her life with the snake man, earning her the secret jealousy of her fourth sister, who is the ugliest of the seven sister. Before she leaves, fourth sister asks her little sister if they can trade clothes and jewels and see their reflections in the water at the spring to find out who is the most beautiful. The girl falls for the trick and fourth sister shoves her down the spring and casts a stone to kill her, then takes her clothes to pass herself off as the snake man's true wife. She returns home with the servants and the snake man notices she is not his wife, due to his wife lacking marks of smallpox on her face, and having shining eyes and hands and feet like snow. The fourth sister lies that at her father's house she caught smallpox, which marked her face; lost an eye due to an illness and the Sun darkened the skin of her hands and feet. The snake man falls for the deception and lives with the false wife.

As for the true wife, her soul is transformed into a myna bird and flies off to her husband's window, mocking him in song about how he cannot see. The snake man then asks the bird to perch on his hand if it is his true wife, which the bird does. The youth then places the bird in a beautiful cage and feeds it, and every morning the bird mocks the false wife with a song. The false wife wants to kill the bird, and, when the snake mean leaves one day, she kills it and cooks it in a broth. The false wife blames the cat to explain the missing bird, and serves the broth: the snake man's dish is filled with delicious meat, while the false wife's only has malodorous bones. The false wife tosses the broth in the garden, where a bamboo tree sprouts. The bamboo tree provides shade and silver for the snake man, while it releases branches to snag at the false bride's hair and wasps to sting her face. Enraged, she cuts down the bamboo to make a bed out of it, which is soft to the snake man and scratching to the false wife, who tosses it in the fire. However, a spark hits her other eye, blinding her. At midnight, the snake man hears someone spinning outside his room and goes to investigate. He finds a maiden weaving and thinks she resembles his true wife. He goes to embrace her and she tells him everything that transpired. Enraged, he takes a knife and kills the false wife - the tale ends.

===== The Lord of the Snakes =====
In a Chinese tale translated to German as Der Schlangenjüngling ("The Snake Youth") and to English as The Lord of the Snakes, a kind girl lives with her ugly stepsister and stepmother who mistreat her and force her to do all chores. One day, she goes to the mountains with an axe to fetch firewood and finds bees swarming around a large, strange plant with glass leaves and orange-red flowers. She plucks one of its buds for herself and places it in her hair. She returns home with a bundle of wood and her step-relatives notice the beautiful flower in her hair, which does not grow around their house, and order her to fetch one for her stepsister. The next day, she goes to the same location where she found the flowers, which belongs to the garden of the Lord of the Snakes, who noticed the missing bud and vowed to find the thief. He finds the girl and confronts her about it. The girl is scared at first, but the Lord of the Snakes means to do her no harm and invites her to live with him. They marry and spend their days in happiness, tending to the flowers in his mountain garden. When it is springtime, the girl's stepsister whines about wanting a flower, and her mother goes to pluck one herself, since her stepdaughter went missing. The woman finds the garden with flowers and discovers her stepdaughter next to a man, and alerts them by stepping on a broken twig. The girl notices her stepmother, who feigns relief at finding her safe and sound, and invites her to her husband's palace. The stepmother marvels at the rich golden doors and luxurious jade hall of the palace, and begins to nurture envy towards her. The girl decides to show her stepmother the deep well of the water of life in the property, and the woman tricks the girl into seeing her reflection in the water. She then shoves her down the well. The woman returns home alone and the Lord of the Snakes asks where is his wife, and his stepmother-in-law lies that she slipped and fell in the well. The Lord of the Snakes tries to banish her, but she remains in the palace, while he mourns for his missing wife. One day, he approaches the well and a golden bird flies out of the water. The Lord of the Snakes asks the bird to land on his hand if it knows his wife, and the bird does so. He takes the little bird to the palace and it sings to him, to the stepmother's displeasure, who strangles the bird one day and blames the cat. The Lord of the Snakes cries for the bird and buries its body near a peach tree. His wife's soul enters the peach tree and it yields ripe peaches for him that sate thirst and hunger. The stepmother chops down the peach tree, but the Lord of the Snakes collects the remaining peaches, grabs the wood and fashions a lute out of it, which he plays to soothe his soul. The stepmother tosses the lute in the hearth to burn it to ashes. He returns home and finds the lute destroyed and some hot coals. He keeps the coals in a basket, and one day his tabby cat tells him he can revive his wife by pouring a hundred pails of the water of life for a hundred days over the coals. The stepmother, still at his palace, offers to bring her daughter to live with them, and the Lord of the Snakes tells her to return after a hundred days. After the woman leaves, the Lord of the Snakes starts the ritual. One night after a hundred days, he sleeps and feels his wife's hand caress his hair, indicating she is back to life. As the couple celebrate her return, the girl's stepfamily enter the palace and find her alive, then quickly rush out of the place, trip down the mountain and fall into a gorge.

===== Tsuee`rl and Liä`rl =====
In a Chinese tale sourced from the Han Chinese with the title Cuir he Lianr and translated to German as Tsuee`rl und Liä`rl ("Tsuee`rl and Liä`rl"), a farmer lives with his wife and daughter, named Cuir (Tsuee`rl); he tills the land while his wife weaves. In time, the wife falls ill and dies. The man grieves for her, until he takes another wife and father another daughter, named Lianr (Liä`rl). The new wife mistreats Cuir, and favours her own biological daughter. Both girls grow up: Cuir to a kind-hearted, beautiful and diligent daughter, and Lianr to a wicked, idle and ugly girl. One day, the farmer goes to work in the mountains and offers to bring something for his daughters. Lianr asks for a beautiful flower to wear in her hair. He chops wood, then finds a red blossom in the grass. He goes to pluck it, when a voice says that whoever wears the flower must marry it. The man discovers a large snake, who repeats the demand: the flower for a bride. The farmer fears for his life and his daughters', and agrees to marry one of his daughters. The man returns home with the flower and explains the situation to his family. His wife orders her stepdaughter, Cuir, to wear the snake's flower in her hair instead of her own daughter. By doing this, the farmer takes Cuir to the mountains to meet her intended bridegroom, the snake. The snake appears and reveals Cuir he is in fact a youth trapped under a spell, and he can be released if someone, out of love, washes him with her sweat. Cuir takes a hoe and cuts off grass to sweat, then washes the snake with her sweat, releasing the youth from the snake form. Cuir and the snake youth live together in the mountains in a small house.

One day, Cuir returns home and her stepfamily notice she looks happy, and begin to envy the girl's fortunate marriage. Lianr, driven by envy, asks Cuir to see in a mirror who is more beautiful, then into a water bucket; Cuir is the more beautiful of the two on every occasion. She then takes Cuir to a nearby well and tricks her into seeing their reflections in the water, then shoves her in. Lianr dons Cuir's clothes and returns home to the snake youth in the mountains. She passes herself off as her stepsister, and asks him not to light a lamp at night. The following morning, the snake youth notices his "wife" looks different, having a big mouth, big eyes, big hands, big feet and pockmarks. Lianr, posing as Cuir, lies that she slept on a bean basket that marked her face. Still suspecting something, the snake youth goes to ask his father-in-law, and discovers Cuir is dead. Suddenly, Cuir, as a bird, flies out of the well. The snake youth asks the bird to fly to his sleeve if it is his wife. It happens thus, and he takes the bird home. The snake youth takes care of the bird. One day, the bird mocks Lianr for pretending to be her, and the girl tramples the bird to hide the truth of her deceit. The snake youth takes the bird's remains and buries it under a jujube tree. The jujube tree begins to yield fruits for people to pluck. Lianr tries to pluck a fruit, but caterpillars fall on her, so she fells the tree. The snake youth takes the wood from the tree and makes a threshold out of it. Whenever Lianr walks over it, the threshold trips her, so she destroys the threshold. The snake youth makes a spinning wheel out of the splinters. The spinning wheel produces fine whenever the girls in the village use it, but coarse and rough when Lianr uses it. Annoyed, she tosses it in the fireplace to burn it. A neighbour old woman, Mrs. Wang (old Mother Wang), comes to the snake youth's house and asks for some coals, which he allows her to take. Old woman Wang comes to the fireplace, finds a ball of thread and takes it home with her. When old woman Wang leaves home and returns at night, she discovers her room is tidied up and someone is adding fabric to a loom. She decides to spy on whoever is doing these chores for her, and finds that out of the ball of thread comes Cuir. Old woman Wang finds the girl and hears the whole story. Old Mother Wang reunites Cuir with her husband. Defeated, Lianr jumps into the same well and turns into a toad, forever saying "she is not like her". Sinologist Rainer Schwarz translated the heroine's name, Cuir, as "kingfisher" and Lianr as "lotus blossom". Schwarz recognized the tale starts with a motif from tale type AT 425, Das Ungeheuer/Tier als Bräutigam ("The Monster/Animal as Bridegroom"), with the daughter's request, then, as second part, follows the cycle of reincarnations from AT 408, Die Drei Orangen ("The Three Oranges").

===== Yogur people =====
In a tale from the Yogur people titled Youngest Sister and Serpent Prince, a poor widowed man lives with his three daughters. One day, he goes with his ax to gather firewood to sell. He climbs a large pine tree and chops some branches, but lets his ax slip from his hands. The man climbs down the tree to get the ax back and sees a white serpent coiled around the ax. The animal explains he is the white serpent prince of the mountains, and asks for one of the man's daughters in marriage in exchange for returning the ax. The man agrees and runs back home. The next day, after having a nightmare, the man tells his three daughters about the marriage proposal. The elder daughters refuse to do so, but the third daughter, Youngest Daughter, agrees to marry the snake. While she goes on a journey, she goes to sleep and has a dream about a white-haired woman. In her vision, the white-haired woman tells the girl not to be afraid, for the snake prince and his family are immortals banished from the heavens. Youngest Daughter goes to the snakes' lair to meet her husband. She enters the cave and, after the gate locks behind her, the white snake turns into a man, and so do his family, to greet her. They marry and live happily. One day, however, she begins to miss home. She goes home to visit her father and her elder sister wants to visit her brother-in-law. The Eldest Daughter goes to the snake lair and faints at the sight of the snake family. The white snake prince turns to his human form and explains to his wife that in a few days time, the snake curse on him and his family will be lifted, and they will become humans forevermore. After the curse is lifted, her middle sister, Second Daughter, visits her and admires the beauty of the snake prince's human form, so she drowns her sister in the river and passes herself off as her little sister. Some time later, the false wife takes the horse to drink in the river, but a greenfinch bothers her. The snake prince takes the greenfinch home, and it craps on the false wife's food and drink, so much so that she kills the little bird and buries it in the ground. On its grave a thorny bush sprouts and hurts the false wife whenever she walks near it. She throws the bush in the fire to burn it and from its ashes a stone spindle appears and rolls out of the cave. An old woman finds the stone spindle and brings it home. When the old woman leaves and returns home, there is milk tea and food prepared. She discovers that her mysterious housekeeper is a girl, Youngest Daughter, who comes out of the stone spindle. One day, the girl convinces the old woman to invite the serpent prince to their house, but the false wife insists some tasks to be done first. After fulfilling the tasks, the snake prince and the false wife go to the old woman house, where Youngest Daughter drops her own golden wedding ring on the snake prince's bowl of food. He discovers the truth, takes a discarded snakeskin from his house and throws it at Second Daughter, the false wife, to turn her into a coloured snake.

===== Mulao people =====
In a tale from the Mulao people with the title Seventh Sister and her Snake Husband, a couple have seven daughters. One day, the parents want to build a new house for their family, and decide to use a large tree at the back of their garden. The man proclaims to marry one of his seven daughters to anyone who could help him cut down the tree. A python listens to his words and offers its help. The man tells his daughters about the python's proposal. Each of them refuse to marry the animal, but the youngest, who looks at the python and sees a handsome youth in its place, decides to marry it. She goes with the serpentine husband to the edge of the sea. The python gives her an incense and, after a ritual, the sea disappears and the youth appears in place of the python. The youth reveals he is the son of the Dragon King. The seventh daughter's auspicious marriage reaches the ears of her household, and the eldest sister begins to nurture great jealousy towards her littlest sister. Some time later, the Seventh Sister and the Dragon Prince visit her family on the occasion of her father's birthday, and Eldest Sister seizes the opportunity to toss the Seventh Sister down a well and takes her place. While Eldest Sister passes herself off as her youngest sister, a little bird comes out of the well and begins to mock her. Eldest Sister kills the bird, cooks it and throws the broth in the garden. A bamboo sprouts on the same place. The bamboo messes up Eldest Sister's hair and she asks the Dragon Prince to cut it down. The Dragon Prince goes to cut it, but the bamboo begs him to stop it. The Dragon Prince digs out the bamboo and brings it home. While he is away, the bamboo turns back to his true wife, the Seventh Sister, who sweeps the house while he is away. The Dragon Prince finds out his true wife is alive, restores her, and Eldest Sister, to avoid punishment, falls into the big water jug and drowns.

===== Hui people =====
In a tale from the Hui people, recorded in 1980 in Tongxin, Ningxia, with the title The Fifth Daughter, a man named Hasang has five beautiful daughters, and owns a special heirloom: a copper axe with a silvery handle, which he calls "silver axe with golden handle". One day, he goes to gather firewood, and passes by the garden of a young man named Shelengge. Hasang goes to pluck some flowers from the man's garden, but accidentally drops his axe inside the fenced garden. Hasang then calls out to Shelengge to help him retrieve his axe, all the while mentioning the "golden axe". This makes Shelengge think there is a rich man just outside his door. After he puts on some clothes, he goes to greet the stranger, by leaving his cave dwelling. He finds out the Hasang is actually poor, but apologizes and gives the old man one of the flowers in his garden to be delivered to one of Hasang's daughter as an engagement gift. Hasang returns home and explains the situation to his daughters: the four elders turn their faces at the proposal, since Shelengge is poor like them, but the youngest, called Fifth Daughter, agrees to marry the youth, for he is honest and hardworking. Fifth Daughter marries Shelengge and, through their joint hard work, improve their material conditions. Time passes, and Hasang's elder three daughters find suitable marriages, save for his fourth daughter, who cannot seem to find a suitor and, after seeing her twin sister's good life with Shelengge, regrets her decision. One day, when Shelengge is toiling away at the fields, Fourth Daughter visits Fifth Daughter under the pretence of helping her in some chores, and asks her to come to the riverbank so they can see their reflections on the water surface. Fourth Daughter trades clothes with her twin sisters and shoves her down the river, and goes home to take her place as Shelengge's wife. Shelengge falls for his sister-in-law's trick, and life goes on for them. One day, Shelengge goes to the river and finds a beautiful lotus flower. When the false wife goes to see it, there is only a drooping flower. This goes on for a while, until Fourth Daughter takes the lotus flower and burns it the fireplace. A peach pit falls out of the ashes and plants itself in Shelengge's garden. A peach tree blossoms and feeds Shelengge with large peaches in his sleep. Driven by curiosity, the youth and the false wife trade places in bed; still, the tree keeps feeding the youth with peaches, while it drops bitter pits in the false wife's mouth. Furious at the strange tree, the Fourth Daughter chops it down. When Shelengge returns and sees the cut tree stump, he embraces it and sheds tears on it. After three days, a lotus flower blooms on the stump, and later it opens up to reveal a little girl inside. The girl grows up into a woman - Fifth Daughter. Shelengge sees the transformation and realizes he has been deceived. Afraid of being punished, Fourth Daughter runs away, while Shelengge and Fifth Daughter live happily.

===== Dungan people =====
In a tale from a Dungan source translated to Russian as "Младшая сестра" ("The Youngest Sister"), a man named Susugui lies with his three daughters, the elder two like other girls and the youngest tongue-tied, thus being called Tusher, curly-haired and slow-witted. The elder two bully Tusher and dress her in rags. Susugui is stingy and never buys his daughters sweets. One day, they ask for honey and he decides to find some honey from his neighbour's Shalagur's apiary. The man, Shalagur, is a widower and places his guard dog, Khabaguvar, to guard it. Susugui creeps into Shalagur's garden one night and goes to steal a beehive with his golden hatchet, but the guard dog hears the noise he is making and barks to frighten him. Susugui leaves in a hurry and forgets the golden hatchet there. The following morning, the girls ask their father what is wrong, but only Tusher goads an answer from him. He explains the situation and the girls offer to fetch the hatchet. The elder goes to the garden while Shalagur is not at home, but is scared away by the dog. The same thing happens to the other two. After Shalagur returns home, the girls call out to him, but he only notices when he hears Tusher's voice. Shalagur lets out a laugh at the tone of the voice, like a child's, and tells the girls he will return the golden hatchet when one of them agrees to marry him. The elder says she would rather marry a garlic seller and the middle one a beggar, so Tusher agrees to be his bride. Their wedding is arranged and matchmakers agree to the details. The matchmaker asks the elder sisters to unveil their little sister, but they decline and mock her, so the matchmaker is the one to do it herself. Tusher marries Shalagur and they live in happiness and with their hard work.

The elder sisters pay the couple a visit and begin to feel jealous towards Tusher, the eldest the most of them, so she decides to get rid of Tusher and take Shalagur to herself. She learns witchcraft from an old witch, then invites her sister for a walk near the river. The eldest sister tricks Tusher into looking into the water, turns her into a bird with her magic powers, and rushes home to don her sister's clothes and pass herself off as Shalagur's wife. Shalagur returns home and notices Tusher looks different, so she lies that spent time under the sun and it darkened her face, and her feet are bigger because she walked more the day before. He notices this person is his sister-in-law and asks where is the elder sister, whom she lies is already home with their father. The girl casts a spell on him and he begins to live with her as his wife. One day, Shalagur takes a horse to bring provisions from the town and stops to let the horse drink water. The little bird perches on a bush and begins to speak to Shalagur, who asks the bird to fly to his hat if it understands human words. The bird does so, and he brings it home to put it in a cage. The elder sister begins to comb her hair, and the bird mocks her, calling her a dog's face. The elder sister is annoyed, grabs the bird and tosses it in the hearth. The bird turns into a red bead. Soon after, the Khulon witch, who taught the elder sister the spells, appears and asks for some coals she could borrow. The witch takes the coals, among them the red bead, and brings it home with her. At home, she notices the bead is special and places it on a shelf. When she leaves the house for her daily tasks and returns later, she finds the house tidied up, so she decides to investigate: she discovers the girl coming out of the bead. As soon as the witch enters the house, Tusher begins to transform into the red bead, but the witch removes the spell and keeps Tusher human. They begin to live together, and news of the girl living with the Khulonza witch spread. Shalagur suspects it could be her wife, and sends matchmakers to arrange a wedding between them. Tusher agrees to marry Shalagur again and demands the old witch lets her go. The elder sister, passing herself off as the true Tusher, opposes the marriage, but Shalagur goes through with the wedding and marries Tusher again. Tusher and her elder sister quarrel every day and Shalagur sides with Tusher. Unable to live in such circumstances, the elder sister drinks poison and dies. Shalagur and Tusher live their lives until old age.

=== Taiwan ===
==== Penghu Islands ====
In a tale collected in Penghu islands, an old man has three daughters. One day, he passes by a garden full of beautiful flowers and decides to take three blossoms for his daughters. Before he leaves, a snake intercepts him and reveals that the garden belongs to him, so one of the man's daughters is to marry him, lest he seizes the human. The man returns home in extreme distress and explains the situation to his daughters, asking which one will agree to marry the snake. The elder two daughters refuse, save for the youngest: on seeing her father's torment, she agrees to marry the snake. Soon enough, the snake creature appears to claim his bride, and takes her to its lair. The youngest sister lives a comfortable life, since the snake groom is very wealthy. One day, the eldest sister decides to pay a visit to her cadette. The tale then explains that the third sister is the most beautiful of the three, with an oval-shaped face, while the middle sister has a plain, egg-shaped face, and the eldest is the ugliest, with a wrinkled and rough face, like a porous rock. The eldest sister discovers her cadette is living in luxury, with fine clothes, a beautiful house and fine meals - and begins to nurture envy in her heart. She then plots to harm her: she invites her to a back garden of the snake groom's house to admire the flowers, and asks the cadette to bend over the well to admire their reflections in the water to see which is prettier. By doing this, the elder shoves the cadette into the well, then dons her clothes and returns to the snake groom's house. The man notices there is something wrong with his wife, since her face looks different and wrinkled. The false wife lies that she fell and scraped her face. A few days later, she goes to draw water from the well, and a little bird flies up to her carrying pole, mocking her in its chirping for being a false wife and wearing another person's clothes and using her camellia oil. The bird keeps mocking her nonstop. For this, she grabs the bird, kills it and cooks it. She eats the flesh and buries the remains and bones by the same well in the garden. Out of the bird's bones sprouts a bamboo shoot. After the tree grows, the false wife fashions a chair for her. Whenever she tries to sit, the chair wobbles and tosses her down, while it remains stead for the snake groom. The false wife throws the chair into the hearth to burn it. The chair burns and among the ashes a honggui cake, red-coloured and turtle-shaped, appears. The false wife finds the cake and brings it to her room, intent on eating it later, and hides it under a quilt. Later that night, the snake groom goes to sleep and lifts the quilt: he finds a beautiful young woman in bed, who he recognizes as his wife. The girl reveals that her eldest sister tried to kill her and she transformed back from a red tortoise cake to human form. The snake groom becomes enraged and kills the eldest sister, then lives with his true wife. The tale was also classified as the Chinese tale type 433D.

=== Southeast Asia ===
==== Vietnam ====
===== Meo people =====
In a Vietnamese tale collected from the Meo people, "Юноша в образе змеи" ("The Youth in the Form of a Snake"), a widowed father has three daughters, the youngest the most beautiful and industrious, the elder two idle and arrogant. One day, he goes to plow the fields and sees a large stone blocking his path. He tries to remove it, to no avail, and proclaims that he will give one of his daughters to anyone that can remove the stone. Suddenly, a large snake appears to offer its help, in case the man's promise is genuine. The man confirms it is and the snake moves the stone to the forest. The next day, the man goes to plow the field, and notices the snake is there, intent on cashing in on the man's promise. The man brings the snake home and asks his three daughters which will be the snake's wife. The elder two mock the snake's appearance, but the youngest invites the snake in, cooks some rice for it, and prepares a bed for it as if it is a normal guest. The girl and the snake begin to live as husband and wife. One night, the man goes to check on his third daughter and sees a youth sleeping beside her on the bed, and sees a discarded snakeskin near the bed. He hides the snakeskin somewhere no one can find it. The youth wakes up the next morning and asks his father-in-law for the snakeskin. The man tells him he got rid of the skin and that he should stay as a man. Now human, the youth and the third daughter live happily and have a son together, named Man Zu. The elder sisters, seeing her good fortune, plot to kill her and take her husband for themselves. The elder sister shoves the youngest into a cave and replaces her in the youth's bed, while she dies and becomes a bird. The youth suspects something amiss with his wife, but keeps it to himself. Some years pass, and Man Zu works in the fields and finds a cave entrance with a tree, a little bird perched on a branch. The bird talks to Man Zu and asks about his father. Man Zu tells his father about it and guides him to the tree. The youth asks the bird if it is his wife, and to perch on his arm as a sign of confirmation. The bird obeys and both men take the bird home. The false wife begins to suspect the bird is her sister, kills it, cooks and eats it. She gives some to the youth, but he refuses to eat and throws the food in the fireplace. The bird's remains become a pair of shears, hidden amidst the ashes and coals. One day, a neighbour, an old lady, comes to the house to borrow some coals for her fire, finds the shears and takes them with her. After some time, the old lady begins to notice that her house is neat and tidy and the food prepared, and no one seems to know why. One day, she pretends to leave her house and sees a girl coming out of the scissors, taking a broom and cleaning the place. The old woman surprises the girl and asks her to live with her as her daughter. Time passes and Man Zu visits the old lady, noticing the new girl and wondering if she could be his mother. Man Zu plucks a strand of her hair and brings to his father, who notices it is his wife's. With a stratagem, Man Zu lures the girl to his father's house, who takes her in, although she resists it at first. The snake youth hides his reborn wife in a room and warns her to lock it up. One day, however, the elder sisters visit the snake youth and, seeing the unlocked room, realize their sister is alive, but their first thought is about her lustrous hair. The reborn youngest sister simply tells them she boils a pot of hot water and, leaning on top of three benches, washes her hair in the boiling water. The sisters return home to repeat the procedure and fall into the boiling water. The compilers located its source from an informant in the Bac Ha province, and noted its proximity to the international tale type 433.

===== Cao Lan people =====
In a Vietnamese tale from the Cao Lan people with the title Hoàng tử rắn ("Snake Prince"), a widower lives with his three daughters in a village. During a year with severe drought that prevents him from planting rice, he decides to build a dam in a river to irrigate his fields. During construction, he places rocks to dam the river, and removes a large rock that covered a snake's hole. The snake complains and threatens to bite him. The man pleads for his life, and the snake suggests an exchange: something valuable for his life. The man mentions his three daughters, and the snake is interested. The animal accompanies the man home, while the man ponders on either sacrificing one daughter for the sake of the family, or dying and leaving the girls alone. When they arrive at his house, the man prepares a basket for the snake and calls his three daughters to explain the situation and mentions the prospect of marrying the snake. The elder two refuse, but the youngest recognizes her father's decision and agrees to marry the snake. He celebrates her wedding to the snake, and the girl accompanies her snake bridegroom to the river. When they reach the water, the snake tells her to close her eyes and only open then when she hears a door opening. She does so, and finds herself in a splendidly furnished house. The snake takes the girl to a jade chamber, then a handsome youth appears to her and invites her to meet the king and the queen. The girl rebuffs the man, despite his beauty, and says she is married to the snake. The youth says he is the snake, only that he removed his robes and still has two scales on his chin; he is also the only son of the King of the Sea ("Thuỷ Tề", in the original), and this is his palace, which maskes her the princess of the underwater kingdom.

The couple live together for three years and have a boy of two years. The girl begins to miss her family home after three years and wants to pay them a visit. The girl arrives back home with fruits and cakes from the underwater kingdom, and learns her father died in the meantime. Still, she spends time with her sisters, who comment on their little sister's good fortune. One day, the middle sister stays home, while the elder sister takes the youngest to visit their father's grave near the riverbank. The elder convinces the youngest to remove her royal dresses so that their father's spirit can recognize them, then says that since they are so poor to prepare something for her return home to the underwater kingdom, they could pluck some flowers and prepare some tea for the road. The youngest agrees and climbs up a tree, but the elder takes out a knife and chops the trunk, causing the tree to fall in the river and drown the youngest sister. The elder sister takes her sister's robes, puts them on and goes towards the river. She flicks her hand in the water three times and claps thrice: a servant pulls up a carp tail to which the girl grabs and is carried to the underwater palace. The prince comes to see his wife, but notices that despite having her robes, she is not his wife. The elder sister spins a lie that the youngest sister got sick, went to the river to find a remedy and drowned, then, out of familial love, she is ready to replace her. As for the real youngest sister, she turns into an oriole and flies underwater to be with her family. The elder sister tries to care for her nephew, but the boy only follows the oriole ("hoàng oanh", in the original), eating only when the oriole eats and with the bird fanning the child with its wings. Annoyed, the elder sister strangles the bird and tosses it in water. The bird manages to transform back into the youngest sister in human form, but a multi-armed demon kidnaps her.

The snake prince misses his wife, and the elder sister bemoans that she is getting old without marrying, so she tries to find a Snake Prince in the fields like her brother-in-law. At one time, she finds a large cobra which she tries to pull out of the hole, but it is a female snake that bites her neck. Back to the prince, he befriends the Flying Fish and learns that a demon captured a fairy, which is his true wife. The prince thanks the fish and goes to rescue his wife from the demon's cave. The prince wages war against the demon and his troops with his lacustrine army of fishes and shrimps, to a stalemate, until he decides to borrow a human fisherman's net to capture the demon. He borrows the net and promises basketfuls of squid to the human, uses the net to entrap the demon and releases his wife. The youngest sister laments that her sister tried to kill her, but pities her and allows her to return to land to care for their father's grave. In addition, noticing the plight of farmers that lack water and experience deadly droughts, she and her snake husband sometimes transform into black dragons, suck up seawater and spew it as clouds to cause rains for them. The tale was collected from a source named Lam Van Thao, from Quang Yên, Lập Thạch district, in Vĩnh Phúc.

===== Tay people =====
In a Vietnamese language from the Tay people with the title Vợ chàng Rắn ("Wife of Snake"), a man has two (or four) daughters. He tries to bail water from a pond and discovers that his instrument is leaky. Suddenly, a snake coils around him, preventing him from getting up. The man begs for his life and mentions his daughters, promising one of them to the snake. The animal follows the man home, who explains the situation to his daughters. The elder (or elders) refuse to marry the animal, save for the youngest. The snake marries the man's youngest daughter and removes his skin to become a handsome person. They have two children. The eldest sister begins to feel jealous of the cadette's good fortune and marriage and plots to kill her: she asks her to climb a starfruit tree to pick some fruits for them, but the elder chops up the tree, causing it to tumble into the pond. The cadette drowns, while the elder sister passes herself off as the snake husband's true wife, but her in-law know they are an imposter. Time passes, and a white lotus flower sprouts on the water surface. A servant of the snake husband, the horse groomer, takes the horse to cut some grass when a voice comes from the pond asking about the children crying for the mother and the husband looking for his wife. The horse groomer returns home to inform his master, the snake man, who goes to see it for himself. He listens to his wife's voice, fetches the white lotus and brings it home with him. The false wife finds the lotus, plucks a petal and throws it outside the window. A chicken eats it. The snake husband takes care of the chicken in a cage, but the false wife kills it to serve its meat in a meal. The snake husband refuses to eat it and throws the meal away; on the place it falls, a taro plant sprouts. The false wife digs the plant and cooks it for the pigs, but the pot keeps boiling and leaking hot water to burn her feet, so she pours the pot's contents in the garden. Two large bamboo trees sprout, proving shade for the snake husband. The false wife cuts it down and make sticks to hang mosquito nets on them, but the wood keeps hurting her face, so she tosses the objects in the fire to burn it. The smoke blinds her eyes, and she tosses the net out. An old woman passes by the snake husband's house, finds the discarded object and brings it home with her. When the old woman is not at home, a cloth is being woven by the snake's true wife, who is discovered by the old woman while she is weaving. The snake's true wife asks for the woman to bring chopsticks for her and boil some water. It happens thus, and the snake's wife is restored to human form, more beautiful than ever. The snake husband reunites with his wife. The false wife discovers her sister is alive and asks her what she did to become so beautiful. The younger sister says she boiled some water and took a bath in it. The elder sister does so and dies by entering the scalding water.

===== Hmong people =====
In a tale from the Hmong people (Mông, in the original) from northern Vietnam with the title RẮN THẦN ("Snake Deity"), a widower lives on the mountain and has three beautiful daughters, the third the most beautiful of them. One day, he goes to plow the fields and finds a large tree on the way. He takes an axe and chops down the tree for three days and three nights straight until he reaches the center of the tree. On the fourth day, the man discovers the tree is restored to its previous state and cries. Suddenly, a snake crawling by asks the man the reason for his sadness, and learns that the man tried to cut down the tree. The snake offers to help the man, who promises in return to give one of his daughters in marriage to the animal. The man goes back home, and the snake whips the large tree with his tail three times. The following morning, the man asks the snake to burn the tree and raze the area for his harvest, which the snake does by spitting fire. Lastly, the snake accompanies the man home, who sends for his daughters to open the door for the reptile. The elder two open the door, but slam it on the snake as soon as they see him. The cadette opens the door and brings a plate for the snake to lie on. At night, when everyone is asleep, the cadette, named Ba, sees a light emanating from the snake's sleeping place and deduces he is a god, come to test her family. Thus, the following morning, the man explains the snake helped him, so one of the girls needs to marry him in gratitude: the elder two refuse, save for the youngest, who packs her belongings and accompanies the snake. The snake stops by a stream and asks the girl to tie a red thread around his neck, for, if a human person appears with the same red thread, it is him. The snake slithers into the forest, and out comes a handsome youth with a red thread around his neck, to her delight and happiness. The now human snake husband takes her to a river, asks her to close her eyes and pay no heed to the sounds of geese and chickens. The girl does so, and is guided to his underwater palace, past geese, chickens and dogs. The snake husband introduces his human wife to his parents as they come out of the palace, and the parents arrange a wedding feast to celebrate.

Three years later, Ba gives birth to a young son, and her husband takes her to pay her family a visit. Ba learns that her father dies a year before, and her sisters begin to feel jealous she married a handsome man, so they conspire against her: Hai, the elder, takes Ba to the river to draw water. Hai offers to hold her nephew while Ba goes to fetch water, and shoves her cadette in the water. Ba is washed away by the current to a waterfall, and Hai takes the boy and returns with the snake husband to his palace, with him none the wiser. However, the snake husband's parents notice their daughter-in-law looks different, and Hai lies that her face got scarred when she fried some oil at home. The snake husband laments that his wife looks different and meaner than usual. As for the real Ba, she turns into a blue bird and flies around his palace. His horse groom sees the bird perch on the fence and ask about its baby. The horse groom goes to report the incident to the snake husband, who goes to talk to the bird. The snake husband asks the bird if it is his wife; the bird gives out a wail and perches on the snake's shoulder. The snake brings the bird home to take for it. At home, the bird annoys the false wife by calling her ugly and saying she stole the other's husband. When the snake is away at one time, Hai kills the bird, cooks it, then throws its bones and entrails in the garden, where bamboos sprout. The bamboos hinder Hai's weaving, so she orders the bamboos destroyed and made into beds. The snake's bed is comfortable, but Hai's bed shakes and makes her uncomfortable, so she throws it in the fire. A piece of bamboo remains, which their horse groom takes home with him. The piece explodes and reveals a silver ring, which the horse groom gives to the snake husband. The snake sees the image of his wife, Ba, in a waterfall on the ring, and deduces she was killed, so he goes to the waterfall, places the ring in a bucket and under the waterfall. After a period of days, Ba is restored to life, even more beautiful than before. Hai is surprised to see her sister is alive and asks what she did to become more beautiful. Ba lies to Hai that she took a bath under a waterfall. Hai goes to the same waterfall, but the current carries her to a whirlpool and she drowns. Ba and her snake husband live together and build a family.

==== Kachin people ====
In a Kachin tale titled Baren La Wa A Lam ("The Dragon Husband"), collected in Myanmar, an old woman lives with her husband and two daughters, Hkawn Nan and Lu Mai, a village near the confluence of rivers Mali and Nmai. The man dies, and the woman mourns and cries for her husband so much her eyes hurt. The sisters try to find any remedy for their mother, to no avail, so they make a vow in every village to marry the man who brings their mother the medicine. A man appears one day with his medicine bag and promises to help their mother. He applies the medicine to the woman's eyes and she regains her sight. The elder, Hkawn Nan, offers to marry him in gratitude for saving their mother, since it is customary for the elder to marry first. The man thanks Hkawn Nan, but reveals he is in fact the prince of the dragon realm in the confluence of the rivers. Hkawn Nan becomes scared of the man in light of this new information, then tells her sister Lu Mai about it, saying she would rather stay home to look after their elderly mother. Lu Mai accepts the dragon-man's proposal and they depart. They reach a river bank, and the dragon prince asks her to blink seven times. She does so, and finds herself in her husband's palace. They live happily and have a son together. One day, she begins to miss her family, and asks her husband if she can visit her elder sister and old mother. The dragon husband allows her a visit and sends a basketful of gold for his in-laws. Lu Mai brings the basket and her son home. Hkawn Nan believes that her youngest daughter was not human anymore, but she and her child are very much human, and tells them about living with the dragon husband in their palace. Hkawn Nan begins to feel jealous of her younger sister, and takes her to the forest to pick fruits. Hkawn Nan asks Lu Mai to climb a fruitful tree, while she takes care of the baby boy on land. Hkawn Nan says that the fruits are not ripe enough, so Lu Mai keeps dropping more fruits. Lastly, Hkawn Nan pinches her nephew's face so he cries, then shouts that a tiger is nearby. Lu Mai fears her son was killed by the animal, loses her balance, and falls from the tree to her death. Hkawn Nan returns to the dragon's palace and pretends to be her younger sister, since they are so alike. The deception manages to fool the dragon husband. Sometime later, a servant that looks after the baby takes the boy for a stroll in the garden outside. Suddenly, a bird on a tree begins to scream "my baby". One day, the servant asks the bird what it means with its words, since the boy is the son of the dragon prince. The bird gives no answer, save the same words, until one day the bird is asked again and it confesses that it is Lu Mai, the boy's real mother whom her elder sister tricked. The servant questions Lu Mai's bird form why she could not reveal herself to her husband, and the bird decides to let it go due to her goodness, but asks for the baby to be brought to her. After three years of living like her sister Lu Mai, Hkawn Nan asks the dragon prince, as a proof of his love for her, to kill the bird that talks on the tree, since she knows it is her sister in another form. The dragon husband goes to shoot an arrow at the bird, when the maidservant tells the prince that the bird is his true wife, Lu Mai. The prince dismisses the maidservant's words, so she bids him talk to the animal. The bird reveals that she is indeed his wife, so the dragon prince restores her to human form, then turns his sister-in-law into a bird with dragon medicine.

=== South Asia ===
In a tale from the Chamling language with the title Khusya Pucho, translated as Snake and Youngest Daughter, a couple has seven daughters. After the wife dies, one day, the man asks his daughters to fetch firewood for home, but they all refuse. The man himself goes to fetch firewood in the jungle, and finds a flower he wants to pluck to his daughters. As soon as he plucks it, a snake appears to him and demands his daughters, lest he devours him. The man obeys the snake's command, cuts firewood and returns home to explain the situation to his daughters; they all refuse to go with the snake. When the man is ready to leave, the youngest daughter agrees to go in his place. The snake bids the girl follow him to a river, where he will bathe and become a man. He exits the river as a man whom the girl does not recognize, but he assures her it is him. Then they build a house, and the now human snake gives her clothes and ornaments. Later, one of the girl's elder sisters, the second daughter, pays her a visit. When she sees her little sister's luxury, she invites her to bathe in the river. Near the river a ferris wheel has been put up: the elder swings a bit, then convinces the younger to take off her clothes so she could swing better. The younger sister does and the elder shoves her into the river, where she drowns. The elder then puts on her clothes to pass herself off as the human snake's wife. She returns home, but the human snake recognizes she is not his true wife, and so does the snake's son, a baby named Bhoptale, who cries nonstop for his mother. Fortunately, his mother returns as a spirit to nurse him. One night, the snake husband finds her and hatches a plan: while he sends the false wife to fetch rice, the true one will wait with an axe to hew the other one. It happens thus, and they kill the false wife, burying her in a heap, where a tall lemon tree sprouts. Years later, when their child is all grown up, the boy wants a lemon from the tree, although his parents warn him against it. Later, he allows the boy to fetch one, but he becomes stuck to the tree. His parents also become stuck to the tree and die.

==== India ====
Professor Sadhana Naithani published a tale originally collected by William Crooke. In this tale, two sisters, Sonth and Ganth, live together, and each has a daughter. On her deathbed, Sonth asks her sister to make her own daughter remove the cow-dung, and Ganth's daughter cook food. After she dies, Ganth inverts her dead sister's request. When the girls attain marriageable age, Ganth asks her husband to find a good husband for her daughter and a snake for her niece (Sonth's daughter). The human son-in-law brings silver jewelry for his bride, while the snake brings golden pieces. Sonth also had a son, and, after his sister's marriage to a snake, leaves for Benares. Back to the cousins, the one married to a snake cooks food in her mother-in-law's home, while the Gânth's daughter does know how to cook food and is expelled from her house. Gânth's daughter goes to her cousin's house and is welcomed to live with her. The snake's mother asks her daughter-in-law how her son sleeps at night, and the girl says he takes off the skin at night. The snake's mother advises her to take the snakeskin and burn it. The girl does that and, where her hand is touching the snakeskin, it becomes gold. Later, Gânth's daughter invites her cousin to take a bath, and suggests they exchange clothes and ornaments. Gânth's sister then shoves her cousin into the river and she is washed away to Benares, where she is found by her own brother. Meanwhile, Gânth's daughter enters the snake's house and tells him his cousin drowned. Later, the snake, now a man, visits his brother-in-law in Benares on a pilgrimage and discovers the whole truth. The snake goes back home and banishes his sister-in-law.

==== Nepal ====
In a Nepalese tale collected in Dsarkot, Mustang with the title Der Hundebräutigam ("The Hound Bridegroom"), a woman has three unmarried daughters, which saddens her. So, she plays a ruse on them: she pretends to be on her deathbed and asks for her daughters to bring her some grass and water from a remote valley. Each of three daughters goes down to the valley to fetch the cure, when they are met by a hound that claims to own the valley. The hound allows each girl to go back with the grass and water, if they agree to marry him; the elder two refuse, while the youngest agrees to marry the hound in order to save her mother. Later, after she is given the cure, the mother hides her youngest under a cauldron in order to fool the dog, but the animal comes and takes his bride. The duo traverse a lake, then pass by a silver castle, a golden castle, and a castle made of dog excrement, where they live in abundance. Inside the third house, an old woman advises the girl to burn the dog's skin after he sleeps. She does and the dog becomes a human king named Kyirken Gambala ("older dog Gambala"). Despite his complaints, he forgives his wife for the deed. Later, he goes on a hunt and gives a set of keys to his wife. While he is away, she opens doors of silver, gold and coral, and goes down a mother-of-pearl staircase. Down the stairs, she can see the whole world: her elder sisters have married, but her parents are ill. She convinces her husband to visit them and bring presents. Kyirken Gambala and his wife go to her parents' house, and her elder sister grow jealous. The elder takes the youngest sister to a lake, shoves her into the water and takes her clothes. Kyirken Gambala goes back with his "wife", despite some suspicions about her new behaviour, like preparing a lord's meal for the servants and a servant's meal for him. Some time later, Kyirken Gambala is told about a bird that appears by the lake; he takes it in a cage and hangs it at home. The false wife kills the bird, cooks it with rice and serves it to Kyirken. The man notices the taste of bird meat and throws it away; some plants sprout in its place. The false wife orders the plants to be made into firewood; a poor couple fetches some, bring it with them and place it in a box. In the poor couple's house, the girl asks for the box to be opened, so she can come out, and gives the old couple her husband's golden ring. Later, the king receives the old couple and notices his ring on the old man's finger, and inquires about it. His true wife appears in the room and the false wife burns to ashes. Kyirken Gambala takes his true wife back.

In another Nepalese tale also titled Der Hundebräutigam ("The Hound Bridegroom"), collected in Lo Mantang, a poor couple live with their three daughters in a town. One day, a giant yellow dog comes to their house with a sack of money, and leaves the sack with the couple, but promises to return in two or three years. The couple's eldest daughter insists they should spend the money on dresses and jewels for them, since the dog may never return. The couple agree, but three years later, the dog does return and demands its sack back. Knowing the couple spent the money, the animal then demands one of their daughters in exchange; the elder two refuse, but the youngest agrees and goes with the dog. The girl lives with the dog and gives birth to two white puppies and a white one, but feels ashamed about her situation. The dog, however, goes to a palace, and the girl follows after him with the puppies. She discovers her husband is truly a human king under the canine skin, and lives happily with him. Some time later, the girl worries about her family's financial situation, since she lives in luxury, and convinces her husband to let her visit them. The girl pays a visit to their family in fine garments, to the jealousy of the elder sisters, who plot to kill her and take her place: the elder two shove their little sister into the lake, take their jewels and clothes, and go back to the king. They spin a story about their sister staying with their parents, and they are to live in the palace with their nephews. Meanwhile, a tree sprouts in the lake, and a small bird perches on its branches to ask a shepherd about the king in dog skin and its children. The shepherd informs the king, who goes to the lake to listen to the bird's lament. The king takes the bird with him and places it in a box; seven days later, his true wife comes out of it more beautiful than ever. With his wife back, the king orders his sisters-in-law to be banished from his palace, never to return.

==== Bhutan ====
Author Kunzang Choden published a Bhutanese tale titled Gyalpo Migkarla: an old couple live in a poor cottage. One day, the old man appears with a large swell on his knee, which greatly hinders his locomotion, so the old woman takes a ladle and bursts the swell; an ugly frog jumps out of it. The old woman grabs the frog and threatens to kill it, but the animal pleads for his life, and convinces the old couple to spare him, for he will bring home a bride. The next day, the frog hops to the local king's palace and, hiding under a slab of stone, announces he wants to marry one of the princesses. The king asks his three daughters, princesses Langyamo, Khempamo and Phurzamo to see who is talking; the first two dismiss it as the rustling of chickens and pig, but the youngest finds the frog on the slab and reports back to the king. The monarch invites the frog in and asks about his intentions; the frog answers he wants to marry one of his daughters. The king feels insulted by the frog's forwardness, and he begins to cry; two rivers of tears flow from his eyes. Seeing the frog's powers, the king asks his daughters which will go with the frog as his bride; the girls refuse and the frog laughs, causing the palace to shake. The king then repeats the question: the elder two are adamant in their refusal, but the youngest, Phurzamo, resigns to marry the amphibian. They move out to the old couple's house, who, on seeing that the frog fulfilled his promise, faint and die on the spot, leaving the house entirely to the frog and his wife. After some days into their marital life, princess Phurzamo notices that the frog takes out his frogskin and becomes a handsome youth. The princess decides to burn the skin, but the human frog warns her against it, but tells her to shake it inside the house, around the house, and outside, in the valleys and on the hills, then she can burn it. The princess follows his instructions, then leaves the burning for last: a large and splendid palace appears the next morning, filled with clothes, jewels, servants and granaries. Some time later, the princess's sister, Khempano, learns of her little sister's good fortune and pays her a visit, so she can kill her and take her place as the frog's bride. Khempano convinces Phurzamo to bathe in a distant stream and drowns her (the story explains she was a demon), then puts on her clothes to pass herself off as the human frog's wife, but the human frog's son does not recognize her as his mother, and cries. As for the human frog, he notices something different about his "wife", but does not pursue it further. Later, one of his servants, named Jow Pha La Phan Chung, goes to plow near the lake and notices a little bird perched on a bamboo tree that sprouted on the lake. The bird begins to ask the servant about the human frog (called 'Gyalpo Migkarla' by the bird), his son and the wife. The shepherd reports back to his master, and the human frog goes to see it for himself, but the bird does not appear. The next day, the human frog puts on the shepherd's clothes and meets the bird, asking it to perch on his ox if the animal is indeed his wife. The bird lands on the ox, and Gyalpo Migkarla brings the bird home with him. One day, Gyalpo Migkarla returns from a journey and finds his false wife ate the bird, but left a little bone behind. On getting the bone, it begins to talk to Gyalpo Migkarla, asking him to make offerings to the spirits and wrap it in brocade and silk. Gyalpo Migkarla follows the instructions, washing the bone and placing it in increasingly bigger boxes, until the bone turns back into princess Phurzamo. At the end of the tale, the reunited couple seek a tsawa lama to exorcize Khempamo from their palace.

=== East Asia ===
==== Tibet ====
In a Tibetan tale published by Tibetologist Yuri Parfionovich in the compilation "Игра Веталы с человеком" ("Vetala's Game with a Man") with the title "Лягушонок и царевна" ("Frog and Princess"), an old woman finds an abscess on her body that bursts open and releases a frog. Despite her husband's concerns, she raises the frog as a son. Years later, the frog begins to talk and asks his mother to ask for the hand of one of the emperor's daughters. The old woman makes her case to the emperor, but is rebuffed. The frog appears at the palace and demands one of his daughters: first, he laughs, and the palace shakes; then, he cries, and a flood emerges; lastly, he hops, and the earth quakes. Afraid of the frog, the emperor questions his three daughters which will go with the frog, and only the youngest agrees. The princess is given to the frog and goes with him to the old woman's hut. The next day, the hut becomes a grand palace, and both women realize that the frog is the son of the king of dragons. Some time later, the princess asks her husband if her sisters can visit them. The frog warns her against it, since he senses something wrong about them. Despite his warnings, the princess invites her sisters. The princess, her tongue loosened by drinks, reveals the frog is the son of the king of dragons who becomes a man at night by removing the amphibian skin. The other two, growing with envy of their sister's good fortune, plot to kill and replace her. After the human prince of dragons retires to his quarters, the elder princess shoves her younger sister through the window and down a well, and wears her clothes and jewels. The human dragon prince suspects something is wrong with his wife, but remains quiet. Some time later, a walnut tree sprouts from the well, and provides sweet fruits to the dragon prince and his adoptive mother and sour fruits to the false wife. The false wife orders the tree to be felled, burnt down and its ashes scattered over a field. The ashes become barley grains and a barley field grows overnight. The false wife orders the grains to be harvested and thrown in the water. The grains then change into little birds, one of which flies to the dragon prince's arm and is taken to his palace. The little bird then reveals the man the whole treachery. The tale was translated into English as The Frog and the Princess, wherein the dragon prince is a golden frog, his wife is tossed into a pool and turns into a lark, and as The Princess and the Frog, in a version of the compilation Tales of the Golden Corpse.

==== Mongolia ====
Hungarian orientalist László L. Lőrincz established the classification of the Mongolian tale corpus, published as Mongolische Märchentypus ("MMT"). In his system, he indexed two similar, but independent, Mongolian tale types. In the first type, MMT 152, Die böse Schwester ("The Evil Sister"): a man goes to fetch flowers for his daughter in the forest, but loses his axe; a youth appears and gives him the axe and the flowers, in return for one of the man's daughters; the man's youngest daughter (the heroine) agrees to marry the youth, but demands some tasks first (e.g., building a bridge between their houses); after they marry, the heroine's elder sister drowns her and takes her place, but she survives and goes through a cycle of reincarnations, including a bird; the heroine is restored at the end of the tale. In the second tale type, numbered MMT 258, Die böse Schwester ("The Evil Sister"), the man loses his axe, which the youth returns in exchange for one of the former's daughters; the youngest marries the youth, but is killed by her sisters in the water and goes through a cycle of transformations until she regains human form; the elder sisters are punished.

==== Japan ====
Japanese scholar Hiroko Ikeda, in her index of Japanese folktales, indexed a similar Japanese type which she classified as type 408A, "Murder by the Spring Revealed (Migawari Yome)", with five variants. In Ikeda's type, a father promises his youngest daughter to a monster (snake or ogre) as reward for a favour, but, despite some initial misgivings, the girl (the heroine)'s marriage to the monster is a happy and fortunate one. The heroine's elder sister pays her a visit and, on seeing her happy life, kills the heroine out of jealousy and replaces her. The heroine goes through a cycle of transformations (from bird, to tree, to ashes, to a jewel). The heroine regains human form and weaves in secret, then cooks a very salty meal for her husband, teasing him about not recognizing the heroine, his true wife, from a false one. The heroine is reinstated, and the traitorous sister turns into an insect after hiding under a mortar.

=== Lisu people ===
Professor Paul Durrenberger collected a tale from the Lisu people: a widow goes near the lake to cut grass for her horse and sees a tree with seven beautiful flowers she plucks for her seven daughters. When she is ready to leave, she tries to lift the basket she brought with her, but it is too heavy. She checks inside the basket and sees a dragon in the bottom, who begins to talk and demands the widow surrenders one of her seven daughters to him, otherwise he will kill the woman. The widow goes home and asks her seven daughters which will go with the dragon: each of them refuses to be the dragon's bride, save the youngest, who agrees to live with the dragon to spare her mother's life. The girl goes to the dragon's path and sees a man who asks to be deloused. She does as asked and sees a scaly skin on his head, releasing a scream that scares the man into the jungle. She meets the man again down the road, who says he will take her on his back, but she cannot open her eyes during the journey, even if she hears seven doors opening and closing. It happens as the man says, and both reach a large golden palace, where even the tableware and chopsticks are made of gold. The man says he is the dragon, they marry and she gives birth to a son. Some time later, the girl's eldest sister pays them a visit, and says their mother wants to eat a fruit from the dragon's tree. The girl says she cannot climb the tree and carry her son in her arms, so she gives the baby to her sister. However, the baby begins to cry, and the eldest sister lies that he is crying for his mother's clothes. The girl takes off all her clothes and gives them to her sisters, climbs the tree naked and gets the fruit. The eldest sister takes the opportunity to shove her sister in the lake, where she drowns, wears all her clothes and passes herself as the dragon's true wife. She enters the dragon's palace, who does not recognize the woman as his wife, since they are physically different. The woman spins a story that she was away at her mother's house for so long that she physically changed when she slept in the hearth and insects ate her hair, which the dragon believes. One day, he sends his elder son to fetch grass for their horse, but twice he cannot do so due to bug bites. He goes a third and last time, and hear a bird singing about how the king is blind. The dragon's elder son takes his father to listen to the bird's song, and he takes the little bird with them. However, the little bird defecates on the utensils. This greatly angers the dragon, who kills it, cooks it and gives its flesh to the false wife's son and the bones to his own, but the former's food becomes bones and the latter's meat. The bird's meat and bones are tossed in the fireplace to burn, and the girl, continuing her cycle of transformations, becomes a pair of scissors, a bush, and a dog, which is taken in by an old woman. While the old woman leaves home to work in the fields, the dog becomes the girl and cooks for her. One day, she is discovered and adopted by the old woman. Later, the girl tells the woman to invite the dragon king to her house for a meal, but the dragon dismisses the woman's humble abode, and will only go if she can produce a golden palace with golden furniture. The girl provides the woman with some magical help, and builds the golden palace for the dragon. The dragon comes with the false wife and sees his true spouse in the old woman's house. To settle the dispute, he plants a golden and a silver spear on the ground, over which both sisters are to jump, whichever survives shall be proclaimed his true wife. The elder sister jumps over her three times, and dies impaled on third time, while the youngest sister jumps over hers and survives, thus regaining her status as the dragon's wife.

In a Lisu tale from Northeast India titled The Seven Sisters, a poor old widow has seven daughters. One day, they go to the grasslands to fetch grass to repair their house. The daughters leave ahead of their mother, who is busy trying to lift her bundle. The woman goes to check inside and finds a snake, which demands one of her daughters, lest it bites her. The woman returns home and explains the situation to her daughters: the six elders refuse to go with the snake, save for the youngest daughter. She goes to the grassland and finds the snake, then accompanies it to a beautiful house in a city by the river. They live together in the snake's house. Some time later, the snake notices the girl's restlessness and suggests she goes to the city to watch the sports: on the first day, a horserace; on the second, a wrestling match; on the third, a swimming contest. She watches the contests, where a lone contestant wins both competitions. On the third day, she forgets some coins at home, and goes back to fetch it, when she finds a man inside the house instead of the snake. man reveals he was the rider at the races, and his wife asks him never to turn into a reptile again. He agrees to her request, and both enjoy a happy life together, eventually welcoming a son after three years. One day, the girl keeps thinking of her former home and wishes to pay them a visit. The snake, now human, allows for a three day visit. The girl goes back to her family's home carrying her son with her, and her mother and sisters are happy to see her alive and well. The girl explains that her snake husband is actually human, after all: long ago, a sea monster killed his parents and adopted him, and he learnt to shapeshift into a snake. Nearing the end of her visit, the girl delivers her family some presents given by her husband, and readies herself to return to him. One of her sisters, Acha, offers to accompany her, and their mother gives a sword to her grandson as a gift. On the way, she decides to take her place as the human snake's wife. They walk until they reach a tree with beautiful flowers. Acha carries her nephew in her arms, and convinces her little sister to pluck some flowers for the baby. The girl climbs on the branches overlooking a river to do as requested, and Acha cuts down the tree. The girl falls down in the stream and washes away, while Acha takes the baby back with her to the human snake's house and passes herself off as his true wife, although he notices the exchange. As for the true wife, she is rescued by a fisherman couple, and lives with them. She tries to explain the whole story to them, but her tears interrupt the narration. Years later, she goes to catch some fishes upstream and finds a group of children playing in the sand. She cleans them up and sends them home. One day, she realizes one of the children is her own son, for a black mole on his back, and asks him about his home life. The boy says there are fights at home, and asks the girl (whom he does not recognize as his mother) to come with him. After some initial reluctance on her part, she eventually relents and accompanies the boy to the snake's house, where she finds her sister Acha cooking food and her husband. The human snake sights his real wife just outside and calls for Acha to come see her. Acha exits the kitchen and is stunned at the fact that her sister survived. The human snake, at last, plants seven swords across the door, and bids Acha and her sister jump over the blades; whoever manages shall be declared his true wife. The real wife does it safely, while Acha, heavy with guilt and shame, falls on the swords and breaks down in seven parts. The girl is back with her husband and son.

In a tale from the Lisu people translated to Russian with the title "Две сестры" ("Two Sisters"), on the slopes on Mount Biloshan an old woman lives with her three daughters. One day, the four of them go gather grass. The three daughters walk ahead, while their mother stays behind, since her bundle is strangely heavy. The woman discovers a large snake inside her bundle, which begins to talk and demands one of the woman's daughters as his bride, lest he devours her whole. The woman summons the daughters to ask which will go with the snake. The elder two refuse, but the youngest agrees to marry the snake. The snake bids the girl follow him, and, after walking a long time, they enter a deep forest, where they reach a large shining palace. The snake says this is their house, and turns into a handsome young man. They live happily together, and she gives birth to a boy, then decides to visit her family. She takes some agates and pearls with her, and goes back home. Her elder sister sees the fine brocades on her little sister and begins to nurture a deadly jealousy towards her, then decides to get rid of her and be with the snake. Soon enough, the snake's bride decides to return home to her husband, and her elder sister wishes to accompany her. During the journey, she insists to carry her nephew, as they make their way back to the snake's palace. On the road, the elder sister pinches her nephew to make him cry, and lies to the baby's mother he is asking for his mother's clothes. Nearly reaching the snake's palace, the duo stop by a large waterfall. The elder sister spots a red flower near the waterfall and asks for her little sister to fetch it for her baby. The girl goes to pluck the flower and her elder sister shoves her down the waterfall, then goes to the snake's palace to pass herself off as his wife. The human snake notices his "wife's" face looks different, less white, and the elder sister, pretending to be his wife, lies that she walked under the hot sun, and ashes from the mountain soot covered her face. The snake youth falls for her trick. Years later, the snake's son is nine years old and herds their buffaloes near the waterfall. One day, a little bird flies out of the waterfall and sings some verses about how the boy is herding and there is a stepmother at their house. The boy is distracted by the song and lets the buffaloes graze in their neighbours' lands. This happens twice more, until the boy tells his father about it. The snake youth goes accompanies his son and both go to investigate. The bird appears again and the snake youth bids it lands on his left palm. The bird obeys and the youth brings the bird home, placing it in a birdcage. The bird keeps singing his mocking verses, even to the false wife's face. One day, the false wife kills the bird, but a little bone remains behind. The youth returns home and the false wife feigns ignorance about the bird. The little bird's bone turns into a pair of scissors, which the false wife places inside a wardrobe, but when she goes to fetch the scissors, she discovers her clothes are all torn apart, then tosses the scissors through the window into a mountain road. An old woman finds the scissors and brings it home with her, but, the next day, she cannot find it, save for a little chicken that joins her. The old woman leaves to work in the fields, and when she returns home finds the food cooked for her. Some days later, she spies on the chicken becoming a young lady and discovers her, adopts her as her daughter and works with her in the fields. Some time later, the young lady, who is the snake's true wife, passes by her husband's house and he wishes to marry her, without recognizing it is his former wife. A wedding feast is arranged and everyone attends: the snake youth, his son and his false wife. The snake's true wife comes out of hiding and confronts her elder sister about her deception. The snake's youth cannot tell both women apart, and remembers that his wife could walk unharmed on bamboo nails, so he sets up a test to identify his true wife: the younger sister walks on the nails with no problem, while the elder sister tries to walk and falls on them, her body pierced by the plant. The snake youth remarries his true wife.

=== Anong language ===
In a tale from the Anong language collected from an informant named Fàn Guópŭ and translated as The Python, a couple has six daughters. After the husband dies, the widow goes to the mountains to gather cogon grass and brings it home. When she unloads the grass to dry in the sun, a large python appears out of the grass and demands one of the widow's daughters in marriage, lest it will bite her. Thus, the widow goes home to ask her daughters which will go with the snake: the elder five refuse, but the youngest agrees in order to spare her mother's life. The youngest walks with the python to a certain spot, when the python disappears and a man appears in its place, asking to be deloused. The girl checks his hair and can only find some snakeskin, then they move out to a cave. Years later, the couple have a son, and are paid a visit by the girl's family. After a while, her family goes home, but the second eldest daughter wants to stay awhile. Both sisters then go for a walk and reach a coral tree. The younger climbs the tree to pluck some coral and gives her son to her elder sister. However, the elder pinches her nephew to force him to cry, and she pretends the boy is asking for his mother's belongings (her hair ornaments, her necklace, her clothes and her earrings). The girl falls for her sister's trick and takes off her decorations and clothes, giving them to her sister. Seizing the opportunity, the elder sister chops down the tree and puts on her younger sister's clothes to pass herself off as the human python's wife. She returns home to the human python, who, despite some initial suspicions about his "wife", is actually fooled by the latter's excuses about her change in appearance. Years later, the python's son is all grown up and goes to the edge of the lake. A little bird appears and chirps the boy's name, which distracts him from herding their cows. This goes on for some time, until the human python asks his son what is happening to him. The boy then reveals the bird appears and keeps calling his name. The next day, the human python accompanies the boy in herding their cows and sees the bird. He then asks the bird to land on his palm if the little animal is his wife, and the bird fulfills the man's request. Father and son take the little bird home with them: during their meals, meat appears on their plates, while only excrement appears on the false wife's. This goes on for several days, until the false wife is fed up with the situation, kills the bird and tosses its body behind the door. The bird's remains become a pair of scissors, which are used by the false wife to cut their cloths, but the next day the fabric is torn into tiny pieces. Angered again, the false wife throws the scissors beneath the house, which turn back into the python's wife. Finally, the human python places a sharp knife on the threshold, and orders both women to cross the threshold, and whoever crosses it easily shall be declared his wife. The true wife jumps over the sharp knife, while her sister falls on it. Now back home, the python regains his true wife and lives happily with her and their son.

=== Uzbekistan ===
In an Uzbek tale translated into Russian as "СЕСТРЫ" ("Sisters"), an old woman lives with her three daughters. She goes to fetch firewood in the mountains and finds a serpent inside the bundle. The animal asks for one of the woman's daughters as his wife, so she returns home and questions her daughters: the elder two refuse, but only the youngest agrees to marry the serpent. The girl accompanies the serpent to a large palace deep within a forest, and the animal becomes a human youth. They marry and she gives birth to a child. Some time later, the girl begins to miss her family and wishes to visit them. She goes back home in splendid clothes and adorned with jewels, which greatly fuels the eldest sister's jealousy. After the girl's visit, the elder sister decides to accompany back home. Near the serpent's palace, the elder sister shoves her little sister down the river and wears her clothes. When she comes home, the serpent asks her about the physical changes on her face and skin, and she provides a flimsy excuse that manages to fool him. Time passes, when the serpent's son is nine years old, he grazes his father's flocks of sheep; a little bird perches next to him and sings a song. The boy informs his father of this and the serpent brings the little bird home. At home, the little bird's song mocks the serpent's false wife, who becomes irritated, kills the bird and throws the bones in the yard. Where the bones landed, a pair of scissors appeared. Once again, the false wife takes the scissors and throw them out of the window. A neighbouring lonely woman finds the object and brings it home; whenever she is not at home, the serpent's true wife, assuming a new form, cleans the old woman's house and prepares her food. The next day, the old woman discovers the girl and decides to adopt her. Some time later, the girl, under her new identity, pays a visit to the serpent's house, and his son indicates she is his true mother. Hearing this, the serpent sets a test to verify his wife's identity: both women are to walk through thorny thickets; whichever of them is "without sin" shall be left unharmed. The girl passes without any problem, while the false wife steps on the thorns, the bushes prickle her skin and she dies. The serpent's true wife is restored to her rightful place.

=== Europe ===
==== Georgia ====
European scholars Bengt Holbek and John Lindow stated that a similar narrative is "sporadically" found in Georgia. However, according to Georgian researcher Elene Gogiashvili, this narrative, also known as Sami da ("Three Sisters" (de)), is "widespread" ("verbreitet") in this country. In this tale, an old person gives her third and youngest daughter to a draconic being ('Gveleshapi') as its bride; the girl goes to live with the dragon, who takes off its skin and becomes a handsome man; the youngest has a child with the dragon-man, and later visits her sisters; the elder sister begins to envy her littlest sister, abandons her up an apple tree and goes to live with the dragon-man as his wife. Back to the real wife, she cries so much she melts into a puddle that falls on the ground; where the puddle lands, a reed sprouts, which her son uses to fashion a flute that begins to sing of the elder sister's treachery. Fearing the truth may be discovered, the elder sister, posing as the dragon-man's wife, breaks the flute in two and tosses it in the fireplace. However, she takes the ashes and throws them away; a poplar tree sprouts in its place which the false wife also destroys, save for a piece of wood an old woman takes with herself. The true wife comes out of the piece of wood and tells the truth to her husband. A Georgian variant was collected by scholar Isidor Levin with the title Die drei Schwestern ("The Three Sisters") and classified as types ATU 425, ATU 408 and ATU 780.

==== Azerbaijan ====
Azerbaijani scholarship registers a similar tale in Azerbaijan as tale type 425M*, "İlanın arvadı" ("The Snake's Wife"). In the Azeri type, the heroine marries a snake, then visits her elder sisters with her child; her elder sisters shove her in a river or well and she goes through a cycle of incarnations (from reed which is burned, and to a plane tree from the ashes); the heroine returns to life from the plane tree and tells the story to a marble knife with a secret stone; her husband learns the truth and punishes his sisters-in-law.

=== Literary versions ===
Children's books author Laurence Yep adapted a tale from Southern China in his work The Dragon Prince: A Chinese Beauty and the Beast Tale: a farmer has seven daughters, the seventh, named Seven, is industrious and talented, while her sister, Three, is ugly and lazy. One day, Seven finds a golden snake in the fields, takes it and releases it back into the water. The snake becomes a large dragon that threatens the farmer for one of his daughters in marriage. Only Seven offers to marry the dragon to save her father. The dragon takes Seven to his underwater palace and assumes a human form. They marry. Later, Seven visits her family with gifts and her sister Three, jealous of Seven's good fortune, tries to kill her by shoving her in the river and taking her place as the dragon's wife. Her plan fails, for the dragon eventually finds his true wife under an old woman's care.

== See also ==
- King Lindworm (ATU 433B)
- The Girl With Two Husbands (ATU 433B)
- The Dragon-Prince and the Stepmother (ATU 433B)
- Champavati (AaTh 433C)
- The Story of the Hamadryad (AaTh 433C)
- The Origin of the Sirenia (AaTh 433C)
- Animal as Bridegroom
- The Story of Tam and Cam
- Beauty and Pock Face
- The Boys with the Golden Stars
- The Snake Lord (Taiwanese tale)
- Sandrembi and Chaisra
- Princess Baleng and the Snake King
- The Younger Sister Marries the Snake
- Schalanggor (Monguor folktale)
- King Iguana (Indonesian folktale)
