= The Younger Sister Marries the Snake =

Paiwan folktale

The Younger Sister Marries the Snake (German: Die jüngere Schwester heiratet die Schlange) is a folktale from the Paiwan people, an indigenous people from Taiwan. In it, a father finds a flower from a snake spirit's garden and is forced to give his youngest daughter to the animal, who turns out to be a human, and their marriage is fortunate for the youngest daughter. Out of jealousy, the girl's sister conspires to take her place and kills her. The heroine, then, goes through a cycle of transformations, regains human form and takes revenge on her sister. The tale is related to the cycle of the animal bridegroom, but scholars consider it a narrative that developed in East Asia, since most of the tales are attested in China and Taiwan.

== Source ==
According to Hans Egli, the tale was collected from an informant named Karui, in Dashi.

== Summary ==
In this tale, a family of four live together: father, mother and two daughters. One day, the man goes to hunt wild boars in the mountains and, by nightfall, when he is returning home, he sights a tree yielding beautiful flowers and decides to pluck some for his two daughters. He climbs it, fetches some, but finds a large snake by the root of the tree. The snake begins to talk and says the flowers belong to him, which he should not have stolen, thus, as payment, the man is to forfeit one of the man's daughters as the snake's wife, lest he devours the man. The man agrees to the snake's threat and goes home to ask his daughters about it. He brings them the flowers, but starts to cry. His daughters ask him the reason for his sadness and he explains the situation, asking them which will go with the snake: the elder daughter vehemently refuses to do so, but the youngest agrees in order to spare her father.

The snake has followed the man home and watches the whole exchange, and invites the girls' mother and father to their wedding, which is to take place at the snake's home. The elder daughter stays home, while her family goes to the wedding between their cadette and the snake. When they arrive, the snake tells the human family his body "tastes like Ananas", which they might not bear, and sends them ahead of him. As the human parents and the girl climb down the stairs, they hear the ringing of bells behind them, and see that the snake has turned into a handsome youth. They enter the snake youth's splendid house. After the marriage, the snake youth gives his human parents-in-law gold and objects they carry home with some difficulty, since the presents are many. When they reach home, their elder daughter notices the richness of the gifts and is told they are the snake son-in-law's, whose house is rich and luxurious. This instills a feeling of envy in the girl, who wishes she could have married the snake. Time passes, the elder daughter announces she will pay her sister a visit, harbouring an idea to kill her.

Back to the snake and his wife, he tells her she has not to worry with anything in their abode. One day, he leaves for the mountains, and the girl is visited by her elder sister. When the elder sister sees the luxurious house, she begins to feel even more jealous of her cadette and plans how to kill her. She asks her cadette about the nearest water source and invites her to take a bath with her. After taking a bath, the elder sister puts on the cadette's clothes and, lulling the younger into a false sense of security, shoves her in the water and drowns her, then returns to the snake youth's house, where she pretends to be ill so as not to draw suspicions. The snake youth returns and notices his 'wife' is in bed, but the false wife asks him not to lift the covers, since she is sick.

The snake youth decides to prepare some food for his wife, when he hears the crickets chirping outside his house in a strange manner. Then, a swarm of flies appear before his face, to his puzzlement. The following morning, a bird perches on a tree in his garden and begins to sing. The snake youth listens to the bird's song and suspects there is some meaning to it, then bids the bird sing again. The bird begins to talk and admits it is his wife, while the woman lying in bed in his room is her elder sister, who killed her to take her place. The snake youth bids the bird to sing a third time so he could understand its meaning, then the situation sinks in. He takes a sword, kills the false wife in his bed and tosses the body in the mountains. When he returns home, the bird is perching on bed and has turned back into his true wife. The girl reveals everything to the snake youth, and they begin to live in happiness.

== Analysis ==
=== Tale type ===
The collector, Hans Egli, compared the tale to the Graeco-Roman myth of Cupid and Psyche, and classified it as type 425C, "Beauty and the Beast".

In the first catalogue of Chinese folktales, devised by folklorist Wolfram Eberhard in 1937, Eberhard abstracted a Chinese folktype he termed Der Schlangenmann ("The Serpent Husband"). In this type, indexed as number 31 in his catalogue, a man with many daughters marries his youngest daughter to a snake or snake spirit as a promise for a favour; the snake and the girl live happily, enticing the jealousy of the eldest sister; the eldest sister shoves the youngest sister into a well and takes her place; the youngest sister becomes a bird, then a tree (or bamboo), regains human form and unmasks her treacherous sister.

Chinese folklorist and scholar Ting Nai-tung established a second typological classification of Chinese folktales, and abstracted a similar narrative sequence. He named this tale type 433D, "The Snake Husband" (or "The Snake and Two Sisters").

In a joint article in Enzyklopädie des Märchens, European scholars Bengt Holbek and John Lindow described it as a "Chinese oikotype". In that regard, researcher Juwen Zhang indicated that type 433D, "Snake boy/husband and two sisters", is an example of local Chinese tale types that are not listed in the international ATU index.

=== Relation to other tale types ===
Ting described tale type 433D as a combination of the initial part of type 425C, "Beauty and the Beast", and the second part of type 408. Likewise, in the article about tale type King Lindworm in the Enzyklopädie des Märchens, Holbek and Lindow noted that Ting's new tale type combined motifs of ATU 425C, "Beauty and the Beast"; the heroine's transformation sequence that appears in tale type ATU 408, "The Love for Three Oranges", and the bird transformation from tale type ATU 720, "The Juniper Tree".

Taiwanese scholarship also recognizes some proximity between the Chinese tale type, the French story Beauty and the Beast (father plucks rose from the Beast and is forced to surrender him his daughter) and Italian The Three Oranges (heroine goes through cycle of transformations, including bird and tree), but emphasize that the European stories deal with love between heroine and hero, while the crux of the Chinese tale is the rivalry between a younger sister who married into good financial circumstances and her elder sister, wanting what the other has.

According to Christine Shojaei-Kawan's article, Walter Anderson, in his unpublished manuscript on The Three Oranges, identified a "Chinese mixed redaction" between the Snake Husband tale (which he listed as type AT 433A) and type 408, "The Three Oranges", in that the heroine is murdered and goes through a cycle of incarnations. However, Shojaei-Kawan considers that the motif of the transformation cycle already exists in South and East Asia unrelated to type 408, and suggests that the "mixed redaction" could be treated as an independent tale type.

=== Motifs ===
In his folktype system, Eberhard indicated that the number of sisters also varies between tales.

The heroine's father is ordered to surrender his daughter after he steals some of the snake's flowers from its garden, or asked to deliver her as the snake's reward for a favour (e.g., cutting all trees or retrieving his axe handle).

==== The snake husband ====
Egli considered that the marriage between the youngest sister and the snake fits "almost perfectly" in Paiwan imaginary: the snakes are Tsemas, spirits from the other world that are superior to humans and can shapeshift between snake and human forms. However, he noted that the snake husband in the tale lived "in this world" instead of underwater, which would not be part of the Paiwan worldview.

In his folktype system, Eberhard indicated that in some of the variants, the supernatural husband is a snake, snake spirit or a dragon, and another type of animal in others. He also agreed that the motif of the snake husband seemed very old.

In Ting's catalogue, the snake husband assumes human form, but it can also be a "flower god", a wolf, or a normal man.

==== The heroine's replacement ====
The heroine is drowned by her sister when she is convinced to bathe or to take a look at their reflections in water. In her cycle of transformations, she may change into many objects: a cradle, a baby carriage, a spindle, or a type of food (bread, or, as in Taiwanese variants, a red tortoise cake).

== Variants ==
Eberhard, in his 1937 catalogue, asserted the tale's spread across China, but supposed that its center of diffusion was Southern China, since most of the variants available at the time were collected there. In a later work, Eberhard associated the tale of the snake husband with the local snake cults of the Yüeh culture. In turn, Ting, in his 1978 study, listed several printed variants of his type 433D, confirming the dispersal of the story in his country.

In addition, in a later study, Eberhard reported tales from Yunnan province and among the indigenous peoples of Taiwan. In this regard, according to researcher Juwen Zhang, the tale type is very popular in both China and Taiwan, with more than 200 variants collected. According to Li Shouhua, research of the "Snake Bridegroom" in China unearthed over 220 stories, distributed across 25 ethnic groups across 21 provinces and regions of mainland and Taiwan, including from the Han people and the Rukai people and Bunun people among the Gaoshan of Taiwan. Shouhua also concluded that the Chinese Snake Bridegroom tales, especially the story of Snake Bridegroom and Two Sisters, were "unique" to China, with a "clearly defined" geographical distribution.

=== The Snake's Wife ===
In a tale from the Paiwan people translated as The Snake's Wife (Paiwan: vaɬaw nua qatjuvi), (Note: From Paiwan qatjuvi 'snake (generic)'; nua particle denoting genitive/partitive relationship; vaɬaw 'spouse'.) a man goes hunting and finds flowers for his daughters. Unbeknownst to him, the flowers belong to a snake, which demands the man returns the flowers to its garden. The snake then allows the man to keep the flowers, as long as he gives them to his daughters and whoever likes the bouquet shall become the snake's wife, otherwise it will bite the man. The man agrees to reptile's terms and brings the flowers home, explaining the situation to his family. The elder refuses to marry it, but the youngest, to spare her father's life, decides to be with the snake. The snake comes after three days and takes the girl to his house, where he turns into a handsome youth. The snake-man's house is splendid, and, after a while, his sister-in-law pays his wife a visit and marvels at it. Driven by envy, she decides to kill her own sister: first, she distracts her to look in the mirror, and trades clothes with her; then, she convinces her to go to a nearby well and shoves her sister down the well, taking her place. The snake-man comes back from the fields and notices that his "wife" looks ugly. Later, he goes to the well and finds a cockerel, which he recognizes as his true wife, and brings it home. The tells the false wife to look after the bird, but the false wife kills it out of spite, and prepares a meal out of it, serving it to the snake-man. When the snake-man eats his portions, meat appears, while the false wife chews only bones. Enraged, she throws the bones away; where they land, a pine tree sprouts, which they use for a stool. When the snake-man sits on it, the stool remains sturdy, while it wobbles for the false wife, who turns it into firewood - and the tale ends.

=== The Snake's Bride ===
In another tale from the Paiwan titled The Snake's Bride, a man named Jihong is looking for wild vegetables for his daughters' dinner, and finds a flower garden in the valley. In it, a beautiful white flower with golden-tipped petals and a fragrant perfume. Jihong approaches the flower and plucks it, when he hears a booming voice behind him: a large snake that owns the garden. Afraid, Jihong tries to return the flower to its place, to no use. The snake ponders how the man can pay him back, and asks if he has any daughters, offering a proposition: Jihong will have to surrender one of his daughters to the snake as its bride. Jihong returns home and explains the situation to his daughters, but only the youngest decides to take up on the snake's deal. The younger daughter accompanies the large snake to its abode: an underwater village at the bottom of the lake called "Spirit Lake". They live in their splendid lake palace, until one day, when the snake groom tells his wife he will have to tend to his fields, and says he will call for his sister to look after his human bride, but warns his wife that his sister may be "eccentric". It happens thus, and the snake's sister begins to live with her human sister-in-law while the snake is away at the fields, but, on seeing the human girl's beauty, she decides to get rid of her. She convinces her to take a look at herself in a mirror, and, as much as the snake sister tries to remove her red vest, her waistband and her necklace, the human girl is still prettier than her. Fuming with anger, she takes the girl to the lake and kills her sister-in-law. When the snake returns home, his sister lies that the human girl returned to her home village, and the snake, sad for his wife, promises to take her back. In order to maintain the charade, the snake sister takes her sister-in-law's clothes and rushes back to Jihong's house to pass herself off as his daughter. Jihong welcomes 'her' back, despite noticing something strange about her. At any rate, some time later, Jihong goes to fetch water from a well in his property, and finds a chicken at the bottom of the well, declaring that the girl at Jihong's house is not his true daughter. Jihong brings the chicken home with him. The next day, he and his other daughter go to the fields, and the snake sister kills the chicken to protect her secret, and makes a meal of the bird. Jihong and his other daughter refuse to eat the meal, and the snake sister throws it away; in its place, a pine tree sprouts. Later, the snake groom comes to his father-in-law's house in search of his wife, and meets the false wife. Jihong sees the pine tree, chops it down and makes a chair out of it. The snake groom sits on the chair, which remains steady, while the snake sister, masquerading as his wife, sits on the chair and it begins to shake violently, until it launches the snake sister in the air and she falls to the ground, dead. Then the chair remains still - the tale ends.

== See also ==
- The King of the Snakes
- Schalanggor (Monguor folktale)
- Princess Baleng and the Snake King
- The Snake Lord (Taiwanese tale)
