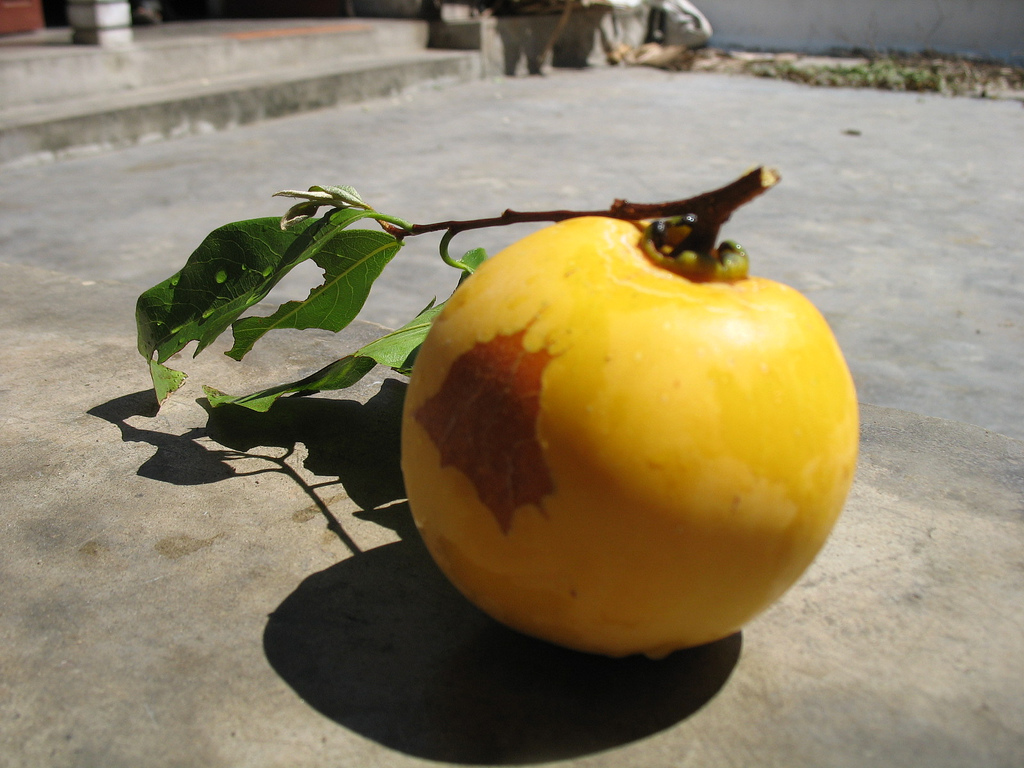
- Gold apple

Conservation status
- Least Concern (IUCN 3.1)

Scientific classification
- Kingdom: Plantae
- Clade: Tracheophytes
- Clade: Angiosperms
- Clade: Eudicots
- Clade: Asterids
- Order: Ericales
- Family: Ebenaceae
- Genus: Diospyros
- Species: D. decandra

Binomial name
- Diospyros decandra Lour.

Synonyms
- Diospyros packmannii C.B.Clarke

= Diospyros decandra =

Species of tree

Diospyros decandra is a species of flowering plant in the ebony and persimmon family, Ebenaceae. It is a small tropical tree, growing about 5–6 m tall. Its leaves are 6–8 cm long and 3–4 cm wide with a pointed tip. Its flowers are white. This species is popular in Vietnam, where it is grown in urban areas and close to temples. It is called "cây thị" in Vietnamese and it has appeared in Vietnamese folklore, such as The Story of Tam and Cam. It is also the official provincial tree of Chanthaburi and Nakhon Pathom provinces in Thailand; its Thai name is ลูกจัน "luuk-jan".

== Fruits ==
Its fruits are yellow-colored and are known as "Gold Apple" or "trái thị". They're about 3–6 cm in diameter and have a strong fragrant smell. The fruits are edible and are known to taste good if prepared correctly. They are believed to have medicinal value.

== Distribution ==
It is native to Cambodia, South-Central China, Laos, Myanmar, Thailand, and Vietnam.

== Photos ==
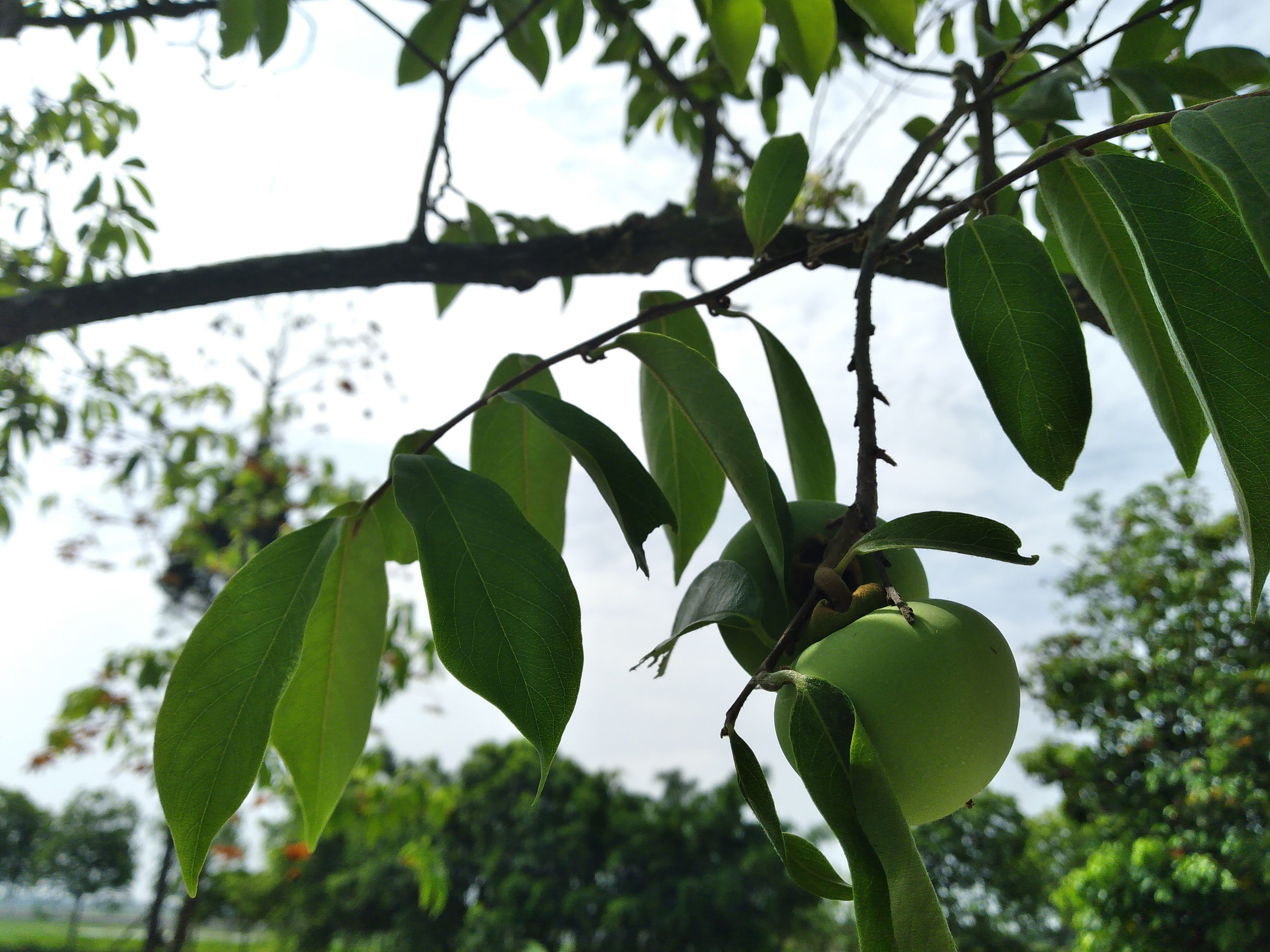

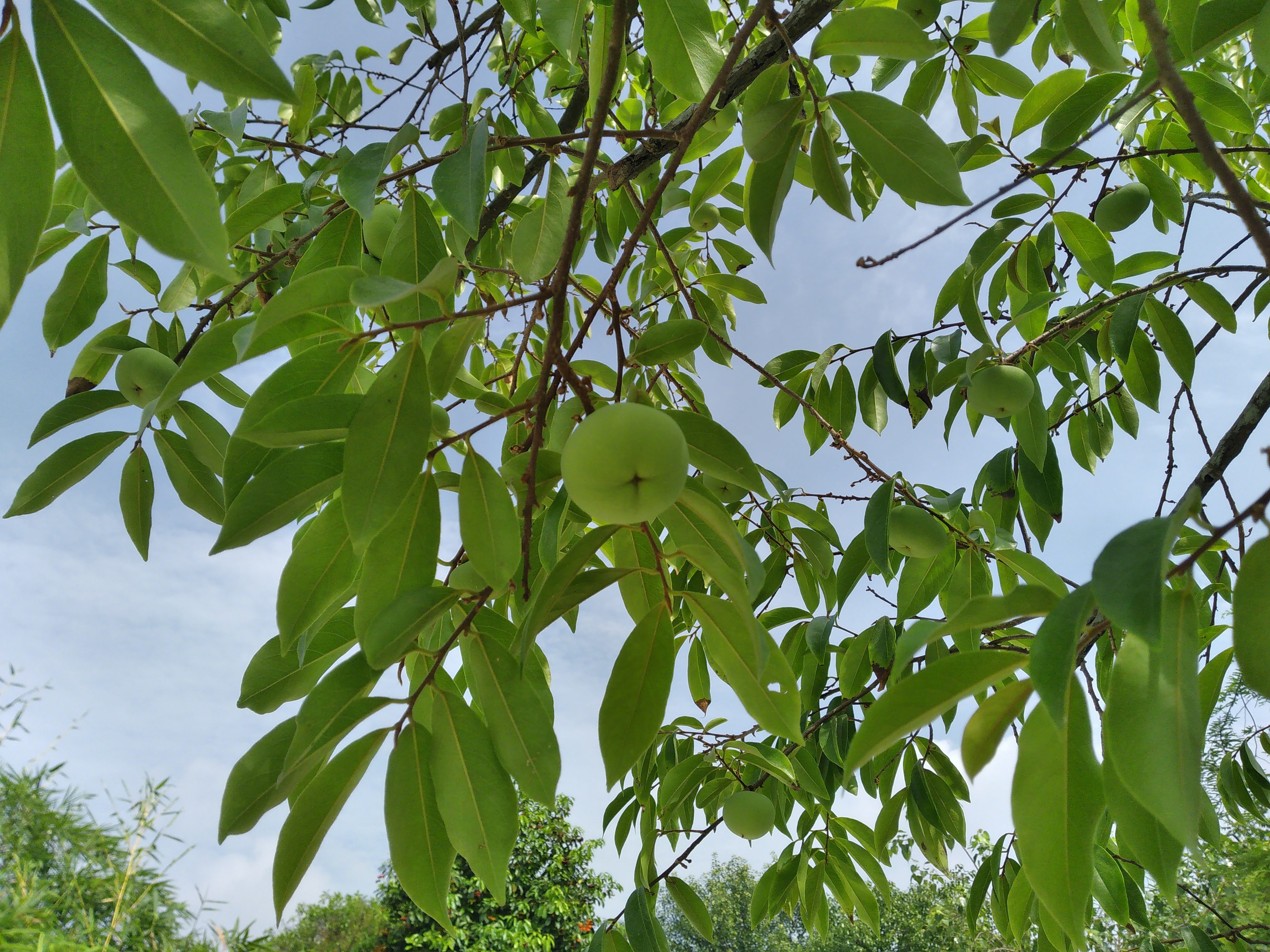
