= Princess Baleng and the Snake King =

Taiwanese folklore

Folk tale
- Name: Princess Baleng and the Snake King
- Also known as: Balenge ka abulru
- Mythology: Formosan
- Country: Taiwan

Princess Baleng
- Traditional Chinese: 巴冷公主
- Simplified Chinese: 巴冷公主
Transcriptions
Standard Mandarin
- Tongyong Pinyin: Bālěng Gōngjhǔ

Princess Baleng and the Snake King (Chinese: 巴冷公主; Tongyong Pinyin: Bālěng Gōngjhǔ, Rukai language: Balenge ka abulru) is a folktale from the Rukai people, one of the Taiwanese indigenous peoples. The story revolves around the marriage of the daughter of a Rukai chieftain to the Snake King. Due to the long history and lack of written records, there are many versions of the story. However, the legend and its important place in Rukai culture have contributed to the conservation of the area's ecosystem. Due to this legend, the Rukai people viewed Lake Xiaogui (Rukai: Taidrengere) as a sacred site, and enforced taboos against hunting or making excessive noise there. Some families even insist that they are the descendants of Princess Baleng.

== Legend ==
In the most widely circulated version of the story, the beloved daughter of a wise yet ailing and old Rukai chieftain named Princess Baleng ({巴冷公主) encountered and fell in love at the lake with a dashing young man named Adalio (阿達里歐). However, on the day of their planned wedding, Adalio arrived in the form of a hundred-pace snake at the head of a party of wild animals. Baleng's father, the Rukai chieftain, recognising that Adalio was an incarnation of the Snake King which protected the area, opposed proceeding with the marriage, but was also wary of offending the suitor. Hoping to dissuade him, he asked Adalio to give the bride seven-coloured glaze beads, which could only be obtained by descending the mountain and collecting them from the sea. After three years, the Snake King eventually surprised the chieftain by retrieving the beads and was subsequently allowed to marry Baleng. Immediately afterwards, the two disappeared into the Lake Xiaogui, and were never seen or heard from again. Since then, the two have been guarding the Rukai tribe for generations. To this day, Rukai girls still decorate and dress up with lilies to commemorate the unforgettable Princess Baleng.

== Variations ==
Other versions of the story vary widely. In one variation, Lake Xiaogui is a child born to Princess Baleng and the Snake King; whilst in another, the princess and a young man from another tribe commit suicide in the lake after their families reject their union. In one version, the chief dies due to his illness before Princess Baleng and the Snake King get married.

== Analysis ==
=== Tale type ===
Chinese scholars relate the tale to tale type ATU 433 of the international Aarne-Thompson-Uther Index, stories that involve human maidens marrying serpentine husbands. More specifically, it is classified as a Chinese type indexed as 433F, "型的蛇始祖型" ('The Snake Man as Ancestor'). In this regard, researcher Juwen Zhang indicated that type 433F, "Snake boy/husband as ancestor", is an example of local Chinese tale types that are not listed in the international ATU index.

=== Motifs ===
The Rukai consider the hundred-pacer an ancestor totem, and this is reflected in their clothing and architecture.

== Adaptations ==
=== Musical ===
The legend has been adapted into a musical named The First Lily and was featured at the 2010 Taipei International Flora Exposition. The musical was written and directed by Huang Chih-kai, who oversaw the co-production by Ping-fong Acting Troupe, one of Taiwan's modern theatre pioneers, and Formosa Aboriginal Song and Dance Troupe, a group dedicated to preserving the legacy of traditional song and dance.

=== Songs ===
The famous Rukai folk song Love in the Ghost Lake (鬼湖之戀) was based on this legend, of which the lyrics are Princess Baleng saying goodbye to her parents and other tribe members on the day she married the Snake King. Singer Usay Kawlu sang this song in the seventh season of One Million Star, a Taiwanese television singing competition, on 19 December 2010. Taiwanese aboriginal singers A-Mei and Biung Wang sang the song Princess Balenge together, and Legend of Lily with Cai Huiyu.

=== Books ===
Kadrese, Auvinnie (2003). Baleng and the Snake: Stories from the Rukai Tribe. 新自然主義. ISBN 9789576964909.

== See also ==
- The Snake Prince
- Eglė the Queen of Serpents
- King Lindworm
- Champavati
- The King of the Snakes
- The Younger Sister Marries the Snake
