= Bengt Holbek =

Danish folklorist (1933–1992)

Bengt Knud Holbek
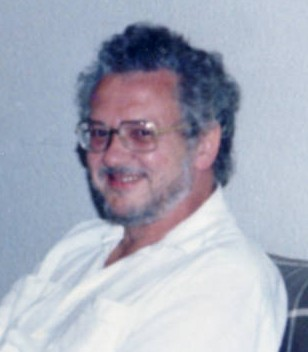
- Born: April 1, 1933; Copenhagen, Denmark
- Died: August 27, 1992 (aged 59); Faxe, Denmark

Bengt Holbek (April 1, 1933 – August 27, 1992) was a Danish folklorist known for his unorthodox approach to folklore theory. He wrote one of the definitive works of fairy tale scholarship entitled Interpretation of Fairy Tales (1987).

== Biography ==
Bengt Knud Holbek was born 1 April 1933 in Copenhagen and was the fourth of ten children. His father, Hans Holbek, was a civil engineer and his mother was named Elsebeth. He grew up in Ørholm and graduated from Lyngby Statskole in 1951.

Holbek studied Danish and Latin at the University of Copenhagen, and eventually earned a M.A. in Nordic Folklore in 1962. After graduating, he worked as an archivist at the Danish Folklore Archives. In 1968 he also began work as the director of the Nordic Institute of Folklore, a post which he held until 1972. In 1970 he became an assistant professor at the University of Copenhagen within the folklore department which he himself had graduated from. By 1972, he had been made a full-time professor. He received his Ph.D. in 1987 after defending his doctoral thesis, The Interpretation of Fairy Tales.

While studying at the University of Copenhagen, he married Bertha Dressel, a psychologist. The couple had three children. He died on 27 August 1992 while reading at his home in Denmark. His grave is located in Køge.

== Interpretation of Fairy Tales ==
Holbek's 1987 Interpretation of Fairy Tales details a method for use in the analysis of fairy tales and applies it to the tales found in the repertoires of five Danish peasants collected by Evald Tang Kristensen in the mid 19th century.

In brief, Holbek posits that fairy tales can be broken down into five "moves" which work to reconcile the three main tensions which are addressed by the fairy tale. These tensions are those between "youths" and "adults", those of "low status" and those of "high status", and "male" and "female". The relationships between these are frequently represented on a cube. Imagine a cube, place youth on the left, adulthood on the right, low status on the bottom, high status on the top, male on the front and female on the back. It is Holbek's estimation that one of the most important things that distinguish the fairy tale from the more general category of folktale is the fact that the tale ends with a marriage. By his definition, if the tale one is considering does not involve a marriage, it is not a fairy tale.

At the beginning of a fairy tale, the protagonist, who can be either male or female, generally starts out as an unmarried youth of low status. This person generally becomes involved with an unmarried youth of high status and must undergo trials in order to prove their worth, thereby attaining high status so as to be worthy of their lover. Here the characters move from the bottom of the cube to the top of it. Over the course of the tale, the characters also cease to act as children and pass from the sphere of youth to the sphere of adulthood. The characters move from the left half of the cube to the right. The tension between male and female is negotiated at the end by the marriage between the protagonist and their lover, rendering the space between the front and back of the cube irrelevant.

=== The five "moves" ===
Holbek's moves can be described as follows:

1. In move two, the Low Young for the purposes of this example let us say Male (LYM) leaves home in order to make his way in the world, thereby becoming a Low Adult Male (LAM).
2. In move three, the LAM meets the High Young Female (HYF) and they share some sort of illicit love.
3. Move one, if it occurs, tends to occur in flashback form during move three. Move one generally involves the HYF explaining how she came to be imprisoned in whatever situation the LAM saved her from. Move one occurs first in the chronology of the tale, even if it does not occur first in the sequence of events as they are narrated. Holbek acknowledged the awkwardness of this, but decided against doing anything about it.
4. Move four, if it occurs, is generally an intensification of move three. For example, the lovers are separated again and must undergo trials in order to reunite and regain the status they enjoyed at the end of move three.
5. Move five involves the LAM being compensated for what he has done, allowing him to become a High Adult Male (HAM) and the couple is married, allowing the HYF to attain adult status and become a HAF, and also allowing negotiation of the tension between the genders.

== Selected works ==
- "Hjorten, faaret og ulven. En fabels historie", 1960
- Æsops levned og fabler: Christiern Pedersens overswettelse qaf Stainhöwels Æsop, 1962
- "On the Classification of Folktales", 1965
- "Strukturalisme og folkloristik: I anledning af Børge Hansens eventyranalyse", 1972
- "Den bugede kat: Forsøg paa en structuranalyse", 1973
- "The Ballad and the Folk", 1974
- "The Ethnic Joke in Denmark", 1975
- "Eventyr som folketradition: Bibliografi til eventyrforskningen", 1976
- "Formal and Structural Studies of Oral Narrative: A Bibliography", 1978
- "Oppositions and Contrasts in Folklore", 1980
- "Moderne folkloristik of historisk materiale", 1981
- "Prose Narratives: Nordic research in Popular Prose Narrative", 1983
- "Folklorens betydning: Oplæg baseret paa et igangværende eventyrprojekt", 1987
- Interpretation of Fairy Tales: Danish Folklore in a European Perspective, 1987
- Danske Trylleeventyr, 1989
- "The language of Fairy Tales", 1989
- "Hans Christian Andersen's Use of Folketales", 1990
- "Variation and Tale-Type", 1990
- "On the Comparative Method in Folklore Research", 1992
- "Tendencies in Modern Folk Narrative Research", 1992
