= The Fisherman's Daughter (folktale) =

Jewish-Iranian tale about serpent bridegroom

Folk tale
- Name: The Fisherman's Daughter
- Also known as: בת הדייג
- Aarne–Thompson grouping: ATU 433B, "King Lindworm"
- Mythology: Jewish-Iranian
- Related: The Serpent Prince, or the Woman with Two Husbands; The Dragon-Prince and the Stepmother; The Girl with Two Husbands; Dragon-Child and Sun-Child

The Fisherman's Daughter (Hebrew: "בת הדייג") is a Jewish tale collected from a Jewish-Iranian source. The story is part of the more general cycle of the Animal as Bridegroom, and is classified in the Aarne–Thompson–Uther Index as tale type ATU 433B, a type that deals with maidens disenchanting serpentine husbands. (Note: German folklorist Hans-Jörg Uther, in his own revision of the folktale index, in 2004, subsumed previous types AaTh 433, AaTh 433A and AaTh 433C under only one type, ATU 433B.) In the story, however, the tale continues with the adventures of the banished heroine, who meets a dead youth, rescues and marries him, and she eventually is found by her first husband, the snake prince whom she disenchanted before.

== Source ==
The story was collected by author Hanina Mizrahi from a Jewish-Iranian source, archived in the Israeli Folktale Archives and indexed with the number IFA 7152.

== Summary ==
In this tale, a fisherman is a widower and has a daughter who helps him. He also fishes and sells them. A neighbouring widow sees the girl's chores and offers to marry her father to help him and take care of the girl. The girl tells her father about the workload at home and suggests he could take their neighbour as his wife. The fisherman is cautious about it, since the woman could mistreat her, but after much insistence on his daughter's part he marries the woman. At first, the new stepmother treats her kindly, but soon devolves into a harsh treatment. The girl suffers at home, so the fisherman takes her to his fishing trips. At the same time, the king's wife is pregnant, and walkes by the seashore. A sorcerer falls in love with the queen and transforms the unborn child in her womb into a snake, and she returns to the palace, unaware of the spell. One day, the fisherman casts the net into the sea and tries to pull something heavy, so he places the net into his daughter's hands and goes to the city to bring some workers to help him. After he leaves, a voice comes from the water amd begs to be released, in exchange for helping the girl and filling the nets with fish. The girl lets the net go, and a "princess frivan" emerges from the net, gives the girl three strands of her hair, for her to use in the time of need, fills the net with fishes as promised, then dives into the water. The fisherman pulls up the net and sells the fishes.

Back to the queen, she is ready to give birth, but as soon as the midwife touches the queen's body, she falls dead at once. Midwives are brought to help in the queen's delivery, but they all die. The king issues a proclamation for anyone to come work as the midwife for the queen and the unborn prince. The stepmother learns of this, decides to send her stepdaughter, the girl, to certain death, and lies to the king's messenger that the girl can help in the prince's delivery. The messengers take the girl by the shore, where she was with her father, and bring her to the palace. The girl burns one of the Queen Parvan's hairs, and it appears to her. Queen Parvan advises her to fetch a man of honey in a pot, boil it near the queen's body, and the prince will leave the queen's womb, sensing the smell. It happens thus, and the queen gives birth to a prince in snakeskin. The girl refuses any reward, and goes back home.

The snake prince grows up and when, he is five years old, the king sends teachers to instruct him and teach him the Torah. However, as soon as the teacher comes to see the snake prince, he falls dead. The same fate befalls other potential tutors and teachers, so the king issues a proclamation for anyone to come teach the prince. The stepmother goes to talk to the messengers about her stepdaughter and lies that she will be a great teacher. The king's messengers bring her in and she burns the second hair of the Queen Parvan; she appears and advises the girl to request two rooms for her and the prince, for books in seventy languages to be placed in a room and another fruits and delicacies for the prince, then she is to ask the prince which he prefers first, to eat or to study, and as soon as he is satisfied, she can teach him. The princess also warns the girl to refuse any reward. It happens thus, the girl teaches the snake prince, refuses the reward and returns home.

Later, the snake prince grows up and his parents arrange his marriage: they bring a bride of noble origin for him to marry, but dies as soon as she approaches him. The monarchs issue a proclamation for a bride to be found for the prince. The stepmother goes to talk to the king and says her stepdaughter can find him a bride. The girl burns the last of the hairs of the parven queen for help, and is advises to request three rooms, in one she is to light a candle, in the second she is to prepare a bath filled with lukewarm water, and in the third she is to prepare a bed with a mattress made of ostrich feathers, then she is to wear seven dresses; the snake prince is to enter the heated room and scream in pain, but they are to pay no heed to him; the prince will then remove a skin, and the girl is to remove a dress and throw it over the skin; after the prince removes the seven skins and she the seven dresses, the garments are to be burned together at once. After the time in the heated room, they are to bathe in the lukewarm clothes, then go to sleep in the third room.

The girl does as instructed, dons the seven dresses and locks the snake prince in the room. Amidst the screams, he removes his snakeskins, the girl throws the dresses over them and burns them all, then joins with the prince in human form for a bath and sleep on the soft bed. The following morning, the king opens the door and finds his son in human form and his daughter-in-law, and rejoices that the prince is released from the curse. After they celebrate, the prince asks his parents permission to marry the girl, who admits she is but a fisherman's daughter. Despite her humble origins, the king appoints the fisherman as vizier and marries the prince to the fisherman's daughter. They are happy for a time, until the prince longs to travel the world. After pleading with his father, the king allows the prince to depart, and the prince asks the king to watch over the fisherman's daughter while he is away.

On the road, the prince sends love letters to his wife, to the ire of the girl's stepmother (whose husband, the fisherman, became the vizier). One day, a letter reaches the vizier's house before the palace and the stepmother orders the scribes to insert a command to kill the princess. The new letter reaches the king, who cannot obey the request. However, the fisherman's daughter offers to leave the castle herself, and to endure any fate in the wilderness. She leaves the palace and wanders alone. After a long journey, she reaches a forest with a house amidst them, and knocks on the door. An old crone answers the door and tries to shoo her away. The girl begs to stay and is let in. Inside, she finds the corpse of a youth (another prince) which the old crone fans. The old crone explains that the youth is her son, whom a Dybbuk cursed to this dead-like state, but he revives at night to sport with the Dybbuk until dawn, when he returns to the death state.

The fisherman's daughter burns the hairs of the mermaid princess, who appears to her and advises her to take then measures of honey, boil it in a large pot; when the Dybbuk appears, it will be drawn to the honey; the girl is to lock the Dybbuk in and hide any source of water, so that the Dybbuk dies of thirsty. It happens thus: the Dybbuk comes to revive the youth, but it eats the honey, asks for some water and burns to ashes. The fisherman's daughter rescues the second prince, marries him and bears him a son and a daughter. Back to the human snake prince, after two years, he returns home, but cannot find his wife. The king shows him the adultered letters, and he decides to search for her. He reaches the same house deep in the woods and finds his wife there. The couple reunite, but the fisherman's daughter's second husband complains that the girl is embracing a stranger. The human snake prince says she is his wife first and foremost, so they take the matter to court. The judges state that the girl is the prince's wife, and sentence the second prince to live with his children, since God granted him descendants through the girl. The snake prince takes his wife back home and discovers the culprit: the scribe confesses that the stepmother threatened him with death him to write the false command. The stepmother realizes she has been found out, jumps from the palace roof and dies. The human snake prince is crowned king, and the vizier, the former fisherman, takes another wife.

== Analysis ==
=== Tale type ===
Scholars Heda Jason and Sarah Soroudi classified the tale as a combination of types: 510, 506, and 433B. Professor Reginetta Haboucha classified the tale as type 433B, "King Lindworm".

The first part of the tale corresponds, in the international Aarne-Thompson-Uther Index, to tale type ATU 433B, "King Lindworm": a serpent (snake, or dragon) son is born to a king and queen (either from a birthing implement or due to a wish); years later, the serpent prince wishes to marry, but he kills every bride they bring him; a girl is brought to him as a prospective bride, and wears several layers of cloth to parallel the serpent's skins; she disenchants him. Tale type ATU 433B, "King Lindworm", is part of the cycle of the Animal as Bridegroom, stories that involve a human maiden marrying a prince in animal form and disenchanting him.

=== Motifs ===
==== The snake husband ====
Scholar Jan-Öjvind Swahn, in his work about Cupid and Psyche and other Animal as Bridegroom tales, described that the King Lindworm tales are "usually characterized" by the motifs of "release by bathing" and "7 shifts and 7 skins". Similarly, according to Birgit Olsen, "in most versions" the heroine is advised by her mother's spirit to wear many shifts for her wedding night with the lindworm prince.

==== The heroine's dilemma ====
In some tales, in the second part of the story, the heroine is calumniated and expelled from home, then meets youths in the shape of birds whom she disenchants; later, the snake husband finds her at the bird youth's castle or a dead man's house and a test is set to decide which husband she is to be with. Greek folklorist Anna Angelopoulos noted that in "different versions", the heroine disenchants the serpent prince, but the story does not end at this point: the heroine is banished from the palace by her stepmother, but meets a "ghost" person that is prisoner of the fairies and whom she marries; she becomes pregnant by the second husband and is sent to the ghost husband's parents' house to give birth to their son; the first husband later appears to reclaim her.

According to Holbek and Lindow, this narrative was recorded from Southern Europe, Asia Minor, and Scandinavia. In the same vein, Swedish scholar Waldemar Liungman noted that the heroine, in the second part of the tale, is torn between a first and second husbands, and chooses the first – a dilemma that occurs "both in the Nordic as well as in variants from Eastern and Southeastern Europe". As for the nature of the second husband, he is a man cursed to be dead in the latter, while in the former region he is a prince in bird form or a man who has a contract with the Devil. In addition, according to Angelopoulos, the Israeli Folktale Archives (IFA) registers variants of the tale of the snake prince in Morocco, Libya, Kurdistan, Yemen and Iran, but only in the Judeo-Arabic variants of Yemen and Iran the story continues with a second part where a heroine marries a second husband.

== Adaptations ==
Author Peninnah Schram reworked the tale as the story The Fisherman's Daughter. In her version, a poor fisherman lives with his only daughter, beautiful Esther. Their neighbour, an old woman, tells Esther to convince her father to remarry, and the old woman offers to be the intended wife. One day, the local king and queen announce they will have a child, and hire help in the delivery of the prince, since every midwife has died in the process. Esther new step-mother suggests the king takes her as midwife – in hopes she falls dead, like the others -, but Esther is advised by a mermaid-princess on how to deliver the baby. A snake is born to the king and queen. When the prince is five, he begins to learn the Torah, but every tutor he has also dies. Once again, Esther is named by her step-mother as the prince's preceptor. The girl goes to the palace and burns a second hair of the mermaid-princess, who advises her again. Lastly, years later, the prince is at a marriageable age and asks his parents for a bride. The prince marries a selection of brides, but they die on the wedding night. As a final trap set by her step-mother, Esther is given to the snake as his bride. The girl burns the last hair of the mermaid-princess and is advised on how to disenchant him. At the end of the night, the snake prince sheds his seven snakeskins and becomes human. Esther tells him he is only a fisherman's daughter, but the prince declares that her father shall become his vizier. The step-mother, seeing that her plans failed, enters the sea and drowns. The tale ends.

== See also ==
- The Dragon-Prince and the Stepmother
- The Girl with Two Husbands
- Dragon-Child and Sun-Child
- Mimikakliu
- The Serpent Prince, or the Woman with Two Husbands
- Muchie-Lal
- Champavati
- The Story of the Hamadryad
- The Origin of the Sirenia
