= The Serpent Prince, or the Woman with Two Husbands =

The Serpent Prince, or the Woman with Two Husbands (French: Le prince serpent ou la femme aux deux maris) is a Jewish tale collected from a Judeo-Spanish source in Skoplje. The story is part of the more general cycle of the Animal as Bridegroom, and is classified in the Aarne–Thompson–Uther Index as tale type ATU 433B, a type that deals with maidens disenchanting serpentine husbands. (Note: German folklorist Hans-Jörg Uther, in his own revision of the folktale index, in 2004, subsumed previous types AaTh 433, AaTh 433A and AaTh 433C under only one type, ATU 433B.) In the story, however, the tale continues with the adventures of the banished heroine, who meets a dead youth, rescues and marries him, and she eventually is found by her first husband, the snake prince whom she disenchanted before.

== Source ==
The tale was collected from a seventy-year-old source named Djoya Kamhi.

== Summary ==
In this tale, a king has a queen who is childless. One day, they stroll in the fields and spot a snake under a tree with its young. The queen complains that even a snake has children, but not her. The snake overhears this, questions the queen's envy and curses her to bear a snake for a son. She becomes pregnant and, nine months later, the queen is ready to give birth. A midwife is brought to deliver the prince, but he devours the midwife. The king sends another midwife, who is devoured. Lastly, a stepmother (Note: Greek scholar Anna Angelopoulos notes that in other Balkanic variants the heroine kills her mother for her female teacher to marry her father, but the woman herself begins to mistreat her. As for her mother, she keeps helping her daughter even in death.) mentions her stepdaughter can serve as the queen's midwife. The girl is brought to the monarchs and questions the reason for her summoning. The king orders her to help in the prince's delivery, and she asks for a period of three days, then goes to cry on her mother's grave. After three days, her mother appears to her and advises her to ask the king for a leather suit and two bottles, one with milk and the other with honey, and two shovels. The girl offers the milk, then the honey for the snake prince, then removes him with the shovels. Next, nursemaids come to suckle the prince, but he bites their breasts to death. The stepmother sends her stepdaughter again to nurse the snake prince, since she helped in his delivery. The girl receives an order to nurse the prince, she asks for some time to think, and goes to her mother's grave to ask for advice: her mother's spirit tells her to don the leather suit and feed him with the honey and the milk jars. It happens thus.

Thirdly, the prince, now grown up, asks his father to marry, but the king questions who would want to marry a snake. The snake prince threatens to devours his head. The king then finds him a bride, whom he devours during the night. He brings another bride, and the second bride dies the same way. Finally, the stepmother goes to talk to the king and, citing a proverb ("Who caused this evil, let them undo it"), offers her stepdaughter as bride to the snake prince, since she was the one who delivered and nursed him. The king sends for the girl, who says she is note ready yet for marriage. Still, the girl tries to buy time by asking for a period of ten days, and goes to her mother's grave for counsel. Her mother's spirit advises the girl to don the leather suit and ask the king for two torches and two fire pokers for the nuptial night.

The girl marries the snake prince, who lunges on her. She takes a firepoker and sticks it in his mouth, then the other firepoker, and strikes him again, turning him into human. She notices the prince is naked, and he states that she got rid of his snakeskin. The girl knocks on the king's door for some clothes for the prince. The king marries his son to the girl in a grand ceremony. Nine months later, the princess is pregnant, and goes into labour. The girl's stepmother pays a visit and feigns surprise that they fell out of touch. The princess asks the queen not to leave her alone with the stepmother, but the queen goes to the bathroom. The stepmother asks to see the girl's face, then sticks a pin in her head, breaks the wall with her hands to throw her stepdaughter out, and replaces her in bed.

As for the girl, she reaches a desert place and finds a dead youth with a cloth on his face. The girl removes the cloth from the body and wears it. At night, the dead youth comes to life and finds the girl next to him. The girl says that she wanted to hold a vigil for him to protect him from being devoured, and tells him they can be together and marry. The dead youth agrees to marry her, but says he falls dead during the day and revives at night. Despite the condition, the girl and the dead youth marry. Nine months later, the girl is pregnant, and the dead youth takes her to his mother's house for her to give birth in safety. He also advises her to refuse the room his mother may offer as lodging, and for her to agree to stay at the stables. The girl dons a Gypsy disguise and knocks on the dead youth's mother's house. A servant informs the woman of the beggar woman, they let her in and place her in the stables.

The girl gives birth to a boy in the stables, and the dead youth pays them a visit at night, singing a song about if the boy's grandmother knew about the baby, if the stars vanished and the roosters fell silent, he would stay with his child. At dawn, the youth disappears. The following night, the youth returns to rock his son, and the maidservant overhears the song, then goes to report to the woman. The dead youth's mother goes to the stables to listen and recognizes the voice of her missing son. She then convenes with her husband, who suggests they seek the local king's counsel. Following the information in the song, the king advises the woman and her husband to cover the entire stable with a thin canvas of white cotton and hammer shining nails to represent stars. (Note: According to Anna Angelopoulos, this motif also appears in Greek variants of type 425D (sic): the hero is trapped with the fairies of the night; when his family prepares the fake nighttime scenario, the fairies believe that dawn has not yet come, and vanish with the sunrise.) The king also orders the roosters to be killed across the kingdom. By doing so, the dead youth is rescued.

The king pays the girl a visit, and she serves the family some jellies, laughing all the time. The king and the revived youth's parents wonder what is the reason for her behaviour, and the girl confesses: the king is her father-in-law, the snake prince's father. The girl retells how her stepmother threw her through the wall, how she found and married the dead youth, how she came to be there, and how the Snake Prince is sleeping with the stpemother. The king tells the revived youth's parents he will take his daughter-in-law back with them, and they can keep their son. The parents agree, and the girl returns in secret to the palace. The king places his daughter-in-law in a room, and goes to oversee his grandson's circumcision after seven days, with the presence of the stepmother. The king asks the stepmother what should be the punishment for a person that causes harm. The stepmother says they must be quartered and their pieces nailed to door. It happens thus.

== Analysis ==
=== Tale type ===
Professor Reginetta Haboucha classified the tale as type 433B, "King Lindworm". The first part of the tale corresponds, in the international Aarne-Thompson-Uther Index, to tale type ATU 433B, "King Lindworm": a serpent (snake, or dragon) son is born to a king and queen (either from a birthing implement or due to a wish); years later, the serpent prince wishes to marry, but he kills every bride they bring him; a girl is brought to him as a prospective bride, and wears several layers of cloth to parallel the serpent's skins; she disenchants him. Tale type ATU 433B, "King Lindworm", is part of the cycle of the Animal as Bridegroom, stories that involve a human maiden marrying a prince in animal form and disenchanting him.

=== Motifs ===
==== The snake husband ====
Scholar Jan-Öjvind Swahn, in his work about Cupid and Psyche and other Animal as Bridegroom tales, described that the King Lindworm tales are "usually characterized" by the motifs of "release by bathing" and "7 shifts and 7 skins". Similarly, according to Birgit Olsen, "in most versions" the heroine is advised by her mother's spirit to wear many shifts for her wedding night with the lindworm prince.

==== The heroine's dilemma ====
In some tales, in the second part of the story, the heroine is calumniated and expelled from home, then meets youths in the shape of birds whom she disenchants; later, the snake husband finds her at the bird youth's castle or a dead man's house and a test is set to decide which husband she is to be with. Greek folklorist Anna Angelopoulos noted that in "different versions", the heroine disenchants the serpent prince, but the story does not end at this point: the heroine is banished from the palace by her stepmother, but meets a "ghost" person that is prisoner of the fairies and whom she marries; she becomes pregnant by the second husband and is sent to the ghost husband's parents' house to give birth to their son; the first husband later appears to reclaim her.

According to Holbek and Lindow, this narrative was recorded from Southern Europe, Asia Minor, and Scandinavia. In the same vein, Swedish scholar Waldemar Liungman noted that the heroine, in the second part of the tale, is torn between a first and second husbands, and chooses the first - a dilemma that occurs "both in the Nordic as well as in variants from Eastern and Southeastern Europe". As for the nature of the second husband, he is a man cursed to be dead in the latter, while in the former region he is a prince in bird form or a man who has a contract with the Devil.

== Variants ==
=== The Girl and the Snake Man ===
In a Judeo-Spanish tale collected from an informant named Mérou Levi, in Salonica, with the title La niña y el culebro ("The Girl and the Snake Man"), translated into French with the title Le prince serpent, ou la fille aux deux maris ("The Serpent Prince, or the Girl with Two Husbands"), a king and a queen are childless, and she suffers for it. One day, she sees from the balcony a snake with its young and complains that even a snake has offspring. The she-snake notices the queen's words and warns that it may curse her to bear a snake. Nine months later, the queen is pregnant and ready to give birth. Midwives are called, but the prince bites them all to death. A woman learns of the situation and offers her stepdaughter as midwife, since she wants to get rid of her. The girl is brought before the king against her will, says she is only a child, and tries to buy time by asking for two hours respite. She then goes to cry on her mother's grave and falls asleep. Her mother's spirit advises her to request a large chair for the queen to sit on and a cauldron of boiling milk, for the snake to sense the smell and leave its mother's womb. It happens thus, and the queen gives birth to a snake.

Next, since the prince is male, he should be swaddled ("emmailloter"). Servants come to do so, but the snake prince jumps at their throats and bites them to death. The same woman offers her stepdaughter to swaddle the prince, since she was the one that helped in the delivery. The girl is forcefully brought again, asks for a two hour interval, then goes to cry on her mother's grave. Her mother's voice tells her to use a chainmail and gloves to swaddle the prince. It happens thus. Thirdly, the monarchs worry about feeding the prince, so they bring in nurses whom he bites to death. The same woman offers her stepdaughter's services as the prince's nurse, and the guards bring the girl again. The girl denies being able to do so, since she is barely a child, so she asks for two hours' respite and goes to cry on her mother's grave. For the third time, her mother's voice advises her: wear breastplates and have a jug of milk to nurse the snake son. It happens thus, and she nurses the prince for two years.

Ten years pass, the snake grows up and the king arranges his marriage: he marries a bride and bites her to death on the wedding night, which happens to a succession of brides. The stepmother offers her stepdaughter as the prince's bride. The girl is brought before the king, but tries to decline becoming the snake's bride by claiming she is only a poor girl of low status. Still, the king wants to go through with the wedding. The girl asks for some time and goes to her mother's grave. Her mother's spirit comforts her, saying she will be fortunate, and advises her: ask them to place a brazier inside the wedding chamber, filled with a sack of charcoal and able to fit a large fire. The mother then places two rods on her gravestone, one from Hell and the other from Paradise, for the girl to use on the prince: the prince will ask her to come to bed, but she is to let him go to bed first, then strike him with the rod of Hell; he will be furious, then she is to beat him with the rod of Paradise. He will insist for her to go to bed first, and she is to repeat the beating. By doing so, the prince will remove his snakeskin to become a naked youth, and she is to take the snakeskins and burn them in the brazier.

The girl returns to the palace and agrees to a marriage, then follows her mother's instructions to disenchant the prince. They spend the night together. The following morning, the king, worried about the girl, orders the khazanim to prepare the funeral rites, but finds a happy couple in bed. They celebrate another wedding. Months later, the girl becomes pregnant. Her stepmother learns of the fortunate marriage and plans to kill her: first, she buys a pan esponjado which she laces with poison and gives to the princess. The queen asks the girl to feed a morcel to the dogs, which eat it and die. Failing her first attempt, while the prince is away at war, the stepmother pays a visit to her stepdaughter, now heavily pregnant, and claims she will take her to see a theatre play in a neighbouring house. The princess thinks the queen will prevent her from leaving, but the queen tells her it will do her good.

The stepmother takes the princess to a desert field and leaves her there, on the pretense she is returning to fetch some food. Realizing the woman abandoned her, the princess wanders around until she finds a door with thirty-one rings, which she pulls to open and enters: inside, a furnished location with 31 rooms, 31 chimneys, 31 ovens, and 31 cauldrons, with only the last one open with food. She takes some pita from the oven and some rice from the cauldron, then goes to the verandah: suddenly, thirty-one youths (Note: According to Angelopoulos, in other variants, the youths are phantoms.) appear to her and claim they are the girl's suitor. To settle their dispute, the thirtieth-first says they should check from which cauldron she took food. The youths notice that the girl ate food from the thirtieth-first youth's cauldron, which makes her his. The youngest youth tells the girl to reach a palace and knock on the wall, then enter a door and ask for shelter, since the lord of the palace is a nobleman who lost his son.

The princess does as instructed and is given shelter, since she is ready to give birth, and the nobleman lodges her in an underground room. She gives birth to a son with a golden arrow in hand and a golden star on the front. At midnight, a kitchen maidservant hears a noise and goes to check on the girl through a fissure on the wall: she sees thirty-one youths enter the girl's room and surround the bed, the youngest of them produces bread from his pocket and tells the baby that if his parents knew the baby was his son, the child would be swaddled in golden clothes, and if the Sun did not rise, the stars did not hide, the rooster did not crow, he would remain. The roosters crow and announce the morning, and the youths vanish. The maidservant informs the lady of the palace about the events and they decide to spy on the following night. The following night, the youths return and the youngest tells the baby about the Sun, the stars and the crows, then vanishes with the dawn. The nobleman issues an order for the roosters to be killed and prepares a false scenario with the stars. The third night, the youths return and the youngest repeats his words. Since he cannot hear the roosters and thinks that it is still nighttime, the day breaks, but he remains with the girl and the baby, and the other youths also return to life. (Note: Angelopoulos noted that in other variants, the ghosts or fairies that trap the hero vanish with the dawn, but in this tale they return to life along with him.) The lord and lady of the house rejoice their son has been returned to them, and celebrate they have a grandson by arranging for his circumcision.

Back to the now human snake prince, he returns from the war and asks where is his wife. The queen tells him that the stepmother and the girl vanished and they tried to locate her, to no avail. The snake prince then decides to go after her, and the tale explains that God will lead him to the right path. The snake prince hears about the circumcision event and goes to attend it, waiting by the staircase. Inside, the people notice the newcomer, and the girl sends a servant with a bowl of soup to give to the stranger by the staircase. The girl also drops a ring inside the bowl. The snake prince eats the soup, sees the ring and recognizes it. After the celebration, the family asks why the prince did not leave, but he answers that he is taking his wife with him, and points to the girl the noble family has sheltered on that night. One of the youths complains that they have thirty-one people that claim her as their wife, but the youngest, the rescued youth, says she is no one's wife, so they should place her inside a circle and let the baby son ("nourrisson", in the French translation) choose his father. It happens thus, and the baby takes his father's hand, the girl's true husband. The family bids them goodbye with their blessings. Angelopoulos classified the French translation of the tale as type 433B.

=== The Dead Mother's Advice ===
In a Jewish-Spanish tale titled "העצות של האם המתה" ("The Dead Mother's Advice"), a king and a queen are childless. One day, they pass by a snake den and she sights a snake, complaining that even a snake enjoys the happiness that are children. The snake hears the queen's complaint, turns to her and curses that she gives birth to a snake, due to her narrow view. Nine months later, she gives birth to a snake as the prince. They do not know how to feed him, so they bring him many nurses in succession, whom he bites them all to death, until there is not any available nurses in the kingdom. Eventually, a woman appears and offers her stepdaughter to nurse the snake son. The poor girl goes to her dead mother's grave for counsel and is given advice: she puts on leather garments and feeds the snake with two gourd bottles, one filled with honey and the other with milk. Years pass, and the snake prince, now grown up, wants to be married. The monarchs question who would want to marry a snake, and the same woman appears to offer her stepdaughter as the prince's potential bride. The girl rushes to her mother's grave and is given advice: take three "pliers" and stick them inside the snake prince's mouth. By doing so, she disenchants the snake prince to human from. Sometime later, the girl and the prince have a son. The girl's stepmother goes to her stepdaughter room while she is resting after giving birth, throws her out and takes her place in bed. The girl wanders off until she finds herself in an open field. She discovers the body of a young man on the ground and decides to stay next to him to protect him from animals. At night, the young man comes to life and tells the girl he dies during the day and comes alive at night. They live together and the girl becomes pregnant. When it is time for her to give birth, the dead young man tells her to go to his mother's house and knock; if they let her in, she is to ask to give birth in the barn. It happens thus, and the girl gives birth to a second son, by the dead youth. At night, the baby's father appears to rock his son with a lullaby, singing that if the baby's grandmother knew about the baby's identity as her grandson, she would have pampered him, and that the youth would stay with his son if the stars did not go out and the roosters did not crow in the morning. The youth returns the following night and repeats the lullaby. A maidservant listens to the song and reports to the youth's mother, who recognizes the singer's voice as belonging to her son, who has mysteriously vanished. The lady and her husband report to the king, and they plan how to rescue the missing youth: they fashion artificial stars and order the roosters to be silenced. By doing so, the youth returns to his family. The king and the queen pay a visit to the lord and lady and discover their daughter-in-law there, married to the once missing youth. They bring her back to the castle and the wicked stepmother is executed.

== See also ==
- The Dragon-Prince and the Stepmother
- The Girl with Two Husbands
- Dragon-Child and Sun-Child
- Mimikakliu
- The Fisherman's Daughter
- Muchie-Lal
- Champavati
- The Story of the Hamadryad
- The Origin of the Sirenia
