= Mimikakliu (Albanian folktale) =

Mimikakliu is an Albanian folktale from Gjirokastër, collected by Albanian folklorists Anton Berisha and Myzafere Mustafa. The story is part of the more general cycle of the Animal as Bridegroom, and is classified in the Aarne–Thompson–Uther Index as tale type ATU 433B, a type that deals with maidens disenchanting serpentine husbands. (Note: German folklorist Hans-Jörg Uther, in his own revision of the folktale index, in 2004, subsumed previous types AaTh 433, AaTh 433A and AaTh 433C under only one type, ATU 433B.) In the Albanian story, however, the tale continues with the adventures of the banished heroine, who meets a man at a graveyard, rescues and marries him, and eventually is found by her first husband, the snake prince whom she disenchanted before.

== Summary ==
A king's daughter goes to school. Her teacher tells her she could become her new mother if the girl gets rid of her own mother: she is to convince the queen to prepare some pancakes for her with oil from an jug that lies outside the house; while her mother is fetching oil, the girl is to drop the lid on her, then she is to ask her father to marry the teacher. The princess does as instructed and drops the lid on her mother, but she turns into a cow. The princess laments her deed, and her father moves the cow-queen to the stables. Still, the princess convinces him to marry his teacher. At first, the school teacher treats the girl with tenderness, but eventually mistreats her. One day, the woman gives her a bundle of yarn to spin. The princess cries for it, and the cow-mother help her. The princess brings the spun yarn to her stepmother, who suspects this is not her doing. Next, the woman convinces the king to slaughter the cow-queen and eat her meat. The princess overhears the conversation and goes to help her mother, but the queen accepts her fate. The cow-queen also tells her daughter not to eat her meat, gather her remains and bury them, and she can come for counsel at any time. It happens thus.

The stepmother then turns her attention to the princess: she hears news that in a distant kingdom, a monarch has a snake for a son that devours his brides whenever he marries. Thus, the woman convinces the king that the princess is still single and should be married already, mentioning the snake prince as a suitor. Despite questioning that his daughter may be devoured, the king agrees to their marriage. The princess runs to the pit where she buried her mother's bones and cries that within a month they will marry her to a snake to be devoured. Her mother's spirit tells her not to worry, for the prince is not a snake, but a handsome person, and advises her to fetch six shirts, asks the king for thirty-five more; wear the shirts on the wedding night and, when the snake asks her to remove a shirt, she is to tell him to remove one of his layers. The princess obtains the forty-one shirts and is brought to the snake prince's kingdom. The king sees her face and complains about it, but the snake prince demands that his bride is brought him.

The princess marries the snake prince and is guided to the wedding chambers. The snake prince asks her to remove the shirts, but she tells him to remove his first. They each remove their layers of clothing until there is only one shirt on each. The princess sees his face and faints at his beauty. The snake prince wakes her up and bids her tell the king she was not devoured due to her love for him. The princess informs the king about it, then questions the snake prince how to turn him human permanently: he explains his father should burn the remaining snakeskin and not let him smell the burning. The snake prince dons the snakeskins in the morning and removes them at night. While the prince is asleep, the princess takes the forty layers of snakeskin he doffed, delivers them to the king, who rides to the other side of the world to burn them. In the morning, the prince wakes up and cannot find the snakeskins, so he asks his wife about it. The princess says the king took them himself, and how the prince is restored to human form for good. Now in human form, the prince meets his parents and decides to enlist in the military service.

The princess's stepmother, the former school teacher, writes a false letter to the snake prince's parents saying that the campaign is not going well and they should expel his wife. The snake prince's father reads the letter and does nothing. More false letters are sent, and the king, in tears, shows their contents to the princess. She decides to leave the palace and wander the world, due to the sins she bears. After wandering through the world, a cold night falls, and she finds herself among some graves. She discovers an open grave with a youth inside: twenty-year-old Mimikakliu, who only has a living mother and sister. His mother made a vow that she would not open her doors after her son died ten years ago.

Mimikakliu greets the girl and announces she is now his wife. After nine months, she is pregnant, and Mimikakliu directs her to his mother's yellow palace with a front garden, where she is to knock and ask for shelter since she is pregnant; after she does not answer at first, she is to reiterate the request in the name of Mimikakliu. The girl goes to Mimikakliu's mother's palace and does as instructed, but the woman refuses to open the door, until the girl mentions Mimikakliu's name. Now inside, she gives birth to a boy. Mimikakliu pays a visit to the girl in the middle of the night. He learns he has fathered a boy, and advises the girl to sing a song to their child that he is the son of Mimikakliu, and if his grandmother knew, she would make a golden cradle and a silken swaddle for him. By doing this, Mimikakliu's mother will move her and the child to his room, and he will return the following night.

The following night, the girl sings the lullaby to her child, and the old nurse hears it, then goes to inform Mimikakliu's mother about it. The woman comes to talk to the girl and moves her and the child to another room, then asks if Mimikakliu will appear, choosing to have faith that he will. Later, Mimikakliu comes in the middle of the night, and his mother hears his voice, confirming the girl's words. When the rooster crows, Mimikakliu says he must return to his friends, and vanishes. His mother enters the room and embraces the princess and the baby. The woman then asks the girl to find out from Mimikakliu how they can save him. When Mimikakliu returns a third time, the girl asks him how he can return to be with them during the day. Mimikakliu says that he is dead, but can be revived if his mother makes some preparations: she is to build a large "avorua" (a large wall surrounding the house) filled with glasses and razors from all the world, gather some walnuts, almonds, hazelnuts, and some wine for him, then boil some hashash for him to drink and pay no heed to the commotion outside.

The girl relays the information to Mimikakliu's mother and she sets herself to fulfill his instructions. At night, Mimikakliu appears to them, eats the fruits, and drinks the wine. The girl gives him the boiled hashash for him to drink and fall asleep. Outside, the dead ("vdekurit", in the original) begin to scream for Mimikakliu and make noise to wake him up, then hurt themselves in the glass and razors that surround the house and leave. When dawn comes, Mimikakliu wakes up and laments that his friends came to fetch him, but he is now with his family, his mother, his wife and his son. Mimikakliu takes the boy to play with him on the balcony.

Back to the snake prince, he returns from the war, cannot find his wife who restored him to human form, and asks his father about it. The king does not anything and shows him the falsified letters. The snake realizes his family was victim of a ploy and decides to look for the princess. He reaches Mimikakliu's house just as the youth is playing with his son and knocks on the door. Mimikakliu answers the door and the snake prince orders him to return his wife. Mimikakliu replies that the princess revived him and gave him a child. They dispute over the girl, when they decide to bring the matter to a third party: the girl is torn between the snake she made into a man and the youth that she revived and has a family with. The third party suggests they give her very salty food, and offer her water during a walk; whoever gives her water to drink shall be her husband. They do so and go for a walk; the girl begins to feel thirsty and asks for water. The snake prince gives her water, which marks her choice. Mimikakliu stays with their child, while the snake prince takes the princess back to his kingdom.

== Analysis ==
=== Tale type ===
The first part of the Albanian tale corresponds, in the international Aarne-Thompson-Uther Index, to tale type ATU 433B, "King Lindworm": a serpent (snake, or dragon) son is born to a king and queen (either from a birthing implement or due to a wish); years later, the serpent prince wishes to marry, but he kills every bride they bring him; a girl is brought to him as a prospective bride, and wears several layers of cloth to parallel the serpent's skins; she disenchants him. Tale type ATU 433B, "King Lindworm", is part of the cycle of the Animal as Bridegroom, stories that involve a human maiden marrying a prince in animal form and disenchanting him.

=== Motifs ===
==== The snake husband ====
The snake is a symbol of fertility in Albanian folklore, represented by both female and male characters in Albanian folktales. In that regard, a snake may marry a human maiden and reveal himself to be a youth under the snakeskin after the marriage, but in some stories the burning of his snakeskin causes his death.

Scholar Jan-Öjvind Swahn, in his work about Cupid and Psyche and other Animal as Bridegroom tales, described that the King Lindworm tales are "usually characterized" by the motifs of "release by bathing" and "7 shifts and 7 skins". Similarly, according to Birgit Olsen, "in most versions" the heroine is advised by her mother's spirit to wear many shifts for her wedding night with the lindworm prince.

==== The heroine's dilemma ====
In some tales, in the second part of the story, the heroine is calumniated and expelled from home, then meets youths in the shape of birds whom she disenchants; later, the snake husband finds her at the bird youth's castle or a dead man's house and a test is set to decide which husband she is to be with. According to Holbek and Lindow, this narrative was recorded from Southern Europe, Asia Minor, and Scandinavia. In the same vein, Swedish scholar Waldemar Liungman noted that the heroine, in the second part of the tale, is torn between a first and second husbands, and chooses the first - a dilemma that occurs "both in the Nordic as well as in variants from Eastern and Southeastern Europe". As for the nature of the second husband, he is a man cursed to be dead in the latter, while in the former region he is a prince in bird form or a man who has a contract with the Devil. In that regard, according to Albanian scholars Jorgo Panajoti, Agron Xhagolli and Albert Doja, the motif of the dead that is revived for some reason (violation of the grave, love, faith, great concern, etc.) is "quite well known" in Albanian folk poetry and prose.

== Variants ==
=== The Snake and the Dead Man ===
In an Albanian tale collected from a source in Prezë with the title Gjarupni dhe i vdekuni ("The Snake and the Dead Man"), an old couple has no children. One day, the old man goes to the forest to fetch firewood and finds a snake on the ground and tries to kill it, but the snake begins to talk and asks to be taken by the man to his house and treated as his son. The man brings the firewood and the snake coiled around his arm home, to his wife's worry. The old woman cries for her husband to kill the snake, but the reptile asks to be their son. The old couple raise the snake son until he becomes larger. One day, the snake son asks the old man to marry him, but the old couple question who would want to marry a snake. The reptile then points to a "filonit" with three daughters, one of which could be his bride. The old man goes to the filonit's town and finds the family of his prospective bride: a widower with three daughters. The old man tells the filonit about the talking snake and he decides to marry one of his daughters to the animal. On the wedding night, the snake appears to the bride and demands her to remove her clothes, but she is so afraid of the snake the reptile kills her. The next morning, the snake's parents go to inform the filonit his daughter died. The snake son asks for another filonit's daughter, who marries the snake and suffers the same fate. Finally, he asks for the third daughter, who is given to him as his newest bride. The girl asks to wear forty layers of clothes and goes to meet her snake husband. On the wedding night, the snake asks the girl to undress herself, but the girl replies to the snake he must remove a layer first. They keep removing their own layers, and the snake turns into a handsome youth. The girl takes the layers of snakeskin and burns them in a fire, to the now human snake youth's objection. Still, the snake has become human and lives with the girl as his bride. However, the girl's stepmother, knowing of her stepdaughter's fortunate marriage, begins to plot the girl's downfall. She invites the stepdaughter back home, and the snake prince allows her to go. Back home, the woman takes the stepdaughter for a walk in the forest, and the girl falls asleep. The woman abandons the girl in the forest and goes back home.

The girl wakes up, finds herself lost in the woods and realizes her stepmother tricked her, so she wanders out of the forest until she finds a pair of graves on the road. Suddenly, one of the graves starts to shake, and the girl, trembling with fear, pleads with the spirit that if they are a woman, she will be her mother; if a man, her father; if a boy, her brother; if a girl, her sister. The grave opens up and out comes a youth, who died that same night and was survived by his mother. The dead man and the girl talk, the dead man directs her to a house where she can spend the night, where she is to ask to open the door and call on the name of Sulejmonit, who broke the lady of the house's heart that night, for her to given entry. The girl does as instructed and knocks on Sulejmonit's mother's house, then mentions Sulejmonit's name and how he broke her heart tonight. Sulejmonit's mother questions how the girl learned that name and how she knows about her son, but lets her in. After a year of the girl living in Sulejmonit's house, she gives birth to a son and rocks the child with a song that mentions that the child is Sulejmonit's son. Sulejmonit's mother hears the song and complains to the girl how she dares to pronounce dead Sulejmonit's name, but the girl reveals the baby is indeed Sulejmonit's, who comes to her every night, so, if his mother wishes to see him, she is to silence every animal, the chickens, the donkeys, and wait by the door. It happens thus, and Sulejmonit appears at three o'clock in the night to talk to the girl. When he is about to leave, his mother grabs him, but he tells her to let go, since he does not belong to her. However, he gives her instructions on how to save him: she is to go to the washroom, wash a piece of wool and tell herself, Sulejmoni's mother, to cry, then the angels ("Meleqet") will appear with buckets to fill with her tears; the angels will ask her to forgive them, but she is to deny them and keep crying until they release Sulejmon. With this, he disappears, and his mother sets herself to the task of rescuing her son. The following night, she takes a piece of wool to the washroom and cries over it, when the angels appear with buckets to fill it with water and ask her to cease crying. Sulejmoni's mother denies their request until they forgive Sulejmoni, then she will release them. The angels promise to forgive Sulejmoni and release him, then depart. When morning comes, Sulejmoni is alive and with his mother.

Sulejmoni's mother is happy for her son's return due to the presence of the girl she let in the house one night, and decides to marry her to her son. Sulejmoni has a grand wedding that even the snake prince is invited to. During the celebrations, the girl, his wife, comes to serve him and he recognizes her as his wife. Sulejmoni and his mother are stunned with this information, and Sulejmoni insists that she is his wife and the reason he is even alive in the first place. The snake prince and Sulejmon meet and argue over who has any right over the girl, since she disenchanted the snake to human form and revived Sulejmoni. They argue the question loudly, when the people say they will judge and settle the question: they blindfold their common wife and place a jar of water in her hand, for her to give to the one she chooses as her true husband, then make the snake and Sulejmoni trade places to confuse the girl. They send the girl into the room, and she gives the jar of water to Sulejmoni. The people reach a conclusion: the girl is Sulejmoni's wife, after all. With this, the snake spins in the room, then vanishes in anger, while Sulejmoni lives with the girl and their son. Albanian collectors and scholars Jorgo Panajoti, Agron Xhagolli and Albert Doja noted that the story was a variant of the Albanian tale Mimikakliu.

== See also ==
- The Dragon-Prince and the Stepmother
- The Girl With Two Husbands (Greek fairy tale)
- Dragon-Child and Sun-Child (Armenian tale)
- The Fisherman's Daughter
- The Serpent Prince, or the Woman with Two Husbands
- Champavati (Indian tale)
- The Enchanted Snake (Italian tale)
- The King of the Snakes
- The Story of the Hamadryad
- The Origin of the Sirenia
