= Muchie-Lal =

Indian folktale

Muchie-Lal is an Indian folktale published by author Mary Frere, who collected it from her maid Anna Liberata de Souza. It tells the story of a girl that marries a prince in fish form and disenchants him with supernatural aid. It is related to the international cycle of the Animal as Bridegroom, in that a human maiden marries a man cursed into animal form and breaks his curse. Variants are collected in Southern India and from the Dravidian languages, with the male protagonist taking many animal shapes, like that of a fish, a crab or a tiger.

== Source ==
Mary Frere collected the tale from her Indian maid Anna Liberata de Souza, and published it originally in 1868. Stith Thompson and Jonas Balys's Oral Tales of India sourced the tale from Mysore.

== Publications ==
The tale was republished in English as Little Ruby Fish (Murchie-Lal), and The Fish Prince (where the heroine is named Balna). The tale was also translated into German as Muchie Lal and to Russian with the title "Царевич-рыба" ("Prince-Fish").

== Summary ==
A Rajah and a Ranee suffer for not having children, and pray to be given a son, to no avail. One day, fishes are brought to the kitchen to be cooked, and one of the maidservants notices there is a single living among them. She places the little animal in a basin, which the Ranee sights one day and decides to adopt it as her pet, calling it "Muchie-Rajah" ('Fish-Prince'). As the fish grows up, the queen replaces his basin for increasingly larger recipients, until the fish is large enough to occupy a tank. The story then explains the fish was no ordinary animal, but a prince transformed into a fish due to the gods' anger.

Some time later, the fish begins to talk and asks the Ranee to search for a wife for him, since he is lonely. The Ranee then sends messengers to search for a maiden to be the fish's wife, the Muchie-Ranee, but many families refuse to give up their daughters to the fish prince for feart of it devouing them. The Ranee then offers a lac of gold mohurs as compensation for the daughter of any family to come marry the fish. People still refuse to accept the Ranee's proposal, even the beggars. Eventually, the messengers reach a village where a widowed Fakeer lives with his biological daughter, a second wife and his stepdaughter. The Fakeer's second wife hates the man's daughter and wishes to get rid of her for fear of overshadowing her own daughter, so, when the Fakeer is out one day and the messengers inform of the Ranee's search, the woman accepts the lac and gives her stepdaughter as wife to the fish, believing the animal will devour her.

The woman orders her stepdaughter, the Fakeer's daughter, to wash her saree in the river and prepare to go with the messenger and marry the fish prince. The girl cries for her fate near he river, and a seven-headed cobra appears to her. The girl confides in the cobra her problems, and the reptile advises her to take three pebbles with her, for her to cast whenever the fish comes up he surface to stop him from eating her. With the cobra's advice, the girl goes to the palace and is moved out to a room near the fish prince's tank. The fish prince emerges for air and the girl throws a pebble at him: the first two times, the fish sink to the bottom of the tank; the third pebble reverts him to human form. The now human fish prince explains the girl released him from the spell, then asks if she wants to become the Muchie-Ranee.

The next morning, people are surprised to see the fish has not devoured the girl; instead, there are a couple, the prince and the Fakeer's daughter. The monarchs marries their son to the girl, and they live in happiness for a while. However, the Fakeer's second wife learns of her stepdaughter's successful match and pretends to be happy for her. His stepdaughter, who has become Ranee, asks her husband to return home and visit has family. The stepmother seizes the opportunity to feign goodwill and instructs her own daughter to deal with her stepsister and become the Ranee in her place: the girl takes the Ranee to the riverbank, trades jewels with her and shoves her down the water to drown. As the stepsister returns home, the Ranee is saved by the Seven-Headed Cobra and taken to safety in his lair, where the Cobra lives with his cobra family.

The Fakeer's wife takes her daughter to Muchie-Rajah to pass her as the true Ranee, but he notices something strange about her for the first two days. On the third day, he pulls the jewels from the false wife, his stepsister-in-law, and banishes her, while he ordes the Fakeer's wife to be captured, but she evades. As for the true Muchie-Ranee, down in the Cobra's hole, she gives birth to a son she calls Muchie-Lal, after his father. When the boy is three years old, a bangle-seller passes by the hole and the Muchie-Ranee buys some from the seller for Muchie-Lal. However, the boy breaks the bangles during his playtime, so his mother has to buy new ones to replace it, making the bangle-seller very rich.

As time passes, the Muchie-Ranee begins to miss her husband and asks the Seven-Headed Cobra if she can leave and rejoin with her husband, but the Cobra insists she stays with them for her own protection. As for Muchie-Rajah, he has spent quite some time in search of his wife, but has no clue about her whereabouts. One day, he meets the bangle-seller, who tells him about the people who live in the Cobra's hole by the riverbank. Curious, the prince asks the bangle-seller about the people (a mother and her son, Muchie-Lal), then requests to be taken there. After resting for a whole day, the prince and the bangle-seller arrive at the Cobra's hole and find a biy playing with the young cobras.

A voice comes from the hole, calling for Muchie-Lal, and prince Muchie-Rajah recognizes it is his wife's voice. The prince calls into the well for his wife, and she tells him about the ruse her stepfamily played on him and their attempt on her life. Muchie-Rajah says he has come to bring her home, and Muchie-Ranee informs the Cobras about it. The Seven-Headed Cobra allows Muchie-Ranee to return home with her husband and son, but the cobra will miss them, and gives the family as a parting gift costly gifts.

== Analysis ==
=== Tale type ===
The tale is part of the cycle of the Animal as Bridegroom, wherein the heroine marries a wild animal that she disenchants into human form. Stith Thompson and Warren Roberts approximated the Indian tale to tale type AaTh 433B, "King Lindworm", of the international Aarne-Thompson-Uther Index.

According to Kannada scholars, the story of the "Crab Prince" ("ಏಡಿಕುಮಾರನ ಕಥೆ", in the original), is "popular" in Karnataka and classified as type 433B ("ವರ್ಗ ೪೩೩ ಬಿ", in the original). In the Kannada tales, the queen sights a female crab with its young and sighs over not having a son. She becomes pregnant and gives birth to a crab (a fish or a snake, in other variants), which grows up and demands a wife, lest he destroys the village. A stepmother sends one of her stepdaughters in exchange for a bride price as the crab prince's wife. She dies in the same night. After killing the first bride, he demands another, and the stepmother sends her other stepdaughter. The second girl cries for her sister's fate, when Shiva and Parvati give her some magical stones she can use on the crab prince to disenchant him. In some tales, the crab prince has killed many brides before his disenchantment. After turning to human form, the Crab Prince's wife's stepmother pays her a visit under the false pretenses of helping the girl in her delivery, shoves her inside a well and replaces her for her own daughter. The pregnant heroine falls inside the well and helps a snake, which welcomes her in the well. She gives birth to the Crab Prince's son inside the well. The prince notices his wife looks different, and a bangle seller finds the princess inside the well, then reports to the Crab Prince. The Crab Prince rescues his wife and son from the well and punishes the stepmother and her daughter.

According to scholar A. K. Ramanujan, in stories titled "The Crab Prince" (edikumāra) or "The Fish Prince" (mīnakumāra), the heroine is sold or given to an animal bridegroom that she disenchants and teaches to be a loving husband.

=== Motifs ===
The tale contains the motif B603, "Marriage to fish (whale)", and D170, "Transformation: man to fish".

== Variants ==
=== Tales about fishes ===
==== The Fish Prince (East India) ====
In a tale sourced to East India with the title The Fish Prince, a king and queen have two sons, one one-eyed and dwarf in size, and the other tall and handsome. The king favours the other son instead of the one-eyed prince, named Deesa, who is outraged by this and complains to his wife Mitna. Mitna has sorcerous powers and plots with Deesa to get rid of the other prince. She climbs a balcony and drops a powder on the other prince, turning him into a fish which swims away from his father's kingdom, until he is caught by a group of fishermen and brought to another king's palace to be cooked. However, one of the servants decides to spare the fish and presents it to the queen. The childless queen decides to adopt the fish and take care of it as a son, which she calls Athon-Rajah, the Fish Prince. The Fish Prince grows up and eventually is moves out to a tank large enough to house him. One day, the queen asks the fish, and he answers he would like to find a wife. The queen agrees to find him a wife, orders the building of a room for her next to the tank, then sends messengers to find a maiden for the prince, offering a bag of gold as dowry. However, rumors spread that the Fish Prince wants a wife to devour her, and many families refuse to give up their daughters. Eventually, a poor fakir decides to send his daughter by his first wife to be married to the prince, a decision also agreed upon by her stepmother and the fakir's second wife. The fakir is paid the bag of gold and directs the queen's messengers to the river margin, where the girl, named Maya, is. Maya learns of the proposal and, in tears, is guided to the queen for wedding preparations. Before she is married to the prince, Maya asks the queen for a last favour: to visit her old friend by the river, a seven-headed cobra she has known since childhood. The queen allows Maya a visit and the girl meets the cobra. The girl explains the situation and the seven-headed cobra tells her to pick up three pebbles near its hole and throw each of the pebbles against the fish prince if he emerges from its tank in order to restore him to human form, for he is an enchanted prince. Maya returns to the palace and is placed in the room adjacent to the fish's tank. The Fish Prince approaches her with an open mouth, and Maya casts the first pebble into his mouth, causing him to sink to the bottom of the tank. He recovers his bearings and goes near the girl, who casts the second pebble against his head, then the third pebble against his fin. This turns the fish back into the human form. The now human prince marries Maya and they live in happiness.

==== The Fish Prince (Betta Kurumba) ====
In a tale from the Betta Kurumba language, translated as The Fish Prince, there live a prince and a minister, the minister with a child and the prince childless. The prince worries for his lineage, and his wife cries for not having children. One time, she drinks water directly from a tank, and becomes pregnant, although she only senses her pregnancy as it approaches labour. She gives birth to a fish as her son, which was granted by Narayan (the Betta Kurumba word for 'God'). The fish son grows up and lives in a water tank, having to change tanks as it grows older, until his parents place him in a separate house. One day, the fish prince asks his parents to find him a wife, although the royal parents worry that no maiden will want to marry one. Their concerns are founded, as they search high and low in many cities for a bride, and are told by families they will not give their daughters to a fish. Eventually, they find a stepmother with two stepdaughters, one thin, which they bring to the fish. The girl is groomed and bathed before going to meet her husband, and cries. Narayan (Shiva) and his wife pass by and ask the girl what is the matter. The girl confides in the divine couple she will become the fish prince's bride, and Narayan gives her three pills to be thrown at the fish: one at the mouth, the second at the body, and the third at the tail. The girl gets the pills and goes to meet the fish. However, she is swallowed overnight by the fish. The next day, the fish prince asks his parents to find him another bride, and they go to the stepmother to fetch the younger sister. The younger sister goes near the river, and Narayan appears to her. The deity gives her three pills to throw at the fish prince's body after she wakes up. The second girl is brought to the fish as his bride and they both go to sleep. Some time during the night, the girl wakes up and finds the prince near her, so she takes the pills and tosses them at the prince: the first in his mouth, the second at his back, and the third at his tail. A blinding flash of light appears in the room, as the fish prince becomes a prince in human form, so dazzling is his countenance. The now human prince controls his powers and reveals his human form to the bride. The girl and the prince marry.

==== The Fish-Boy and His Wife ====
Professor Stuart Blackburn collected a tale from a Tamil informant named Velliyamma, from Melalavu, Madurai District. In this tale, titled The Fish-Boy and His Wife, a poor fisherman and his wife have seven sons they struggle to feed, and decide to abandon them, but first they ask them what they will do to earn their living. Each of the older boys answers they will find a profession or a job, save for the youngest, who will find something to do. One day, while he is fishing in the sea, he catches a fish and tries to place it in a basket, but is swallowed by it and lodges himself inside the animal. A man finds the fish and sells it to the raja's house. The raja's cook sets the fish to be cooked, but the boy inside it answers he wants some rice. The raja is surprised by the event, but feeds it. The boy inside the fish also asks to have a bath, and they leave some soap and oils to it. Some time later, the boy grows up inside the fish, and they try to cut it up again, but the boy asks not to be cut up. Eventually, he asks to be married to a bride, but the raja questions who would marry a fish-son. They search every village, until they find a bangle-seller, his wife and two daughters, one by his late co-wife and a second by the living one. The man's wife says they give her elder stepdaughter to the fish, and are paid. The girl is brought to the fish-son, who asks for rice and a drink. The girl gives some, he removes the fishskin to eat the meal, and returns to it. Later, Siva meets the girl and advises her to feed the fish husband some rice, then tap him with a wand; the second time tap twice, and the third time tap it three times. One day, the girl suspects there is something human-like about him, and plans to discover what it is. The next time she feeds him some rice, she follows Siva's instructions and taps him with a wand. On another occasion, when he goes to take a bath, the girl discovers the fish-son removes his fishskin to bathe, fetches it and tosses it in the fire, keeping him human. The girl's family pays her a visit and discovers her living a luxurious life, and the stepmother laments she did not set up her own daughter with the fish son. So she offers to welcome her stepdaughter back home, since she is pregnant. The boy agrees to her return home with her family, but, suspecting something, asks his wife to place her handprint on a wall with sandal paste, exchange rings with her, and hide some clothes for when she returns.

The fish son's wife returns home, bedecked with jewels and dresses. Her stepmother asks her daughter to join the girl in fetching water and trading jewels with her. As soon as the girls reach the well, the girl is shoved inside the well by her stepsister, who dons her clothes and jewels and goes back to the fish son. The fish son notices the ring on her is not a match, and asks the false wife to touch the handprint, which also does not match his true wife's one. He notices the girl is not his wife, but keeps quiet about it. As for the true wife, the girl gives birth to a son in the well and is taken care of by a snake. In return, she helps it feed its snake young by heating some milk and letting it cool. One day, another bangle-seller peddles his wares, and the girl, from the bottom of the well, asks the bangle-seller for some bangles. The bangle-seller goes down the well and sells some bangles to the fish son's child. Back to the fish son, he realizes his wife is missing, replaced by her stepfamily, then is visited by the bangle-seller, who tells him he sold some wares to a woman and her child in the well. The fish son realizes his wife is alive and at the well and asks to be taken there, but first digs up a hole, shoves the false wife in and orders people to excrete and defecate on her head, lest they be hanged. The false wife's mother visits the raja again and is forced to defecate on her own daughter. She realizes it is her daughter on the pit, removes her and takes her to a river to wash away the filth, to no avail. A washerwoman advises the mother to grab her daughter's legs and arms and hit against a rock. It happens thus, and the stepdaughter's head splits open.

Back to the fish son, the bangle-seller takes him to the snake well, and ropes the girl up with a black cow's aid. The fish son and his wife reunite, and the girl asks him to wait for the snake-father to bid him goodbye. The snake-father appears and poses to strike, but the girl explains this is her husband. The snake understands it, but asks the girl to feed its young one last time. However, in a hurry, she forgets to cool the milk, and the snakelings eat it and die. The snake father promises to take revenge on her and visits the fish son's house. The animal listens to the girl's lullaby, which rocks the son by mentioning the snake who took her in. Feeling sorry for the mistake, the snake hits its head at the door and kills itself. The next day, the girl finds the dead snake, thanks it for taking care of her, and places the dead body inside a box. After a month, the girl opens the box: the snake is alive and gives her a pearl as a memento. The fish son makes his wife confirm her identity by showing the ring, placing her hand on the handprint, and taking the hiddden change of clothes.

==== The Tale of a Fish (Tulu) ====
In a tale collected from Tulu Nadu with the title Mīnuda Kate and translated as The Tale of a Fish, a king is childless and his queen is mocked for some perceived barrenness, worrying about his lack of heirs. One day, a Beary man appears at the kingdom to sell fish, and the king buys one for his wife. The queen eats the fish, becomes pregnant and gives birth to a fish-child, which she throws inside a well. As time passes, the fish prince grows larger in the well and utters a wish that his parents find him a wife, lest he swallows them. The queen overhears her son's wishes everytime she goes to fetch water, but does not tell the king. One day, during a picnic, the queen reveals to the king about their fish son's wishes, and the king questions her who would want to marry a fish, but, begrudingly, decides to fulfill his son's request and takes a thousand rupees and departs. He reaches the house of a family of motherless seven sisters who live with their father and stepmother. The man wants to protect his daughters, but the stepmother says they have girls to spare, so they should take the money and give up one daughter for the fish. The girl is brought to the palace, bedecked and adorned, and swallowed by the fish son. The next day, the fish prince demands a bride. The king goes to the same family, and buys off the second elder daughter, who is also devoured by the fish son. This happens to the next four daughters, until there is only the youngest left. The youngest girl cries for her potential fate, and goes to her mother's grave for comfort. Meanwhile, deities Isvara and Parvati listen to the girl's woes, and descend on their aerial carriage. The girl tells the pair about her possible death, and goddess Parvati helps her: she asks for three pebbles, on which she utters some incantations, and on another four pebbles, then gives her a blessing for her future marriage. The girl returns home to her parents, who surrender her daughter to the king. The youngest girl is presented and ready for her fish bridegroom, who comes out of the well to devour her. The girl then tosses a pebble at him, removing his scales; then the second, commanding him to become a boy of sixteen; then a third, turning him into a man. She takes the rest of the pebbles and throws them, creating a palace and wealth for them. The king and queen find their son, now human, in the newly-created palace, and rejoice in his union.

Sometime later, the stepmother learns of her stepdaughter's fortunate marriage and laments that she did not give her own daughter to the fish prince. Still, both girls become pregnant in time, and the stepmother goes to her stepdaughter's new palace to help her fulfill her pregnancy cravings, promising to take her back home. The woman passes by the Seven Hills, captures a large serpent and hides it in a pot, then tricks her stepdaughter to place her hand in the pot, saying it contains rice for her. Inside the pot, the girl's middle finger touches the snake, which has had a large throat boil for twenty-four years, and cures it of the boil. In return, the snake promises to help whoever cured it, and slithers off. The stepmother finds that her first attempt failed. The girl gives birth to a son, and the stepmother enacts another plan: to bathe her stepdaughter in boiling water. The girl finds the pot of boiling water and cries out that her stepmother plans to kill her, lamenting that the serpent did not finish the job. Suddenly, the serpent appears and carries her to its palace. The girl is safe for now, and requests the serpent brings the fish prince's son to her. It happens thus. Meanwhile, the stepmother places her own daughter and grandchild, a girl, in the other's place to trick the monarchs, but they notice that their grandson was male.

Back to the real fish prince's wife, a bangle-seller passes by the serpent's palace peddling his wares. The princess does not wish to buy bangles, but is convinced by the serpent king and takes the seller in. The bangle-seller climbs up a rope and meets the princess, who is singing a song to her son, calling him the "grandson of the serpent-king" and "son of the fish-king". The bangle-seller then passes by the fish-king's palace and the false wife wishes to buy some. The seller enters the palace and sees the other girl call out for her child, calling her "child of the fish-prince". The bangle-seller remembers the girl at the serpent-king's palace and her similar words towards her own child, calling the boy "son of the fish-king". The fish-king realizes the words must have been said by his true wife and asks the bangle-seller where he heard them and how to reach the place. The next day, the fish-prince passes by the bangle-seller's house, dons a disguise as a seller and reaches the serpent-king's palace, peddling his wares. The serpent-king pulls out a string-ladder and welcomes him in. The princess calls out to her son, calling him "son of the fish-king", and the fish-prince asks the serpent-king where the girl and the son came from. The serpent-king reveals the stepmother's failed attempts, and the fish-prince doffs his disguise to reunite with his wife and child, then asks the serpent-king to vanish the palace. Back at his own palace, the fish-prince organizes a feast for the return of his true wife and son, digs up a pit, places the false wife in and tells people to defecate on the pit. The false wife's father and mother come to the feast and defecate on the pit, and the girl complains to her mother from inside the pit. The woman (the princess's stepmother) rescues her daughter and takes her to a river to wash her, but cannot remove the excrement accumulated in the girl's ears. A toddy-tapper up a palm tree advises the woman to grab her daughter by the legs and beat her head against a rock to cleanse the ears. It happens thus, but the girl dies and her brains spill out. The woman then, per the toddy-tapper's next instructions, lays her daughter's body by the middle of the river and runs back, for the girl would follow her. However, the river washes away the girl's body.

=== Tales about crabs ===
==== The Crab King (Sadar) ====
In a tale titled "ಏಡಿರಾಜನ" ("ēḍirājana"; English: "Crab King"), collected from a Sadar Lingayat source, a king and a queen are childless. One day, the queen walks by the lake with her handmaidens and sees many animals in the water, wishing to have a son just like one of them. She returns home and asks her husband if they could ask the deity for a child. Thus, nine months later, a crab is born to the queen, whom they call Adi Kumaran and place inside a bowl. As the crab son grows up, they have to move him to larger and larger bowls, until the king has an entire pool made for him. Later, the crb prince asks he wants to get married, and the monarchs, despite the surprise, offer a reward of ten thousand varahs to any girl who wishes to marry the crab prince. The king's minister go from house to house until they find a woman with a daughter and a stepdaughter. Wishing to be paid handsomely, the woman sends her own daughter first to marry the crab prince. The crab prince kills her on the wedding night. The following day, the crab prince demands another bride, and this time the woman sends her stepdaughter. The girl is afraid for her life and goes to cry near the river, when deities Shiva and Parvati approach her. Shiva gives her a speckle of salt, a piece of coal and a grain of pepper, for her to throw on the crab prince when he comes to the surface and tries to devour her. The girl does as Shiva instructs and disenchants the prince to human form, to his parents' happiness. The girl's stepmother learns of her stepdaughter's fortune and decide to take revenge on her and the prince, for her own daughter's death: she prepares some curry with poison and goes to the palace to greet her stepdaughter, who has given birth to a boy. The princess avoids the poisoned meal when her cat has eaten it. Later, the stepmother resorts to another plan: after the new princess decides to return home with her child, the stepmother agrees to accompany her, then shoves both down a pit and douses mother and son with scalding hot water. However, the hot water never touches them, but a snake inside the hollow. The snake, called Nagaraja, promises to protect mother and son, and takes cares of the young prince. Back to the Crab Prince, the stepmother places an imposter to pretend to be the princess, but he notices it due to his real wife wearing a golden sari and a golden comb, which the imposter does not wear. So he decides to search for his true wife: he goes on a hunt and stops next to the hollow. Inside the hollow, the Crab Prince's son begins to cry and the princess sings a song to calm him down, mentioning the baby is the Crab Prince's son and raised by the Serpent King. The Crab Prince overhears the song and rescues his wife and child from the hollow, then thanks the snake king for his help. The Crab Prince confronts the false wife and asks her to comb her hair with the golden pin and golden comb, but she does not know of them. The real princess finds them, thus proving the stepmother's plot. The Crab King then orders the execution of his wife's stepmother and her accomplice, and lives happily with his wife and son.

==== Story of the Crab Prince ====
In a Kannada tale titled "ಏಡಿಕುಮಾರನ ಕಥೆ" ("Story of the Crab Prince"), collected by folklorist H. L. Nagegowda from a source named Lakshamma in Karnataka, in the city of Chunchanagiri, a king is already married to a queen for twelve years, and yet they have sired no heir yet, to his worry. A spiritual guide suggests the king builds a lake for the people and cattle to drink water, for Gangamma, and the queen is to go there, find a pregnant crab and be bitten by it, and she shall have a child. It happens thus, and queen gives birth to a crab they name Ediraja. The monarchs worry for their son, but still look after the boy and place him in a bowl. When he is fifteen or sixteen years old, he wishes to find a bride, a decision also spurred on by some children that come to see the crab prince. The prince's servant transmits the crab's wish, and he offers to find him a bride: he takes a cow loaded with gold and finds a family of a man and his two daughters, his wife and her daughter. They send the woman's daughter in exchange for the money as bride price, who is given to the crab prince. He eats her.

Some time later, the crab prince asks for another bride, and his servant goes to the same family, this time taking the man's daughter to a room net to the prince's chambers. She is afraid, for her stepsister has not returned, and goes to cry in a hill in the forest near for Shiva and Sita. Shiva and Parvati hear her lamentations, Parvati wanting to investigate and Shiva dismissive of them. Both deities come to Earth and meet the girl, who explains them the situation about the crab prince. Shiva gives her a handful of sand for her to throw at the crab prince the first time, and a branch for the second time, which will restore him to human form. The girl returns to the palace and goes to the prince's chambers: when he lunges forward, she tosses the sand at him, causing him to dance, then throws the branch, turning him to human form. The monarchs worry for another girl falling victim to the giant crustacean, but the prince's servant comes and announces he is now fully human. A kingdom-wide celebration is held as the now human crab prince marries her liberator.

In time, the new princess becomes pregnant with Ediraja's child. Her stepmother decides to pay her a visit with her other daughter under false pretenses, and plots a way to get rid of her: she takes her for a walk near a well, asks her to trade clothes with her stepsister and draw some water for them, then tosses the princess inside the well to die, while she dresses her own daughter as the crab prince's wife. However, the girl is alive, for a den of snakes that live in the well rescues her. As for the false wife, she returns home and wraps up a stone to rock on the cradle to pretend she gave birth to Ediraja's child. Ediraja returns from his journey and notices his wife is looking different and questions her, but his stepmother-in-law says she had a difficult delivery and needs to rest, for the baby was stillborn. The prince falls for the trick, but notices the ruse after the false wife heals, by asking her where is the kitchen at their house and she cannot answer .

The prince sends a servant to a certain village with some bangles to sell, in hopes of finding his true wife. By passing by the well, the servant hears a voice coming from the well asking for some bangles. He utters a command for the well to part, descends into the snake den and gives some bangles to Ediraja's wife down in the well. He returns to Ediraja and reports that his wife is alive and down in the well with the snakes. Both return to the well and listen to the princess singing a song to calm her son, mentioning that he is the crab prince's son and adopted by the Nagaraj that lives in the well. The Edikumara realizes the voice belongs to his wife and goes down the well. He places a bangle on her, and takes her back to the surface. He confirms her identity by saying he gave her his ring, and she gave him a golden comb as a memento. The prince then banishes his stepmother-in-law and her daughter and lives with his wife and son.

==== "Munina's Wife" ====
In a South Indian tale from Gowda Kannada with the title "ಮೂನಿನ ಹೆಂಡತಿ - ತಂಗಿಯ ಮತ್ಸರ: ಹುಡುಗಿ ಮೊನನ್ನು" ("Munina's Wife - The girl is thrown in the well by her sister"), a king is childless and walks near a lake, where he finds a crab and its young, sighing that he has no children. A stranger comes and blesses him, predicting he will have a son. The queen gives birth to a crab and they raise the prince inside a lake. The animal prince grows up and wishes to get married. The monarchs find him a bride, who cries for her fate. However Shiva and Parvati appear to her, give her three magical stones for her to toss at the prince when he emerges to devour her. The girl takes three canes and the pebbles, then meets the prince. She tosses the stones and turns him to human form. They marry. Some time later, the girl wishes to visit her hometown, and her husband allows it. After a visit to her family, her stepsister walks with her near a lake and shoves her inside the lake. The girl survives inside the lake and helps a snake who had a boil for twelve years. The girl is also pregnant and gives birth to her and the prince's son, whom she calls Monukumar. The prince goes to look for his wife and, with the help of a bangle-seller, reunites with her and their child in the lake.

==== The King's Crab Son ====
In a tale sourced from the Konkani with the title "ಏಡಿರಾಜಪುತ್ರ" ("Edirajaputra"; English: "The King's Crab Son") or "ಏಡಿ ರಾಜಪುತ್ರನ ಕಥೆ" ("Ēḍi rājaputrana kathe"; "Story of Crab, King's Son"), a childless king and queen sigh for not having any children. They do penance as a way to be blessed with one, and a crab is born to them. The crab prince, however, desires human food as nourishment, but question where they can find such a sacrifice. A rich man's daughter is given by her stepmother as an offering to the crab prince, but Shiva and other deities bless the heroine and give her a stone which she is to throw at the prince's crab shell. The girl marries the crab prince and tosses the stone at his shell to disenchant him, turning the prince to human form. The now human crab prince and the girl marry. Some time later, the girl, pregnant, pays a visit to her stepfamily and father, is tricked by her stepmother and stepdaughter and shoved into a well, while her stepsister is sent back to the palace to fool the prince. Inside the well, the princess digs up a hole to reach the crab prince's palace and reunites with him. For their crime, the king punishes the princess's stepfamily.

=== Tales about tigers ===
==== The Tiger Prince (Bezwada) ====
Author M. N. Venkataswami collected a South Indian tale titled Puli Rája, or the Tiger Prince. In this tale, a king suffers for not having heirs, even after making vows, so his wife asks him to retire in the woods. The king retires with the minister. As for the queen, she finds a tigress in the forest and utters a wish for a son, even if he is a tigercub. Thus, one is born to her, called Puli Raja, the Tiger Prince. He lives in a cage, and, when he is older, asks his father to bring him a wife. The minister offers to fulfill the Tiger Prince's request, gets four bags of varas, and reaches an inn. He talks to the innkeeper about his search and the innkeeper offers his eldest daughter. An arrangement is made and the innkeeper's eldest daughter is brought to the king, but married to a knife. She is then delivered to the Tiger Prince's cage, who tears her to pieces. Next, the Tiger Prince asks for another bride, and the minister returns with even more money to the innkeeper. The innkeeper offer his youngest daughter as the second bride, and the girl is put on an elephant. On the road, the minister leaves the elephant to take a bath, while the girl is on the mount. She hears a group of women talking about the Tiger Prince's first bride, and she cries for a grisly fate. Deities Shiva and Parvati hear her cries and descend to comfort her. They give her a garland of kasinda flowers, a bowl of water and a handful of sand, which she is to use on the Tiger Prince: place the garland on his neck, sprinkle the sand and water on him and he will turn into a handsome youth. The girl supposes that the monarchs will want to see that the Tiger is their son, so the deities advise the girl to take out the garland, and he will return to tiger form. The girl is brought to the palace, taken to the tiger's cage. When he is ready to jump on her, she puts the garland on the tiger's neck, then sprinkles sand and water to make him human. They spend the night together, and the monarchs find the girl alive in the morning. The girl uses the garland on the Tiger Prince to show the monarchs the youth is their son, and they welcome her as their daughter-in-law.

Now a princess and pregnant, she is visited by an envious girl-cousin, who lies that the princess's mother wishes to see her. The princess accompanies her cousin, and they pass by a well. The cousin tricks the princess into looking at their reflections in the water of the well, trades jewels with her, then shoves the princess in the well. Inside the well, the princess falls onto a snake with a large boil, and cures her. In return, the snake takes the princess to Nagaloka, where she is taken in by the snake family and gives birth to her human son. As for the princess's cousin, she pretends to be the real princess to deceive the Tiger Prince, who suspects something at first, but relents in time and marries her, eventually fathering a son with the false wife. Back to the princess in Nagaloka, a bangle seller passes by the well peddling his wares and the princess calls from inside the well for some bangles. As the seller comes down the steps, he overhears the princess rocking her son with a song, calling the baby Venkayya, the tiger prince's son, who does not need a garland.

The bangle seller leaves the well and peddles his wares near the Tiger Prince's palace. The false princess asks for some. The seller enters the palace and notices the princess cursing the child, so he comments that he saw a woman in the Underworld rocking her son with a song, repeating the same song. The Tiger Prince overhears the seller repeating the verses, noticing the reference to the garland and realizing it is about his true wife. The prince then asks the seller to be taken to the well. The seller disguises the prince as a fellow bangle seller, and takes him to the well, peddling his wares again. The Tiger Prince's wife calls the seller again and rocks her crying son with the same verses. Puli Raja grabs his wife's hand and says he has come for her. The princess tells her adoptive snake father her husband has come for her, but the twelve-headed snake says that his snake wife will soon bear the snakelings, so the princess is to stay with them until she names them all. The snake wife gives birth to a brood of snakes, which the princess names. The last snakeling is called headless little Nagannah, which the little snake takes umbrage to, so he plots to bite the princess to death. The Tiger Prince rescues his wife and brings her to the palace, while the little snake hides in a melon. The prince prepares the execution of the false princess, while the true princess goes to wash herself and nurse the little baby, which blocks the little snake's attempts to bite her. Finally, the Tiger Prince plays chess with his true wife, who complains that she was the victor, on the name of their son, Chinna Nagannah. The little snake notices that the princess named the little snake like her own human son, comes out of the melon and reveals his plans. The princess welcomes the snake with a feast, then he returns to the underworld to his snake family. The Tiger Prince assumes the throne and lives happily with his wife and son. According to Venkataswami's preface, the tale was provided by his cousin named M. Venkatamma, from Bezwada.

==== Tiger Prince (Gowda Kannada) ====
In a South Indian tale from Gowda Kannada with the title "ಕೃತಜ್ಞ ಪ್ರಾಣಿ ಮತ್ತು ಮಲತಾಯಿ ಕಾಟ" ("The grateful animal and the stepmother's misfortune"), a king and a prime minister have no children. A brahmin appears and gives them a fruit to fulfill their wishes of having heirs. Their respective wives eat the fruit and have sons: the prime minister's is a normal human and the king's a tiger. They grow up together, and the prime minister's son marries, then the tiger prince wishes to find a bride. The monarch brings him brides, but he kills one by one. A girl is chosen as the tiger prince's seventh bride. Before she meets the prince, she helps a snake and is given a magical stone to disenchant the prince. It happens thus, and the now human tiger prince marries the girl. She becomes pregnant. The girl's stepsister throws her into a well at their house, and the girl falls into the Netherworld of Patala. When falling, she helps a snake that has been ill for 12 years, and is given shelter there. The tiger prince's wife gives birth to a boy whose body is golden in the upper parts and silver in the lower parts. The snake from Patala takes the princess and her son back to the human tiger prince.

==== Sher Sikander ====
In a Deccan tale titled Sher Sikander, in a kingdom in Gulistan, King Shehriyar and Queen Tehmina suffer for not having children. One day, the queen learns of a sage that has come to their realm with the means to cure the queen's barrenness. The queen requests a meeting with the sage, who gives her an apple imbued with herbs and instructions: share the apple with her husband, a half for each of them, and plaster the royal chambers with portraits of babies, so that she opens her eyes and focuses on the human babies. After nine months, the queen, pregnant, gives birth not to a child, but to a tiger cub. King Shehriyar asks the meaning of this and discovers a tiger's head just above the images of the babies, and deduces his wife must have seen after eating the apple. The king decides to kill the tiger cub, but queen Tehmina pleads on her son's behalf to spare him, for she will raise and feed him. Thus, the tiger prince, named Sher Sikander (sher meaning 'lion' or 'tiger'), is raised by his human mother. Years later, the tiger prince asks his mother to find him a bride. A maiden is brought to him, but she is devoured on the wedding night. This goes on with several maidens, as families surrender their daughters to the tiger prince for a bag of coins. After some months of bride-killing, queen Tehmina confronts her son about his madness and makes him promise that this will be the last time. The queen increases the worth of the bride price to five bags of gold coins, to draw poor families' attention. On the outskirts of Gulistan, a poor family of three, cobbler Kabeer, wife Marsha and daughter Tara, learn of the news. Marsha, Kabeer's second wife, hates her stepdaughter Tara and convinces her husband to send her as the tiger prince's bride and receive the money to improve their poor situation. Tara discovers her father and stepmother are sending her to die at the tiger's hands, and runs away from home in tears. She takes shelter in a cave, and laments her possible fate. Suddenly, and old man appears to comfort her, and promises there is a fortunate fate for her and the tiger prince. Tara does not believe him at first, but the old man gives her three stones doused with holy water, for her to use on the tiger prince. The old man takes Tara to the palace, where she is adorned and decorated and delivered to the prince. Queen Tehmina pities her, but goes through with the marriage. In the tiger prince's chambers, the tiger prepares to jump on the girl, when Tara throws a stone at him, restoring his legs to human form, then another at his torso, and lastly the third stone at his head, turning him human permanently. Sher Sikander, now human, tells everything to Tara. The next morning, queen Tehmina goes to check on her son and finds Tara besides a youth in bed. The youth reveals he was the tiger, but has been restored to human form by Tara and the holy man's intervention. King Shehriyar and the Queen rejoice their son is human, and Sher Sikander marries Tara in a great ceremony.

==== Come, o Keshari ====
Odishan folklorist Kunja Behari Das collected a tale from Odisha, titled "ଆ'ରେ ଆ'ରେ କେଶରୀ" ("Aare Aare Keshari" or Are Are Kesari; "Come, o Kesari" or "Come, o keshari"), a king is rich and has assets (cattle, animals, a garden), so much so it is said goddess Lakshmi smiled upon him. Yet, he wishes for a child. One evening, the queen takes a stroll in the forest and sees a tigress playing with its cubs, then wishes to have a child; if a human child is not her fate, then a tiger cub will suffice. Ten months later, the queen gives birth to a tiger cub, to the king's horror. The king worries for his cub son, since he eats raw meat and blood, and the minister advises the king to build a golden cage for him and draw him inside with a bowl. It happens thus, and the cub prince is placed in a cage. The tiger prince then asks his father to arrange him a wife, otherwise he will devour them. The minister tells the king he will travel far and wide and search for a girl as bride. The minister rides through valleys and forests and meets a Brahmin on the way, who asks him the reason for his journey. The minister explains he is searching for a bride for his king's son, and the Brahmin welcomes the man in his house, agreeing to send the prince one of his five daughters and paying the bride price. The minister takes the Brahmin's daughter with him, the priest bedecks with jewels and decorates her with turmeric and vermilion, then places her inside the tiger prince's cage. The tiger prince jumps at the girl, kills her and eats her raw.

After a year, the tiger prince demands another bride for him, repeating the same threat, and the minister is forced to return to the Brahmin's house for another girl. The minister takes another daughter, but this one cries for her possible fate, since she knows her elder sister was killed by the tiger bridegroom. The Brahmin's daughter reaches Shiva's temple and goes to pray for her fate, sleeping on the bare floor of the temple for days on end. Finally, Shiva and his consort hear the girl's cries one day, and his consort bids him investigate. They find the Brahmin girl in tears and comfort her about her problem: she is to be given to a tiger that may devour her. Shiva's consort gives the girl a root ("ଚେର", in the original), for the girl to wear in her hair, and a boon that no harm shall befall her. The girl returns to her father's house and accompanies the minister to the king's realm. The tiger prince is restless and questions his father about his next bride, when the minister brings the bride in for the ceremony. The king explains to the Brahmin girl that his son was born like an animal due to karma and his past actions, and they brought him a bride as he demanded, only to kill her inside the cage in the morning. The king delivers the bride to the tiger prince, and leaves, not wanting to witness her death. The Brahmin girl is afraid of dying, but calms herself by saying that she is protected by Ananta, so she will not be harmed. They open the cage and let the tiger prince out. He licks his lips and lunges at the second bride to attack her. As soon as his paws touch her neck, the magical root falls on his body. A transformation occurs: the tiger prince has changed to human form, a handsome youth. The now human tiger prince and his bride spend the night sharing joys and sorrows until the morning light.

In the morning, the guni ("magician" or "wise man") goes to check on the tiger prince, and finds an alive bride and the prince in human form inside the cage. The monarchs celebrate the human prince's marriage with his bride on an auspicious day. Sometime later, the king and the queen place their crowns on the now human prince and his wife, then dedicate their lives to asceticism ("Vanaprastha") in the forests. Months later, the new queen starts to long for her home, missing the simplicity of her mother's food and her humble lodgings, despite the poverty. The prince sends Sabai, the cowherd, to accompany her, and sets a date for her return in four days. The cowherd takes the new queen with him and her younger sisters in a palanquin. During the journey, the younger sister convinces the queen to remove her ornaments, like alka and a chandra-jhumpi, and let the younger sister wear them. They stop a pond to admire it; the younger sister shoves the queen in the water while the latter is watching some swans, then sits on the palanquin and orders the bearers to carry her home. As for the queen, she is sinking and floating in the water, and cannot find the bottom. Next to the pond, a sage that lives in an ashram sees the queen and uses his yogic powers to pull her to the bank, and rescues her. The sage lodges the queen in his ashram. Time passes, and she gives birth to the tiger prince's son, a human boy whom she names Keshari (Kesari). One day, the queen goes to the hermitage of Kacha, and bows to the local sage. The sage bids the woman let her son wear the kacha as well, so she summons her son with some verses, "Come, come, Keshari", mentioning that he is the son of the Baigurgi.

Back to the tiger king, he welcomes a caravan of bangle sellers for a meal. An artisan then starts to relate that they visited an ashram where a queen with a son in the exact likeness of the king; the queen called the boy forth as Keshari and sang some verses saying that he was the son of a king. The tiger king ponders about the mystery, and asks the artisans to lead him there and fashion some bangles for him. She reaches the ashram, trades his royal clothes for a bangle-seller's garb, and peddles the glass bangles. The queen bids the false seller come in, and he places bangles on her arm. He notices her face, and she calls for her son Keshari, saying that his father, the Maharaja, is there with them. The family is reunited, and the sage gives them his blessings. They return home, and the kingdom celebrates. The false queen feels ashamed that her ruse has been discovered. The king has a pit dug, logs thrown inside and lit on fire by cloths dowsed in oil, and the false queen is thrown inside.

== See also ==
- King Lindworm (ATU 433B)
- The Stepdaughter and the Black Serpent (ATU 433B)
- The Dragon-Prince and the Stepmother (ATU 433B)
- The Girl with Two Husbands (ATU 433B)
- Dragon-Child and Sun-Child (ATU 433B)
- Champavati (AaTh 433C)
- The Story of the Hamadryad (AaTh 433C)
- The Origin of the Sirenia (Cambodian folktale) (AaTh 433C)
- The Turtle Prince (folktale)
- Animal as Bridegroom
- The Enchanted Brahmin's Son
