= Jewish folklore =

Jewish folklore are legends, music, oral history, proverbs, jokes, popular beliefs, fairy tales, stories, tall tales, and customs that are the traditions of Judaism. Folktales are characterized by the presence of unusual personages, by the sudden transformation of men into beasts and vice versa, or by other unnatural incidents. A number of aggadic stories bear folktale characteristics, especially those relating to Og, King of Bashan, which have the same exaggerations as have the lügenmärchen of modern German folktales.

== Middle Ages ==
There is considerable evidence of Jewish people bringing and helping spread West Asian folktales throughout Europe. Besides these tales from foreign sources, Jews either collected or composed others which were told throughout the European ghettos, and were collected in Yiddish in the "Maasebücher". Numbers of the folktales contained in these collections were also published separately. It is, however, difficult to call many of them folktales in the sense given above, since nothing fairy-like or supernormal occurs in them.

== Legends ==
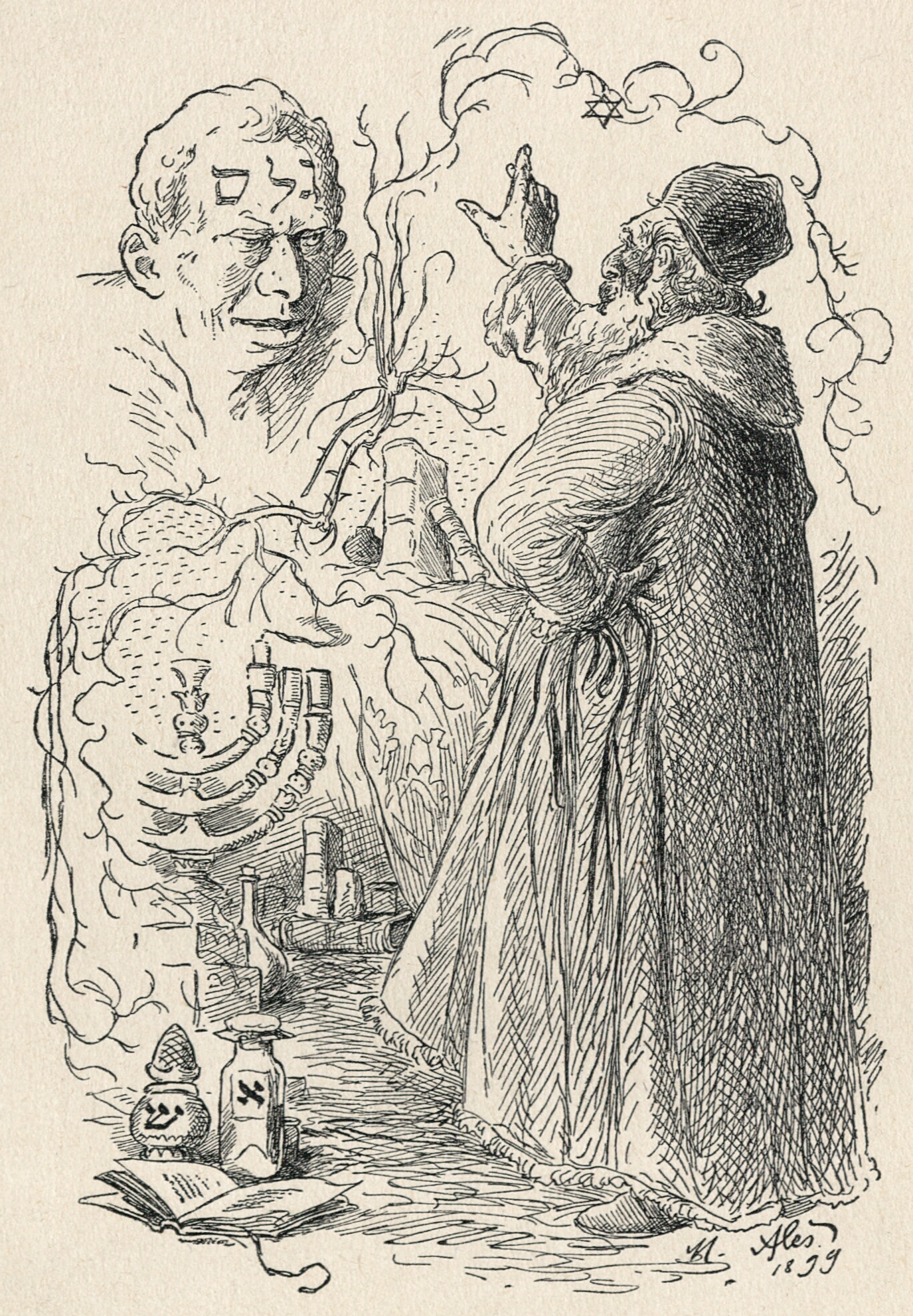
Rabi Loew and Golem by Mikoláš Aleš (1899).

There are a few definitely Jewish legends of the Middle Ages which partake of the character of folktales, such as those of the Jewish pope Andreas and of the golem, or that relating to the wall of the Rashi chapel, which moved backward in order to save the life of a poor woman who was in danger of being crushed by a passing carriage in the narrow way. Several of these legends were collected by Abraham Moses Tendlau (Sagen und Legenden der Jüdischen Vorzeit).

In the late 19th century many folktales were gathered among Jews or published from Hebrew manuscripts by Israël Lévi in the Revue des Etudes Juives, in the Revue des Traditions Populaires, and in Melusine; by Moses Gaster in Folk-Lore and in the reports of Montefiore College; and by Max Grunwald in Mitteilungen der Gesellschaft für Jüdische Volkskunde; by L. Wiener in the same periodical; and by F. S. Krauss in Urquell, both series.

== Aggadah and folklore compilations ==
- The Legends of the Jews by Rabbi Louis Ginzberg, is an original synthesis of a vast amount of aggadah from the Mishnah, the two Talmuds and Midrash. Ginzberg had an encyclopedic knowledge of all rabbinic literature, and his masterwork included a massive array of aggadot. However he did not create an anthology which showed these aggadot distinctly. Rather, he paraphrased them and rewrote them into one continuous narrative that covered five volumes, followed by two volumes of footnotes that give specific sources.
- The Ein Yaakov is a compilation of the aggadic material in the Babylonian Talmud together with commentary.
- Sefer Ha-Aggadah, "The Book of Legends" is a classic compilation of aggadah from the Mishnah, the two Talmuds and the Midrash literature. It was edited by Hayim Nahman Bialik and Yehoshua Hana Rawnitzki. Bialik and Ravnitzky worked to compile a comprehensive and representative overview of aggadah; they spent three years compiling their work. When they found the same aggadah in multiple versions, from multiple sources, they usually selected the later form, the one found in the Babylonian Talmud. However they also presented a great some aggadot sequentially, giving the early form from the Jerusalem Talmud, and later versions from the Babylonian Talmud, and from a classic midrash compilation. In each case each every aggadah is given with its original source. In their original edition, they translated the Aramaic aggadot into modern Hebrew. Sefer Ha-Aggadah was first published in 1908–11 in Odessa, Russia, then reprinted numerous times in Israel. In 1992 it was translated into English as "The Book of Legends", by William G, Braude.
- Mimekor Yisrael, by Micha Josef (bin Gorion) Berdyczewski. Berdyczewski was interested in compiling the folklore and legends of the Jewish people, from the earliest times up until the dawn of the modern era. His collection included a large array of aggadot, although they were limited to those he considered within the domain of folklore.

== In art ==
Jewish folklore has been a theme of Jewish painting. Notable painters who used themes from Jewish folklore include Marc Chagall, Yitzhak Frenkel, Meer Akselrod and others. Themes painted by such artists include scenes from ordinary Jewish life, infused with folkloric elements and themes. Jewish folklore showcased itself through Hebrew micrography, papercutting, woodwork, artisanal works and more. In Eastern Europe, the shtetl was often a major theme in the work of Jewish artists, who infused fantasy with reality in their works.

== See also ==
- Jewish mythology
- Valley of the ants, a Jewish legend
- Johanan and the Scorpion
- The Fisherman's Daughter
- The Serpent Prince, or the Woman with Two Husbands
