= The Girl with Two Husbands =

Greek fairy tale about a serpent bridegroom

The Girl With Two Husbands is a Greek fairy tale translated and published by Richard MacGillivray Dawkins in Modern Greek Folktales. The tale is part of the more general cycle of the Animal as Bridegroom, and is classified in the Aarne–Thompson–Uther Index as tale type ATU 433B, "King Lindworm", a type that deals with maidens disenchanting serpentine husbands. In the Greek variants of the tale type, however, the story continues with the adventures of the banished heroine, who meets a man at a graveyard, rescues and marries him, and eventually is found by her first husband, the snake prince whom she disenchanted before.

== Sources ==
According to Dawkins, the tale originates from Thrace with the translated title The Girl thrice accursed.

== Summary ==
A king and queen have a daughter who is taught by a female teacher. The woman has wicked intentions and plans to marry the king by getting rid of the queen, and manipulates the princess to reach her goals: she treats the princess with kindness, gives her sweets and makes her bed with twelve pillows to sway her to her side. Now finally under her thrall, the female teacher asks the princess which she would rather see dead: the queen, her mother, or the teacher. The girl answers she would rather the teacher lives, thus the woman plots with the princess how to kill the queen: the princess is to ask for walnuts, which are in a lid, but only if the queen gives her some, then she is to close off the lid on the queen's head.

The princess does as the teacher instructed and closes the lid on the queen, killing her. After a period of mourning, the female teacher dotes on the girl even more and convinces her to ask the now widowed king to find a new wife, and mention her name. The king hears his daughter's suggestion, but denies her request and sets a test: he hangs a pair of iron shoes on an iron chain and declares he will only marry the teacher if the iron shoes fall from the chain. The female teacher advises the girl to speed up the process by dousing the chain with stinking water and rotten lemons. The chain rusts and releases the iron shoes, which the king perceives as a portent to marry the female teacher. The king relents and gives in to his daughter's suggestion, but warns the princess not to complain if his new stepmother mistreats her. After the marriage, the stepmother, who once treated her kindly, mistreats her. The princess locks herself in her room and cries.

Meanwhile, in another country, a queen goes for a walk in the mountains, sights a snake and sighs that she has no children, for even a snake has its young. Thus, she prays to God to give her a son, even in the shape of a snake. Thus, a snake son is born to her, but he cannot be born, since he bites any midwife that approaches him. Back to the princess's stepmother, she hears of this situation and decides to send her stepdaughter to help in the second queen's delivery. Fearing for her life, the princess goes to a priest to confess, and admits to her mother's murder. The priest chastises her and orders her to seek forgiveness and advice on her mother's tomb. The princess goes to her mother's grave and, in tears, asks for her forgiveness. Her mother's ghost's voice says she will help her, despite her death by her hands: the princess is to wear iron gloves and place a cauldron of boiling milk under the queen; the snake will sense the milk and exit his mother's body, then the princess is to take the snake with the iron gloves and tend to him.

The princess follows her mother's spirit's advice and delivers the snake prince. Next, the snake son's father bring wet nurses to suckle the prince, but he bites them all to death. The princess's stepmother sends the princess again to die, but she is advised on the queen's grave to use the iron gloves to suckle him. The third time, the snake son is ready to learn his letters, but he kills every tutor that his father has sent to teach him. The stepmother sends the princess to teach the snake son, since she was the one who helped in his delivery and in his feeding. The princess goes to her mother's grave in search of advice, and the queen's ghost tells her to use an iron rod to keep the snake at bay during her lessons.

Time passes, and the snake son keeps slithering and hissing about the palace, wanting to be married. His father the king arranges marriages for him with beautiful princesses, but each time he devours them during the night only their bones remain. In time, the king issues a proclamation to find one brave enough to marry the snake prince. The stepmother queen sends her stepdaughter, the princess, again, on the pretext that, since she helped in his delivery, suckled him and taught him letters, she shall be his bride. The princess goes to her mother's grave for advice, and her mother's ghost advises her to prepare a fire in his room, then order the prince to remove one of his shirts, which are each time to be tossed in the fire; if the prince orders the princess to undress, the girl is to reply he must do it first. The princess does as instructed and orders the snake prince to remove each of his shirts, while she removes her after his turn. When the snake takes off his seventh shirt, he becomes a handsome human prince and marries the girl in human form.

Later, the stepmother learns of her stepdaughter's successful marriage, then consults with wizards for a way to get rid of her. Finally she finds the right opportunity when the now human snake prince departs for war and leaves his wife under his mother's care, warning that, if anything happens to her, he will not return home. The stepmother writes a series of false letters with a command to expel the princess from the palace and cast her out into the world. The snake prince's mother receives the false letters and decides to hide them from the princess, whom they love. However, the princess suspects something is amiss and discovers heaps of letters supposedly sent by her husband. She confronts her parents-in-law and decides to leave the palace herself, since they would rather disobey her son's command.

The princess leaves on her own and finds work with some shepherds. One night, she stops to rest by a midden and watches as four fairies come and resurrect a dead prince from a midden, then bring him back to be buried in the midden. The princess meets the dead prince when he is revived and, nine months later, is heavy with his child. The dead prince, awake at this point, sends his wife to another land for protection and she must search for the palace of Riga, be welcomed in his name, and reveals how they can save their son: by banishing every black rooster from the city. The pregnant princess journeys on until she finds the palace of Riga and is welcomed by the prince's mother, and given lodge to have her baby. The princess gives birth to her baby and lulls her child with a song, saying in verse that, if the queen knew that baby was Riga's, she would place him in a silver cradle with swaddlings of gold. One night, the queen overhears the song and questions the girl how they can save prince Riga: the girl answers that no black rooster must crow in the kingdom and beyond. So the queen orders the roosters to be killed as they wait for the prince's liberation: the fairies revive prince Riga from the tomb and, when dawn comes, they cannot hear the crowing of any rooster. Defeated, the fairies fly away, and Riga is free to be with his lover and son.

Back to the now human snake prince, he return from war and learns of the false letters, then wanders off until he reaches the city of prince Riga, sighting his wife inside the palace with a child in her arms. He talks to her and tries to convince her to go back with him, but she tells she has a son now. Riga and the snake prince dispute over her, and the case is brought to a judge. The judge prepares a test: give the girl a sleeping drug so she sleeps for a while, and when she wakes up, the first one to offer her a glass of water shall have her as his wife. His orders are carried out, and the two princes lie in a long vigil. One night, the princess wakes up, laments her dilemma in some verses, and dies, torn for having to choose over two men she loved. The two princes awake and, on seeing the dead princess, also die by her side.

== Analysis ==
=== Tale type ===
The first part of the Greek tale type corresponds, in the international Aarne-Thompson-Uther Index, to tale type ATU 433B, "King Lindworm": a serpent (snake, or dragon) son is born to a king and queen (either from a birthing implement or due to a wish); years later, the serpent prince wishes to marry, but he kills every bride they bring him; a girl is brought to him as a prospective bride, and wears several layers of cloth to parallel the serpent's skins; she disenchants him. Tale type ATU 433B, "King Lindworm", is part of the cycle of the Animal as Bridegroom, stories that involve a human maiden marrying a prince in animal form and disenchanting him.

Richard MacGillivray Dawkins noted that the Greek tale formed a two-part narrative. In the first part, the heroine allows for a woman to become her stepmother, and she marries an enchanted prince in animal form; in a (rarer) second part, the heroine finds a second lover she rescues from the curse of the fairies and has to choose between them. Similarly, Anna Angelopoulou and Aigle Broskou, editors to the Greek Folktale Catalogue, and Michael Merakles noted that, in Greek variants, the heroine kills her mother on another woman's convincing and the woman becomes her stepmother; later, the woman sends the heroine to die at the hands of the snake prince (Ophis), but she survives with her mother's spirit's advice and disenchants the prince. In the second part of the tale, the heroine is either exiled due to falsified letters and revives a dead man who becomes her lover, or she rescues a man from the fairies, becomes pregnant and bears his son in his mother's castle (tale type AaTh 425E). At the end of both narrative sequences, she has to choose between both men.

Greek folklorist Georgios A. Megas considered that the Greek variants showed a contamination between tale type 433B, wherein the heroine disenchants the snake prince following her dead mother's advice, and subtype ATU 425E, "Enchanted Husband Sings Lullaby", wherein the pregnant heroine is sent by her lover, kidnapped by the fairies ("neraides", in the Greek tales), to his mother's castle, where she can give birth in safety.

=== Motifs ===
==== The snake prince ====
Scholar Jan-Öjvind Swahn, in his work about Cupid and Psyche and other Animal as Bridegroom tales, described that the King Lindworm tales are "usually characterized" by the motifs of "release by bathing" and "7 shifts and 7 skins". Similarly, according to Birgit Olsen, "in most versions" the heroine is advised by her mother's spirit to wear many shifts for her wedding night with the lindworm prince.

==== The heroine's dilemma ====
Greek folklorist Anna Angelopoulos noted that in "different versions", the heroine disenchants the serpent prince, but the story does not end at this point: the heroine is banished from the palace by her stepmother, but meets a "ghost" person that is prisoner of the fairies and whom she marries; she becomes pregnant by the second husband and is sent to the ghost husband's parents' house to give birth to their son; the first husband later appears to reclaim her. Swedish scholar Waldemar Liungman noted that the heroine, in the second part of the tale, is torn between a first and second husbands, and chooses the first - a dilemma that occurs "both in the Nordic as well as in variants from Eastern and Southeastern Europe". As for the nature of the second husband, he is a man cursed to be dead in the latter, while in the former region he is a prince in bird form or a man who has a contract with the Devil.

=== Origins ===
Richard McGillivray Dawkins, in his book Modern Greek Folktales, noted that in a Greek tale from Skyros the second husband's name, Τσίρογλéσ, corresponded to Turkish Köroglu, which may hint at an Eastern origin for the story. In the same vein, he mentioned that in a tale from Epeiros the second husband's name is Kirikos or Kirigli, another reference to the Turkish-Anatolian hero Koroglu. This, he believed, suggested a migration of the story from Asia Minor into Greek folklore.

== Variants ==
=== Distribution ===
Folklorist Stith Thompson noted that tale type 433B's continuation, with the heroine's adventures, occurs in the Near East. According to researcher Birgit Olsen and Greek scholars Anna Angelopoulou, Aigle Broskou and Michael Meraklis, the two-part narrative forms an East Mediterranean oikotype, popular in both Greece and Asia Minor.

=== Greece ===
The Greek Folktale Catalogue names tale type 433B as "Ο Όφις που έγινε βασιλόπουλο ή Η κόρη με τους δυο συζύγου" ("The Snake who Became a Prince, or The Girl with Two Husbands"), and registers 23 variants.

==== Tsyrógles ====
In a Greek tale titled Tsyrógles or Chyrogles, sourced from Skyros, a girl convinces her father to marry a woman with a daughter. Her new step-family is cruel to her and mistreat the girl. The step-mother sends her with basketfuls of clothes to wash in the river. She is approached by an old beggar who asks for food and water. She gives her crust of bread and shares a bit of her jug of water. She also delouses the beggar and is blessed with golden hair and the ability to turn her clothes into gold. The step-mother, jealous of the step-daughter's good fortune, sends her own daughter to the beggar. She insults the man and receives a blessing of horns and prickles. Meanwhile, the childless royal couple prays to God for a son, even if it is a snake - which is exactly what they are expecting. The snake son (called Ophis) needs to be suckled, so the step-mother sends her step-daughter to do it. The girl weeps on her mother's grave, and her spirit gives her advice on how to do it. Later, the snake son decides to marry, and the step-mother suggests that the girl who suckled the snake prince should marry it. The girl once again seeks counsel with her mother's spirit, who says she must prepare seven garments and seven ovens, and ask the snake husband to undress each layer of snakeskin first as she takes off each garment. The girl disenchants her husband by throwing his seven layers of snakeskin in the ovens. She gives birth to a son and Ophis, now human, goes to war. The girl's step-mother falsifies a letter with an order to expel the girl with her son from the palace. On her wanderings, she enters a church and meets a being named Tsyrógles. She later disenchants him into human form and marries him. Ophis returns from war and, seeing his wife is not there, discovers she is now married to Tsyrógles in another kingdom. Torn between her love for Ophis and her love for Tsyrógles, she dies of a broken heart.

==== Snake-Child ====
Austrian consul Johann Georg von Hahn collected a Greek tale from Wisiani, Epirus, with the title Schlangenkind ("Snake-Child"). In this tale, a woman wishes for a son, even if it is a snake, thus she gives birth to one. One day, the snake asks his mother to find him a wife. She goes to church and announces her request. The churchgoers laugh at her, but a stepmother promises to send her step-daughter to be the snake's wife. The step-daughter goes to her mother's grave to cry over her sad situation, but she has a dream about her mother telling her to burn her husband's snakeskin. The girl tells her mother-in-law to prepare an oven, then hang the snakeskin inside it after her son removes it. As the snakeskin burns, the snake son, in human form, smells the burning, but his wife dismisses it. The next day, the snake so cannot return to his snakeskin, and becomes human. In time, he and his wife have a son, but he is summoned to war, leaving his wife and son at home. The girl's stepmother, envious of her stepdaughter's good luck, whom the snake son married instead of her own daughter, creeps into her room at night and absconds her to the desert, then places her own daughter in her place. Back to the snake son's real wife, she realizes she is in a desert, and laments her fate. Her tears fall to the ground and water the earth, resurrecting a man named Kyrikos, who was buried underground. Kyrikos and the girl become lovers, and eventually she gives birth to his son. The pair return to his homeland and Kyrikos's mother celebrates her son's return after decades. Back to the human snake son, he returns home and notices his wife is not there, but his sister-in-law. Some time later, he travels to Kyrikos's land and reunites with his wife, but also learns she has a second husband. Thus, he takes the matter to court and the judge establishes a test for the girl to choose her husband: the girl is to stay on the ground, while both are to climb a mountain; whoever races down the mountain and reaches the girl first shall be declared her only husband. The now human snake son beats the challenge and stays with his wife, while Kyrikos says his goodbyes. The reunited couple returns home and he executes his sisters-in-law for her deceit.

Von Hahn collected another variant from Zagori: the first part is largely the same, but in the second part, after the snake son goes to war, his stepmother-in-law writes a letter with a false command to kill her and bottle her blood. The snake son's mother thinks it a strange command, but spares the girl and only cuts off her finger, banishing her to a desert. The girl eventually meets a man named Kirigli, stolen by the neraides. The girl becomes pregnant and goes to Kirigli's house to give birth, where his own wife welcomes the wandering girl. She gives birth to a boy and rocks her baby with a song, telling him he is Kirigli's child and, if his family knew it, they would cover him in silver gauze and put him in a silver cradle. Kirigli's wife take notice of the lullaby's verses and questions the stranger: she met Kirigli, stolen by the neraides, and he can be rescued if she brings cakes of honey bread to the neraidas, and demand him back. With the girl's advice, Kirigli's wife rescues him and brings him back to their house, and they let the girl live with them. Back to the human snake son, he returns from war and questions his mother about his wife's absence. He learns of the false letters and decides to search for her. He reaches Kirigli's house and finds his wife there playing with a child. Kirigli meets the snake son and both agree to let her have the last say in the matter: they give her three days to think over her decision, then if she shouts for "bread", it means she will choose her first husband; if she shouts "water", it means she will choose Kirigli. After three days, she shouts "bread, bread", marking her choice for her first husband.

==== The Teacher ====
Professor Michael Merakles published a Greek tale with the German title Die Lehrerin ("The Teacher"). In this tale, a shoemaker has a wife and a daughter. At school, the girl loves her female teacher so much she asks her to be her new mother. The female teacher then plot with the girl: she is to ask her mother for sugary treats from inside a chest and close off the lid on her head. It happens thus and the shoemaker's wife dies. The teacher becomes the girl's stepmother and begins to mistreat her, forcing her to do chores. Meanwhile, a local queen is having difficulties with giving birth to her snake son, for every midwife has died during the delivery. The stepmother sends her stepdaughter to be the prince's midwife, but she pays a visit to her mother's grave. Her mother's spirit advises her to bring a cauldron of milk and another of honey to draw the snake out of the queen's body. It happens thus. However, feeding the snake son still poses a problem, since he bites his wet nurses to death every time. Again, the girl is sent by her stepmother to die, and again she is advised by her mother's spirit: prepare a bag of milk and place it on her breast. The third time, the snake prince wishes to marry, but he bits his brides to death. The girl is sent to be the snake's bride, but, following her mother's advice, she takes the snakeskin and tosses it in a fireplace to burn it, which disenchants the prince. The shoemaker's daughter marries the prince. Later, war erupts, and the now human snake prince departs. The shoemaker's wife writes a series of false letters that cause her stepdaughter to be banished from the palace. She wanders off until she reaches another kingdom, whose prince has fallen into a long and deep sleep for twenty years, and can only be awakened after a maiden holds a vigil for forty days. The girl takes up the task, but on the fortieth day, an old woman appears and finishes the vigil, awakening the prince. The prince and the old woman marry, while his true saviour becomes a servant. The girl asks the prince for a butcher's knife, a hanged man's rope and the stone of patience. The prince brings the gifts without noticing their true meaning: a suicidal person's request. The prince stops the girl from killing herself, and executes the old woman. Later, the now human snake prince returns from war, discovers the false letters and goes in search for his wife. The human snake prince reaches the second prince's kingdom and recognizes his wife by her golden teeth. A judge is summoned to solve the dispute: they are to eat very salty food, and whomever she asks for water shall be considered her husband. However, the girl cannot choose between them, and dies of thirst.

==== Mother's Curse ====
In a tale published by Greek folklorist Georgios A. Megas with the title H κατάρα της μάνας ("Mother's Curse"), a king and a queen have a daughter named Maria, who goes to school. Maria likes her female school teacher so much she wants her to be her mother, and the teacher hatches a plan: Maria is to ask her mother to fetch some nuts from a marble box, and close the lid on her mother. Maria kills her mother, but the queen says her daughter will have to mourn on her grave for advice, and may God and the Virgin Mary forgive her. The queen is buried with pomp, and the girl convinces her father to marry her female teacher to give her a new mother. It happens thus, and the female teacher becomes Maria's stepmother. One day, after the king departs for war, a woman near the palace's verandah asks God to give her a snake for a child. When the woman is ready to be in labour, the new queen offers Maria to be her midwife, although the unborn snake's mother fears for her. Maria is forced to go, but goes to her mother's grave for advice; her mother's ghost admonishes her for the killing, but advises her to prepare a pot of honey and a bowl of milk, entice the snake with the food and toss him into a large box. It happens thus, and the snake child is born. Later, the snake son, called Όφις ("Ophis"), asks his human mother to be taught to read and write, suggesting Maria shall do it. Princess Maria goes to her mother's grave again and again receives advice: prepare iron rods to beat the snake son if he tries to bite her when learning the alphabet. The third time, Ophis asks his mother to find him a bride, and he suggests Maria. Maria goes to her mother's grave again and her mother's ghost simply tells her to be extremely careful. On the wedding night, Ophis asks Maria to close the door, then he removes his snakeskin to become a handsome prince, warning Maria not to tell anyone about his secret, lest she has to wear down three pairs of iron shoes in search for him. Maria and Ophis spend the night together, and he returns to his snakeskin in the morning. Eventually Maria betrays Ophis and reveals his secret, causing him to disappear. She dons the iron shoes and goes to her mother's grave, her spirit warning her her journey will be long, through mountains and valleys. Maria walks until she finds a grave; she enters the grave and further inside she finds a youth trapped to a chair. He explains he is prince Giorgios and the fairies ("neraides") kidnapped him from his father's palace and force him to dance every night. Giorgios turns Maria into an orange to protect her from the fairies, and eventually she becomes pregnant. Giorgios sends her to his mother's castle so she can give birth to their child. Maria is welcomed into Georgios's mother's castle and gives birth to a son. She rocks the baby with a song, saying that if they knew he is Giorgios's son, the baby would be dressed in gold and silver. The queen, Giorgios's mother, overhears the song and Maria explains everything, then a retinue go to the grave to rescue the prince: they light up incenses and toss them inside the grave to distract the fairies, then take Giorgios with them. Later, Ophis goes to Giorgios's castle, asks for some water and drops his ring in a jug. Maria learns her first husband Ophis is there, and both men begin to dispute whom she should be with. A priest suggests they place Maria atop a hill with each man on one side of her, Ophis with water and Giorgios holding nuts and her baby. Maria asks Ophis for water, but dies, fulfilling her mother's curse.

==== Yavrouda ====
In a tale collected by Jacob Zarrafits with the title Η Γɪ̯ΑΒΡΟΥΔΑ from Asphendiou in Kos, and published by Richard MacGillivray Dawkins with the title Yavrouda, better called The Wicked Stepmother and the Fairy Husband, a talented embroideress takes pupils. She is still single and sets her sights on a married man named Araklís. She tricks Araklís's young daughter, Yavrouda, who is her pupil, into asking her mother to fetch her some Ziya walnuts. Back home, Yavrouda asks her mother for some walnuts from their marble box, and closes the lid on her, breaking her neck and killing her. Yavrouda mourns for her mother and the embroideress convinces her her father, Araklís, can marry her so the girl can have another mother. It happens thus. As Yavrouda grows up and becomes beautiful, the embroideress begins to hate her stepdaughter. Yavrouda realizes the mistake she made in killing her mother, and begs for her mother's forgiveness. Meanwhile, the local queen is pregnant and ready to give birth, but any midwife who helps in the delivery end up with their hands bitten off. The king tries to find a new midwife, but no one wants to serve as one. The stepmother learns of this and convinces the king that Yavrouda can help in the queen's delivery. Yavrouda is brought to the palace, but flees to her mother's tomb to grieve and ask for help. Her mother's voice calls from inside the tomb and advises her how she can survive. Yavrouda returns to the palace and asks for two elbow-length iron gloves to be made, which she uses to help in the delivery of the prince, a snake with three heads. The king rewards Yavrouda with a tower and a village, to her stepmother's jealousy.

Next, the queen tries to nurse the snake prince, but he bites off the breasts of the nurses. Yavrouda's mother lies to the king the girl can help nurse the snake prince, so she is brought in. She goes to cry on her mother's tomb for help, and her mother advises her how she can survive: Yavrouda asks for a cauldron for milk, another of honey, and some sponges; she mixes the milk with honey, dips the sponge on it and suckles the prince. Lastly, the king arranges a wedding for the snake prince with the vizier's daughter, whom he devours in a gulp overnight. Many other brides fall to the snake prince's hunger, and Yavrouda's stepmother convinces the king to marry the prince to the one who helped in his delivery and nursing. Yavrouda learns of this and goes to cry on her mother's tomb. Yavrouda goes to the palace to marry the snake prince and is richly decked with a silver shift, a golden jacket, jewels and ornaments, and delivered to the prince. The snake demands that the girl undresses, but Yavrouda retorts that he should undress himself first. The snake prince removes his snake shifts and Yavrouda hers, until the prince removes all seven snakeskins to become a handsome youth. Yavrouda takes the seven snakeskins, tosses them in a brazier and spends the night with the now human prince. The following morning, the monarchs worry that Yavrouda has been killed, but find her safe and sound and a youth on her knee. Yavrouda and the prince explain she disenchanted him, and they are crowned prince and princess. The wicked stepmother learns of Yavrouda's lucky marriage and vows to destroy her.

Sometime later, the king's son has to depart for war and leaves Yavrouda under his parents' care, sending his wife letters from the battlefield. Yavrouda's stepmother intercepts the letters and falsified a message with an order to banish her to the mountains due to her unfaithfulness. The king reads the false letter and decides to banish his daughter-in-law. Yavrouda is banished to the wilderness and wanders off in a desert until she takes shelter in a cave. She laments again that she killed her mother unknowingly and suffers her curse, but her mother's spirit saved her before. Suddenly, the cave cleaves in the middle, and a light shines from within: a youth appears with a light in hand and meets Yavrouda. They share their woes, and the youth, prince Neros, explains that he is a king's mighty son who married and lost his wives on the wedding night; he wandered into a forest and met twelve dancing maidens, one of which he chose as his next one; the maidens advanced on him, kissed him all over, and captured him, taking him to the cave to be kept their captive, since the maidens kill him, place him in a tomb, then revive him to dance with them. Prince Neros advises her to go to his mother's palace and call on her son's name to be given shelter, since the is pregnant, and the queen will welcome her. Yavrouda follows Neros's advice and knocks on the doors to his mother's palace, who welcomes her. She is given lodging up a tower and gives birth to a son, whom she names Neros in his homage. At night, prince Neros himself appears to talk to Yavrouda, teaching her to sing a lullaby to the baby, mentioning the baby is his, despite not being his biological son. Yavrouda questions the purpose of it, but Neros assures it will help them both.

Yavrouda sings the lullaby, which the queen hears and questions Yavrouda about knowing Neros. Yavrouda denies it. This goes on for two more nights, until the queen places a maidservant near Yavrouda's door to spy on her: she listens to Neros and Yavrouda's conversation and reports to the queen Neros was there. The queen goes to see it for herself and discovers her son is alive, who vanished two years before. She goes to embrace him, but he vanishes. The following night, Neros passes to Yavrouda instructions to rescue him: sew a large linen cloth with one thread, wrap around the tower, close off any nook and crack, and place green crosses. It happens thus: Neros enters Yavrouda's room up the tower, and at midnight, the twelve flying maidens ("Anerádes") try to break into the tower. By dawn's early light and the rooster's crow, the maidens vanish and Neros is restored to the world of the living. The prince says he needs to still stay indoors for forty days, after which he marries Yavrouda. Back to the snake prince, he returns home from war and discovers his wife is missing, so the king shows him the falsified letters. The snake prince and the king deduce Yavrouda's stepmother did this, tie her up and throw her in a dark hole, then he goes in search of Yavrouda. He reaches Neros's kingdom and goes to drink from a fountain, when he notices Yavrouda up in the castle. He meets Neros and both discuss what to do, since Yavrouda has two husbands. They consult a judge, who advises them how to proceed: one should hold the baby and another a jug of water, and the three of them shall climb a mountain; who Yavrouda reaches for first shall be with her. It happens thus, and Yavrouda chooses the one holding the jug of water, the snake prince. Neros admits defeat and returns their son to them. Yavrouda returns home with the snake prince and their son. She forgives her stepmother and asks for her release, but the woman dies on the spot for her jealousy and envy.

== See also ==
- The Dragon-Prince and the Stepmother (Turkish tale)
- Dragon-Child and Sun-Child (Armenian tale)
- Mimikakliu (Albanian folktale)
- The Fisherman's Daughter
- The Serpent Prince, or the Woman with Two Husbands
- Champavati (Indian tale)
- The Enchanted Snake (Italian tale)
- The King of the Snakes
- The Story of the Hamadryad
- The Origin of the Sirenia
