= Dragon-Child and Sun-Child =

Armenian folktale

Dragon-Child and Sun-Child (Armenian: ՕՁԷՄԱՆՈՒԿ, ԱՐԵՒՄԱՆՈՒԿ, romanized: Ojmanuk, Arevmanuk) is an Armenian fairy tale. The tale is part of the more general cycle of the Animal as Bridegroom, and is classified in the Aarne–Thompson–Uther Index as tale type ATU 433B, "King Lindworm", a type that deals with maidens disenchanting serpentine husbands. In the Armenian variants of the tale type, however, the story continues with the adventures of the banished heroine, who meets a cursed man, rescues and marries him, and eventually is found by her first husband, the snake prince whom she disenchanted before.

== Sources ==
The tale was originally published by ethnologue and clergyman Karekin Servantsians in the compilation Hamov-Hotov, in 1884, with the title "ՕՁԷՄԱՆՈՒԿ, ԱՐԵՒՄԱՆՈՒԿ" (Armenian: "Ojmanuk, Arevmanuk"). Author Frédéric Macler later translated it to French as Enfant-Serpent, Enfant-Soleil. The tale was also translated to English as Dragon-Child and Sun-Child by A. G. Seklemian and as Snake Child Otsamanuk and Arevamanuk, who Angered the Sun.

== Summary ==
A king has no children, and even the doctors cannot help him. One day, while on a hunt, he sees a snake with its young and sighs that even a serpent has its young. God answers his prayers and the queen gives birth to a monster, half-human, half-snake. The monarch places his son in a well and feeds him with goat's milk. In time, he grows larger, and begins to demand meat for his nourishment. Thus, the king begins to send humans to be devoured every week, first girls, then maidens. It happens to every family in town, until the lot falls on a family consisting of a widower, his daughter, his second wife, and his stepdaughter.

Both spouses argue about whom to send, and his wife insists his own daughter girl should be given as the sacrifice this time to the snake monster, called Dragon-child, instead of her own daughter. The girl cries to God for an answer. In her dreams, a voice talks to her to give her advice: her father should prepare three pots of milk, she should wear a mule (or bull's) skin and be suspended over a well; the snake will ask her to take off her garments, and she should thrice answer the snake prince must first take off his garments first; she should then cut the rope that ties her, jump into the well and wash the prince with the milk.

When she wakes up, she relays the instructions to her father, and is given the provisions. She is lowered down the well and faces the Dragon-child, insisting he removes his snakeskin first. The creature does and becomes a handsome youth. Realizing the dream was right, the girl quickly cuts up the bull's skin to continue the process, but in a hurry she accidentally tumbles down and breaks part of her front teeth. Stopping at nothing, the girl douses the prince in the milk, and releases him from his serpentine curse. The girl's father, overlooking the events from the rim of the well, rushes to tell the monarchs the good news. The king and queen hurry to the well and rope their son and the girl out of the pit, the prince now a human youth. Rejoicing in this fact, the monarchs marry the prince to the girl.

One day, the now human Dragon-child goes to war, but before he departs he leaves his wife under his mother's care, warning her to not let her out of their sight. While he is away, the girl's stepmother devises a wicked plan to destroy her, for her fortunate marriage: she tries to talk to the queen about letting the girl visit their family at least for a day, which the queen denies. The stepmother then sends her husband, the girl's father, on her behalf, and the queen attends his request. The Dragon-Child's wife is sent to her family house and the stepmother invites her for a bath in the sea. The woman then shoves the princess into the open sea, and dresses her own daughter as the princess to trick the snake prince.

As for the girl, she holds on to some flotsam and is washed away by the waves. She washes ashore on a beach, naked and tired, and weaves some clothes out of moss. In her long wanderings, she finds a cottage with a man asleep inside. The man awakens from his sleep and sights the maiden. She tells him her story, and he explains his own situation: he lived a very dissipate and arrogante life with no care in the world. one day, on a hunt, he was desperate to find some game, and decided to shoot the Sun itself, who became enraged for this affront and cursed the man, called Sun-Child, never to see sunlight again. Thus, Sun-Child can only leave the cottage at night to forage and hunt for food, lest he leaves it in the daylight and promptly dies.

The girl and Sun-Child fall into a routine, she becomes his companion, and eventually becomes pregnant. Sun-Child decides to send the girl to his parents' castle for her to give birth in safety, with a letter urging his parents not to look for him, for he is cursed. Sun-Child accompanies the girl to his parents' castle, avoiding the light of the Sun, then returns to the cottage. His parents welcome her as their son's wife and she gives birth to his son. Sun-Child's parents wish to rescue him, but the girl dissuades them. On some nights, while the girl is rocking the child with a lullaby, she hears a voice in the distance, singing to his son, despite the danger of his curse. Sun-Child 's parents also listen to the song, which the girl explains it is Sun-Child's voice, but they do not believe her at first, so they decide to catch the stranger. On another night, they discover it is indeed their son, Sun-Child, but he begs to be released, due to his curse.

The next morning, the sun's rays touch Sun-Child, and he falls dead, and still lies in that state after sunset, to everyone's horror. His parents mourn for the son they lost again, until his mother has a dream about having to travel on iron shoes and with an iron cane towards the West, and walk until the iron apparel is worn out. The woman wakes up, commissions the iron garments and begins her journey towards the West, passing by the lands of white men, black men, red men, and all sorts of animals and magical creatures, like fairies and djinns. She finally arrives at a palace made of blue marble. She enters the palace and finds a Queen dressed in shining garments.

The Queen says no mortal soul is allowed in Heaven, but senses her visitor is a person with a dire reason for her journey. The woman explains the reason for her journey, and the Queen says Sun-Child is an evil man, for he tried to kill the life-giving Sun, who is her son. Still, for her plight, the Queen advises the grieving human mother to take some of the water of the pond where he Sun bathes after his return, for it will revive Sun-Child. After the Sun returns, Sun-Child's mother hides behind a counter, then fetches some of his bathwater, and returns to revive Sun-Child.

Reports of her story reach far and wide. Back to Dragon-child, he returns from the wars and notices his wife is missing, with someone else in her place, for his wife has a golden tooth to cover her missing teeth, while the impostor does not. For this, Dragon-child journeys to Sun-Child and his mother's lands in hopes of getting his help. Dragon-child and Sun-Child break bread and become friends, and he recognizes his wife at the dinner table for her golden tooth. Dragon-child and Sun-Child decide to prepare a test for the person the girl will choose as her husband: they feed her very salty meat, and the person she asks for water shall be her husband. It happens thus, and the trio ride a bit in the fields. Suddenly, the girl shouts for "Sun-Child", but Dragon-child attends to her first, quenching her thirst. The girl tells Sun-Child to keep their son, while she leaves with Dragon-child back to their kingdom.

== Analysis ==
=== Tale type ===
The first part of the Armenian tale type corresponds, in the international Aarne-Thompson-Uther Index, to tale type ATU 433B, "King Lindworm": a serpent (snake, or dragon) son is born to a king and queen (either from a birthing implement or due to a wish); years later, the serpent prince wishes to marry, but he kills every bride they bring him; a girl is brought to him as a prospective bride, and wears several layers of cloth to parallel the serpent's skins; she disenchants him. Tale type ATU 433B, "King Lindworm", is part of the cycle of the Animal as Bridegroom, stories that involve a human maiden marrying a prince in animal form and disenchanting him.

In a 1991 article, researcher Suzanna A. Gullakian noted a combination between tale type 433, "The Prince as Serpent" (called Odzmanuk in Armenian variants), and an independent type indexed as type 446, "Муж, умирающий на день" (English: "Husband that dies during the day"). In the latter type, a youth named Arevmanuk ("Sun Youth") tries to shoot at the Sun, who, annoyed at this provocation, curses him to sleep during the day and never see the sun again; Arevmanuk's mother, then, travels to the Sun in order to reverse the curse. Gullakian stated that, when this type combines with type 433, it retains the youth cursed to die during the day, but removes the Sun's curse and the youth's mother's journey. (Note: Georgian scholarship registers its own tale type for the second part of the story (exiled heroine finds a dead man). In this Georgian type, numbered -446*, "Husband Seemingly Dying at the Daytime", the heroine finds a man at a church, who dies during the day and revives at night. They marry, she bears him a son and he is captured and dies for good. The heroine goes to the Mother of the Sun for a cure. Georgian scholarship noted that this narrative sequence was "contaminated" with type 433B, "The Prince as Serpent".) When both types are combined, in the second part, the wife of the serpent prince meets another man, whose name may be Arevmanuk, Arin-Armanelin, or Aliksannos.

The storyline that appears in the Armenian tales is as follows: a king or poor couple suffer for not having children, when they pray to God for a son, even if he is a serpent. Thus, the queen or woman gives birth to a snake or vishap, who begins to devour the local girls or demands a bride that he devours. Eventually, there are no available brides/victims for him, save for a pair of stepsisters in a poor household. The male half of the couple is hesitant to send anyone, when his wife convinces him to send his own daughter to the snake prince (called Odz-Manuk, or "Snake-Child"). The girl goes to her mother's grave and receives advice from her spirit on how to break the prince's curse by removing the snakeskins. The girl's stepmother learns of her stepdaughter's fortunate marriage and plans to destroy her: she takes the now princess to a river and shoves her in, then places her daughter to trick the snake prince. The heroine survives and washes ashore in another land, where she enters a temple or a cave and discovers a handsome youth lying on a bed. The youth, Arev-Manuk or Sun-Child, wakes up at night and dies or falls asleep during the day due to shooting arrows at the Sun during a hunt, and was cursed for this affront. The heroine and Sun-Child fall in love and she becomes pregnant, then he sends her to his mother's castle where she can give birth to their child in safety. Sun-Child's mother refuses to shelter the pregnant heroine at first, until the latter evokes the name of Sun-Child. The heroine gives birth in a humble room and is visited by Sun-Child in the shape of a bird, who comes to ask about his wife and son. The queen, Sun-Child's mother, overhears the conversation and discovers her son, then is told how to break the Sun's curse. They join forces to restore Sun-Child and he lives with the heroine and their son. Back to Snake-Child, he goes on a quest for his missing wife and reaches Sun-Child's lands, where he finds the heroine, his wife, with a second family. The heroine leaves her son with Sun-Child with his father and goes back with Snake-Child.

=== Motifs ===
==== The snake prince ====
Scholar Jan-Öjvind Swahn, in his work about Cupid and Psyche and other Animal as Bridegroom tales, described that the King Lindworm tales are "usually characterized" by the motifs of "release by bathing" and "7 shifts and 7 skins". Similarly, according to Birgit Olsen, "in most versions" the heroine is advised by her mother's spirit to wear many shifts for her wedding night with the lindworm prince. In a 1979 article, researcher Suzanna A. Gullakian noted that the serpent youth was a popular form of the supernatural husband in Armenian tales, with 12 texts related to two tale types: AT 425 and AT 433. In Armenian variants, the name of the serpent prince is Odzmanuk.

==== The heroine's dilemma ====
Swedish scholar Waldemar Liungman noted that the heroine, in the second part of the tale, is torn between a first and second husbands, and chooses the first - a dilemma that occurs "both in the Nordic as well as in variants from Eastern and Southeastern Europe". As for the nature of the second husband, he is a man cursed to be dead in the latter, while in the former region he is a prince in bird form or a man who has a contract with the Devil.

== Variants ==
According to Armenian scholarship, seven Armenian variants are listed in the international index as type ATU 433 (although the Armenian Folktale Catalogue groups them under its own type, ATU 446).

=== Enchanted Snake and Arin-Armanelin ===
In an Armenian tale titled "Змѣй оборотень и Ари Арманели" or "Օձ-մանուկ եւ Արին-Արմանելին" ("Enchanted Snake and Arin-Armanelin"), sourced from Jafarapat, in Ejmiadzin, a king and queen have a son that is a snake. Years later, the snake prince wishes to get married, but his mother questions the idea, since no woman would want to marry a snake. News spreads to the every house in the city, and reaches the ears of a local stepmother, who tells her husband to send her stepdaughter as the prince's bride. The queen pays a thousand pieces as her dowry, and the soldiers escort the girl to the palace. The girl goes to her mother's grave and cries her to sleep. Her mother's spirit advises her to be wrapped in ox's skin and take a stick to beat the snake three times; he will ask her to remove her dresses, but she is to command him to remove his shirts first. The girl wakes up from the dream and goes to the palace, then is sent to the snake prince's chambers. She does as her mother instructed her to do, and disenchants the prince into human form. They celebrate a new wedding. Some time later, the snake prince's wife is forced out of home by another woman, who removes her clothes and abandons her by the sea. The naked girl wanders off until she reaches a house where a dead man lies inside, although there is food nearby. When the sun sets, the man wakes up and finds the girl, introducing himself as Arin-Armanelin. Arin-Armenelin and the girl live together for three years, him dying during the day and reviving at night, and she becomes pregnant. The man sends the girl to his father's palace to give birth in safety, and she is to ask shelter upon the head of Arin-Armanelin. The girl does that and is let in, but placed in the stables. For three nights, Arin-Armanelin comes into the stables on a horse to ask his wife about their lodgings, and she answers she is sleeping on a dry mat and the baby is eating only dry bread. Arin-Armanelin's parents learn of their son's visits and move the girl to better accommodations. Later, Arin-Armanelin takes the girl for a ride on the limits of his kingdom, and meets the now human snake prince. The snake prince tells Arin-Armanelin the girl riding with him is his wife, and Arin-Armanelin answers that she is also his wife. The tale was translated to German as Odsmanuk, der Schlangenjüngling, und Arin-Armanelin ("Odsmanuk, the Snake-Youth, and Arin-Armanelin").

=== The Wicked Stepmother ===
In an unpublished Armenian variant collected by Susan Hoogasian-Villa from informant Mrs. Katoon Mouradian, The Wicked Stepmother, a dervish gives an almond to the king to cure the queen's barrenness. The queen bears a snake for a son, and the story attributes this to the almond peel. The snake is to be given a girl to devour every day. A poor man's daughter is selected as the new sacrifice, and she has a dream that she must take a pail of milk and wash the snake being with it. She disenchants him to a normal human being. The now human prince explains that the other girls are actually alive and married to personifications of the elements. The girl and the prince marry, until he has a dream and must go to war. Some incidents occur during the tale, but the girl's step-mother throws her down the river, and she washes ashore in a "dark world". In this strange new realm, she meets a man that is blind during the day and can see at night, a curse placed on him for he has shot two fawns of a mother deer. The girl marries the blind man, and is sent to his parents. Her mother-in-law has a dream her son's sight can be restored if one fetches the water in which the Sun bathes. The girl and her son journey to the Sun, and the Sun's mother forgives the blind man, with the caveat to not shoot any more deer. At the end of the tale, the girl must choose between the snake husband and her new paramour, to whom she has begotten a son: the girl decides to return to her first husband, the snake man, and leaves her son with his father. Both Susan Hoogasian-Villa and D. L. Ashliman grouped this tale with others of type 433B.

=== The Tale of Arev-Manuke ===
In a tale collected from a Don Armenian source with the title "Сказка об Арев-Мануке" ("Tale of Arev-Manuke"), a childless queen and king pray to God for a son, make pilgrimages and donate to the poor, and still nothing. One day, however, the queen senses she is heavy with child, and later gives birth to her son. Just as soon as he is born, he devours an entire plate of food, and his parents suspect he is a vishap. His appetite is so voracious that the cook is tired of preparing him food. The monarchs want to take care of the situation, and decide to drop him inside a well and feed him a girl every day. In time every virgin maiden in the city is devoured, save for two step-sisters. The girls' parents discuss who they should send first, and the stepmother wins: the man decides to send his own biological daughter. The girl, named Dunya-Guzeli Mayram, resigns to her fate, and goes to cry on her mother's grave. She rests by the grave, and her mother, in a dream, advises to take a stick near the grave, return home and make her father prepare 40 pieces of flatbread and to dress her in a buffalo's hide; when the king lowers her to vishap, she is to throw him one of pieces of flatbread and beat him with the stick; she is to continue doing this for 40 days, and her destiny will reveal itself. Mayram wakes up and finds the stick which she pockets and goes home to follow her mother's instructions. Thus, she is lowered into the well to be given to the vishap, named Otse-Manuk ("Little Snake"). The vishap asks the girl to remove the buffalo's hide, but the girl retorts that the prince should remove his skin first. The girl then throws the flatbread to him, then beats him: this releases many snakes from inside the boy, which are responsible for his voracious appetite. After 40 days, Mayram disenchants the prince into a handsome youth with a resplendent countenance. Mayram's face also becomes involved in a resplandent shine, the horses dare not approach the well. The monarchs approach the well and find his son in human form, and marry him to Mayram. Mayram's stepmother learns of her step-daughter's fortunate marriage, and laments she did not send her own daughter, blaming her husband for this. Thus, she takes her daughter with him for a visit to Mayram. The stepfamily walk with Mayram in the garden, until they reach the outskirts of a forest. Mayram falls asleep; the stepfamily removes her clothes and puts them on the girl's step-sister, then returns to the palace. Otse-Manuk returns and asks where is his wife. Mayram's stepsister pretends to be his wife, but Otse-Manuk says his wife is beautiful, instead he finds an ugly person in her place, then decides to look for her in iron shoes.

Back to Mayram, she wakes up and notices she is naked. She wanders off until she finds shelter inside a black-stoned church, where the body of a man is lying inside, his body surrounded by candles and some sherbet jars. Mayram repositions the candles and sherbet jars (the ones at his feet for the ones near his head and vice-versa), causing the man to awaken. Mayram introduces herself to him and asks for his help. The man decides to send her to his mother's palace, where she is to take shelter by asking in the name of Arev-Manuk. The story then explains Arev-Manuk used to hunt and shoot birds, which angered God, Who decided to punish him by cursing him into a death-like state. Mayram reaches Arev-Manuk's mother's palace, and she, a queen, still mourning for her lost son, denies her request. Mayram returns to Arev-Manuk three times to talk to him about it, and it is only on the third time his mother lets her in, but places her in the barn. Mayram gives birth to Arev-Manuk's son, a golden-haired boy with a moon face and pearly teeth. Some servants prepare them some food. Arev-Manuk turns into a bird and flies to the barn to ask Mayram about her and the baby, and she tells them they are sleeping in the barn. Arev-Manuk then laments that, if his mother knew the baby was Arev-Manuk's child, Mayram would be lying in silk and their son in a golden cradle. On the second night, the maidservants report the incident to the queen, and the queen herself goes to meet her son in bird form on the third night. Arev-Manuk begs his mother to release him, for the time of his curse (seven years) is almost at an end, but he can be saved if some drops from the water with which God washes His hands is given to him. Arev-Manuk's mother takes her as his son's wife, and asks her to find the cure for her son. Mayram walks until she reaches God and begs Him for the water, but He denies her. The girl then has a dream about the Mother of God, who gives her a golden jar with the water. Mayram returns with the jar and revives Arev-Manuk, breaking his curse. For this, the queen orders a marble fountain to be built near a seven-path crossroads, where a golden basin is to be placed for people to wash their faces and with a portrait of Dunya-Guzel Mayram; whoever makes use of the fountain is to be taken to the palace at once. Some time later, a man in shabby clothes, Otse-Manuk, comes to have a drink at the fountain, and is taken to the queen's palace. Otse-Manuk tells his tale and how he is looking for his wife. Arev-Manuk answers that he has taken Mayram as his own wife, but, since both of her husbands are there, they should let her decide with whom she wants to stay: they give her a golden sherbet jar, which she gives to Otse-Manuk, marking her decision. Arev-Manuk accepts this outcome, and Otse-Manuk returns to his palace with his wife. He then punishes Mayram's stepfamily by tying them to forty horses. Otse-Manuk and Mayram celebrate a new wedding. The tale was originally collected in 1875, from a Crimean woman named Gayan, by poet R. Patkanyan.

=== Arevhat and Ojmanuk ===
In an Armenian tale titled Արևհատ և Օձմանուկ ("Arevhat and Ojmanuk"), translated as Slice-of-Sunshine and the Snake-Child, Sun-Maid and Dragon-Prince and The Fair Maiden Sunbeam and the Serpent Prince, a childless king notices a mother snake with its young on the ground, and laments to God his lack of an heir. God hears his prayers and gives him a son: the queen bears a little snake. After a week, the snake becomes a dragon ('vishap'), and demands food. One day, the chamberlain's daughters spies on the prince and is devoured. This gives the king an idea: he sends his soldiers to brings maidens to be devoured every day. At one time, the soldiers find a beautiful maiden named Arevhat under a tree, and bring her in to be sacrificed to the dragon. Arevhat is lowered to the dragon's chambers, and simply greets him just as she lands. With this, the prince dragon form changes to that of a human prince. The prince, named Odz-Manouk, falls in love with Arevhat. The king asks his soldiers to check if the girl has been devoured, and the soldiers find him in human form and the girl still alive, then report to the king. The monarch goes to meet his son, now in proper human shape, and embraces him as his son. The prince tells the king he wishes to marry Arevhat. After a grand wedding of seven days and seven nights, the king asks his daughter-in-law, Arevhat, about her origins. Arevhat then explains she is an orphan and lived with a mean stepmother who forced her to do chores at home. At one opportunity, the woman ordered the girl to take the cattle to graze and to spin a bushel of wool. Arevhat recalls how she accidentally dropped the bushel into a well that led to a cave where an old woman lived, who beckoned her in. Arevhat swept the old lady's cave and deloused her hair, and she dipped the girl's head in a yellow water, gilding her hair. Arevhat had to hide her now golden hair with a sheep's rumen, but her stepmother discovered it and ordered Arevhat to lead her stepsister to retrace her steps to the same cave. However, Arevhat's stepsister, just as mean as her stepmother, disobeyed the old lady, and for this she was dipped under black water, the liquid dyeing her hair and skin black as night. Arevhat's stepmother banished the girl from their house, and she spent some time weeping under the tree, when the king's soldiers found her and brought her to the dragon prince. Charles Downing sourced this version to an informant in the village of Ashtarak, in Ayrarat, collected in 1912.

== See also ==
- The Dragon-Prince and the Stepmother
- The Girl with Two Husbands
- Mimikakliu (Albanian folktale)
- The Fisherman's Daughter
- The Serpent Prince, or the Woman with Two Husbands
- The Padlock (Italian fairy tale)
- Habrmani
