= The Origin of the Sirenia =

Die Entstehung der Sirenen (Khmer: រឿងដើមកំណើតសត្វផ្សោត; English: "The Origin of the Sirenia") is a Cambodian folktale published by Rüdiger Gaudes, wherein a girl lives with a tree god in python form that provides her and her family with treasures, while another family tries to have the same fortune by finding another python and accidentally let their daughter be devoured.

The tale is related to the international cycle of the Animal as Bridegroom, wherein a heroine marries a husband in animal form who reveals he is a man underneath. In this case, the heroine marries a husband in animal shape that becomes human, while another girl marries a real animal and dies. Variants of the narrative are located in India and Southeast Asia.

== Source ==
The tale was provided by a source named Koung Chandana, from Chrey Vien, in Prey Chhor district, Kompong Cham.

== Translations ==
French researcher Solange Thierry translated the tale, originally titled Rÿoeṇ ṭoen kaṁnoet satv phsot, to French with the title Histoire de la naissance de l'animal phsot ("The Tale of the Origin of the Phsot Animal"), which she sourced from a Khmer person named Kong Chandan from Prey Vien. The tale was also translated into German by author Ruth Sacher as Die Geburt des Delphins ("The Birth of the Dolphin"), also sourced from the Khmer. Russian scholar Nikolay D. Foshko translated the tale to Russian as "Откуда пошли дельфины" ("How the delfins originated").

== Summary ==
People in a village revere and worship a large fig tree (toem jrai, in Thierry's text), where they build an altar with a male and female figures (called "Neak-ta" in Gaudes's) to which they make offerings for fortune and prosperity. The tale also mentions that a "king of the tree" (a "Waldgott", 'forest deity', in Sacher's translation) has lived many years in the fig tree. In the village, a woman gives birth to a girl. When she grows old, she goes to make an offering to the altar, when the devatā (the spirit that lives in the tree) falls in love with her, as if he knows her from another time. He ponders on the meaning of this feeling and consults with god Indra (Preah En, in Gaudes's text). The deity explains that, in a previous life, both the devatā and the girl were husband and wife, and wished to reincarnate as husband and wife again. The tree god lived as a hermit, separated from his wife, and they drifted apart in this life.

In light of this revelation, the devatā thinks about begging Indra to die and be reborn as human, so he can be with his wife, but discards this course of action, since human lives are fleeting. Thus, he decides to manifest himself to the girl, but as a snake (a python), so he can explain to her he is her Ku-Preng, reborn as a tree spirit, and they can be together again. He turns into a python and slithers to the girl's room at night, where he reveals their past incarnations' lives. The girl questions the devata's claims, so, as proof of his powers, he changes back into a human shape, becoming a handsome youth and spending the night with her. The devata says she must not tell her parents about his secret, only that he is a python, saying he will come at night to be with her.

However, the girl's parents hear some voices in their daughter's room and go to investigate, finding the large python coiled around their daughter. The python leaves, and the girl tells them everything, including the promise to keep his secret identity. The next night, the tree god comes back to be with his wife in human form again, and her parents spy on their rendezvous. They also worry the tree god will return to his python shape. The next morning, the tree god tells the girl her parents should dig at a certain location which is filled with treasures: gold and silver, jewels, and tableware. The girl's family does as instructed and becomes rich.

In another village, another family learns of the tree god's girl's good fortune and envy them, since the tree god has given them the means to buy cattle and servants. The wife tells her husband the tree god in python form was the one to provide them with riches, and asks her husband to find their daughter a serpent spouse, since she knows that in the forest the python is guarding a treasure. The man goes to the forest the next day and finds a coiled serpent on a small hill, which the story says coiled around itself to rest. The man brings the serpent home and treats it as a son-in-law, marrying the animal to his daughter in a grand feast. The man's neighbours notice the folly of his deed, but he goes on with it at any rate.

On the wedding night, the serpent, which is a real animal, wakes up and coils around the girl. It begins to devour her piece by piece: first, by the knees, then the waist, up to her neck and lastly the head. The girl tries to warn her mother about it, but the woman dismisses her daughter's pleas, until her daughter's voice is heard no more and she goes to investigate: the girl has been swallowed whole and the woman screams in horror. Her husband is alerted by the screams and discovers that his daughter has been swallowed whole. With the help of other villagers, he captures the savage python and releases her from the serpent's belly. The girl is indeed rescued from a cruel fate, but her body is covered in slime and malodours. Her family and her village try to wash the mucus away, but it has remained glued to her body. Humiliated by the whole ordeal, she takes a kettle with her and decides to jump into the sea. The girl then becomes a phsot, in Thierry's translation (irawaddy dolphin), or a Sirenia in Gaudes's.

== Analysis ==
=== Tale type ===
The tale is classified in the international Aarne-Thompson-Uther Index as AaTh 433C, "The Serpent Husband and The Jealous Girl", a subtype of type AaTh 433, "The Prince as Serpent". In this tale type, a girl marries a snake who gives her jewels and ornaments and becomes human after the burning of his snakeskin; another girl tries to imitate with a real snake, with disastrous and fatal results.

However, in his own revision of the folk type index, published in 2004, German folklorist Hans-Jörg Uther subsumed types AaTh 433 ("The Prince as Serpent"), AaTh 433A ("A Serpent Carries a Princess to Its Castle") and AaTh 433C under a new type: ATU 433B, "King Lindworm".

=== Motifs ===
==== The snake's tree ====
Professor Stuart Blackburn stated that some Southeast Asian variants contain the motif of the fruit tree owned by the snake, whose fruits either the sisters or their mother want. More specifically, it is found in central Arunachal Pradesh, and among the Kucong and Nusu people of Yunnan. According to Gaudes, the sacred fig tree from the tale is the Ficus religiosa species.

==== The sea mammal ====
Gaudes translated the serpentine animal as "python", not "boa", which appears in Sacher's translation, for, according to him, the python is native to Southeast Asia. As for the sea mammal, although Sacher's text gives its name as "dolphin", he decided to translate it as "Sirene" (manatee). Thierry states, in her notes to the story, the Dictionnaire Guesdon defines phsot as a type of cetacean that lives in Cambodia, although she supposed that the species described in the tale was a dugong.

==== Other motifs ====
Type 433C also contains the motif J2415.7, "A snake for the real daughter. Stepdaughter, married to a snake, appears decorated with jewels. Stepmother desires a snake be procured for her daughter. She is swallowed instead".

=== Interpretations ===
Ruth Sacher argued that the tale merged Buddhist teachings with animistic and shamanistic ideas in order to present a lesson against material greed.

== Variants ==
In his 1961 revision of the tale type index, American folklorist Stith Thompson indicated 5 variants of the type, found only in India. Hence, Thompson and Warren Roberts's work Types of Indic Oral Tales links this tale type "exclusively" to South Asia. In addition, according to professor Stuart Blackburn, this is the "Asian" version of the snake-husband story, and variants of the narrative (girl marries snake and is fortunate; jealous girl marries another snake and dies) are reported in India (in Nagaland and Assam), Southeast Asia, China, and among Tibeto-Burman speakers in central Arunachal Pradesh and the extended eastern Himalayas (e.g., the Apatani, Nyishi people, Tagin people, Garo people and Lisu people). Taiwanese scholarship also locates variants of subtype 433C in Cambodia and Indonesia.

=== The origin of the Dugong ===
French ethnologist Eveline Porée-Maspero collected another version of the tale from an informant named Khim, from the village of Pišei. In this tale, titled L'origine du dugong ("The Origin of the Dugong"), a girl marries a nak, gaining a rich and handsome husband, and another girl is forced by her mother to marry a python. At night, the python devours the second girl, but she is rescued from its belly. However, the girl is covered with a mucus, jumps in a river and becomes a dugong.

== See also ==
- Champavati
- The Story of the Hamadryad
- God of Waters (Sre folktale)
