= List of municipalities in Sivas Province =

This is the List of municipalities in Sivas Province, Turkey as of March 2023.

District	Municipality
Akıncılar	Akıncılar
Altınyayla	Altınyayla
Altınyayla	Deliilyas
Divriği	Divriği
Doğanşar	Doğanşar
Gemerek	Çepni
Gemerek	Gemerek
Gemerek	Sızır
Gölova	Gölova
Gürün	Gürün
Hafik	Hafik
İmranlı	İmranlı
Kangal	Kangal
Koyulhisar	Koyulhisar
Şarkışla	Cemel
Şarkışla	Gürçayır
Şarkışla	Şarkışla
Sivas	Sivas
Sivas	Yıldız
Suşehri	Suşehri
Ulaş	Ulaş
Yıldızeli	Güneykaya
Yıldızeli	Yıldızeli
Zara	Zara
