= Deliktaş =

Deliktaş may refer to:

== People ==
- Nuray Deliktaş (born 1971), Turkish female taekwondo coach and former practitioner
- Serdar Deliktaş (born 1986), Turkish football player

== Places ==
- Deliktaş, Baskil
- Deliktaş, Bitlis, a village
- Deliktaş, Dikili, a village in Izmir Province, Turkey
- Deliktaş, İnebolu, a village
- Deliktaş, Kangal, a village in Sivas Province, Turkey
- Deliktaş, Şenkaya

== Other uses ==
- Deliktaş Tunnel, a railway tunnel near Deliktaş, Kangal in Sivas Province, Turkey
