= Altınyayla =

Altınyayla is a Turkish place name meaning "golden plateau" and may refer to:

- Altınyayla, Burdur, a town of Burdur Province, Turkey
- Altınyayla District, Burdur, a district of Burdur Province, Turkey
- Altınyayla, Sivas, a town of Sivas Province, Turkey
- Altınyayla District, Sivas, a district of Sivas Province, Turkey
