= The Dragon-Prince and the Stepmother =

Turkish fairy tale about a serpent bridegroom

Folk tale
- Name: The Dragon-Prince and the Stepmother
- Aarne–Thompson grouping: ATU 433B, "King Lindworm"
- Region: Turkey
- Related: The Stepdaughter and the Black Serpent; The Girl with Two Husbands; Dragon-Child and Sun-Child; The Fisherman's Daughter; The Serpent Prince, or the Woman with Two Husbands

The Dragon-Prince and the Stepmother is a Turkish fairy tale collected by Turkologist Ignác Kúnos. The tale is part of the more general cycle of the Animal as Bridegroom, and is classified in the Aarne–Thompson–Uther Index as tale type ATU 433B, "King Lindworm", a type that deals with maidens disenchanting serpentine husbands. In the Turkish variants, however, the story continues with the adventures of the banished heroine, who meets a man at a graveyard, rescues and marries him, and eventually is found by her first husband, the snake prince whom she disenchanted before.

== Sources ==
The tale was published by Kúnos with the Hungarian title A sárkány-királyfi ("The Dragon-Prince"), and translated to German as Der Drachenprinz und die Stiefmutter.

== Summary ==
A padishah has no children. One day, he is riding along with his lala, when he sees a dragon stroll along with its young. Longing to have a son, he prays to Allah for a son. His wife falls ill with a mysterious disease, and every nurse that enters her room dies of shock. With no other resources, a female subject has a stepdaughter whom she hates and intends to get rid of, and goes to talk to the monarch about the girl's supposed skills that could help the queen. The girl fears for her life, and confides in her father about what to do. The man says that perhaps visiting her mother's grave can bring some comfort.

Before the girl goes to the palace, she cries on her mother's grave. Her spirit counsels the daughter: take a kettle of milk to the queen's room. The girl arrives at the palace, asks for a kettle of milk as her mother instructed, and helps the queen in her mysterious disease. After a while, the girl goes to tell the padishah he has a son: a dragon.

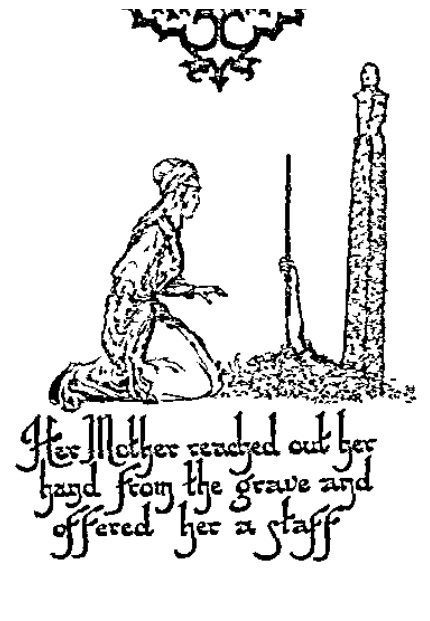
From her grave, the girl's mother gives her a staff to use on the Dragon-Prince. Illustration by Will Pogany for a 1913 book.

Later, the dragon wants to be educated. Hodjas are brought from everywhere, but the dragon-prince kills them all before they have a chance of teaching him. This second time, the stepmother tries the same trick, and tells the padishah her stepdaughter can teach the dragon-prince. The girl goes to her mother's grave for comfort, and her mother's arm springs from the grave with a staff. The girl's mother's spirit advises to take the staff and use it on the prince in case he attacks her during lessons. The girl goes to teach the prince, and he tries to attack her, but she scolds him with the staff.

Finally, the dragon-prince wants to be married, but every maiden they bring him is devoured every night, a fate the stepmother wishes on her stepdaughter. The maiden is once again helped by her mother's spirit and is instructed to wear a mask made of hedgehog skin, which will prickle him if he tries to attack her. Next, he will ask her to take off the mask, but she has to reply he must take off his clothes first, take the dragonskin and toss it in the fire. On the wedding night, the girl is brought as the dragon-prince's bride, and goes in for the kill, but the girl rebuffs him and tells him to take off the clothes. The dragon-prince obeys and removes the dragonskin, which the girl tosses in the fire. A handsome youth appears in the place of the dragon, and both spend the night together. The girl is celebrated as the prince's releaser.

Time passes. War erupts against a neighbouring padishah. The now human dragon-prince offers to go in his father's place, and leaves his wife unguarded at home. While he is away, the girl's stepmother writes a false letter on the prince's name sends to the prince's father, with orders to banish his wife. The padishah reads the letter, which his daughter-in-law overhears him doing so, and decides to exile herself, following the letter's false orders. She wanders about until she reaches a fountain, a coffin nearby, holding a youth. When night comes, forty pigeons alight in the fountain, become women, run to the coffin and wake the youth up with a magical stick. The resurrected youth talks with the women until dawn, when the maidens touch him with the stick again and he falls into a death-like state. The Dragon-Prince's wife repeats the magical action and wakes the youth, who tells her he was stolen as a boy by the peris. They fall in love and she becomes heavy with his child.

One day, the youth warns her the forty dove-peris may learn of their union and their unborn child, so he sends her to his mother's house so she can give birth there, away from the peris that come at night. The girl goes to her house and begs for shelter. She is let in out of pity, and gives birth to a son that same night. Some time later, a dove perches on the window and asks about the boy. The girl answers mother and son are fine, and the dove departs. The old woman, who is the youth's mother and the baby's grandmother, overhears their conversation and is happy to find her son again. She then asks the girl to lie to the dove the next time he appears, saying the boy is angry at his father.

The next time the bird appears, the dove is told the lie and flies in, then takes off the birdskin to become human. The old woman enters the room and asks her son how she can save him from the peris. He explains they must take off the birdskin and toss it in a burning oven, so the peris will shout that their king is burning and will try to retrieve the birdskin; after the peris enter the oven, they are to be locked in to be burnt to death. The youth's instructions are followed to the letter: the peris are destroyed and the youth is back to his family.

Back to the dragon-prince, he returns from war and learns of the falsified letters and his wife's departure. The dragon-prince searches for her until he reaches a land where a great conflagration occurred, and goes to a coffeehouse. The prince tells the coffeehouse keeper he is looking for his wife, and the keeper says a man has been saved from the peris by a beautiful girl, which the prince suspects her to be his wife. As soon as says it, the youth rescued from the peris enters the coffeehouse. The dragon-prince goes to talk to him, learning they have a commonality: their wife. The prince asks the man to inform the wife the Black-eyed Snake is looking for her, and expects her to make a choice.

The girl is told that the dragon-prince is looking for her, and chooses to be with her former husband, despite having "two roses" with her current one. The dragon-prince and his wife return home and he confronts her stepmother, asking the latter which she prefers: forty sticks or forty mules. She replies "forty mules" since the sticks are for her enemies. With this, she is punished by being tied to forty mules, while the couple celebrate their happiness.

== Analysis ==
=== Tale type ===
In the Typen türkischer Volksmärchen ("Turkish Folktale Catalogue"), by Wolfram Eberhard and Pertev Naili Boratav, both scholars classified the Turkish tales as Turkish type TTV 106, "Die schwarze Schlange" ("The Black Snake"), which corresponds in the international classification to tale type AaTh 433. They also commented that the stories followed a two-part narrative: a first part, with the disenchantment of the snake prince, and a second one, wherein the expelled heroine meets a man in the graveyard and marries him.

The first part of the Turkish tale type corresponds, in the international Aarne-Thompson-Uther Index, to tale type ATU 433B, "King Lindworm": a serpent (snake, or dragon) son is born to a king and queen (either from a birthing implement or due to a wish); years later, the serpent prince wishes to marry, but he kills every bride they bring him; a girl is brought to him as a prospective bride, and wears several layers of cloth to parallel the serpent's skins; she disenchants him. Tale type ATU 433B, "King Lindworm", is part of the cycle of the Animal as Bridegroom, stories that involve a human maiden marrying a prince in animal form and disenchanting him. In addition, the second part of the Turkish tales follows what Georges Dumézil termed "The woman who married a Snake and a Dead Man".

Greek folklorist Georgios A. Megas considered that Greek variants showed a contamination between tale type 433B and subtype ATU 425E, "Enchanted Husband Sings Lullaby", where the pregnant heroine is sent by her lover, kidnapped by the fairies, to his mother's castle, where she can give birth in safety. He also noted that the combined narrative corresponded to Turkish type (TTV) 106, "Die schwarze Schlange" ("The Black Snake").

=== Motifs ===
Comparative mythologist Emmanuel Cosquin noticed that the motifs of the Turkish tale collected by Kúnos (the dragon-prince's ferocity, the heroine being sent by her stepmother to die by helping the prince's delivery, teaching him and marrying him, and the heroine getting help from her dead mother) appear, sometimes isolated, in European tales found in Italy.

==== The dragon-prince ====
Scholar Jan-Öjvind Swahn, in his work about Cupid and Psyche and other Animal as Bridegroom tales, described that the King Lindworm tales are "usually characterized" by the motifs of "release by bathing" and "7 shifts and 7 skins". Similarly, according to Birgit Olsen, "in most versions" the heroine is advised by her mother's spirit to wear many shifts for her wedding night with the lindworm prince.

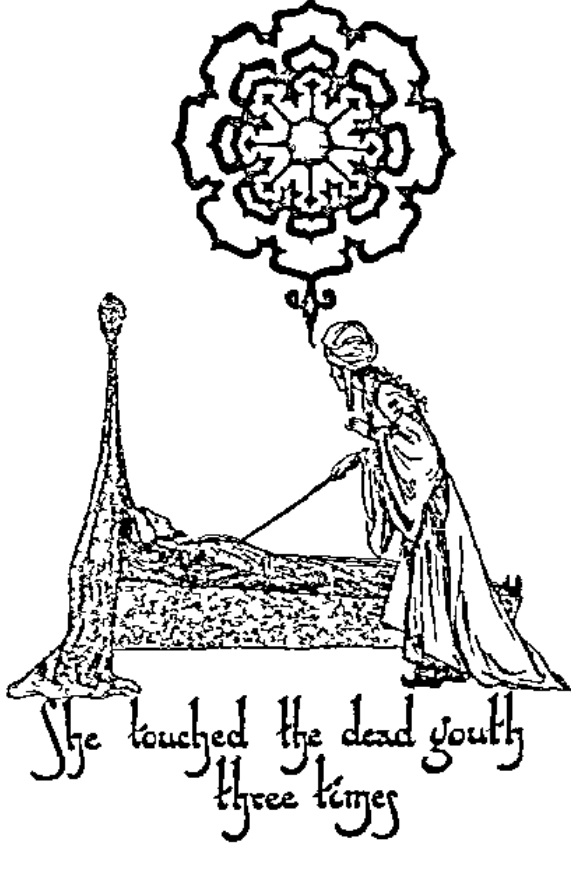
The stepdaughter finds the dead youth. Illustration by William Pogany for a 1913 book.

==== The heroine's dilemma ====
Swedish scholar Waldemar Liungman noted that the heroine, in the second part of the tale, is torn between a first and second husbands, and chooses the first - a dilemma that occurs "both in the Nordic as well as in variants from Eastern and Southeastern Europe". As for the nature of the second husband, he is a man cursed to be dead in the latter, while in the former region he is a prince in bird form or a man who has a contract with the Devil. Similarly, Samia Al Azharia John noted that in "all Turkish variants", the heroine is expelled from home due to a false letter and meets a man at the graveyard. The man is victim to a spell by wicked peris in the shape of doves, and is eventually released by the heroine's interference. She eventually marries the dead man, but the snake prince, restored to human form, finds her and disputes her over the second husband.

== Variants ==
=== Distribution ===
Folklorist Stith Thompson noted that tale type 433B's continuation, with the heroine's adventures, occurs in the Near East. According to researchers Birgit Olsen and Warren S. Walker, and Greek scholars Anna Angelopoulou, Aigle Broskou and Michael Meraklis, the two-part narrative forms an East Mediterranean oikotype, popular in both Greece and Asia Minor. According to Gyula Németh, the first part of the tale is "very widespread" in Anatolia ("dieses in Anatolien stark verbreiteten Märchens", in the original).

=== Turkey ===
==== Tales about snakes ====
===== The Black Snake =====
Turkologist Ignác Kúnos published a tale titled Кара јылан (Turkish: Kara yılan; English: "Black Snake"), in the 8th volume of Vasily Radlov's Proben der volkslitteratur der türkischen stämme. In this tale, a padishah suffers for not having any children, and journeys with his vizier to find a solution for his problem. On the road, a dervish suddenly appears and announces he has an apple to be eaten by the padishah himself and his wife, so she can bear a child. After nine months and ten days, the queen is ready to give birth to a black snake, but the child kills every midwife that dares to approach him, until there is no midwife left in the kingdom. An old woman, who wants to get rid of her stepdaughter, orders the girl to go to the padishah's palace and act as midwife to the prince. The girl goes to her mother's grave and her mother's voice, from the grave, advises her: she is to take a box with milk and approach the queen; when the snake exits the queen's body, lock him up in the box. The girl does as instructed and delivers the box with the snake prince to the padishah, and is rewarded. After four of five years, the snake prince tells his father he wants to be schooled, but he bites every teacher to death, eventually killing all teaches in the kingdom. The old woman sends her stepdaughter again to the padishah's palace, this time to teach the prince. The girl's mother's voice advises her to gather forty-one rose stems and use them to beat the prince before he attacks her. Again, the girl succeeds and teaches the prince. The third time, the snake prince wishes to marry, but every bride they bring him is bitten to death. The old woman tells the padishah her stepdaughter, who delivered the prince and taught him, should be his bride. The girl goes to her mother's grave for advice and is instructed to wear forty-one hedgehog skins on her wedding night, so that, when the prince poises to attack her, the hedgehog skins will prickle him; she is then to order him to shed layers of his snakeskin, just as she is to remove the skins she is wearing, to disenchant the prince into a youth handsome as a full moon. With her mother's advice, the girl dons the skins and goes to the bridal bed, and disenchants the prince into human form. After two months, the now human snake prince says he will go on a two-month journey, and leaves her with his parents. He then sends a letter, which some girls living in the palace intercept and falsify to tell the prince's parents to break his wife's hands and legs and banish her. The girl reads the false letter and decides to leave the palace on her own. She goes to the mountains and finds a coffin with a dead man inside. The dead man comes to life and tells the girl to hide with him in the coffin, for a pigeon appears to bring him food and may kill her. After nine months, the girl becomes pregnant with the dead man's child, and he sends her to his mother's castle to bear their child in safety; she has to beg on Bakhtiyar's name to be let in. The girl does as Bakhtiyar instructed her and is welcomed by his mother; a son is born to her, and the Bakhtiyar comes in the night to name his child: Huptiyar. The following nights, Bakhtiyar comes to rock his child, and, soon after, the castle's servants prepare a heavy dark curtain decorated with stars to fool Bakhtiyar that it still night, to let him tarry until dawn. Bakhtiyar comes to rock his child and his mother embraces him, tricking him into thinking it still night. The pigeon appears and tries to call for Bakhtiyar's attention, but it is dismissed, then perches on the windowsill, a branch on a tree, then disappears. Bakhtiyar is saved and spends time with his family for forty days and nights. Back to the now human snake prince, he returns home and learns of the false letters, and goes to look for his wife. He reaches Bakhtiyar's lands and meets the man in a coffee house. Both share their stories, and Bakhtiyar brings the prince home, where the spouses reunite. Bakhtiyar lets the girl choose whom she wants to be with by sitting next to them, but tells her their son stays with him. The girl chooses to be with her former husband.

===== The Story of the Black Snake =====
Turkologist Theodor Menzel translated a tale from the Billur Köşk, a compilation of Turkish Anatolian stories. In this tale, titled Die Geschichte von der Schwarzen Schlange ("The Story of the Black Snake"), a padishah has no son and is convinced by the vizier to go on a pilgrimage. The duo meet a dervish who gives him an apple, half to be given to his wife and the other to be eaten by him. He follows his instructions, and his wife becomes pregnant with a black snake, but the baby won't exit her womb, for it bites any midwife. The servants search for a midwife in a hurry and a woman suggests her stepdaughter can help deliver the prince. The girl goes to her mother's grave and her spirit advises her: take a box with milk inside it and, if the snake prince wants to hurt her, lock the box when he exits the womb. It happens thus, and the black snake prince is given birth. Next, he wishes to be schooled, but he bits to death any teacher, and the stepmother sends her stepdaughter again. On the second attempt, the girl is advised to take with her forty-one rose stems to use on the prince. Finally, the black snake wants to marry, but every bride is killed by him. The same woman is advised by her mother's spirit to wear 41 hedgehog skins on the nuptial night, and take off one by one, as she tells the prince to take off one of his clothes. She disenchants him into a human prince. They live together for a time. After two months, while her husband, now human, goes to war, an envious slave exchanges letters and delivers an order to break the princess's arm and to throw her out. The girl decides to leave home before any harm befalls her, and exiles herself. During her wanderings, she goes to the mountains and finds a place filled with graves. Suddenly, a youth comes out of a coffin and warns her that a dove will come and may kill her, so she should hide with him in the coffin. The girl does as instructed, and lies with him in the coffin. In time, she becomes pregnant, and the youth, named Bakhtiyar, sends her to his mother's castle, where she is to beg for shelter in his name and give birth there to their son. The girl goes to Bakhtiyar's parents' castle and asks a slave to be let in on her lover's name. The girl is taken in and gives birth to a boy. That same night, the youth appears to her and names his son Havbetjar. The prince appears in the following two nights, and the queen makes him stay with them, but he warns them that the dove may harm them if it appears. By the morning following the third night, the dove perches on the window and tries to call for Bakhtiyar, but he pays it no mind. The bird begins to fall from the windowsill and tries to call for help, then explodes. Back to the snake prince, he returns from war and learns of the false letters, then goes to look for his wife. He reaches a coffeehouse in Bakhtiyar's land, where he meets the youth. After listening to the stranger's tale of woe, Bakhtiyar takes the snake prince to meet the girl, and sets a test: the girl can choose her husband by entering the room where they are. The girl chooses the now human snake prince and leaves with him, while Bakhtiyar keeps their son Havbetjar with him. Orientalist Friedrich Giese retranslated Billur Koshk's version to German with the title Die Geschichte von der schwarzen Schlange ("The Tale of the Black Snake").

===== Yilan Bey and Peltan Bey =====
Turkish author Ziya Gökalp published a tale titled Yılan Bey'le Peltan Bey ("Lord Snake and Lord Peltan"). In this tale, a sultan has no children, so he wishes for a snake as a son. Thus, one is ready to be born by his wife, but it does not exit the womb and kills every midwife that attempts to help. This information reaches the imam, whose wife suggests her stepdaughter can help in the delivery. The imam's daughter goes to cry on her mother's grave, and her spirit advises her to take with her a pot of milk, for the snake to drink from. It happens thus, and the snake prince is born. Years later, he tries to be taught, but kills every teacher. The imam's wife sends her stepdaughter again, who cries on her mother's grave, but her mother's spirit assures no harm shall befall her. She teaches the prince with no problems. The third time, the prince wants a wife, but he kills every prospective bride. The imam's daughter is given to him as a bride, and she is advised to wear forty layers of garments on her. On the wedding night, she takes off her layers of dress just as the snake prince takes off his forty layers of snakeskin, and becomes a human prince. After a while, war breaks out, and the now human snake prince joins in the fray. Meanwhile, the imam's wife takes her stepdaughter to a wedding in the countryside on false pretenses, removes her dress and jewelry and shoves her naked into a river. Ayşe, the girl, survives and is washed ashore. Trying to hide her nakedness, she hides behind a grave, which opens up and a youth named Peltan Bey appears. The youth takes her inside the grave and lives with her, explaining he is a prisoner of the fairy king and has to tutor a group of children. In time, she becomes pregnant after four months - which Peltan Bey explains Allah united them in marriage and declares her husband, Yilan Bey, is probably not looking for her. Peltan Bey sends her to his father's castle, where she can give birth to their son, and tells her how he can break the spell: throw her grandchild's shirt in an oven and pretend the baby is burning; two peris will come to rescue the baby and will burn to death. Ayse goes to Peltan Bey's palace and gives birth to her son. A blue bird comes at night and rocks the baby with a song - an event that is witnessed and informed by a black nanny to the king. The king follows the instructions Peltan Bey left with Ayse, and two peris fall into an oven and burn to death, breaking his enchantment. Ayse eventually bears two daughters by him. Back to the snake prince, he learns his wife was exiled from the palace and goes after her in iron shoes and with an iron cane. After seven years, the snake prince reaches Peltan Bey's lands and meets him. Peltan Bey shows the guest his wife, who is the snake prince's spouse. Ayşe decides to stay with Peltan Bey for their children; the snake prince turns back into a snake and slithers away.

===== Yılan Bey (Erzurum) =====
In a Turkish tale collected by Bilge Seyidoğlu from Erzurum with the title Yılan Bey ("Serpent Lord"), a padishah is childless. One day, on a journey, he walks near the beach and listens to the frogs' croaking. He sighs for not having a son, and says a prayer to Allah to give him one, be it a snake. The padishah's prayers are answered and his wife is pregnant with a snake. However, the animal does not leave his mother's womb, and no midwife is capable of helping, since they are all bitten to death. News reach the ears of a local woman who hates her stepdaughter, and says the girl can help in the delivery. Being but a fifteen-year-old, she fears for her life and asks to have some private time to say her prayers. She says her prayers and cry for her fate, then falls asleep. In her dream, a dervish appears and gives her advice: take two sticks from under a stone, one red and one green, get a straw sieve and bring the queen to the inner gardens; if the snake tries to attack her, she is to beat him with the sticks. The girl goes to the palace and, following the dervish's instructions, manages to deliver the prince, who exits the queen's womb. The girl is handsomely rewarded and goes home. Later, when the snake son is fifteen years old, his father wishes to see him married, but he kills every bride. Finally, the stepmother sends her stepdaughter as the snake's bride. The girl spares some moments for herself to pray and cry for her fate, and the same dervish appears in her dreams to guide her: put on layers of clothes and socks and enter the chambers, then ask the prince to remove a skin just as she removes a piece of clothing. The dervish then explains the snake prince is the son of the king of peris, given to the padishah as answer to his prayers. Now with the right instructions, the girl goes to the prince's chambers and does as the dervish instructed, transforming the snake into a human prince, whom she marries. Three years later, the now human snake prince goes to war, while wife's stepmother spreads rumours about her around the palace and sends them a letter with a false order to banish her. The girl takes shelter near a grave in a graveyard, and overhears three birds talking about a youth named Ahmet, son of the village chief, lying in a grave, but he is actually alive and the birds' feathers can dig him up. After the birds leave, the girl plucks the feathers and digs up Ahmet's grave, rescuing him. Ahmet takes the girl to his parents' house, marries her, and they have two children. Back to the now human snake prince, he returns from war and learns his wife has been banished from the palace, then goes in search for her from village to village, until he eventually reaches Ahmet Bey's village and discovers his wife is there with a second family. The snake prince tells Ahmet's family their daughter-in-law is actually his wife, and they decide to bring the question to the mufti. The mufti advises to let the girl eat salty food and drink no water. During the test, the girl asks Yilan Bey to give her water, which seals the mufti's decision. The girl returns to the snake prince, while Ahmet Bey stays with their children.

===== Yilan Bey (Çorum) =====
In a Turkish tale collected by professor Necati Demir from a source in Çorum with the title Yılan Bey ("Serpent Lord"), a couple has no child. Scholars and doctors come to assess the situation, but provide no answer. After nine months, the woman is pregnant, but every midwife that tries to help in the baby's delivery is killed, for their son is a snake. In the same village, an orphan girl lives with her stepmother, who pushes her to be the boy's midwife, in hopes of killing her. The girl cries for her situation, but, one night, an old man appears in her dreams and advises her: request for a bowl of milk, some cotton, and a stick, which will help in the snake's delivery. The girl wakes up and goes to the couple's house, requests the materials and safely helps in the snake's delivery. Some twenty years later, the snake son is all grown up and wishes to marry. His father, who is rich, searches for potential brides for his son, but he bites them all to death. The stepmother decides to send her stepdaughter again to be the snake's bride, in hopes she dies this time. Once again, the old man appears in her dreams and advises her to wear forty layers of skin, to parallel the forty layers of snakeskin the snake son has, and she is to take off one layer and ask the snake son to shed one skin. It happens thus and the snake son turns into a human youth. Some time later, the snake son, now human, joins the army, and the stepmother lies that his wife, her stepdaughter, is not a good person, which causes her to be banished from home. The girl takes shelter with a mother and son, whose name is Ilhan Bey, and is set to marry him. The snake son returns, discovers the truth and goes to look for his wife, finding her with the second paramour. Both men argue about who the girl should be with and take the discussion to court. The judge makes a way to settle the dispute: prepare a salty bread and give her a bit, she will ask for water and whoever gives her water to drink shall be her husband. The judge's orders are followed through, and the snake son gives her water. The girl then remains with her first husband.

===== Yilanbey and Gelenbey =====
In another tale from Çorum with the title Yılanbey ile Gelenbey ("Snakebey and Gelenbey"), husband and wife, Idi and Bidi have no children, so they pray to Allah for a child to be born to them. Their prayers are answered and a girl is born to them, whom they name Aykiz. Meanwhile, a padishah's wife gives birth to a boy that is cursed by a witch to become a snake. In this state, he kills every approaching person with hsi bite. Back to Aykiz, her mother Bidi dies and her father remarries, but her stepmother dislikes Aykiz's beauty. The padishah issues a proclamation that whoever disenchants the prince will be rewarded. The stepmother tells the padishah Aykiz can do it. The girl is brought to the palace in tears, but an old man appears and gives her two sticks, a green and a red one, for her beat the red one on the green twig. Aykiz enters the palace and does as the old man instructed, restoring the prince to human form. As a reward, she marries the prince. Aykiz's family is brought to live with her. Still hating her stepdaughter, she lies to the girl that she can find a place beyond the mountains where she can dance with her husband. Aykiz falls for her trick, dons iron shoes and walks with an iron cane there. She reaches a place where there are petrified people, and goes down a valley, where she finds the same old man again. The old man gives her a bottle with water to use on the petrified people to restore them. She does and among them is a youth named Gelenbey, whom she falls for. Aykiz and Gelenbey make their way to Yilanbey's palace. Yilanbey asks his wife why he left, and she explains about her stepmother's story. Yilanbey also asks her whom she prefers to be with, and she chooses Yilanbey.

===== The Girl who Married Two Snakes =====
In a Turkish tale collected in Çukurova with the title Iki Yılanla Evlenen Kız, a man becomes a widower. One day, he sends his daughter to a female teacher, who goads the girl into setting her up with her father. The man and the teacher marry. Some time later, the man is summoned to another town and leaves his daughter under his new wife's care. However, as soon as he leaves, the woman steals his riches and locks her in the basement. In the same city, a local padishah's wife is pregnant, but cannot give birth to a son. The woman, who knows the queen is pregnant with a snake that will kill anyone it sees, convinces the padishah to hire her stepdaughter as the prince's midwife. The girl goes to her mother's grave to cry, and her mother's spirit tells her to have some boiled milk in a pot for the baby prince. The girl does as instructed, and out comes the snake prince, a creature with human upper torso and serpentine lower half. The girl tells the padishah she wants nothing more to do with the prince, but the padishah thanks her, since his wife always gave birth to snakes that bit everyone, and rewards the girl with ornaments. The stepmother steals the girl's gifts and mistreats her again. The second time, the snake prince wants to be schooled, and the stepmother sends the girl again. The girl cries over her mother's grave, and her spirit tells her to fetch a sturdy stick, beat him on the head while saying "Sübhaneke" and "Allahümme". The girl teaches the prince like this. Later, the snake prince joins the military, then returns home and asks for a bride. The stepmother sends her stepdaughter to marry the snake, hoping she dies. The girl goes to her mother's grave for counsel, and her mother's spirit advises her to don seven layers of clothes and heat up an oven, ask the prince to remove his skins and remove one of her own layer; after all seven skins are shed, she is to toss them in the oven to burn them. It happens thus, and the snake prince is disenchanted into a normal human youth. The now human prince tells his parents he will leave for two months, dons iron sandals and departs, leaving his wife unprotected. The stepmother sends a false message to abandon the girl someplace else. The girl is banished in a desert and takes shelter in a cave. A snake approaches her and asks her to marry him. The girl says that her destiny lies in marrying another snake, and is taken to the snake's mother's house, who is another human. The second snake's mother questions the girl about her prospective marriage, since even she fears her snake son, and the girl assures her future mother-in-law. The snake prepares a golden crib for their children. The girl gives birth to a boy and a daughter. Some years later, when the children are six or seven, the girl asks her second snake husband if she can join with other women of the village for conversation. The snake husband agrees. Suddenly, the now snake prince meets with his wife, but she says that, although she loves her first husband, the prince, she is now mother to two children and cannot abandon them. However, the girl admits to her second snake husband that she fears her first husband will bite her, and dies of a broken heart. The second snake prince finds his wife dead, raises the children and, when they are old enough, decides to take his own life by throwing himself into a pyre. The first snake husband also dies by throwing himself in the fire.

===== Yilan Bey and Şeker Hanım =====
In a Turkish tale collected from a source in Yozgat with the title Yılan Bey ıle Şeker Hanım, a padishah has no children. One day, his wife sees a snake under a tree and prays to Allah to be given a son, like a snake. Thus, one is born to them. In time, the snake prince asks his female tutor, Şeker Hanım, that he wants to marry, and chooses the daughter of the sultan of India. The princess is given to the snake, who demands she takes off her clothes and join him in bed, but the girl is too afraid to move. For this, the snake bites the princess and she dies. Next, the snake princess asks to be married to the daughter of the Chinese sultan. The second princess is given to the snake, but she also dies. Şeker Hanım, who knows the truth about the prince's enchantment, asks the king to commission a dress of forty layers, for she will marry the snake prince. Despite some reservation, the king does as asked and Şeker Hanım enters the prince's chambers. The snake prince asks her to take off her clothes and join him in their bed, but Şeker Hanım asks him to take off a layer first, for she will remove one of hers next. As they remove their own garments, Şeker Hanım disenchants the snake prince into a handsome youth. Some time later, while the now human snake prince goes on a hunt, Şeker Hanım's sisters learn of her fortune and conspire to ruin her: they falsify a letter telling her to leave before he returns. Şeker Hanım tells her father-in-law she will leave, and wanders off to another land, where she finds work as a goose-herder. The snake prince returns home, learns his wife left home, and goes to find her. He crosses the mountains and finds his wife at the house where she found work as a goose-herder and takes her home to the palace. The snake prince asks his sisters-in-law which they prefer: forty knives or forty mules? The sisters-in-law agree to forty mules, and they are tied to forty mules to be drawn and quartered.

===== Human Snake (Afyon) =====
In a Turkish tale collected from informant Makbule Özcelik, in Afyon, with the title Yılan Adam ("Human Snake"), a widowed poor man lives with his daughter. The girl convinces his father to remarry, and a neighbour women marries him. The women soon begins to despise her stepdaughter when the man is not at home. Meanwhile, the local sultan suffers for not having children, and one day finds snakelings under a stone and utters a wish to Allah to be granted one, even if he is a snake. Thus, in time, his prayers are answered and the sultana becomes pregnant, but cannot give birth to her son. Midwives are sent to help in the delivery, but they die one by one. This frightens the local midwives away. The soldiers knock on every door for one, and reach the poor man's house. The poor man's wife says her stepdaughter can serve as replacement midwife, and the soldiers take the girl with them. The girl asks to visit her mother's grave first, and cries at her mother's grave in the cemetery. Her mother's spirit answers her from the grave and reveals the prince is a snake, which she must draw out from the queen's womb with a cauldron of milk. The girl is introduced to the sultan and asks for a cauldron of milk, then helps in the delivery: a snake is born to the sultan and his queen. The sultan raises the snake prince and, one day, he says he wants to study. The sultan sends for the best teachers, but the snake bites them all to death. Desperate at the situation, the sultan consults with the viziers how to fulfill the snake prince's request while keeping the teachers alive. The viziers mention the girl who helped in the delivery, and send for her. The girl goes to the mother's grave for comfort and counsel, goes to the palace and pets and caresses the snake prince, which allows her to teach him. Later, the snake son wishes to marry, and the monarch sends for brides from far and wide. The brides enter the wedding chambers in a wedding dress and come out with torn clothes, since the snake strangles and kills them. The viziers mention the girl who helped in his delivery and in his education shall be his bride. The sultan sends for the girl at her stepmother's house, and the girl goes to her mother's grave again. This time, the mother's spirit advises her to don a thorny dress to wear on the wedding night, and ask the prince to remove a layer of skin. The girl dons the thorny wedding dress and asks the prince to remove his snakeskin, who retorts she should remove hers first. The girl insists on the prince removing his snakeskin first, and becomes a handsome man like the full moon. The girl soon throws the snakeskin in the fire, and they spend the night together. The next morning, the sultan finds his son in human form, and celebrates with a forty-day and forty-night event. After the now human snake prince settles into his royal life, he warns his wife to not let anyone into their quarters, save for him and the servants. After he leaves, the stepmother learns the girl had a fortunate marriage with the prince and vows to kill her, then goes to the girl's room in the palace. She convinces the girl to show a finger so the woman could place her husband's ring on the finger, sticks a poisoned ring and leaves. The prince returns and finds his wife in a death-like state. The following morning, he goes for a walk in the gardens and overhears the conversation between three pigeons by the pool, saying the prince has to take out the ring and it will revive the girl. The prince does as the pigeons instructed and revives his wife. The girl reveals it was her stepmother's doing, and the sultan sends his soldiers to capture her. The woman is asked if she wants forty mules of forty knives, and chooses forty mules, so she is tied to forty mules and let loose in the mountains.

===== Snake Groom (Balikesir) =====
In a Turkish tale collected from informant Muzeyyen Karakoç, in Balıkesir, with the title Yılan Damat ("Snake Groom"), a sultan's son is born as a snake. One day, he tells his father he wants to marry, and they bring him a bride. He bites her to death at night. This goes on for days, until they find him as bride an orphan girl that lives in such a place. The maiden goes to her mother's grave for advice and fearing for her life, but her mother's spirit tells her to commission a dress made of hedgehog skin before the wedding. It happens thus, and the girl marries the snake prince in the hedgehog skin dress. The snake boy enters the room and tries to lunge at her, but the thick garment rebuffs him with its quills. The snake tries in vain to attack the bride, who tells her mother about it. The mother's spirit advises her daughter to order the prince to undress, then to light up the brazier. The girl confronts the snake on another night, who demands her to remove the prickly dress, but the girl orders the prince to remove his snakeskin. It happens thus: the prince removes his snakeskin which the girl quickly burns. They spend the night together. After a while, the prince goes to war and sends letters from the battlefield. A servant falsified a letter with an order for the girl to leave and never come back, and the snake prince's wife follows through with the false order by going to the hills. The girl finds another man, marries him and has two sons with him. Back to the now human snake prince, he returns from war, learns his wife left due to the false letters, and goes after her by changing into a snake. He crawls all over Turkey and finds her with another husband. The second husband takes the snake as a guest and the prince resumes human form. The prince suggests that they light up the bathhouse, and to let the girl choose whom she will be with by dousing him with water. They do as suggested, and tell the girl to pour water on whoever she wishes to be with: she douses water on the second husband, father of her two children. The prince recognizes his defeat, turns into a snake, and leaves.

===== Black Snake (Yalvaç) =====
In a Turkish tale collected from an 85-year-old source named Mevlüt Göde, from Körküler, Yalvaç, with the title Siyah Yılan ("Black Snake"), a padishah has so son, so he prays to Allah for one, even he is a snake or a scorpion. Thus, the padishah's wife becomes pregnant and is ready to give birth, but her son, a snake, bits the midwives come to deliver him. A woman in the village has a stepdaughter she wants to get rid of and informs the padishah the girl can be the prince's midwife. The padishah sends for her, and she goes to cry on her mother's grave, fearing the snake son will bite her. The mother's spirit advises her to place a bowl of milk in front of the queen and the snake son will finally be born. It happens thus, and the padishah is joyous about his new son. Later, it is time for the child to learn the Sunna, but he bites the preceptors. The girl is brought to teach the prince and leaves. Lastly, the royal couple wants to marry the snake prince, so they bring a bride for him, but he kills her. The girl is ordered to present as the snake prince's bride, so she goes to her mother's grave. Her mother's spirit advises her to ask the padishah to send the hunter to capture foxes in the mountains and sew a garment from foxskin; during the wedding night, the prince will ask her to remove the fox dress, but she is to order him to remove his skins. The girl marries the snake prince and, on the wedding night, she orders the prince to remove his snakeskins, which turns him into handsome youth, then burns the snakeskins. The padishah celebrates his son turning human and his wedding. Sometime later, the prince decides to go on a journey and passes by seven gates. He sends a letter to a gatekeeper, who falsifies it to blame the girl for destroying the snakeskin and wanting her out of the palace. The girl shows the letter to the sultan and he bids her leave. The prince returns from his journey and questions about his wife's whereabouts, learning the false letter caused her to depart. Back to the girl, she is found by a Bey's son in the mountains who takes her home. The Bey's son has three sisters who are glad to see their brother's new wife. The Bey's son marries the girl and she gives birth to a boy. The prince turns into a snake to search for his wife in the mountains and eventually reaches the Bey's son castle, who is celebrating his child's birth. The Bey's son notices the prince at his door and asks the reason for his visit. The Bey's son says he found a girl in the mountains and suggests they should let her choose whom she wants to be with. The Beys son takes the prince in and the girl rejoices that her previous husband has found her. She leaves with the now human snake prince back to the palace.

===== Yılan Bey (Ankara) =====
In a Turkish tale collected from an informant in Polatlı district in Ankara, with the title Yılan Bey ("Snake Lord"), a padishah and his wife have no children. One day, he goes to make the morning prayers and prays to Allah for a son, even if he is a snake. Thus, his wife becomes pregnant. Months later, she is ready to give birth, but the midwives that are summoned to help die after they enter the room. A girl lives with her stepmother in the same country, and the woman lies to the padishah that her stepdaughter could help in the queen's delivery. The girl goes to her mother's grave to cry, and her mother's spirit advises her to place milk in a pot. She does as instructed and out comes a snake from the queen's womb into the cauldron of milk. Years later, the snake son is ready to be taught the letters, but his every mentor dies one by one. The stepmother sends the girl again to teach the prince, and she does so with her mother's advice. Finally, the snake son wants to be married, but every bride they marry him to wakes up dead the following morning. The stepmother sends the girl to the palace to marry the prince. Before the marriage, the girl goes to her mother's grave and her spirit advises her to wear forty layers of shirts, to mirror the snake prince's forty layers of snakeskin, and she should remove one layer as the prince takes off one of his. The girl marries Yilan Bey and removes a shirt on the wedding night, as the prince removes a snakeskin, until he removes all forty layers and becomes a handsome prince. Sometime later, Yilan Bey goes to war and leaves his wife unprotected, so the stepmother takes the girl on a trip on false pretences: she undresses her stepdaughter and abandons her in an open grave. The girl spends the night in a grave, and is rescued by a local man named Şahin Bey. The girl feels she is pregnant, but cannot say if the son is Yilan Bey's or Şahin Bey's, so she decides to remain with Şahin Bey for the time being, and bears him other children. Meanwhile, Yilan Bey goes in search of his wife, and finds her at Şahin Bey's palace after seven years. Yilan Bey says that the girl is his wife, but Şahin Bey does not want to forfeit her, so the girl has to make herself this choice. They enter a bathhouse and give the girl a bowl of water for her to drop at the feet of the man she will choose. She notices that she keeps Yilan Bey in her heart, but cannot abandon Şahin Bey and their children, who plead for her not to leave them. Thus, the girl chooses Şahin Bey between both men. Defeated, Yilan Bey turns back into a snake.

===== The Woman Who Gave Birth to a Snake =====
In a Turkish tale collected from an informant in Gemerek District, Sivas, with the title Yılan Doğuran Kadın ("The Woman Who Gave Birth to a Snake"), a woman has no child. One day, she sees a snake coiled in a ruin and sighs for her to have a son, even if he is a snake. She becomes pregnant and months later, is ready to give birth. Midwives come to help in the delivery, but the woman's son, the snake, bits them all in his mother's womb. Every midwife is killed, so there is no one else. In a neighbourhood, a person points to a girl that can help in the delivery. The girl learns of the harsh situation and worries for herself, when an old man comes to her door with advice: boil some milk in a pot, approach the woman with the pot and the snake will exit the womb, so she is to cover the pot with a cloth and leave it by the stove. It happens thus, and the snake son falls into the milk, then the girl runs back home. The snake grows next to the stove, and one day asks his mother to marry him. His mother questions him who would marry a snake, and the snake son mentions the girl who helped in his delivery. The girl learns she is propositioned to be the snake's bride, and the old man from before appears to her: she is to wear seven layers of clothing for herself and find seven for the snake bridegroom; she is to ask the snake to remove a layer of clothes, as she removes a layer of her own garments. The girl's requested clothes are brought, and the woman marries his son to the girl. On the wedding night, the girl and the snake each remove their clothes, and the snanke becomes a handsome young man, to everyone's happiness. Sometime later, the now human snake husband tells his mother to look after his wife, since he is leaving to work, and to never let her leave the house. After he leaves, a person falsifies a letter with mention of the girl going down an "evil path". The human snake writes back with a request to expel her from the house. His parents question that they never let her out of the house, but still follow his orders and expel her. The girl takes a bunch of beauty herbs from her in-laws' house and goes to a village, where she spends the night in a cemetery. The local padishah's son dies and is buried in the cemetery. The girl burns the herb and its fumes revive the padishah's son, and he goes to meet his saviour. The padishah's son, named Tiren Bağ, convinces her to live with him at the cemetery, and they spend the days begging and foraging for food. In time, the girl becomes pregnant and questions Tiren Bağ where she can give birth. Tiren Bağ sends her to his family's house and advises her to ask to be given shelter in the name of Tiren Bağ, in a small room near the oven. The girl follows his instructions: she is initially dismissed as a beggar by Tiren Bağ's parents, but she mentions his name and is allowed entrance. She gives birth to a son, and Tiren Bağ visits them at night. The maids inform the padishah about Tiren Bağ, who refuses to believe the story, but is convinced to spy on their guest: the following night, Tiren Bağ comes at night and laments that his wife and son are in such sorry state, and that if his parents knew, they would clothe them. The padishah overhears his son's words and reunites with him. The monarch welcomes his revived son and his wife and child at his palace. Back to the snake son, he returns home and learns of his wife's expulsion at his own request. The human snake decides to look for her and visits village after village, until he reaches Tiren Bağ's lands. The locals say there is a woman that looks like Yılan Bağ's, and he goes to meet Tiren Bağ. Yılan Bağ says that she is his wife, and Tiren Bağ says they should take the case to court. The teacher advises them to give her some salty flatbread, climb a mountain and wait with a cup of water in hand; whoever the girl goes to drink water, she is to be with him. It happens thus: she recognizes that she saved Tiren Bağ, but drinks from Yılan Bağ's cup and goes with her first husband.

===== Snake Son (Sivas) =====
In a Turkish tale collected from an informant in Sivas, with the title Yılan Oğlan ("Snake Son"), a family has a daughter, but want a son. The girl's mother is still childless, and prays to Allah for a son, even he is a snake. Thus, she gives birth to a snake son that crawls into a hole. People feel afraid, but the woman vouches for her son. Some twenty years pass, and the snake asks his elder sister to ask their parents to find him a bride. Despite some initial misgivings about their snake son, they find a bride for the snake son and marry the couple in a grand celebration. However, the snake kills the bride. The parents blame themselves for her death and bury her. Sometime later, the snake son asks his sister for them to find another bride. The second bride is also killed. The parents swear off finding any potential brides from any villages, and families promise not to give their daughter to the snake son. Despite this, the snake crawls out of his hole again and asks for another bride. The parents find a girl in a distant village, who agrees to marry the snake, but ask for a week to let her prepare for the wedding. During the week, she goes to meet some shepherds up the mountains and asks them to find hedgehog skins for her, which she asks a tailor to fashion a wedding dress for her. The girl goes to meet her snake bridegroom and lights up a brazier. The snake comes to her and lungs forward towards her body, but the hedgehog quills prickle his skin. The attack also chips off a shard from her teeth. The snake asks the girl to remove her dress, but the girl replies that he should remove his first. The snake removes his snakeskin and becomes a handsome youth. The girl quickly burns the snakeskin in the brazier. She removes the hedgehog skins dress and they spend the night together. His parents discover their son is now human and has not killed his latest bride.

Time passes, and the human snake has children with his wife. The girl's stepmother convinces the human snake to let his wife pay a visit to her family (stepmother, brother, and stepsister). When the human snake sends word that he is coming to fetch her, the stepmother orders the girl to remove her gold and pearls and go to a distant place to find some water to heal her sick brother. The girl leaves the house, and the human snake comes to take his wife back, but the stepmother tries to trick him by dressing her own daughter as his wife. Back to the girl, she takes a jug and loses her way somewhere away from her home, and as night falls, she finds a grave and leans her head on it. She begins to cry, when the grave opens and out comes another human person, who says he has been lost for seven years and people think he is dead. The girl says she has nowhere to go, so the stranger, called Bahri Bey, advises her to seek shelter at his family's house where she is to invoke for the sake of Bahri Bey. She follows his instructions, and is given shelter at his family's house. She declares she will sleep in his old room, which his sister allows her to do. At night, Bahri Bey comes in and talks to the girl. Bahri Bey's parents and sister hear Bahri Bey's voice and question the girl, who denies everything. Bahri Bey comes in again and is told that his parents are pressing her for answers, then tells her to simply admit she is talking to him. The following morning, the girl admits that Bahri Bey is her mysterious interlocutor, and his family realize he is alive. Bahri Bey tells them how to have him back: light up a fire in the square on Friday, and he will appear, finally released from the houris. Bahri Bey's family cannot thank the girl enough for bringing their son back, and treat her kindly. She marries Bahri Bey. One day, the human snake goes in search of his wife and eventually pays a visit to Bahri Bey's house. He recognizes his wife by her broken tooth, and he points that Bahri Bey's wife is his wife, admiting that the girl disenchated him. Bahri Bey recognizes that the girl released him from the grasp of the houris after seven years, and allows the human snake to have his wife back. The human snake reunites with his wife and takes her home, but prevents her from seeing her family.

===== Black Snake (Amasya) =====
In a Turkish tale collected from an informant from Gümüşhacıköy, Amasya, with the title Kara Yılan ("Black Snake"), a padishah is childless. One day a dervish gives him an apple to be shared with the queen. She gives birth to a black snake that bites and almost kills a midwife. The eunuchs looks for a nanny for the snake prince. A woman who hates her stepdaughter wants to get rid of the girl and offers the girl's services. The girl goes to her mother's grave for advice, and her spirit advises her to place milk in a box, lure the snake inside and close it. The girl does as instructed and presents the black snake to the padishah. Later, the snake prince wants to go to school, but he kills every teacher they bring him. The viziers advise that who helped the snake before can teach him now, so they look for the same girl. The girl goes to her mother's grave for advice, and her spirit tells her to gather forty-one rose sticks to beat the prince if he tries to attack her. Later, the black snake prince wants to be married, so they bring him a bride he kills on the first night. The padishah resorts to the girl who taught him. She goes to her mother's grave a third time, and her mother's spirit advises her to don forty hedgehog skins to prickle the prince if he tries to attack her, and for her to order him to remove his snakeskin, which she is to throw in a brazier as soon as he doffs it. On the wedding night, the prince tries to attack her, but the quills injure him, so he asks her to remove her dresses. The girl replies that he should remove his skin. The snake prince removes the snakeskin, which the girl tosses in the brazier to burn, turning the prince to human form. They spend the night together, and the monarchs are glad their son is human. Sometime later, the prince goes on a journey, and while he is away, some jealous servants falsify a letter with orders to kill the prince's bride. The padishah reads the letter and the girl spies on him, so she decides to escape from the palace first. She stumbles upon a tomb with a young man inside, lying on a coffin. The young man sees the girl and bids her hide, for a pigeon will come and try to kill her. The pigeon comes, does not see the girl, and leaves. The young man, named Bahtiyar, and the girl spend time in the coffin, and he reveals he is the local prince and the pigeon is his enemy, since the bird kidnapped him and placed him in the coffin. Bahtiyar returns home with the girl in tow and they live together. Back to the snake prince, he learns of the false letters and goes in search of his wife. He eventually goes to Bahtiyar's country and reunites with his wife. Prince Bahtiyar allows the girl to return to her former husband, since she saved his life. The snake prince returns home with his wife, and they celebrate another wedding for forty days and forty nights.

===== Dragon Lord (Sivas) =====
In a Turkish tale collected from an illiterate informant in Karacalar, Ulaş District, in Sivas, with the title Ejderha Bey ("Dragon Lord"), a padishah has no children. He comes across a little snake and sighs to Allah that he is childless, while even a snake has its young. For this, Allah gives him a strange son: a dragon ("ejderha", in the original). The dragon-prince grows up and attacks people. The padishah cannot control the wild son, so he tosses him in a well and feeds him with water and food, then starts bringing girls from villages to feed his monstrous son. The village calf herder's daughter is chosen, but he has three girls, one from his first wife and two from his second wife. The stepmother offers her stepdaughter to be sacrificed. The girl, whose mother has died, asks to be given a day to visit her mother's grave. She sleeps on the grave, and her mother appears in her dreams to help her: she is to ask for a sheep's skin with molasses, and go down the well with a knife and a match. The padishah indulges her and brings her to the dragon-prince in the well. He removes his snake coat and goes to devour the sheep's skin, while the girl lies in waiting. While the prince is distracted eating the offering, the girl strikes a match and burns the snake coat. The prince complains that the girl burned his snakeskin, but the girl admits she saved them both by doing so. They spend days in the well, and the monarchs wonder if something happened to her, then send for his soldier to investigate. They find a handsome youth and the girl, still alive. They rope them up and bring them to the padishah. The girl explains she saved the prince, and the padishah named him Ejderha, then marries him to the girl.

When the girl's stepmother learns of this, she pays a visit to the palace to see her son-in-law. The stepmother lies to Dragon Lord that her son is sick, so he should take his wife to her family's house for a visit. It happens thus, and while Snake Lord waits in the carriage, the stepmother undresses her stepdaughter and places them on her own daughter, and introduces her daughter as the Dragon Lord's wife. Dragon Lord suspects that this is not his wife, despite the stepmother's words. He accepts his returned "wife" for a while, but soon departs to search for her. Back to his wife, the girl decides to leave the country and wanders off until she reaches a palace atop a mountain. She enters the palace and sees a youth lying down. She wakes him up; the youth warns them that the peri maidens will come and kill them both, so he hides her inside a cupboard. The peri maidens fly in and sense a human smell, but the youth dismisses it as his own sweat. He manages to trick the peris and they leave. The boy and the girl live together in the palace, and she becomes pregnant. The youth, called Bahtiyar Bey, sends her to his parents' house in a nearby village, so that she can give birth in safety, and she is to ask for shelter in the name of Bahtiyar Bey. She goes down the village and reaches Bahtiyar Bey's parents' house and calls on his name. His parents let her in and place her inside a room. After some days, she gives birth to their son. She spends time there until their son is big enough, and decides to put into action Bahtiyar Bey's plan: near the village, three birds land in a lake, so she is to pour kerosene on some pieces of dung, let the birds smell it and faint, so Bahtiyar Bey can escape. The girl shares her plan with his parents, and they ready a pile of dung next to the lake. The three birds come to the lake, and they burn the dung, intoxicating the birds so they faint. Bahtiyar Bey takes the opportunity to escape the palace and returns to his parents, who celebrate their son's arrival. Meanwhile, Dragon Lord is still searching for his wife, and gets news of his wife: he goes to Bahtiyar Bey's house and recognizes his wife. Dragon Lord explains that Bahtiyar Bey's wife is his wife, for she disenchanted him, but Bahtiyar Bey says she also saved him and mothered their son. They keep arguing about it, until they decide to leave on a journey, both men ahead of the calf-herder's daughter and the baby. At one point, the girl feels tired and delivers Bahtiyar Bey's son to him, while she goes back with Dragon Lord to their own homeland.

===== Yilan Bey (Erzincan) =====
In a Turkish tale from Erzincan with the title Yılan Bey ("Snake Lord"), a nobleman has no children, despite being rich. He consults scholars and doctors, yet no answer. His wife sighs for Allah to give her a son, even if he is a snake. Thus, she becomes pregnant, and the nobleman prepares rams for the sacrifice. He, his wife and the midwife discover that the son is a snake that crawls into a hole, to their horror. Time passes, and they sense their house is quaking for three days. A sage consults a book and discerns that their snake son is causing the mansion to shake. The sage also says that the snake son wants to be married, but they question who would marry a snake. They bring first the Grand Vizier's daughter, bedecked as a bride, and find her dead the next day. Next, the younger vizier's daughter, and other brides end up dead in succession, given to the snake son. This causes many families to avoid delivering their daughters to the snake son, until they find an orphan available in a neighbourhood. Her stepmother gains some money and sells her stepdaughter to the nobleman. The girl runs to her mother's grave for comfort and says that she is being given to her death. Her mother's spirit advises her to ask the padishah for a dress made of hedgehog skins and a brazier, for he is a handsome youth under the snake; if he asks her to remove the dresses, she is to retort for him to remove his garments, then burn the snakeskin in the brazier. Hedgehog skins are gathered to be sewn in a dress, which the girl wears to the wedding night. On the wedding night, the snake asks the girl to remove the hedgehog skins, but she replies to him to remove his snakeskin. He does and warns her not to destroy it, but the girl burns it in a brazier. The servants find the girl alive and the snake son turned to human form, and his family celebrate a forty day and forty night wedding.

The stepmother learns of her stepdaughter's fortunate marriage to the noble's son and plots to ruin their marriage. The now human snake son and the girl have a son after a year, and the baby is five or six months old, the noble's son receives a draft letter for military service. He admonishes his wife for having destroyed his snakeskin, and the girl convinces him to fight for his homeland, since he is the padishah's son. He leaves the palace and asks his parents to look after them. He sends them letter from the battlefield. One day, the messenger stops to rest by the stepmother's house, and she falsifies a series of letters to have her stepdaughter banished from the royal palace. The padishah reads the letters and notices something strange about them, but Yilan Bey's wife decides to abandon the palace, leaving her son with his grandparents. She laments that she lost her mother, and leaves the city behind, walking into a dense forest. She stops to rest, when a bird perches on a branch and talks to her. They share their sorrows with each other, and the bird reveals he is a padishah's son, a prince named Aydan Günden Güzel, whose mother made a wish to have a son that turned into a bird and flew away. The bird becomes human and lives with the girl in the forest, with him fetching food and drink. Eventually, she becomes pregnant, and the bird-prince guides her to his mother's house, where she is to take shelter as a beggar, call on the name of Aydan Günden Güzel, and not mention his name.

The girl goes to Aydan Günden Güzel's house, but the servants dismiss her as a beggar. When she mentions Aydan Günden Güzel's name, his mother orders the servants to let the girl in. She is given accommodations in a coal cellar and gives birth to her second son. Aydan Günden Güzel perches on the window in bird form and asks about his son, who is lying in shabby accommodations. Servants sleep in the same room as the girl and overhear her conversation with the bird, frightening them. So Aydan Günden Güzel's mother asks her to be moved out to her room. Aydan Günden Güzel flies in again and asks about his son, who is now in better lodging. By doing so, Aydan Günden Güzel enters his mother's room, and reunites with his mother, his child and the girl. They celebrate their return with a grand wedding. Back to Yilan Bey, he returns from war and learns about the falsified letters and his wife's exile. He goes in search of her and reaches Aydan Günden Güzel's kingdom. He notices the other prince's son and realizes the resemblance between the boy and his wife. Yilan Bey asks Aydan Günden Güzel that they have the same woman, and talk to her that she should choose one of them. She says that she has a child with each one, and cannot decide. They bring the case to a judge, who advises them to give their common wife salty food and ride along a road with water in hand; whoever she reaches for to ask for water is the one she should be with. It happens thus, and the girl chooses Yilan Bey. Aydan Günden Güzel realizes he never had the girl, places his son with her on his horse back to his parents, turns into a bird and flies back with the peris. Yilan Bey returns home and punishes his stepmother-in-law by tying her to forty mules.

===== Snake Falcon and Tilli Yusuf =====
In a Turkish tale collected from informant Elmas Çavuş, from Nigde, with the title Yılan Şahin ile Tilli Yusuf ("Snake Falcon and Tilli Yusuf"), a woman has no children, so she prays to Allah for a child, even if he is a snake or other animal. Thus, a snake is born to her. When the snake son is fifteen, he demands a bride from his parents. The parents bring a bride for him, but he kills her. Sometime later, he asks for another bride, and they bring another maiden for him to marry and kill. Since these bride were daughters of rich people, the parents decide to bring a cattle herder's daughter, since no one else is willing to give up their daughters. The girl cries for her fate, when a dervish appears to her and advises her to ask for a seven-story house and seven layers of clothing before she marries the snake son. The girl has the house built and marries the snake son. On the wedding night, the girl orders her snake husband, called Yilan Shahin, to remove a layer of his clothes, while she removes one of the layers she is wearing. After both remove their garments, the girl disenchants Yilan Shahin to human form, as he becomes a handsome man. However, the parents of the dead brides learn of the third girl's successful marriage and plot revenge against the family: they send a sorceresses to the cattle herder's daughter's house. The sorceress tricks the girl to leave the house and go to a place with roses and other flowers, and locks her up in the ruins. As for Yilan Shahin, he learns that his wife is missing and goes in search of her.

Back to the girl, in the ruins, some jinns come with an object; the jinns utter a magic spell over the object, turning him into a human person called Tilli Yusuf, who plays with the jinns. When their playtime is over, the jinns transform him back, and leave the ruins. The girl takes Tilli Yusuf's object form, utters the same spell and restores him to human form. The girl says she a human, servant of Allah, trapped by the sorceress, and Tilli Yusuf reveals that he was stolen from his cradle by the jinns and kept as their prisoner, and his parents cannot find him. The girl asks what she can do to help him, and Tilli Yusuf tells her to ask his parents to build a house of razor blades, after she goes to his parents' house. In time, the girl becomes pregnant by Tilli Yusuf, who sends her to his parents' house. She knocks on the door and is given shelter as a slave. Tilli Yusuf's mother gives her lodge in meager accommodations: with a rag and a cloth for pillow. At night, Tilli Yusuf enters the room in the form of a dove and perches by the window, asking her about her accommodations. Tilli Yusuf tells her to ask her parents to place their child in his silk wrapping and in his mattress, and ask for the house of razor blades. A female servant overhears the exchange and informs Tilli Yusuf's mother, who moves the girl and the baby to a better location. Tilli Yusuf's parents build the house of razor blades, and Tilli Yusuf flies in the house, pursued by the jinns in dove form. While the youth waits inside, the pigeons break off a leg of the house. Tilli Yusuf is rescued. Meanwhile, Yilan Shahin learns of the incident and goes to Tilli Yusuf's house, explaining that the girl disenchanted him, and Tilli Yusuf says that she saved him from the jinns. Upon not reaching an agreement, the trio consult a government official, who suggests them to give the girl a bowl of water and for them to sit on stones; whoever she pours out the water will represent her choice. It happens thus: the girl tells Yilan Shahin that the decision is his, but her heart it there, so she pours out the water over Tilli Yusuf's head. Yilan Shahin leaves defeated and in tears, while Tilli Yusuf and the girl celebrate their marriage for forty days and forty nights.

===== Stepmother =====
In a Turkish tale titled Üvey Ana ("Stepmother"), a girl lives with her stepmother and father, but the stepmother hates her. Meanwhile, a childless sultan and his wife are walking in the garden, when they sight a snake and they pray to "Rabbi" (Allah) for a child, even if he is a snake. Thus, the queen becomes pregnant. A midwife comes to help in the delivery, but her snake son bites her to death. Many midwives are brought to help, but the snake bites them all, until there are no more left. The sultan issues a proclamation for anyone to help in his son's delivery in exchange for a reward, and the stepmother mentions her stepdaughter. The sultan sends for the girl, when she asks to visit her mother's grave to recite a Fatiha for her. In tears she confides in her mother's spirit, and her mother's voice advises her to ask for a golden basin and a golden bowl with milk, a fur coat, and to tell the prince to not be afraid. The girl does as instructed, and the snake son is finally born, enters the golden bowl to wash himself, and rests on the fur coat. The girl returns home and the stepmother complains that she is not dead. Years later, the prince grows up and wants to be educated. The monarchs send in tutors for their son, but he bites them all, so the town crier announces the sultan is seeking a tutor for the snake prince with the promise of a reward. The stepmother offers her stepdaughter again, and the girl goes to her mother's grave for solace. Her mother's voice comes from the grave with advice: request a golden lectern, place the Quran on it, then utter the word "Bismillahirrahmanirrahim", and the prince will learn by himself. It happens thus, and the girl teaches the snake prince the letters and is rewarded by the sultan and his wife. The stepmother complains again that her stepdaughter is still not dead. Years pass, and the snake prince wants to be married. The sultan marries him to the vizier of the right's daughter in a forty-day and forty-night celebration, and he bites her to death on the bridal chambers. They bury the bride, and he wants another. He marries a second time, with the vizier of the left's daughter, whom he bites to death. Other brides are killed in succession, until there are no girls left. The stepmother offers her own stepdaughter as bride, since she was the prince's midwife and teacher. The girl goes to her mother's grave and she gives her more advice: ready a brazier and hide behind a door; when the snake enters, toss him and his snakeskin in the fire, and she will be safe. The girl marries the snake and throws him in the fire, just as her mother instructed, and turns him into a handsome "lion-like" human prince.

The sultan and the queen have a coffin prepared already for the bride, but find the girl safe and sound, and thank her for being the prince's midwife and tutor. After a period of peace and happiness, war breaks out, and the sultan has to go to war. However, the now human snake prince offers to go in his father's stead. After he leaves, the sultan takes care of his daughter-in-law, and the stepmother learns of her stepdaughter's fortune and plots to destroy her: she falsifies a letter from the prince accusing his wife of being an enemy and asking his parents to banish her. The sultan and the queen receive the letter, question the orders, since the girl has been kind to them, but place the letter under her pillow. The girl is asleep, when a governess finds the letters and gives to the princess. She reads the letter and a storm blows her away from the palace to the wilderness, on a mountaintop. She finds a pearl-studded tent with a Beyoglu (a Bey's son) asleep inside, a wax candle by his head and an oil candle by his feet. She eats his food and hides under the bed, then he wakes up and comments with his nanny about who ate his food. He plots with the nanny to discover who is the strange guest, and places some snow near his head for the candle to melt and wake him up. The girl goes to eat more food and is caught by the Beyoglu, who asks her about her identity. She says she is human, and spends some time with him. The Beyoglu receives a letter from his father that he should return to marry his betrothed after his sabbatical on the mountain, and leaves the girl in the tent, with some rose and daffodils and a note on his bedside. After the Beyoglu leaves, the girl wakes up, sees the flowers near her, and recite a rhyme, asking the roses and daffodils what they did to her beloved. She goes down the mountain, trades the tent with a shepherd for his clothes and walks after the Beyoglu's caravan. The Beyoglu, thinking her to be a man, asks "him" what sights he saw on the road, and the girl, in disguise, answers "he" saw sights like the pearl-studded tent inside with a girl bemoaning herself and singing the verses of the roses and daffodils. The Beyoglu amuses himself with the shepherd's stories and takes him as his friend, then marries his betrothed bride in a forty-day and a forty-night celebration. The girl, still wearing the male disguise, goes to the garden and hangs herself. Meanwhile, the Beyoglu, worrying about his dervish friend, goes to check on "him" and find the corpse hanging from the tree. He takes a look at "his" face and realizes "he" is the girl he met by the tent. Two birds perched on a hilltop start to talk, and Beyoglu overhears them, since he knows the language of the birds: the girl is alive, but unconscious, and can be revived by plucking some of their feathers, burning them and smearing the fumes near her nose. Beyoglu does as the birds instructed and revives the girl, acknowledging her as his true beloved. Beyoglu introduces the girl to his parents as his bride, sends the other maiden back home, and marries the girl he met at the tent. The tale was first collected in Ayaş from seventy-year-old informant Aliye, in 1940, who first heard it from her grandmother when she was eleven.

===== Nigâr and Bahtiyar =====
In a Turkish tale from Bünyan, Kayseri, with the title Nigâr ile Bahtiyar ("Nigâr and Bahtiyar"), collected from an informant named Mehmet Cingillioğlu by author S. Burhanettin Akbaş, a sultan is childless and his wife prays to Allah for a son, even if one side of his face is of a snake and the other of a human. Thus, nine months later, she becomes pregnant. However, the prince cannot be born, since he kills any midwife that approaches his mother's body. A woman mentions that her stepdaughter spent time with midwives, so she can help in the prince's delivery. The girl goes to her mother's grave for counsel, and her mother's spirit advises her to fetch a pair or tongs in the sultan's kitchen, heat the tongs, cool in a yellow cow's milk and grab the serpent from the womb. It happens thus, and the snake son, drawn by the smell of milk, and is born. The sultan rewards the girl with some gold. Next, the snake prince wants to read and learn; the sultan brings tutors for the prince, but he kills everyone. The stepmother suggests they bring the girl again. The girl goes to her mother's grave again, and her spirit advises her to fetch a golden Quran from the sultan's cabinet, give it to him, and teach him in ten days' time. It happens thus. Lastly, the snake prince wants to be married, but every bride that is brought to him he kills. The stepmother mentions the girl who educated and nurtured the prince, so she can be given to him. The girl runs to her mother's grave and explains her plight; her mother's spirit advises her to ask for a brazier in the wedding room, and he will tell her to undress, but she cannot do so, for he will kill her if she does; so she is to ask him to remove the filthy shift, which she is to toss into the brazier to burn. The girl does as instructed and asks the snake prince to remove his shift; he swells up and occupies the entire space of the room to mark his dominance, but the girl repeats her request. The prince removes his shift, which the girl tosses in the brazier, and both to sleep. The following morning, the monarchs fear the girl may have died, but she exits the chambers and asks for some clothes for her husband, now that he is human. The prince goes to meet his parents, and they rejoice that their son is human, thanking their daughter-in-law for this.

Time passes, and the now human prince leaves to study, so that he can succeed his father on the throne. While the prince is away, the girl and the queen go to the palace roof for some air, when suddenly a male peri flies in and captures the girl, then takes her away. The male peri lands near a village, between a rock and a thicket and declares that the girl shell be his. The male peri and the girl become husband and wife. Back to the human prince, he writes letters back home to ask about how fares his wife, but his parents write evasive answers. He returns home and asks his parents about her; they reveal what happened to her. The prince cries for his missing wife, and sets off on a journey to look for her, gathering flowers on the way. Back to the peri, the girl laments that the peri kidnapped her. The male peri then points to a house, and explains that the house belongs to his parents, from whom he was kidnapped by the peris (fairies) when he was just forty days old; she is to ask for shelter, say the basmala and beg for the sake of Bahtiyar, taken when he was forty days old. The girl does as instructed and arrives at Bahtiyar's parents' house, where she asks for shelter, now that she is pregnant. Bahtiyar's mother places her in an empty room. At night, Bahtiyar perches on the windowsill and asks the girl, named Nigar, asks how fare she and the child. He departs, but leaves her provisions (food, gold, and precious gems). A servant informs Bahtiyar's mother about the voices in the night, and they spy on Nigar through a hole in the wall. Bahtiyar returns and asks Nigar about her and their child, if his parents heard him. Nigar says that they did not. Bahtiyar flies away again, but this time Bahtiyar's mother moves Nigar and the child to Bahtiyar's former room. Bahtiyar returns a third night, and learns that his parents heard him and moved the girl and their child to his room.

Bahtiyar's mother enters the room and confronts him. Bahtiyar warns his mother about the dangers the peris pose: they might burn their mansion, since they are cruel. His mother defiantly tells him to let them come. For this, Bahtiyar plots with his mother how to defeat the peris: have his father surround the mansion with swords and fill thespaces between them with straw and refuse, then burn the line of swords; when the smoke rises, Bahtiyar will cry out that his father's mansion is on fire, then he will hide under his mother's cloak; Bahtiyar's peri mother-in-law and peri wife will come to look for him, strike the swords and die. By doing so, Bahtiyar turns into a dove and hides under his mother's cloak, and watches as some of the peris come to rescue Bahtiyar from the fire and destroy themselves in the swords and in the flames, including his peri mother-in-law and peri wife. Freed of the peri form, Bahtiyar resumes human form and lives with his parents, Nigar and their son. Back to the human snake prince, he reaches Bahtiyar's mansion and explains the reason for his journey: he has tracked his wife to this house, after years. Bahtiyar replies that he and Nigar have two children and she rescued him. They bring the case before a gathering and each makes up their case. The assembly sets up a test: have two cups prepared, one with honey sherbet and another with water; if the girl chooses the honey, she is to be with Bahtiyar; if she chooses water, she will remain with the snake prince. They blindfold Nigar, and she chooses the water cup three times, confirming her decision. Nigar says her goodbyes to Bahtiyar's family, saying that their son kidnapped her, but she still loves her previous husband, and leaves with him.

===== From the Uysal-Walker Archive =====
In Turkish tale archived in the Uysal–Walker Archive of Turkish Oral Narrative with the title Fatma, Yilan-Bey, and Sinan-Bey, collected from informant Nuriye Hoca, from Kastamonu Province, a padishah is childless and his wife has longed for a son for a long time, until she becomes pregnant. However, after nine months, she cannot give birth, so they send for the midwives in Istanbul, but none can help her, and instead die after each time. Town criers announce for a midwife, and a woman offers her own stepdaughter, Fatma, as the queen's midwife, since all the others have died. Fatma is brought to the padishah and asks for a basin of milk. A snake leaves the queen's womb - it is the padishah's son, who is fed with milk and wrapped in swaddling clothes. Some time later, the padishah leaves for war, and, in his absence, the viziers plot to get rid of the snake prince. They bring back the midwife who advises that the prince cannot be chained, and asks them to give him a room for space. After seven years, the snake grows even larger, and the viziers send for the girl again. The girl, who visited her mother's grave for counsel, (Note: The collector recognized that in the tale the heroine visits her mother's grave for help, but in the story the episode was shortened.) since her mother was an ermiș, interprets that the prince is ready to be circumcided, and offers her help: with her mother's advice, she cuts off a handspan from the prince's tailside. Fifteen years later, the prince becomes a large monster, and they send for Fatma again, who goes to her mother's grave for advice. Her mother's spirit tells her to not be afraid. Fatma goes to talk to the padishah that his son wants to be married, and she offers herself as his bride, since the padishah questions who would want to marry a large snake. Fatma commissions forty dresses made of hedgehog skin and dons them during the wedding night. The snake prince approaches her and nudges her, and she tells him she will remove a dress if he undresses too. After the prince removes forty layers of skin and Fatma the forty porcupine dresses, the snake prince has turned into a handsome human youth. The following morning, the padishah goes to knock on the couple's door at the morning call for prayer (ezan), and Fatma asks for clothes for both of them. The padishah is happy that his son is a normal human, and Fatma-hanim and Yilan-bey leave the room to meet the monarch.

After a month of happiness, Yilan-bey is called to military service, leaving his wife Fatma with his parents. Fatma and Yilan-bey go to her stepmother's house to say his goodbyes. Once there, he goes to the toilet, and Fatma's stepmother steals the seal off his jacket. A week later, Fatma's stepmother writes a false letter with Yilan-bey's seal with orders to expel Fatma from their house. The padishah reads the letter, but hides its contents from Fatma. The stepmother sends a second and a third letter to the monarch, who finally shows its contents to Fatma. She decides to leave the palace in tears and wanders to the mountains. Fatma comes across a large box-shaped tomb with a youth inside, Sinan-Bey. She meets him and asks the reason for being trapped there: Sinan-Bey reveals that he is the son of a bey who finally had a child (him) after sacrificed nine sheep; however, he was stolen when he was just seven days old and lived like this for seventeen years; his captors allow him to leave for a while to smell his parents just outside their house near the chimney. (Note: According to the collector, in Turkish fairy tales and "in real life" relatives can recognize each other by scent.) Fatma and Sinan-Bey spend time together and live like a married couple. After some time, she becomes pregnant and Sinan-Bey directs her to his parents' house so that she can give birth in safety: she is to reach a certain village, stand near a fountain near a house, wait for an Arab nurse and tell her she is pregnant with Sinan-Bey's child. It happens thus, and Fatma meets the Arab nurse. The Arab nurse goes to talk to her mistress, the Sinan-Bey's mother who has grieved for her missing son for years, and she gives Fatma shelter. In time, she gives birth to a son. Sinan-Bey takes the opportunity to visit his parents and asks Fatma how she fares at his parents' house: she tells him she is living in the stables, sleeping on a straw mat with a rag for sheet and eating only soup. Sinan laments this and shames his parents. The Arab nurse informs the lady of the event. On the third time Sinan visits Fatma, the Arab nurse brings the lady to overhear the conversation: Sinan laments that Fatma is sleeping in such meagre conditions, and not on his golden cradle and silver bed. Sinan's mother recognizes her son's voice, and immediately moves Fatma and the child to better accommodations. The next time Sinan visits, Fatma confirms she has better accommodations. His mother and the other women decide to rescue Sinan, and place some red clay in the fireplace. After he returns one more time, he smells it and is able to return home to be with his family.

Back to Yilan-Bey, he returns home from military service and learns of the false letters, then asks where is his wife Fatma. He deduces that his stepmother-in-law stole his seal and decides to go look for her. At last he reaches a large house where Fatma is living. He meets Sinan-Bey, who has now two sons, and tells the other his lifestory. Sinan-Bey realizes he is Fatma's first husband, and goes to talk to her. Sinan-Bey tells her she can choose who she wants to be with. Fatma tells she will go with Yilan-Bey, her first love, and leaves her two sons with Sinan-Bey, who respects her decision. Fatma and Yilan-Bey return home and live happily.

=== Other regions ===
==== Bulgarian Turks ====
Linguist Gyula Németh collected a tale from the Turkish population of Vidin, Bulgaria, with the German title Evrem Bej ("Evrem Bey"), which was translated as "Эврем-бей" ("Evrem-Bey"). In this tale, a girl lives with her parents and goes to school. One day, she tells her female teacher she likes her, and the teacher says she could be her new mother if the girl kills the current one: she can slam the lid of a trunk on her head. It happens thus and the teacher becomes the girl's stepmother, but begins to mistreat her. In another country, a padishah's daughter-in-law is already in labour, but her baby is killing all midwives. The padishah's wife goes on a journey and meets the teacher, to whom she confides her problem. The stepmother suggests her stepdaughter can serve as midwife to the still unborn prince. The padishah's wife agrees to take her. The girl cries for her fate on her mother's grave, and her mother's ghost, holding no grudge for her killing, advises her: she is to ask for gloves and aprons made of hedgehog skin. The prince is delivered. Some time later, the monstrous prince wants to be schooled, and the stepmother suggests the girl becomes his tutor. The girl goes to her mother's grave and is advised to put on a similar outfit to teach him. Later still, the prince wants to get married, and yet again the stepmother suggests the girl becomes his bride, in hopes of him killing her. This time, the girl's mother's ghost advises her to put on 40 layers of clothes: thirty-nine made of hedgehog skin and one bridal dress, which she is take off one by one, while requesting the prince to do the same to his skins. On the wedding night, the girl does as instructed and disenchants Evrem-Bey to human form. Now in human form, he joins the army and goes to war, leaving his wife at his father's care. Meanwhile, the stepmother falsifies a letter from Evrem-Bey with a command to kill his wife. The padishah receives the letter, but decides to spare the girl, gives her some money and expels her from the castle. The girl then wanders off until she reaches a cemetery with an open tomb: inside lives a youth who has been kidnapped by the peris. The girl and the youth live together and she becomes pregnant. Near the time of the child's birth, the youth asks his wife to go to his parents and have their baby there. The girl knocks on the door to his parents' home and is given shelter. After the baby is born, two doves perch by the window and they comment that, if his curse was lifted, he would rock his son in a golden crib. The youth's mother is alerted about the doves and catches the one that is her son, but he warns her he cannot stay by the morning, lest he dies. And so he dies with the crowing of the rooster. The woman blames her daughter-in-law for killing her son and orders her to find a water of life to revive him. The girl exits the house and, after following two buckets drawing water from the Earth, meets some devs who help her in this mission. Back to Evrem-Bey, he returns from war and is told about the false letter and his wife's second husband. Evrem-Bey complains to the mufti, and the mufti leaves the decision to the girl. The girl answers she loves both men, but chooses Evrem-Bey. According to the translator, "Evrem" is a word meaning 'dragon, monster'. In another article, Németh stated that the first part of the "widespread Anatolian tale" was "identical" to Evrem Bey, from Vidin.

==== Syrian Turkmen ====
In a Syrian Turkmen tale titled Analıkla Öksüz Kız ("The Stepmother and the Orphan Girl"), collected from informant Havle Yusuf, a padishah has an expecting queen. Midwives are brought to deliver the prince, bur somehow they keep dying one by one. A stepmother goes to the padishah to offer her stepdaughter's services as midwife, intent on getting rid of her. The padishah brings the girl and orders her to act as midwife to the prince. She runs to her mother's grave to cry, and "by Allah's command", her motehr's voice appears from the tomb and advises her to place a pail of milk next to the queen. She does so and a snake leaves her womb, drinks and milk and lies to sleep. Next, the snake prince grows up and wants to be taken for a walk, but no one can manage it. The girl's stepmother offers her stepdaughter to walk the prince. She takes a pail of milk to the garden, walks the prince to tire him out, and lets him drink milk. Lastly, the prince reaches marriageable age and asks his parents to be married. The stepmother offers her stepdaughter as bride to the snake, believing that the snake will bite the girl to death. However, the girl marries the snake prince, who removes his snakeskin at midnight to become a handsome youth and returns to the animal disguise in the morning. One day, the queen asks the girl about her marital life, and she reveals the prince's secret. The queen then conspires with the girl for her to light a fire and the girl to steal the snakeskin and burn it. It happens thus, and the prince, called Yusuf, asks his wife why she did so, and she explains she did it to avoid people's gossip. Sometime later, war breaks out and the prince joins the battle, leaving his pregnant wife at home. However, the prince, Südü Yusuf, dies in the war, and the padishah and his wife learn of the news. The queen then questions how her daughter-in-law could be pregnant and the monarchs expel her. The girl, pregnant, wanders around asking about her husband Südü Yusuf. She eventually reaches a garden, where a crow perches on a tree nearby. The girl spends some days in the garden and is ready to go into labour. The crow, who the story explains is a handsome youth cursed to be a crow, goes to look for help, flies to the Sultan's house and pecks at the door to call their attention. Meanwhile, the girl has given birth to twins alone in the garden, a boy and a girl. Back to the crow, he keeps pecking at his mother's door until the queen notices the bird's strange behaviour and decides to follow it. The sultan's wife goes to the garden, finds the girl and her twins, and places then in a hovel. The crow flies in to check on the girl's lodgings, and the girl answers they are wearing rags and scraps and sleeping on a mudbrick pillow. The crow laments that his cruel mother has not taken pity on the poor girl, which the sultan's wife overhears. She then moves the girl and the babies to better lodgings. The crow returns, asks the girl how she fares, and is glad his mother moved her to better lodgings. The sultan's wife captures the crow, learns of his story, and works to disenchant him to human form. Back to the human snake prince, he returns from war and asks where is his wife. His parents say they expelled her, and Südü Yusuf goes to look for her. He collects flowers and roses and becomes a flower-seller. He eventually reaches his wife's location and offers roses in exchange for a smile. She does not realize this is her husband, but he recognizes she is his wife by a missing tooth, and announces he is her husband. He then takes his family home with him.

== See also ==
- The Stepdaughter and the Black Serpent
- The Girl With Two Husbands (Greek fairy tale)
- Dragon-Child and Sun-Child (Armenian tale)
- Mimikakliu (Albanian folktale)
- Champavati (Indian tale)
- The Enchanted Snake (Italian tale)
- The King of the Snakes
- The Story of the Hamadryad
- The Origin of the Sirenia
