= Armaxa =

Town of ancient Cappadocia

Coordinates: 39°11′07″N 36°04′30″E

Armaxa, also known as Armaza, was a town of ancient Cappadocia, inhabited in Roman times.

Its site is located near Gemerek, Asiatic Turkey.
