= Döllük =

Döllük may refer to:

- Döllük, Mustafakemalpaşa
- Döllük, Şarkışla
