= Sivrialan =

Village in Sivas Province, Turkey

- Village
- Location in Turkey Sivrialan (Turkey Central Anatolia)
- Coordinates: 39.46°N 36.16°E
- Country: Turkey
- Province: Sivas
- District: Şarkışla
- Population (2023): 125
- Time zone: UTC+3 (TRT)

Sivrialan is a village in Şarkışla, a district of Sivas Province, Turkey. It was known as Söbüalan until 1928, when the name was changed so as to sound less 'foreign'. The village is located near the Kızılırmak River, and is an Alevi village.

Located in the Emlek region, which is prominent for its strong minstrel tradition, Sivrialan was historically home to many famous folk poets, or ashiks, of whom the most famous was Âşık Veysel, the 20th century poet and bağlama (saz) player. Others included Fadime (19th century), Ali Güç, Hıdır Güç, Veysel Kaymak, Bekir Sami Bozkurt, and Mehmet İmran (early-late 20th century, Veysel's contemporaries, most of whom studied saz poetry from him).

== History ==
The history of the village is not well known. According to the village elders, Sivrialan was founded by a man named Ağa and his family, who came from the neighboring village of Hardal. It was further populated by migrations from the neighbouring village of Kaledibi in Divriği Province, and from Zara Akdede (Cimilti) village.
