= Deliktaş Tunnel =

- Interactive map of Deliktaş Tunnel

Overview
- Other name: Deliktaş Tüneli
- Location: Deliktaş, Kangal, Sivas Province, Turkey
- Coordinates: 39°20′02″N 37°13′29″E
- Status: Operational
- System: Turkish State Railways (TCDD)

Operation
- Work began: November 15, 1973
- Opened: Late 2012
- Operator: TCDD
- Character: Single track railway tunnel

Technical
- Length: 5,473 m (3.401 mi)
- Tunnel clearance: 6.5 m (21 ft)
- Width: 5 m (16 ft)

Location of Deliktaş Tunnel in Turkey.

The Deliktaş Tunnel (Turkish: Deliktaş Tüneli), a.k.a. Kangal-Deliktaş Tunnel, is a railway tunnel near Deliktaş village between Ulaş and Kangal districts of Sivas Province in Central Anatolia, Turkey. It was built to shorten and to ease the ramp on the railway line connecting Sivas with Malatya and Erzincan. The construction began on November 15, 1973, however its progression was quite slow until 2003 when the Turkish State Railways (TCDD) took over the project. Although the works at the tunnel were completed in 2006, works for the infrastructure on the railway line around the tunnel began only in 2009. At the end of 2011, all construction works were finished. Following the installation of signalization facilities, and completing the test runs with freight trains, the tunnel was put into service in late 2012.

The tunnel was drilled by the New Austrian Tunnelling method (NATM). With its length of 5,473 m (3.401 mi), the Deliktaş Tunnel is Turkey's longest single track railway tunnel. The tunnel is 5 m (16 ft) wide and has a clearance of 6.5 m (21 ft). It is also the only railway tunnel of the country, which features built-in lighting, ventilation and firefighting facilities. The automated lighting system controls tunnel lights installed at every 20 m (66 ft) through motion detectors. According to official records, a total of 5,330 people worked for the construction that lasted 39 years, while eight workers died in accidents during this time.

The Deliktaş Tunnel serves also to contribute to the transportation of iron ore from Divriği mine to steel works in a more economic way. The tunnel helped to reduce the travel time of railbus service between Sivas and Divriği from five hours to two hours and 16 minutes.
