= Bostankaya, Ulaş =

Bostankaya
- Village
- Location within Turkey Location within Turkey Central Anatolia
- Coordinates: 39°30′42″N 37°00′55″E
- Country: Turkey
- Province: Sivas
- District: Ulaş
- Population (2022): 181
- Time zone: UTC+3 (TRT)
- Postal code: 58160
- Area code: 0346

Bostankaya is a village in Ulaş District, in Sivas Province, Turkey. Its population was 181 in 2022.

== Population ==
Historical population
Year	Pop.	±% p.a.
2007	254	—
2012	196	−5.05%
2017	187	−0.94%
2022	181	−0.65%
Source: TÜIK (2007-2022)
