= Şarkışla District =

District of Sivas Province, Turkey

- District
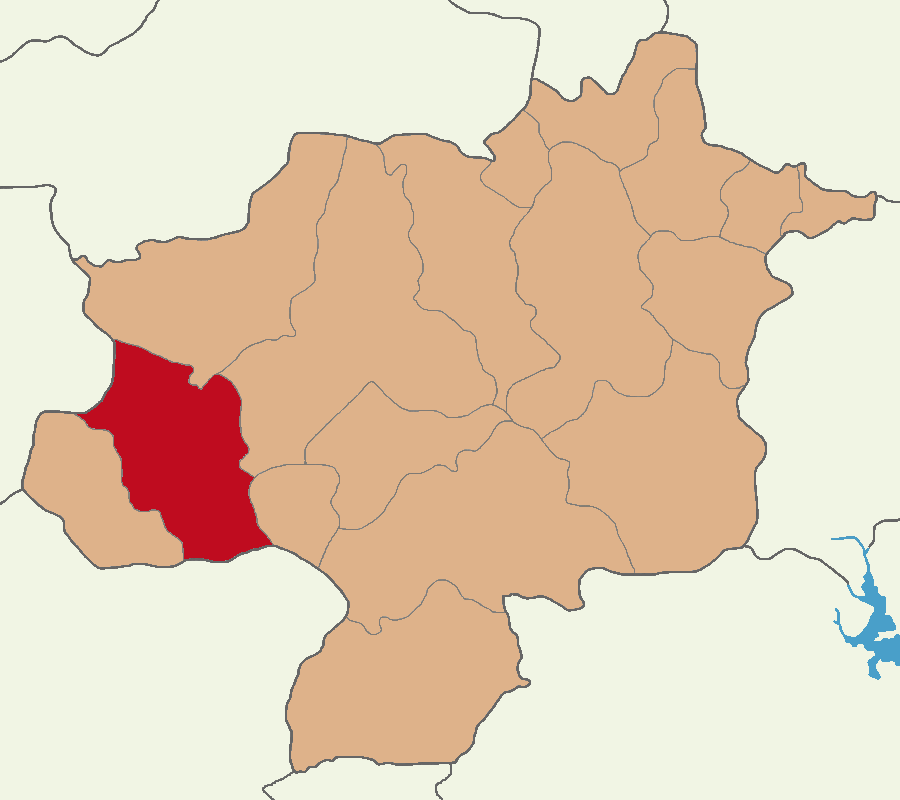
- Map showing Şarkışla District in Sivas Province

- Location in Turkey Şarkışla District (Turkey Central Anatolia)
- Coordinates: 39°21′N 36°24′E
- Country: Turkey
- Province: Sivas
- Seat: Şarkışla

Government
  - Kaymakam: Gökhan Dolaş
- Area: 2,073 km^{2} (800 sq mi)
- Population (2022): 37,409
  - Density: 18/km^{2} (47/sq mi)
- Time zone: UTC+3 (TRT)
- Website: www.sarkisla.gov.tr

Şarkışla District is a district of the Sivas Province of Turkey. Its seat is the town of Şarkışla. Its area is 2,073 km^{2}, and its population is 37,409 (2022).

== Composition ==
There are three municipalities in Şarkışla District:

- Cemel
- Gürçayır
- Şarkışla

There are 95 villages in Şarkışla District:

- Abdallı
- Ahmetli
- Akçakışla
- Akçasu
- Alaçayır
- Alaman
- Alıkören
- Arıklar
- Bağlararası
- Bahçealan
- Baltalar
- Başağaç
- Başören
- Benlihasan
- Beyyurdu
- Bozkurt
- Burnukara
- Büyüktopaç
- Büyükyüreğil
- Çamlıca
- Canabdal
- Çanakçı
- Çatalyol
- Çekem
- Çiçekliyurt
- Demirboğa
- Demirköprü
- Dikili
- Dökmetaş
- Döllük
- Elmalı
- Emlakkaracaören
- Fakılı
- Faraşderesi
- Gaziköy
- Gücük
- Gülören
- Gümüştepe
- Hardal
- Harunköy
- Hocabey
- Hüyükköy
- İğdecik
- İğdeliören
- İğecik
- İlyashacı
- Kahvepınar
- Kalecik
- Kaleköy
- Kapaklıpınar
- Karacaören
- Karakuz
- Kavakköy
- Kayapınar
- Kaymak
- Kazancık
- Kevenli
- Kılıççı
- Kışlaköy
- Kızılcakışla
- Kömürkaya
- Konakyazı
- Konalga
- Küçüktopaç
- Küçükyüreğil
- Kümbet
- Maksutlu
- Mengensofular
- Mescit
- Mezraa
- Oluktaş
- Ortaköy
- Ortatopaç
- Örtülü
- Osmanpınarı
- Otluk
- Polatpaşa
- Samankaya
- Saraç
- Sarıçiçek
- Sarıkavak
- Sarıkaya
- Sarıtekke
- Sivrialan
- Sultanköy
- Tavladere
- Temecik
- Uçuk
- Üyük
- Yahyalı
- Yalanı
- Yapracık
- Yeniyapan
- Yunusören
- Yükselen
