= Örenyurt =

- Village
- Location within Turkey Location within Turkey Central Anatolia
- Coordinates: 39°26′56″N 36°07′41″E
- Country: Turkey
- Province: Sivas
- District: Gemerek
- Population (2022): 79
- Time zone: UTC+3 (TRT)

Örenyurt is a village in Gemerek District, in Sivas Province, Turkey. Its population is 79 (2022). Örenyurt is the northernmost place in Gemerek District. Because of the elevation of the village it can be very cold during the winter months. Bulhasan and Keklicek are the nearest villages to Orenyurt.

The kangal dog is the symbol of Sivas which originated in this region.

== History ==
The history of the village goes back to the 19th century. It was founded by the leader of the Pasa clan Kuloglu.

Some of the most known families are the Pasa's (Yildirim family), Körhasan's, Seyid's (Sahin en Özmen) Teyin's, Topalosman's, Hasanell's (Duman family) and Uzunoglan's. The Pasa's were the founders of Örenyurt. Kuloglu, Hasan Kah and Abdurrahman are one of the most known leaders of this family group.

== Coat of arms ==
The coat of arms of Örenyurt consists of a kangal supporting a shield. The kangal, Kabardic tree en the Karasivri mountain are Örenyurt symbols dating from the first beginning.

== Flag ==
The flag of Örenyurt, consists of two unequal horizontal bands of blue and orange and a Turkish flag in the same height as the blue band in the canton. The blue band bears a kangal and the Karasivri in the center. It was adopted on 2016.

== Places ==
Karasivri: the mountain near to Örenyurt.

Kabardic: an old tree in Örenyurt.

Üçoluk: a new accommodation place for the citizens.

Hayraten: old hayrats.

The Mosque of Örenyurt: a big green mosque in the center of the village.
