= Deliktaş, Kangal =

Deliktaş
- Village
- Location within Turkey Location within Turkey Central Anatolia
- Coordinates: 39°20′30″N 37°12′14″E
- Country: Turkey
- Province: Sivas
- District: Kangal
- Population (2022): 217
- Time zone: UTC+3 (TRT)
- Postal code: 58900
- Area code: 0346

Deliktaş is a village in the Kangal District of Sivas Province, Turkey. Its population is 217 (2022). It is situated between Ulaş and Kangal towns, east of the state highway D.850. The village is 19 km (12 mi) far from Kangal, and 65 km (40 mi) from the province seat Sivas.

The Deliktaş Tunnel, Turkey's longest railway tunnel with its length of 5.473 km (3.401 mi), was constructed near Deliktaş and opened in late 2012.
