= Gürçayır, Şarkışla =

Gürçayır
- Municipality
- Location in Turkey Gürçayır (Turkey Central Anatolia)
- Coordinates: 39°19′42″N 36°21′05″E
- Country: Turkey
- Province: Sivas
- District: Şarkışla
- Population (2022): 1,822
- Time zone: UTC+3 (TRT)

Gürçayır is a town (belde) in the Şarkışla District, Sivas Province, Turkey. Its population is 1,822 (2022).
