= Çepni, Gemerek =

Çepni
- Municipality
- Location within Turkey Location within Turkey Central Anatolia
- Coordinates: 39°18′34″N 36°03′05″E
- Country: Turkey
- Province: Sivas
- District: Gemerek
- Population (2022): 1,185
- Time zone: UTC+3 (TRT)

Çepni Kilisesi - Gemerek

Çepni is a town (belde) in the Gemerek District, Sivas Province, Turkey. Its population is 1,185 (2022).
