= Cemel =

- Municipality
- Location in Turkey Cemel (Turkey Central Anatolia)
- Coordinates: 39°19′N 36°28′E
- Country: Turkey
- Province: Sivas
- District: Şarkışla
- Population (2022): 1,332
- Time zone: UTC+3 (TRT)

Cemel is a town (belde) in the Şarkışla District, Sivas Province, Turkey. Its population is 1,332 (2022).
