= Ulaş District =

District of Sivas Province, Turkey

- District
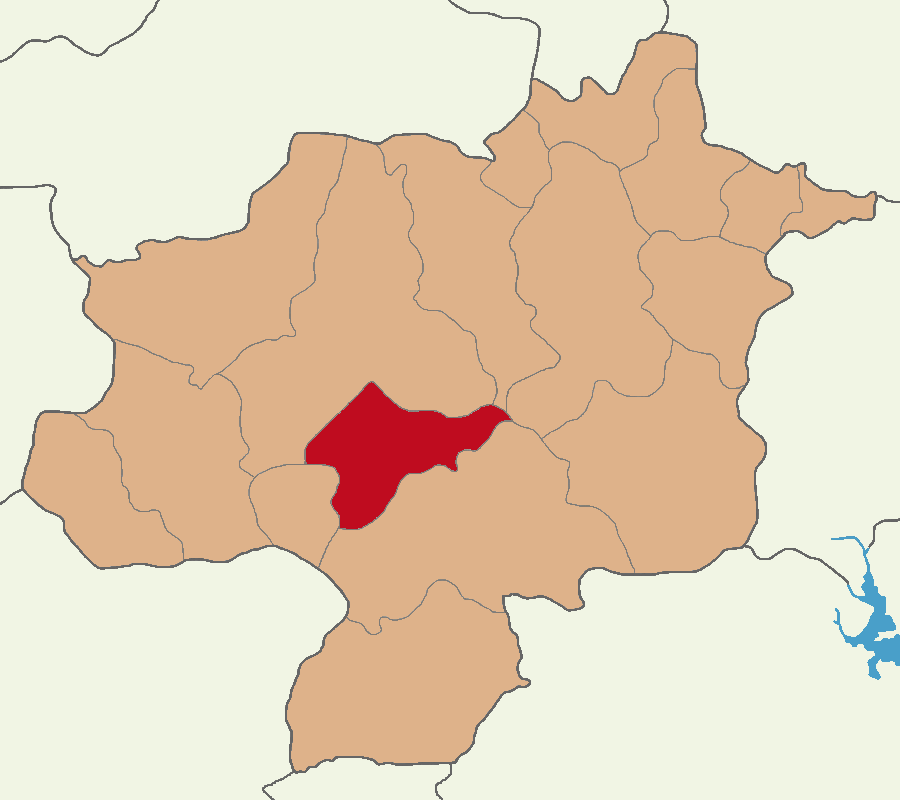
- Map showing Ulaş District in Sivas Province

- Location in Turkey Ulaş District (Turkey Central Anatolia)
- Coordinates: 39°16′N 36°45′E
- Country: Turkey
- Province: Sivas
- Seat: Ulaş

Government
  - Kaymakam: Selçuk Baş
- Area: 1,092 km^{2} (422 sq mi)
- Population (2022): 7,933
  - Density: 7.3/km^{2} (19/sq mi)
- Time zone: UTC+3 (TRT)
- Website: www.ulas.gov.tr

Ulaş District is a district of the Sivas Province of Turkey. Its seat is the town of Ulaş. Its area is 1,092 km^{2}, and its population is 7,933 (2022).

== Composition ==
There is one municipality in Ulaş District:

- Ulaş

There are 38 villages in Ulaş District:

- Acıyurt
- Akkaya
- Aşağıada
- Baharözü
- Başçayır
- Boğazdere
- Bostankaya
- Çavdar
- Çevirme
- Demircilik
- Ekincioğlu
- Eskikarahisar
- Ezentere
- Gümüşpınar
- Güneşli
- Gürpınar
- Hacımirza
- Kapukaya
- Karacalar
- Karagöl
- Karaşar
- Karataş
- Kayapınar
- Kazanpınar
- Kertmekaracaören
- Korubaşı
- Kovalı
- Küpeli
- Kurtlukaya
- Kurtoğlu
- Örenlice
- Ovacık
- Şenyurt
- Tecer
- Yağdonduran
- Yapalı
- Yazıcık
- Yukarıada
