= Deliilyas =

- Municipality
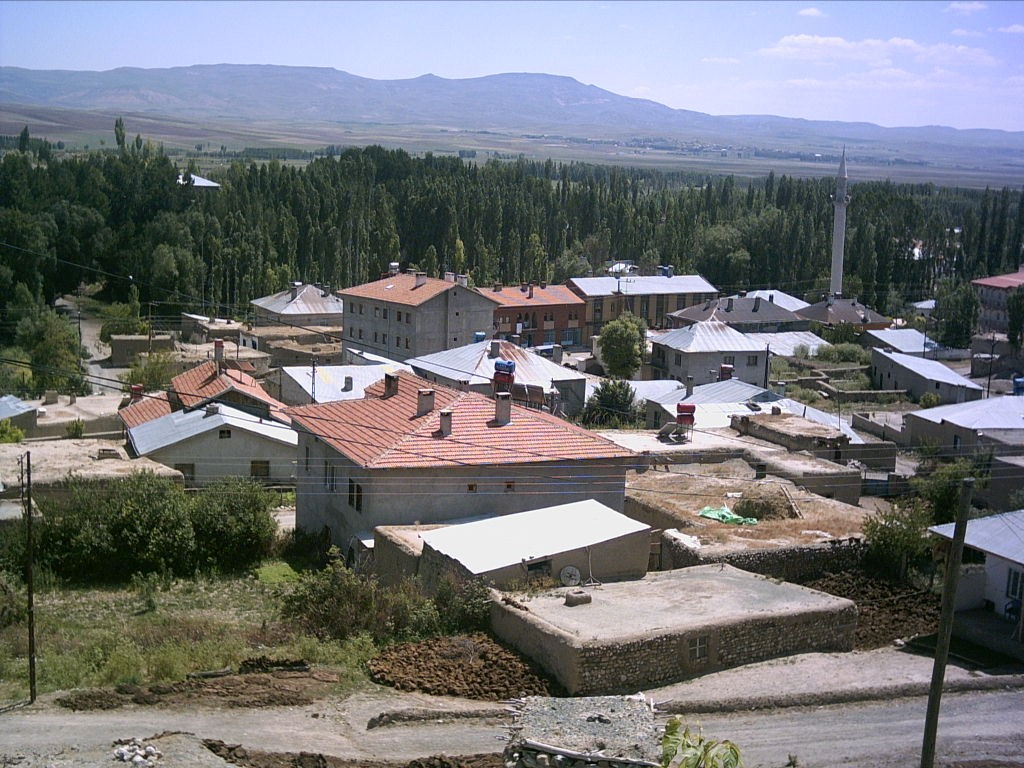
- Town in Deliilyas

- Location within Turkey Location within Turkey Central Anatolia
- Coordinates: 39°19′33″N 36°47′12″E
- Country: Turkey
- Province: Sivas
- District: Altınyayla
- Population (2022): 2,128
- Time zone: UTC+3 (TRT)

Deliilyas is a town (belde) in the Altınyayla District, Sivas Province, Turkey. Its population is 2,128 (2022).
