= Sızır =

- Municipality
- Location in Turkey Sızır (Turkey Central Anatolia)
- Coordinates: 39°18′52″N 35°57′00″E
- Country: Turkey
- Province: Sivas
- District: Gemerek
- Population (2022): 3,081
- Time zone: UTC+3 (TRT)

Sızır is a town (belde) in the Gemerek District, Sivas Province, Turkey. Its population is 3,081 (2022).
