= Gemerek District =

District of Sivas Province, Turkey

- District
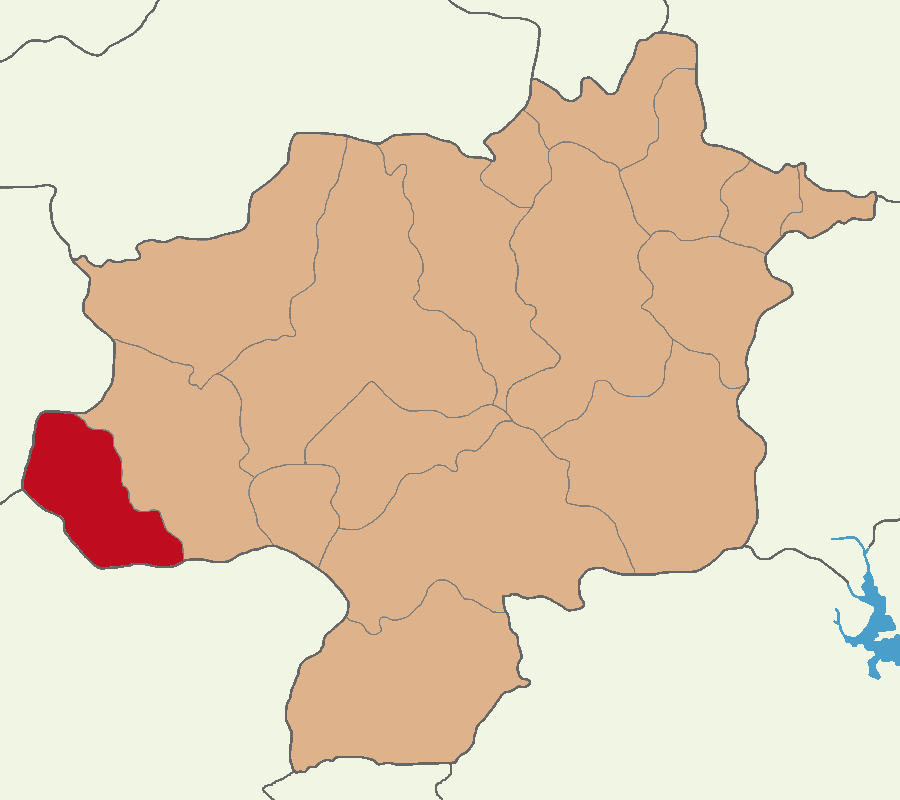
- Map showing Gemerek District in Sivas Province

- Location in Turkey Gemerek District (Turkey Central Anatolia)
- Coordinates: 39°11′N 36°04′E
- Country: Turkey
- Province: Sivas
- Seat: Gemerek

Government
  - Kaymakam: Muhammed Taha Büyükserin
- Area: 1,131 km^{2} (437 sq mi)
- Population (2022): 21,276
  - Density: 19/km^{2} (49/sq mi)
- Time zone: UTC+3 (TRT)
- Website: www.gemerek.gov.tr

Gemerek District is a district of the Sivas Province of Turkey. Its seat is the town of Gemerek. Its area is 1,131 km^{2}, and its population is 21,276 (2022).

== Composition ==
There are three municipalities in Gemerek District:

- Çepni
- Gemerek
- Sızır

There are 34 villages in Gemerek District:

- Akçaşar
- Baştepe
- Bulhasan
- Burhanköy
- Çatköy
- Cesurlar
- Çiçekoğlu
- Dendil
- Durgunsu
- Eğerci
- Ekizce
- Eşikli
- Eskiçubuk
- Eskiyurt
- Hacıyusuf
- İnkışla
- Karaağıl
- Karaerkek
- Karagöl
- Kartalkaya
- Keklicek
- Kocaoğlu
- Köseli
- Küçüktuzhisar
- Kümeören
- Örenyurt
- Osmanuşağı
- Öziçi
- Seydinali
- Talazoğlu
- Tatlıpınar
- Tekmen
- Yeniköy
- Yeşilöz
