= Döllük, Şarkışla =

Köy in Şarkışla, Turkey

Döllük
- Village
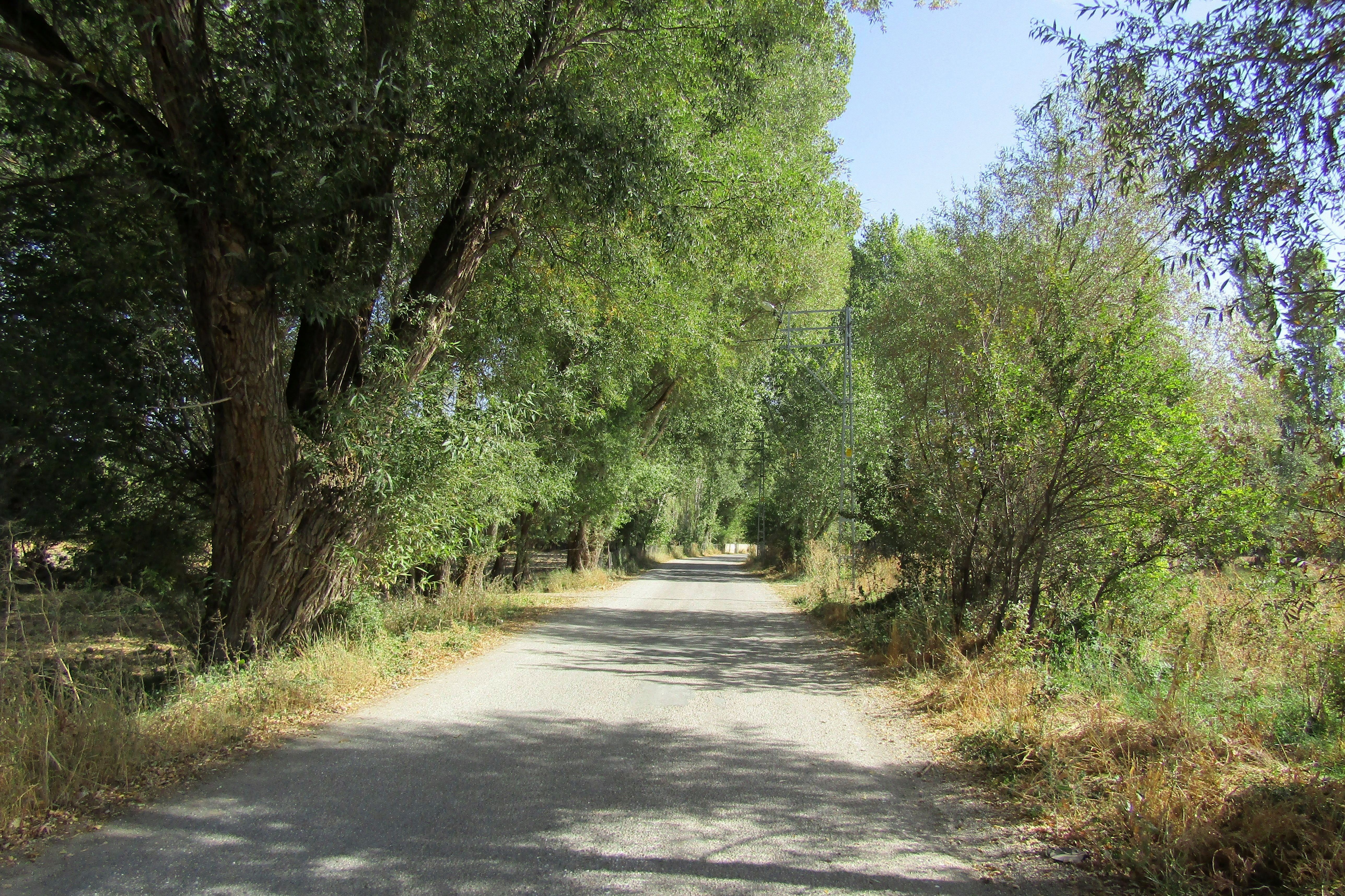
- Döllük Village - Entry Road

- Location within Turkey Location within Turkey Central Anatolia
- Coordinates: 39°20′46″N 36°27′32″E
- Country: Turkey
- Province: Sivas
- District: Şarkışla
- Population (2022): 343
- Time zone: UTC+3 (TRT)

Döllük is a village in the Şarkışla District, in Sivas Province, Turkey. Its population is 343 (2022).
