= Altınyayla District, Sivas =

District of Sivas Province, Turkey

Altınyayla District
- District
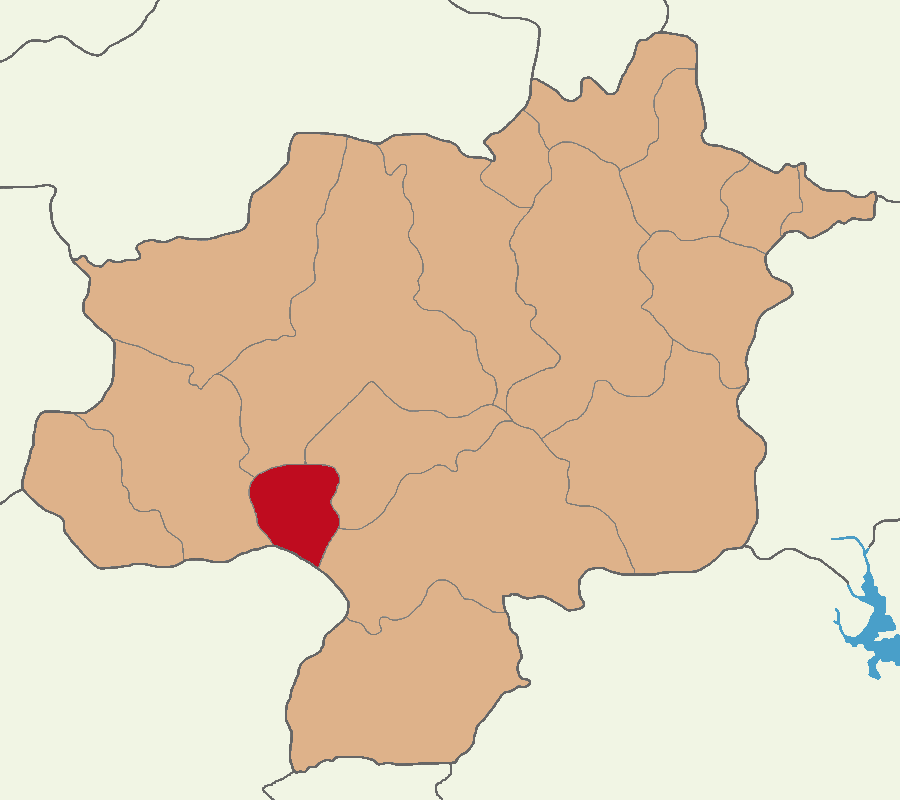
- Map showing Altınyayla District in Sivas Province

- Location in Turkey Altınyayla District (Turkey Central Anatolia)
- Coordinates: 39°16′N 36°45′E
- Country: Turkey
- Province: Sivas
- Seat: Altınyayla

Government
  - Kaymakam: Enes Burak Koca
- Area: 654 km^{2} (253 sq mi)
- Population (2022): 8,738
  - Density: 13/km^{2} (35/sq mi)
- Time zone: UTC+3 (TRT)
- Website: www.altinyayla.gov.tr

Altınyayla District is a district of the Sivas Province of Turkey. Its seat is the town of Altınyayla. Its area is 654 km^{2}, and its population is 8,738 (2022).

== Composition ==
There are two municipalities in Altınyayla District:

- Altınyayla
- Deliilyas

There are 10 villages in Altınyayla District:

- Başyayla
- Bayındır
- Doğupınar
- Gümüşdiğin
- Harmandalı
- Kızılhüyük
- Mutubey
- Paşaköy
- Tahtyurt
- Taşlıhüyük
