= Gemerek =

- Municipality
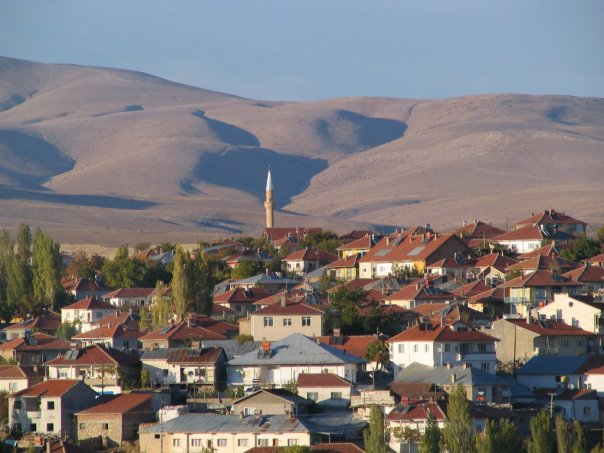

- Location within Turkey Location within Turkey Central Anatolia
- Coordinates: 39°10′55″N 36°04′05″E
- Country: Turkey
- Province: Sivas
- District: Gemerek

Government
  - Mayor: Sezai Çelikten (Independent)
- Elevation: 1,204 m (3,950 ft)
- Population (2022): 10,195
- Time zone: UTC+3 (TRT)
- Area code: 0346
- Website: www.gemerek.bel.tr

Gemerek is a town in Sivas Province of Turkey. It is the seat of Gemerek District. Its population is 10,195 (2022). The mayor is Sezai Çelikten (Independent).

== Climate ==
Gemerek has a dry-summer continental climate (Köppen: Dsb/Dsa), with hot, dry summers, nevertheless with cool nights, and cold, snowy winters.

Climate data for Gemerek (1991–2020)
Month	Jan	Feb	Mar	Apr	May	Jun	Jul	Aug	Sep	Oct	Nov	Dec	Year
Mean daily maximum °C (°F)	2.8 (37.0)	5.1 (41.2)	11.1 (52.0)	17.1 (62.8)	21.8 (71.2)	26.6 (79.9)	30.7 (87.3)	31.2 (88.2)	26.9 (80.4)	20.6 (69.1)	12.5 (54.5)	5.4 (41.7)	17.7 (63.9)
Daily mean °C (°F)	−2.6 (27.3)	−1.2 (29.8)	4.4 (39.9)	9.8 (49.6)	14.0 (57.2)	18.2 (64.8)	21.6 (70.9)	21.8 (71.2)	17.2 (63.0)	11.5 (52.7)	4.5 (40.1)	−0.2 (31.6)	10.0 (50.0)
Mean daily minimum °C (°F)	−7.2 (19.0)	−6.5 (20.3)	−1.4 (29.5)	2.8 (37.0)	6.5 (43.7)	9.8 (49.6)	12.1 (53.8)	12.1 (53.8)	7.7 (45.9)	3.7 (38.7)	−1.6 (29.1)	−4.6 (23.7)	2.8 (37.0)
Average precipitation mm (inches)	43.6 (1.72)	34.48 (1.36)	44.92 (1.77)	44.36 (1.75)	57.84 (2.28)	34.53 (1.36)	6.74 (0.27)	7.53 (0.30)	13.19 (0.52)	32.41 (1.28)	36.65 (1.44)	42.2 (1.66)	398.45 (15.69)
Average precipitation days (≥ 1.0 mm)	7.2	6.5	7.9	8.3	9.0	5.4	2.1	1.5	2.8	5.7	5.7	6.4	68.5
Average relative humidity (%)	77.3	73.9	67.0	60.7	62.2	58.8	53.0	52.5	54.1	63.6	70.0	77.0	64.2
Mean monthly sunshine hours	97.6	115.8	160.8	198.9	246.2	291.1	323.3	319.4	269.1	201.6	144.6	83.0	2,402.9
Source: NOAA
