= Altınyayla, Sivas =

Altınyayla
- Municipality
- Location in Turkey Altınyayla (Turkey Central Anatolia)
- Coordinates: 39°16′21″N 36°45′04″E
- Country: Turkey
- Province: Sivas
- District: Altınyayla

Government
  - Mayor: Sinan Akbulut (AKP)
- Population (2022): 4,307
- Time zone: UTC+3 (TRT)
- Postal code: 58470
- Area code: 0346
- Website: www.altinyayla.bel.tr

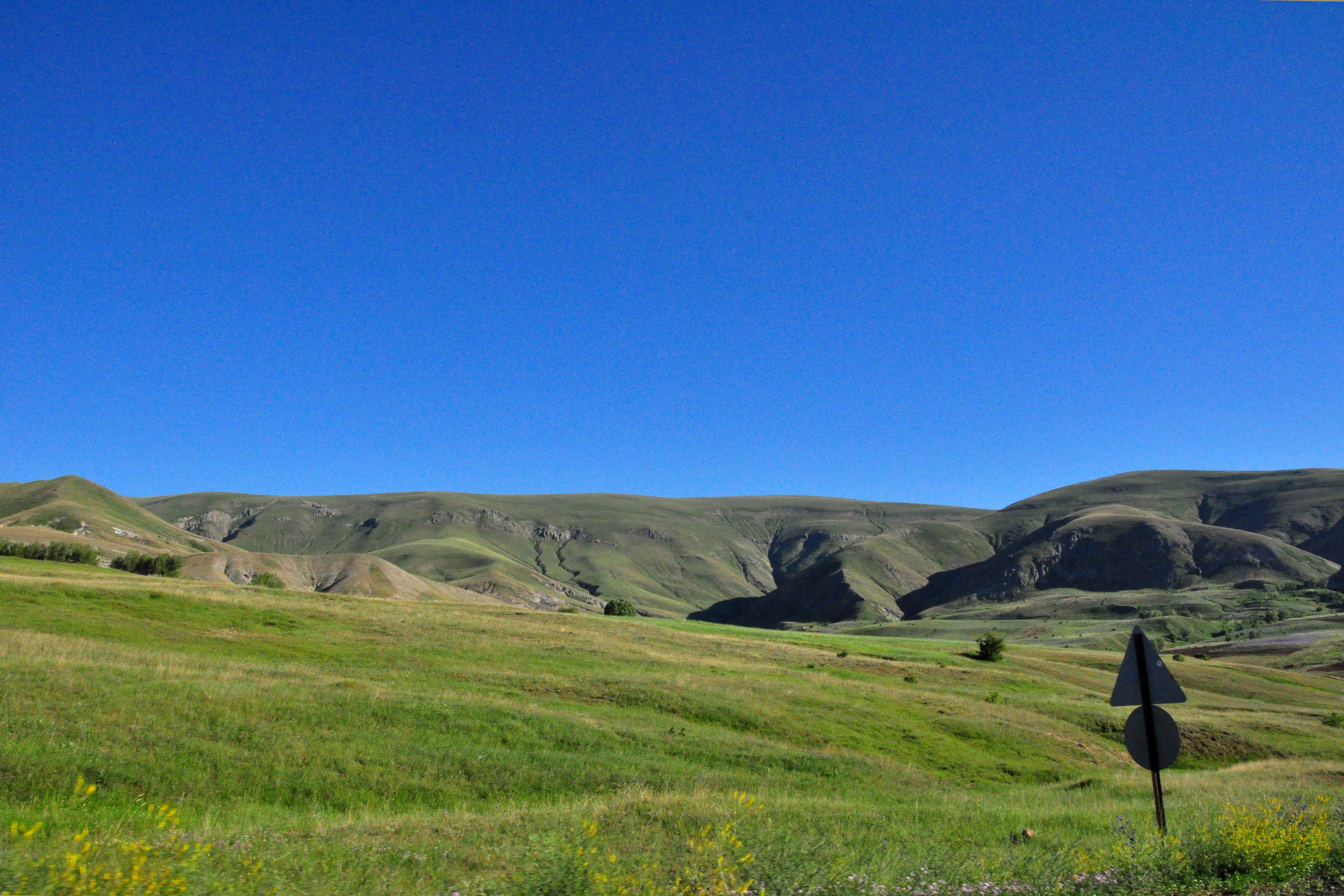
Altınyayla, Sivas Province, Turkey.

Altınyayla (Kurdish: Tonus) is a town in Sivas Province of Turkey. It is the seat of Altınyayla District. Its population is 4,307 (2022). The mayor is Sinan Akbulut (AKP).
