= Şarkışla =

- Municipality
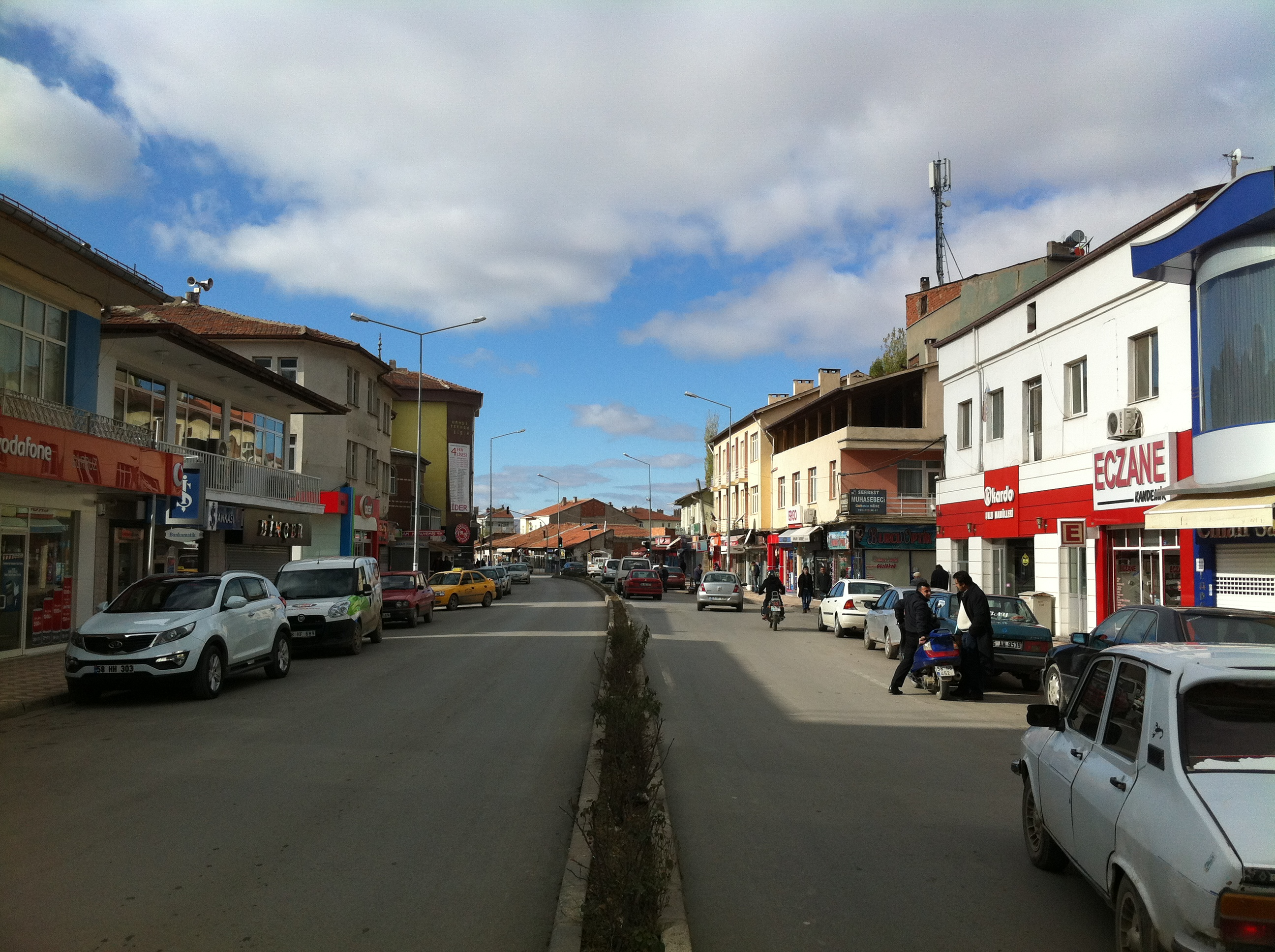

- Coat of arms

- Location within Turkey Location within Turkey Central Anatolia
- Coordinates: 39°21′N 36°24′E
- Country: Turkey
- Province: Sivas
- District: Şarkışla

Government
  - Mayor: Kasim Gültekin (BBP)
- Population (2022): 23,707
- Time zone: UTC+3 (TRT)
- Postal code: 58400
- Area code: 0346
- Website: sarkisla.bel.tr

Şarkışla is a town in the Central Anatolian Sivas Province of Turkey. It is the seat of Şarkışla District. Its population is 23,707 (2022). The mayor is Kasim Gültekin (BBP).

Aşık Veysel, one of the most famous Turkish folk poets and folk music singers of the 20th century, was born in Şarkışla, as well as another earlier poet (19th century) named Aşık Sefil Kanberi. The Turkish originated female Dutch politician Nebahat Albayrak was born (1968) in Maksutlu village of this town as well.

Şarkışla has all the characteristics of the Central Anatolian climate in all seasons. The weather is mostly sunny and dry, and the clouds are high. In the summer months, Şarkışla is known to host great heat levels, especially considering the humidity levels that also rise to 95 percent. The winters also tend to be cold, reaching below freezing temperatures in December and January.

There are plenty of dams constructed in and around the town, which are used for agricultural and recreational needs. A recently constructed Baku–Tbilisi–Ceyhan pipeline is crossing by Şarkışla.

The known history of Şarkışla goes as far back as 4th century BC. Şarkışla is known to be populated since the ancient time of the Romans. A historical high castle still exists in the middle of the town.

During the last decades, many residents emigrated from this region to bigger Turkish cities such as Istanbul and Ankara and some have settled abroad. These emigrating tendencies have hurt the districts population greatly and the remaining population is mostly elderly.

As well as the other parts of Sivas, Şarkışla holds strong anatolian cultural motives and ideas. Şarkışla also has a large inventory of Turkish cuisine and a variety of regional foods borrowed from the Circassians and Armenians.

== See also ==
- Aşık Veysel
- Aşık Veysel Meslek Yüksekokulu
