= Ulaş =

- Municipality
- Location in Turkey Ulaş (Turkey Central Anatolia)
- Coordinates: 39°16′21″N 36°45′04″E
- Country: Turkey
- Province: Sivas
- District: Ulaş

Government
  - Mayor: Turan İlbey (MHP)
- Elevation: 1,382 m (4,534 ft)
- Population (2022): 2,991
- Time zone: UTC+3 (TRT)
- Area code: 0346
- Website: www.ulas.bel.tr

Ulaş (Kurdish: Tecer) is a town in Sivas Province of Central Anatolia, Turkey. It is the seat of Ulaş District. Its population is 2,991 (2022). The mayor is Turan İlbey (MHP).
