= The Lizard With the Seven Skins =

Spanish folk tale

El lagarto de las siete camisas (English: "The Lizard with the Seven Skins") is a Spanish folktale from Cuenca, first published by folklorist Aurélio M. Espinosa.

The tale is related to the international cycle of the Animal as Bridegroom. The first part of the tale shares similarities with King Lindworm, in that the animal husband kills his brides, but preserves the third one, who disenchants him; the second part is connected to The Search for the Lost Husband: a human maiden marries an animal that is a prince in disguise, breaks a taboo and loses him, and she has to seek him out.

== Sources ==
Folklorist Aurélio M. Espinosa published the tale from a source in Cuenca. The tale was also republished as La joven María y el príncipe lagarto ("Young María and the Lizard Prince").

== Summary ==
In this tale, a queen longs for a child, even if it is a lizard. God grants her wish and she gives birth to a lizard. Whenever a wet nurse tries to feed the child, the lizard bites off the wet nurse's breast, so they have to find another wet nurse, but he keeps biting them.

The royal couple find a girl named Mariquita, who lives with her father and sisters, and is hired to suckle the prince with a pair of iron breasts filled with milk. The lizard prince grows up and wants to marry. Mariquita's sisters are given to him: he expects his wife to stay awake and wait for him on their bed; Mariquita's sisters fail due to falling asleep and the prince kills them. However, Mariquita stays awake and sees that the lizard is a prince underneath the animal skin after he removes them. He puts the seven lizard skins on a couch and warns his wife not to touch them.

Mariquita tells the queen about her son's secret and they decide to burn the lizard skins: the queen asks Mariquita to let the door to their bedroom open, so she can see for herself her son's true form. That same night, Mariquita allows the queen to see her husband's handsome human form, steals the seven skins and burns them. The following morning, the prince notices that his seven skins are gone, admonishes Mariquita and says she will have to find him at the Castillo de Irás y No Volverás, by wearing seven pairs of iron shoes, she and their unborn son, if she wants to find him again, then vanishes. Mariquita gives birth to a young boy and waits for his turning a young age so both can wear the pairs of iron shoes in pursuit of the lizard prince.

The mother-son duo begin their long journey, and, after wearing down six of the seven pairs, reach the house of an old lady, who gives them three nuts, for Mariquita to open in the hour of direst need. Finally, they reach a castle which belongs to the mother of the eagles, who welcomes them and summons the royal eagle, who may have information about the Castillo. The royal eagle appears and says it has just come from there, where a wedding was celebrated, and agrees to take Mariquita and her son across the skies to the Castillo.

After the aerial journey, Mariquita stops by the doors of the Castillo and cracks open the first nut, releasing a golden loom. The local princess's maidservant spots the golden object in the stranger's hands and informs the princess, who wishes to have it. Mariquita agrees to a deal: the golden loom for a night in the prince's room. The princess agrees, but has her maidservant give the now human lizard prince a sleeping drink. Mariquita cannot wake her husband up on the first night, and she and her son are thrown out of the room by morning.

Undeterred, Mariquita breaks open the second nut and releases a golden spindle, which she uses to trade for a second night in the prince's chambers. Once again, she fails to nudge him awake, since the princess and the maidservant give him a sleeping drink. After the first two nights, a servant informs the lizard prince of the princess's stratagem, and decides to avoid drinking anything the princess offers him. Back to Mariquita, she opens the last nut and finds a little golden egg, which she trades with the princess. The princess is worried about letting a stranger into her husband's room, when she was the one to have married him. Still, the princess takes the third object and tries to give a drink to the lizard prince, but he spills it and feigns sleep. Mariquita enters her husband's room for the third time and cries over his sleeping body. He listens to her story, wakes up and embraces her.

The following morning, the prince assembles the court and asks them that he had a key he lost, had a new one made, but found the first one, so he asks which key he should keep. The court reply that he should keep the first one, so the prince decides to leave with Mariquita and their son. The local princess's father tells the prince that, since his daughter and the prince have not spend the night together, she is free to marry another.

== Analysis ==
=== Tale type ===
The tale is classified, according to the international Aarne-Thompson-Uther Index, as a combination of types: AaTh 433B, "El príncipe serpiente mata a las novias ariscas", and AaTh 425A, "El monstruo como esposo".

The first part of the tale is classified in the international Aarne-Thompson-Uther Index as type ATU 433B, "King Lindworm": a serpent (snake, or dragon) son is born to a king and queen (either from a birthing implement or due to a wish); years later, the serpent prince wishes to marry, but he kills every bride they bring him; a girl is brought to him as a prospective bride, and wears several layers of cloth to parallel the serpent's skins; she disenchants him. Tale type ATU 433B, "King Lindworm", is part of the cycle of the Animal as Bridegroom, stories that involve a human maiden marrying a prince in animal form and disenchanting him.

The second part of the tale is indexed as type ATU 425A, "The Animal (Monster) as Bridegroom". In this tale type, the heroine is a human maiden who marries a prince who is cursed to become an animal of some sort. She betrays his trust and he disappears, prompting a quest for him.

=== Motifs ===
==== The heroine's journey ====
According to Hans-Jörg Uther, the main feature of tale type ATU 425A is "bribing the false bride for three nights with the husband". In fact, when he developed his revision of Aarne-Thompson's system, Uther remarked that an "essential" trait of the tale type ATU 425A was the "wife's quest and gifts" and "nights bought". It is "frequent" in Spanish variants that the heroine, in her quest, reaches the house of the Sol ('Sun'), Luna ('Moon') and Aire ('Air' or 'Wind').

==== The animal husband ====
According to scholarship, the form of the animal husband may vary between Spanish and Hispano-American tradition, but the lizard as his enchanted form is "common" to both continents.

== Variants ==
=== Spain ===
==== The Tailor's Daughters ====
In a tale collected from a Leonese source with the title Las hijas del sastre ("The Tailor's Daughters"), a gypsy woman knocks on every door for alms. One day, she knocks on a king's doors and begs for some, but the king denies her request. Thus, the gypsy woman curses the pregnant king's wife so that her unborn child becomes a lizard. In time, a lizard is indeed born to the queen, but acts like a human being: eats at the table and walks with then. However, the lizard is indeed human underneath the lizard skin, for he removes it whenever he goes to sleep, without his mother knowing. Some time later, the lizard son asks his mother to find him a bride, and he chooses the tailor's youngest daughter. The queen asks the tailor for the hand of his youngest daughter on the prince's behalf, and he delivers his youngest to the royal couple. On the weddign night, the tailor's daughter pushes the lizard suitor away whenever he tries to climb on the marital bed, and, for this affront, his strangles her. Next, the prince asks for the hand of the tailor's middle daughter, whom the queen brings as his second bride. Just as the first one, the lizard prince kills the second bride. Lastly, the queen brings the tailor's elder daughter, who marries the lizard prince and goes to sleep on the same bed as the reptile. The prince takes off the animal skin and embraces his human wife. The queen notices the girl is strangely happy and suspects something, but her daughter-in-law reveals the prince is a handsome youth underneath the lizard skin, so the queen plots with her to burn his animal disguise. In another night, while the prince and his wife are asleep, the queen steals the lizard skin and burns it with the king's help in a large fire. The next morning, the prince cannot find the reptile skin, and says his wife will have to search for him at the Castillos de Irás y No Volverás, by wearing down iron shoes. The girl buys the iron shoes and begins a journey towards the Castillos. She passes by the houses of the Moon and his mother, the Sun and his mother and the Averroz and his mother. The Averroz knows the location of the Castillos, and gives the girl a woolen "manelita", a spool of thread and a tuft of cotton, then takes her to the Castillos. Once there, she passes herself off as a poor girl and takes out the gifts from Averroz: the first produces a golden hen with chicks, which she trades with the local bride who is celebrating her marriage to the human lizard prince. The girl cannot wake him up on the first night, so she trades a skein of silk for a second night. During her encounter with the sleeping lizard prince, her lament is overheard by a servant, who later informs his master about the stranger. The third night, the girl trades her last valuable thing for one last night with him, and the human lizard prince recognizes her, after not drinking a sleeping potion. The prince then arranges a new wedding, and invites the poor girl (his true wife) to eat with them. The prince then asks his guests about a lost key he previously had for a chest, bought others, but found the first one, so which one should he keep? The guests say he should keep the first one; thus, the prince chooses to be with his first wife, and they settle in the Castillos de Irás y No Volverás for a time, before they return to his parents' kingdom.

==== The Lizard King (Leon) ====
In a tale collected from a Leonese source and published by scholar Julio Camarena with the title El Rey Lagarto ("The Lizard King"), a king and queen are childless, so they pray for the Virgin Mary and to God for a son, even if he is a lizard. Thus, a lizard is born to them, with head of a blue colour and the rest of a green shade. Years later, the lizard son asks his mother to find him a bride, lest he kills the queen. The queen finds a house with three single ladies, and brings the first one as Rey Lagarto's bride. On the wedding night, the lizard prince creeps on the girl's body, she shrieks and tosses him away, and he kills her for it. Later, the lizard prince asks his mother for another bride, and his second bride also rejects him on the wedding night after letting out a shriek of horror, and the lizard prince kills her for it. Lastly, the queen brings the youngest sister as the lizard prince's bride. On the wedding night, the girl does not reject him; he accepts her and tells her he is cursed into that form, and he must travel to the Castillos de África to reverse the curse, then disappears. The girl decides to go after him and buys a pair of shoes, beginning a journey towards the Castillos de África. After a long journey, the girl reaches the house of the Moon and his mother, who do not know where is such a place. Still, the mother of the Moon gives the girl some little golden apples, and she continues on her journey. Next, the girl reaches the house of the Sun and his mother, who also do not know of the location of the Castillos. Still, the Sun's mother gives her some golden pears, and she continues her travels. At last, the girl reaches the house of the Aire and his mother, who do know the location of the Castillos: in a valley, in a thick forest. The Aire's mother gives the girl a golden spinning wheel and golden fuse, and she is carried by the Aire to the wooded valley, where she lands. The girl then knocks on a nearby hut to check her destination, and its female occupant confirms it is the Castillos de África. The lizard prince's wife takes out the golden objects and draws the attention of the female owner of the house, who wishes to buy the golden items. The girl trades them for a night with Rey Lagarto: the golden spinning wheel and fuse on the first night, the golden apples on the second, and the golden pears on the third. For the first two nights, the girl sings some verses to wake Rey Lagarto up, but he does not budge, since he drank a sleeping potion given by the owner of the house. On the third night, Rey Lagarto pretends to be asleep, and listens to his wife's lament, then wakes up, takes his wife, and goes back to his homeland where his parents live.

==== El Castillo de Irás Y No Volverás ====
In an Andalusian tale collected from an informant named Leocadia Caballero Robles in Arahal with the title El Castillo de Irás Y No Volverás ("The Castle of Going and Not Returning"), a childless woman prays in church for a son, even if he is a little pig, and the priest sends her back home, since her prayers have been granted. The woman talks to her pig son, who wishes to marry and chooses the eldest daughter of their female neighbour. Despite his mother's objections, the pig goes through with the marriage. At night, the teller explains, the pig takes off the skin to become human, but kills the first wife in the morning. Days later, he wishes to take the middle daughter as second bride. He marries the second daughter and kills her. Finally, the pig son marries the youngest daughter, who survives the night with him. The pig son reveals his true human form to the girl and bids her not to tell anyone, lest she has to search for him at the Castle of Going and Not Returning. Despite the warning, the girl tells her mother-in-law the pig is no animal, but a prince. The human pig learns his wife betrayed his trust, tells her to search for him in three pairs of iron shoes, and vanishes. She begins a journey to the Castle, and passes by the house of the Wind and his mother, where she gains a ball of yarn that can produce chickens, and the house of the "aire o el viento" (per the teller's text) and their mother, where she gains some casts. She rides the strong winds and reaches the house of the Hurricane and his mother. The Hurricane takes the girl to the Castle and leaves her there. As soon as she lands, the girl takes out the ball of yarn and plays with its chicks. This draws out the attention of the local woman, who wishes to have the chicks, but the girl trades them for a night in the prince's quarters. She cannot wake the prince, her husband, for he was given a sleeping drink. The woman enters the prince's room and expels the girl. The girl trades three nights with the prince, and wakes him up on the third one. The prince recognizes his true wife and kills the second woman.

==== The Lizard Prince (Galicia) ====
In a Galician tale collected from Vila de Calvos de Randín by author Xaquín Lorenzo with the Galician title O Príncipe Lagarto ("The Lizard Prince"), a king and a queen are childless. One day, the queen goes to the palace balcony, sees a lizard and makes a wish to have a son, even it he looks like this lizard. Thus, a lizard is born to her. When he is older, he asks his mother he wants to be married, but the queen questions how anyone would marry one such as him. Still, the lizard prince insists, and the queen finds a poor family of three sisters who agree to marry him, and whoever resists his "kisses" ("beixos") would be his bride. The elder sister is brought to the prince, but she faints when the lizard nears her breast. The same happens to the second sister. Finally, the third sister declares she will resist. The third sister bears his approach and marries him. The day following the wedding, the queen asks her daughter-in-law about the lizard prince, and the girl reveals the prince is actually a handsome youth under the lizard skin ("pelica do lagarto"). The queen conspires with the girl to destroy the snake skin and to have him in human form at all times: she is to steal the lizard skin when he is asleep and burn it. The following morning, the prince, in human form, asks his wife where she put his skins, but his wife feigns ignorance. The prince issues an ultimatum: either she produces the skins, or he will depart. Thus, he departs and wanders the world, until he reaches another kingdom and falls in love with its princess. Back to the lizard prince's wife, she goes after him and begins a long journey. Eventually, she finds an old woman who tells her the prince is to be married to another princess, gives her an apple, a pear and an orange; the girl is to wait by the steps of the castle, cut open the apple to release a spinning wheel and a spindle, both of gold and gemstones, which she is to trade with the princess for a night in the prince's quarters. The girl continues her journey until she reaches the princess's castle doors, cuts open the apple and produces the extravagant spinning wheel and spindle, which she trades with the local princess. The princess gives the prince a sleeping water to make him fall asleep, and his first wife cannot wake him up. For the second night, the girl opens up the pear and takes out a reel ("sarillo") of gold and gemstones which she trades for a second night in the prince's quarters, but she cannot wake him up again. The following morning, the guard of the palace informs the prince about the mysterious girl that comes at night to cry over his body who claims she is his wife, and the prince realizes she is his wife. For the last night, the girl opens up the orange and produces a spool ("devandoira") of gold and gemstones which she trades with the princess. The prince avoids drinking the water and feigns sleep, so he waits for his true wife in his chamber. The girl appears and cries over him the entire night. He wakes up by dawn and goes to talk to the local king about having a key for a chest, lost it and had another made, but found the first one. The king replies that the prince should keep the first one, and the lizard prince explains he found his first wife and will go back with her, leaving the princess in her kingdom. The king tries to recant his reply, but lets the lizard prince depart with his first wife. Professor Camiño Noia Campos's Index of Galician Folktales, published in 2021, classifies the tale as type ATU 425A, "The Animal as Bridegroom". Galician anthropologist Xosé Ramón Mariño Ferro recognized that the Galician O príncipe lagarto was classified as type ATU 425A, with elements of 433B.

=== Panama ===
In a Panamenian tale titled El Rey Pajarino Amor, first collected by author Mario Riera Pinilla and republished by folklorist Dona Pérez de Zárate as El Rey Pájaro Amor, in a city a serpent takes a girl every day. Eventually, the lot falls to an orphan girl, who readies herself to the sacrifice, so she prays for her mother's soul to guard her. As she is going to meet the serpent, she hears a voice telling her that the serpent is an enchanted prince, so she should put on seven undershirts. The girls does as instructed and meets the serpent, who coils around the girl's legs. As the girl takes off the first undershirt, the snake sheds a skin. This continues until the girl removes all seven undershirts and the serpent sheds seven skins, revealing his human countenance within. The prince asks the girl not to reveal the secret, lest he vanishes. The next day, the girl is questioned about the event, but she tells nothing, save to the prince's mother, the queen. In secret, the queen fetches the seven snakeskins and burns them. The prince admonishes the girl and tells her to seek him out with three pairs of iron shoes, then vanishes. The girl cries for her misdeed, buys the iron shoes and departs on a long journey in search of Rey Pájaro Amor (the prince's name). She passes by the house of the Wind and his mother, where she gains a golden totuma, then to the house of the Sun and his mother, where she is gifted a little golden comb. Both the Wind and the Sun do not know. Lastly, she reaches the house of the lord of the birds, who summons his subjects with a whistle to confer with them: the cacicón says it has flown from the prince's wedding. The lord of the birds gives the girl a pair of golden shoes and bids the cacicón carries her there. When they land, the girl takes out the golden comb, which draws the attention of a servant of the queen that married Rey Pajarino Amor. The girl trades the comb for a night in his chambers, but the queen gives him a soporific drink. The next day, she uses the golden totuma to bribe the queen, again failing to wake him up, and on the third day the golden shoes. On the third day, Rey Pajarino Amor avoids drinking the potion and pretends to be asleep, when the girl enters his chambers and begs him to wake up. He wakes up and they embrace. The queen finds them together and dies of anger. Rey Pajarino Amor marries the girl who disenchanted him.

== See also ==
- The Sprig of Rosemary
- The Dragon-Prince and the Stepmother (ATU 433B)
- The Stepdaughter and the Black Serpent
- The Girl With Two Husbands (ATU 433B)
- Dragon-Child and Sun-Child (Armenian folktale)
