= King Lindworm =

Danish fairy tale published in the 19th century by Danish folklorist Svend Grundtvig

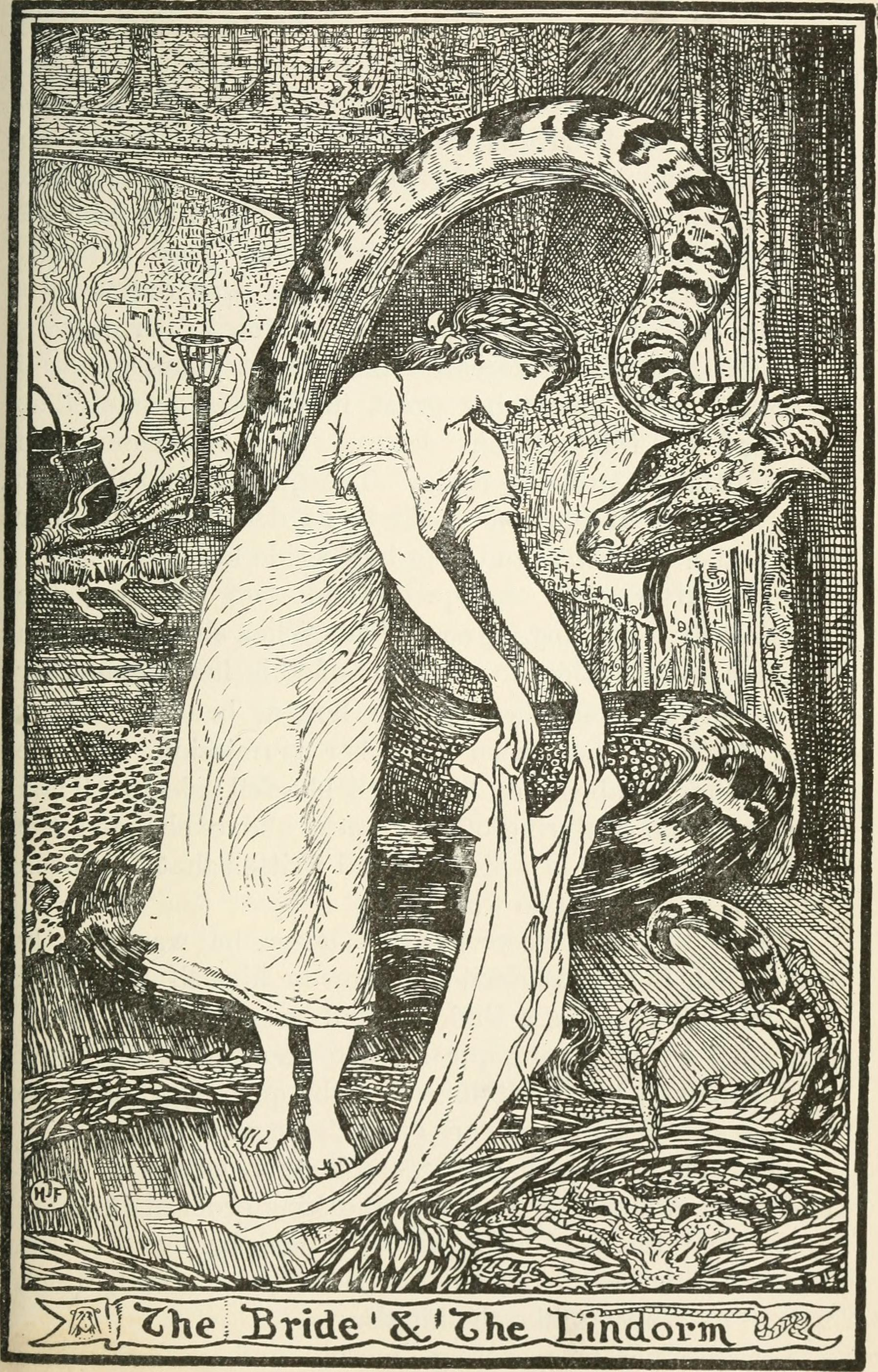
- The maiden amidst the Lindorm's shed skins. Illustration by Henry Justice Ford for Andrew Lang's The Pink Fairy Book (1897).

Folk tale
- Name: King Lindworm
- Also known as: Prince Lindworm
- Aarne–Thompson grouping: ATU 433B (Prince Lindworm)
- Region: Denmark
- Published in: Gamle danske minder i folkemunde, by Svend Grundtvig (1854)
- Related: The Bewitched Prince; The Dragon-Prince and the Stepmother; The Stepdaughter and the Black Serpent; The Girl with Two Husbands; Dragon-Child and Sun-Child; Mimikakliu; The Fisherman's Daughter; The Serpent Prince, or the Woman with Two Husbands

King Lindworm or Prince Lindworm (Danish: Kong Lindorm) is a Danish fairy tale published in the 19th century by Danish folklorist Svend Grundtvig. The tale is part of the more general cycle of the Animal as Bridegroom, and is classified in the Aarne–Thompson–Uther Index as tale type ATU 433B, a type that deals with maidens disenchanting serpentine husbands. (Note: German folklorist Hans-Jörg Uther, in his own revision of the folktale index, in 2004, subsumed previous types AaTh 433, AaTh 433A and AaTh 433C under only one type, ATU 433B.)

== Summary ==
In this tale from Scandinavian folklore, a "half-man, half-snake" lindworm is born, as one of twins, to a queen, who, in an effort to overcome her childless situation, has followed the advice of an old crone, who tells her to eat one of two roses, one red, one white, but not both. She forgot and ate both, causing the first twin to be a lindworm. The second twin is a beautiful baby boy. When he grows up and sets off to find a bride, the lindworm insists that a bride be found for him before his younger brother can marry.

The Lind worm eats the first two princesses given to him, until a shepherd's daughter who spoke to the same crone is brought to marry him, wearing every dress she owns. The lindworm tells her to take off her dress, but she insists he shed a skin for each dress she removes. Eventually his human form is revealed beneath the last skin. Some versions of the story omit the lindworm's twin, and the gender of the soothsayer varies.

== Translations ==
The tale was published in a compilation of tales "from the North" with illustrations by artist Kay Nielsen, with the title Prince Lindworm.

== Analysis ==
=== Tale type ===
The tale of Prince Lindworm is part of a multiverse of tales in which a maiden is betrothed or wooed by a prince enchanted to be a snake or other serpentine creature (ATU 433B, "The Prince as Serpent"; "King Lindworm").

In the first iteration of the international folktale classification, by folklorist Antti Aarne, he established that this tale type concerned about a childless queen who gives birth to a boy in snake form. The boy is only disenchanted by a maiden after they both undress and enter a bath.

The tale type can also be called King Wyvern, as per the studies of scholar Bengt Holbek.

=== Motifs ===
==== The lindworm's disenchantment ====
According to Svend Grundtvig's system of folktale classification, translated by Astrid Lunding in 1910, this type (King-Snake or Kong Lindorm) may also show the maiden whipping the prince in the bridal bed in order to disenchant him.

Scholar Jan-Öjvind Swahn, in his work about Cupid and Psyche and other Animal as Bridegroom tales, described that the King Lindworm tales are "usually characterized" by the motifs of "release by bathing" and "7 shifts and 7 skins". Similarly, according to Birgit Olsen, "in most versions" the heroine is advised by her mother's spirit to wear many shifts for her wedding night with the lindworm prince.

==== The heroine's dilemma ====
Swedish scholar Waldemar Liungman noted that the heroine, in the second part of the tale, is torn between a first and second husbands, and chooses the first - a dilemma that occurs "both in the Nordic as well as in variants from Eastern and Southeastern Europe". As for the nature of the second husband, he is a man cursed to be dead in the latter, while in the former region he is a prince in bird form or a man who has a contract with the Devil. In addition, researcher Birgit Olsen indicated that the combination with the second part of the story forms an East Mediterranean oikotype, popular in both Greece and Asia Minor.

==== Other motifs ====
Danish folklorist Axel Olrik, in his study, noted that the flower as a birthing implement appears in Asian tales (from India, China and Annam), and suggested that it may have been the origin of the motif in the Scandinavian tale.

== Variants ==
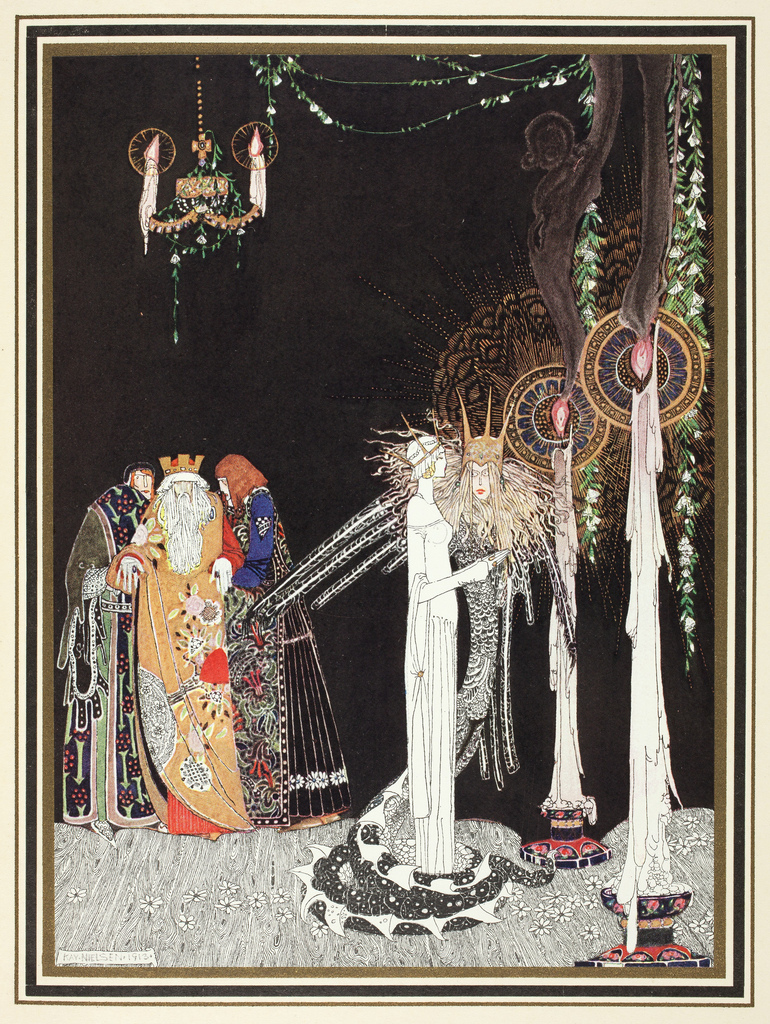
The Lindworm Prince coils around his bride-to-be. Illustration by Kay Nielsen for East of the Sun and West of the Moon: Old Tales from the North (1914).

=== Origins ===
According to scholar Christine Goldberg, an analysis of the tale type through the historic-geographic method by Anna Birgitta Waldmarson suggests that it has originated as simple legends in India and combined into a two-part tale in the Near East, migrating to Scandinavia in the 17th century. Folklorist Stith Thompson was also of the opinion that the continuation of the narrative with the adventures of the bride/wife, may have originally formed in the Near East.

Danish folklorist Axel Olrik also suggested that the origin of the story lay elsewhere than Scandinavia, since, etymologically speaking, the word lindworm appears in Germanic languages of medieval times, and may not hark back to an earlier period in Nordic history.

=== Distribution ===
A geographical analysis of variants by Stith Thompson led him to believe its origin lay in the East, since variants are found in India, in the Near East and in Scandinavia (in Denmark and in southern Sweden). In his study on the Danish story, Axel Olrik noted its "evenly distribution" over the North Sea, across the coast of Scania and into the Baltic Sea, with similar stories attested in South Germany and Southern Europe (frequent in Italy, but sparse in Albania and Portugal). In the same vein, according to Carl Wilhelm von Sydow, variants of "King Lindrom" are "disseminated" in Italy, the Balkans, in Turkey and in Persia, but also appear in Denmark and in Scania (or, in his words, "in the old Danish sphere"). Furthermore, Anna Birgitta Rooth indicated that the story developed two local forms, or oikotypes: one Danish-Skanisch and the other Mediterranean - in which Walter Scherf includes variants from Armenia, Turkey and Greece, as well from Italy, Portugal and France.

=== Europe ===
==== Scandinavia ====
According to Bengt Holbek, variants of type 433B that continue with the adventures of the serpent husband's wife are reported in North Jutland and Scania.

===== Denmark =====
Folklorist Axel Olrik reported other variants from Denmark: one from Vendsyssel, one from Himmerland, two from Vestjylland (one in Vedersø, the other in Ulborg), and two from the island of Sjælland (Zealand) (one from South Zealand, other from West Sealand). In the same vein, Laurits Bodker identified that three variants from North Jutland continue with the heroine meeting Kong Svan and Kong Trana in the second part of the story, which led him to consider them part of a regional tradition.

The variant from Vendsyssel, translated by Klara Stroebe as King Dragon, continues with the banishment of the queen by the false hero Red Knight. Then, she goes to the woods and two giant birds, a swan and a crane, perch on a branch, each on either side of her. They beg to be given food, and the queen does. The two birds become human again, and tell her their names: King Stork and King Crane. Both want to marry the woman, now that she has broken their curse. At the end of the tale, the queen prepares a dinner with her new suitors and King Dragon, and, since the meal is salty, King Dragon makes a toast to the queen's health. She chooses to remain with King Dragon.

===== Sweden =====
Folklorist Andrew Lang translated and published a Swedish variant in his Pink Fairy Book with the title King Lindorm. The first part of story follows the tale type very closely, with the birth of the serpent boy and the marriage with the human maiden. In the second part of the story, the (now human) King Lindorm goes to war and leaves his expecting wife in her stepmother's care. His wife gives birth to twin boys, but the evil stepmother writes to her stepson-in-law that the queen gave birth to whelps. A faithful servant of King Lindorm hides the queen and her sons in the castle, but she moves out to a hut in the forest where a man named Peter lives. By living with him, the queen discovers Peter made a pact with "The Evil One" and is supposed to meet him in a dense forest. The queen decides to rescue his contract with the help of three nuts that sprouted on her mother's grave. The tale was originally collected by Eva Wigström (sv), from Landskrona.

Eva Wigstrom collected another variant from Landskrona with the title Kung Lindorm och Kung Trana ("King Lindworm and King Trana"): a prince is cursed by his stepmother to be a man by day and lindworm by night. Whenever he married, he killed the bride on the wedding night. The princess from a neighbouring kingdom falls in love with the prince, but is afraid of her fate in case she marries him. Her father advises her to marry him anyway, but to wear three layers of linen clothing, and to remove each one as the lindworm sheds a layer of his skin each time. The plot works and she breaks the curse. She has a son while her husband is at war, but his stepmother writes him that she gave birth to a puppy. She is expelled from the castle with her son and wanders about until they reach another castle in the woods. She takes refuge in the castle and sees three birds alighting in a room and becoming human. They are princes, cursed by a witch to be birds by day and human at night. Their only salvation is if a woman comes to the castle and weave three shirts for them. The exiled queen comes out of hiding and offer her help. She disenchants the three men and marries the youngest of them, named King Trana. At the end of the tale, the queen has to make a choice between the King Lindworm and her new husband, King Trana.

Clara Stroebe published a variant from Södermanland, titled The Girl and the Snake. Stroebe compared it to the Danish "King Dragon".

Olrik also reported Swedish variants from Scania: one collected by Eva Wigström in West Scania, and another from South Scania, collected by Nicolovius.

==== Germany ====
German folklorist Hans-Jörg Uther, in the Folktale Catalogue of the German-speaking Area, classifies German variants as type 433B, "König Lindworm". According to Uther's index, the type includes "disparate" narratives about a heroine marrying an animal and releasing him from his curse by kissing him or sharing his bed, or wearing more shirts than his animal skins.

Ludwig Bechstein published the tale Siebenhaut (de) ("Sevenskins"), wherein a count's wife, being insulted by her husband and called "a snake", gives birth to a snake. When the snake is twenty years old, it asks his mother to procure him a wife. A maiden, instructed by an angel in a dream, dresses in seven layers of clothing in order to redeem her husband and break his enchantment.

==== Austria ====
In a tale from South Germany, collected by Austrian scholars Ignaz and Joseph Zingerle with the title Die Schlange ("The Snake") and sourced from Absam, a count's wife gives birth to a serpent son who lives in his own chamber. When the snake is twenty years old, it requests his mother to find him a wife. On her wedding night, the maiden wears seven layers of clothing, as she was instructed to do, and to dispose of each layer as her husband sheds his own layers of snakeskin. According to folklorist Elfriede Moser-Rath, the tale collected by the Zingerles is a form of the "Animal as Bridegroom", type AaTh 433B, found "mainly" in the eastern and southern German-speaking areas, while it appears in Nordic regions as König Lindwurm.

==== Ukraine ====
In a South Russian/Ukrainian variant collected by Ukrainian folklorist Ivan Rudchenko with the title "Уж-Царевич і Вірна Жона" ("Snake-Prince and his Wife"), a childless Tsaritsa is instructed to catch a pike, cook its head and eat it. She gives birth to a serpent. Soon after, her serpent son wants to be married, so she has every maiden of the kingdom brought before him to choose, but he rejects them all. Lastly, a woman with twelve daughters sends eleven of her daughters to the selection, but her youngest insists she be brought to the serpent tsarevich. The Tsar orders her to be taken to his presence, but she asks to be brought 20 sets of chemises, 20 pair of shoes, 20 linen kirtles and 20 woolen kirtles. She wears them to the bedchambers and casts off each layer as the serpent prince sheds 20 layers of skin and becomes human. The prince, now human, warns his wife that his parents must not know what happened, but she tells her parents-in-law and her husband disappears. She goes on a quest for him. She visits the Mother of the Winds, the Mother of the Moon and the Mother of the Sun and gains a silver apple, a golden apple and a diamond apple, which she uses to trade for three nights with her husband, who is to be married to an Empress. The tale was translated into English by Robert Nisbet Bain with the title The Serpent-Tsarevich and his Two Wives.

==== Serbia ====
Vuk Karadžić collected and published a Serbian variant titled Zmija mladoženja ("The Snake Bridegroom"): a queen wishes for a son, even if it is a serpent. A serpent prince is born and, when he comes of age, requests his mother to arrange a marriage with the king's daughter. After doing three tasks for the king, the serpent prince marries her. She discovers he is a handsome human prince when he takes off the snakeskin at night and conspires with her mother-in-law to burn the snakeskin. Croatian folklorist Maja Bošković-Stulli also classified the tale as type AaTh 433B.

==== Portugal ====
In a Portuguese variant collected by Adolfo Coelho with the title O Príncipe Sapo ("The Prince a Toad"), a queen wishes that God may give her a son, even if it is a frog. It so happens and a frog son is born. The king announces that whoever comes forth to raise and rear the frog prince shall have him for husband and the entire kingdom. A woman introduces herself to the king and raises the frog. As she does so, she notices that the frog is no ordinary animal. She has a dream about a voice telling her to marry the frog and on the wedding night wear 7 skirts, to take each skirt off as the frog sheds one of its skins. The maiden disenchants the prince, who reveals he is human, but prefers to use the frog skin. His wife tells the king and queen the situation and they burn the seven frog skins. The prince tells his wife he will disappear and if his wife ever sees him again, to give him a kiss on the mouth.

==== Spain ====
Spanish scholar Julio Camarena calls type 433B El príncipe serpiente mata a las novias ariscas/antipáticas ("The serpent prince kills the unpleasant brides"). In his joint work with Spanish scholar Maxime Chevalier, the Spanish Folktale Index, type 433B is termed El príncipe serpiente [sapo] pide esposa ("The serpent [frog] prince asks for a bride").

==== Albania ====
In an Albanian tale collected by Johann Georg von Hahn with the title Das Schlangenkind ("The Snake-Child"), a king has no son. His wife is friends with the vizier's and they express their wishes to marry the prince to one of the vizier's three daughters, but the queen has no son. The queen says that God will provide her with a child, even if it is a snake. It just so happens. The snake prince grows large and asks his mother to marry one of the vizier's daughters. The two eldest refuse, but the youngest is forced to accept on penalty of the snake killing her entire family. The youngest is advised by an old woman to marry the snake anyway, but reveals he is in fact a handsome prince. The girl follows through with the marriage. On the wedding night, she wears 40 layers of clothing and takes off one by one as her snake husband sheds each of his 40 layers of skin. He becomes a normal human and tells his wife not to tell the queen. The princess breaks his trust. In return, he "closes her womb" and disappears. (Note: In Balkanic variants of tale type ATU 425A, the supernatural husband curses his wife not to give birth to their child for a long period of time until she finds him again.) The princess dresses as a nun and goes on a quest for him. An old woman directs her to a pool of stagnant water she must drink from and compliment it; she then must ask for the earth to crack open and swallow her. On her new underground journey, she helps the three sisters of the sun and is gifted with a walnut, a hazelnut and an almond. At the last leg of her journey, the princess cracks opens the nuts to use its contents to buy three nights in her husband's bed from a false bride (tale type ATU 425A).

In an Albanian tale published by Post Wheeler with the title The Girl who took a Snake for a Husband, in a kingdom, a tradition holds that the princess must cast apples to the crowd to select their husbands. The third and youngest princess, called Lukja, throws hers into a poor seller's cart, where a snake was hiding in. Worried about her lot, she consults with a Wise Woman, who reveals the snake is more than it seems, and that she can disenchant him by wearing 40 layers of silken robes, and instructs the girl to undress each layer as her snake husband loses each of his 40 scales. On the wedding night, princess Lukja does as instructed and he becomes a handsome man. The man takes off his snakeskin, but does not tell his true identity. They live as man and wife, even bearing the brunt of the other princesses' mockery. One day, on a celebration, the snake husband decides to dance with his wife in human form. Suspecting something is amiss, Lukja's sisters visit her home and notice the snakeskin. The princesses burn it and the snake man begins to fell dizzy. Lukja runs home and sees the ashes, then returns to her husband, who has vanished. Saddened and not knowing what to do, Lukja consults with the Wise Woman again, and learns the whole story: her husband is the son of the Snake King who lives in the Underworld, and has come to the "white world" with a snake skin that allowed him to be a snake by day and a man by night. Lukja decides to go there herself, but is warned that its entrance is very dangerous to enter, and that down there she will meet a Shtriga, "the grandmother of all the witches", before she even finds her husband. Lukja crosses through the passage with one of her husband's scales as protection amulet and reaches the confines of the Underworld, a place of a red sun, a green sky and black trees. She meets the Shtriga, performs three tasks for her with the help of a magic bag, and reaches the Snake Kingdom. Lukja learns that her father-in-law has become deaf, the mother-in-law has lost her speech, and her husband is blind, and that the only cure are the objects that she received as payment from the Shtriga.

==== North Macedonia ====
In a Judeo-Spanish variant summarized by scholar Reginetta Haboucha and sourced from Skoplje, a childless queen longs to have a son, envying the fact that even a snake has its brood. For her wishes, she is cursed to bear a snake son. When he is born, every nursemaid is killed by him. A local stepmother sends her step-daughter to attend the snake prince, but she survives the ordeal. When the snake prince desires a bride, the stepmother sends the girl again, who once again survives the attempt by following the advice of her dead mother. She disenchants the snake prince and gives birth to her first son, but her stepmother expels her from the kingdom. In her wanderings, the princess meets another prince, who is cursed to become alive during the night and to fall into a dead-like state during the day. They live as husband and wife and she becomes pregnant again. She gives birth to her second son and her second husband comes in the night to rock the baby with a lullaby (tale type AaTh 425E, "Enchanted Husband Sings Lullaby").

In a South Macedonian tale titled "Трите волшебни прачки" ("Three Magic Rods"), a queen prays to have a son, and gives birth to a snake. However, her labour is a hard one. Meanwhile, in another land, convinced by his eight-year-old daughter, a king marries the girl's female teacher, but the woman begins to despise the princess. Back to the first queen, at least 72 midwives have died while trying to deliver the snake prince. On suggestion of her stepmother, the princess is sent as a midwife, because she secretly wants to get rid of her stepdaughter. The girl goes to her mother's grave and the woman's spirit advises her daughter to plant two rods, one yellow and one red, in front of the palace, and tells the prince to come through the green one. The method works, and the prince is born. Years later, the girl's stepmother sends her to teach the prince. Once again, her mother's spirit advises her to take a yellow rod to the lessons. Finally, the snake son wants to marry the same girl who helped in his delivery. The girl receives help from her dead mother on how to disenchant the snake prince: take a red rod and wear 40 layers of garments on the wedding night, then remove the prince's 40 layers of snakeskin.

==== Romani people ====
===== Romani-Serbian =====
In a Romani-Serbian tale titled "Змија човек" ("Snake Man", "Snake Youth"), published by academic Rajko Đurić, a couple have a daughter. The girl goes to school and her female teacher convinces to kill her mother to open the way for the teacher to marry the girl's father. After some insistence, the girl agrees, but does not know how to do so; the teacher instructs the girl to ask her mother for some honey, and she is to push the woman inside the honey pot to drown her. It happens thus, and the girl kills her own mother, then tells her father she drowned by accident. The man buries his wife and marries the teacher. Meanwhile, an emperor's daughter becomes pregnant, despite being a virgin, and cannot give birth; midwives are summoned to help, but are found dead in the morning, killed by the snake that comes out of the princess to strangle the midwives. The girl's stepmother learns of this and offers the girl's services as midwife to the princess, intent on having her killed. The emperor orders the girl to spend a night with the princess, but she runs to her mother's grave for counsel. The mother's voice complains that her daughter is not giving her rest neither in this world, nor in the next, but after learning of her daughter's plight, advises her: she is to stay with the princess and grab the snake as soon as it emerges and bathe it. The girl does as instructed and the snake leaves the princess's body. After a while, the snake son wants to go to school and asks his mother who could teach him; the princess replies that it should be the one that helped in his delivery. The girl learns of this and goes to cry on her mother's grave. The mother's spirit advises her again: she is to collect forty-one twigs ("шибљику", in the original), bathe the snake, hit him with the twigs and ask him if he has learned. Lastly, when the snake is twenty, he asks the princess whom he should take as a wife, and the princess answers: the one who helped in his delivery and taught him. The girl goes to her mother's grave for counsel a third time, and her mother's spirit advises her to wear forty-one shifts for the wedding night; the snake will ask her to remove a layer of shift, but she is to retort he should remove a shift first. The girl dons the forty-one shifts, goes to the wedding chambers and tells the snake he should remove one of his shifts first, then she will do the same. After he removes forty-one shifts, he turns into a human youth permanently.

Sometime after, the now human snake son goes to war, leaving his wife unprotected. The stepmother sends the emperor's grandson a false letter informing that his wife was unfaithful, and he writes back, saying that she should leave the castle and go somewhere else. Unaware of her stepmother's interference, the girl leaves the snake husband's palace and wanders off in the world. As night falls, she reaches a graveyard and sleeps on a grave, right on top of a dead person's head. The dead person complains that his head hurts, so the girl moves down to lie on top of his heart. The dead voice complains again, this time about how his heart hurts, and the girl moves to lie atop the feet. The dead voice complains a third time, that his feet are hurting. The girl questions where she could sleep, and a hole opens in the grave, as the voice bids her come down and she will fare well. The girl does so and meets a dead man inside the grave. They live together, and she becomes pregnant, so the dead man sends her to his mother's house. The girl reaches the dead man's mother's house and explains the situation; the dead man's mother places the girl in the henhouse, but does not believe that she is expecting her son's child, since the youth is dead. At midnight, the dead man comes to talk to the girl and ask where she is sleeping. The girl replies that she is lying on a stone and on a reed matting. The dead man laments, saying that if his mother knew, she would place the child in a cradle atop forty-one mattresses, cover him with forty-one quilts and have forty-one maidservants rock him. A maidservant overhears the exchange and tells the dead man's mother about, so she moves the girl and the baby to better accommodations. The next night, the dead man returns and comments that if his mother would weave a shirt and trousers for him in a single night, he would return home and never leave again. The mother eavesdrops on their conversation, and goes to weave a shirt and pair of trousers in a single night, then hangs them in the window. The dead man returns home, puts on the garments, and returns to life. Back to the now human snake husband, he is discharged from the army and returns home. He discovers his wife has been faithful to him, after all, and departs to search for her. He reaches the town where she is living with the second husband. He makes a complaint against the dead man who has returned to life and takes the case to court. The judge decides on a test to settle the dispute: a lamb should be roasted and placed before the girl for her to eat, but both men are to hold a wine glass for her drink; whoever she reaches for first, shall be her husband. They roast a lamb and she eats; she then reaches for the first man's glass, in the hand of the snake man. She returns home and leaves her child with the second husband.

===== Romani-Kelderari =====
In a Romani-Kelderari tale from Russia, titled "Змееныш" ("Little Snake"; "Snakeling"), collected in 1986, from informant named Rita Mihai, in Peri station, in Leningrad Oblast, a couple live together and are childless, to their sadness. One day, the man goes to fetch firewood in the forest when he hears a voice calling his father and asking to be taken with him. The man is surprised, and the voice indicates they are under a leaf: a little snake. The snakeling wants to be taken to the man's house to be his son. The man is happy to have a child, and takes the little animal home to present it to his wife as their son. The wife is shown the snakeling and they live together. The snakeling lives in a small bakest of twigs, but grows up and grows larger, so he needs to be moved to another bed. He suggests the couple build him a proper house, and they build a barn. The snake grows to large size and tells his parents he wants to be married. The man questions who would marry him, but the snake insists he goes find him a bride, and with a local tsar and his daughter. Despite the man fearing the danger, he goes to talk to the tsar and propose on his son's behalf. He pleads so insistently, the tsar takes pity on him and allows his daughter to marry the old man's son. The old man takes the princess to the granary to meet the snake. During the night, the snake tells the princess to sleep; while she is sleeping, the snake slithers on her, coils around her body and sucks her blood. The old man finds the princess dead in the morning, and confronts the snake son about, but the snake says that it is not his business. A week later, the snake asks his human father to arrange him another bride from another king. The old man goes to talk to the second king, who orders for a crystal bridge to be built between the house and the palace, plant grapevines on a bridge, and have ripe grapes on a plate. The old man informs the snake about it, and during the night, the snake blows and everything appears overnight. The second king gives away his daughter to the old man, who brings her to the snake son. Once again, the snake coils around the bride and sucks her blood, killing her. The old couple is desperate for the second dead girl, but the snake son assures everything will be fine. After a month, the snake son asks to be married again, and this time he suggests he can marry the cobbler's beautiful orphan daughter. The old man goes to talk to the cobbler and ask for his daughter in marriage on his son's behalf. The cobbler's daughter cries about being married to a serpent, but the cobbler simply accepts it as her fate. The girl then asks to pay a visit to her mother's grave for counsel and to say her goodbyes. At night, the girl goes to the cemetery. However, it is very dark, so she cries out for the moon to light her way to her mother's grave. She reaches her mother's grave and cries for her situation. The mother's voice comes from the grave and advises her: she is to take twelve skirts, twelve chemises, twelve bodices, twelve headscarves on her body to the wedding night; the snake will ask her to remove the heavy garments, but she is to ask him to shed a snakeskin, since he is a man under a spell and, by disenchanting him, she will take him as her destined husband. The girl thanks her mother, returns home and dons the layers of clothes on her, then marries the snake in a grand celebration. When they climb to bed, the snake asks the girl to remove her headscarf, but the girl replies that the snake should shed a skin first. They each remove the twelve layers of clothes and snakeskins, and the snake becomes a handsome youth of radiant beauty. The girl almost swoons in happiness. The following morning, while the now human snake son is sleeping, the cobbler's daughter takes the snakekins and burns them in a bonfire. The youth remains human, wakes up and kisses his wife, declaring she is his for a lifetime. They live together, and they become king and queen.

==== Malta ====
Folklorist Bertha Koessler-Ilg collected a Maltese tale she translated to German. In this tale, titled Die Schlange ("The Snake"), a king has a son who is about to be born, but has not for the past three days and nights. The monarch announces he will pay sacks of gold to whoever can help in his son's delivery. In the same city, a wicked woman reads the royal decree and goes to tell the king that her stepdaughter can help in the prince's delivery - which is a lie, since the girl is but a child at this time, and the king has killed many who failed to deliver the prince, so it is the stepmother's way to get rid of her stepdaughter. The girl is brought to the king and is given three days deadline to prepare herself. The girl goes to her mother's grave to cry, and her mother's ghost appears to comfort her: a maiden can help in the prince's delivery, which can be done by bringing him a bowl of milk, and her hands must only touch the milk, and nothing else. The girl then goes to the king and requests a bowl of milk; a snake is born to the queen, whom the king will raise as his son. Some time later, the king is looking for a wet nurse, the snake has killed three prior candidates. The stepmother convinces the king to bring her stepdaughter again as the prince's wet nurse. The girl, being given three days again, goes to cry on her mother's grave, and is again advised by her spirit: fill two bags of milk and attach them to her breast. The girl feeds the snake child with milk, and the king, noticing the connection between his snake son and the girl, lets her live in the palace with them. Time passes and the snake prince grows up and wishes to marry. Despite some reservations regarding his status as a snake, the prince issues a proclamation for ellibigle girls to be the prince's bride, for they will inherit the kingdom. One girl marries the prince, who coils around the bride on the wedding night and strangles her. After three other victims, the king marries the prince to the girl who helped in his delivery. The tale then explains the prince remains in snake form during the day, and removes his seven snakeskins at night, to his bride's delight. This goes on for some time, and the snake prince's wife wishes to have him in human form permanently and asks him how to turn him. The snake prince then emphasizes that his instructions must be followed to the letter, for he also wants to live as human with her: she it to not let any source of light touch his body for three days straight, the city must not be illuminated, nor any sound must be made, neither by humans nor by animals, and at last the seven snakeskins must be burnt. The prince's wife reports the information to the king, who issues a decree forbidding lighting any light source and making any sound in the kingdom. After obeying the prohibition, they burn the prince's seven snakeskins, turning him human permanently. The now human snake prince then becomes king and his wife the queen.

==== Bulgaria ====
In the Bulgarian tale corpus, tale type ATU 433B is indexed as "Змия съпруг" ("Snake Husband") or "Die Schlange als Ehemann" ("The Snake as Husband"). In the Bulgarian tale type, a snake (dog or pig) son is born to human parents; years later, he wants to marry the princess and fulfills the king's requests to provide wonderful items; the heroine discovers her animal husband is a youth underneath it and burns the animal skin, keeping him human forever. Alternatively, the heroine marries the snake groom and, on the wedding night, puts on several (or nine) dresses and removes them when the snake groom sheds his snakeskins one by one - which leads to his disenchatment.

In another Bulgarian type, derived from a single Bulgarian variant and classified as *433B, "Завареница се омъжва за змия, при раждането на която бабува" or "Stieftochter heiratet den Drachen, bei dessen Geburt sie Hebamme war" ("Stepdaughter marries dragon to whom she was a midwife to"), an old woman wishes to have a son, even if it is a snake; midwives come to deliver the snake baby and it bites them all to death; a woman sends her stepdaughter to be the prince's midwife to die, but she goes to her mother's grave for counsel and survives; the stepmother tries to kill her again by sending her to tutor the prince and eventually to marry him, since he has killed every bride, but the girl survives by following her dead mother's advice and disenchants the dragon into a human youth.

==== Ubykh people ====
In a tale collected by Georges Dumézil from Ubykh teller Alemkeri Hunç, La femme qui épousa un serpent et un mort ("The woman who married a serpent and a dead man"), a prince and his wife have a serpent as a son, which they give to a woman to rear and suckle. When the serpent prince is fifteen years old, his parents order the woman to give her daughter as wife to the serpent. Before the girl goes to marry the prince, a neighbour advises her to wear a hedgehog skin as chemise. On the wedding night, her serpent husband insists the girl takes off the skin, but she replies he must take off his. She disenchants her husband, who becomes a fine youth. One day, the now human prince goes to a hunt and orders the servants to forbid his wife to have any contact with any stranger while he is away. However, his father-in-law falls ill and the girl visits her father. Her step-mother takes her to the forest to get some herbs, while she dresses her own daughter as the girl and passes her off as the serpent prince's true wife. Meanwhile, the girl becomes lost in the woods and finds her way to a hut. Inside the hut, a tomb opens up and a youth comes out of it, eats food from a table and returns to the tomb. The next day, they meet each other. The days pass and they live as man and wife, and a child is born to them. Dumézil also classified the tale as type TTV 106 (of the Turkish Catalogue) and AaTh 433B (Aarne-Thompson Index).

==== Georgia ====
Georgian scholarship registers its own tale type for the second part of the story (exiled heroine finds a dead man). In this Georgian type, numbered -446*, "Husband Seemingly Dying at the Daytime", the heroine finds a man at a church, who dies during the day and revives at night. They marry, she bears him a son; he is later captured and dies for good. The heroine goes to the Mother of the Sun for a cure. (Note: Author Sigrid Früh collected a variant of Georgian tale type -446* from a Russian exile who lived in Georgia.) Georgian scholarship noted that this narrative sequence was "contaminated" with type 433B, "The Prince as Serpent". In another line of scholarship, Georgian scholar Elene Gogiashvili noted that the story Dead Under the Sun was "related" to the international tale type ATU 425E, "Enchanted Husband Sings Lullaby". In the story, the heroine enters the chapel in search of shelter and finds a coffin with the corpse of a youth inside and a bed; at night, after sunset, the youth, who is not dead at all, comes back to life to eat some bread and wine; he finds the heroine and they tell each other their experiences, and the youth reveals he is a prince cursed by God to die during the day and revive at night after shooting at the Sun; eventually, the heroine becomes pregnant and the youth sends her to his mother's castle to give birth in safety; at his mother's castle, he arrives and asks how fares his wife and child.

==== Finland ====
In a 1988 publication, Finnish folklorist Pirkko-Liisa Rausmaa indicated tale type AT 433B, Hirviö - sulhanen ("The Monster Bridegroom"), is reported in Finland. In the tale type, a couple have a snake for a son who demands brides every night, and kills every bride every night, until a wise girl manages to disenchant him. However, in the Finnish tales, the monstrous son is an alder log ("leppäpölkky", in the original); in three variants from Viena (White Sea Karelia), the bridegroom is a son fashioned from an alder log. Despite this difference, Rausmaa recognized that the tales "clearly represented" tale type AT 433B, which is known as Kung Lindorm in Scandinavia.

=== Africa ===
==== Sudan ====
Professor Samia Al Azharia John collected in 1974 a Sudanese-Arabic tale from a female teller in Khartoum. In her tale, a sultan has a snake son, to whom they bring young maidens to marry, but the snake son kills every maiden from the city, until there is only a single family left. The family consists of a stepmother with her own daughter, and her stepdaughter. In order to spare her own daughter, she sends her stepdaughter to be the snake prince's victim. The girl goes to her mother's grave to cry, and a gravekeeper appears to her to give seven sticks and some advice: whenever the snake tries to attack her, strike him with one of the sticks, until there are no more; this will cause him to shed his snakeskins and turn into a human prince. The girl takes the seven sticks and goes to marry the snake prince, then beats him with the seven sticks, until every snakeskin is shed, turning him into a human prince. The girl marries the human prince. The girl's stepmother, disgusted at her stepdaughter's survival, removes her clothes and banishes her from the palace, then dresses her own daughter to fool the now human snake prince. The prince comes and, discovering his real wife is not there, banishes the stepmother, then goes after his true wife. As for the girl, she wanders off until she reaches the infertile lands of a man planting in a wadi. As soon as the girl enters his lands, the harvest blooms and the goats produce milk, so the man takes the girl in. Some time later, the prince reaches the same land and, upon meeting his wife inside the man's house, gives her a huq (a box) for her to open, which she does. Then, the prince questions the man about the origin of his adoptive daughter, and gives him the huq for him to open, which he cannot do. Thus, everyone takes the matter to the qadi to decide whom the girl shall be with. Suddenly, as soon as the girl enters the qadi's office, the qadi, who was blind, has his vision restored. Even the qadi begins to dispute over the girl, so the matter is taken to the Great Qadi. Every party makes their case to have the girl, but the prince gives everyone the huq box to open. No one can, save for the girl (who is his wife who disenchanted him) and himself. Based on this, the jurors decide the girl shall be with the man who opened the huq box.

Al Azharia John translated to German an untitled Nubian tale provided by a male teller. In this tale, a king marries a barren woman who prays to Allah to be given a son, even if he is a snake. Thus a snake is born to them. The people bring maidens to be sacrificed to the snake prince, for fear of reprisal of the king over them. A local man has a second wife and three daughters, one from his first dead wife, and two from the second wife. He hears about the story and decides to send one of his second wife's daughters, since they can always have more children, but the woman, fearing for her daughter, convinces the man to send his own daughter by his first wife. The man relents and says goodbye to his daughter, uttering a blessing that archangels Gabriel and Michael to accompany her. The orphan girl goes to the palace, but meets with archangel Gabriel en route and the archangel gives her some incense, a whip and a silver armlet. The girl enters the king's palace and lights up the incense, then goes to meet the snake prince. When the snake tries to attack her, the girl shows him the silver armlet, and whips the prince, telling him that archangel Gabriel ordered him to become "a son of Adam" (human). It happens thus, and the snake prince becomes human. They spend the night together and the king finds them in the next morning. Satisfied his son is human, the monarch marries him to the girl. The kingdom is invited to the wedding, and the girl's stepmother, learning of her stepdaughter's fortune, takes her one of her own daughters and goes to the palace. The stepmother lies to the girl that her father cried to much it blinded him, thus she is needed back home. The girl suspects something at first, but accompanies her stepmother after much insistence. The girl is also asked to give her clothes and jewelry to her stepsister, and is abandoned in the graveyard by her stepmother. Alone in the graveyard, the girl eats some corn spread over a grave and drinks from a puddle, when the grave opens and its occupant, a man, appears to comfort her. The man, who listens to her sad tale, brings the girl to his widowed mother's home, who is crying for her lost son. The widowed mother is still crying for her son, when she opens his room the next morning and finds him alive and with the girl. A second wedding is arranged for the girl. The girl marries the revived man and gives birth to twin boys. Back to the now human snake prince, he realizes his bride is missing and goes to look for her, eventually reaching the village where the revived man lives. The snake prince meets the revived man and his wife and asks to place the silver armlet on the latter's wife: it fits, proving she is his bride. Both man begin to argue who shall be with her, when the girl rests by a crooked tree, which is suddeny restored to life and also wants to marry the girl for it was restored by her. The two men and the tree go to the qadi to solve the dispute, when the girl goes to suckle one of her crying twins and a drop of her breastmilk spills over the blind qadi's eyes, curing him. Now with four people arguing over her (the snake prince, the revived man, the tree and the cured qadi), the girl prays for Allah to escape this discussion, and she is promptly elevated to the Heavens.

Al Azharia John also published two variants from two Berber sisters, in the northern part of Sudan. In both tales, the animal groom is a crocodile: in one, he is born of his parents, in the other, he hides in an old woman's basket. At the end of both tales, the heroine disenchants him by beating the crocodile with palm leaves given to her by a mysterious helper.

==== Southern Africa ====
Africanist Sigrid Schmidt stated that "King Lindworm" was "particularly widespread" in Southern parts of Africa. In African tales (for instance, from the Sotho, Xhosa and the Zulu), a snake is born to a royal couple, who hides the snake son, until one day he decides to get married. In some variants, his future bride is repulsed by his snake appearance and flees from him, and he goes after her. The snake creature's skin is torn out by blades put in the way and he becomes a man. In some tales, the human-animal marriage occurs to ensure access to bodies of water for the people.

==== Cameroon ====
In a tale collected in Cameroon from Peul teller Goggo Addi with the Fula title Burba and translated to French as Bourba, a king has no children, so he prays to God to be given one. A concubine of the king becomes pregnant ("concubine", in the French translation, a term Ursula Baumgardt explained to mean a woman of servant origin who gives birth and obtains her freedom). One day with the Sun at noon, she goes near a river and sees a serpent come out of water, roll around on the ground, then return to the water. The concubine makes a wish to God for her to become pregnant with anything she can give birth to, and the serpent crawls out of the water and into her womb. She returns to the palace and announces she is pregnant, to the king's happiness. A snake is born to the king, which he locks in a cage underground and feeds with grasshoppers and scarabs. Meanwhile, another woman becomes pregnant and gives birth to a normal human son at the same time as the serpent. Years later, when the human son has grown up and is ready to find a bride, the king arranges a wedding between his serpent son and potential brides. Many girls are given to him, but he kills them all. Elsewhere, a man lives with his two wives and a daughter by each one. One of his wives dies and the other begins to hound her stepdaughter, forcing her to do all the housework. The woman forbids the girl from going to a celebration. The girl, named Burba (Bourba, in the French translation), sits by a river, when a djinn appears, combs her hair and embellishes her. The girl becomes beautiful and goes to the king's event. The king's men discover her and wish to take her as the snake prince's wife. Burba's father agrees to let the snake prince have his daughter. The girl meets the djinn again, who advises her how to disenchant the prince: burn the snakeskins and force the snake to remove his boubou (a traditional garment). By doing so, Burba disenchants the snake prince to human form and marries him.

=== Americas ===
==== Panama ====
In a Panamanian tale titled El príncipe serpiente ("The Serpent Prince"), a king and a queen spend years trying to have a child, when they eventually have a son, a serpent. As time goes by, the snake grows too large for the palace, so they build a gallery to house him. When he is older, the serpent prince tells his parents he wishes to be married, but no one wants to marry him. He threatens to destroy the entire kingdom, and his parents bring him a bride, but he kills her. This continues with a succession of girls, until there is only a poor, but beautiful girl. The remaining girl's grandmother advises her to take a match, a kindling stick and a wire to her bed at night. He marries the last girl and she sleeps in his bed, then lights up the kindling (yesca) to see her bridegroom, and finds a handsome human prince. However, a drop of wax falls on him and he turns back to his serpent form. The serpent prince wakes up and tells the girl she can be her saviour, if she burns the serpent. The girl starts a fire to burn the snake, and, after spending the whole night stoking the fire that it almost burns half of the town, the serpent is no more, and the prince becomes human forever. He marries the poor girl.

==== Brazil ====
In a tale from Brazil with the name O Príncipe Lagartão, the queen wishes to have a son, even if it is a lizard. Nine months later, she is on the brink to deliver her baby, a voice from inside her womb says it wants a girl named Maria to deliver him. They find the girl and she helps in the prince's delivery. She also raises him. When he is older, the lizard prince wants to marry Maria. The girl goes to her godmother, Virgin Mary, who advises her to wear seven skirts and to take a bowl of perfumed water to help disenchant him.

==== French Guiana ====
In a manuscriptural tale collected in French Guiana with the title La Belle et le Monstre ("The Beauty and the Monster"), a king and a queen have a monster for a son. One day, he announces he wants to marry. The queen questions who would want to marry him, and he issues an ultimatum: he is to be married in eight days, otherwise he will devour her. The queen finds a possible bride for her son: up the mountains live a poor old woman with three daughters. The queen explains the reason for her visit and promises to pay her money. The woman is reluctant to part with any of her daughters, since she knows the prince is a monster, but the queen insists and the woman relents. The queen takes the eldest daughter with her and they pass by an old woman on the road. The old woman asks the girl about their destination, and the eldest daughter says it does not concern the old woman. The monster-prince marries the girl and devours her overnight. Eight days later, the prince says he wants to get married, and the queen returns to the old mother and her daughters for another bride. The queen takes the middle sister and they pass by the same old woman on the road, to whom the middle sister is rude. The middle sister marries the monster, and is devoured at night. Lastly, the prince tells his mother he wishes to be married again, and the queen cries that he already killed two brides already. Still, the prince threatens to devour her, and the king scolds him for threatening his mother. However, the queen returns to the old mother up the mountain for the remaining daughter. The old mother does not want to give up her youngest daughter for fear of her sharing her other sisters' fate. The queen takes the youngest daughter and they pass by the old woman on the road. The old woman notices the girl's sad face and asks her about her destination. The girl answers she is to be devoured. In return, the old woman says she is a witch, tells the girl if her sisters were kind, they would have survived, and advises the girl how to disenchant the prince: don three dresses, one white, one purple and one blue, enter the wedding chambers and ask the prince to undress first, before she does. The girl marries the monster prince. On the wedding night, the monster orders the girl to undress, but the girl retorts that he should undress first. They both remove their clothes, the girl her dresses and the prince his skins. After he removes the third skin, the skin bursts open to reveal a charming prince. The girl and the prince go to bed together, and the tale ends.

== Parallels ==
Croatian folklorist Maja Bošković-Stulli noted that the theme of the Snake-Bridegroom is very popular in Serbo-Croatian epic songs. In most of the ballads of this type, both heroine and the serpent's mother burn the animal skin; the serpent may die or live, according to the version.

== See also ==
- Shapeshifting, Monstrous bridegroom
- Eglė the Queen of Serpents (Lithuanian fairy tale)
- The Green Serpent (French literary fairy tale)
- The Snake Prince (Indian fairy tale)
- The Enchanted Snake (Italian literary fairy tale)
- Tulisa, the Wood-Cutter's Daughter (Indian fairy tale)
- Princess Himal and Nagaray (Kashmiri folktale)
- Champavati (Assamese folktale)
- The Ruby Prince (Punjabi folktale)
- The King of the Snakes (Chinese folktale)
- Princess Baleng and the Snake King (Rupkai folktale)
- The Story of the Hamadryad (Arakanese folktale)
- The Origin of the Sirenia (Cambodian folktale)
- The Lizard With the Seven Skins
