= The Bewitched Prince (Italian folktale) =

The Bewitched Prince (Italian: Il principe stregato) is an Italian fairy tale from Piemonte, about a prince transformed to draconic form, but he is disenchanted by a maiden who marries him by following her dead mother's advice. The tale is part of the more general cycle of the Animal as Bridegroom, and is classified in the Aarne–Thompson–Uther Index as tale type ATU 433B, "King Lindworm", a type that deals with maidens disenchanting serpentine husbands.

== Sources ==
The tale was originally collected by Italian scholar Domenico Comparetti, and sourced from Monferrato.

== Summary ==
In this tale, a king has a son. By the time the prince is four years old, he turns into a four-legged dragon with a tail, so they hide him in the back patio of the castle. Meanwhile, a servant of the king has a beautiful girl that goes to school. The girl's female schoolteacher hates the girl's mother, so she tricks the girl into drawing her mother towards the coal box and close the lid on her, on the false premise the woman will become queen this way. It happens thus, and the girl only kills her mother, and she feels immense guilt about it. The schoolteacher marries the girl's father and both have a daughter that is so ugly, not the devil would want for sister. Now hating her stepdaughter more than ever, the woman goes to the king to lie that her stepdaughter could teach the dragon prince. The king sends for the girl to tutor the prince, but she goes to her mother's grave to cry. Her mother's spirit advises her to open the dragon's room's window and bring in a cartload of bread, meat, and sweets; he will wag his tail in happiness and then she will be able to teach him. The girl does as instructed and tutors the prince, receives her rewards and goes home. Later, the woman lies that her stepdaughter boasted she could marry the dragon prince. The king sends for the girl again, who goes to her mother's grave to cry. The mother's spirit advises her to bring three cartloads of clothes and don seven shirts on the wedding night; the prince will ask her to remove a shirt, but she is to reply he is to take off a skin too. The girl goes to marry the dragon prince and dons the seven shirts. He removes the dragon skins and she the seven shirts. After removing the seven layers of dragon skin, he becomes a handome youth and remarries his bride.

== Analysis ==
=== Tale type ===
The tale of Prince Lindworm is part of a multiverse of tales in which a maiden is betrothed or wooed by a prince enchanted to be a snake or other serpentine creature (ATU 433B, "The Prince as Serpent"; "King Lindworm"). In type ATU 433B, a queen gives birth to a son in snake form; years later, he wants to marry, and the king brings in maidens for him to marry, but he kills them; a mistreated stepdaughter is advised by a woman or her dead mother to don many shirts for the wedding night with the snake prince; she removes a shirt and tells the prince to remove one snakeskin; she then burns the skins to retain his human form.

Renato Aprile, editor of the Italian Index of Tales of Magic, listed the story under type AT 433, Il figlio serpente ("The Serpent Son"), more specifically under type AT 433B, a type which he considered to be an "abbreviated form" of type AT 425A. He also grouped under tale type 433 the subtype AT 433A, where the snake carries the heroine home with him and is restored to human form by her kiss.

=== Motifs ===
==== The lindworm's disenchantment ====
Scholar Jan-Öjvind Swahn, in his work about Cupid and Psyche and other Animal as Bridegroom tales, described that the King Lindworm tales are "usually characterized" by the motifs of "release by bathing" and "7 shifts and 7 skins". Similarly, according to Birgit Olsen, "in most versions" the heroine is advised by her mother's spirit to wear many shifts for her wedding night with the lindworm prince. In addition, according to Renato Aprile, editor of the Italian Index of Tales of Magic, tale type AT 433B contains the serpent husband, and the heroine being inspired by her dead mother and disenchanting him by burning his skin.

== Variants ==
Italian author Italo Calvino located "other versions" wherein the snake prince sheds off his seven skins in Tuscany, Campania, Sicily and Piedmont.

=== The Twenty-Seven Shirts ===
In a Friulian tale titled Li' vintisièt ciamesis ("The Twenty-Seven Shirts"), collected in Cordenons from an informant named Bidinost Iolanda, a king wants to have a child, but the queen replies to the king that she wishes to have a snake rather than a son. Thus, a year later, a snake is born to them. The king is upset that his son is a snake and a servant takes care of him. When he reaches the age of eighteen, he feels sad. The king sends the best doctors to treat him and they discover the snake son wishes to be married. The king issues a proclamation for any eligible girl to marry the prince, withholding that he is a snake. Potential brides come to the castle, but flee upon seeing the snake prince. In a village, a girl lives with her poor family who sometimes have nothing to eat. She goes to pray to the saints every holiday and place flowers for the dead in the cemetery. One night, she falls asleep, and a saint appears to her in a dream; he thanks the girl for her devotion, explains that the prince is a snake, and bids her put on twenty-seven shirts and a nice habit, then present herself to the king as the prince's bride. The saint also says she does not have to be afraid: even if the prince strikes her with his tail, but her many layers of shirt will protect her; she will remove the shirts and finally he will become a handsome youth. The saint bids her to follow his instructions to the letter, and the girl wakes up, then talks to her parents about her dream. Her father questions her daughter's plans, but buys her the twenty-seven shirts, and she introduces herself to the king, wanting to marry the prince. The king says that many brides have come and manifested their disgust with the prince. The girl says that she knows the prince is a snake, so the king sends her into his room. In the room, the snake prince approaches the girl and hits her with his tail, but touches the layers of shirts. When he reaches the last shirt, the snake himself has turned into a handsome youth. The king waits outside the door, and sees that his son has become human, and the monarch does not know whether to laugh or cry. Some servants bring the prince clothes, since he had never had clothes, and the king embraces his son for the first time. The queen sees her son in human form the first time, and apologizes for her wish that caused his birth as a snake. The kingdom celebrates the wedding of the prince with his saviour.

=== The Serpent Son ===
In a Friulian tale titled Al fi sarpìnt ("The Serpent Son"), collected from informant Vivian Emilia, in Cordenons, an old woman has no children, and sees the birds taking care of their chicks. She sighs that she wishes she could have a son, even if he is a snake ("bis"), and a snake comes to her. The woman locks the snake in a room, and does not acknowledge him. He grows larger with each passing year; after twenty years, the snake son tells the servant that his mother does not even call him, despite being his mother. He recognizes that he is a snake, but he is also her son, and now wishes he could marry. The woman, his mother, questions who would want to marry him, and the snake son tells her to call someone. The woman issues an announcement that she will transfer her wealth to anyone that will want to marry her son. A poor girl offers to marry, and, on the wedding night, the snake son tells her to lose a shirt. Afraid, the girl flees from the snake son. The woman finds another bride, who also flees in terror. Lastly, a very poor orphan girl with nothing and with no parents offers to marry the snake, goes to pray to the Saints and to pray for the souls of the dead. Suddenly, a mysterious voice tells her to don eleven shirts for the wedding night and when the snake tells her to lose the garment, she is to remove one; finally, the voice tells her to trust herself. The girl goes to the woman's house and agrees to marry the snake son, but, since she is too poor, she cannot buy eleven shirts. The woman buys the clothes and marries the girl to her son. On the wedding night, the girl removes a shirt, and the snake son removes a skin, becoming a handsome youth. They celebrate a grand wedding.

=== The Fate of the Queen ===
In a Friulian tale titled El destin de la regina ("The Fate of the Queen"), collected in Polcenigo, a queen has been married for years and has material possessions, but no child. One day, she goes to the mountains and sees a snake with its young, and wishes that God sends her a snake for a son. Three months later, she discovers she is pregnant, to the kingdom's happiness, and nine months later, she gives birth to her son: a snake. The queen understands that her snake son is her punishment for her hasty wish. A year or two later, the snake son sees children playing and wishes to have a companion; people of many ages are sent to him, counts, noblemen of upper and lower rank, but none wishes to be with the snake prince. A woman who married a man with three stepchildren says that her stepdaughter can keep the snake prince company. The little girl feels sad for living with her stepmother, and goes to her mother's grave to cry over not wanting to be with the snake. Her mother's voice tells her not to worry, for she will be safe. Years pass, and the monarchs try to find someone to teach the snake prince, who sees the children going to school. The royal couple try to find one to tutor the prince, but every potential tutor flees in terror after seeing the snake. They realize that the little poor girl who became the prince's companion can fulfill this role, so they send for her and she teaches him the letters. The snake prince grows up and, when he is twenty-two years old, he sees that there are couples about with their mates and wishes to marry the one that befriended and taught him. The king and queen agree to marry them to each other, since the poor girl has been kind to their son. However, when the girl hears about her upcoming marriage, she runs to her mother's grave for comfort. Her mother's spirit's voice tells her to marry the prince, for she will be very fortunate and he will become a handsome man, but she has to ask for an oven to be brought to the wedding chambers; at midnight, the snake prince will shed his skins, which she has to throw in the oven to burn them, for, after the third skin, he will be human for good. The girl follows her mother's instructions and agrees to marry the snake, but asks for an oven to be brought to the room. At night, the snake prince sheds his skins and the girl quickly picks them up and tosses them in the oven to burn them, keeping the prince human for good. The queen listens to the couple's conversation and believes that the girl has been killed. Suddenly, the door opens and out comes the prince in human form, who chastises his mother for, due to her wish, forcing him to be a snake for twenty years, but fortunately he found his bride. The tale was classified as type AT 433B, "Re Lindorm" ("King Lindworm").

=== Prince Scursuni ===
In a Sicilian variant collected by Laura Gonzenbach, Die Geschichte vom Principe Scursuni ("The Story of Prince Scursuni"), a despondent queen longs for a child, so she asks God to give her one, "even if it was a scursuni" (a kind of serpent). (Note: Jack Zipes notes that the "scursuni" translated to Ringelnatter in German, or a grass snake; also translated as scorzone, a venomous black snake.) God grants her wish: when in labor, every midwife drops dead at the sight of the baby. An evil stepmother sends her stepdaughter, a shoemakers's daughter, to suffer the same fate, but she helps in the prince's delivery. Years later, the serpent prince wants to marry. The king arranges a marriage with the weaver's daughter. At midnight in the bridal chamber, the prince casts off the serpent skin and asks his wife her origins; she reveals she is a weaver's daughter. Enraged, the prince yells he deserves only a princess for wife and kills the maiden. Another maiden suffers the same fate. Only the shoemaker's daughter is spared the grim fate because she lies about being a princess. They marry and she has a son, whom she hides from the royal family. One night, she reveals to the queen her son is an enchanted prince and only a certain method can break the curse: a white cloth is to be woven; an oven is to be heated for three days and three nights; his skin is to be tossed in the fire while someone throws the white cloth over him and holds him so that he cannot jump into the fire. The process works; the maiden disenchants him and reveals her humble origins. The tale was translated to Italian as La storia del Principe Scursuni and to English as Prince Scursuni.

=== King Scursuni ===
Folklorist Giuseppe Pitrè summarized an Italian tale collected in Noto. In this tale, titled Re Scursuni ("King Scursuni"), a widower promises his daughter he will only marry when the pair of shoes under his bed and a cap rot. Then, the heroine goes to the palace per her mother's instructions, donning 20 pairs of shoes, 20 dresses, 20 petticoats, 20 shirts, 20 handkerchiefs, and a pair of iron gloves, to serve as the queen's midwife. She helps in the delivery of the prince, who is a scorsoni (a type of snake).

== See also ==
- The Stepdaughter and the Black Serpent
- The Girl With Two Husbands (Greek fairy tale)
- Dragon-Child and Sun-Child (Armenian tale)
- Champavati (Indian tale)
- The Enchanted Snake (Italian tale)
- The King of the Snakes
- The Story of the Hamadryad
- The Origin of the Sirenia
