= The Stepdaughter and the Black Serpent =

Turkish fairy tale about a serpent bridegroom

Folk tale
- Name: The Stepdaughter and the Black Serpent
- Aarne–Thompson grouping: ATU 433B, "King Lindworm"
- Region: Turkey, Tokat Province
- Related: The Dragon-Prince and the Stepmother; The Girl with Two Husbands; Dragon-Child and Sun-Child

The Stepdaughter and the Black Serpent is a Turkish fairy tale collected by researcher Barbara K. Walker. The tale is part of the more general cycle of the Animal as Bridegroom, and is classified in the Aarne–Thompson–Uther Index as tale type ATU 433B, "King Lindworm", a type that deals with maidens disenchanting serpentine husbands. In the Turkish variants, however, the story can continue with the adventures of the banished heroine, who meets a man at a graveyard, rescues and marries him, and eventually is found by her first husband, the snake prince whom she disenchanted before.

== Source ==
The tale was originally collected from a sixteen-year-old source named Ayșe Guldemir, who originated from Tokat province and lived in Ankara, and archived in the Uysal–Walker Archive of Turkish Oral Narrative with the title The Stepdaughter and the Black Serpent.

== Summary ==
In this tale, a padishah rules a great kingdom, but sighs over the lack of an heir. One day, he prays to Allah to be given a son, even it he is a serpent. Allah hears his prayers and grants him one son: nine months later, a black serpent is born to the queen. Many nurses and maids try to rear the serpentine scion, but he bites them all to death, causing the kingdom to despair in trying to find one able to fulfill the task. In the same kingdom, a beautiful girl lives with her stepmother, who wants to get rid of her, and, upon hearing the padishah is looking for a nurse for the prince, insists her stepdaughter is available to take up the job. The girl is escorted by the royal guards to the palace, but asks to visit her mother's grave under some cypress trees. The girl goes to her mother's grave in search of counsel, and her mother's spirit advises her to prepare a two-handle golden box, with seven holes made in its lid and pour the milk of seven cows inside it, which will draw the snake prince to it. The girl goes to the palace and follows her mother's instructions, then places the box in a diamond cradle. This eases the snake's fury for some time, until the day the prince goes to their parents and announces his wish to be taught to read and write. The padishah agrees to fulfill his wish and summons a Hoca the next morning, whom the black serpent bites to death. A line of scholars ends up dying by the snake's bite, and the padishah, in desperation, turns to the girl who previously nursed the prince. The girl's stepmother, lying again, says her stepdaughter can also teach the prince. The girl goes to her mother's grave a second time and her spirit advises her to fetch a branch of a rosebush and a branch of holly, both sprouting from her grave, which she is to use to scold the prince if he tries to attack her: four times with the rosebush branch and one time with the holly. The girl does as instructed and, after forty days, the prince is taught to read and write. Later, the snake prince wishes to be married, and girls are brought to him as prospective brides, but he kill forty girls for the next forty nights, one per night. At last, the stepmother sends her stepdaughter as a bride to the snake prince, wishing to have her killed once and for all. The girl pays a visit to her mother's grave one more time, and is advised to wear forty hedgehog skins, which she is to remove one by one and ask the prince to remove each of the layers of snakeskin, and toss them all in the fire soon after. The girl is then brought to the snake and both remove each of the layers from both their vestments. The black serpent is disenchanted into a human prince and marries the girl. Back to stepmother, defeated, she enters an underbrush in the forest and becomes a yellow snake.

== Analysis ==
=== Tale type ===
In the Typen türkischer Volksmärchen ("Turkish Folktale Catalogue"), by Wolfram Eberhard and Pertev Naili Boratav, both scholars classified the Turkish tales as Turkish type TTV 106, "Die schwarze Schlange" ("The Black Snake"), which corresponds in the international classification to tale type AaTh 433. They also commented that the stories followed a two-part narrative: a first part, with the disenchantment of the snake prince, and a second one, wherein the expelled heroine meets a man in the graveyard and marries him.

The first part of the Turkish tale type corresponds, in the international Aarne-Thompson-Uther Index, to tale type ATU 433B, "King Lindworm": a serpent (snake, or dragon) son is born to a king and queen (either from a birthing implement or due to a wish); years later, the serpent prince wishes to marry, but he kills every bride they bring him; a girl is brought to him as a prospective bride, and wears several layers of cloth to parallel the serpent's skins; she disenchants him. Tale type ATU 433B, "King Lindworm", is part of the cycle of the Animal as Bridegroom, stories that involve a human maiden marrying a prince in animal form and disenchanting him. In addition, the second part of the Turkish tales follows what Georges Dumézil termed "The woman who married a Snake and a Dead Man".

Greek folklorist Georgios A. Megas considered that Greek variants showed a contamination between tale type 433B and subtype ATU 425E, "Enchanted Husband Sings Lullaby", where the pregnant heroine is sent by her lover, kidnapped by the fairies, to his mother's castle, where she can give birth in safety. He also noted that the combined narrative corresponded to Turkish type (TTV) 106, "Die schwarze Schlange" ("The Black Snake").

=== Motifs ===
==== The black snake-prince ====
Scholar Jan-Öjvind Swahn, in his work about Cupid and Psyche and other Animal as Bridegroom tales, described that the King Lindworm tales are "usually characterized" by the motifs of "release by bathing" and "7 shifts and 7 skins". Similarly, according to Birgit Olsen, "in most versions" the heroine is advised by her mother's spirit to wear many shifts for her wedding night with the lindworm prince.

== Variants ==
=== Distribution ===
Folklorist Stith Thompson noted that tale type 433B's continuation, with the heroine's adventures, occurs in the Near East. According to researchers Birgit Olsen and Warren S. Walker, and Greek scholars Anna Angelopoulou, Aigle Broskou and Michael Meraklis, the two-part narrative forms an East Mediterranean oikotype, popular in both Greece and Asia Minor. According to Gyula Németh, the first part of the tale is "very widespread" in Anatolia ("dieses in Anatolien stark verbreiteten Märchens", in the original).

=== Tales about snakes ===
==== The Snake Boy ====
In a Turkish tale collected from Ordu with the title Yılan oğlan ("The Snake Boy"), a padishah's son is born: a snake. The snake son grows up and is ready to be tutored, but he bites every candidate to death. In the same city, a man sends an orphan girl to be the prince's tutor. The girl says she will accept the job, but goes to her mother's grave for counsel. Her mother's spirit advises her to take two rose branches and use them on the prince to force him to complete his lessons. It happens thus. Later, the snake prince reaches marriageable age and they try to find him a suitable bride, but he kills every girl. He then demands as his bride the same girl that tutored him. The girl goes to her mother's grave again and her spirit advises her daughter to request a bridal dress made of forty hedgehog skins. Her request is fulfilled and she is brought to the snake prince. The girl tells the prince she will undo a layer of the dress if the prince removes one of his skins. It happens thus, and the girl, still following her mother's advice, prepares an oven and tosses the snakeskin along with the hedgehog skins to burn them. The snake prince is changed into a human youth, and father celebrates the fact. The now human prince marries the girl and they have many children.

==== Snake Prince (Sütçüler) ====
In a Turkish tale collected from a source in Sütçüler with the title Yılan Şehzade ("Snake Prince"), a padishah cries for not having children. One day, he goes for a walk and meets a white-bearded man, to whom he tells his woes. The other man comforts the king that his wife will bear him a son. In time, the queen becomes pregnant and is ready to give birth, but their son is black snake. When the king learns his son is a snake, he remembers his words. The midwife cannot deliver the child, for he bites everyone to death. The king suddenly recalls the daughter of a farmer that can help in the prince's delivery, and sends for her. The story then explains the girl lives with her father and his second wife. The padishah's soldiers come for the girl and escort her back to the palace. The girl asks to pay a visit to her mother's grave before she reaches the palace. At the graveyard, the girl cries on her mother's grave for what she can do to help the padishah, and a voice echoes from the grave, telling the girl to have a cage made with a glass window, place some milk inside and attract the snake with it. The girl goes to the padishah and asks for the glass cage to be made, which she uses to capture the serpentine prince. She also takes care of the prince and feeds him with milk. After seven years, the padishah decides it is time to teach the snake son, but the prince bites every teacher they bring him. Thus, the girl is brought to the palace to deal with the situation. She cries again on her mother's grave, and the woman's spirit advises her to gather forty rose sticks, thirty-nine she will hold in one hand to beat the prince when he leaves the cage and tries to bite her. Some time later, the snake prince wishes to get married, but every bride they bring to him he bites to death. The padishah sends for the girl again, who goes to cry on her mother's grave. Her mother's voice tells her that, on the wedding night, she is to order the prince to take off his skin first, then she will remove her own clothes, and burn all of the snakeskins. Thus, the girl marries the snake prince. On the wedding night, the prince orders the girl to remove her clothes, but the girl replies that her husband should remove his first. The prince takes off the snakeskin, which the girl burns at once. When she goes to see the prince, she finds a youth handsome as the full moon.

==== Snake (Karakuyu) ====
In a Turkish tale collected from informant Naciye Koyuncu, in Karakuyu village, with the title Yılan ("Snake"), a man lives in a meadow and has no children. One day, he finds a pair of snakes and wishes to God to have a son, like a snake. Thus, a snake son is born to the man's wife. Time passes, and the snake son asks his mother to find him a bride, for he wants to get married. Despite some reservation regarding who would want to marry a snake, the woman arranges a wedding to a girl. However, the snake kills the bride at night. Later, he asks to be married again, despite his mother's reservations about him killing his next bride. Still, a second girl is brought to him as another bride, and he kills her. Yet again, the snake son wants another bride, and his mother finds him one. The third girl goes to cry on her mother's grave before the wedding, fearing for her life due to being married to a snake. She lies asleep on the grave and has a dream: her mother's spirit appears in her dream, tells her the snake is human underneath the snakeskin, and advises her to wear a dress made of needles for her wedding, and for her to remove the layers of dress while the snake removes his skins. The girl wakes up and requests a dress made with needles. On the wedding night, the snake asks the girl to remove the dress, and the girl retorts for the snake to remove his skin first. They remove each other's clothes, until the snake becomes a human being. The girl then quickly burns the layers of snakeskin.

==== Snake Son (Yozgat) ====
In a Turkish tale collected from a source in Yozgat with the title Yılan Oglan ("Snake Son"), a man finds two snakes on the ground and prays to Allah to have a son, and would be happy if he is a snake. Thus, a snake is born to him and his wife. Years later, the snake asks his mother to find him a bride. The woman questions who would marry a snake, and the little animal insists she finds him a bride. His mother knocks on some doors until he finds a bride for him. The snake kills the bride as soon as she enters the room. Some time later, he asks his mother to find him another bride, who suffers the same fate as the first one. The snake's parents find him another bride for him, an orphan girl. The girl goes to her mother's grave to cry about marrying a snake, and her mother's spirit, in a dream, reveals the snake is human, and bids her daughter dons a wedding dress full of needles, which will protect her against the snake's attack with his tail; she is to ask the snake to remove a layer of skin as she removes a layer of her dress, and burn all layers of snakeskin. The girl asks her parents-in-law to provide a bridal dress studded with needles, and enters the wedding chambers. The dress deflects the snake's tail, and she bids him remove his layers of skin, just as she removes the dress. As soon as the snake removes all of the snakeskins, the girl tosses them in a fire to keep him human forever.

==== Black Snake (collected by Eflatun Güney) ====
In a Turkish tale collected by folklorist Eflatun Cem Güney with the title Karayılan ("Black Snake"), a sultan worries that his vast kingdom and possessions will fall into other people's hands and dissipate everything he has ever amassed. So, he prays to Allah to have a son. At first, his prayers appear not to be heard, until he is becoming old and prays that he is given a son, even if he is a snake. Thus, nine months, nine days and nine hours later, the sultan's wife is pregnant with a black snake, who does not wish to leave his mother's womb, biting everyone that tries to help in the delivery. The sultan's harem masters search for a midwife for the prince, when a woman in a house overhears their order and offer her stepdaughter as midwife by a hefty sum. A deal is made, and the woman sends her stepdaughter, who was born in the "Kadir Gecesi", so no trouble will befall her. The girl accompanies the harem's master, but wishes to visit her mother's grave in a graveyard under some cypresses. The girl cries on her grave, and her mother's spirit advises her to have a golden box ready for the snake prince, filled with the milk of seven cows; the prince will enter the box and she it to put him in a diamond cradle. It happens thus, and the black snake prince is finally born. The girl's stepmother is frustrated with her failed plan, and the prince is nursed with milk for seven months. After this time, he asks his father to be taught, but ends up killing every potential tutor that is brought to him. The stepmother learns of this and sends her stepdaughter to teach the snake prince, hoping that she dies in the process. The girl cries on her mother's grave again, and her mother's spirit advises to fetch a rose branch and a branch of dogwood ("kızılcık", in the original) from her grave; she is to beat him with the rose stem forty times ("kırk defa", in the original) and once with the dogwood. It happens thus, and the girl teaches the prince the letters. The following year, the prince asks his father to find him a wife, and they bring her a girl, but he kills her. The same fate befalls other fifty maidens, when the king is desperate enough to find another one. The stepmother learns of this and sends her stepdaughter again to marry the snake and die. However, the girl goes to her mother's grave for advice, and her spirit advises her to wear forty hedgehog skins to the wedding night, ask the prince to remove each of his snakeskins as she removes a layer, and burn them all at the end, since he will have become a handsome youth. The girl requests the castle's servants for forty skins and a green vest and marries the snake prince. On the wedding night, she bids the prince remove a layer of snakeskin just as she removes a layer of her dress, until the prince turns into a human youth. The girl then burns the snakeskins. The sultan is glad for his son's human transformation, and asks the stepmother "forty mules or forty knives". The stepmother utters no word and turns into a yellow snake.

==== Black Snake (Mugla) ====
In a Turkish tale collected from informant Durnamiye Aslan, from Dalaman, Mugla, and titled KARAYILAN ("Black Snake"), a padishah has no son, so his wife prays to Allah for a son in any form. Thus, a black snake is born to them. The snake prince grows up and asks his father to be married. They bring in the daughter of the richest person in the village, and they marry in a grand ceremony of forty days and nights. However, on the wedding night, the snake prince bites the bride to death. The same event happens to the bride's three sisters. Finally, the padishah brings in an orphan girl in the village as his bride, given by the girl's stepmother. The girl goes to cry over her mother's grave and begs for a solution. Her mother's spirit advises her to make a fur coat of hedgehog skin as her wedding dress, and, on the wedding night, when the prince orders her to remove the wedding dress, she is to command him to undress first, and to throw the snakeskin in the fire to burn. On the wedding night, the girl does as instructed and burns the snakeskin in the fire, turning the prince into a handsome youth, beautiful as the moon. In the morning, the padishah goes to check on his son's newest victim, since a coffin was already been commissioned and made, but finds the prince in human form drinking tea with his bride, and the tale ends.

==== Yılan Bey (Malatya) ====
In a Turkish tale collected from an informant in Malatya province, with the title Yılan Bey ("Snake Lord"), a padishah's wife is pregnant. Every midwife that tries to help in the baby's delivery is killed. In the same country, a woman lives with her stepdaughter whom she wants to get rid of, so she sends the girl to be the midwife. The girl asks for a day to prepare herself, and goes to her mother's grave to cry. She cries herself to sleep, and a white-bearded old man appears in her dreams and advises her: the prince is a snake, so she needs to place a bowl of milk in the room and leave. The girl goes to the palace with a bowl of milk and a glass, then leaves; a snake is born to the padishah, whom they name Yilan Bey. When the snake son reaches marriageable age, he wants to marry. All the girls given to him as bride die on the first night. The woman sends her stepdaughter to be the snake's bride, in hopes she dies this time. Once again, the old man appears in her dreams and advises her to wear forty layers of clothes for the wedding night, to parallel the forty layers of snakeskin the snake son has, and she is to take off one layer and ask the snake son to shed one skin. On the wedding night, the girl removes her layers of clothes and asks the prince to undress. After he removes the last skin, he becomes a handsome young man. Yilan Bey and the girl enjoy a happy marriage, while the stepmother dies of grief. According to Demir, the tale was collected in 2004, in Yeşilyurt district, Malatya, from an eighty-year-old informant E. Ciğerci, who learned the tale from her father.

==== Yılan Bey (Arguvan) ====
In a Turkish tale from Malatya with the title Yılan Bey ("Snake Lord"), a sultan has no children, and sends his wife to the doctors, with little success. One day, the queen is walking the garden in the company of concubines, and sees a snake with its offspring in a tree hollow. She sighs and prays to Yarabbi for a son, even if he is a snake. In time she becomes pregnant, but the midwives are being killed trying to help in the prince's delivery. A poor girl lives with her stepmother, who learns of the midwife problem and goes to the sultan to offer her stepdaughter as potential midwife, so that she dies as well. The sultan sends soldiers to bring the girl, and she asks to be allowed a visit to the cemetery first. The girl goes to her mother's grave to cry and sleeps. Her mother appears in a dream-vision and advises her not to be afraid, but ask the sultan for a large cauldron of milk, to be placed under the queen and the snake will come out of the queen's womb to smell the milk. The girl is brought to the palace, requests the cauldron and places the queen over it; a snake falls into the cauldron. The sultan rewards the girl with her weight in gold and sends her home. The stepmother dislikes that her stepdaughter survived, but mellows out once she sees the gold. Years later, the prince, called Yilan Bey, asks his father to be married. The sultan arranges a marriage to the most beautiful bride in the realm. However, on the wedding night, Yilan Bey kills his bride. Brides die in succession, until there are few girls in the country. The sultan then summons the girl who helped in the prince's delivery. The soldiers accompany the girl to the cemetery, where she goes to cry on her mother's grave again. Her mother's voice echoes from the grave and advises her to request forty layers of clothing for the wedding night, and she is to ask Yilan Bey to remove a layer of his own, as she removes one of hers, and he will turn into a handsome man strong as a lion. The girl goes to talk to the sultan and asks for the layers of apparel for her wedding night. She dons the forty layers and meets the snake prince, asking him to remove a layer of his skin, while she removes hers. After both undress forty layers of each one, the snake turns into a human youth, to the sultan's happiness. They celebrate a marriage of forty days and forty nights. Sometime later, the girl stepmother pays the new princess a visit, sees her washing her hands with a golden pitchers, and devises an idea to replace her stepdaughter for her own daughter. She spreads lies that the princess is sick, but the Sultan notices the deception in the words and orders the stepmother's execution by being tied to horses and torn to pieces. As for the girl, she lives in happiness with Yilan Bey. The tale was collected in 1988, in Eymir, Arguvan, Malatya Province, from a sixty-five-year-old female informant named Meryem Eren, who heard it from her mother.

==== Snake Child (Kayseri) ====
In a Turkish tale collected from an informant in Kayseri, with the title Yılan Çocuk ("Snake Child"), a husband and wife have no child. One day, they go on a journey, and the woman sees a snake playing with its young, so she sighs that she wants a son, even if he is a snake. Thus, one is born to them. The snake grows up, until one day the woman hides the growing son in a room and feeds it by throwing food to it. One day, the snake speaks and says he wants to bemarried. The snake's parents worry that no one would marry a snake. Then they think of a man named Bostancı, who has three daughters. The couple ask for the man's eldest daughter as the snake's bride, whom the snake kills after their 40 day and 40 night marriage. The couple send for the middle daughter, whom the snake also kills. Lastly, the youngest sister is asked to be the snake's bride. That night, the girl's mother appears to her in a dream and advises her to let the snake undress himself first all of his seven layers of skin, so she should burn all skins after. The girl goes to marry the snake son, and burns all of his snakeskins. His father enters the room and finds a youth instead of the snake, since he did not put on the snakeskin back, so he remains human forever. The following morning, they hold another wedding between their now human son and the girl.

==== Snake Son (Dodurgalar) ====
In a Turkish tale collected from an informant in Dodurgalar, Acıpayam, Tavas, Denizli Province, with the title Yılan Oğlan ("Snake Son"), the padishah's wife is ready to give birth, but the snake son bites and kills the midwife. A midwife lives with her stepdaughter and decides to send her in her place to preserve her own life and get rid of the girl. The girl goes to her mother's grave and her spirit advises her to cook a pot of milk, for her to place under the queen and close it when the snake son enters it. The girl does so and survives. Later, the snake prince is to be taught by a religious scholar, but he bites potential tutors. The padishah sends for the same girl that helped in the prince's delivery. The girl goes to her mother's grave and her spirit advises her daughter to take a rose bush and beat the snake whenever he tries to attack her. It happens thus, and the girl escapes once again. Lastly, the prince reaches marriageable age and wants to be married. The padishah suggests they bring the girl who taught him. The girl goes to her mother's grave and advises her to don a dress of hedgehog skin, and if he asks her to remove the dress, reply to have him remove his snakeskin first. The girl follows her mother's instructions, disenchants the prince, and marries him in human form. They have children.

==== Snake Son and Hedgehog Girl ====
In a Turkish tale collected from an informant in Hacila district, Kayseri, with the title Yılan Oğlan ile Kirpi Kız ("Snake Son and Hedgehog Girl"), a woman has no children. At one time, she sees a snake on the ground and sighs for Allah to give her a child that looks likea snake. Thus, a snake is born to her. He grows up and marries two girls in succession, and kills both of them. They find an orphan girl as the snake's third bride. The girl goes to her mother's grave and the mother's spirit advises her to wear hedgehog undergarments for the wedding night. On the wedding night, the snake asks the girl to remove the hedgehog garments, but the girl retorts for him to remove his snakeskin first. They remove their respective dresses. According to professor Necati Demir, the tale was collected from an 82-year-old illiterate informant, in 2008, who learned it from her mother.

==== Snake Son and The Orphan Girl ====
In a Turkish tale collected from an informant in the village of Büyük Tuzhisar, Bünyan, Kayseri province, with the title Yılan Oğlan ve Öksüz Kız ("Snake Son and The Orphan Girl"), a girl lives with her poor family in a village. One day, the girl's mother dies and her father remarries, but her stepmother is jealous of her stepdaughter and mistreats her, so the girl goes to her mother's grave for solace. In the same country, a padishah has a snake son who lives in a cauldron of milk. He drinks the whole cauldron and, when reaches marriageable age, the padishah arranges his marriage. However, the snake son kills his bride. Eventually, there are no more eligible brides in the sultanate, so he resorts to the villages. The stepmother learns of this and decides to send her stepdaughter to marry the snake prince and die. The girl runs to her mother's grave and cries herself to sleep. Her mother appears in her dreams and advises her to sew forty vests, and, when the prince asks her to undress, she is to ask him to undress. The girl wakes up and follows her mother's advice, asking the padishah to buy her yarn for forty vests. The girl sews the forty pieces of clothing, and marries the prince, while the stepmother hopes that the girl dies. The girl enters the wedding chambers and the snake comes out of the milk cauldron to attack the girl, but cannot. So he asks her to remove the layers of clothing, but she retorts to have him undress first. After he removes a layer, she removes one of hers also, until the snake son removes all his snakeskins and becomes a handsome man. He falls asleep, but the girl does not, so she tumbles the cauldron of milk. The padishah and his wife enter the prince's room and find their son in human form and the bride, still alive. They rejoice, and months later the human snake and his wife have a baby girl.

==== Black Snake (Ankara) ====
In a Turkish tale collected from an informant from Kuruçay, Çubuk, Ankara, with the title Kara Yılan ("Black Snake"), a padisha suffers for not having children to inherit the throne and confides in his vizier. The vizier bids them take a journey the following day, and stop to rest by a fountain. A bearded traveler greets them and, after hearing the padishah's plight, produces an apple, to be shared between the padishah and his queen. It happens thus, and nine months later, the queen is ready to give birth. However, the midwife goes to help in the delivery and sees that the prince is a snake, who attacks and kills her. Other midwives come to help in the delivery and die, until there are no more available, save for a woman in the remote part in the city. The woman sends her stepdaughter in her stead, and the girl goes to her mother's grave for solace. Her mother's voice comes from the grave and advises her to take a box filled with milk and trap the snake in if it tries to attack her. The girl helps in the delivery and traps the snake prince inside the milk box. Later, the snake grows up and reaches five years of age, then asks to attend school lessons. However, he kills the tutors they send him, and the viziers suggest they bring in the midwife. A eunuch goes to the woman's house to fetch the girl, who asks for a day. She goes to her mother's grave for advice, and the mother's spirit advises her to take forty-one sticks of rosewood with her, to beat him with forty sticks and command him to stop with the fortieth-first one. The girl does as instructed and teaches the black snake prince. When he reaches the age of twenty, he asks to be married, but he kills every bride with his poisonous fangs. The viziers suggest they bring in the girl who taught the prince. She goes to her mother's grave for advice, and her mother's voice tells her to don forty hedgehog skins as wedding dress, for the quills will protect her; then she is to ask him to remove his skin first, and finally she is to burn the snakeskin in a fire. The girl and the black snake prince are married by a judge, and she enters the wedding chambers in the hedgehog getup. The snake tries to attack her, but the quills rebuff him, so he asks her to remove her clothes. The girl replies that he should remove one first. The snake prince removes his snakeskin, which the girl immediately snatches from his hand and tosses in a fire to burn it. When she returns to the wedding chambers, she finds a handsome youth "like a lion". They live happily together.

==== Snake Son (Trabzon) ====
In a tale collected in Trabzon with the title Yılan Oğlan ("Snake Son"), a couple has no children in a certain land. The local ruler invites the citizens and separates them between couples with male children, with female children and those who have nont. Touched by this situation, the man prays for a child, even if he is a snake. Thus, nine months and ten days later, a snake is born to them. Time passes, the snake son grows and wants to get married. His parents bring brides for him to marry, but he bites them all to death. Despite his string of bride killings, the snake son's parents cannot dissuade him from wanting a bride, so they try to locate one able to marry him, and find an orphan girl from a distant land. The girl cries for her situation and fears for her life, but a dervish appears to her with comfort and advice: she is to ask for a huge load of logs, carried by 70 mules, and for her to wear seven sets of clothes for the wedding night; she is to light the fire and dons the seven layers of clothing, then retort the snake son that he should remove a layer of skin after he asks her to do so. The girl arranges for the logs and marries the snake son. On the wedding night, the snake son asks the girl to remove her layers, but she replies that he should remove a layer first. He removes the snakeskins, so the girl takes them all and burns them in the fire. In the following morning, the snake son's parents find the girl still alive and their son in human form. The girl and now human snake boy live in happiness.

==== The Youth in the Shape of a Snake ====
In a Turkish tale collected in Bingöl province with the title Yılan Kılığındaki Delikanlı ("The Youth in the Shape of a Snake"), a woman and her husband are childless, so she prays to God ("Rabbi"), for a son, even if he is a snake. Thus, one is born to her, while her husband is away working as a shepherd. The woman locks the snake son inside a room and feeds it through the doorway. Her husband returns and asks about their child, and the woman says they have a snake behind the door. The snake son grows up and reaches marriageable age. He then asks his parents to bring as a bride the daughter of the chieftain ("miresinin") of a nomad group that passes by their village, then return to their homeland. The snake's father goes to talk to the chieftain about marrying their children, and lies that his son studies in his room. The chieftain's daughter is given to the snake and, on the wedding night, she sees the snake and dies of fright. The snake son demands another bride, and threatens his parents to find him one. They find another girl who is given to him and dies of fright when the snake wraps around her body. After a long time, another nomad group enters the village, and the snake son demands yet another bride from the chieftain's daughter, and threatens his parents again. The snake's father goes to the second chieftain, spins a lie that his son is always studying, and arranges a third weddinh. However, this third bride is a peri, and asks her parents to bring her a dress made of hedgehog skins, otherwise she will not marry her bridegroom. She dons the hedgehog skin dress and goes to the wedding chambers. The snake tries to wrap himself around the girl, but the quills prickle him. He tries other times, failing, and asks the girl to remove her clothes. The girl replies for him to remove his first, and she will remove hers. The snake removes the snakeskin, becomes a handsome youth, and the girl also undresses, and both spend the night together. After three days, the snake's parents wonder if anything happened to the bride, and find a sleeping couple: his son in human form and a still alive bride. They take their clothes and burn them. The family hold another wedding for forty days and forty nights.

==== The Patient Girl ====
In a Turkish tale collected in Kirsehir from informant Emine Bülbül, with the title SABIRLI KIZ ("The Patient Girl"), a poor girl lives with her father and stepmother, who dislikes her stepdaughter. At the same time, a padishah has no children. One day, he and his queen walk in the garden, sight a snake, and the queen utter a prayer for God ("Yarabbi") to grant them a son, even if he is a snake. Thus, Allah gives them one. In labor, a midwife is sent to help in the delivery, but a snake bites her to death. Midwives are brought in succession and all are bitten by the snake, until there are no more, so the padishah issues an edict for someone to help in the delivery and be rewarded. The stepmother learns of this and lies that her stepdaughter can serve as the midwife. The girl asks for a moment to visit her mother's grave to recite a fatiha for her soul. She cries on her mother's grave, and a voice instructs her to ask for a golden basin, a golden bowl, both filled with milk, and a coat. The girl goes to the queen and bids the prince come, so the snake takes a bath in the milk and rests on the coat. The padishah rewards the girl, who is hated even more by her stepmother. Years later, the snake prince wishes to be taught, and the padishah sends teachers to teach him, but he bites them all to death. The monarch issues another edict looking for someone to teach the prince, and the stepmother offers her stepdaughter again. The girl goes to cry on her mother's grave, and her voice advises the girl to ask for a golden lectern and a stand, place the Quran on it, and utter the word "Bismillahirrahmanirrahim" for the prince to learn. It happens thus, and the girl teaches the prince, earning another reward from the reigning couple. Time passes again, and the prince asks to be married off. They marry the prince to the daughter to the right vizier, whom the snake bites to death. Next, they marry him to the daughter of the left vizier, who also dies. Brides in succession from the same city die by the snake prince's bite, so the padishah issues an edict for a suitable bride for the prince. The stepmother offers her stepdaughter to marry the snake prince, since she was his midwife and his teacher. The girl goes to her mother's grave and is advised to light a fire in a brazier, hide behind a door, grab the prince and toss him in the fire. On the wedding night, the girl takes the prince, tosses him in the fire and causes his snakeskin to burn, turning him into a handsome youth. The monarchs worry that their son's latest bride has been killed, but find her alive and next to a handsome youth, their son. The monarchs thank the girl for being their son's midwife and teacher and for reuniting them with their son.

==== The Sultan's Snake Son ====
In a Turkish tale collected in Yıldızeli from storyteller Atıfet Bildik, with the title Padişahın Yılan Oglu ("The Sultan's Snake Son"), a happy couple has an only daughter they dote on. The mother loves her daughter and promises her she will cook anything she wants and dress however she wants. The girl starts school, and her teacher also dotes on her. The teacher is in love with the pupil's daughter, and tries to convince her to kill her mother. The girl is afraid, since she loves both her mother and her teacher, but the teacher promises to be her new mother. One time, she teaches her how to kill the mother: she goes home and asks her mother to eat molasses, which she goes to pluck from a jar and the girl shoves her into the jar. The woman drowns and dies. Days later, the teacher bids the girl to match her with her father. The teacher marries the girl's father and begins to mistreat the girl, who regrets her actions. Meanwhile, the local sultan has a snake son who bites every teacher brought to teach him, until there are only a few left who hide out of fear. The monarch sends an emissary with a decree that anyone will be rewarded gold if they teach hsi son. No one comes forward, save for the girl's stepmother, who lies that she would be a good preceptor to the prince. The sultan's soldiers take the girl to the palace, while she says she cannot read and write. They pass by the girl's mother's grave and she asks to visit it. She cries over her mother's grave and asks for advice. Her mother teaches her what to do: she goes to the palace and asks for forty thorny sticks of cranberries. The snake enters the room to be taught and lunges at the girl, but she repels him by beating him with the stick, forcing him to sit down and read the lesson. After forty days, the snake is taught, and the girl earns the reward. Next, the snake prince wants to be married. However, whatever brides they bring him, he bites them all to death, until no family is willing to offer their daughters. The stepmother goes to talk to the sultan and offers the girl as the snake's bride. The soldiers escort the girl to the palace, but she wishes to pay a visit to her mother's grave. After another advice from her dead mother, the girl goes to the palace and asks for a large brazier. At night, the snake enters the room and asks the girl to undress and join him in bed. The girl says she will undress after he undresses; he removes the snakeskin which she throws in the brazier at once, destroying it. The prince, now in human form, questions why she did it. In the morning, they come to see if the girl is dead and find her alive and next to the prince. The sultan is happy his son is human and celebrates another marriage for them for forty days and forty nights.

==== Snake Prince (Ermenek) ====
In a Turkish tale from Ermenek titled YILAN PRENS ("Snake Prince"), a sultan is childless and dines with a guest, who offers his advice in how to conceive a child: the monarchs should bathe in a spring in a mountain on the edge of the kingdom on the day when spring turns to summer, and pray for the best. The sultan and his wife do so, and they retire to their quarters. The queen prays for a child of any sort, instead of praying to Allah. She becomes pregnant and is ready to give birth, but her son cannot be born. The king blames the midwives and kills them one by one. A local woman hears news of this, and offers her stepdaughter, daughter to her husband, as midwife to the prince to deliver the baby. The girl is brought to the palace and ordered to work as midwife. The girl realizes her life is at stake, and rushes to her mother's grave for counsel. An old person appears, explains that the queen did not ask for the best outcome, as she was instructed to do, and now there is a snake in her womb waiting to be born. The old person then advises the girl to ask for milk to be placed between the queen's legs, and the snake will leave the womb, drawn by the scent. It happens thus, and a black snake is born to both monarchs. In tears, the sultan and the queen concede that the snake is their son, and raise him in a backroom of the palace. Years later, the snake prince, who has come of age, asks to be married. The sultan arranges his son's marriage to the vizier's daughter, but the snake prince bites the bride to death. The same fate happens to the daughter of another vizier, and with a succession of brides that the sultan marries to his son. The same stepmother goes to the king and offers her daughter as a potential bride, hoping the girl is killed by the snake prince. The sultan sends a messenger to court the girl on the prince's behalf, and her father accepts. The girl runs to her mother's grave again for counsel, and the same old person appears to help her; he explains the prince is no snake, but a young man underneath it, and can be restored to human form: the girl is to ask for forty shirts to don on the wedding night, and she is to tell the snake prince to undress; after she and he remove their shirts, the prince will assume human form. The girl marries the prince and dons the forty shirts for their wedding night. The girl removes a shirt and the prince removes a skin, finally becoming a human youth after removing the final snakeskin. The girl marries the prince and they live happily.

=== Other tales ===
In a tale collected by Turkologist Ignác Kúnos from Adakale with the title "Ürem Bej" und eine Padischahstochter ("Ürem Bej and the Padishah's Daughter"), a padishah's daughter is tutored by a female teacher whom she likes very much. Due to this, the teacher says she can be the princess's new mother if the kills her mother by drowning her in the honey jug. It happens thus: the padishah's wife drowns in the honey, and he marries the female teacher. At first, the new stepmother is kind to the girl, but after some days, she begins to mistreat her and sends her to the kitchen to serve with the slaves and servants. The girl cries for her deed of killing her mother. Meanwhile, in another country, a padishah's wife is already in labour and ready to give birth, but her son has killed every midwife in the kingdom, which causes the padishah to search for one in another land. The second padishah comments about it to the first padishah, and his new wife convinces him to take her stepdaughter as the prince's midwife. The girl goes to her mother's grave to cry, and her mother's spirit, who holds no grudge over her death by her daughter's hands, advises her: wear gloves made of hedgehog skin and bring a bowl of warm milk; just as the prince is born, toss him into the bowl of milk. The girl follows her mother's ghost's instructions and delivers the prince: a legless, armless "Schlauch". The girl is rewarded with gold and silver and sent back. Later, the prince, who is named Ürem Bej, wants to be schooled, but he frightens every teaching candidate. The girl's stepmother suggests she becomes Ürem Bej's tutor, and again the girl cries on her mother's grave: her mother's ghost then advises her to put on an apron made of hedgehog skin and carry a rose twig, which she is to use to scold the prince and force him to read his lessons. It happens thus, and the girl survives. Later, Ürem Bej wants to get married, but his parents know that no one will want to marry one such as him. The girl's stepmother suggests her stepdaughter is to be his bride, since she was his midwife and tutor. The girl's mother's ghost advises to wear 40 kaftans made of hedgehog skin, which will prickle the prince if he tries to attack her, and she is to take off each kaftan as the prince takes each of his "veils". During the wedding night, the girl asks the prince to take off his veil one by one, just as she is taking off each of the kaftans. By doing so, the prince is transformed into a human youth. The prince and the girl then celebrate a wedding for forty days and forty nights.

=== Literary versions ===
Author Adnan Özyalçıner published a tale titled Yılan Şehzade ("Snake Prince"). In this tale, a king rules his kingdom with justice and fairness, but lacks an heir, which greatly imperils the realm. Many neighbouring sultans and kings offer their daughters as prospective brides to solve the issue, but he insists his wife will bear him a son. He prays to Allah for guidance, and his wife has a dream: a white-bearded man prepares some dough, which he molds into people and drops them in a silver basin. The king's wife questions the man, and he answers he prepares people to be born, which greatly interests the woman. The queen begs the man to give her a child, but he denies her request. As a last resort, the woman dips her fingers in the dough to catch some of it; the man sees her deed and curses her rashness by saying she will bear a snake for a son. The woman wakes up and tells her husband the dream. Astrologers and seers interpret it as good omen that a son will be born to the royal couple. Nine months later, the kingdom is abuzz with the birth of the prince, and the queen is in labour, but, when the midwife approaches her womb, the baby, a snake, attacks the woman with its forked tongue. News soon spread about the snake child in the queen's womb throughout the kingdom. Near the outskirts of the kingdom, a stepmother, who wants to get rid of her stepdaughter, goes to tell the king the girl can help in the prince's delivery. The girl is summoned to act as midwife, but tries to delay her task by request a sumptuous bed and accommodations. She also cries for her fate, and her mother appears to her in a dream with advice: take a bowl of warm milk to the queen's chambers. The girl does as her mother instructed and the snake prince, on smelling the milk, exits his mother's womb. The girl is handsomely rewarded with gold and gems, which her stepmother takes to build a larger house for herself. As time passes, the snake prince grows up and ends up killing everyone who approaches him, save his mother. Thus, it is decided to marry him off. Neighbouring sultans and monarchs send their daughters as prospective brides, thinking they will rule in the prince's stead, for he is but a snake, but the snake kills every bride they bring him. The stepmother then says her stepdaughter can be the snake prince's bride. Once again, the girl has a dream about her mother: the woman advises her to wear a heavy dress made with forty buttons of hedgehog skin on the wedding night. The girl does as instructed and enters the couple's room; the snake prince tries to attack and bite her, but the hedgehog skins prickle him. The girl then says she will take off one button as the prince removes a piece of his skin. They each undress themselves, until the snake prince removes the last layer of skin and becomes a black youth ("Kara yağız ... delikanlı", in the original). The girl and the black youth prince celebrate their union, as the stepmother, in defeat, hits her head in some stones and dies.

== See also ==
- The Bewitched Prince
- The Dragon-Prince and the Stepmother
- The Girl With Two Husbands (Greek fairy tale)
- Dragon-Child and Sun-Child (Armenian tale)
- Champavati (Indian tale)
- The Enchanted Snake (Italian tale)
- The King of the Snakes
- The Story of the Hamadryad
- The Origin of the Sirenia
